= 36th Combat Aviation Brigade =

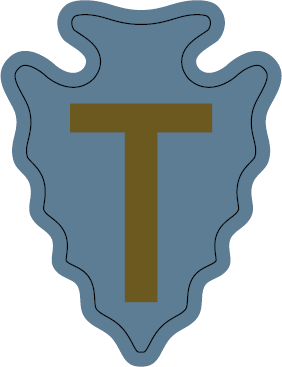
- 36th Combat Aviation Brigade insignia
- Country: United States
- Branch: United States Army
- Type: Aviation brigade
- Size: 2,700 soldiers
- Part of: 36th Infantry Division
- Garrison/HQ: Austin-Bergstrom Airport, Texas
- Engagements: Operation Iraqi Freedom 2006–2008

The 36th Combat Aviation Brigade is the Combat Aviation Brigade of the 36th Infantry Division, Texas Army National Guard. The 36th Combat Aviation Brigade completed a tour of duty in support of Operation Iraqi Freedom in the fall of 2007 when it was relieved by the 12th Combat Aviation Brigade. It deployed to Kuwait in April 2013 in support of Operation Enduring Freedom as part of Operation Spartan Shield, based at Camp Buehring.

== Organization ==
- 36th Combat Aviation Brigade, at Austin–Bergstrom Airport
  - Headquarters and Headquarters Company, 36th Combat Aviation Brigade, at Austin–Bergstrom Airport
  - Company C, 1st Battalion (Assault), 108th Aviation Regiment, at Austin–Bergstrom Airport (UH-60M Black Hawk)
    - Detachment 1, Headquarters and Headquarters Company, 1st Battalion (Assault), 108th Aviation Regiment, at Austin–Bergstrom Airport
    - Detachment 1, Company B, 1st Battalion (Assault), 108th Aviation Regiment, at Austin–Bergstrom Airport (UH-60M Black Hawk)
    - Detachment 1, Company D (AVUM), 1st Battalion (Assault), 108th Aviation Regiment, at Austin–Bergstrom Airport
    - Detachment 1, Company E (Forward Support), 1st Battalion (Assault), 108th Aviation Regiment, at Austin–Bergstrom Airport
  - Company B, 1st Battalion (Security & Support), 114th Aviation Regiment, at Austin–Bergstrom Airport (UH-72A Lakota)
  - Detachment 7, Company B, 2nd Battalion (Fixed Wing), 641st Aviation Regiment (Detachment 49, Operational Support Airlift Activity), at Austin–Bergstrom Airport (C-12 Huron)
  - 1st Battalion (Attack Reconnaissance), 149th Aviation Regiment, at Joint Base San Antonio - Lackland
    - Headquarters and Headquarters Company, 1st Battalion (Attack Reconnaissance), 149th Aviation Regiment, at Joint Base San Antonio - Lackland
      - Detachment 1, Headquarters and Headquarters Company, 1st Battalion (Attack Reconnaissance), 149th Aviation Regiment, at Tupelo Airport (MS) — (Mississippi Army National Guard)
    - Company A, 1st Battalion (Attack Reconnaissance), 149th Aviation Regiment, at Tupelo Airport (MS) (AH-64E Apache) — (Mississippi Army National Guard)
    - Company B, 1st Battalion (Attack Reconnaissance), 149th Aviation Regiment, at Joint Base San Antonio - Lackland (AH-64E Apache)
    - Company C, 1st Battalion (Attack Reconnaissance), 149th Aviation Regiment, at Joint Base San Antonio - Lackland (AH-64E Apache)
    - Company D (AVUM), 1st Battalion (Attack Reconnaissance), 149th Aviation Regiment, at Joint Base San Antonio - Lackland
      - Detachment 1, Company D (AVUM), 1st Battalion (Attack Reconnaissance), 149th Aviation Regiment, at Tupelo Airport (MS) — (Mississippi Army National Guard)
    - Company E (Forward Support), 1st Battalion (Attack Reconnaissance), 149th Aviation Regiment, at Joint Base San Antonio - Lackland
      - Detachment 1, Company E (Forward Support), 1st Battalion (Attack Reconnaissance), 149th Aviation Regiment, at Tupelo Airport (MS) — (Mississippi Army National Guard)
  - 2nd Battalion (General Support Aviation), 149th Aviation Regiment, at Grand Prairie Army Airfield
    - Headquarters and Headquarters Company, 2nd Battalion (General Support Aviation), 149th Aviation Regiment, at Grand Prairie Army Airfield
      - Detachment 1, Headquarters and Headquarters Company, 2nd Battalion (General Support Aviation), 149th Aviation Regiment, at Robinson Army Airfield (AR) — (Arkansas Army National Guard)
      - Detachment 2, Headquarters and Headquarters Company, 2nd Battalion (General Support Aviation), 149th Aviation Regiment, at Muldrow Army Heliport (OK) — (Oklahoma Army National Guard)
      - Detachment 3, Headquarters and Headquarters Company, 2nd Battalion (General Support Aviation), 149th Aviation Regiment, at Martindale Army Heliport
    - Company A (CAC), 2nd Battalion (General Support Aviation), 149th Aviation Regiment, at Robinson Army Airfield (AR) (UH-60L Black Hawk) — (Arkansas Army National Guard)
      - Detachment 1, Company A (CAC), 2nd Battalion (General Support Aviation), 149th Aviation Regiment, at Cheyenne Air National Guard Base (WY) — (Wyoming Army National Guard)
    - Company B (Heavy Lift), 2nd Battalion (General Support Aviation), 149th Aviation Regiment, at Grand Prairie Army Airfield (CH-47F Chinook)
      - Detachment 1, Company B (Heavy Lift), 2nd Battalion (General Support Aviation), 149th Aviation Regiment, at Muldrow Army Heliport (OK) — (Oklahoma Army National Guard)
    - Company C (MEDEVAC), 2nd Battalion (General Support Aviation), 149th Aviation Regiment, at Martindale Army Heliport (HH-60L Black Hawk)
      - Detachment 1, Company C (MEDEVAC), 2nd Battalion (General Support Aviation), 149th Aviation Regiment, at Silverbell Army Heliport (AZ) — (Arizona Army National Guard)
      - Detachment 2, Company C (MEDEVAC), 2nd Battalion (General Support Aviation), 149th Aviation Regiment, at Papago Army Heliport (AZ) — (Arizona Army National Guard)
    - Company D (AVUM), 2nd Battalion (General Support Aviation), 149th Aviation Regiment, at Grand Prairie Army Airfield
      - Detachment 1, Company D (AVUM), 2nd Battalion (General Support Aviation), 149th Aviation Regiment, at Robinson Army Airfield (AR) — (Arkansas Army National Guard)
      - Detachment 2, Company D (AVUM), 2nd Battalion (General Support Aviation), 149th Aviation Regiment, at Muldrow Army Heliport (OK) — (Oklahoma Army National Guard)
      - Detachment 3, Company D (AVUM), 2nd Battalion (General Support Aviation), 149th Aviation Regiment, at Martindale Army Heliport
      - Detachment 4, Company D (AVUM), 2nd Battalion (General Support Aviation), 149th Aviation Regiment, at Silverbell Army Heliport (AZ) — (Arizona Army National Guard)
      - Detachment 5, Company D (AVUM), 2nd Battalion (General Support Aviation), 149th Aviation Regiment, at Papago Army Heliport (AZ) — (Arizona Army National Guard)
      - Detachment 7, Company D (AVUM), 2nd Battalion (General Support Aviation), 149th Aviation Regiment, at Cheyenne Air National Guard Base (WY) — (Wyoming Army National Guard)
    - Company E (Forward Support), 2nd Battalion (General Support Aviation), 149th Aviation Regiment, at Grand Prairie Army Airfield
      - Detachment 1, Company E (Forward Support), 2nd Battalion (General Support Aviation), 149th Aviation Regiment, at Robinson Army Airfield (AR) — (Arkansas Army National Guard)
      - Detachment 2, Company E (Forward Support), 2nd Battalion (General Support Aviation), 149th Aviation Regiment, at Muldrow Army Heliport (OK) — (Oklahoma Army National Guard)
      - Detachment 3, Company E (Forward Support), 2nd Battalion (General Support Aviation), 149th Aviation Regiment, at Martindale Army Heliport
      - Detachment 4, Company E (Forward Support), 2nd Battalion (General Support Aviation), 149th Aviation Regiment, at Silverbell Army Heliport (AZ) — (Arizona Army National Guard)
      - Detachment 5, Company E (Forward Support), 2nd Battalion (General Support Aviation), 149th Aviation Regiment, at Papago Army Heliport (AZ) — (Arizona Army National Guard)
      - Detachment 7, Company E (Forward Support), 2nd Battalion (General Support Aviation), 149th Aviation Regiment, at Cheyenne Air National Guard Base (WY) — (Wyoming Army National Guard)
    - Company F (ATS), 2nd Battalion (General Support Aviation), 149th Aviation Regiment, at Martindale Army Heliport
  - 1st Battalion (Assault), 185th Aviation Regiment, at Tupelo Airport (MS) — (Mississippi Army National Guard)
  - 449th Aviation Support Battalion, at Martindale Army Heliport
    - Headquarters Support Company, 449th Aviation Support Battalion, at Martindale Army Heliport
    - Company A (Distribution), 449th Aviation Support Battalion, at Martindale Army Heliport
    - Company B (AVIM), 449th Aviation Support Battalion, at Austin–Bergstrom Airport
      - Detachment 1, Company B (AVIM), 449th Aviation Support Battalion, at Tupelo Airport (MS) — (Mississippi Army National Guard)
      - Detachment 2, Company B (AVIM), 449th Aviation Support Battalion, at Grand Prairie Army Airfield
      - Detachment 3, Company B (AVIM), 449th Aviation Support Battalion, at Joint Base San Antonio - Lackland
      - Detachment 4, Company B (AVIM), 449th Aviation Support Battalion, at South Valley Airport (UT) — (Utah Army National Guard)
    - Company C (Signal), 449th Aviation Support Battalion, at Austin–Bergstrom Airport

== History ==
The CAB, 36th Infantry Division was the first National Guard combat air brigade under the Army's reformatting plan.

Task Force Mustang has previously deployed to Bosnia and Kosovo, and to the United States Gulf Coast in support of disaster operations following Hurricanes Katrina and Rita.

=== Global War on Terror ===
During the brigade's deployment to Iraq it was composed of over 2700 soldiers from 44 states. Approximately 2500 were from 16 state Army Guard units. The brigade was augmented by over 200 Individual Ready Reserve Army soldiers from 36 different states.

Task Force Mustang shipped to Iraq in September 2006 in support of Operation Iraqi Freedom, following a few weeks of boots on the ground training at Camp Buehring, Kuwait in August. They completed five months of flight and theatre immersion training at Fort Hood, Texas and Fort Sill, Oklahoma and were certified "Fit to Fight" by Lt. Gen. Russel L. Honoré, commanding general, First U.S. Army, on 30 July 2006.

In the first eight months in Iraq, the CAB's units flew 51,000 combat flight hours while executing almost 7,300 combat missions. 36 CAB has carried more than 230,000 passengers, moved more than 15 million pounds of cargo, conducted almost 60 large combat air assaults, provided outstanding Medical evacuation (medevac) support to save many soldiers' lives, and supported ground troops with AH-64 Apaches.

==== Elements deployed to Iraq ====
- HHC Combat Aviation Brigade, 36th Infantry Division – Headquarters and Headquarters Company

homebase: Austin-Bergstrom International Airport, Austin, Texas.

- 1st Battalion, 149th Aviation Regiment (Attack)(Commander, MAJ(P) Stacy Rostorfer)

homebase: Ellington Field, Houston, Texas

- 2d Battalion, 135th Aviation Regiment – (Commander, LTC Christopher Petty, Command Sergeant Major, CSM Douglas Imfeld)

homebase: Buckley Air Force Base, Aurora, Colorado

- 1st Battalion, 131st Aviation Regiment

homebase: Montgomery, Alabama Army National Guard

- 1st Battalion, 108th Aviation Regiment

homebase: Topeka, Kansas
Unit became operational in Iraq on 1 November 2006 and was the last CAB unit to do so for the current Iraq deployment.

- 449th Support Battalion (Aviation) {Commander, LTC Travis (The Banker) Richards, Command Sergeant Major, CSM Monroe (John Wayne) Kelinske, HSC 449th ASB Commander, 1LT Michael McDonald, and 1SG Karl Thomas}, XO, MAJ Dave Cooper, S1, CPT Carry (Barbie Doll) Allen, S6, CPT Raymond (The Man) Simms, CSSAMO, MAJ Terry Biddle

homebase: San Antonio, Texas

- OSACOM Battalion (Operational Support Airlift Command) – a mix of units that came together in October 2006 and will wear the 36th Inf Div patch while serving in Iraq over the next year. OSACOM flies the C-23 Sherpa.
- C Co (Air Ambulance), 1st Battalion, 111th Aviation Regiment – Home stations are in Arkansas and Florida, unit attached to 2nd Battalion (General Support), 135th Aviation Regiment in 2006 as an additional MEDEVAC Company in support of OIF.

==== Army Guard unit personnel contributions ====
Arizona :1

- Texas: 1000
- Colorado: 325
- Alabama: 300
- Kansas: 225
- Arkansas: 150
- Missouri: 100
- Minnesota: 100
- Nebraska: 90
- Iowa: 50
- Ohio: 50
- Utah: 40
- Mississippi: 40
- California: 30
- Georgia: 25
- New York: 25
- South Carolina: 15
- Pennsylvania: 15
- Puerto Rico: 1
- Florida 70
- Illinois 1
- Vermont 3

All troop strength numbers are approximate.

The unit flew approximately 18 AH-64 Apache, 80 UH-60 Black Hawk, 12 CH-47 Chinook helicopters.
