= 185th Division =

185th Division may refer to:

- 185th Division (People's Republic of China)
- 185th Infantry Division (German Empire)
- 185th Infantry Division "Folgore", Italy
- 185th Rifle Division, Soviet Union

== See also ==
- List of military divisions by number
- 185th Brigade (disambiguation)
- 185th Regiment (disambiguation)
- 185th (disambiguation)
