= 185th Regiment =

185th Regiment may refer to:

- 185th Armor Regiment
- 185th Aviation Regiment (United States)
- 185th Fighter-Bomber Aviation Regiment
- 185th Infantry Regiment (United States)
- 185th Paratroopers Artillery Regiment "Folgore"
- 185th Paratroopers Reconnaissance Target Acquisition Regiment "Folgore"

== American Civil War regiments ==
- 185th New York Infantry Regiment
- 185th Ohio Infantry Regiment

== See also ==
- 185th Brigade (disambiguation)
- 185th (disambiguation)
