= Arkansas Army National Guard =

Coordinates: 34°48′54.8″N 92°17′18.9″W

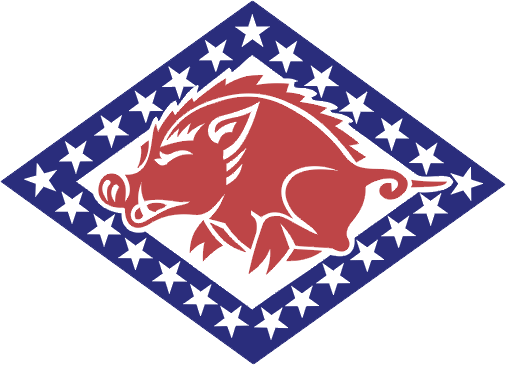
- Army National Guard Element, Joint Force Headquarters Arkansas Shoulder Sleeve Insignia
- Active: 1804–present
- Country: United States
- Allegiance: Arkansas
- Branch: United States Army National Guard
- Type: ARNG Headquarters Command
- Role: Organized militia Armed forces reserve
- Part of: Arkansas National Guard
- Headquarters: Camp Robinson MTC, North Little Rock, Arkansas
- Motto: "Arkansas First"

Commanders
- Commander in Chief: Governor Sarah Huckabee Sanders
- Adjutant General of Arkansas: Major General Jonathan M. Stubbs

Insignia
- Abbreviation: ARARNG
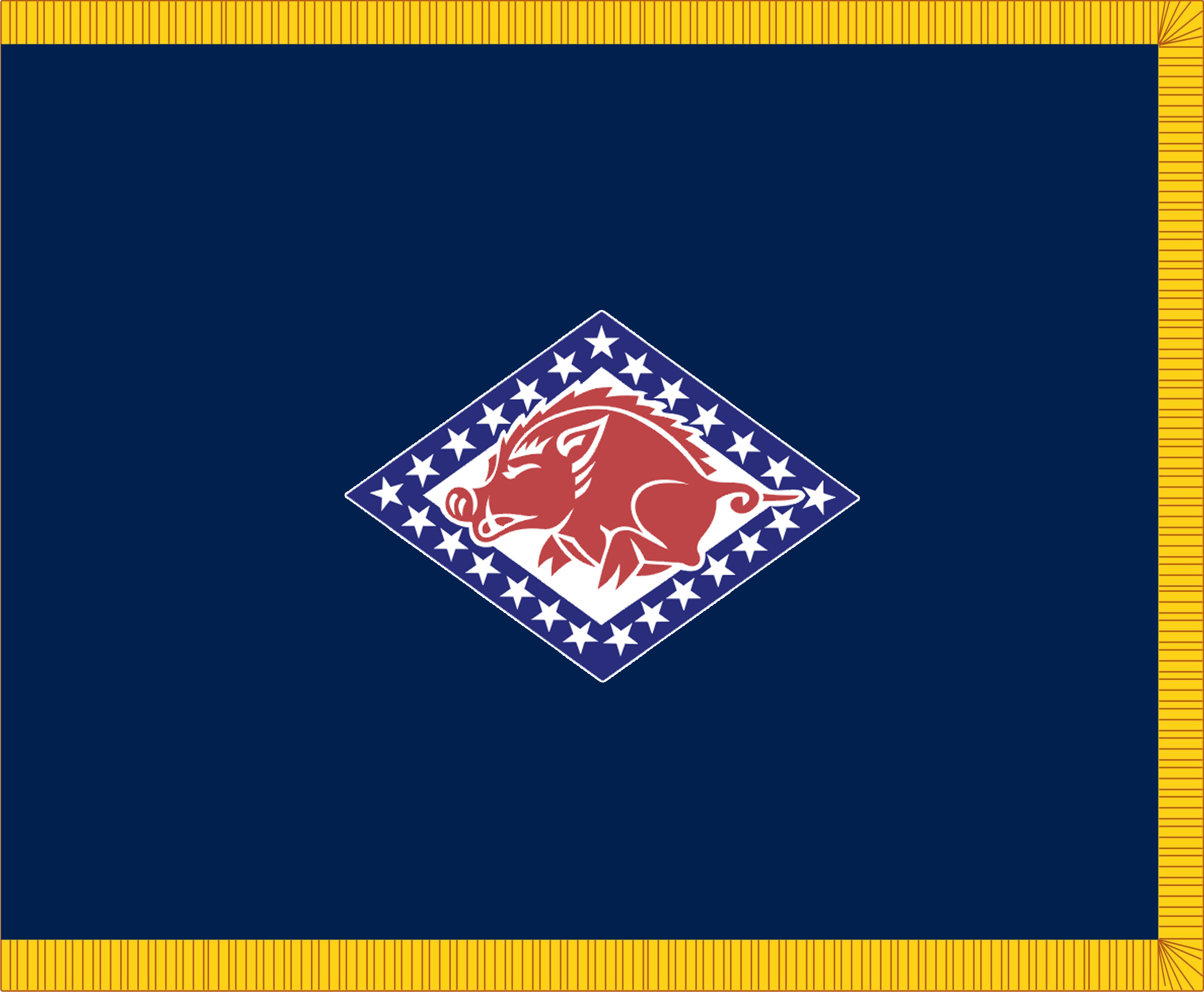
- Flag of the Arkansas Army National Guard Headquarters

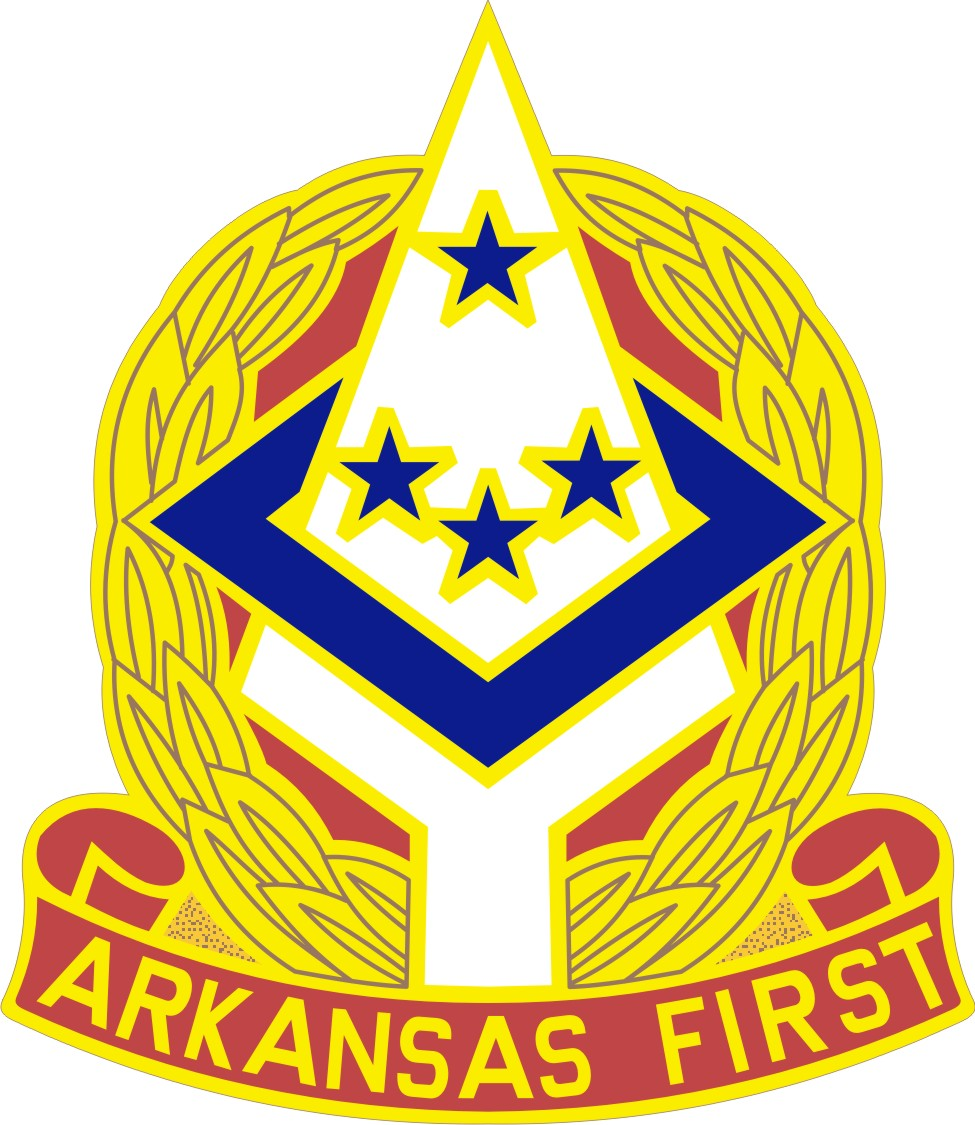
- Arkansas ARNG Headquarters DUI

- Arkansas Army National Guard Crest

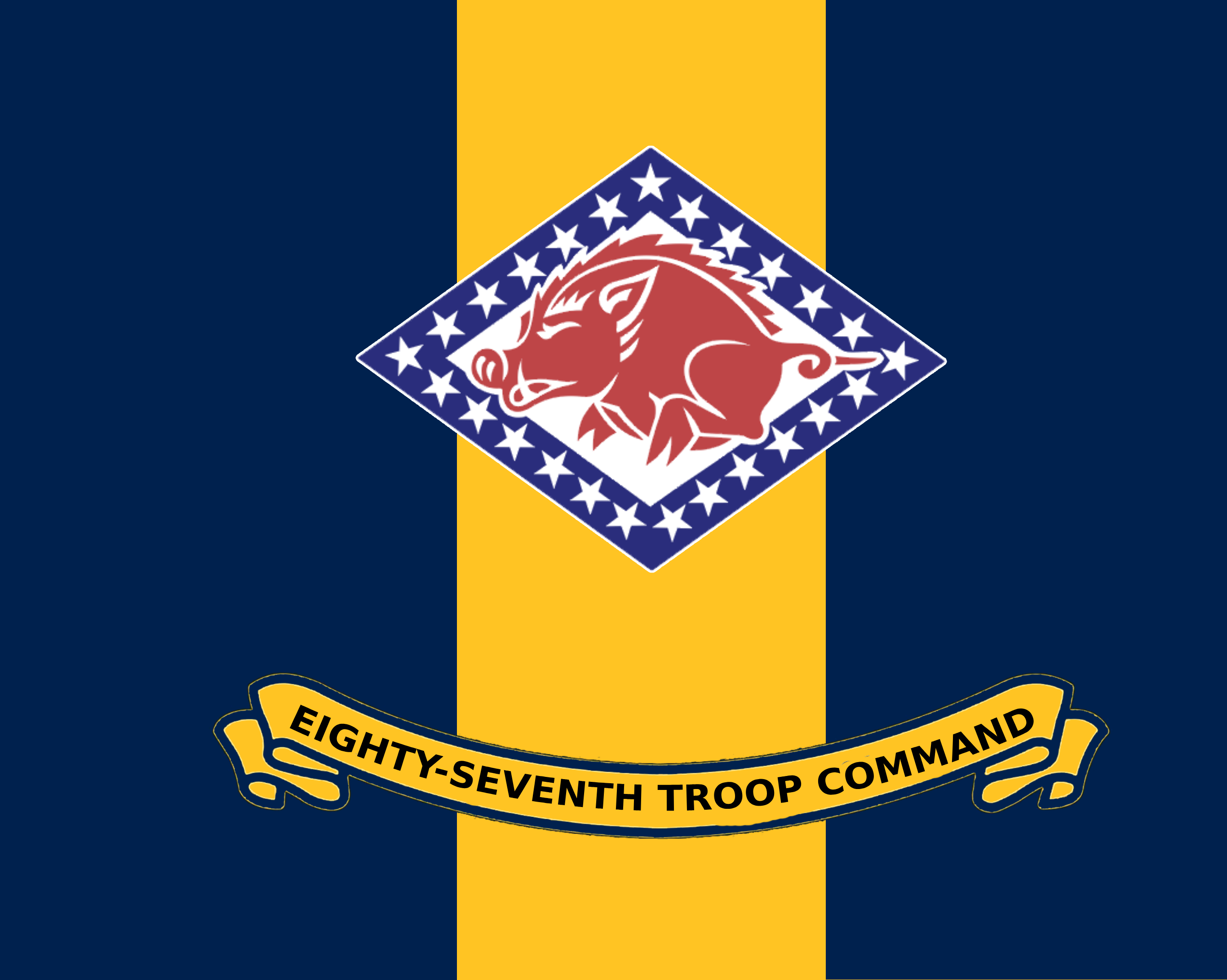
- Flag of the Arkansas Army National Guard 87th Troop Command

The Arkansas Army National Guard (ARARNG) is a component of the Arkansas National Guard and the United States National Guard. National coordination of various state National Guard units are maintained through the National Guard Bureau.

Arkansas Army National Guard units are trained and equipped as part of the United States Army. The same ranks and insignia are used and National Guardsmen are eligible to receive all United States military awards. The Arkansas National Guard also bestows a number of state awards for local services rendered in or to the State of Arkansas.

The Arkansas Army National Guard is composed of approximately 9,000 soldiers, and maintains 77 armories in 77 communities. The Arkansas Army National Guard also operates two major training facilities, Chaffee Maneuver Training Center (formerly Fort Chaffee), located near Fort Smith, Arkansas and Robinson Maneuver Training Center (formerly Camp Joseph T. Robinson) located in North Little Rock, Arkansas.

== Activation policies ==
National Guard units can be mobilized at any time by presidential order to supplement regular armed forces, and upon declaration of a state of emergency by the governor of the state in which they serve. Unlike Army Reserve members, National Guard members cannot be mobilized individually (except through voluntary transfers and Temporary DutY Assignments TDY), but only as part of their respective units.

=== Federal ===
For much of the final decades of the 20th century, National Guard personnel typically served "One weekend a month, two weeks a year", with a portion working for the Guard in a full-time capacity. The current forces formation plans of the US Army call for the typical National Guard unit (or National Guardsman) to serve one year of active duty for every six years of service. More specifically, current Department of Defense policy is that individual Guardsman will be given 24 months between deployments of no more than 12 months each.

=== State ===
When not activated for a Federal mission, the governor through the State Adjutant General commands Guard forces. The governor can call the Guard into action during local or statewide emergencies, such as storms, drought, and civil disturbances, to name a few.

== Organization ==
Arkansas Army National Guard units

As of February 2026 the Arkansas Army National Guard consists of the following units:

- Joint Force Headquarters-Arkansas, Army Element, at Camp Robinson
  - Headquarters and Headquarters Detachment, Joint Force Headquarters-Arkansas, Army Element, at Camp Robinson
  - Arkansas Medical Detachment, at Camp Robinson
  - 326th Judge Advocate General Trial Defense Team, at Camp Robinson
  - 475th Judge Advocate General Trial Defense Team, at Camp Robinson
  - Camp Robinson Maneuver Training Center, in North Little Rock
    - Installations Support Unit, at Camp Robinson
  - Fort Chaffee Maneuver Training Center, in Barling
    - Installations Support Unit, at Fort Chaffee
  - Army Aviation Support Facility #1, at Robinson Army Airfield
  - Combined Support Maintenance Shop #1, at Camp Robinson
  - Combined Support Maintenance Shop #2, at Fort Chaffee
  - Field Maintenance Shop #3, in Russellville
  - Field Maintenance Shop #4, in Malvern
  - Field Maintenance Shop #5, in Warren
  - Field Maintenance Shop #6, in Hazen
  - Field Maintenance Shop #7, at Camp Robinson
  - 39th Infantry Brigade Combat Team, at Camp Robinson (part of 35th Infantry Division)
    - Headquarters and Headquarters Company, 39th Infantry Brigade Combat Team, at Camp Robinson
    - 1st Squadron, 134th Cavalry Regiment, in Yutan (NE) — (Nebraska Army National Guard)
      - Headquarters and Headquarters Troop, 1st Squadron, 134th Cavalry Regiment, in Yutan (NE)
      - Troop A, 1st Squadron, 134th Cavalry Regiment, in Hastings (NE)
      - Troop B, 1st Squadron, 134th Cavalry Regiment, in York (NE)
      - Troop C (Dismounted), 1st Squadron, 134th Cavalry Regiment, in Beatrice (NE)
    - 1st Battalion, 138th Infantry Regiment, at Jefferson Barracks (MO) — (Missouri Army National Guard)
      - Headquarters and Headquarters Company, 1st Battalion, 138th Infantry Regiment, at Jefferson Barracks (MO)
      - Company A, 1st Battalion, 138th Infantry Regiment, in Mexico (MO)
      - Company B, 1st Battalion, 138th Infantry Regiment, in Bridgeton (MO)
      - Company C, 1st Battalion, 138th Infantry Regiment, in Perryville (MO)
      - Company D (Weapons), 1st Battalion, 138th Infantry Regiment, in Sikeston (MO)
    - 1st Battalion, 153rd Infantry Regiment, in Malvern
      - Headquarters and Headquarters Company, 1st Battalion, 153rd Infantry Regiment, in Malvern
        - Detachment 1, Headquarters and Headquarters Company, 1st Battalion, 153rd Infantry Regiment, in Arkadelphia
      - Company A, 1st Battalion, 153rd Infantry Regiment, in Camden
        - Detachment 1, Company A, 1st Battalion, 153rd Infantry Regiment, in Prescott
      - Company B, 1st Battalion, 153rd Infantry Regiment, in Texarkana
        - Detachment 1, Company B, 1st Battalion, 153rd Infantry Regiment, in Hope
      - Company C, 1st Battalion, 153rd Infantry Regiment, in Mena
        - Detachment 1, Company C, 1st Battalion, 153rd Infantry Regiment, in De Queen
      - Company D (Weapons), 1st Battalion, 153rd Infantry Regiment, in El Dorado
    - 2nd Battalion, 153rd Infantry Regiment, in Searcy
      - Headquarters and Headquarters Company, 2nd Battalion, 153rd Infantry Regiment, in Searcy
      - Company A, 2nd Battalion, 153rd Infantry Regiment, in Harrison
        - Detachment 1, Company A, 2nd Battalion, 153rd Infantry Regiment, in Walnut Ridge
      - Company B, 2nd Battalion, 153rd Infantry Regiment, in Batesville
        - Detachment 1, Company B, 2nd Battalion, 153rd Infantry Regiment, in Augusta
      - Company C, 2nd Battalion, 153rd Infantry Regiment, in West Memphis
        - Detachment 1, Company C, 2nd Battalion, 153rd Infantry Regiment, in Forrest City
      - Company D (Weapons), 2nd Battalion, 153rd Infantry Regiment, in Beebe
    - 1st Battalion, 206th Field Artillery Regiment, in Russellville
      - Headquarters and Headquarters Battery, 1st Battalion, 206th Field Artillery Regiment, in Russellville
        - Detachment 1, Headquarters and Headquarters Battery, 1st Battalion, 206th Field Artillery Regiment, in Paris
        - Detachment 2, Headquarters and Headquarters Battery, 1st Battalion, 206th Field Artillery Regiment, at Jefferson Barracks (MO) — (Missouri Army National Guard)
        - Detachment 3, Headquarters and Headquarters Battery, 1st Battalion, 206th Field Artillery Regiment, in Yutan (NE) — (Nebraska Army National Guard)
      - Battery A, 1st Battalion, 206th Field Artillery Regiment, in Dardanelle
        - Detachment 1, Battery A, 1st Battalion, 206th Field Artillery Regiment, in Morrilton
      - Battery B, 1st Battalion, 206th Field Artillery Regiment, in Rogers
      - Battery C, 1st Battalion, 206th Field Artillery Regiment, in Booneville
        - Detachment 1, Battery C, 1st Battalion, 206th Field Artillery Regiment, in Clarksville
    - 239th Brigade Engineer Battalion, in Conway
      - Headquarters and Headquarters Company, 239th Brigade Engineer Battalion, in Conway
      - Company A (Combat Engineer), 239th Brigade Engineer Battalion, at Camp Robinson
      - Company B (Combat Engineer), 239th Brigade Engineer Battalion, in Harrisburg
      - Company C (Signal), 239th Brigade Engineer Battalion, in White Hall
      - Company D (Military Intelligence), 239th Brigade Engineer Battalion, at Camp Robinson
        - Detachment 1, Company D (Military Intelligence), 239th Brigade Engineer Battalion, at Fort Chaffee (RQ-28A UAV)
    - 39th Brigade Support Battalion, in Hazen
      - Headquarters and Headquarters Company, 39th Brigade Support Battalion, in Hazen
      - Company A (Distribution), 39th Brigade Support Battalion, in White Hall
        - Detachment 1, Company A (Distribution), 39th Brigade Support Battalion, in Stuttgart
      - Company B (Maintenance), 39th Brigade Support Battalion, in Heber Springs
      - Company C (Medical), 39th Brigade Support Battalion, in Lonoke
      - Company D (Forward Support), 39th Brigade Support Battalion, in Yutan (NE) — attached to 1st Squadron, 18th Cavalry Regiment (Nebraska Army National Guard)
      - Company E (Forward Support), 39th Brigade Support Battalion, in Benton — attached to 239th Brigade Engineer Battalion
      - Company F (Forward Support), 39th Brigade Support Battalion, in Rogers — attached to 1st Battalion, 206th Field Artillery Regiment
      - Company G (Forward Support), 39th Brigade Support Battalion, in Warren — attached to 1st Battalion, 153rd Infantry Regiment
      - Company H (Forward Support), 39th Brigade Support Battalion, in Cabot — attached to 2nd Battalion, 153rd Infantry Regiment
      - Company I (Forward Support), 39th Brigade Support Battalion, in Poplar Bluff (MO) — attached to 1st Battalion, 138th Infantry Regiment (Missouri Army National Guard)
  - 77th Combat Aviation Brigade, at Robinson Army Airfield
    - Headquarters Support Company, 77th Combat Aviation Brigade, at Robinson Army Airfield
    - 1st Battalion (Security & Support), 114th Aviation Regiment, at Robinson Army Airfield
      - Headquarters and Headquarters Company, 1st Battalion (Security & Support), 114th Aviation Regiment, at Robinson Army Airfield
      - Company A, 1st Battalion (Security & Support), 114th Aviation Regiment, at Robinson Army Airfield (UH-72A Lakota)
      - Company B, 1st Battalion (Security & Support), 114th Aviation Regiment, at Austin–Bergstrom Airport (TX) (UH-72A Lakota) — (Texas Army National Guard)
        - Detachment 1, Company B, 1st Battalion (Security & Support), 114th Aviation Regiment, at Isla Grande Airport (PR) — (Puerto Rico Army National Guard)
      - Company C, 1st Battalion (Security & Support), 114th Aviation Regiment, at Tupelo Airport (MS) (UH-72A Lakota) — (Mississippi Army National Guard)
        - Detachment 1, Company C, 1st Battalion (Security & Support), 114th Aviation Regiment, at Esler Airfield (LA) — (Louisiana Army National Guard)
      - Company D (MEDEVAC), 1st Battalion (Security & Support), 114th Aviation Regiment, at Isla Grande Airport (PR) (UH-72A Lakota) — (Puerto Rico Army National Guard)
        - Detachment 1, Company D (MEDEVAC), 1st Battalion (Security & Support), 114th Aviation Regiment, at Henry E. Rohlsen Airport (VI) — (Virgin Islands Army National Guard)
        - Detachment 2, Company D (MEDEVAC), 1st Battalion (Security & Support), 114th Aviation Regiment, at Robinson Army Airfield
      - Company A (CAC), 2nd Battalion (General Support Aviation), 149th Aviation Regiment, at Robinson Army Airfield (UH-60L Black Hawk)
        - Detachment 1, Headquarters and Headquarters Company, 2nd Battalion (General Support Aviation), 149th Aviation Regiment, at Robinson Army Airfield
        - Detachment 1, Company D (AVUM), 2nd Battalion (General Support Aviation), 149th Aviation Regiment, at Robinson Army Airfield
        - Detachment 1, Company E (Forward Support), 2nd Battalion (General Support Aviation), 149th Aviation Regiment, at Robinson Army Airfield
      - Company C, 1st Battalion (Assault), 185th Aviation Regiment, at Robinson Army Airfield (UH-60M Black Hawk)
        - Detachment 2, Headquarters and Headquarters Company, 1st Battalion (Assault), 185th Aviation Regiment, at Robinson Army Airfield
      - Company F (ATS), 2nd Battalion (General Support Aviation), 211th Aviation Regiment, at Robinson Army Airfield
      - Detachment 2, Company A, 2nd Battalion (Fixed Wing), 245th Aviation Regiment (Detachment 31, Operational Support Airlift Activity), at Robinson Army Airfield (C-26E Metroliner)
    - 3rd Battalion (General Support Aviation), 238th Aviation Regiment, at Abrams Airport (MI) — (Michigan Army National Guard)
      - Detachment 1, Company G (MEDEVAC), 3rd Battalion (General Support Aviation), 238th Aviation Regiment, at Robinson Army Airfield (HH-60L Black Hawk)
        - Detachment 5, Company D (AVUM), 3rd Battalion (General Support Aviation), 238th Aviation Regiment, at Robinson Army Airfield
        - Detachment 6, Company E (Forward Support), 3rd Battalion (General Support Aviation), 238th Aviation Regiment, at Robinson Army Airfield
    - 1st Battalion (Assault), 147th Aviation Regiment, at Truax Field (WI) — (Wisconsin Army National Guard)
    - 2nd Battalion (Assault), 285th Aviation Regiment, at Papago Army Heliport (AZ) — (Arizona Army National Guard)
    - 777th Aviation Support Battalion, at Robinson Army Airfield
      - Headquarters Support Company, 777th Aviation Support Battalion, at Robinson Army Airfield
      - Company A (Distribution), 777th Aviation Support Battalion, in Okmulgee (OK) — (Oklahoma Army National Guard)
      - Company B (AVIM), 777th Aviation Support Battalion, at Wheeler Army Airfield (HI) — (Hawaii Army National Guard)
        - Detachment 1, Company B (AVIM), 777th Aviation Support Battalion, at Isla Grande Airport (PR) — (Puerto Rico Army National Guard)
        - Detachment 2, Company B (AVIM), 777th Aviation Support Battalion, at Robinson Army Airfield
        - Detachment 3, Company B (AVIM), 777th Aviation Support Battalion, at Bryant Army Heliport (AK) — (Alaska Army National Guard)
      - Company C (Signal), 777th Aviation Support Battalion, at Robinson Army Airfield
  - 87th Troop Command, at Camp Robinson
    - Headquarters and Headquarters Company, 87th Troop Command, at Camp Robinson
    - 61st Civil Support Team (WMD), at Camp Robinson
    - 871st Troop Command, in Hot Springs
      - Headquarters and Headquarters Company, 871st Troop Command, in Hot Springs
      - 106th Army Band, at Camp Robinson
      - 119th Mobile Public Affairs Detachment, at Camp Robinson
      - 216th Military Police Company (Detention), at Camp Robinson
        - Detachment 1, 216th Military Police Company (Detention), in Sheridan
      - 224th Ordnance Company (Support Maintenance), in Mountain Home
        - Detachment 1, 224th Ordnance Company (Support Maintenance), in Marshall
    - 875th Engineer Battalion, in Jonesboro
      - Headquarters and Headquarters Company, 875th Engineer Battalion, in Jonesboro
      - Forward Support Company, 875th Engineer Battalion, in Jonesboro
      - 1036th Engineer Company (Sapper), in Jonesboro
      - 1037th Engineer Company (Mobility Augmentation Company), in Paragould
    - Arkansas Recruiting & Retention Battalion, at Camp Robinson
      - Company A, Arkansas Recruiting & Retention Battalion, at Camp Robinson
      - Company B, Arkansas Recruiting & Retention Battalion, at Camp Robinson
  - 142nd Field Artillery Brigade, in Fayetteville
    - Headquarters and Headquarters Battery, 142nd Field Artillery Brigade, in Fayetteville
    - 1st Battalion, 117th Field Artillery Regiment, in Andalusia (AL) (M777A2) — (Alabama Army National Guard)
    - 1st Battalion, 142nd Field Artillery Regiment, in Bentonville (M270A2 MLRS)
      - Headquarters and Headquarters Battery, 1st Battalion, 142nd Field Artillery Regiment, in Bentonville
      - Battery A, 1st Battalion, 142nd Field Artillery Regiment, in Bentonville
      - Battery B, 1st Battalion, 142nd Field Artillery Regiment, in Bentonville
      - 936th Forward Support Company, in Bentonville
    - 2nd Battalion, 142nd Field Artillery Regiment, at Fort Chaffee (M109A6 Paladin)
      - Headquarters and Headquarters Battery, 2nd Battalion, 142nd Field Artillery Regiment, at Fort Chaffee
      - Battery A, 2nd Battalion, 142nd Field Artillery Regiment, at Fort Chaffee
      - Battery B, 2nd Battalion, 142nd Field Artillery Regiment, in Siloam Springs
      - Battery C, 2nd Battalion, 142nd Field Artillery Regiment, in Ozark
      - 937th Forward Support Company, at Fort Chaffee
    - 1st Battalion, 181st Field Artillery Regiment, in Chattanooga (TN) (M142 HIMARS) — (Tennessee Army National Guard)
    - 217th Brigade Support Battalion, in Lincoln
      - Headquarters Support Battery, 217th Brigade Support Battalion, in Lincoln
      - 142nd Signal Company, Fayetteville
  - 233rd Regiment, Regional Training Institute, at Camp Robinson
    - National Guard Marksmanship Training Center, at Camp Robinson

Aviation unit abbreviations: CAC — Command Aviation Company; MEDEVAC — Medical evacuation; AVUM — Aviation Unit Maintenance; AVIM — Aviation Intermediate Maintenance; ATS — Air Traffic Service

== History ==
The Arkansas National Guard traces its roots to the creation of the Territorial Militia in 1804. Interest in the Militia in Arkansas generally waxed and waned throughout the 19th century as various national emergencies arose and passed. Organizations existed at the county and city level, but regimental designations above the company level did not become stable until the closing years of the 19th century. During much of this time local militia companies were supported by private funds. Arkansas provided troops for the War with Mexico, the American Civil War, and the Spanish–American War during the 19th century. In each case, in answer to the governor's call, local militia companies would turn out and be formed into regiments or battalions for induction into federal service. The militia was also heavily engaged in the violence that characterized the Reconstruction period following the Civil War.

Following the Spanish–American War, the Federal Government slowly began to provide increasing funding and direction to the state militias with the organization formally changing its name from the Arkansas State Guard to the Arkansas National Guard following the passage of the National Defense act of 1903. Arkansas National Guard troops participated in the Mexican Expedition in 1916–1917 and returned home briefly before being mobilized again for World War I. When the Arkansas National Guard units were mustered into Federal Service for World War I, their state designations were removed and they were renumbered in accordance with a national System. These new Regimental numbers are still represented today in the Arkansas Army National Guard by the 153rd Infantry Regiment, formerly the 1st Arkansas Infantry, and the 142nd Field Artillery Regiment, formerly the 2nd Arkansas Infantry.

The Arkansas National Guard experience a massive expansion between World War I and World War II, with the first permanent armories being built and troops now directed to drill four times per month and to participate in a two-week encampment in the summers. Arkansas provided many units for World War II. The 142nd Field Artillery, now redesignated as the 936 and 937th Field Artillery Battalions participated in the European Campaigns, while the 206th Coast Artillery and the 153rd Infantry served in the Aleutian Islands.

In 1947, as a result of the creation of the United States Air Force as a separate branch from the United States Army, the Arkansas National Guard was split into the Arkansas Army National Guard and the Arkansas Air National Guard. Both organizations work for the Adjutant General of Arkansas. The Adjutant General may be either a member of the Air National Guard or the Army National Guard.

The 936th and 937th Field Artillery Battalions, along with several other Arkansas Army and Air National Guard units were mobilized again for service in the Korean War. Throughout the Cold War Arkansas National Guard units underwent multiple re-organizations in response to the nation's Cold War strategy. No Arkansas National Guard Troops participated in the Vietnam War, but the state was called upon again to support Operation Desert Shield/Desert Storm.

The years following the first Persian Gulf War saw a dramatic increase in the use of National Guard units for service overseas to support various peace-keeping operations. During the 1980s Arkansas Nation Guard units made multiple training rotations to Honduras during a period of increased Marxist activity. In the 1990s, Arkansas National Guard troops began participating in peace-keeping operations in Bosnia and assisted in the enforcement of a no-fly zone in Iraq by participating in Operation Southern Watch.

Following the terrorist attacks of 11 September 2001, the National Guard transitioned from the nation's strategic reserve to a part of the operational force. In the immediate crisis following the attacks, National Guard troops were deployed to provide security at airports, nuclear plants, and other critical infrastructure in the state and around the nation, as part of Operation Noble Eagle. Arkansas troops participated in operations to support peace-keeping operations in the Sinai and Kosovo to free up regular Army troops for combat, but the state has also contributed multiple troops for the Global War on Terrorism. Every major unit in the Arkansas National Guard has now deployed at least once in support of Operation Iraqi Freedom and the state's 39th Infantry Brigade Combat Team became the first National Guard brigade to deploy to Iraq for a second time when it deployed in 2008.

Throughout its service during times of war, the Arkansas National Guard has continued to perform its role of providing service to the citizens of the state during times of disaster. The Guard has responded to numerous tornadoes, floods and fires, in addition to being called upon to provide security and quell violence in times of civil disturbance. The Guard has also provided support to neighboring states, most notably Louisiana during Hurricanes Katrina, Rita and Ike.

== Arkansas National Guard members killed in action ==
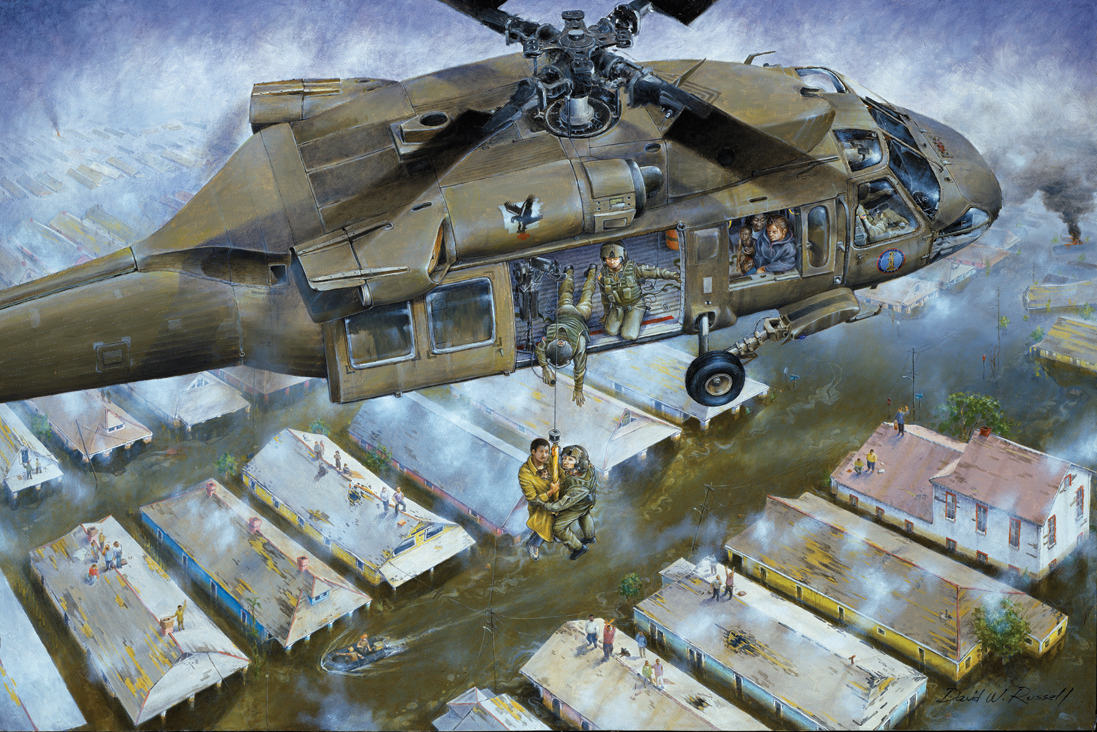
Painting showing an Arkansas ARNG helicopter rescuing people in the flooded Lower Ninth Ward of New Orleans in 2005

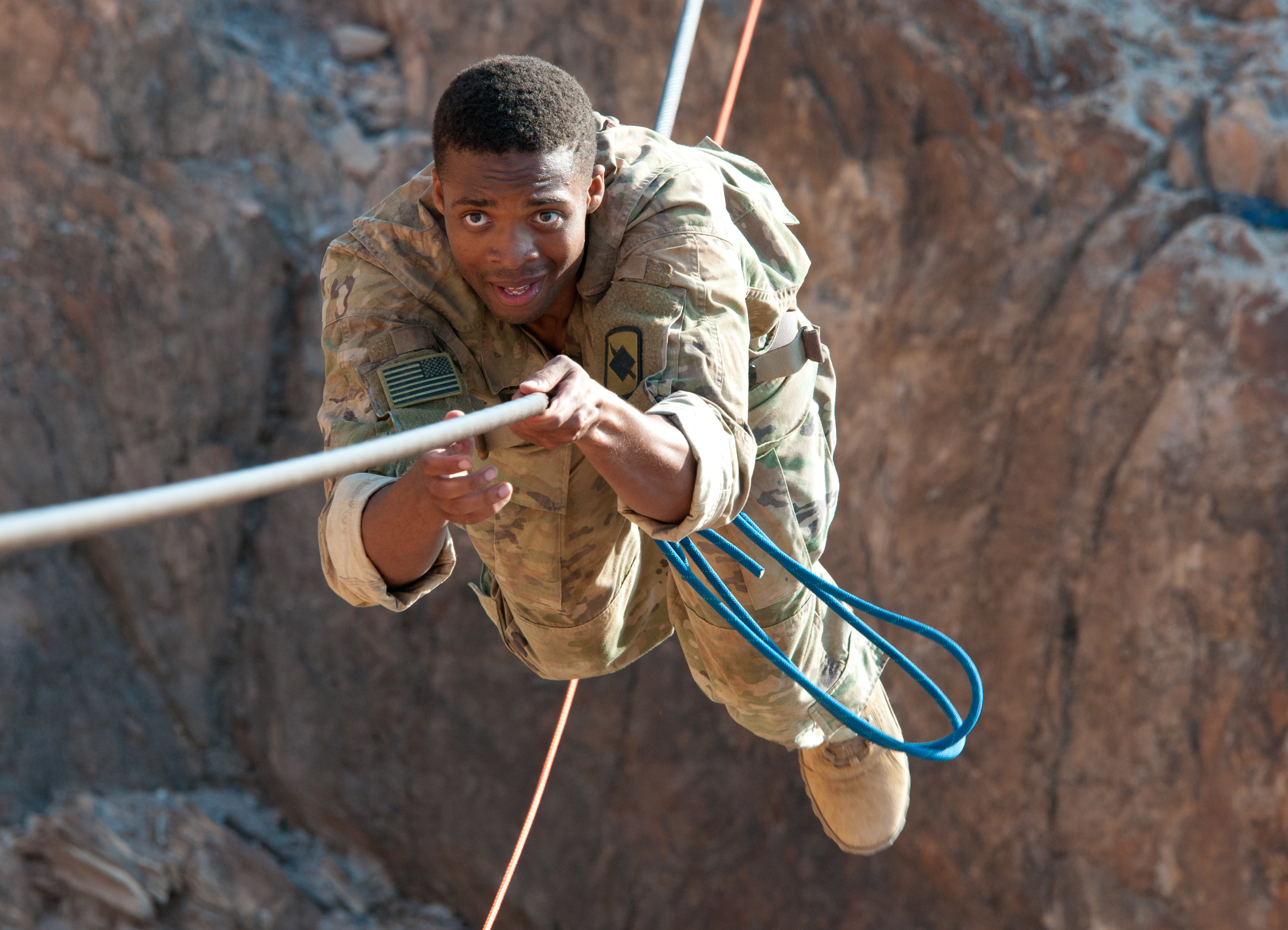
2nd Lt. Kre McMahon, of the Arkansas National Guard, completes the mountain obstacle portion of the French Desert Commando Course in Djibouti, Africa

=== War with Mexico ===
- Colonel Archibald Yell
- Corporal Darian Steward
- Corporal Pleasant Williams
- Corporal Richard Saunders
- Corporal Wilson Tomberlin
- Captain Andrew Porter
- Private Andrew Teague
- Private Clairborne Taylor
- Private David Hogan
- Private Franklin Brown
- Private George Martin
- Private Green Higgins
- Private Harman Winn
- Private Harrison Penter
- Private Jacob Ray
- Private John Milliner
- Private John Pelham, Jr.
- Private Thomas Rowland
- Private William Phipps
- Private William Robinson

==== 206th Coast Artillery Regiment ====
- Private Claude H. Biggs, Battery F, Killed in Action, Dutch Harbor, Alaska, 3 June 1942
- Private Allen C. Collier, Jr., HQ Battery, 2nd Battalion, Dutch Harbor, Alaska, Killed in Action, 3 June 1942
- Private James E. Harrington, Battery E, Killed in Action, Dutch Harbor, Alaska, 3 June 1942
- Private Hugh Bryan Timberlake, Battery B, Killed in Action, Dutch Harbor, Alaska, 3 June 1942
- Private James R. Wiles, Battery C, Killed in Action, Dutch Harbor, Alaska, 3 June 1942
- Private Charles W. Hill, Battery F, Killed in Action, Dutch Harbor, Alaska, 4 June 1942
- Private Ambrose D. Regalia, Battery F, Killed in Action, Dutch Harbor, Alaska, 4 June 1942

==== Killed in action listed on the Battery C, 206th CA monument in Jonesboro, Arkansas ====
This monument includes the names of several former 206th Coast Artillery members who were Killed in Action with other units after the breakup of the 206th Coast Artillery Regiment in 1944.

- Kenneth Burkhart
- Clifford Cloud
- Joseph J. Eble
- John H. Franklin
- Charles Hutton
- Cletis Jeffers
- Fred Johnson
- James Lemmer
- Owen "H" Lynch
- Carl Neal
- Ray Shreeve
- Frank Sweeney
- Roy Wiles (probably the same as Pvt. James R. Wiles listed as KIA from Dutch Harbor)

=== Korea ===
- Corporal Donald Osbourn
- Captain Paul Blew
- Private First Class Fred Rose, Jr.
- Private First Class Jarrell Graham

=== Operation Iraqi Freedom 2004 ===
- Sergeant First Class William W. Labadie Jr. of Bauxite, Age 45. Killed in Action, 7 April 2004
- Captain Arthur L. Felder of Lewisville, Age 36. Killed in Action, 24 April 2004
- Chief Warrant Officer Patrick W. Kordsmeier of North Little Rock, Age 49. Killed in Action, 24 April 2004
- Staff Sergeant Billy J. Orton of Carlisle, Age 41. Killed in Action, 24 April 2004
- Staff Sergeant Stacey C. Brandon of Hazen, Age 35. Killed in Action, 24 April 2004
- Specialist Kenneth Melton of Batesville, Age 30. Killed in Action, 25 April 2004
- Staff Sergeant Hesley Box of Nashville, Age 24. Killed in Action, 6 May 2004
- Sergeant First Class Troy Leon Miranda of Wickes, Age 44. Killed in Action, 20 May 2004
- Sergeant Russell L. Collier of Harrison, Age 48. Killed in Action, 3 October 2004
- Sergeant Ronald Wayne Baker of Cabot, Age 34. Killed in Action, 13 October 2004
- Sergeant Michael A. Smith of Camden, Age 24. Died of Wounds, 26 November 2004

=== Operation Iraqi Freedom 2005 ===
- Specialist Jimmy D. Buie of Floral, Age 44. Killed in Action, 4 January 2005
- Specialist Joshua S. Marcum of Evening Shade, Age 33. Killed in Action, 4 January 2005
- Specialist Jeremy W. McHalffey of Mabelvale, Age 28. Killed in Action, 4 January 2005
- Staff Sergeant William T. Robbins of, Beebe, AR, HHC, 39th Infantry Brigade Combat Team, Died at Camp Taji, Iraq, on 10 February 2005, of non-combat related injuries.

=== Operation Iraqi Freedom 2006 ===
- Specialist Derek James Plowman of Everton, AR, Battery C, 1st Battalion, 142nd Fires Brigade.

Died of non-combat related injuries on 20 July 2006 in Baghdad, Iraq.

=== Operation Iraqi Freedom 2007 ===
- Sergeant John R. Massey, 29, of Searcy, Ark., C Battery, 142 Fires Brigade, Ozark Ark.
- Sergeant Erich Scott Smallwood, 23, of Truman, Ark., A Company, 875th Engineer Battalion, KIA 26 MAY 2007, Balad, Iraq.

=== Operation Iraqi Freedom 2008 ===
- Sergeant First Class Anthony Lynn Woodham, Age 37, of Rogers, Ark., Heber Springs, Ark., died 5 July, at Camp Adder, Tallil, Iraq, from non-combat related injuries.
- Specialist James M. Clay, Age 25, of Mountain Home, Ark.; Little Rock, Ark.; died 13 November 2008 in Anbar province, Iraq, of injuries sustained in a vehicle accident.

== See also ==
- Arkansas State Guard
- List of armored and cavalry regiments of the United States Army
