= 77th Combat Aviation Brigade =

- 77th Combat Aviation Brigade shoulder sleeve insignia
- Active: 2008 – present
- Country: United States
- Branch: United States Army National Guard
- Type: Aviation
- Size: Brigade
- Part of: Arkansas Army National Guard
- Garrison/HQ: MG Charles H. Wilson Army Aviation Support Facility, Robinson Maneuver Training Center
- Engagements: Global war on terrorism; Operation Iraqi Freedom; Operation Inherent Resolve; Operation Spartan Shield

Commanders
- Current commander: COL Shawn Keeter

Insignia
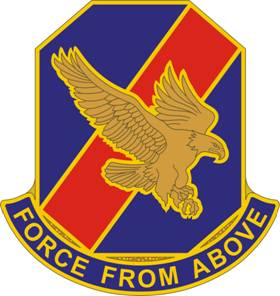
- Distinctive unit insignia

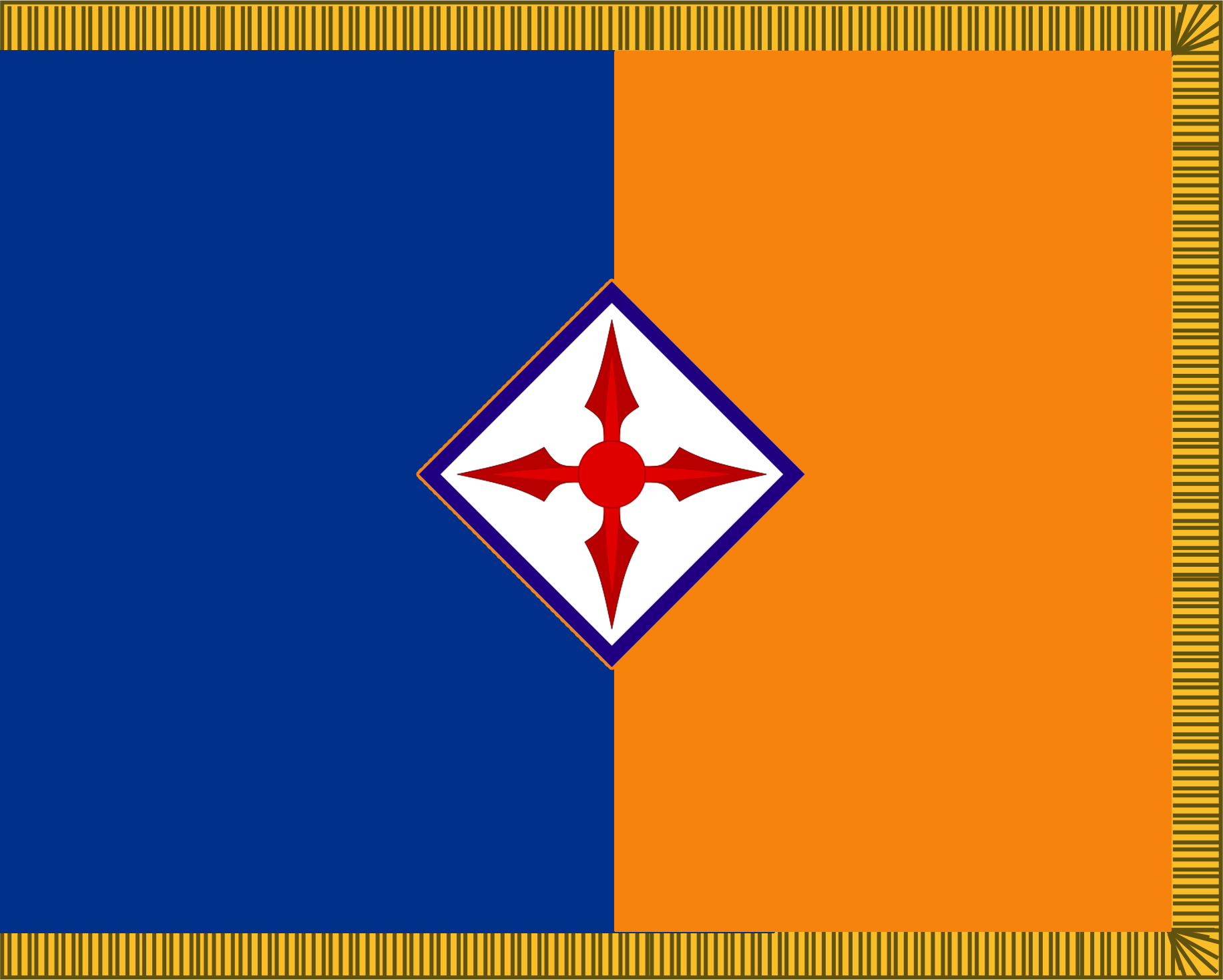
- 77th Aviation Brigade Flag

Aircraft flown
- Multirole helicopter: UH-60 Black Hawk; UH-72 Lakota
- Transport: C-26 Metroliner

The 77th Combat Aviation Brigade, also known as the 77th Expeditionary Combat Aviation Brigade (ECAB), is an aviation brigade of the United States Army in the Arkansas Army National Guard. When federalized and mobilized for active service, the 77th Combat Aviation Brigade comes under the command and control of an Aviation Command.

On 20 or 21 August, the Arkansas Army National Guard received an order to mobilize, calling for 150 soldiers from the 77th Aviation Brigade to federal active duty in support of Operation Iraqi Freedom.

Sometime around June 2016, Detachment 2, Company B, 1st Battalion, 111th Aviation Regiment were deployed alongside 2nd Battalion, 224th Aviation Regiment in support of Operation Inherent Resolve, with the former lying 3,300 flight hours and sortieing more than 275 mission requests.The former was also deployed in support of Operation Spartan Shield, operating mostly out of Camp Buehring, Kuwait. The detachment were responsible for the maintenance of 67 rotary wing aircraft and 24 unmanned aircraft.

== Organization ==
- 77th Combat Aviation Brigade, at Robinson Army Airfield (AR) — (Arkansas Army National Guard)
  - Headquarters Support Company, 77th Combat Aviation Brigade, at Robinson Army Airfield (AR)
  - 1st Battalion (Security & Support), 114th Aviation Regiment, at Robinson Army Airfield (AR) — (Arkansas Army National Guard)
  - 3rd Battalion (General Support Aviation), 238th Aviation Regiment, at Abrams Airport (MI) — (Michigan Army National Guard)
  - 1st Battalion (Assault), 147th Aviation Regiment, at Truax Field (WI) — (Wisconsin Army National Guard)
  - 2nd Battalion (Assault), 285th Aviation Regiment, at Papago Army Heliport (AZ) — (Arizona Army National Guard)
  - 777th Aviation Support Battalion, at Robinson Army Airfield (AR) — (Arkansas Army National Guard)
