= 185th =

185th may refer to:

- 185th (2/1st West Riding) Brigade, formation of the Territorial Force of the British Army
- 185th Air Refueling Squadron flies the KC-135 Stratotanker
- 185th Air Refueling Wing (ARW), unit located at Sioux Gateway Airport, Iowa
- 185th Infantry Division "Folgore", Parachute Division of the Italian Army during World War II
- 185th Armor Regiment (United States), consists of soldiers from the California Army National Guard
- 185th Aviation Brigade (United States), aviation brigade of the United States Army
- 185th Canadian Infantry Battalion (Cape Breton Highlanders), CEF, unit in the Canadian Expeditionary Force during the First World War
- 185th Fighter-Bomber Aviation Regiment, Mixed Aviation Regiment, part of the SFR Yugoslav Air Force
- 185th Infantry Brigade (United Kingdom), the codename of one of the five main landing beaches in the Allied invasion of Normandy in 1944
- 185th Infantry Regiment (United States), combat regiment of the United States Army made up of soldiers from the California Army National Guard
- 185th Ohio Infantry (or 185th OVI) was an infantry regiment in the Union Army during the American Civil War
- 185th Street (Manhattan)
- Pennsylvania's 185th Representative District, electoral district of the Pennsylvania House of Representatives
- Willow Creek / Southwest 185th Avenue Transit Center, light rail station and transit center on the MAX Blue Line in Hillsboro, Oregon, United States

== See also ==
- 185 (number)
- AD 185, the year 185 (CLXXXV) of the Julian calendar
- 185 BC
