= 135th Aviation Regiment =

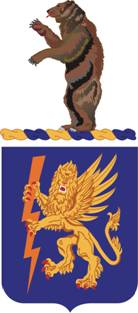
- 2d Battalion, 135th Aviation Regiment Insignia
- Active: 1985 – present
- Country: United States
- Branch: Army National Guard
- Type: Aviation regiment
- Size: 300
- Part of: Colorado Army National Guard
- Garrison/HQ: Buckley Space Force Base, Colorado
- Nickname: Blackjacks
- Motto: "Poised to Strike"
- Colors: Black and gold
- Engagements: Iraq War

Insignia
- Identification symbol: Skull with crossed swords

Aircraft flown
- Attack helicopter: AH-64D Apache
- Cargo helicopter: CH-47F Chinook
- Utility helicopter: UH-60L Black Hawk

The 135th Aviation Regiment is an Aviation Branch regiment of the United States Army, first formed in August 1985.

The regiment was constituted in August 1985 with the activation of the 35th Infantry Division as an Attack Battalion flying AH-1S Cobra's. The regiment was originally formed as a part of the 135th Aviation Regiment with Regimental Headquarters located in Frankfort, Kentucky, 1st Battalion in Missouri and 2nd Battalion as a part of the Colorado Army National Guard as 2nd Battalion 135th Aviation, under the United States Army Regimental System. It was concurrently organized from new and existing units to consist of the 1st and 2d Battalions and Companies D, E, and F, elements of the 35th Infantry Division, and Company G.

It was reorganized 1 December 1987 to consist of the 1st and 2d Battalions and Companies D, E, and F, elements of the 35th Infantry Division, the 3d Battalion, and Company G.

Reorganized 1 September 1996 in the Arkansas, Colorado, Iowa, Kentucky, and Missouri Army National Guard to consist of the 1st and 2d Battalions and Company F, elements of the 35th Infantry Division, the 3d Battalion, and Company G.

Reorganized 1 September 1998 to consist of the 1st and 2d Battalions and Company F, elements of the 35th Infantry Division, and the 3d Battalion.

== 1st Battalion, 135th Aviation Regiment ==
1st Battalion currently only flies the Sikorsky UH-60 Black Hawk

== 2nd Battalion, 135th Aviation Regiment (General Support) ==
The 2nd Battalion (General Support), 135th Aviation Regiment first became a part of the Colorado Army National Guard in the mid-1980s. The original unit, a single company, was made a part of the 40th Infantry Division's aviation brigade, predominantly located in California. The battalion flies the UH-60 Black Hawk, Boeing CH-47 Chinook. They are based out of Buckley Space Force Base, Colorado, as part of the Colorado Army National Guard Aviation Command.

The 2-135th deployed to Iraq in September 2006 through August 2007 as part of Task Force Mustang. In 2006 the 2d Battalion was deployed for Iraq War service. The 2-135th deployed on 19 March 2006 for five months of Theater Immersion Training at Fort Hood, Texas and Fort Sill, Oklahoma. They were certified "Fit to Fight" by Lt. Gen. Russel L. Honoré, commanding general, First United States Army, on 30 July 2006. The unit shipped to Kuwait in August 2006, completed a couple of weeks of "boots on the ground" training at Camp Buehring, and entered Iraq in the first half of September as one of five battalions of Task Force Mustang. The battalion principally flew out of Balad Air Base (aka Camp Anaconda) and is flew missions all over Iraq. The total deployment for the 2-135th was expected to last approximately 18 months.

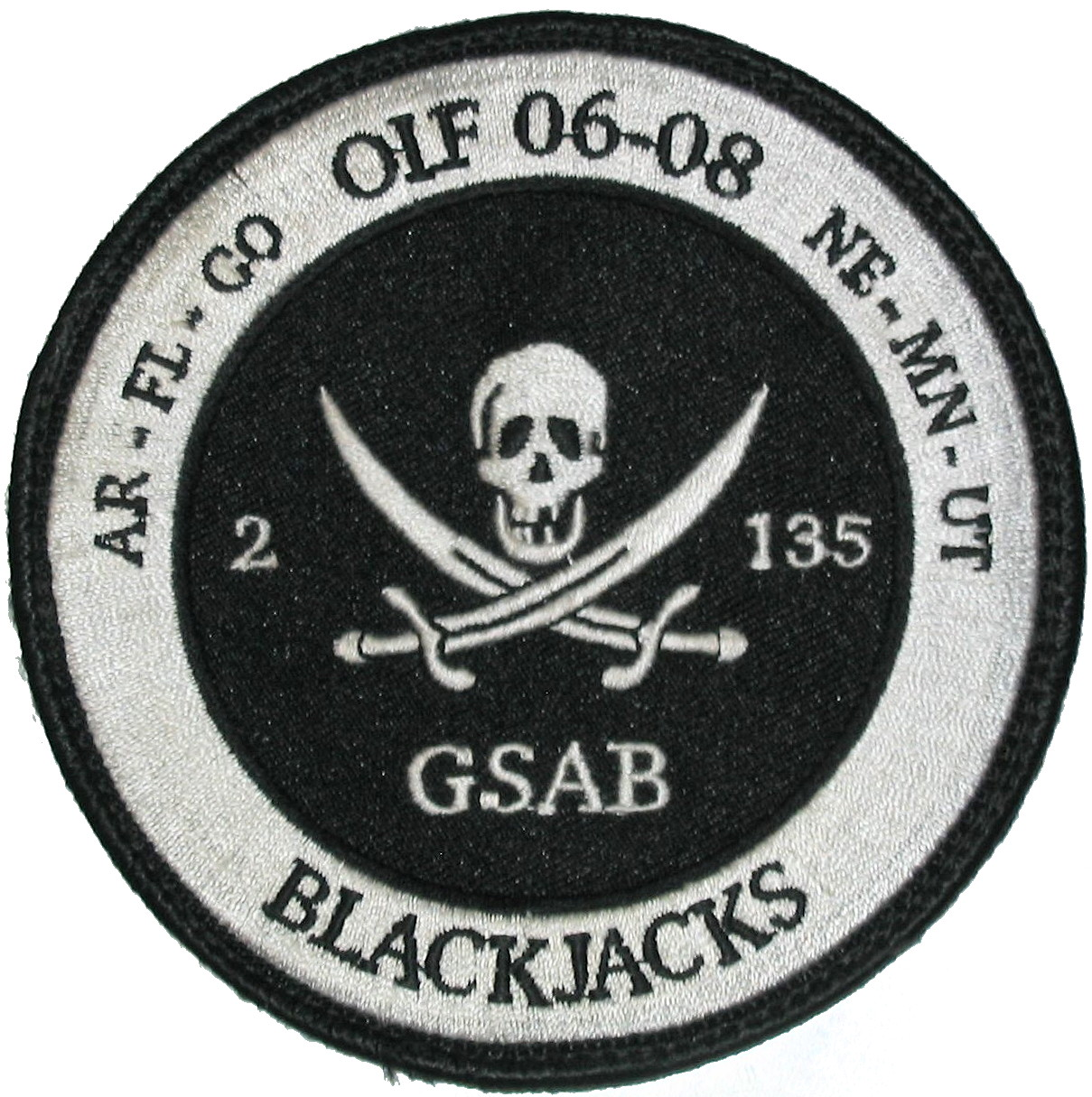
Iraq expedition patch as part of 36th Combat Aviation Brigade

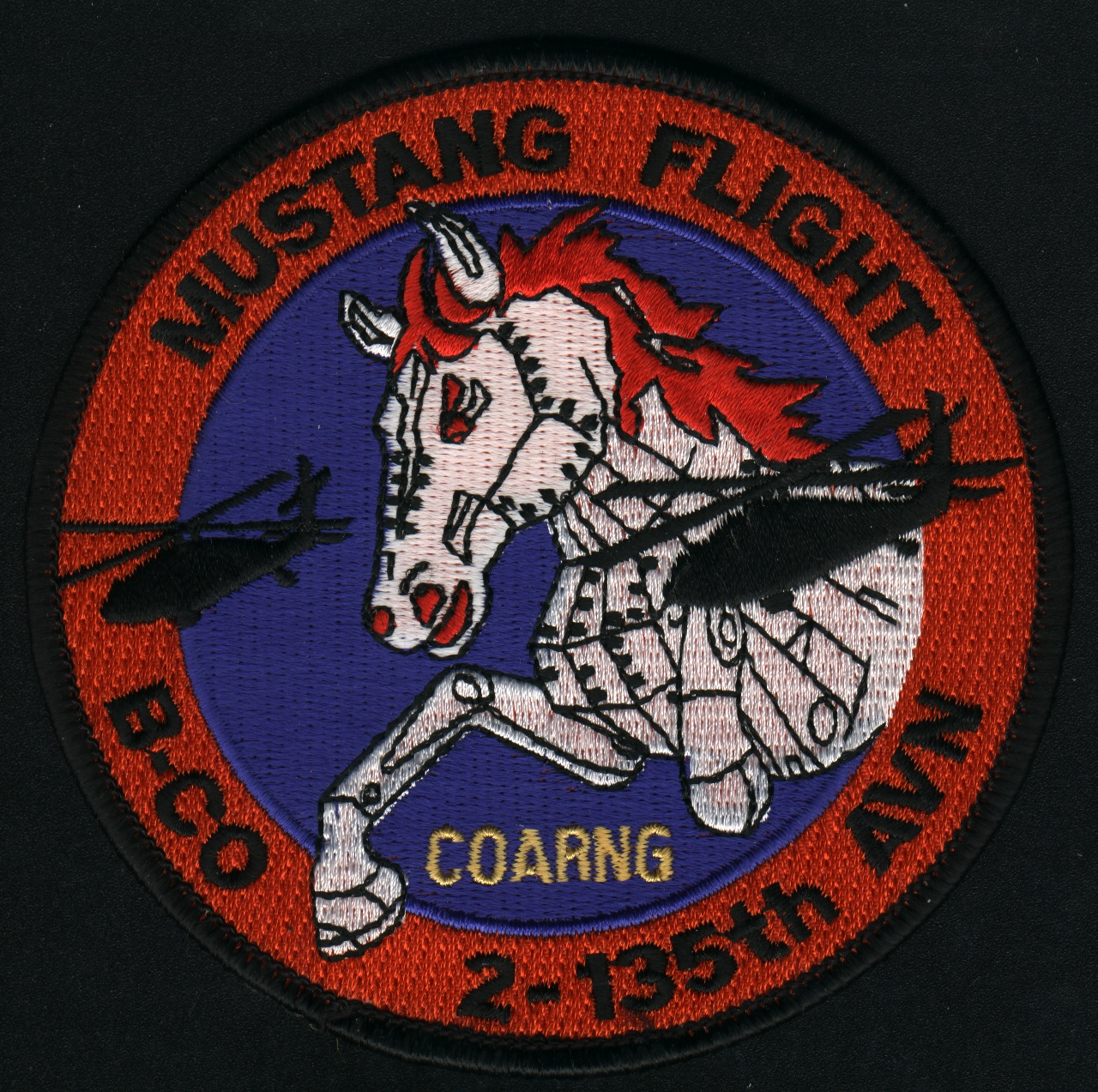
Colorado Mustang Flight

The battalion became fully engaged in the OIF mission on 17 Sep 2006, crosstraining with the previous unit, and had an official transfer of responsibility from the 7–101st on 24 Sep 2006. Soldiers wore the shoulder sleeve patch of the 36th Infantry Division while in Iraq.

The Iraq formation of the 2-135th (as a unit of Task Force Mustang) consisted of approximately 550 soldiers and was approximately 60% made up of Colorado Army National Guard personnel. It also included Army aviation Guard personnel from three additional primary states, Minnesota, Nebraska, Utah with smaller contingents from Arkansas, Wyoming, Missouri and Florida.

The Iraq mission involved operations over a large expanse of the country of Iraq. The unit distinguished itself as one of the premier air assault units in the US Army, conducting 111 major, multi-night air assault operations—inserting over 15,500 troops into enemy landing zones across the Iraq theater in the span of only a year. "The Blackjacks" earned the Army Aviation Association of America's top National Guard aviation unit in 2007 for this.

=== 2006–07 Iraq units ===
- HHC – "Headhunters" – Headquarters and Headquarters Company
- Company A – "Rumrunner" – Blackhawks
- Company B – "Bootlegger" – Chinooks (Mile High Hookers)
- Company C – "Cutter" – Blackhawk MedEvac, including attached units
  - Company C 1–111th – "Painkillers" – Blackhawks
  - Detachment 1, Company C, 1–111th – "Razorback Medevac"
- Company D – "Dagger" – Aviation Maintenance
- Company E – "Marauder" – Ground Maintenance, Aviation/Ground Fueling, Food Services

Company A of 2-135th from the Colorado ARNG was deployed to Iraq for one year, from the fall of 2005 to October 2006. This company is the normally organic Company A located with the battalion in Colorado. This company was selected to deploy with the 7th Battalion, 101st Aviation Regiment as the first Guard aviation unit to deploy from Colorado. They also informally served as a year-long advanced party for the battalion until they took over the mission of 7-101st in September 2006.

=== 2005–06 Iraq units ===
- Company A – Blackhawks

Company A, 2-135th during the Iraq deployment was (attached). Company A of the 2-211th from the Utah ARNG (home base West Jordan, Utah) serving, in Iraq as part of the beefed up 2-135th. It replaced Colorado's Company A after cross-training and handoff in September 2006.

Companies B, C, D, E and HHC of the 2-135th of the Colorado Army National Guard were all deployed to Iraq.

Company B, 2-135th (Colorado) was augmented by Company B of the 2d Battalion (General Support), 211th Aviation Regiment, Minnesota ARNG from Holman Field, St Paul, Minnesota.

Company C, 2-135th (Nebraska) was augmented by a detail from the Colorado ARNG.

All six companies were augmented for the Iraq deployment by additional ARNG personnel from other states as well as a few Individual Ready Reserve soldiers from across the United States. The battalion had approximately 550 personnel in Iraq fully augmented, whereas the more normal staffing in the Colorado guard is 300. The total distribution of personnel at the brigade level is available on the CAB, 36th Inf Div state personnel contributions page.

Company C, 1st Battalion, 111th Aviation Regiment of the Florida National Guard, and Detachment 1, Company C, 1st Battalion, 111th of the Arkansas National Guard were commanded by LTC Michael J. Rung, and were attached the 2d Battalion, 135th Aviation for additional medevac support during the OIF 06–07 rotation.

=== 2010–11 Afghanistan units ===
Company F, 2-135th (Louisiana and California) deployed to RC West and RC North in direct support of MEDEVAC missions for all coalition forces. While deployed and supporting MEDEVAC missions, CO F, 2-135th received the Valorous Unit Award (VUA) for "extraordinary heroism in action against an armed enemy."

=== 2012–2013, OEF-KU ===
Soldiers of the 2d Battalion (General Support), 135th Aviation Regiment were deployed as part of two Combat Aviation Brigades in support of Operation Enduring Freedom.

While deployed, the 2-135th played a significant role in more than 3,000 flight missions, accounting for more than 9,800 hours of flight moving 9,658 passengers and more than 825,000 pounds of cargo. The unit also helped transport nearly 5,600 distinguished visitors.

CAB medevac companies completed 234 medevac missions, four mass-casualty rehearsals and exercises, more than 25 medevac training iterations, and logged more than 765 hours.

On three separate expeditionary partnership missions, Task-Force Blackjack forward deployed to three additional countries, all while sustaining flight operations in Kuwait.

== Current structure ==
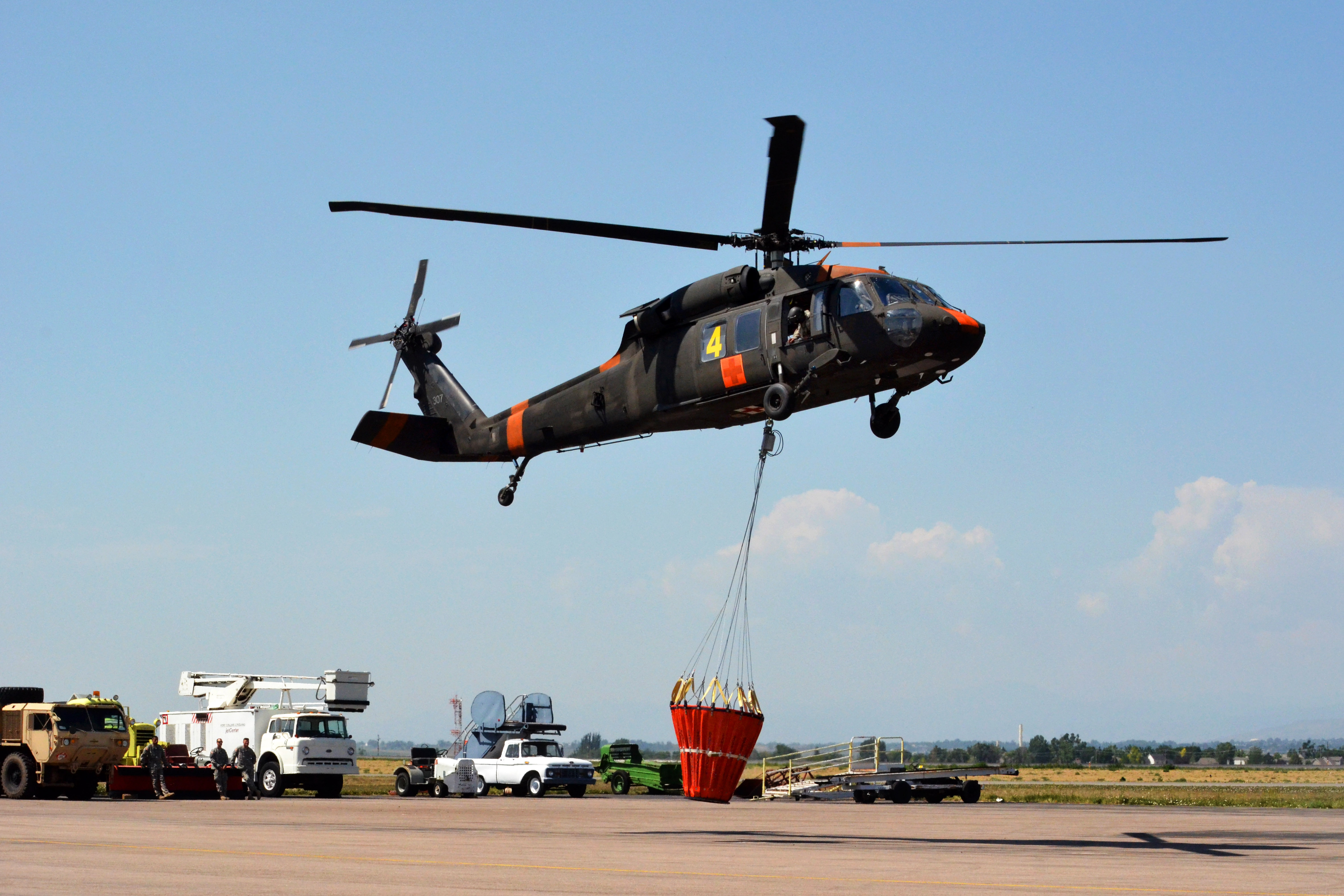
Soldiers in a UH-60 Black Hawk helicopter take off from Fort Collins-Loveland Municipal Airport

The current units of the regiment are:

- 1st Battalion
  - Company C - AH-64 Apache (MS ARNG)
- 2nd Battalion (General Support)
  - HHC – "Headhunters" – Headquarters and Headquarters Company (CO ARNG)
  - Company A – "Smugglers" – UH-60 Blackhawk, at Fort Bragg (NC) (US Army Reserve)
  - Company B (Heavy) – "Bootlegger" – CH-47F Chinook
    - Detachment 1 (CO ARNG)
    - Detachment ? (NE ARNG)
  - Company C (MEDEVAC) – "Adrenaline" – UH-60 Blackhawk
  - Company D – "Dagger" – Aviation Maintenance (CO ARNG)
    - Detachment 6 at Topeka (KS ARNG)
  - Company E – "Marauder" – Ground Maintenance, Aviation/Ground Fueling, Food Services (CO ARNG)
  - Company F (Heavy) – "Hooker" – CH-47F Chinook, at Joint Base Lewis–McChord (WA) (US Army Reserve)
  - Company G (MEDEVAC) – "Ventilator" – UH-60 Blackhawk
    - Detachment 2
    - Deployed to Afghanistan November 2013 – September 2014 (KS ARNG)
  - Aviation Intermediate Maintenance (AVIM) – "Helmsmen"
- 3rd Battalion
  - Company B
    - Detachment 1 - C-12 Huron (FL ARNG), Northeast Florida Regional Airport

== See also ==
- List of United States Army aircraft battalions
