= Robinson Army Airfield =

Robinson Army Airfield MG Charles H. Wilson Army Aviation Support Facility
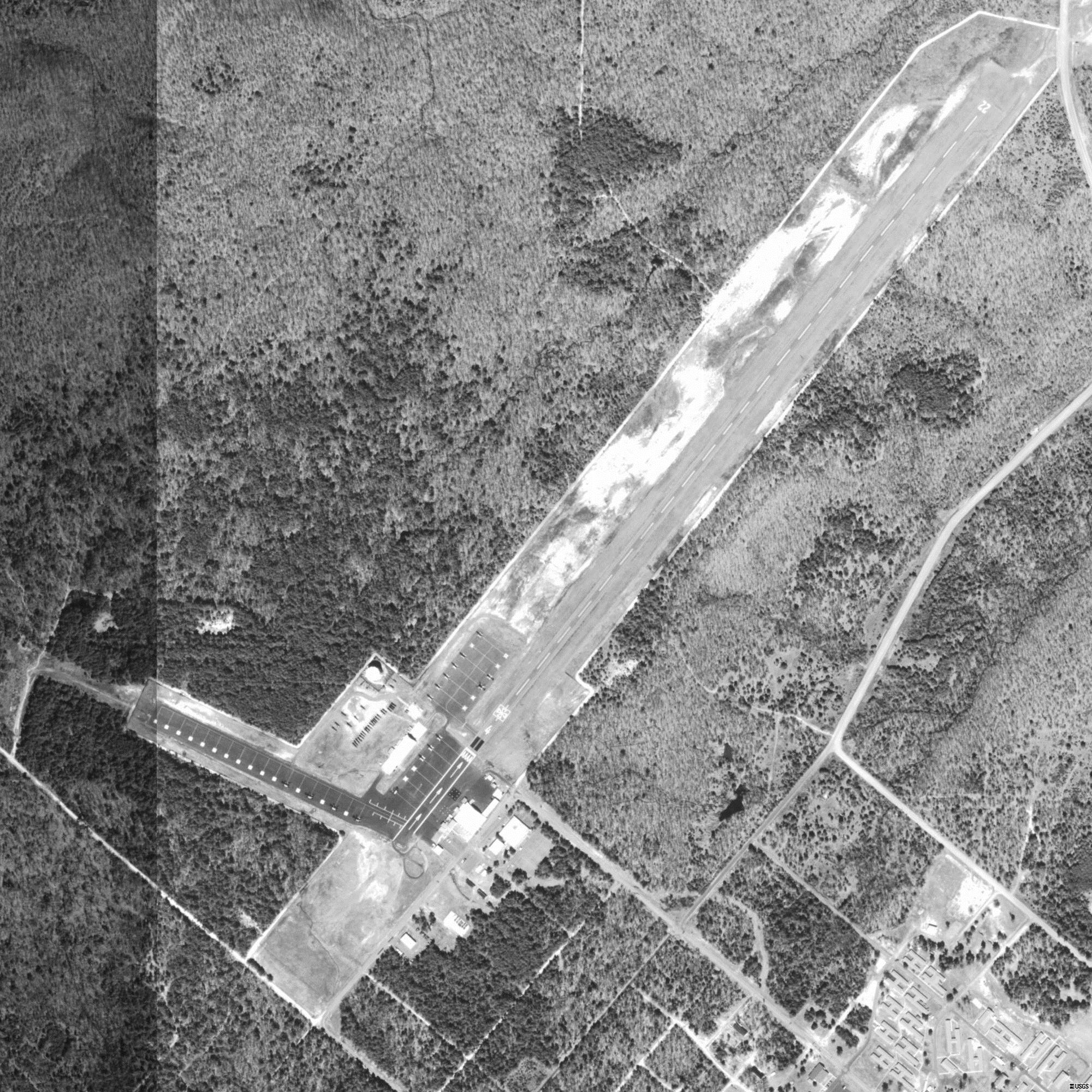
- USGS aerial image, 2001
- IATA: none; ICAO: KRBM; FAA LID: RBM

Summary
- Airport type: Military
- Owner: U.S. Army ATCA-ASO
- Location: Robinson Maneuver Training Center; Little Rock, Arkansas
- Elevation AMSL: 598 ft / 182 m
- Coordinates: 34°51′00″N 092°18′01″W
- Interactive map of Robinson Army Airfield; MG Charles H. Wilson Army Aviation Support Facility

Runways
Direction	Length		Surface
Direction	ft	m	Surface
4/22	5,702	1,738	Asphalt
- Source: Federal Aviation Administration

Robinson Army Airfield (ICAO: KRBM, FAA LID: RBM) is a military airfield at the Robinson Maneuver Training Center in Pulaski County, Arkansas, United States. The airfield is located five nautical miles (6 mi, 9 km) northwest of the central business district of Little Rock, Arkansas. It is located within the Robinson Maneuver Training Center in North Little Rock, which is home to the Arkansas National Guard.

Although most U.S. airports use the same three-letter location identifier for the FAA and IATA, this facility is assigned RBM by the FAA but has no designation from the IATA (which assigned RBM to Straubing-Wallmühle Airport in Germany).

== Units ==
- 77th Combat Aviation Brigade
  - Brigade HHC
  - 1st Battalion (Security & Support), 114th Aviation Regiment

== Facilities ==
Robinson AAF has one runway designated 4/22 with an asphalt surface measuring 5,702 by 75 feet (1,524 x 23 m).
