= 185th Aviation Brigade =

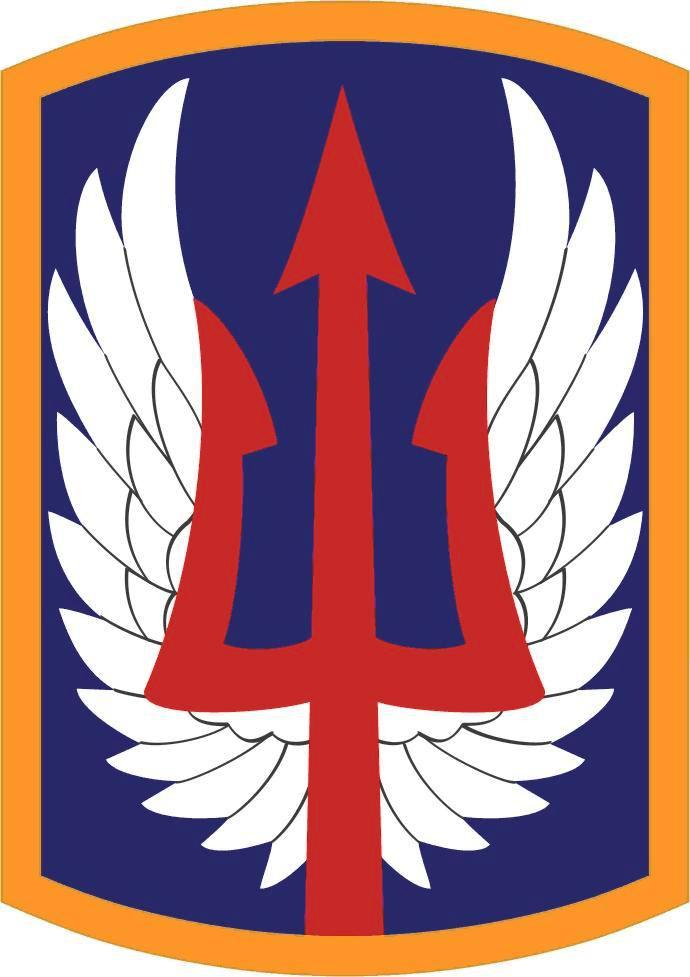
- 185th Aviation Brigade shoulder sleeve insignia
- Active: September 2006 – present
- Country: United States
- Branch: United States Army National Guard
- Type: Aviation
- Role: combat aviation
- Size: Brigade
- Part of: Mississippi Army National Guard
- Motto: Above Valor And Courage

Insignia
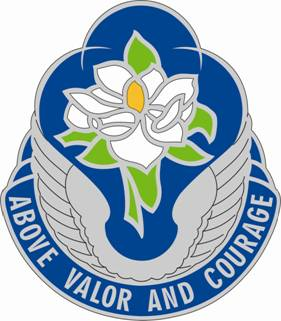
- Distinctive Unit Insignia

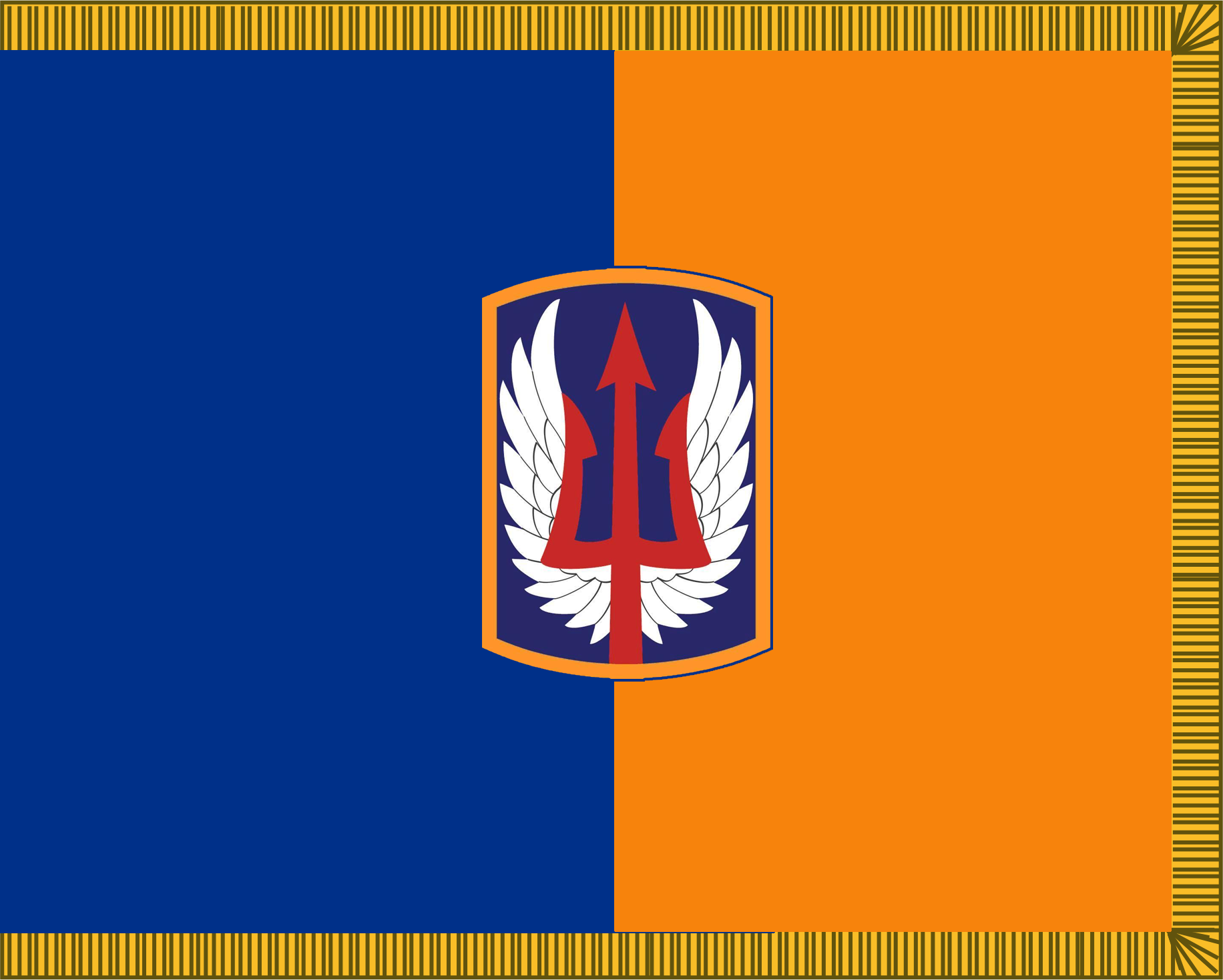
- 185th Aviation Brigade Flag

The 185th Aviation Brigade is an aviation brigade of the United States Army. It is a unit of the Mississippi Army National Guard with units throughout the state of Mississippi.

== History ==
US Army Aviation units were first organized in Mississippi in 1948 to support artillery units in the northern part of the state and Hattiesburg. These aviation units were located at Grenada Airport 100 miles north of Jackson, Mississippi, the state capitol. In January 1951, all army aviation units in Mississippi were ordered to active duty and sent to Fort Jackson, South Carolina. Six of the original ten aviators saw combat duty in the Korean War. The Grenada facility was closed during this time leaving no active army aviation programs in Mississippi.

In early 1953, the Mississippi Aviation program was reorganized at Hawkins Field in Jackson. Mississippi received its first helicopters, two Bell OH-13s, in 1954. By 1958, the program had expanded to include a total of 40 aviators.

The Mississippi Army Aviation program began operations as separate companies in 1959 and continued until 1968. During this time full-time maintenance support facilities were opened in Tupelo and Meridian.

The state’s first battalion sized aviation unit, the 131st Aviation Battalion, was formed on 15 February 1968. The 131st was in service until 1986 when it was restructured to become an aviation group. In 1987, the 131st Aviation Group was redesignated as the 185th Aviation Group.

In 1992, Company E, 185th Aviation in Meridian was redesignated Company G. This resulted in the company’s CH-54 Sky Cranes being replaced by twin-rotor CH-47 Chinook medium lift helicopters. In 1994 the mission of Company C, 1–185th Aviation in Tupelo was changed to armed aerial assault using the OH-58D/I Kiowa Warrior. Company C was then redesignated Company H, 185th Aviation. During 1996 Companies C and D, 1–185th Aviation in Jackson replaced their aging UH-1Hs with the UH-60 Blackhawk.

On 1 October 1999, Company H was reformed as Company D, 1–159th Aviation based at Fort Bragg, North Carolina. They are one of the first reserve component units in the nation to be part of an active component aviation battalion. The company is still located in Tupelo, Mississippi.

Aviation assets under the 185th that are presently located in Mississippi are:

- 1st Battalion, 185th Aviation Regiment (UH-60 Blackhawk), Army Aviation Support Facility Jackson
- 2nd Battalion, 185th Aviation Regiment (air traffic services), Southaven, Mississippi
- Company B, 1st Battalion, 111th Aviation Regiment (CH-47 Chinook), Army Aviation Support Facility Meridian
- Detachment 1, Company C, 1st Battalion (Security & Support), 114th Aviation Regiment (UH-72 Lakota), Army Aviation Support Facility Tupelo
- 1st Battalion, 149th Aviation Regiment (AH-64 Apache), Army Aviation Support Facility Tupelo

Headquarters, 185th Aviation Group was deployed to Iraq and stationed at Balad, Iraq for Operation Iraqi Freedom-II from January 2004 to December 2004. The 185th served as the aviation group for the entire theatre and controlled all aviation assets in the country of Iraq during their deployment. The 185th returned on 24 December 2004.

In September 2006 the 185th Aviation Group was redesignated as the 185th Aviation Brigade (Theater). It has since changed back.

In November 2010, 1st Battalion, 185th Aviation Regiment was again mobilized to serve in support of Operation New Dawn. Deploying to Iraq in January 2011, the Battalion served as the primary Aviation assets in Northern Iraq, based out of Camp Speicher near Tikrit. Company A was stationed at Camp Taji and served as the direct asset to the 25th Infantry Division at Camp Liberty in Baghdad. The 1–185th returned to the United States in November 2011.
