= 185th Brigade =

185th Brigade may refer to:

- 185th (2/1st West Riding) Brigade, United Kingdom
- 185th Infantry Brigade (United Kingdom)
- 185th Aviation Brigade, United States

== See also ==
- 185th Regiment (disambiguation)
- 185th Air Refueling Squadron
