= 186th Division (1st Formation) (People's Republic of China) =

186th Division (1949–52)
- Active: 1949.1 - 1952.11
- Country: People's Republic of China
- Branch: People's Liberation Army
- Type: Division
- Role: Infantry
- Part of: 16th Corps
- Engagements: Chinese Civil War

The 186th Division (Chinese: 第186师) was created in January 1949 under the Regulation of the Redesignations of All Organizations and Units of the Army, issued by Central Military Commission on November 1, 1948, basing on the 45th Brigade, 15th Column of Huabei Military Region. Its history could be traced to 3rd Military Sub-district, Taiyue Military District of Jinjiluyu Military Region formed in August 1948.

The division was composed of 556th, 557th and 558th Infantry Regiments. As a part of 62nd Corps the division took part in the Chinese Civil War, including the Taiyuan Campaign, Fumei Campaign and Lanzhou Campaign.

Since March 1950 the division was combined with Kangding Military Sub-district of Xikang Military District. Since then the division took part in the Campaign to Suppress Bandits in Southwestern China.

In September 1952, the division with its 556th, 557th Infantry Regiments, combining with 553rd Infantry Regiment from 185th Division were transferred to 16th Corps' control. Tank Regiment, 185th Division was then activated.

In November 1952, the division was transferred to Air Defense Command of Northeastern Military Region.

- Headquarters, 186th Division was expanded to Headquarters, 101st Antiaircraft Artillery Division and Headquarters, 102nd Antiaircraft Artillery Division of Air Defense Force.
- 553rd Infantry Regiment was converted to 225th Anti-Air Surveillance Regiment.
- 556th and 557th Infantry Regiments were broken up as replacement units for the People's Volunteer Army fighting the Korean War.
- Tank Regiment, 185th Division was transferred to 107th Division.
