= 147th Aviation Regiment =

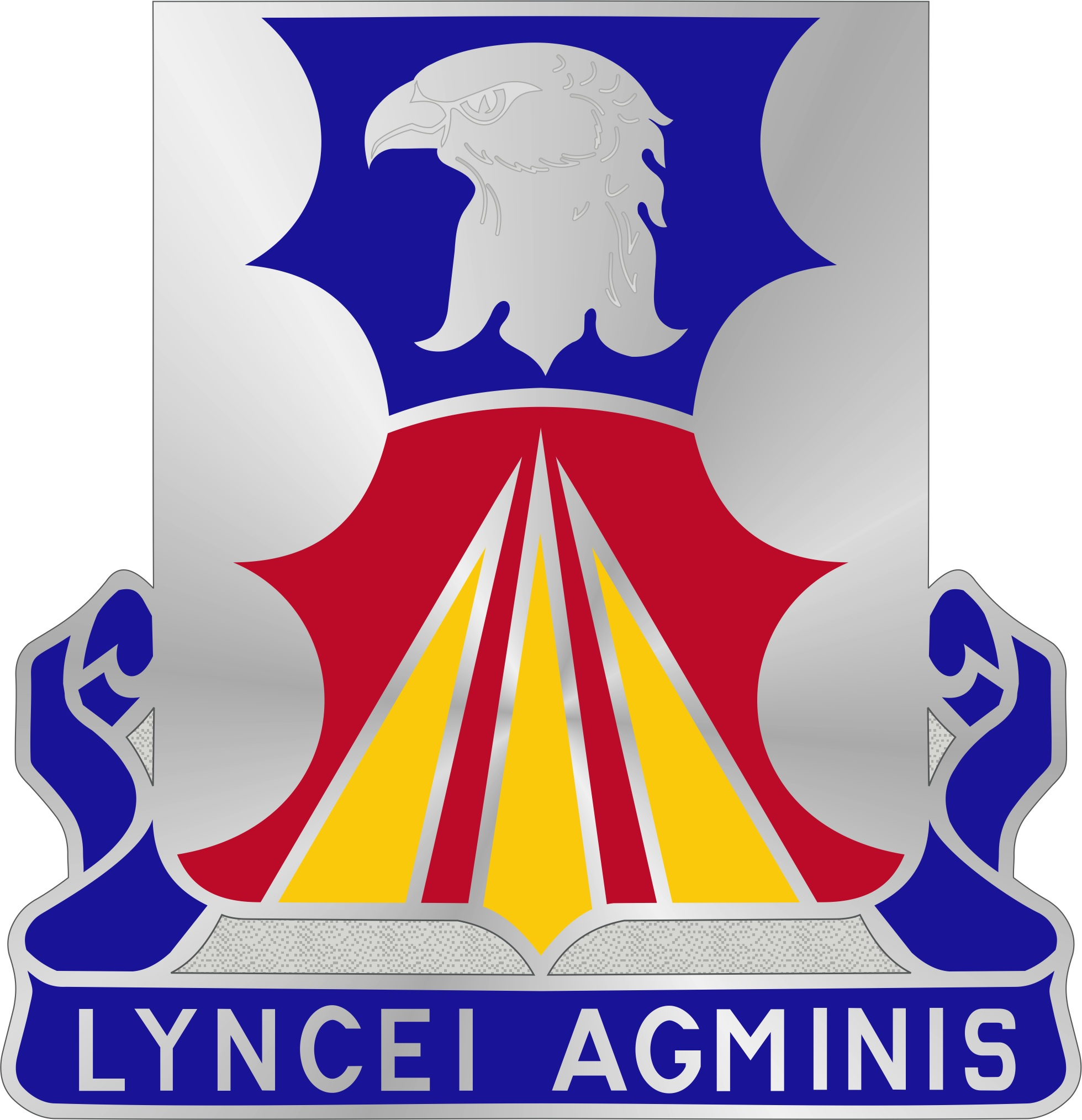
- Active: 1987-present
- Country: United States
- Branch: United States Army Aviation Branch
- Type: Aviation

Aircraft flown
- Utility helicopter: UH-60M Black Hawk

The 147th Aviation Regiment is an aviation regiment of the U.S. Army.

It was constituted 1 October 1987 in the Wisconsin, Iowa, and Minnesota Army National Guard as the 147th Aviation, a parent regiment under the U.S. Army Regimental System; and concurrently organized from existing units to consist of the 1st Battalion and Companies D, E, and F, elements 'of the 47th Infantry Division.

It was then reorganized on 1 September 1990 in the Wisconsin, Illinois, Iowa, and Minnesota Army National Guard to consist of the 1st and 2d Battalions and Company F, elements of the 47th Infantry Division; reorganized 10 February 1991 in the Wisconsin, Illinois, Iowa, and Minnesota Army National Guard to consist of the 1st and 2d Battalions and Company F, elements of the 34th Infantry Division; reorganized 1 September 1995 in the Wisconsin, Illinois, Indiana, Iowa, and Minnesota Army National Guard to consist of the 1st Battalion, non-divisional, and the 2d and 3d Battalions and Company F, elements of the 34th Infantry Division; reorganized 1 September 1 996 in the Wisconsin, Colorado, Indiana, Michigan, and Minnesota Army National Guard to consist of the 1st Battalion, non-divisional, and the 2d and 3d Battalions and Company F, elements of the 34th Infantry Division.

== Structure ==
- 1st Battalion
  - Headquarters and Headquarters Company
    - Detachment 1 at Abrams Municipal Airport, Grand Ledge (MI ARNG)
  - Company A at Truax Field Air National Guard Base, Madison (WI ARNG)
  - Company B at Grand Ledge (MI ARNG)
  - Company C at Grand Ledge (MI ARNG)
    - Detachment 1 (WI ARNG)
  - Company D (WI ARNG)
    - Detachment 1 at Grand Ledge (MI ARNG)
  - Company E (WI ARNG)
    - Detachment 1 at Grand Ledge (MI ARNG)
- 2nd Battalion (Assault Helicopter) (MN ARNG)
  - Headquarters and Headquarters Company
    - Detachment 2 at Boone Municipal Airport, Boone (IA ARNG)
  - Company A (UH-60)
  - Company B (UH-60)
  - Company C (UH-60) at Boone (IA ARNG)
  - Company D (Aviation Maintenance)
    - Detachment 2 at Boone (IA ARNG)
  - Company E (FSC)
    - Detachment 2 at Boone (IA ARNG)
