= 185th Infantry Division (German Empire) =

Military unit of the Imperial German Army in World War I

- Allegiance: German Empire
- Branch: Imperial German Army
- Engagements: World War I

The 185th Infantry Division (185. Infanterie-Division) was a formation of the Imperial German Army in World War I.
