= 185th Division (People's Republic of China) =

185th Division (1949–52)
- Active: 1949.1 - 1952.7
- Country: People's Republic of China
- Branch: People's Liberation Army
- Type: Division
- Role: Infantry
- Part of: 62nd Corps
- Engagements: Chinese Civil War

The 185th Division (Chinese: 第185师) was created in January 1949 under the Regulation of the Redesignations of All Organizations and Units of the Army, issued by Central Military Commission on November 1, 1948, basing on the 44th Brigade, 15th Column of Huabei Military Region. Its history could be traced to 2nd Military Sub-district, Taiyue Military District of Jinjiluyu Military Region formed in August 1948.

The division was composed of 553rd, 554th and 555th Infantry Regiments. As a part of 62nd Corps the division took part in the Chinese Civil War, including the Taiyuan Campaign, Fumei Campaign and Lanzhou Campaign.

Since February 1950 the division was combined with Ya'an Military Sub-district of Xikang Military District.

During its deployment in southwestern China, the division was gradually torn apart: in February 1951, 554th Infantry Regiment was transferred to 184th Division; in September, 553rd Infantry Regiment was transferred to 186th Division; in May 1952, 555th Infantry Regiment detached from the division and became 6th Independent Infantry Regiment of Southwestern Military Region.

In July 1952, the division was disbanded.
