= 149th Aviation Regiment =

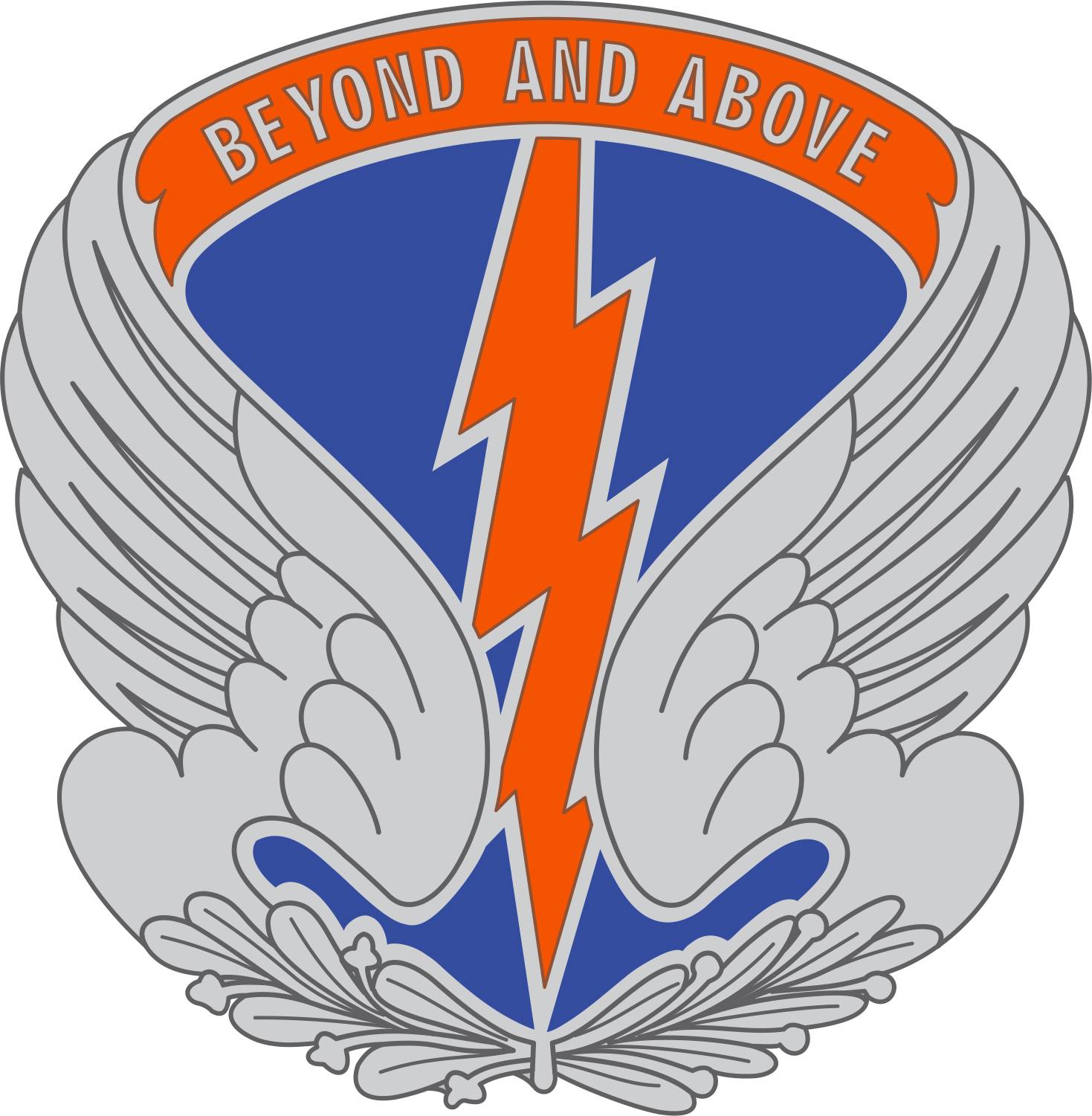
- Distinctive unit insignia
- Country: United States
- Branch: United States Army
- Type: Aviation

Insignia
- Coat of arms

Aircraft flown
- Attack helicopter: AH-64D Apache
- Cargo helicopter: CH-47F Chinook
- Utility helicopter: UH-60L Black Hawk

The 149th Aviation Regiment is an aviation regiment of the U.S. Army.

== Structure ==
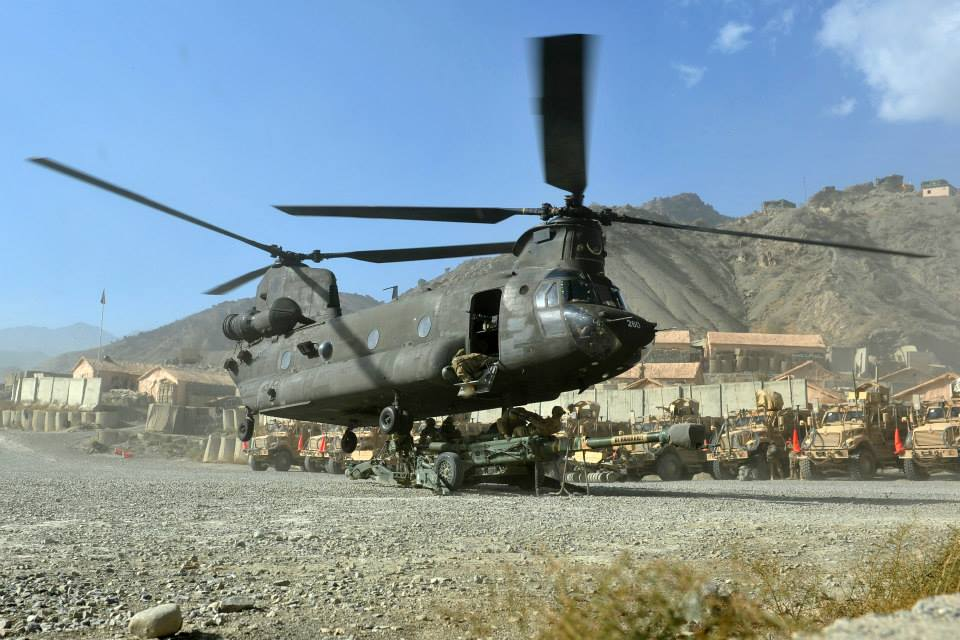
CH-47 Chinook helicopter with Bravo Company, 2nd Battalion, 149th Aviation Regiment, Texas / Oklahoma National Guard

- 1st Battalion (TX ARNG) (Attack Reconnaissance) at Ellington Field, Joint Reserve Base, Houston. Due to move to Kelly Field, Joint Base San Antonio
  - Company A (AH-64D) (MSARNG)
  - Company B (AH-64D) - due to upgrade to AH-64E
  - Company C (AH-64D) - due to upgrade to AH-64E
- 2nd Battalion (General Support)
  - Headquarters and Headquarters Company
    - Detachment 1 (AR ARNG)
  - Company A (AR ARNG)
  - Company B (CH-47)
    - Detachment 1 (OK ARNG)
  - Company C (TX ARNG) (UH-60L MEDEVAC) - Due to move to Kelly Field, Joint Base San Antonio from Maritindale Army Airfield, San Antonio
    - Detachment ?
    - Detachment ?
  - Company D
    - Detachment 1 (AR ARNG)
  - Company E
    - Detachment 1 (AR ARNG)
  - Company F (TX ARNG)
  - Company G (UH-60) (NM ARNG)
