= Robinson Maneuver Training Center =

Military installation of the Arkansas Army National Guard

Camp Joseph T. Robinson
- North Little Rock, Arkansas

Site information
- Controlled by: Arkansas National Guard
- Website: arkansas.nationalguard.mil/Home/Camp-Joseph-T-Robinson/

Location
- Coordinates: 34.824°N 92.284°W

Site history
- Built: 1917
- In use: 1917–present

Garrison information
- Garrison: 39th Infantry Brigade Combat Team; 77th Combat Aviation Brigade; 87th Troop Command

Robinson Maneuver Training Center, also known as Camp Joseph T. Robinson, is a 32,000-acre (13,000 ha) Arkansas Army National Guard installation located in North Little Rock, Pulaski County, Arkansas. It hosts the Joint Force Headquarters of the Arkansas National Guard, the Headquarters of the Arkansas Air National Guard, the Headquarters of the 77th Combat Aviation Brigade, the Headquarters of the 87th Troop Command, and the Camp Pike U.S. Armed Forces Reserve Complex. The installation is also home to three National Guard training centers: The National Guard Professional Education Center (PEC), the National Guard Marksmanship Training Center (NGMTC), and the 233d Regiment (Regional Training Institute).

== History ==
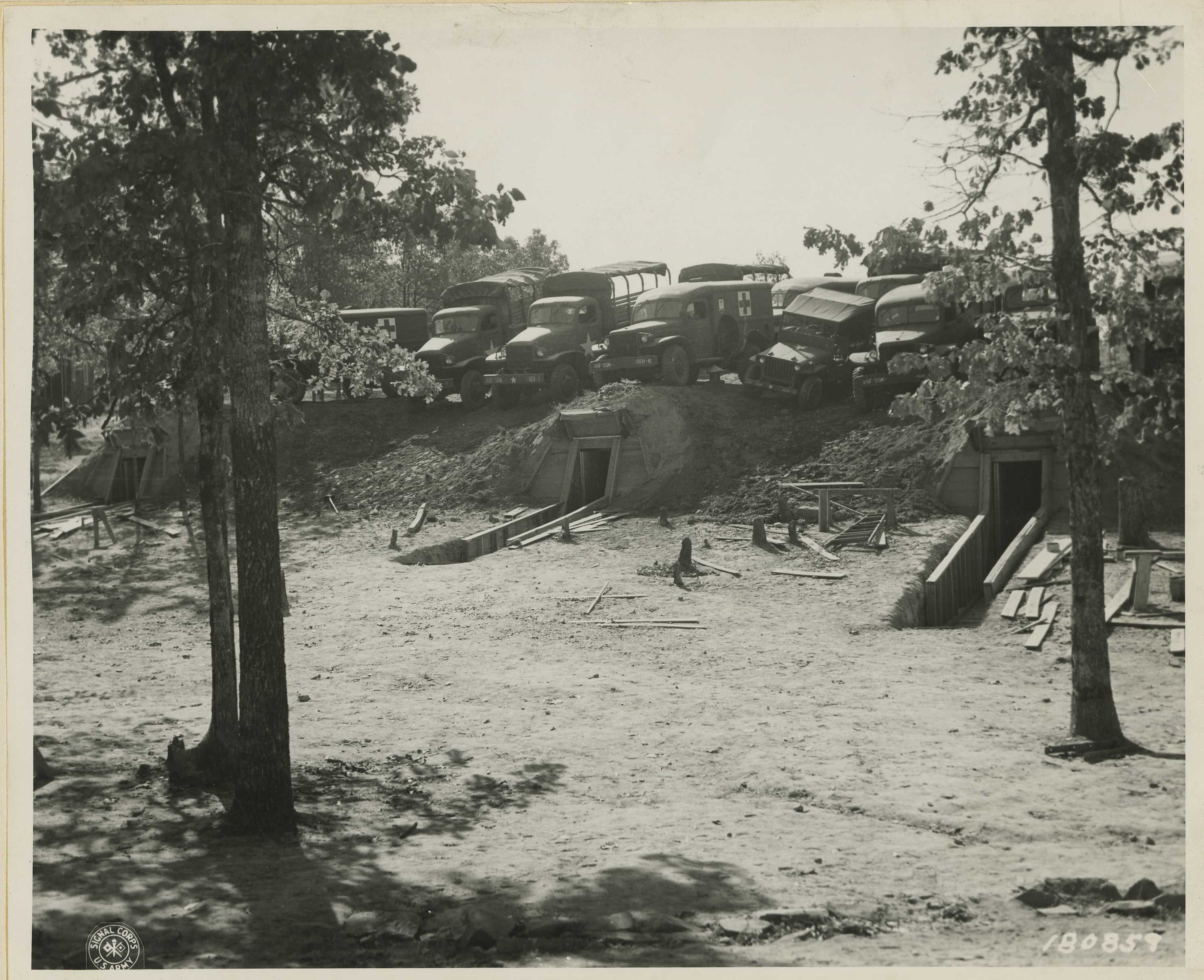
An underground hospital dug out of sandstone and solid rock at Camp Joseph T. Robinson (1943)

Established on 18 July 1917, the facility was originally named Camp Pike in honor of U.S. Army Brigadier General Zebulon Pike. Camp construction was supervised by Major John R. Fordyce, the son of Samuel W. Fordyce. It was garrisoned by the 162d Depot Brigade and used for the mobilization of the 87th Division during World War I. The post was also the site of an Infantry central Officers' Training School; during the war, the camp and the school were commanded by Charles Miller. From 1919 to 1921, Camp Pike was the home of the 3rd Division. In 1921, the 3rd Division was relocated to Camp Lewis in Washington state and the facility was transferred to the Arkansas National Guard. In 1922, the Arkansas National Guard headquarters were moved there. In 1937, it was renamed Camp Joseph T. Robinson in honor of the late U.S. senator Joseph T. Robinson of Arkansas.

In 1939, discussions began over enlarging the facility and creating a U.S. Army training camp in preparation for World War II. The original buildings built for World War I were demolished, and construction of the new enlarged camp began in fall 1940. In early 1941, the 35th Infantry Division was assigned to the camp for one year of training, before departing for California after the Pearl Harbor attacks in December 1941. On 20 December 1941, the Medical Department was authorized a fourth replacement training center, and Camp Robinson proved to be an ideal location. The center was activated on 15 January 1942, and the first group of trainees arrived on 5 February. Between February 1942 and October 1943, seven training cycles were completed, with enrollment at any one time ranging from 5,000 to 7,000 soldiers. In June 1943, it was announced that Camp Robinson would be phased out of the Medical Department's training program, and the last trainees graduated on 14 October, whereupon the center was inactivated. Additionally, a "branch immaterial" replacement training center (BIRTC) was operated at Camp Robinson from January 1942 until September 1943. It provided a shortened course of eight weeks of training to men who could be assigned to whatever branch had immediate needs. Most graduates of the center ended up assigned to infantry units, however. From July 1942 through the end of the year, the center was also used to train men intended for drastic expansion of United States Army Services of Supply (S0S) units in six-week cycles, as the capacities of the branch's replacement training centers was insufficient. The War Department began to induct "limited service" men in the fall of 1942, and they were trained in facilities vacated by the SOS trainees. In the spring of 1943, branch immaterial training was extended to thirteen weeks in length, essentially matching the existing infantry training program. Beginning in May 1943, BIRTC activities at Camp Robinson were gradually wound down; as each training unit graduated, the cadres were reassigned to the newly established BIRTC at Camp Fannin, Texas. In May 1943, Camp Fannin was converted to a standard infantry replacement training center, and on 2 September 1943, the BIRTC at Camp Robinson was inactivated.

In 1943, three detention compounds with a 4,000-bed total capacity were built for German prisoners of war. In 1945, a fourth 1,100-bed compound was added. In 1946, Camp Joseph T. Robinson was returned to state control.

== Units ==
List of units at Robinson:

- 77th Combat Aviation Brigade
- 87th Troop Command Headquarters
  - HHC, 87th Troop Command
  - Recruiting and Retention Command
  - 106th Army Band
  - 61st Civil Support Team
- 39th Infantry Brigade Combat Team Brigade Headquarters
  - HHC, Infantry Brigade Combat Team
  - Company A, 239th Brigade Engineer Battalion
  - Company D, 239th Brigade Engineer Battalion
- Joint Force Headquarters
- RMTC Institute Support Unit
- Army Aviation Support Facility
- Detachment 30, Operational Support Airlift Command
- Medical Command
- 233d Regiment (Regional Training Institute)
- National Guard Marksmanship Training Center
- 326th Trial Defense Team

== Military education ==
=== National Guard Professional Education Center ===
Robinson is home to the PEC and its 75-acre campus consisting of 25 buildings and a total staff of approximately 420 military, civilian contractor personnel. We annually provide instruction to over 20,000 members of the military force. The Professional Education Center also hosts over 5,000 conferees annually from the National Guard, Army Reserve, Active Army, DOD, State and Federal agencies. These conferences typically provide 3 to 5 day training sessions covering specific subjects and discussions on a wide variety of issues such as: mobilizations and deployments; standards; new tactics, techniques, and procedures; and leadership development. The Army National Guard Senior Commanders' Conference, FORSCOM Command Readiness Program Conference, Winston P. Wilson Marksmanship Competition, Training and Requirements Opportunities Sourcing Conference, Army National Guard Fixed Wing Conference, and the Army National Guard Chief of Staff Advisory Council Conference are just a few of the conferences held at PEC.

=== National Guard Marksmanship Training Center ===
The Marksmanship Training Center (MTC) programs and provides institutional training within Marksmanship related activities which will enhance effectiveness of unit level training programs in the Army and Air National Guard and missions based on the collective requirements identified by NGB-ART-I (Individual Training Branch), the Army Program for Individual Training (ARPRINT) for the Army National Guard, the U.S. Army Reserve (USAR), and the Active Component (AC) in support of the Army's Modular Force. Administer NGB Marksmanship training and competitive programs at all levels, stressing the development of combat skills to improve proficiency above basic marksmanship requirements and increase battlefield survivability. Provides training, training support and validation of mission essential task performance for the Army SNIPER training programs. Conduct mobile training team assistance and/or assessment visits to units. The MTC provides coordinating authority, quality assurance (QA), assessment and accreditation oversight for training responsibilities. The MTC provides for the review and development of associated TATS courseware in response to the Army's training needs and the Contemporary Operating Environment (COE). Additionally, the MTC provides operational, training, administrative, logistical, and resource management support as required to accomplish the mission to train the Army Warrior within each respective State and Territory as specified and approved by The Adjutant General (TAG).

=== Regional Training Institute ===
The history of the 233d Regiment (Regional Training Institute) began in 1957 with the first Officer Candidate Class. The RTI provides training to Soldiers from all 54 States and Territories.

In 1984, General Herbert Temple had a vision to develop a two-week course that would hone and improve the soldier combat skills needed to win on the modern battlefield. For ten years the Battle Skills School trained soldiers from all over the United States on the basic skills of survival and small unit tactics.

The Total Army School System took shape in Arkansas as the 233d Regiment (Regional Training Institute) in October 1994. The 233d RTI was organized from the Arkansas Military Academy and the Battle Skills School combining their respective TDAs.

The Mission of the RTI is to train infantry and artillery, and communications military occupational specialties, as well as non-commissioned officer education, and officer candidate school. The 233rd operates the second largest infantry school in the Army, only second to Fort Benning. Approximately 1,930 soldiers graduated training at the RTI during Fiscal Year 06.
