= 185th Ohio Infantry Regiment =

- Active: February 25, 1865, to September 26, 1865
- Country: United States
- Allegiance: Union
- Branch: Infantry

The 185th Ohio Infantry Regiment, sometimes 185th Ohio Volunteer Infantry (or 185th OVI) was an infantry regiment in the Union Army during the American Civil War.

== Service ==
The 185th Ohio Infantry was organized at Camp Chase in Columbus, Ohio, and mustered in for one year service on February 25, 1865, under the command of Colonel John E. Cummins.

The regiment left Ohio under orders for Nashville, Tennessee, February 27. Detained at Louisville, Kentucky, and assigned to guard duty at various points in Kentucky from Owensboro to Cumberland Gap, with headquarters at Eminence, until September. 1865. Skirmish in Bath County, Kentucky, March 26. Performed garrison duty at Mt. Sterling, Shelbyville, LaGrange, Greensboro, Cumberland Gap, and other locations.

The 185th Ohio Infantry mustered out of service September 26, 1865, at Lexington, Kentucky.

== Casualties ==
The regiment lost a total of 35 enlisted men during service, all due to disease.

== Commanders ==
- Colonel John E. Cummins

== See also ==
- List of Ohio Civil War units
- Ohio in the Civil War
