= 185th (2/1st West Riding) Brigade =

Military unit

The 185th (2/1st West Riding) Brigade was a formation of the Territorial Force of the British Army. It was assigned to the 62nd (2nd West Riding) Division and served on the Western Front during the First World War.

== Formation ==
The infantry battalions did not all serve at once, but all were assigned to the brigade during the war.

- 2/5th Battalion, West Yorkshire Regiment
- 2/6th Battalion, West Yorkshire Regiment
- 2/7th Battalion, West Yorkshire Regiment
- 2/8th Battalion, West Yorkshire Regiment
- 1/5th (Prince of Wales's) Battalion, Devonshire Regiment
- 2/20th Battalion, London Regiment (from 9 August 1918)
- 212th Machine Gun Company
- 185th Trench Mortar Battery
