= 114th Aviation Regiment =

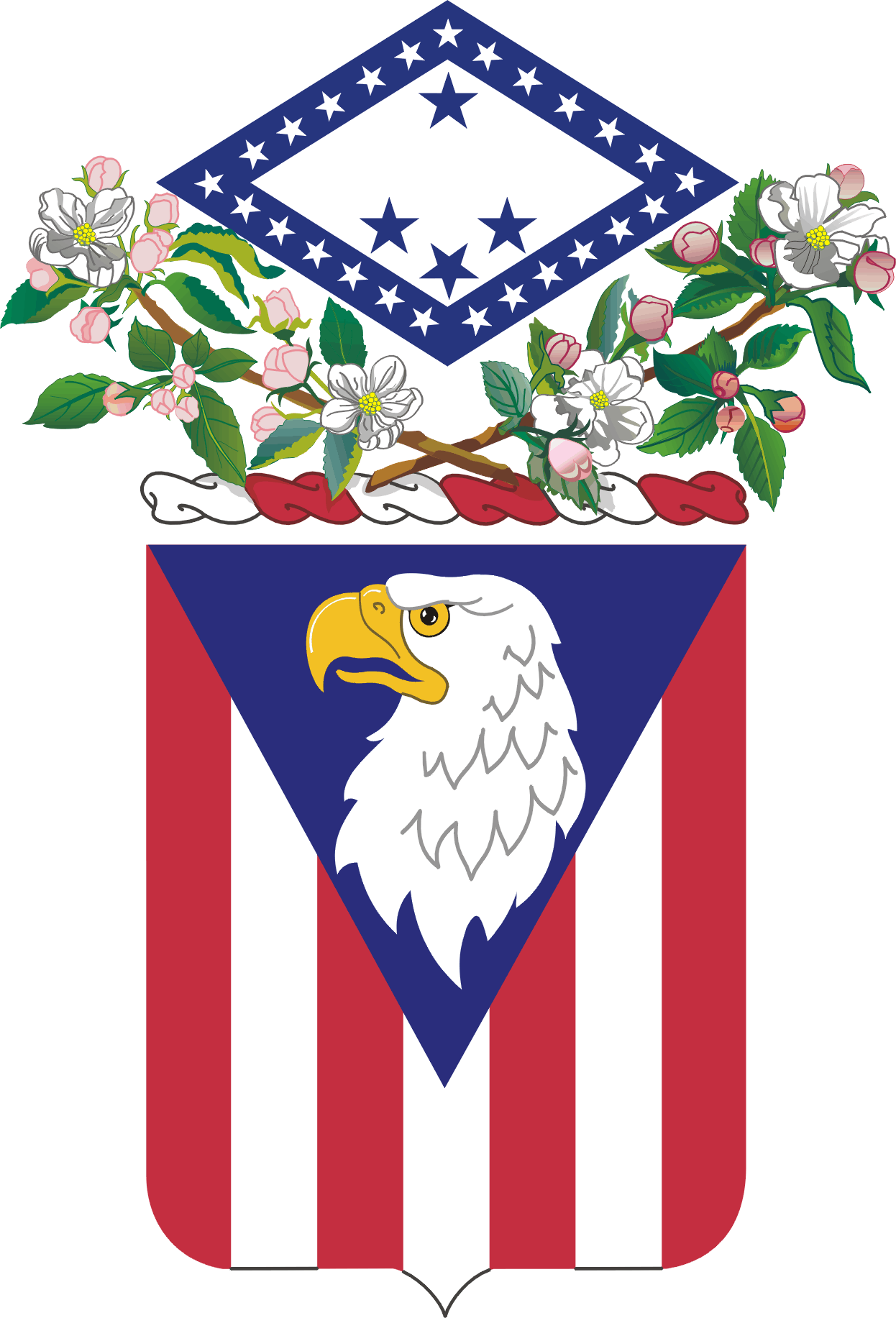
- coat of arms
- Country: USA
- Branch: United States Army Aviation Branch
- Type: Aviation
- Part of: 77th Combat Aviation Brigade
- Garrison/HQ: Robinson Maneuver Training Center

The 114th Aviation Regiment is an aviation regiment of the United States Army.

== Structure ==
The following units are part of the regiment:

- 1st Battalion (Security & Support)
  - Headquarters and Headquarters Company (ARARNG)
  - Company A (ARARNG)
  - Company B TXARNG
  - Company C (LAARNG)(MSARNG)
  - Company D PRARNG
    - Detachment 1 VIARNG
    - Detachment 2 (ARARNG)
