= 185th Aviation Regiment (United States) =

- Country: United States
- Branch: United States Army Aviation Branch
- Type: Aviation

Aircraft flown
- Utility helicopter: UH-60L Black Hawk

185th Aviation Regiment is an aviation regiment of the United States Army.

== Structure ==
- 1st Battalion
  - Headquarters and Headquarters Company
    - Detachment 2 at Army Aviation Support Facility #1, Barrow County Airport (GA ARNG)
  - Company A (UH-60)
  - Company C (UH-60) at Army Aviation Support Facility #1, Barrow County Airport (GA ARNG)
  - Company D (UH-60)
    - Detachment 2 at Army Aviation Support Facility #1, Barrow County Airport (GA ARNG)
  - Company E
    - Detachment 2 at Army Aviation Support Facility #1, Barrow County Airport (GA ARNG)
