= Tupelo Regional Airport =

Airport in Mississippi, United States

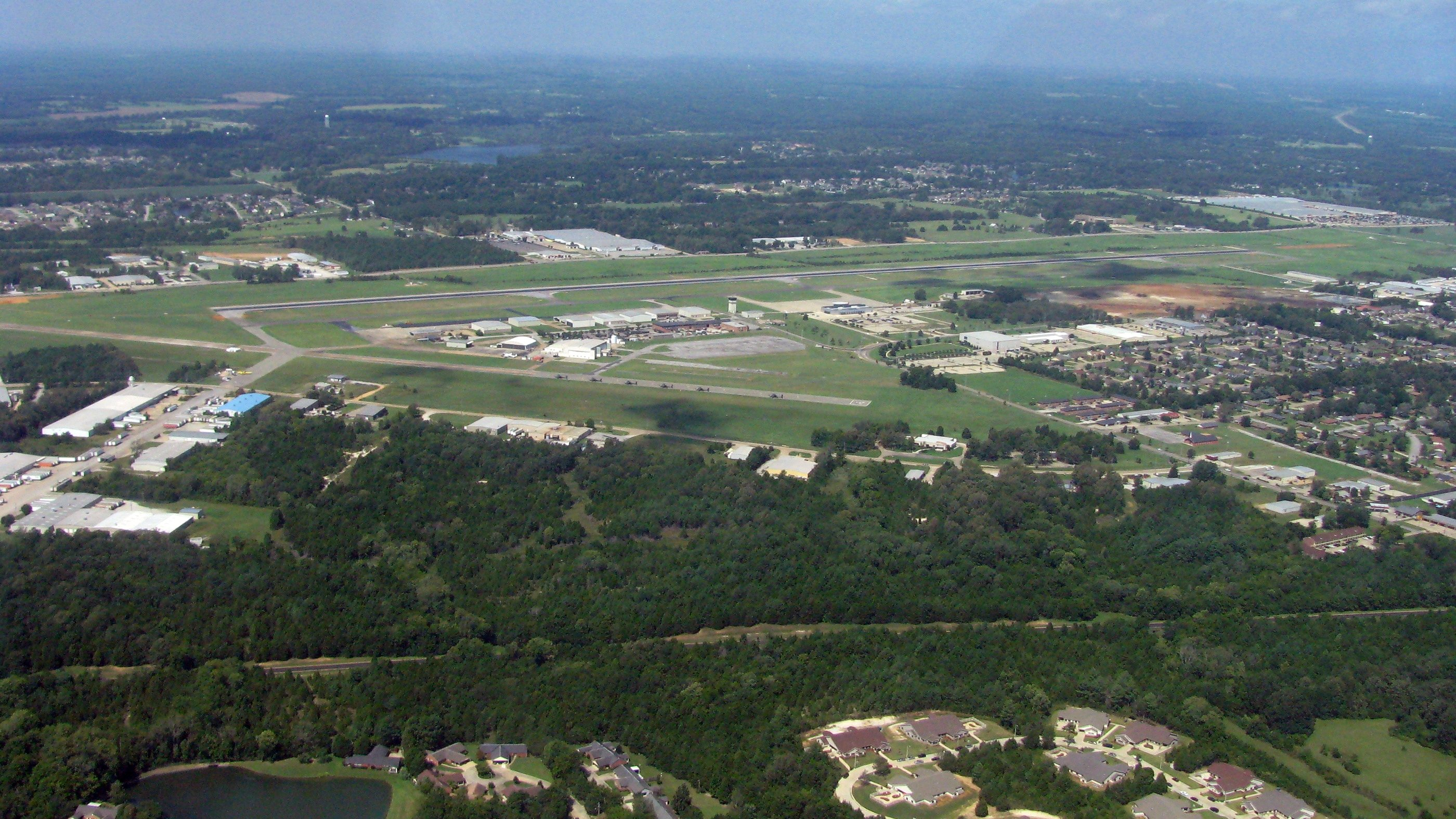
- Tupelo Regional Airport in 2008
- IATA: TUP; ICAO: KTUP; FAA LID: TUP

Summary
- Airport type: Public
- Owner: Tupelo Airport Authority
- Serves: Tupelo, Mississippi
- Elevation AMSL: 346 ft (105 m)
- Coordinates: 34°16′05″N 088°46′12″W
- Website: www.FlyTupelo.com

Map
- Location of airport in Mississippi TUP (the United States)

Runways
Direction	Length		Surface
Direction	ft	m	Surface
18/36	6,502	1,982	Asphalt

Statistics (2014)
- Aircraft operations: 51,598
- Based aircraft: 14
- Source: Federal Aviation Administration

Tupelo Regional Airport (IATA: TUP, ICAO: KTUP, FAA LID: TUP) is a public use airport located 3.7 miles; 3.2 nautical miles (6 km) west of the central business district of Tupelo, a city in Lee County, Mississippi, United States. It is owned by the Tupelo Airport Authority. The airport is mostly used for general aviation, but is also served by one commercial airline with scheduled passenger service subsidized by the federal Essential Air Service (EAS) program. Many college football teams visiting the University of Mississippi (Ole Miss), 49 miles west in Oxford, fly into Tupelo.

As per the Federal Aviation Administration, this airport had 15,985 passenger boardings (enplanements) in calendar year 2008, 13,319 in 2009, and 12,749 in 2010. The National Plan of Integrated Airport Systems for 2011–2015 categorized it as a primary commercial service airport.

== History ==
Southern Airways began serving the airport in 1952 with Douglas DC-3 aircraft, with three daily round trip flights operating a routing of Atlanta - Gadsden, AL - Birmingham, AL - Tuscaloosa, AL - Columbus, MS - Tupelo - Memphis for a total of six departures a day from the airport. By 1968, Southern Airways was operating nonstop flights to Columbus, MS, Memphis, and Tuscaloosa as well as direct flights to Atlanta and Birmingham, AL with all of their Tupelo service being operated with Martin 4-0-4 piston airliners. Southern continued to serve the airport during most of the 1970s with Martin 4-0-4 aircraft. Southern then eventually merged with North Central Airlines to form Republic Airlines which in 1979 was serving Tupelo with small Swearingen Metroliner turboprops with nonstop flights from both Atlanta (ATL) and Memphis (MEM). By 1981, Republic was operating larger Convair 580 turboprops into the airport with nonstop service from Memphis and Muscle Shoals, AL. However, Republic was no longer serving Tupelo by the summer of 1984. By early 1985, Scheduled Skyways, a commuter airline, was operating nonstop service from Memphis and Meridian with Nord 262 and Swearingen Metroliner turboprops while Flight Line, also a commuter air carrier, was serving the airport at this same time with small Cessna aircraft.

In late 1989 when Memphis (MEM) was a Northwest hub following the acquisition of Republic Airlines by Northwest Airlines, Northwest Airlink operated British Aerospace BAe Jetstream 31 and Saab 340 turboprop service on a code sharing basis on behalf of Northwest to Tupelo nonstop from Memphis, Columbus, MS, and Laurel, MS/Hattiesburg, MS. At this same time in 1989, American Eagle was operating flights on a code sharing basis on behalf of American Airlines with Swearingen Metroliner turboprops nonstop from both Nashville (BNA, an American hub at the time) and Tuscaloosa. Both American Eagle and Northwest Airlink were continuing to serve Tupelo in the spring of 1995 with American Eagle operating British Aerospace BAe Jetstream 31 turboprops nonstop from Nashville while Northwest Airlink was continuing to operate BAe Jetstream 31 and Saab 340 turboprops nonstop from Memphis, Columbus, MS, and Laurel, MS/Hattiesburg, MS. Following the merger in 2008 between Northwest and Delta, all Northwest Airlink service was subsequently replaced with Delta Connection code sharing flights on behalf of Delta Air Lines. Delta Connection operated nonstop flights to both Memphis and Atlanta (ATL), with the Memphis service eventually being discontinued. Delta Connection was serving Tupelo from ATL with Bombardier CRJ-200 regional jets by this time.

In 2012, after Delta Connection had ceased serving Tupelo, Silver Airways began service to Greenville, Muscle Shoals, and Atlanta using Saab 340s. Silver Airways then terminated service in October 2014 and was replaced by SeaPort Airlines. SeaPort flew for one year, ceasing their service by the end of October 2015. The airport was then without service for five months until April 2016 when Contour Airlines began flights with daily service to Nashville (BNA). Since April 2016, Contour has upgraded their service several times including replacing their twin turboprop BAe Jetstream 31 aircraft with Embraer ERJ 135 regional jets. Tupelo's annual enplanements have steadily grown and the airport has once again obtained Primary Airport status with the FAA in 2017, 2018 and 2019.

== Facilities and aircraft ==
Tupelo Regional Airport covers an area of 1,061 acres (429 ha) at an elevation of 346 feet (105 m) above mean sea level. It has one runway designated 18/36 with an asphalt surface measuring 6,502 by 150 feet (1,982 by 46 m).

For the 12-month period ending December 31, 2011, the airport had 50,916 aircraft operations, an average of 139 per day: 56% general aviation, 38% military, 6% air taxi, and <1% scheduled commercial. At that time there were 68 aircraft based at this airport: 35% single-engine, 22% multi-engine, 9% jet, 3% helicopter, and 31% military.

An additional primary function of the airport is to serve as an aircraft boneyard, including scrapping, parts recycling and aircraft storage. Universal Asset Management, an aviation company, has dismantled large, wide body jetliners at the airport including Airbus A330, Airbus A340, Boeing 747-400 and Boeing 777 aircraft for recycling.

=== U.S. Army National Guard aviation support facility ===
The Mississippi National Guard has AH-64 Apache and UH-72 Lakota military helicopters based at their facility located on the airport.

== Airline and destinations ==
=== Scheduled passenger service ===
Contour Airlines began daily nonstop flights in 2016 to Nashville using British Aerospace Jetstream 31 turboprop aircraft. On April 1, 2016, this service was upgraded with Embraer ERJ family regional jets being used for their scheduled passenger flights.

Airlines	Destinations	Refs.
Contour Airlines	Dallas/Fort Worth, Nashville	

== Statistics ==
Carrier shares: (October 2024 – September 2025)
Carrier	Passengers (arriving and departing)
Contour	29,710(100%)

Top domestic destinations: (October 2024 – September 2025)
Rank	City & IATA code	Passengers	Airline
1	Dallas–Fort Worth, TX (DFW)	8,410	Contour
2	Nashville, TN (BNA)	6,690	Contour

== Accidents and incidents ==
- On September 3, 2022, Tupelo Aviation employee Cory Wayne Patterson stole a 1987 Beech C90A plane from the airport and flew it above the Tupelo area, threatening to crash it into a nearby Walmart. After several hours, the plane landed safely in Ashland and Patterson was detained. He later died while in federal custody in Miami.
- On June 3, 2023, a small twin-engine aircraft crashed at the airport leaving 2 dead.

== See also ==
- List of airports in Mississippi
