= Abrams Municipal Airport =

Airport in Michigan, United States

- IATA: none; ICAO: none; FAA LID: 4D0

Summary
- Airport type: Public
- Owner: City of Grand Ledge
- Serves: Grand Ledge, Michigan
- Elevation AMSL: 842 ft (257 m)
- Coordinates: 42°46′27″N 084°43′59″W

Map
- Location of airport in Michigan 4DO (the United States)

Runways
| Direction | Length | | Surface |
| Direction | ft | m | Surface |
|---|---|---|---|
| 9/27 | 3,200 | 975 | Asphalt |
| 18/36 | 2,580 | 786 | Turf |

Statistics (2020)
- Aircraft operations: 12,400
- Based aircraft: 43
- Source: Federal Aviation Administration

Abrams Municipal Airport (FAA LID: 4D0) is a city-owned, public-use airport located two nautical miles (3.7 km) north of the central business district of Grand Ledge, a city in Eaton County, Michigan, United States. It is included in the Federal Aviation Administration (FAA) National Plan of Integrated Airport Systems for 2017–2021, in which it is categorized as a local general aviation facility.

The airport is accessible by road from Eaton Highway, and is located 2.1 miles (3.4 km) south of Interstate 96, just east of M-100.

== Facilities and aircraft ==
Abrams Municipal Airport covers an area of 160 acres (65 ha) at an elevation of 842 feet (257 m) above mean sea level. It has two runways: 9/27 is 3,200 by 75 feet (975 x 23 m) with an asphalt surface; 18/36 is 2,580 by 120 feet (786 x 37 m) with a turf surface. Runway 18/36 is closed to fixed-wing aircraft from November through April. The airport is staffed daily from 8AM until dusk.

The airport completed a runway upgrade and expansion in 2021. The main airport was resurfaced and had its lights upgraded.

The airport has a fixed-base operator that offers fuel as well as maintenance, a crew lounge, snooze rooms, and more.

For the 12-month period ending December 31, 2020, the airport had 12,400 aircraft operations, an average of 34 per day: 82% general aviation and 19% military. At that time there were 43 aircraft based at this airport: 22 single-engine and 2 multi-engine airplanes as well as 19 military aircraft.

Remarks:

- Activate MIRL runway 09/27 and REIL runway 27 - CTAF
- Intensive National Guard helicopter training on and in the vicinity of airport
- Runway 18/36 closed to fixed-wing aircraft November–April, soft in spring
- Avoid overflight of Grand Ledge below 2,000 ft (610 m)
- This airport has been surveyed by the National Geodetic Survey.
- TPA for helicopters 1,700 ft (520 m) MSL (858 ft AGL); fixed wing TPA 1,900 ft (580 m) MSL

== Accidents and incidents ==
- On June 25, 2007, a Piper J3F-65 ground looped on takeoff from Abrams Municipal. The left main landing gear collapsed during the accident sequence. The probable cause was found to be the pilot's failure to maintain directional control during takeoff resulting in a ground loop.

== See also ==
- List of airports in Michigan
