= 140th Infantry Regiment (United States) =

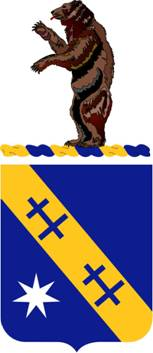
- Coat of arms
- Active: 1898–1899; 1901–1914; 1917–1919; 1921–1945; 1946–1968
- Country: United States
- Allegiance: Missouri
- Branch: Missouri National Guard
- Type: Infantry
- Nickname: "Sixth Missouri"
- Mottos: Siempre Listo (Spanish) ("Always Ready")
- Campaigns: Spanish–American War World War I: Meuse-Argonne; Alsace 1918; Lorraine 1918; World War II

Insignia
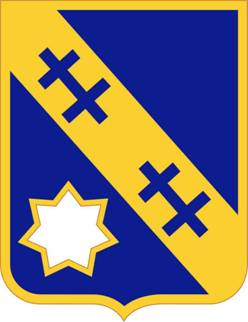
- Distinctive unit insignia

The 140th Infantry Regiment (also known as the "Sixth Missouri") was an infantry formation of the Missouri National Guard.

It was first organized as the 6th Infantry Regiment of the Missouri National Guard in 1898 during the Spanish–American War, and was soon mustered into Federal service as the 6th Missouri Volunteer Infantry Regiment. Mustered out following service in the occupation of Cuba, it was reorganized as the 6th Battalion of Infantry in 1901 and expanded into a regiment of the same number in 1908, but disbanded in 1914.

The regiment was reconstituted in 1917 for service in World War I, and in Federal service consolidated with the 3rd Missouri Infantry Regiment to form the 140th Infantry. Part of the 35th Division, it served with the American Expeditionary Forces in the Meuse-Argonne. Reorganized in 1921, it served in World War II in the continental United States, then was reactivated after the end of the war. The regiment was inactivated in 1968 amid a reorganization of the Army's reserve components, with its subordinate units converted into a variety of support units.

== Origins ==
The 6th Infantry Regiment of the Missouri National Guard was organized on 27 June 1898, during the Spanish–American War. As the 6th Missouri Volunteer Infantry Regiment, it mustered into Federal service between 20 and 23 July at Jefferson Barracks. The regiment served in the United States Army with the occupation force in Cuba, and mustered out at Savannah, Georgia, on 10 May 1899. Reorganized on 10 July 1901 as the 6th Battalion of Infantry in the Missouri National Guard, it was expanded into a regiment on 23 January 1908. It was again disbanded on 25 July 1914.

== World War I ==
On 29 June 1917, the regiment was reactivated for service in the First World War when it consolidated with elements of the 3rd Missouri to create the 140th Infantry in October 1917. The new regiment was assigned to the 35th Division. Within the 35th Division they were assigned to the 70th Brigade alongside the 139th Infantry. Companies of the regiment were drawn primarily from the southeast of the state; Company A hailed from Lexington, Companies B and C were recruited from St. Joseph, Company D came from Sedalia. Companies E, F, G, and H were recruited from Doniphan, Willow Springs, Richmond, and Dexter respectively. Companies I, K, L, and M were pulled from Kennett, Sikeston, Cape Girardeau and Poplar Bluff respectively. Additional troops were recruited from Jefferson City, Seymour, Carterville, and West Plains.

The regiment organized and trained in the United States at Camp Doniphan, Oklahoma and then shipped out for France where it began training under British tutelage in June 1918. In July, the 140th had its first taste of combat in the Gérardmer sector in the Vosges Mountains, where they conducted raids on German forces. They were moved to the Saint-Mihiel sector in September where they served as a reserve for the First Army. The regiment soon participated in the Meuse-Argonne offensive, the largest battle the American Expeditionary Forces waged during the war. After five days of intense battle, they were relieved by elements of the 1st Division and were placed in the Sommedieue sector where they launched harassing attacks on the enemy positions until the Armistice of November 11, 1918, ended the war. The regiment arrived at the port of Newport News on 18 April 1919 on the USS Nansemond, and was demobilized on 12 May 1919, at Fort Riley. Kansas.

== Interwar period ==
Per the terms of the National Defense Act of 1920, the 140th Infantry was reconstituted in the National Guard in 1921, assigned to the 35th Division, and allotted to the state of Missouri. It was reorganized on 1 October 1921, by redesignation of the 6th Infantry, Missouri National Guard (organized 31 March 1921; Headquarters concurrently organized and federally recognized at Cape Girardeau, Missouri), made up of companies raised in southern Missouri. The regimental Headquarters was relocated about June 1923 to Caruthersville, Missouri. The regiment, or elements thereof, was called up to perform the following state duties: riot control at a railroad workers’ strike at Moberly, Macon, and Poplar Bluff, Missouri, 31 July – 23 November 1922; a workers’ strike at New Madrid, Missouri, in May 1923; Mississippi River flood relief duty at Charleston, Sikeston, and Poplar Bluff, Missouri, 16 April – 12 May 1927 and January 1937; St. Francis River flood relief duties in June 1928 and every spring from 1932–1933 and 1935–1938. The regiment conducted annual summer training most years at Camp Clark, near Nevada, Missouri, from 1921–1939. For at least three years, 1938–1940, the regiment also trained some 81 company-grade officers of the 102nd Division at Camp Clark and Camp Ripley, Minnesota. The regimental headquarters relocated in January 1940 to Sikeston, Missouri. The regiment was inducted into active federal service at Sikeston on 23 December 1940, and moved to Camp Joseph T. Robinson, Arkansas, where it arrived on 4 January 1941. The regiment participated in the Louisiana Maneuvers in August-September 1941.

== World War II ==
When World War II broke out and America became involved due to the Attack on Pearl Harbor in 1941, the 140th Infantry moved to California in order to defend against possible Japanese attacks on the West Coast. The 140th Infantry was relieved of assignment to the 35th Infantry Division on 27 January 1943 and assigned to the Western Defense Command, engaging in coast defense duties. The regiment was transferred to Camp Howze, Texas on 5 February 1944, subsequently assigned to the XXIII Corps on 10 April 1944 and then to the XXXVI Corps on 19 September 1944. The 140th was assigned to the Replacement and School Command on 17 November 1944 and moved to Camp Swift, Texas on 10 December 1944, and later to Camp Rucker, Alabama, on 16 February 1945. At Camps Howze, Swift, and Rucker, the 140th Infantry Regiment was reduced to a training cadre, shipping 2,940 of its officers and men to overseas replacement depots, and subsequently provided an accelerated six-week course of infantry training (four weeks of familiarization, qualification, and transition firing, and two weeks of tactical training) to 2,900 men, who were formerly members of disbanded anti-aircraft and tank destroyer units or who had volunteered for transfer to the infantry from other branches of the Army. The 140th Infantry was inactivated on 20 September 1945, at Camp Rucker.

== Cold War ==
After the end of World War II, the 140th Infantry continued as part of the Missouri National Guard, assigned to the reorganized 35th Infantry Division on 20 June 1946. The regiment was organized in southeastern Missouri and its headquarters at Cape Girardeau, Missouri received federal recognition later that year on 16 October. As part of the ROAD reorganization on 1 April 1963, the 1st and 2nd Battle Groups became the 1st and 2nd Battalions, with the 2nd Battalion being designated mechanized infantry. On 15 January 1968, both battalions of the 140th Infantry converted into a variety of support units:

- HHC, 1st Battalion, 140th Infantry at Cape Girardeau became HHC, 1140th Engineer Battalion
- Company A, 1st Battalion, 140th Infantry at Jackson became Company A, 1140th Engineer Battalion
- Company C, 1st Battalion, 140th Infantry at Charleston became the 868th Medical Company of the 205th Medical Battalion.
- HHC, 2nd Battalion, 140th Infantry at Poplar Bluff became the 1108th Aircraft Support Company.
- HHC (part), 2nd Battalion, 140th Infantry at Doniphan became 1138th Military Police Company (part)
- Company A, 2nd Battalion, 140th Infantry at Dexter became 1221st Transportation Company.
- Company A (part), 2nd Battalion, 140th Infantry at Bernie became the 865th Medical Company of the 205th Medical Battalion.
- Company B, 2nd Battalion, 140th Infantry at Sikeston became Company C, 1140th Engineer Battalion.
- Company B (part), 2nd Battalion, 140th Infantry at Portageville became Company C (part), 1140th Engineer Battalion.
- Company C, 2nd Battalion, 140th Infantry at Kennett became 1137th Military Police Company
- Company C (part), 2nd Battalion, 140th Infantry at Caruthersville became 1137th Military Police Company (part)

The number of the 140th and its heraldry were inherited in 2001 by the 140th Regiment (Regional Training Institute), the training school of the Missouri Army National Guard.
