= 35th Engineer Brigade =

Combat engineer brigade of the United States Army National Guard of Missouri

- 35th Engineer Brigade shoulder sleeve insignia
- Active: 1928 - 1944; 1946 - Present
- Country: United States
- Branch: United States Army National Guard
- Type: Combat Engineer
- Size: Brigade
- Part of: Missouri Army National Guard
- Garrison/HQ: Fort Leonard Wood, Missouri
- Motto: No Task Too Large
- Engagements: Operation Iraqi Freedom; Operation Spartan Shield; Operation Inherent Resolve

Commanders
- Notable commanders: Richard D. Dean

Insignia
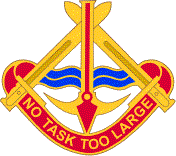
- 35th Engineer Brigade DUI

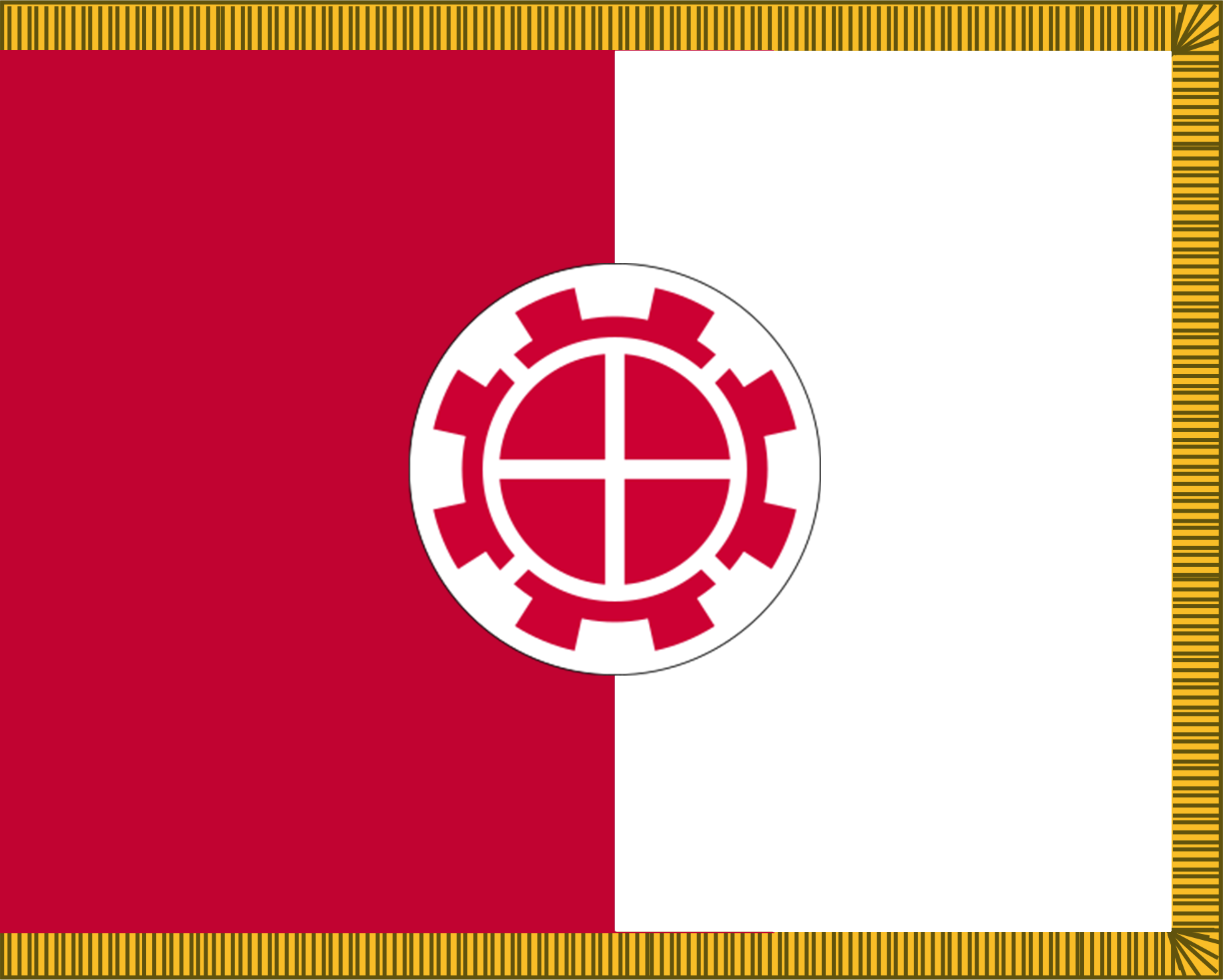
- 35th Engineer Brigade Flag

The 35th Engineer Brigade is a combat engineer brigade of the Missouri Army National Guard, located at Fort Leonard Wood, Missouri.

== Organization ==
As an Army National Guard formation, the 35th Engineer Brigade is commanded by the Governor of Missouri during peacetime, but it can be mobilized for federal service under the authority of the President of the United States. The brigade’s lineage is tied to units of the historic 35th Infantry Division, which has long included both Kansas and Missouri Army National Guard elements, although the brigade itself is not currently assigned to the division.

The brigade is headquartered at Fort Leonard Wood, Missouri, and consists of its Headquarters and Headquarters Company (HHC), two engineer battalions, and several supporting units. Its primary subordinate formations are:

- 35th Engineer Brigade, at Fort Leonard Wood
  - Headquarters and Headquarters Company, 35th Engineer Brigade, at Fort Leonard Wood
  - 235th Engineer Detachment (Construction Management Team), at Fort Leonard Wood
  - 635th Engineer Detachment (Forward Engineer Support Team — Advance), at Jefferson Barracks
  - 203rd Engineer Battalion, in Joplin
    - Headquarters and Headquarters Company, 203rd Engineer Battalion, in Joplin
    - Forward Support Company, 203rd Engineer Battalion, in Joplin
    - 276th Engineer Company (Vertical Construction Company), in Pierce City
      - Detachment 1, 276th Engineer Company (Vertical Construction Company), in Springfield
    - 294th Engineer Company (Engineer Support Company), in Carthage
    - 335th Engineer Platoon (Area Clearance), in Rolla
    - 1135th Engineer Company (Clearance), in Richmond
    - 1141st Engineer Company (Combat Engineer Company — Infantry), in Kansas City
  - 1140th Engineer Battalion, in Cape Girardeau
    - Headquarters and Headquarters Company, 1140th Engineer Battalion, in Cape Girardeau
    - Forward Support Company, 1140th Engineer Battalion, in Cape Girardeau
    - 220th Engineer Company (Engineer Construction Company), in Festus
    - 1138th Engineer Company (Combat Engineer Company — Infantry), in Farmington
    - 1438th Engineer Company (Multirole Bridge), in Macon
      - Detachment 1, 1438th Engineer Company (Multirole Bridge), in Moberly

== History ==
The 35th Engineer Brigade was originally organized on 17 July 1928 in St. Louis, Missouri, as the Headquarters Company, 1st Battalion, 138th Infantry Regiment. It was redesignated on 1 May 1940 as the Headquarters Detachment, 1st Battalion, 138th Infantry and inducted into federal service on 23 December 1940. On 1 March 1942, the 138th Infantry was relieved from the 35th Infantry Division, and on 1 April 1942 the detachment was again redesignated as the Headquarters Company, 1st Battalion, 138th Infantry. The regiment was inactivated on 20 July 1944 at Camp Shelby, Mississippi.

On 20 June 1946, the 138th Infantry was reassigned to the 35th Infantry Division, and the 1st Battalion Headquarters Company was reorganized and federally recognized on 22 October 1946 at St. Louis. Subsequent reorganizations included conversion to the 101st Replacement Group in 1959, the Combat Command Section, 35th Command Headquarters in 1963, and finally consolidation with the 1135th Ordnance Company in 1968. On 15 January 1968, the consolidated unit was redesignated as the Headquarters and Headquarters Company, 35th Engineer Brigade.

The brigade received its Distinctive Unit Insignia in 1970 and retained the 35th Infantry Division–derived Shoulder Sleeve Insignia until 1984.

=== Training and State Missions ===
Throughout its history, the 35th Engineer Brigade has provided command and control of combat engineer units for both federal deployments and state emergency missions. The brigade regularly prepares Missouri Army National Guard engineer units for mobilization, supports State Emergency Duty (SED) during natural disasters, and can augment joint task forces across a range of military operations .

One notable state mission occurred in 2011, when the brigade mobilized in response to the EF-5 tornado in Joplin, Missouri, providing disaster response and security support during recovery operations .

The brigade has also overseen major training projects. In 2000, it was tasked with managing Operation Alaskan Road, an Innovative Readiness Training project that constructed a 14.8-mile, $33 million road across Annette Island, Alaska, linking the town of Metlakatla to the island’s north side .

=== Federal Deployments ===
The brigade headquarters deployed overseas during Operation Iraqi Freedom in 2005, where it supported the 20th Engineer Brigade with combat construction and engineer operations. It returned to Iraq in 2007–2008, operating in the Baghdad area under Multi-National Division–Baghdad, where missions included combat engineering, route clearance, and humanitarian projects .

In 2018–2019, the brigade deployed again, this time to Kuwait under Operation Spartan Shield, where it served as the engineer headquarters for Task Force Spartan, overseeing construction, infrastructure development, and force protection projects across the U.S. Central Command area of responsibility.

Most recently, in 2025, elements of the brigade participated in Beyond the Horizon, a multinational humanitarian and training exercise in Guatemala and Honduras, working with allied partners to provide engineering support and infrastructure development.
