= Frank J. Grass =

United States Army general (born 1951)

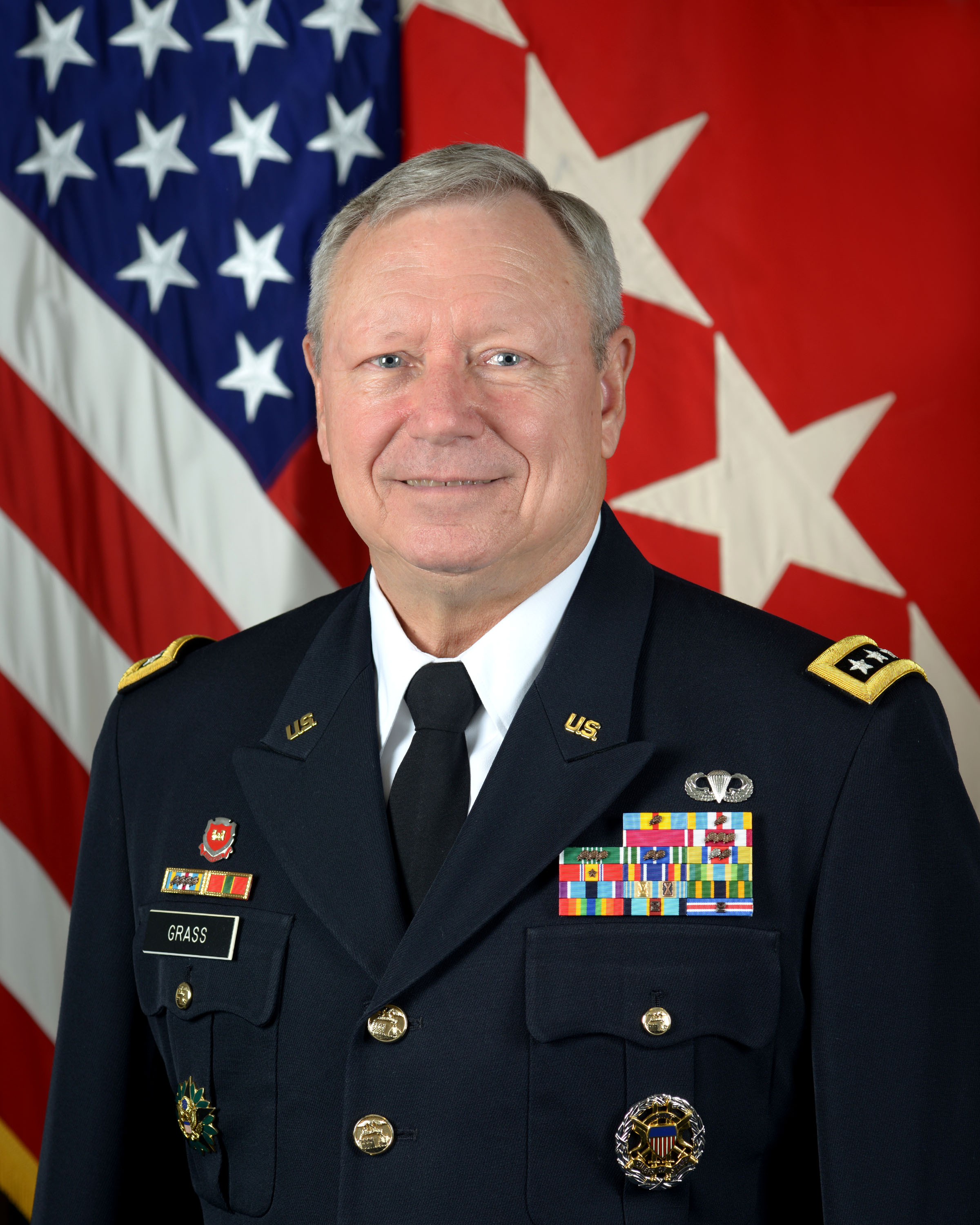
- Official portrait, 2016
- Born: 19 May 1951 (age 75); Arnold, Missouri, U.S.
- Military career
- Allegiance: United States
- Branch: United States Army: Missouri Army National Guard
- Service years: 1969–2016
- Rank: General
- Commands: 220th Engineer Company; 203rd Engineer Battalion; National Guard Bureau
- Conflicts: War on terrorism
- Awards: Defense Distinguished Service Medal (2); Defense Superior Service Medal (2); Legion of Merit

Frank J. Grass (born 19 May 1951) is a retired United States Army general who served as the 27th chief of the National Guard Bureau.

== Early life and education ==
A native of Arnold, Missouri, Grass was born on 19 May 1951, and graduated from Arnold's Fox High School in 1969. He joined the Missouri Army National Guard in October 1969, and served as an enlisted soldier and noncommissioned officer before graduating from Officer Candidate School in 1981 and receiving his commission as a second lieutenant in the Engineer Corps.

== Military career ==
While serving as a traditional member of the Army National Guard, Grass pursued a civilian career with the United States Army Corps of Engineers. Grass served in a variety of command and staff positions, first as a traditional Army Guardsman, and later as a member of the Active Guard and Reserve program and on active duty. His command assignments included the 220th Engineer Company (1986 to 1988) and the 203rd Engineer Battalion (1997 to 1999).

After becoming a general officer in 2004, Grass' assignments included: Deputy Director, Army National Guard (2004 to 2006); Director, Mobilization and Reserve Component Affairs, Headquarters, United States European Command (2006 to 2008); Director of Operations, United States Northern Command (2008 to 2010); and Deputy Commander, United States Northern Command (2010 to 2012).

In June 2012, Grass was nominated by President Barack Obama to serve as Chief of the National Guard Bureau, with appointment to the rank of general in the reserves of the army. The appointment and promotion were confirmed by the United States Senate on 26 July 2012. Grass formally took over the National Guard Bureau in a ceremony on 7 September 2012. In 2016, the Vice Chief of the National Guard Bureau, Joseph L. Lengyel, was nominated to succeed Grass. Lengyel was promoted to general and completed a transfer of authority ceremony with Grass on 3 August 2016.

== Education ==
- 1975, St. Louis Community College, Associate degree, Environmental Technology, St. Louis, Missouri
- 1985, Metropolitan State University, Bachelor of Science, Liberal Arts, St. Paul, Minnesota
- 1997, Southwest Missouri State University, Master of Science, Resource Planning, Springfield, Missouri
- 2000, National War College, Master of Science, National Security Strategy, Washington, D.C.
- 2006, National Defense University, CAPSTONE General and Flag Officer Course, Washington, D.C.

== Awards and decorations ==
- Parachutist Badge
- Joint Chiefs of Staff Identification Badge
- Army Staff Identification Badge
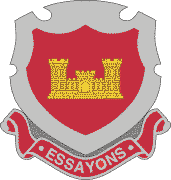
- United States Army Corps of Engineers DUI

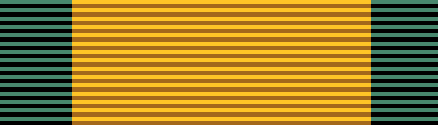
Defense Distinguished Service Medal (with 1 Bronze Oak Leaf Cluster)
Defense Superior Service Medal (with 1 Bronze Oak Leaf Cluster)
Legion of Merit
Meritorious Service Medal (with 3 Bronze Oak Leaf Clusters)
Army Commendation Medal (with 3 Bronze Oak Leaf Clusters)
Army Achievement Medal (with 2 Bronze Oak Leaf Clusters)
Joint Meritorious Unit Award (with 2 Bronze Oak Leaf Clusters)
Army Superior Unit Award
Army Reserve Component Achievement Medal (with 1 Silver Oak Leaf Cluster and 2 Bronze Oak Leaf Clusters)
National Defense Service Medal with 1 Bronze service star
Global War on Terrorism Service Medal
Armed Forces Service Medal
Humanitarian Service Medal
Armed Forces Reserve Medal with gold Hourglass device
Army NCO Professional Development Ribbon
Army Service Ribbon
Army Overseas Service Ribbon with Numeral 2
Army Reserve Components Overseas Training Ribbon with Numeral 2
Danish Home Guard Meritorious Service Medal
Missouri Conspicuous Service Medal, Missouri National Guard
Washington Army National Guard Legion of Merit, State of Washington

== Other achievements ==
- The Bronze Order of the de Fleury Medal, The Army Engineer Association
- Honorable Order of St. Barbara, United States Field Artillery Association
- Distinguished Service Medal, National Guard Association of the United States
- On 30 April 2015, General Grass was presented with the Meritorious Service Medal of the Danish Home Guard by DHG commander Major General Finn Winkler

== Chronological list of officer assignments ==
1. September 1981 – October 1981, Platoon Leader, Detachment 1, 220th Engineer Company, Festus, Missouri
2. October 1981 – February 1982, student, Engineer Officer Basic Course, Fort Belvoir, Virginia
3. February 1982 – January 1984, Project Officer, United States Army Corps of Engineers, St. Paul District, St. Paul, Minnesota
4. January 1984 – November 1984, Platoon Leader, Company D, 15th Engineer Battalion, 9th Infantry Division, Fort Lewis, Washington
5. November 1984 – May 1985, Executive Officer, Company D, 15th Engineer Battalion, 9th Infantry Division, Fort Lewis, Washington
6. May 1985 – January 1986, Battalion Motor Officer, 15th Engineer Battalion, 9th Infantry Division, Fort Lewis, Washington
7. January 1986 – February 1986, United States Army Reserve Control Group, Unassigned, St. Louis, Missouri
8. February 1986 – July 1986, S4, 880th Engineer Battalion, Jefferson Barracks, Missouri
9. July 1986 – July 1988, Commander, 220th Engineer Company, Festus, Missouri
10. July 1988 – July 1988, Civil Engineer, 35th Engineer Brigade, Jefferson Barracks, Missouri
11. July 1988 – July 1991, Assistant Professor of Military Science, Missouri State University, Springfield, Missouri
12. July 1991 – June 1992, Student, Command and General Staff Officer Course, Fort Leavenworth, Kansas
13. June 1992 – July 1994, Engineer Exercise Project Officer, Headquarters, United States Army South, Fort Clayton, Panama
14. July 1994 – July 1997, Chief, Exercise Section, Exercise Branch, Army National Guard Readiness Center, Arlington, Virginia
15. July 1997 – July 1999, Commander, 203rd Engineer Battalion, Joplin, Missouri
16. July 1999 – June 2000, student, National War College, National Defense University, Fort McNair, Washington, District of Columbia
17. June 2000 – September 2003, Chief, Operations Division, Army National Guard Readiness Center, Arlington, Virginia
18. September 2003 – April 2004, G-3, Army National Guard, Army National Guard Readiness Center, Arlington, Virginia
19. April 2004 – May 2006, deputy director, Army National Guard, Army National Guard Readiness Center, Arlington, Virginia
20. May 2006 – September 2008, Director, Mobilization and Reserve Component Affairs, Headquarters United States European Command, Stuttgart, Germany
21. September 2008 – September 2010, Director of Operations, United States Northern Command, Peterson Air Force Base, Colorado
22. September 2010 – September 2012, Deputy Commander, United States Northern Command, Peterson Air Force Base, Colorado
23. September 2012 – August 2016, Chief, National Guard Bureau, Arlington, Virginia

== Effective dates of promotions ==
Promotions
Insignia	Rank	Date
	Second Lieutenant	12 September 1981
	First Lieutenant	19 April 1983
	Captain	1 July 1985
	Major	4 August 1990
	Lieutenant Colonel	7 February 1995
	Colonel	31 May 2000
	Brigadier General	2 April 2004
	Major General	22 June 2006
	Lieutenant General	30 September 2010
	General	7 September 2012

Military offices
Preceded by H. Steven Blum	Deputy Commander of the United States Northern Command; 2010–2012	Succeeded by Michael Dubie
Preceded by Craig McKinley	Chief of the National Guard Bureau; 2012–2016	Succeeded by Joseph L. Lengyel
