= 35th Military Police Brigade =

35th Military Police Brigade (Combat Support)
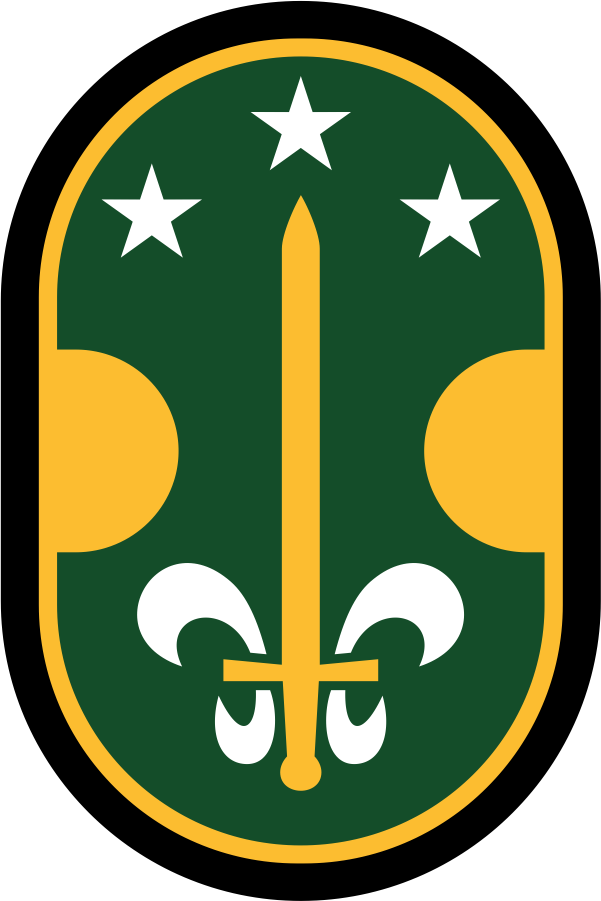
- Active: 2020 - present
- Country: United States
- Branch: United States Army National Guard
- Type: Military Police
- Size: Brigade
- Part of: Missouri National Guard
- Garrison/HQ: Jefferson Barracks Military Post, Missouri
- Motto: Defending Our Own
- Engagements: Operation Joint Guardian; Operation Enduring Freedom; Operation Iraqi Freedom; Operation New Dawn; Operation Spartan Shield; Operation Inherent Resolve

Commanders
- Current commander: Col. Lindsey Decker
- Command Sergeant Major: CSM James Brown

Insignia
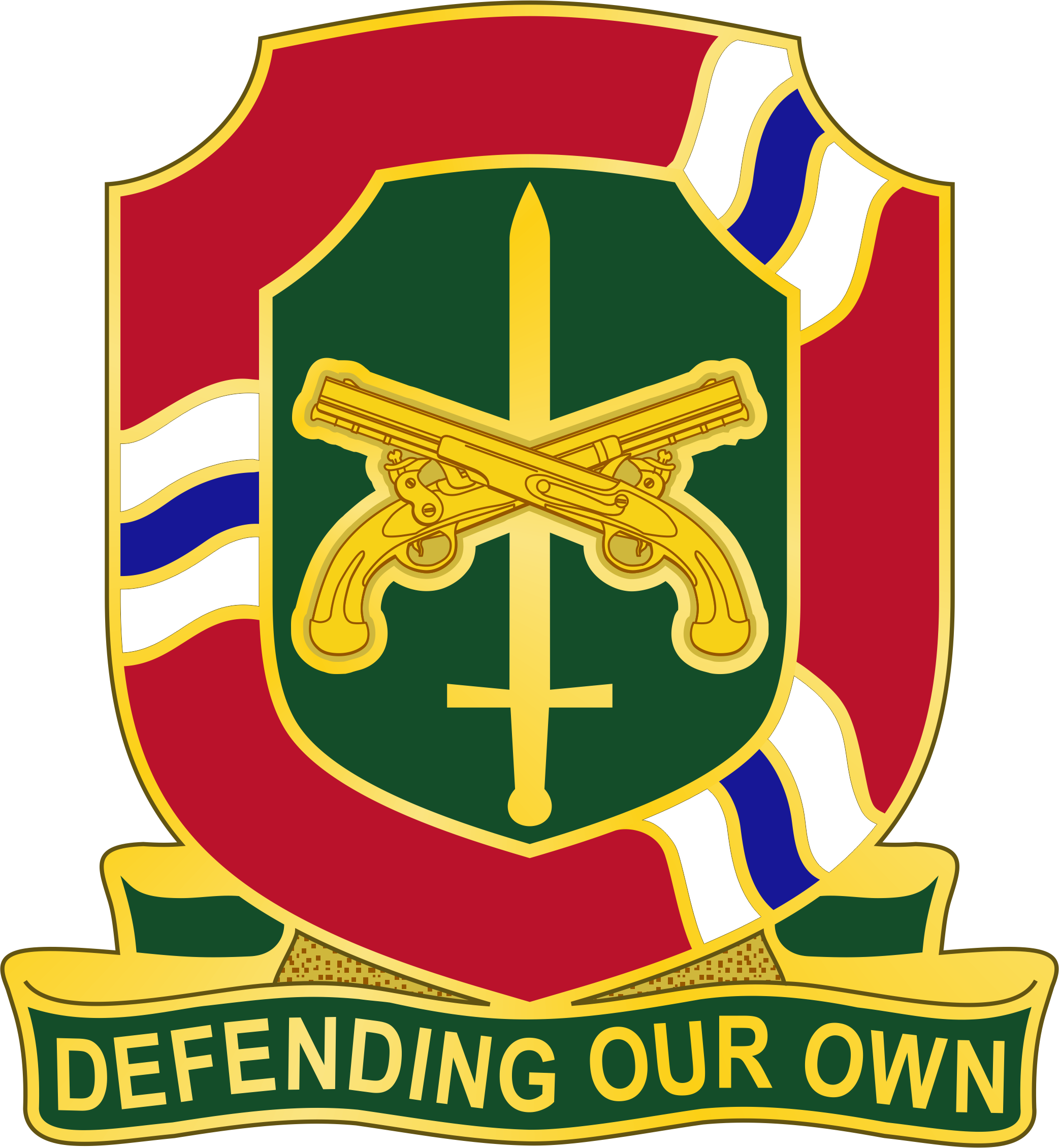
- 35th Military Police Brigade DUI

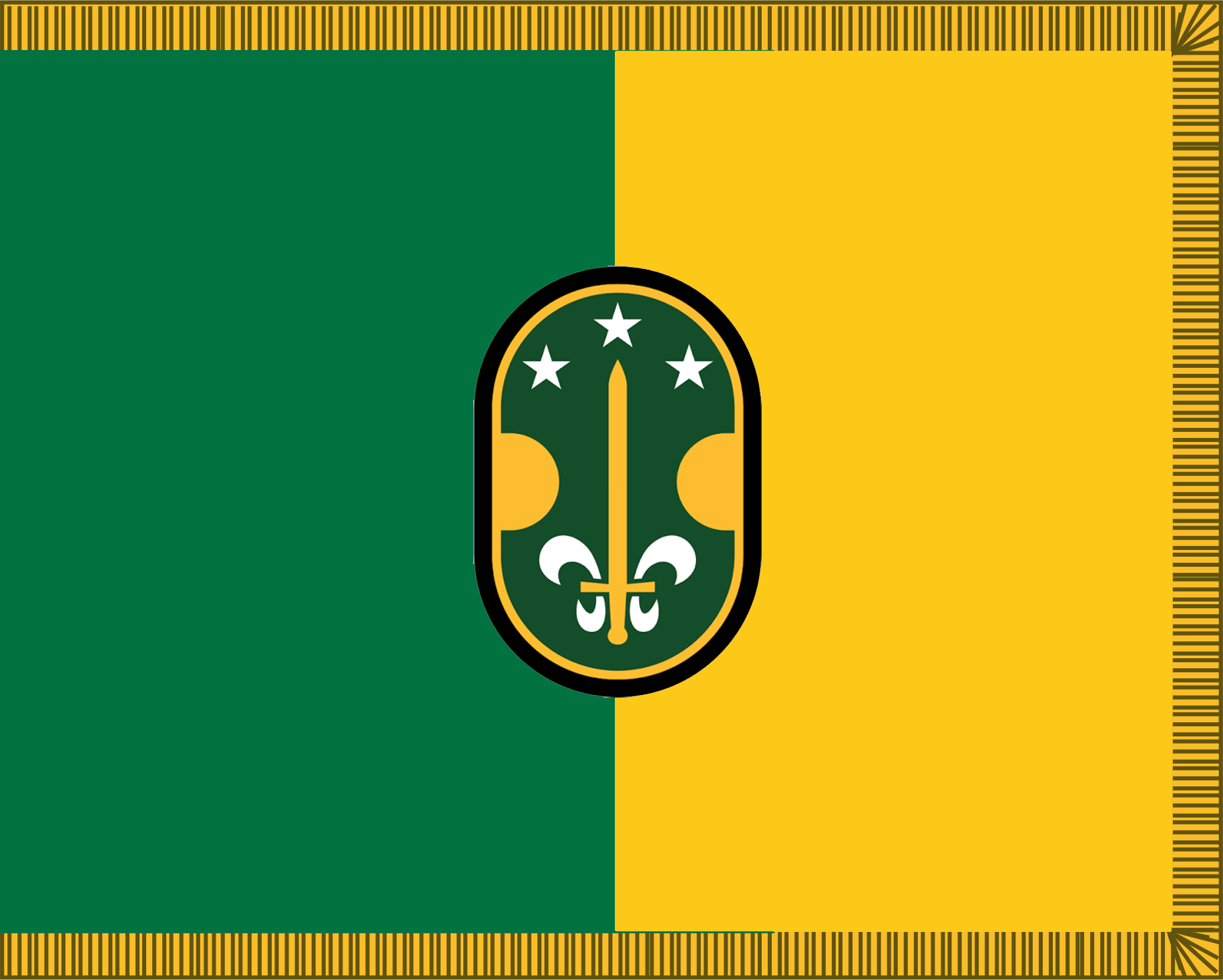
- 35th Military Police Brigade Flag

The 35th Military Police Brigade (Combat Support) is a unit of the Missouri Army National Guard, located at Jefferson Barracks, Missouri. Activated in September 2020, the brigade provides command and control of the state’s major military police formations, including the 175th and 205th Military Police Battalions.

With the formation as of 2020, this combines all Military Police Battalions of the Missouri Guard into one Combat Support Brigade.

== History ==
The 35th Military Police Brigade was activated in September 2020 at Jefferson Barracks, Missouri, as part of a larger restructuring within the Missouri Army National Guard. The new headquarters brought Missouri’s military police and transportation forces under a single command, including the 175th and 205th Military Police Battalions and the 220th Transportation Battalion.

Although the brigade itself is relatively new, its subordinate units have long records of service overseas and at home.

Missouri’s military police battalions were heavily involved in the Global War on Terrorism. Companies from the 175th and 205th MP Battalions deployed multiple times to Iraq and Afghanistan, where they provided convoy security, detainee operations, police training, and force protection.

Missouri MPs also deployed to Kosovo in the early 2000s as part of NATO’s KFOR mission, conducting peacekeeping and security patrols. These operations are considered part of the lineage of today’s 35th MP Brigade.

At the state level, Missouri MPs have been called on regularly for disaster response and civil support missions. Soldiers were mobilized during the Great Flood of 1993 and have returned for subsequent Missouri River floods in 2007, 2011, 2017, and 2019, assisting with traffic control, levee security, and relief operations.

MP units were also activated in 2014 during the Ferguson unrest, where they provided security support to law enforcement.

Most recently, during the COVID-19 pandemic (2020–2021), Missouri MPs helped operate testing and vaccination sites, secured medical facilities, and provided logistics and transportation support.

== Organization ==
- 35th Military Police Brigade, at Jefferson Barracks
  - Headquarters and Headquarters Company, 35th Military Police Brigade, at Jefferson Barracks
  - 175th Military Police Battalion, in Columbia
    - Headquarters and Headquarters Detachment, 175th Military Police Battalion, in Columbia
    - 1139th Military Police Company (Combat Support), in Kansas City
    - 3175th Military Police Company (Combat Support), in Warrenton
      - Detachment 1, 3175th Military Police Company (Combat Support), in Hannibal
  - 205th Military Police Battalion, in Poplar Bluff
    - Headquarters and Headquarters Detachment, 205th Military Police Battalion, in Poplar Bluff
    - 1136th Military Police Company (Combat Support), in Springfield
      - Detachment 1, 1136th Military Police Company (Combat Support), in Rolla
    - 1137th Military Police Company (Combat Support), in Kennett
      - Detachment 1, 1137th Military Police Company (Combat Support), in Jackson
    - 1175th Military Police Company (Combat Support), in St. Clair
  - 220th Transportation Battalion (Motor), in Fredericktown
    - Headquarters and Headquarters Detachment, 220th Transportation Battalion (Motor), in Fredericktown
    - 548th Transportation Company (Medium Truck) (PLS), in Trenton
      - Detachment 1, 548th Transportation Company (Medium Truck) (PLS), in Lexington
    - 1231st Transportation Company (Light-Medium Truck), in Bridgeton
      - Detachment 1, 1231st Transportation Company (Light-Medium Truck), in Columbia
    - 1241st Transportation Company (Medium Truck) (Cargo), in Monett
      - Detachment 1, 1241st Transportation Company (Medium Truck) (Cargo), in Anderson
    - 1251st Transportation Company (Medium Truck) (Cargo), in Harrisonville
      - Detachment 1, 1251st Transportation Company (Medium Truck) (Cargo), in Nevada

== Commanders ==
- Col. Rodney Ginter
- Col. Joy Grimes
- Col. Lindsey Decker
- Col. Andy Haap

== Command Sergeant's Major ==
- CSM Donald Hubbard
- CSM Bobby Richards
- CSM James Brown
