= 6th Missouri Infantry Regiment =

6th Missouri Infantry can refer to:

- 6th Missouri Infantry Regiment (Confederate), a Confederate regiment during the American Civil War
- 6th Missouri Infantry Regiment (Union), a Union regiment during the American Civil War
- 6th Missouri Volunteer Infantry Regiment (1898), a regiment formed during the Spanish-American War

== See also ==
- 6th Missouri Cavalry Regiment
