= 1138th Military Police Company =

- Active: 1 January 1968 – 2019
- Country: United States
- Branch: United States Army
- Role: Enemy Prisoner of War
- Part of: Army National Guard
- Garrison/HQ: West Plains, Missouri; Springfield, Missouri
- Engagements: Operation Just Cause; Operation Desert Storm; Operation Noble Eagle; Operation Enduring Freedom; Operation Iraqi Freedom; Hurricane Katrina

The 1138th Military Police Company (MP Co) was a military police company of the Missouri Army National Guard. It was federally recognized in January 1968. The company headquarters was located at West Plains, Missouri and a detachment was located at Springfield, Missouri. Since federal recognition, the company was activated in Panama and deployed to the Middle East to support combat actions and has also performed humanitarian and security missions within the United States.

== History ==
The 1138th Military Police Company (MP Co) was federally recognized and assigned to West Plains, Missouri with a detachment in Doniphan, Missouri on 15 January 1968. Company headquarters, one platoon, and the machine gun section were located at West Plains and the detachment at Doniphan was made up of the remaining two platoons.

On 1 July 1993 the platoons at Doniphan were realigned to the 735th Support Battalion at Poplar Bluff, Missouri. The 1138th then added a detachment at Springfield, Missouri. Although it was planned to move the 1135th MP Co to West Plains to replace the 1138th in connection with this reorganization, the plan was cancelled and the West Plains company kept its 1138th number. On 1 October 1996, a second detachment of the company was assigned at Mountain Grove, Missouri. In 1998 the Mountain Grove detachment was inactivated.

The 1138th MP Co was reorganized as a combat support military police company on 1 October 1996. On 1 October 1998, the 1138th MP CO was once again organized as an Enemy Prisoner of War (EPW) Company; the only EPW Company in the state of Missouri.

=== Support for civilian emergencies ===
On 20 June 1993 the company was mobilized for state emergency (Flood) duty. While mobilized, the unit served in northeast Missouri for approximately three months maintaining law and order.

After the attacks of 11 September 2001, the 1138th was mobilized as part of Operation Noble Eagle, a military operation providing military support for increased security at potential terrorist targets. The company served on active duty from 1 October 2001 through 21 September 2002, performing law and order duties at Fort Leonard Wood, Missouri.

On 31 August 2005, the company deployed with the 175th MP Bn to Jefferson Parish, Louisiana to support relief operations after Hurricane Katrina. While deployed in Louisiana, the 1138th performed law and order operations and area security missions, returning on 21 September 2005.

In 2009, while preparing for yet another active duty deployment to Iraq, the Ozarks region of rural Missouri was hit by a harsh wave of winter weather and in January, the unit deployed a contingent to aid winter storm victims in Southeast Missouri for Operation January Ice.

=== Combat support deployments ===
In December, 1989, the company was called into active service for Operation Just Cause (Panama). It was the first Army National Guard unit to be activated since the Vietnam War. As part of its traditional internment and resettlement mission, the 1138th established a detainee camp at Empire Range, Panama where it handled both civilian and military detainees.

On 15 November 1990, the unit was mobilized and deployed to Saudi Arabia during Operation Desert Storm. It remained in Saudi Arabia for five months guarding prisoners of war.

The 1138th deployed for Operation Enduring Freedom and Operation Iraqi Freedom, serving on active duty from 10 February 2003 through 21 December 2003. Upon arrival in the Middle East, the unit conducted customs, physical security, and law and order missions throughout Kuwait and in Doha, Qatar.

After Operation January Ice concluded in 2009, the company began its preparation for a detainee operations mission in Baghdad, Iraq. While preparing for deployment, nearly fifty 1138th soldiers were transferred to the 1140th MP Co, another Missouri Army National Guard unit preparing to deploy to Afghanistan. The 1138th backfilled its ranks with "In-Lieu-Of" military policemen from twenty-three other Missouri Army National Guard units. On 21 May 2009, the unit reported to Camp Clark, Missouri for pre-mobilization training. The unit then reported for post-mobilization Training at Fort Bliss, Texas and after completing a twenty-day-long mission evaluation exercise, deployed to Iraq, to support Operation Iraqi Freedom 09-10.

The 1138th Military Police Company at West Plains was inactivated in January 2019 and replaced by the 1142nd Engineer Company of the 1140th Engineer Battalion, activated in September of that year.

== Assignments ==
- 204th Military Police Battalion: 15 January 1968
- 205th Military Police Battalion: 1 March 1969
- 204th Military Police Battalion: 1 March 1973
- 205th Military Police Battalion: 30 September 1986
- 175th Military Police Battalion: 1 August 1995 – Present.
