= Richard D. Dean =

United States Army general (1929–2016)

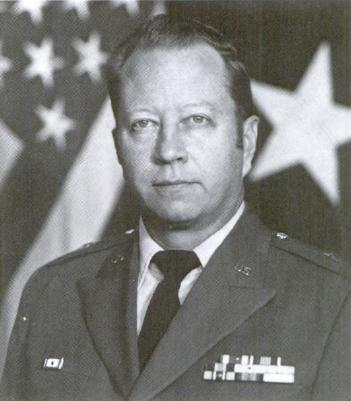
- Brigadier General Dean as Deputy Director, Army National Guard, 1985
- Born: May 27, 1929; Sedalia, Missouri, U.S.
- Died: April 8, 2016 (aged 86); Sedalia, Missouri, U.S.
- Military career
- Allegiance: United States
- Branch: United States Army
- Service years: 1948–1987
- Rank: Brigadier General
- Nickname: Dick
- Units: Missouri Army National Guard; Army National Guard
- Commands: Battery C, 1st Battalion, 128th Field Artillery; Headquarters Battery, 2nd Battalion, 128th Field Artillery; 1st Battalion, 128th Field Artillery; 135th Field Artillery Group; 35th Engineer Brigade
- Conflicts: Korean War
- Awards: Meritorious Service Medal; Army Commendation Medal
- Other work: Owner, construction company

Richard Daniel Dean (May 27, 1929 – April 8, 2016) was a United States Army brigadier general who served as deputy director of the Army National Guard.

== Early life ==
Richard Daniel Dean was born in Sedalia, Missouri, on May 27, 1929.

Dean joined the Missouri Army National Guard’s 175th Military Police Battalion in 1948. Dean completed the Reserve Officer Training Corps program at the University of Missouri in 1952, and received a Bachelor of Science degree in civil engineering and business.

Dean became the owner and operator of a construction company in Sedalia.

== Korean War ==
Commissioned a second lieutenant of Field Artillery, after completing his initial training Dean served in the Korean War. Assigned to the 160th Field Artillery, a unit of the 45th Infantry Division, Dean served in Battery C as a Forward Observer, and later in a staff assignment as Assistant Troop Information and Education Officer. He was released from active duty in March 1954.

== Post-Korean War ==
Dean rejoined the Missouri Army National Guard, and advanced through command and staff assignments of increasing rank and responsibility. He commanded Battery C, 1st Battalion, 128th Field Artillery and Headquarters Battery, 2nd Battalion, 128th Field Artillery in the 1950s. He later commanded the 1st Battalion, 128th Field Artillery.

== Later career ==
In 1975, Dean was assigned as commander of the 135th Field Artillery Group.

In 1979, he was appointed to command the 35th Engineer Brigade.

Dean was appointed deputy director of the Army National Guard in 1983 and promoted to brigadier general. He served in this position until his retirement in 1987.

== Military education ==
Dean was a graduate of the United States Army Command and General Staff College and the National War College.

== Post-military activities ==
After retiring, Dean resided in Arlington, Virginia and Sedalia.

In 2009, Dean was one of the signers of a letter to President Barack Obama, in which more than 400 retired generals and admirals asked that the 1993 Don't ask, don't tell policy on homosexuality among members of the military be kept in place.

Dean died in Sedalia, Missouri on April 8, 2016, at the age of 86.

== Awards ==
Dean's awards included:

- Meritorious Service Medal
- Army Commendation Medal
- National Defense Service Medal
- Korean Service Medal with Service star
- Armed Forces Reserve Medal with gold hourglass
- Army Reserve Component Achievement Medal with oak leaf cluster
- Army Service Ribbon
- United Nations Service Medal
- Republic of Korea Presidential Unit Citation
- Missouri Conspicuous Service Medal
- Missouri Commendation Ribbon
- Missouri Long Service Ribbon
- Missouri State Emergency Duty Ribbon
