= Joseph L. Lengyel =

US Air Force general

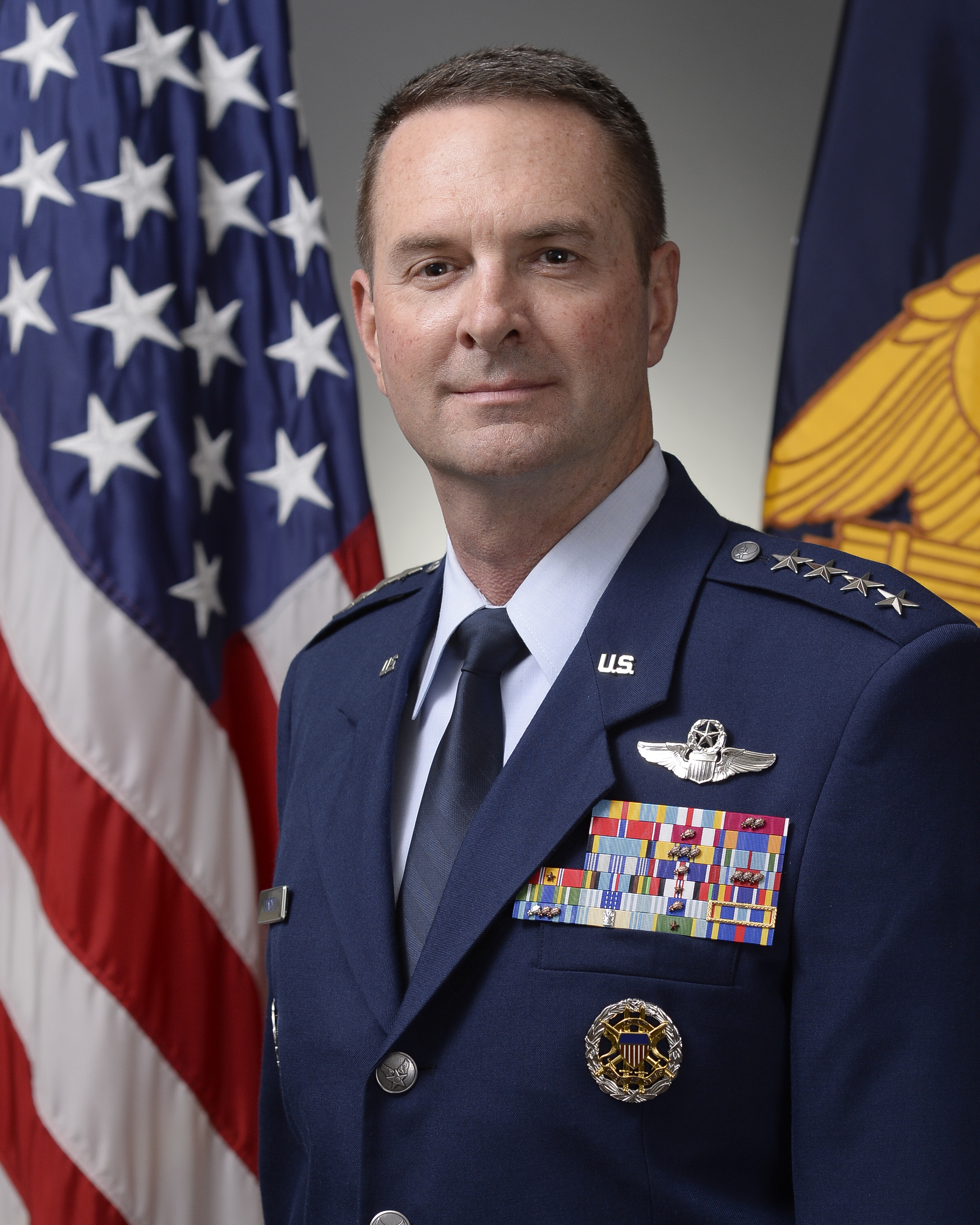
- Official portrait, 2016
- Born: 1959 (age 66–67); Northeastern United States
- Military career
- Allegiance: United States
- Branch: United States Air Force; Air National Guard
- Service years: 1981–2020
- Rank: General
- Commands: National Guard Bureau; Air National Guard Readiness Center; 455th Expeditionary Operations Group; 149th Operations Group; 182d Fighter Squadron
- Conflicts: War in Afghanistan
- Awards: Defense Distinguished Service Medal; Defense Superior Service Medal; Legion of Merit (3); Bronze Star Medal

Joseph Lauren Lengyel (born 1959) is a retired United States Air Force four-star general who last served as the 28th chief of the National Guard Bureau from August 2016 to August 2020. As chief, he was responsible for ensuring that nearly 460,000 Army National Guard and Air National Guard personnel are accessible, capable and ready to protect the homeland and to provide combat capabilities to the United States Army and the United States Air Force. Lengyel is a command pilot with more than 3,000 flying hours primarily in the F-16.

Prior to his last assignment, Lengyel served as the 10th vice chief of the National Guard Bureau. His previous general officer assignments include Senior United States Defense Official; Chief, Office of Military Cooperation; and Defense Attaché, Cairo, United States Central Command, Cairo, Egypt. He retired from the Air Force on August 3, 2020, after over 38 years of service.

== Early life ==
Joseph Lauren Lengyel is the son of Lauren and Margaret Lengyel. His father was a career Air Force officer and Vietnam War veteran who was held as a prisoner of war; he received the Silver Star and retired a lieutenant colonel. Lengyel has two brothers and a sister; one of his brothers, Gregory J. Lengyel, is a retired major general and was a career Air Force special operations officer. Lengyel was commissioned into the United States Air Force in 1981 through the Air Force Reserve Officer Training Corps program at North Texas State University.

== Military career ==
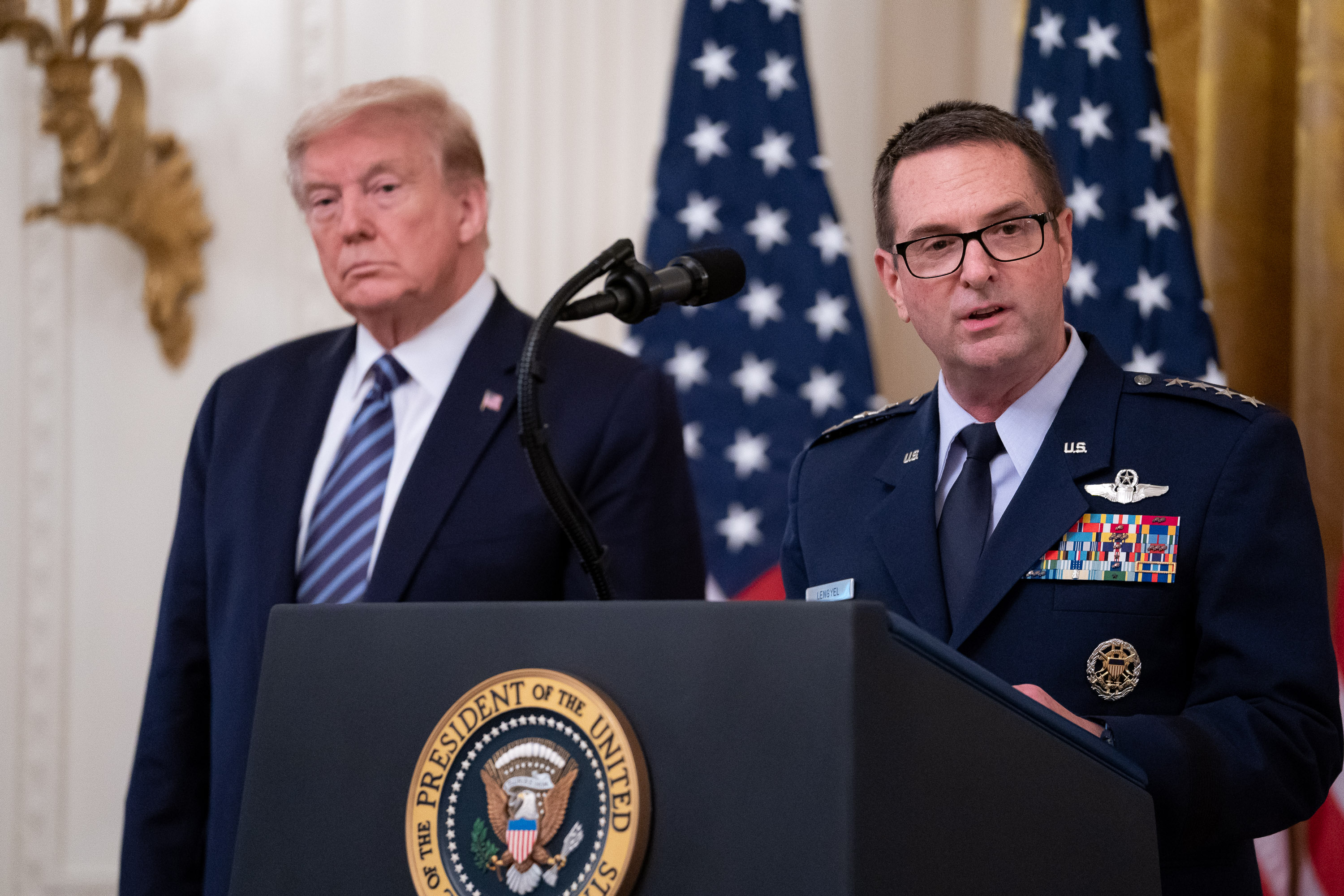
General Lengyel speaks at an event at the White House in April 2020.

Lengyel served in various operational and staff assignments, primarily as an Instructor Pilot and unit Weapons Officer in the F-16 Fighting Falcon. His experience in the F-16 includes tours in Tactical Air Command, Air Combat Command, Pacific Air Forces, United States Air Forces in Europe and the Texas Air National Guard. He has commanded a fighter squadron, operations group, air expeditionary group and the Air National Guard Readiness Center.

== Education ==
1981 Bachelor's degree in chemistry, University of North Texas
1984 Squadron Officer School, Maxwell AFB, Alabama
1988 Air Force Fighter Weapons Instructor Course, Nellis AFB, Nevada
1994 Air Command and Staff College, by seminar
2001 Air War College, by correspondence
2008 National Security Management Course, Maxwell School of Citizenship and Public Affairs, Syracuse University, N.Y.
2009 Capstone General and Flag Officer Course, National Defense University, Fort Lesley J. McNair, Washington, D.C.
2010 Combined Force Air Component Commander Course, Maxwell AFB, Alabama
2010 Harvard John F. Kennedy School of Government, Program for Senior Executives in National and International Security, Cambridge, Mass.
2011 University of Tennessee, Master of Business Administration

== Assignments ==
1. March 1982 – March 1983, Student, undergraduate pilot training, 47th Flying Training Wing, Laughlin AFB, Texas
2. March 1983 – May 1983, Student, fighter lead-in training, 479th Tactical Training Wing, Holloman AFB, New Mexico
3. May 1983 – January 1984, Student, F-16 upgrade training, 56th Tactical Training Wing, MacDill AFB, Florida.
4. January 1984 – April 1986, Instructor Pilot, 474th Tactical Fighter Wing, Nellis AFB, Nevada
5. April 1986 – April 1987, Instructor Pilot Flight Examiner, 8th Tactical Fighter Wing, Kunsan Air Base, South Korea
6. April 1987 – June 1987, F-16C conversion training, 405th Tactical Training Wing, Luke AFB, Arizona
7. June 1987 – September 1991, Instructor Pilot, and Chief of Weapons, 512th Tactical Fighter Squadron, Ramstein Air Base, Germany
8. September 1991 – September 1995, Instructor Pilot Flight Examiner and Weapons Officer, 182nd Fighter Squadron, Texas Air National Guard, Kelly AFB, Texas
9. September 1996 – June 1997, Commander, 149th Operations Support Flight, 149th Operations Group, Kelly AFB, Texas
10. June 1997 – October 1998, Operations Officer, 182nd Fighter Squadron, Kelly AFB, Texas
11. October 1998 – October 1999, Commander, 182nd Fighter Squadron, Kelly AFB, Texas
12. October 1999 – February 2002, Commander, 149th Operations Group, Lackland AFB / Kelly Field Annex, Texas
13. February 2002 – June 2004, Vice Commander, 149th Fighter Wing, Lackland AFB, Texas
14. June 2004 – September 2004, Commander, 455th Expeditionary Operations Group, Bagram Air Base, Afghanistan
15. September 2004 – September 2006, Air National Guard Advisor to Commander, United States Air Force in Europe
16. September 2006 – September 2008, Commander, Air National Guard Readiness Center, Andrews AFB, Maryland
17. September 2008 – June, 2009, Deputy Director, Air National Guard, Arlington, Virginia, and Commander, Air National Guard Readiness Center, Andrews AFB, Md.
18. June 2009 – July 2010, Military Assistant Deputy Chief of Staff for Strategic Plans and Programs, Headquarters U.S. Air Force, Washington, D.C.
19. July 2010 – June 2011, Vice Commander, 1st Air Force (Air Forces Northern), Tyndall AFB, Florida
20. June 2011 – August 2012, Senior U.S. Defense Official; Chief, Office of Military Cooperation and Defense Attaché, Cairo, U.S. Central Command, Cairo, Egypt
21. August 2012 – August 2016, Vice Chief, National Guard Bureau, Washington, D.C.
22. August 2016 – August 2020, Chief, National Guard Bureau, Washington, D.C.

== Flight information ==
Rating: Command Pilot
Flight hours: more than 3,000
Aircraft flown: T-37, T-38 and F-16

== Awards and decorations ==
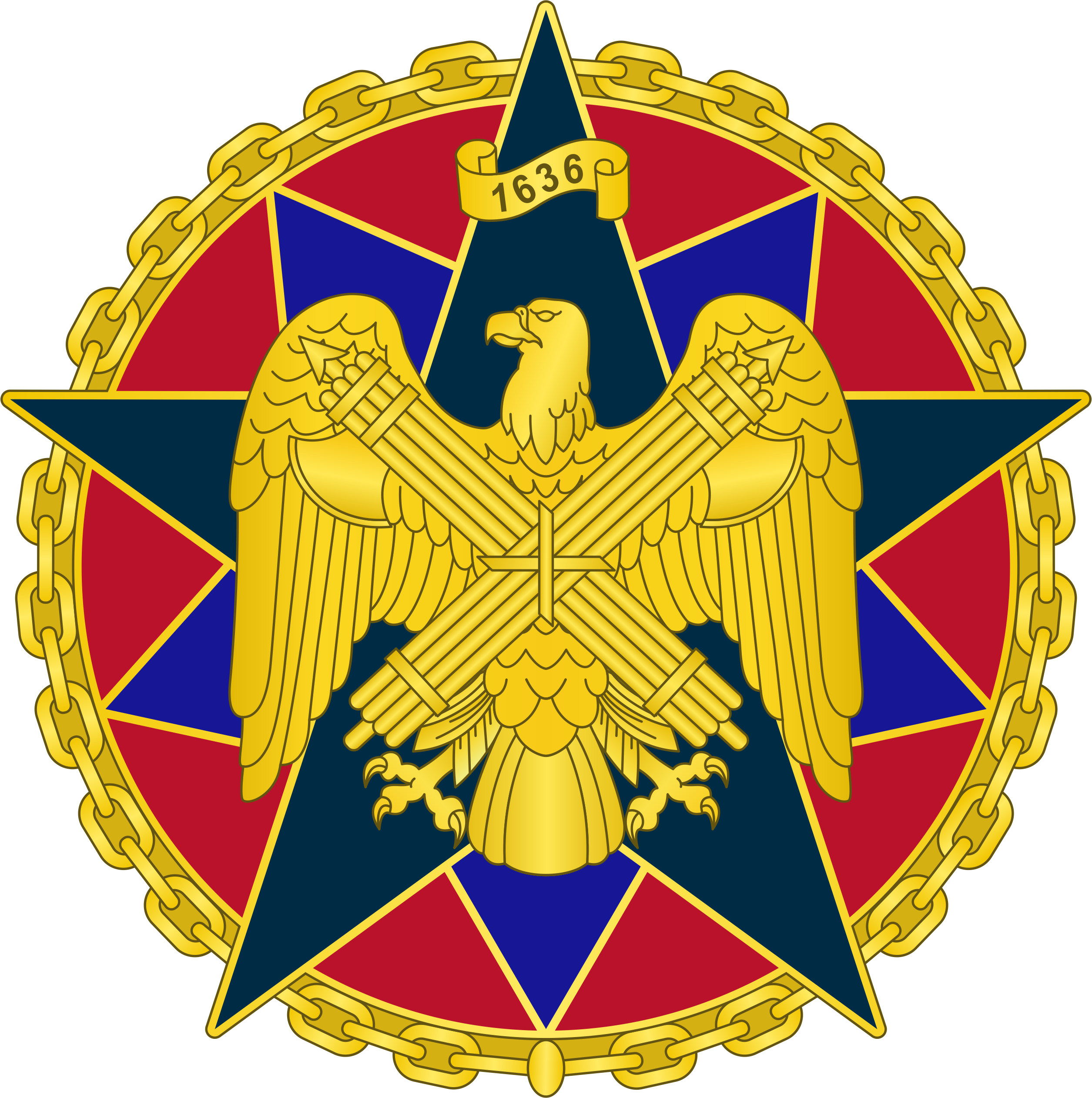
US Air Force Command Pilot Badge
Office of the Joint Chiefs of Staff Identification Badge
National Guard Bureau Organizational Badge

Defense Distinguished Service Medal
Defense Superior Service Medal
Legion of Merit with two bronze oak leaf clusters
Bronze Star Medal
Meritorious Service Medal with one bronze oak leaf cluster
Air Medal
Aerial Achievement Medal
Air Force Commendation Medal with three bronze oak leaf clusters
Joint Service Achievement Medal
Air Force Achievement Medal
Joint Meritorious Unit Award
Air Force Outstanding Unit Award with one bronze oak leaf cluster
Combat Readiness Medal with three bronze oak leaf clusters
National Defense Service Medal with one bronze service star
Armed Forces Expeditionary Medal
Afghanistan Campaign Medal with one bronze service star
Global War on Terrorism Service Medal
Korea Defense Service Medal
Air Force Overseas Short Tour Service Ribbon
Air Force Overseas Long Tour Service Ribbon with one bronze oak leaf cluster
Air Force Expeditionary Service Ribbon with gold frame
Air Force Longevity Service Award with one silver and three bronze oak leaf clusters
Armed Forces Reserve Medal with silver Hourglass device
Small Arms Expert Marksmanship Ribbon with one bronze service star
Air Force Training Ribbon

=== Other achievements ===
1983 Distinguished graduate, undergraduate pilot training
2009 Maj. Gen. I.G. Brown Command Excellence Award
Multiple civilian pilot ratings, including Airline Transport Pilot

== Effective dates of promotion ==
Second Lieutenant Dec. 21, 1981
First Lieutenant Dec. 21, 1983
Captain Dec. 21, 1985
Major Dec. 13, 1994
Lieutenant Colonel Dec. 23, 1998
Colonel Sept. 18, 2002
Brigadier General Sept. 26, 2008
Major General April 1, 2011
Lieutenant General Aug. 18, 2012
General Aug. 3, 2016

Military offices
Preceded by Frank J. Grass	Chief of the National Guard Bureau; 2016–2020	Succeeded by Daniel R. Hokanson
