= Camp Clark, Missouri =

Coordinates: 37°49′13″N 94°17′29″W

Camp Clark, Missouri is a Missouri Army National Guard training facility located east of Nevada, Missouri covering 1300 acres. It is named for Harvey C. Clark, who would later serve as the state's Adjutant General.

== History ==
Camp Clark was established in 1908 as the State Rifle Range. It served as a muster point for soldiers who were deploying to Central America and during the Mexican Border War. It later served as a training site for more than 10,000 Missouri National Guard soldiers in World War I. The Library of Congress maintains an image of the camp from 1917.

The facility was converted into a Prisoner-of-war camp in 1942 for captured prisoners of war (POWs) from Italy in World War II. The first train bringing prisoners derailed, killing several of them and some United States Army soldiers. The prison camp was built by the POWs who survived. German POWs were also sent to the camp before the end of the war.

A number of former prisoners returned to visit the facility in the 1990s.

== Missouri National Guard ==
The Missouri National Guard has operated the site as a training facility since at least 1994, when regulations for public access were promulgated by the Missouri Department of Public Safety, and it is used as a pre-deployment training site. The site is listed as a current training facility and the location of Field Maintenance Shop 15 on an unclassified map published by the Missouri National Guard in 2024. The camp also hosts an Army Heliport with the FAA identifier code 35MO, which is closed to public use.

In 2013, more than 60 buildings built in the 1920s were demolished to make way for new structures. At that time, Camp Clark had 456 beds. It boasts a pool, urban training site, six rifle ranges, and a pistol range. Bowhunting is authorized for turkey and white-tailed deer with permission.
