= 203rd Engineer Battalion (United States) =

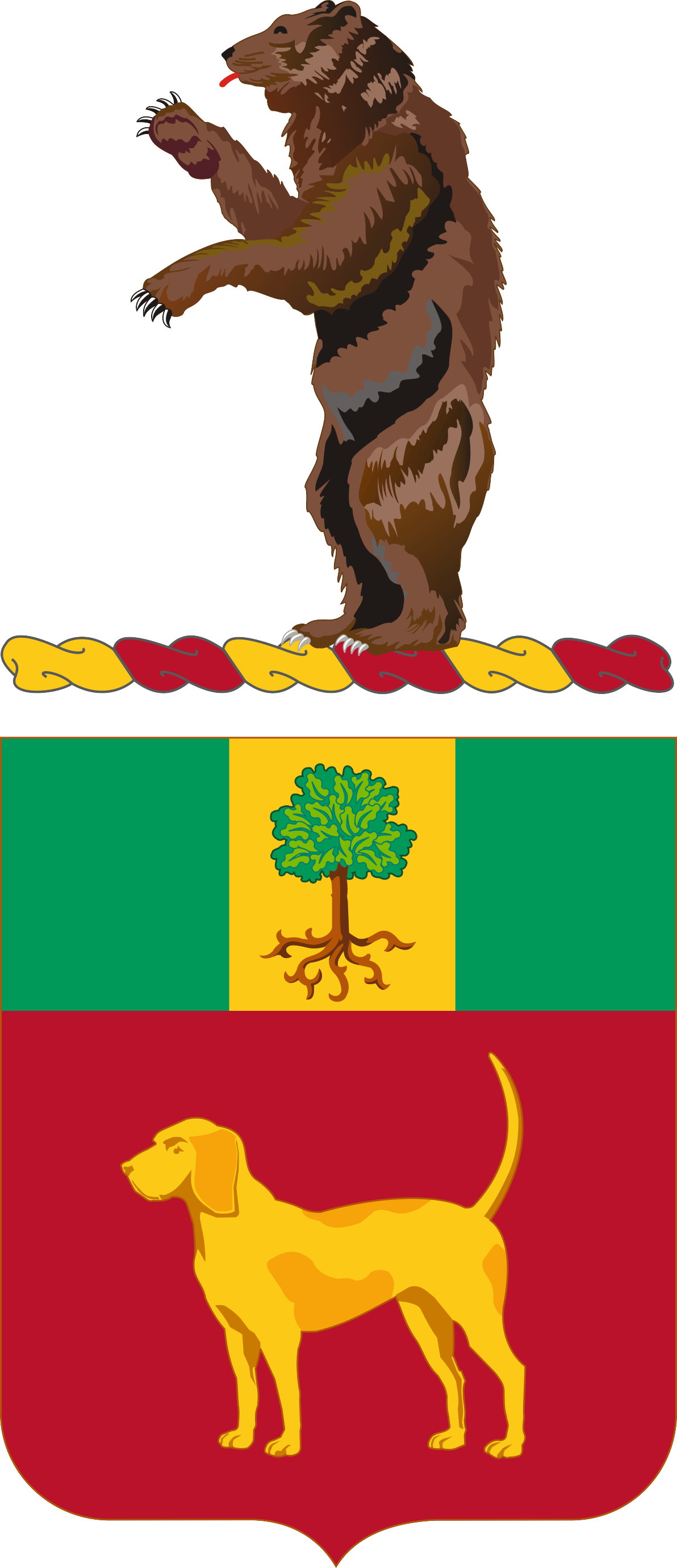
- Coat of arms
- Active: 1921
- Country: United States
- Branch: Missouri Army National Guard
- Type: Combat engineer
- Size: Regiment
- Motto: "Don't Kick Our Dog"
- March: Ya Gotta Quit Kickin My Dog Aroun

Commanders
- Commander: LTC Charles Ledgerwood

Insignia
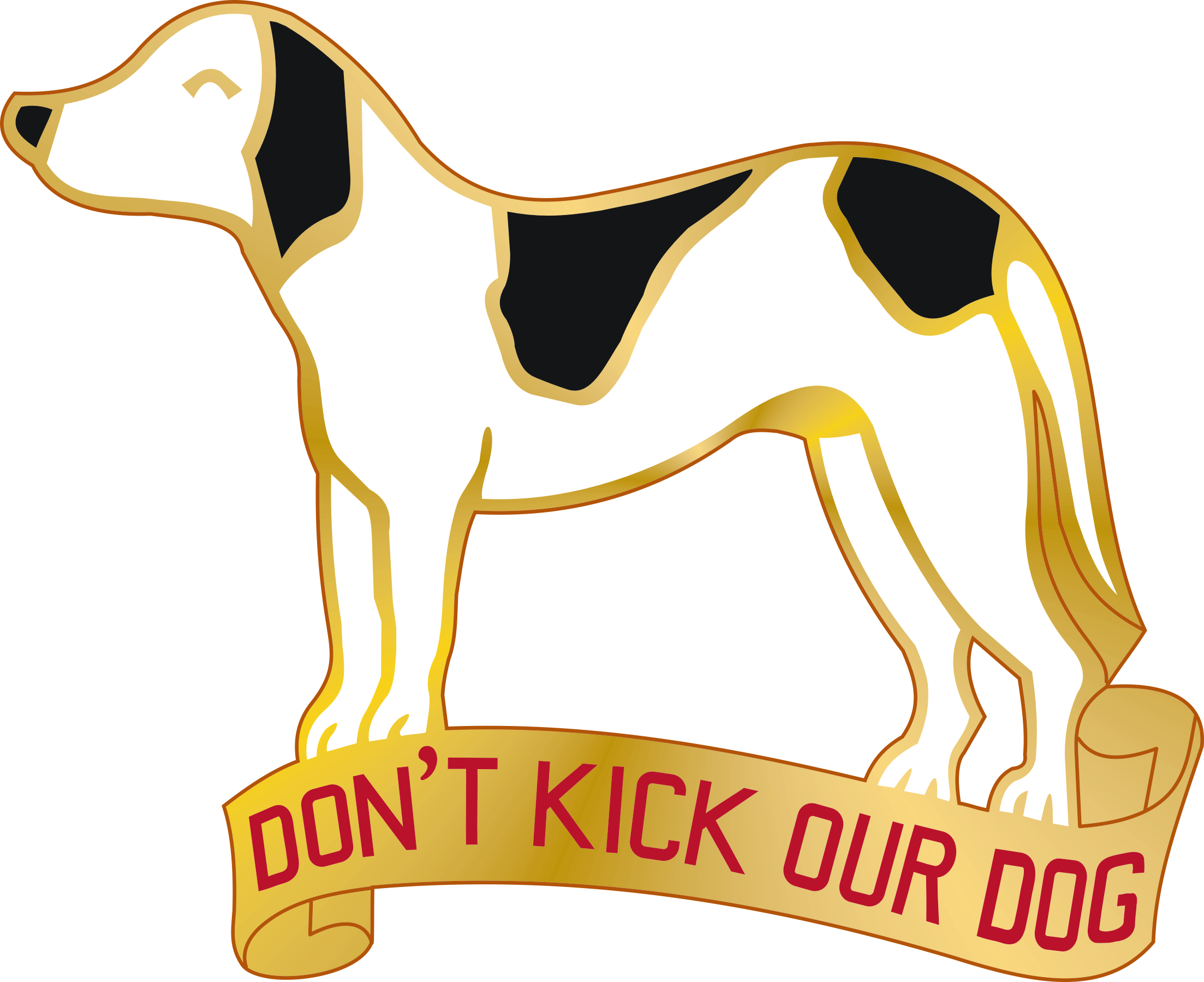
- Distinctive unit insignia (left)

The 203rd Engineer Battalion is a combat engineer battalion of the Missouri Army National Guard.

The 203rd Engineer Battalion can trace its history back to Missouri volunteer militia units that formed in 1883, when the militia units in southwest Missouri were reorganized into the 2nd Infantry Regiment of the National Guard of Missouri in 1890 and mustered into federal service during the Spanish–American War. The 2nd Missouri Infantry was called up to serve during the Mexican border dispute in 1916; redesignated as the 128th, 129th, and 130th Machine Gun Battalions in 1917; transformed into the 203rd Artillery, Coast Artillery Corps in 1921; inducted into federal service in September 1940; and was later sent to Alaska for the Aleutian Campaign.

== History and lineage ==
The 203rd Coast Artillery was originally organized as the 2nd Infantry Regiment, Missouri National Guard, on 15 October 1890. Some of the companies of this regiment claimed descent from companies of the earlier 5th Missouri Infantry Regiment, organized on 26 November 1883 from companies originally formed as far back as 1876, and disbanded on 19 April 1887. On 12 May 1898, the 2nd Missouri Infantry was mustered into federal service for the Spanish–American War and was mustered out from 27 February – 3 May 1899. The 2nd Missouri was reorganized in the Missouri National Guard in June 1899. It was mustered into service on the Mexican border on 28 June 1916, and was mustered out on 17 January 1917. On 5 August 1917, the regiment was drafted into federal service after American entry into World War I. National Guard units were formed into divisions, and the 2nd Missouri Infantry became part of the 35th Division, its elements being used to form different units. The Supply Company and Headquarters Company (less Band) formed the 110th Trench Mortar Battery. The 1st Battalion and the Machine Gun Company formed the 128th Machine Gun Battalion, the 2nd Battalion formed the 129th Machine Gun Battalion, and the 3rd Battalion formed the 130th Machine Gun Battalion. The Band was assigned to the 311th Cavalry Regiment. The 35th Division served overseas in France in the Meuse-Argonne, Alsace, and Lorraine Campaigns, and the former 2nd Missouri Infantry was mustered out of service in May 1919. The 2nd Artillery (Antiaircraft) was constituted in the Missouri National Guard on 28 April 1921 as from new and existing units as follows:

- HHB from new
- HHB 1st Battalion from new
- Battery A from Company B, 128th Machine Gun Battalion
- Battery B from Company B, 129th Machine Gun Battalion
- Battery C from new
- Battery D from Company B, 140th Infantry Regiment
- HHB 2nd Battalion from new
- Battery E from new
- Battery F from Company B, 130th Machine Gun Battalion
- Battery G from Company A, 130th Machine Gun Battalion

The regimental headquarters was organized and federally recognized on 2 June 1921 at Aurora, Missouri. On 1 October 1921, the regiment was redesignated as the 203rd Artillery Regiment (Antiaircraft), Coast Artillery Corps, and assigned to the VII Corps. From 9 July to 5 August 1922, the 1st and 2nd Battalions performed riot control during a coal miners' strike at Moberly and Macon, Missouri. On 19 April 1924, the regiment was reorganized as the 203rd Coast Artillery Regiment (Antiaircraft). On 18 March 1933, the headquarters location changed to Webb City, Missouri. On 1 October 1933, the regiment was relieved from the VII Corps and assigned to the General Headquarters Reserve. From 30 April to 4 May 1934, the 2nd Battalion performed riot control duty during a coal miners' strike at Mindenmines, Missouri. The entire regiment was used for flood control duty in southern Illinois from 21 January to 5 April 1937. Normal summer training usually took place at Camp Clark, near Nevada, Missouri. Because of the lack of locations suitable for live firing of 3-inch antiaircraft guns and machine guns in Missouri, the regiment conducted such training at locations like Camp Custer, Michigan, Fort Sill, Oklahoma, Fort Sheridan, Illinois, Camp Hulen, Texas, and Fort Barrancas, Florida. The regiment participated in major field army maneuvers at Fort Riley, Kansas, and Camp Ripley, Minnesota, in 1937 and 1940.

Organization of 203rd Coast Artillery Regiment (Antiaircraft), 1939
Unit	Location	Federally recognized	Notes
Headquarters	Webb City	2 June 1921	
Medical Department Detachment	Sarcoxie	22 July 1921	
Headquarters Battery	Monett	26 November 1923	
Service Battery	Aurora	3 May 1921	
Headquarters, 1st Battalion	Neosho	17 January 1921	
Headquarters Detachment and Combat Train, 1st Battalion	Lamar	17 January 1921	
Battery A (Searchlight)	Pierce City	25 January 1921	Originally organized as Headquarters Battery 25 January 1921; redesignated Battery D 25 October 1923; redesignated Battery A 1 November 1923
Battery B	Joplin	18 January 1921	
Battery C	Neosho	21 January 1921	
Battery D	Carthage	19 January 1921	Originally organized as Battery A 19 January 1921; redesignated Battery D 1 November 1923
Headquarters, 2nd Battalion	Lamar	28 April 1921	
Headquarters Detachment, 2nd Battalion	Springfield	28 April 1921	
Battery E	Anderson	22 January 1921	
Battery F	Springfield	24 January 1921	
Battery G	Webb City	20 January 1921	
Battery H	Nevada	7 July 1920	Originally organized as Battery A 7 July 1920; redesignated Battery H 19 April 1924

The regiment was inducted into federal service on 16 September 1940 and was assigned to the 33rd Coast Artillery Brigade (Antiaircraft). The 3rd Battalion was constituted on 27 May 1942 at Fort McDowell, California. The regiment was broken up on 12 February 1944 a and reorganized and redesignated as follows:

- HHB as HHB, 203rd Antiaircraft Artillery Group (eventually redesignated HHD 35th Division Trains)
- 1st Battalion as 86th Antiaircraft Artillery Gun Battalion
- 2nd Battalion as 592nd Antiaircraft Artillery Automatic Weapons Battalion
- 3rd Battalion as 299th Antiaircraft Searchlight Battalion

Units redesignated in 1946 as follows:

- 86th Battalion as 108th Mechanized Cavalry Reconnaissance Squadron (27 June 1946)
- 592nd Battalion as 196th Tank Battalion (27 June 1946)
- 299th Battalion as 175th Military Police Battalion (3 July 1946)

The 108th Mechanized Cavalry Reconnaissance Squadron was redesignated 1 November 1949 as 203rd Antiaircraft Artillery Automatic Weapons Battalion (Mobile), reorganized and redesignated 1 December 1952 as 203rd Antiaircraft Artillery Gun Battalion. redesignated 1 October 1953 as 203rd Antiaircraft Artillery Battalion (90mm).

- consolidated 15 April 1959 with 203rd Combat Arms Regiment, a parent regiment under the Combat Arms Regimental System. This was part of the larger reorganization that placed the Army National Guard under the ROCID/Pentomic organization. The battalion was redesignated 1st Reconnaissance Squadron, 203rd Combat Arms Regiment, and had its units remain in place at Joplin, Anderson, Monett, and Neosho.
- redesignated 203rd Armor Regiment, 1963
- redesignated 203rd Engineer Battalion, 1968

== Distinctive unit insignia ==
- Description

A houn’ dawg statant Proper on a gold ribbon scroll bearing the motto "DON’T KICK OUR DOG" in red. The insignia is made in pairs.

- Symbolism

The 203d Coast Artillery Regiment was known as "The Houn’ Dawg Regiment."

- Background

The distinctive unit insignia was originally approved for the 203d Coast Artillery Regiment on 12 January 1925. It was amended to have the insignia manufactured in pairs on 18 December 1926. The insignia was redesignated for the 203d Antiaircraft Artillery Automatic Weapons Battalion on 10 October 1950. It was redesignated for the 203d Armor Regiment on 26 October 1961. It was authorized for the 203d Engineer Battalion on 14 January 1969.

== Coat of arms ==
- Blazon
  - Shield: Gules, a houn’ dawg statant Or, on a chief Vert a pale of the second (Or) charged with an oak tree eradicated Proper.
  - Crest: That for the regiments and separate battalions of the Missouri Army National Guard: On a wreath of the colors Or and Gules, a grizzly bear standing rampant Proper.
  - Motto: "Don't Kick Our Dog".
- Symbolism
  - Shield: The shield is red for Artillery, charged with the indispensable companion of the Regiment, the Regiment having been for years known as "The Houn’ Dawg Regiment." The green chief represents the Mexican Border service, the yellow pale the Spanish War service and the oak tree the Argonne Forest, the Meuse-Argonne of World War
  - Crest: The crest is that of the Missouri Army National Guard.
- Background: The coat of arms was originally approved for the 203d Coast Artillery Regiment on 13 January 1925. It was redesignated for the 203d Antiaircraft Artillery Automatic Weapons Battalion on 6 October 1950. The insignia was redesignated for the 203d Armor Regiment on 26 October 1961. It was authorized for the 203d Engineer Battalion on 14 January 1969.

== Current organization ==
- 203rd Engineer Battalion, in Joplin
  - Headquarters and Headquarters Company, 203rd Engineer Battalion, in Joplin
  - Forward Support Company, 203rd Engineer Battalion, in Joplin
  - 276th Engineer Company (Vertical Construction Company), in Pierce City
    - Detachment 1, 276th Engineer Company (Vertical Construction Company), in Springfield
  - 294th Engineer Company (Engineer Support Company), in Carthage
  - 335th Engineer Platoon (Area Clearance), in Rolla
  - 1135th Engineer Company (Clearance), in Richmond
  - 1141st Engineer Company (Combat Engineer Company — Infantry), in Kansas City

== See also ==
- Coats of arms of U.S. Engineer Battalions
