= USS Nansemond =

USS Nansemond may refer to:

- USS Nansemond (1862) was a side wheel steamer in commission from 1863 to 1865 that served in the Union Navy during the American Civil War.
- USS Nansemond (ID-1395) was a transport that served during World War I from 1917 until 1919.
- USS Nansemond County (LST-1064), ex-USS LST-1064, a tank landing ship in commission from 1945 to 1946 that served towards the end of World War II.
