= 70th Troop Command =

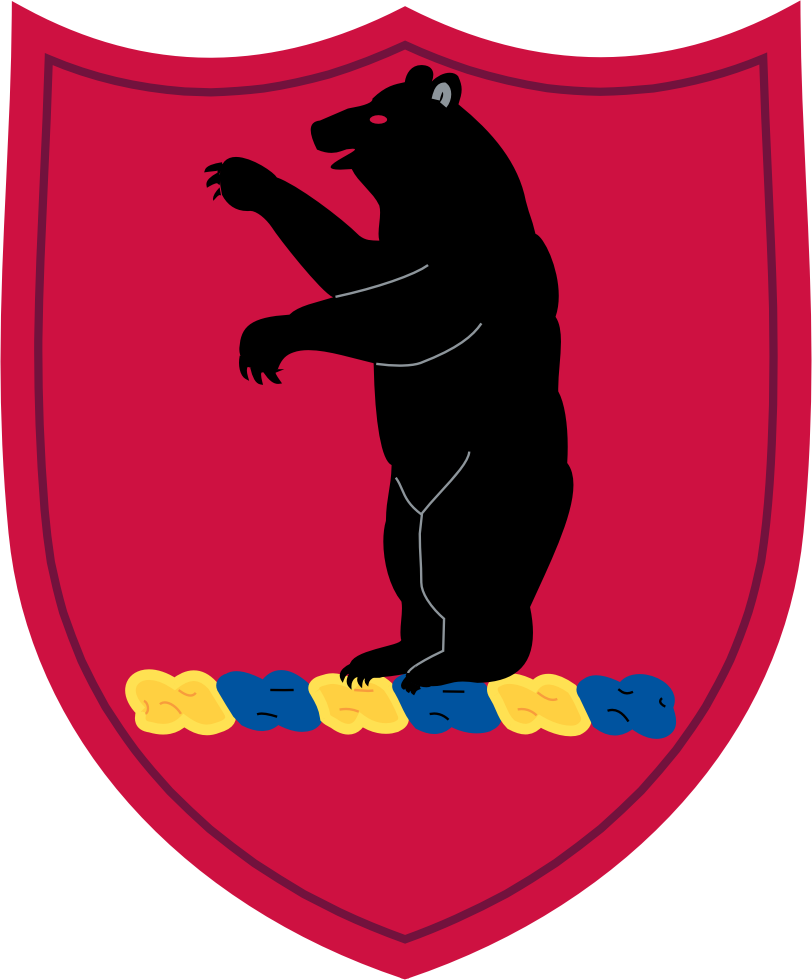
- Active: 1947 - Present
- Country: United States
- Allegiance: Missouri
- Branch: Missouri Army National Guard
- Type: Troop Command
- Role: Command and control of combat support and combat service support units
- Size: Brigade Sized
- Garrison/HQ: Lebanon, Missouri
- Engagements: Gulf War; Operation Desert Shield; Operation Desert Storm; Operation Noble Eagle; Operation Enduring Freedom; Operation Iraqi Freedom; Operation New Dawn; Operation Spartan Shield; Operation Inherent Resolve

The 70th Troop Command is a major headquarters of the Missouri Army National Guard, located in Lebanon, Missouri.

It provides command and control for a wide range of units within Missouri.

== History ==
The 70th Troop Command traces its lineage back to the post–World War II reorganization of the Missouri Army National Guard.

During the Cold War (1947–1990), Missouri Guard units such as military police, transportation, and medical detachments trained alongside active-duty Army units but never went overseas to participate in any Germany Deployment or Cold War situation.

The Gulf War (1990–1991) marked the first large-scale overseas mobilization for many of the command’s subordinate units. Soldiers deployed to Southwest Asia in support of Operations Desert Shield and Desert Storm, providing transportation and military police support.

Following the September 11 attacks, the 70th Troop Command deployed in support of the war on terror. Under Operation Noble Eagle, Missouri MPs and security elements guarded airports and infrastructure across the state.

Under Operation Enduring Freedom (2001–2014), the command sent MPs, medics, and transporters to Afghanistan, where they conducted detainee operations, convoy security, and medical support.

Soldiers also deployed to Iraq for Operation Iraqi Freedom (2003–2010), conducting convoy escort missions, route security, and sustainment operations. This went on into Operation New Dawn (2010–2011), where Missouri Guardsmen supported the drawdown of U.S. forces.

Most recently, elements of the 70th have deployed during Operation Inherent Resolve (2014–present) to Iraq and Syria in support of coalition operations against ISIS.

The 70th has also supported training exercises. In 2016, the 1221st Transportation Company, part of the 220th Transportation Battalion, carried out Operation Patriot Bandoleer, moving over 5.5 million pounds of ammunition in a 2,000-mile convoy across several states.

== Organization ==
- 70th Troop Command, in Lebanon
  - Headquarters and Headquarters Company, 70th Troop Command, in Lebanon
  - 7th Civil Support Team (WMD), at Jefferson City Airport
  - 70th Public Affairs Detachment, in Jefferson City
  - 135th Military History Detachment, in Jefferson City
  - 135th Army Band, in Springfield
  - Detachment 1, Cyber Protection Team 179, at Jefferson Barracks
  - 229th Medical Battalion (Multifunctional), in Fulton
    - Headquarters and Headquarters Detachment, 229th Medical Battalion (Multifunctional), in Fulton
    - 205th Medical Company (Ground Ambulance), at Jefferson Barracks
    - 206th Medical Company (Area Support), in Springfield
  - 835th Combat Sustainment Support Battalion, in Jefferson City
    - Headquarters and Headquarters Company, 835th Combat Sustainment Support Battalion, in Jefferson City
    - 735th Quartermaster Company (Field Service), in De Soto
    - 835th Quartermaster Company (Field Feeding), in Pierce City
      - Detachment 1, 835th Quartermaster Company (Field Feeding), in Warrensburg
      - Detachment 2, 835th Quartermaster Company (Field Feeding), in Festus
    - 1035th Ordnance Company (Support Maintenance), in Bridgeton
    - 1138th Transportation Company (Medium Truck) (Cargo), in Bridgeton
    - 1221st Transportation Company (Medium Truck) (Cargo), in Dexter
    - 3175th Chemical Company, in Bridgeton
