= Missouri National Guard =

Coordinates: 38°33′09.4″N 92°04′30.6″W

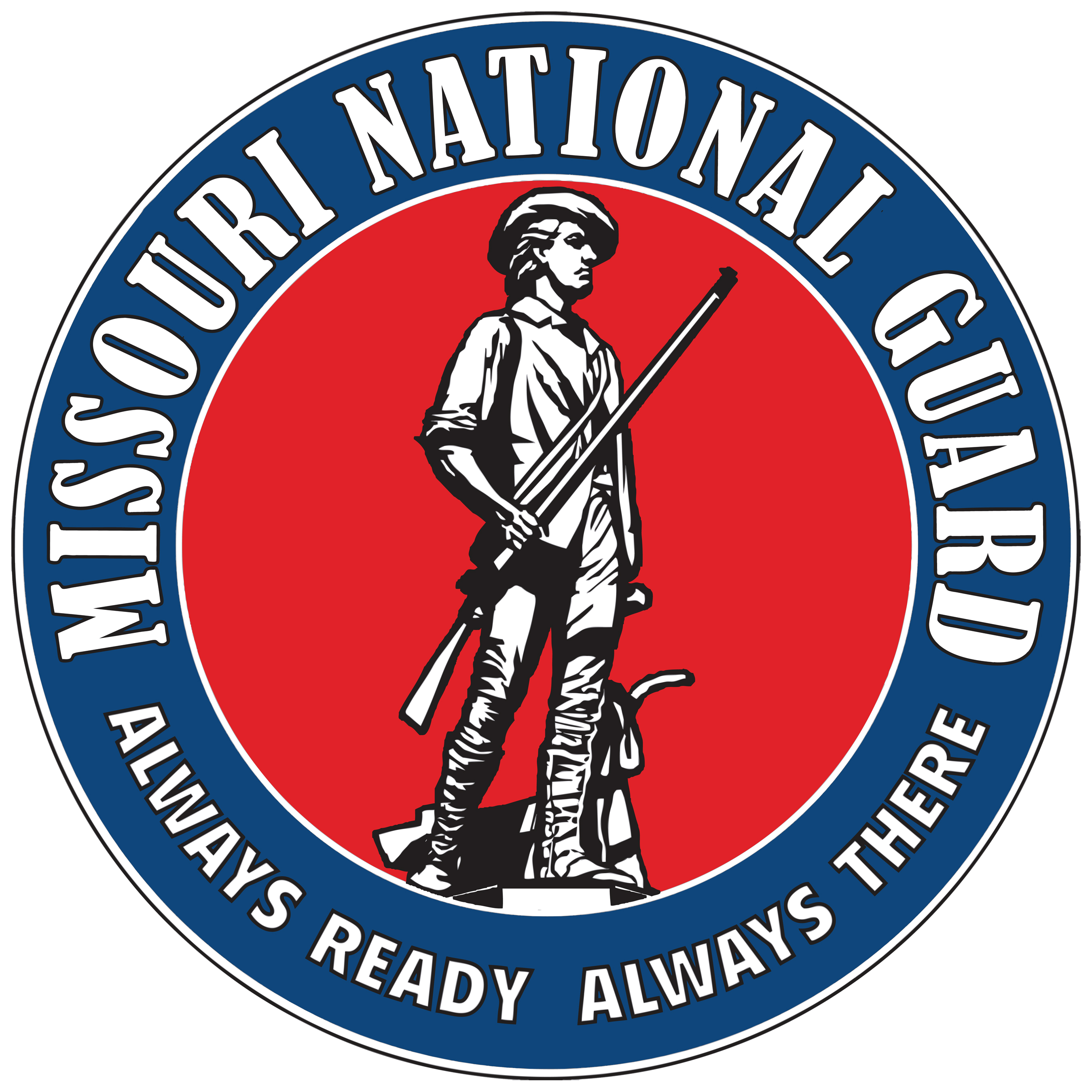
- Missouri National Guard logo
- Active: 1808 - 1877 State Militia 1877 - Present
- Country: United States
- Branch: United States Army; U.S. Air Force
- Type: military reserve force, Organized militia
- Role: Federal: provide combat forces State: Military aid to civil authorities, especially disaster relief
- Size: ~11,500 personnel
- Part of: Army National Guard; National Guard Bureau
- Headquarters: 2302 Militia Drive, Jefferson City, Missouri
- Motto: "Protectors of Peace"
- Engagements: Honey War; Mexican-American War; Battle of Embudo Pass; Siege of Pueblo De Taos; Battle of Sacramento (Mexico); American Civil War; Battle of Shiloh; Second Battle of Corinth; Battle of Iuka; Battle of Grand Gulf; Battle of Port Gibson; Battle of Champion Hill; Battle of Big Black River Bridge; Siege of Vicksburg; Battle of Ezra Church; Battle of Jonesborough; Battle of Kennesaw Mountain; Battle of Atlanta; Battle of Franklin; Battle of Nashville; Battle of Fort Blakeley; Spanish–American War; Mexican Punitive Expedition; World War I; Battle of Saint-Mihiel; Alsace–Lorraine; Meuse-Argonne Offensive; Battle of Cheppy; Battle of Vauquois; Battle of Charpentry; World War II; Louisiana Maneuvers; European Theatre; Normandy; Northern France; Rhineland; Ardennes-Alsace; Battle of the Bulge; Central Europe; Pacific Theatre; Aleutian Islands Campaign; Battle of Leyte; Battle of Okinawa; Operation Blacklist Forty; Korean War; Operation Just Cause; Gulf War; Operation Desert Shield; Operation Desert Storm; Operation Joint Forge; Operation Joint Guardian; Operation Northern Watch; Operation Southern Watch; Operation Noble Eagle; Operation Enduring Freedom; Operation Iraqi Freedom; Battle of Najaf; Operation Firecracker; Operation New Dawn; Operation Freedom Sentinel; Operation Spartan Shield; Operation Inherent Resolve; Battle of Baghuz Fawqani; Iran–Israel war; Operation Midnight Hammer; Mexican Border Service; Operation Jump Start; Operation Lone Star; Operation Faithful Patriot; Operation Epic Fury
- Website: moguard.ngb.mil

Commanders
- Commander-in-Chief (Title 10 USC): President of the United States (federalized)
- Commander-in-Chief (Title 32 USC): Governor of Missouri
- Adjutant General of Missouri: Major General Charles D. Hausman
- Deputy Adjutant General: Brigadier General Robert J. Payne
- State Command Chief Warrant Officer: Chief Warrant Officer 5 Shawn Schmidt
- Command Senior Enlisted Advisor: Command Chief Master Sergeant Jessica L. Settle
- State Command Sergeant Major: Command Sergeant Major Robert E. Koelling
- Notable commanders: Harry S. Truman; World War I

Insignia
- Abbreviation: MONG
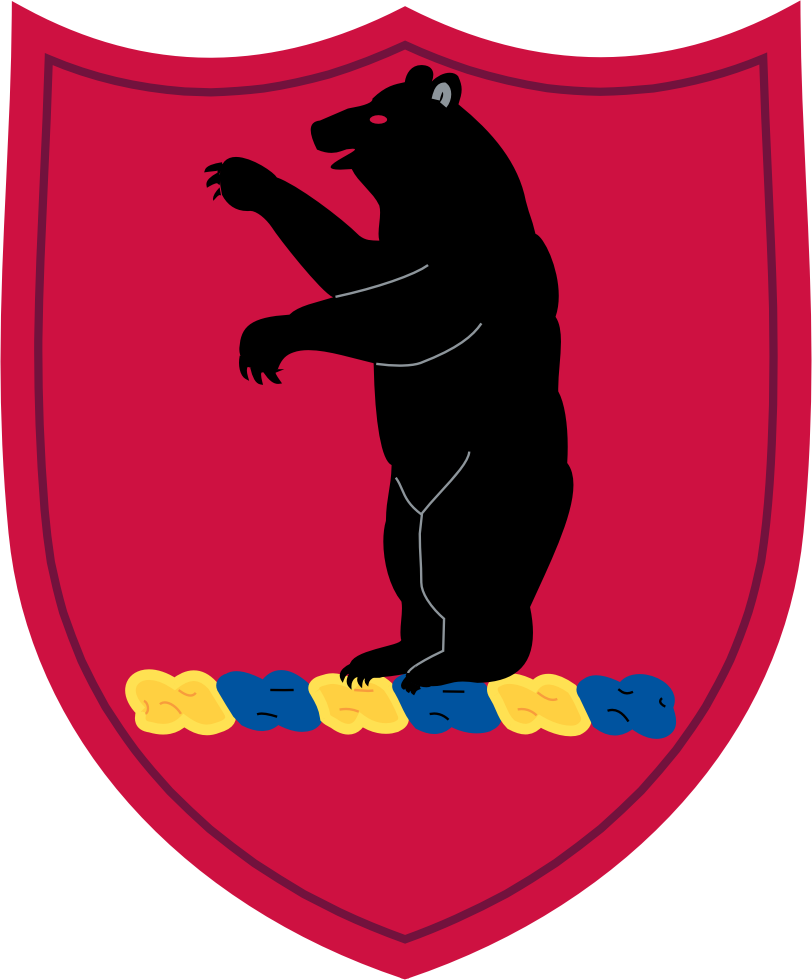
- Identification symbol

- Missouri ARNG Headquarters DUI

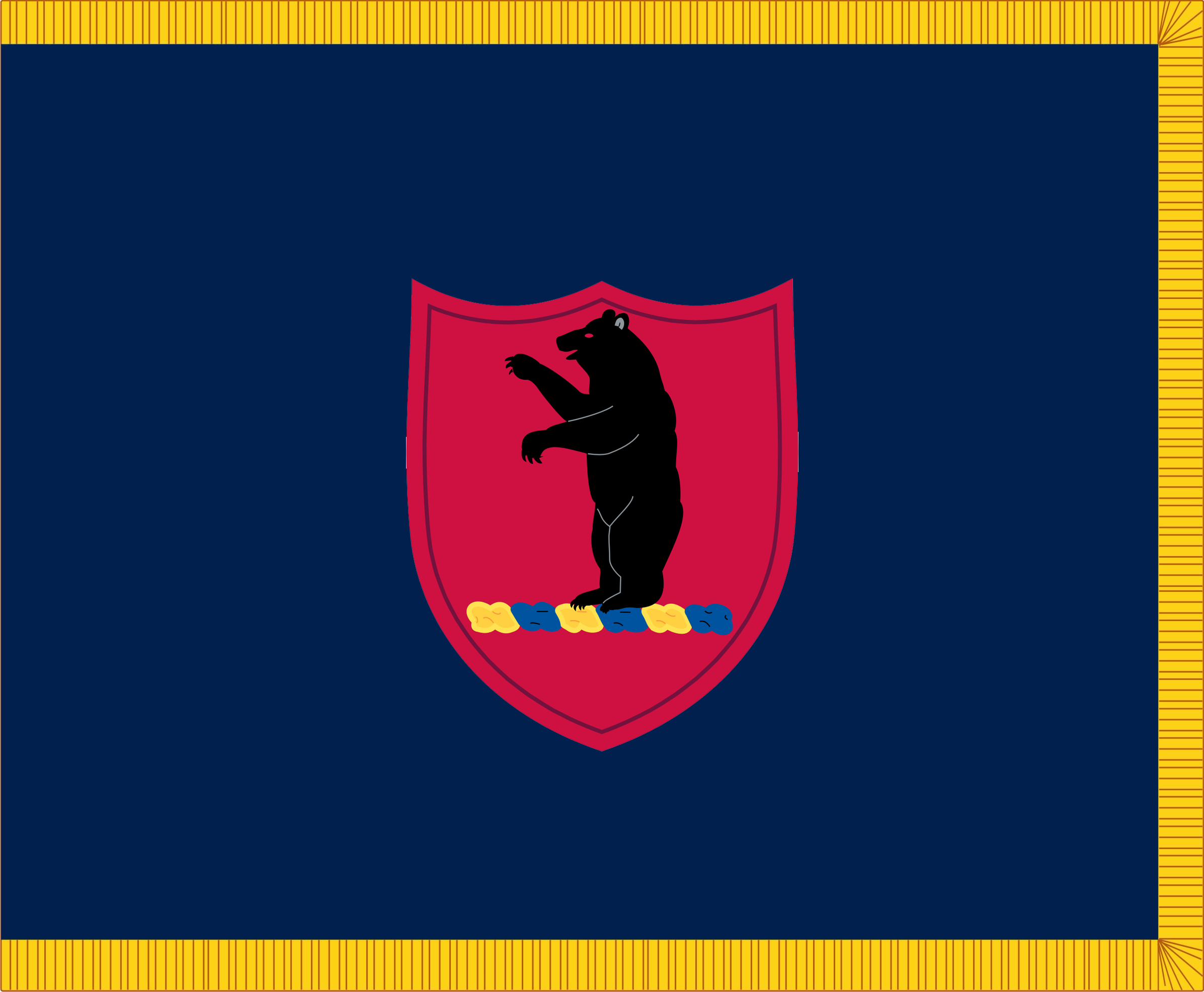
- Missouri ARNG Headquarters Flag

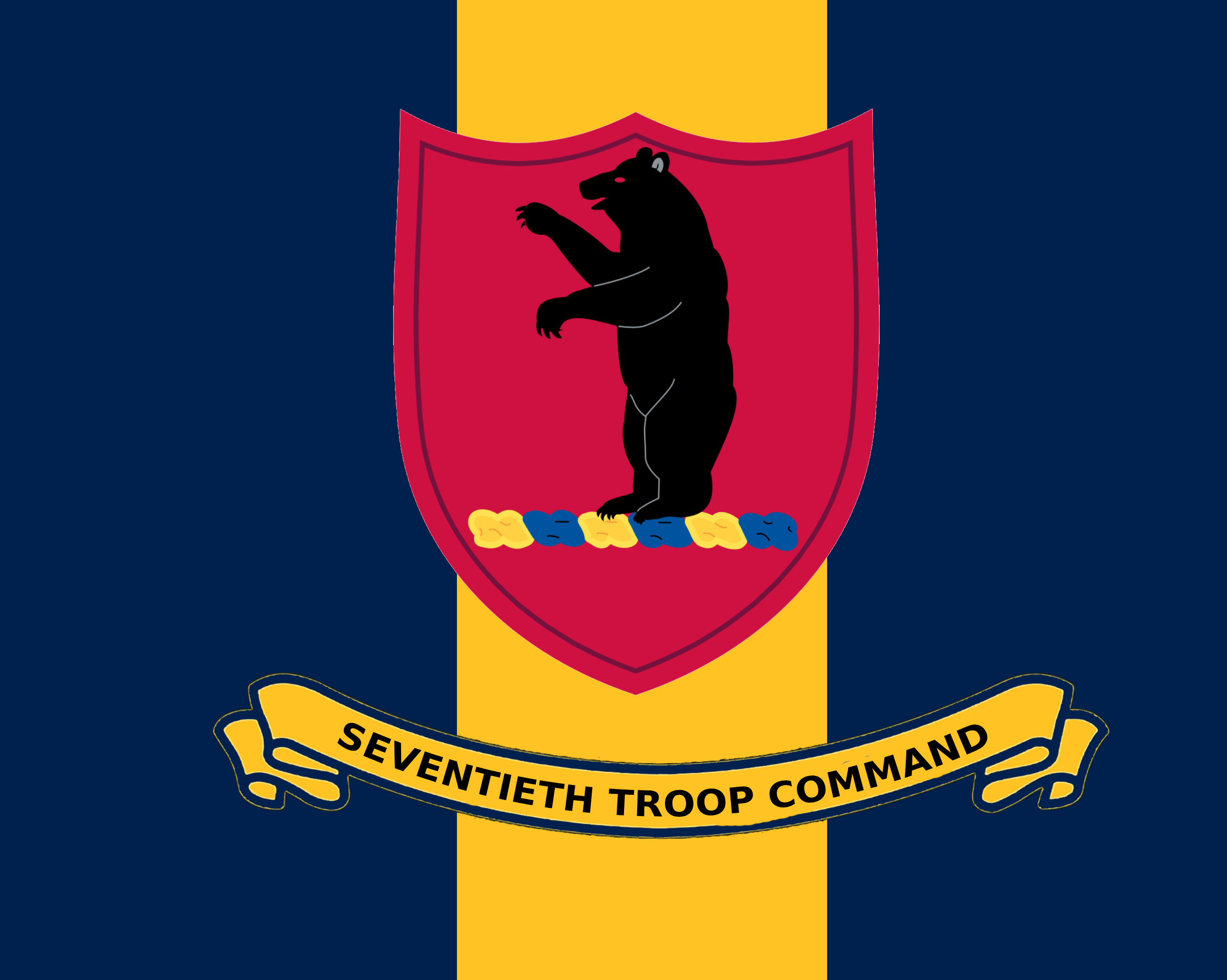
- Missouri ARNG 70th Troop Command Flag

- Missouri ARNG Crest

The Missouri National Guard (MONG), commonly known as the Missouri Guard, is a component of the Army National Guard and Missouri State Department of the National Guard. It is composed of Army and Air National Guard units. The department office is located in Jefferson City.

The state mission of the Missouri National Guard is "to provide trained and disciplined forces for domestic emergencies or as otherwise required by state law under the authority of the governor".

== History ==
During the American Civil War, Missouri units fought for both Union and Confederate causes. The Confederate 1st Missouri Infantry Regiment, later part of the 138th Infantry Regiment lineage, fought at Shiloh, Corinth, Iuka, Champion Hill, the Siege of Vicksburg, the Atlanta campaign, Franklin, and Nashville, among other engagements across the Western Theater.

Officially, the Missouri National Guard traces its lineage to the Missouri State Militia, created in 1861 to counter Confederate guerrillas during the American Civil War.

Missouri volunteers fought at the Battles of Embudo Pass and Taos and participated in the occupation of Chihuahua City during the Mexican-American War.

The Missouri Army National Guard was formally organized in 1877. It was first mobilized in the Spanish–American War (1898), raising six volunteer infantry regiments, though none deployed overseas.

In 1916, Missouri Guardsmen were sent to the U.S.–Mexico border at Laredo, Texas during the Mexican Punitive Expedition.

During World War I, Missouri units of the 35th Infantry Division fought in the Lorraine and Alsace sectors and in the Meuse–Argonne Offensive, including the Battles of Cheppy, Vauquois, and Charpentry.

In World War II, the Guard trained in the Louisiana Maneuvers before deploying to both the Pacific and European theaters. In the Pacific, Missouri units served in the Aleutian Islands campaign, mainly the 138th Infantry Regiment while other units fought at Leyte and Okinawa, mainly the 110th Engineer Regiment. After the war's end, the unit was sent to perform occupation duty in Seoul, Korea. In Europe, the 35th Infantry Division fought in the Invasion of Normandy and the Northern France, Rhineland, Ardennes-Alsace, and Central Europe campaigns.

The Missouri Air National Guard was established in 1947 and mobilized for service during the Korean War.

Throughout the Cold War stages, the Missouri Guard was mainly stationed state side and helping with Missouri duties such as the 1922 Poplar Bluff railroad strike, the 1927 St. Louis tornado, and major flooding in 1951–1952 and 1993. Although not mobilized as full units for the Vietnam War, many Missouri Air Guard pilots served on active duty in Southeast Asia.

In Operation Just Cause (1989), the 1138th Military Police Company was in Panama conducting Annual Training when eventually the invasion started, coming under fire and establishing the Empire Range EPW camp, this was the first Guard unit activated for combat since Vietnam. The same company deployed in the Gulf War, operating EPW Camp 301 in Saudi Arabia.

Since 2001, Missouri units have deployed widely in the Global War on Terror. In Iraq, the 1140th Engineer Battalion fought in the Battle of Najaf (2004), while the 35th Engineer Brigade and several MP companies conducted security and detainee operations.

In Afghanistan, the 203rd Engineer Battalion conducted IED clearance (2009–2010), and the 1st Battalion, 135th Aviation Regiment flew AH-64 Apache's and UH-60 Black Hawks (2013–2014).

The 35th Infantry Division commanded multinational forces in Bosnia (2003–2004), and the 110th MEB deployed to Kosovo (2008–2009).

More recently, the 110th MEB deployed to Qatar (2017), the 35th Combat Aviation Brigade commanded Task Force Trailblazer in Iraq and Syria (2018–2019), and the 1st Battalion, 138th Infantry Regiment deployed to Kuwait and Syria (2023–2024), where Guardsmen engaged in combat and received Combat Infantryman Badges.

In June 2025, the Missouri Air National Guard's 131st Bomb Wing, flying B-2 Spirit bombers from Whiteman AFB, participated in Operation Midnight Hammer, U.S. strikes on Iranian nuclear facilities at Fordow, Natanz, and Isfahan. The mission involved over 125 aircraft and the use of GBU-57 Massive Ordnance Penetrators, and was the largest B-2 strike in U.S. history.

On November 8, 2022, Missouri voters approved Amendment 5, establishing the Missouri Department of the National Guard as a cabinet-level agency independent of the Department of Public Safety. Missouri also briefly maintained a State Defense Force (2012–2022) for stateside support missions.

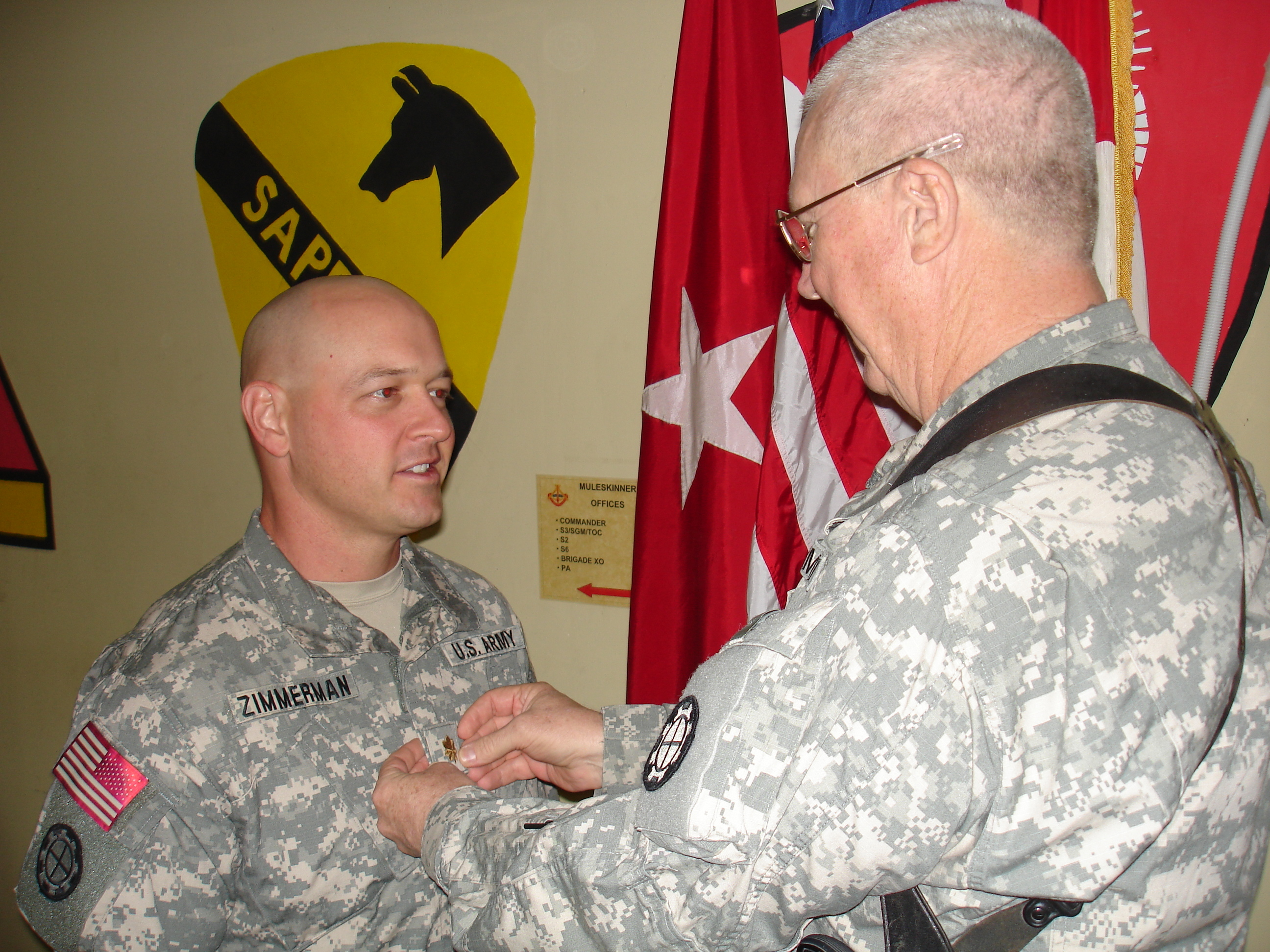
Thomas S. Zimmerman, of Springfield, Mo., is promoted to the rank of major by Brig. Gen. Michael B. Pace, commander of 35th Engineer Brigade, during a ceremony on Camp Liberty, Baghdad, Nov. 19.

== Organization ==
| Direct reporting units | Component | Location of headquarters |
|---|---|---|
| Missouri Joint Force Headquarters | Army and Air National Guard | Jefferson City |
| 110th Maneuver Enhancement Brigade | Army National Guard | Kansas City |
| Combat Aviation Brigade, 35th Infantry Division | Army National Guard | Sedalia |
| 35th Military Police Brigade | Army National Guard | Jefferson Barracks |
| 35th Engineer Brigade | Army National Guard | Fort Leonard Wood |
| 35th Infantry Division | Army National Guard | Lexington |
| 1107th Theater Aviation Support Group | Army National Guard | Springfield |
| 70th Troop Command | Army National Guard | Lebanon |
| 131st Bomb Wing | Air National Guard | Whiteman Air Force Base |
| 139th Airlift Wing | Air National Guard | Rosecrans Memorial Airport |
| Missouri Army National Guard Support Elements | Army and Air National Guard | Varies |

=== Missouri Army National Guard ===
- Joint Force Headquarters-Missouri, Army Element, in Jefferson City
  - Headquarters and Headquarters Detachment, Joint Force Headquarters-Missouri, Army Element, in Jefferson City
  - Missouri Recruiting & Retention Battalion, in Jefferson City
    - Detachment 1, Missouri Recruiting & Retention Battalion, in St. Joseph
    - Detachment 2, Missouri Recruiting & Retention Battalion, in Kansas City
    - Detachment 3, Missouri Recruiting & Retention Battalion, in Clinton
    - Detachment 4, Missouri Recruiting & Retention Battalion, in Springfield
    - Detachment 5, Missouri Recruiting & Retention Battalion, in Cape Girardeau
    - Detachment 6, Missouri Recruiting & Retention Battalion, in Jefferson City
    - Detachment 7, Missouri Recruiting & Retention Battalion, in Festus
    - Detachment 8, Missouri Recruiting & Retention Battalion, in Macon
    - Detachment 9, Missouri Recruiting & Retention Battalion (Guard Officer Leadership Development) at Southeast Missouri State University, in Cape Girardeau
    - Detachment 10, Missouri Recruiting & Retention Battalion (Guard Officer Leadership Development) at Missouri Southern State University, in Joplin
    - Detachment 11, Missouri Recruiting & Retention Battalion (Guard Officer Leadership Development) at Northwest Missouri State University, in Maryville
    - Detachment 12, Missouri Recruiting & Retention Battalion (Guard Officer Leadership Development) at William Woods University, in Fulton
    - Detachment 13, Missouri Recruiting & Retention Battalion, in Bridgeton
    - Detachment 14, Missouri Recruiting & Retention Battalion, in Carthage
  - Missouri Medical Detachment, in Jefferson City
    - Detachment 1, Missouri Medical Detachment, in Neosho
  - 429th Judge Advocate General Trial Defense Team, in Jefferson City
    - Detachment 1, 429th Judge Advocate General Trial Defense Team, in Lincoln (NE) — (Nebraska Army National Guard)
  - 529th Judge Advocate General Detachment, in Jefferson City
  - Camp Crowder Training Center, in Neosho
  - Army Aviation Support Facility #1, at Whiteman Air Force Base
  - Army Aviation Support Facility #2, at Forney Field at Fort Leonard Wood
  - Army Aviation Support Facility #3, at Springfield Airport
  - Army Aviation Support Facility #4, at Jefferson City Airport
  - Combined Support Maintenance Shop #1, in Jefferson City
  - Field Maintenance Shop #1, in Raytown
  - Field Maintenance Shop #2, in Festus
  - Field Maintenance Shop #3, in Cape Girardeau
  - Field Maintenance Shop #4, in Poplar Bluff
  - Field Maintenance Shop #5, at Fort Leonard Wood
  - Field Maintenance Shop #6, in St. Joseph
  - Field Maintenance Shop #7, in Marshall
  - Field Maintenance Shop #8, in Macon
  - Field Maintenance Shop #10, in Lambert
  - Field Maintenance Shop #11, in Springfield
  - Field Maintenance Shop #12, in Harrisonville
  - Field Maintenance Shop #13, in Neosho
  - Field Maintenance Shop #14, in Trenton
  - Field Maintenance Shop #15, in Nevada
  - 35th Infantry Division, at Fort Leavenworth (KS) — (Kansas Army National Guard)
    - Headquarters and Headquarters Battalion, 35th Infantry Division, at Fort Leavenworth (KS) — (Kansas Army National Guard)
      - Headquarters Support Company, 35th Infantry Division, at Fort Leavenworth (KS) — (Kansas Army National Guard)
        - Detachment 1, Headquarters Support Company, 35th Infantry Division, in Lexington
      - Company A (Operations), Headquarters and Headquarters Battalion, 35th Infantry Division, at Fort Leavenworth (KS) — (Kansas Army National Guard)
        - Detachment 1, Company A (Operations), Headquarters and Headquarters Battalion, 35th Infantry Division, in St. Joseph
      - Company B (Intelligence and Sustainment), Headquarters and Headquarters Battalion, 35th Infantry Division, at Jefferson Barracks
        - Detachment 1, Company B (Intelligence and Sustainment), Headquarters and Headquarters Battalion, 35th Infantry Division, at Fort Leavenworth (KS) — (Kansas Army National Guard)
        - Detachment 2, Company B (Intelligence and Sustainment), Headquarters and Headquarters Battalion, 35th Infantry Division, in St. Joseph
      - Company C (Signal), Headquarters and Headquarters Battalion, 35th Infantry Division, in St. Joseph
      - 35th Infantry Division Band, in Olathe (KS) — (Kansas Army National Guard)
    - 35th Combat Aviation Brigade, in Sedalia
      - Headquarters and Headquarters Company, 35th Combat Aviation Brigade, in Sedalia
      - Detachment 2, Company G (MEDEVAC), 3rd Battalion (General Support Aviation), 238th Aviation Regiment, at Springfield Airport
        - Detachment 6, Company D (AVUM), 3rd Battalion (General Support Aviation), 238th Aviation Regiment, at Springfield Airport (MO)
        - Detachment 7, Company E (Forward Support), 3rd Battalion (General Support Aviation), 238th Aviation Regiment, at Springfield Airport
      - Detachment 2, Company C, 2nd Battalion (Fixed Wing), 245th Aviation Regiment, at Jefferson City Airport
      - 1st Battalion (Assault), 108th Aviation Regiment, at Topeka Airport (KS) — (Kansas Army National Guard)
      - 1st Battalion (Assault), 135th Aviation Regiment, at Whiteman Air Force Base
        - Headquarters and Headquarters Company, 1st Battalion (Assault), 135th Aviation Regiment, at Whiteman Air Force Base
          - Detachment 1, Headquarters and Headquarters Company, 1st Battalion (Assault), 135th Aviation Regiment, at Johnstown–Cambria County Airport (PA) — (Pennsylvania Army National Guard)
        - Company A, 1st Battalion (Assault), 135th Aviation Regiment, at Whiteman Air Force Base (UH-60M Black Hawk)
        - Company B, 1st Battalion (Assault), 135th Aviation Regiment, at Fort Leonard Wood (UH-60M Black Hawk)
        - Company C, 1st Battalion (Assault), 135th Aviation Regiment, at Whiteman Air Force Base (UH-60M Black Hawk)
          - Detachment 1, Company C, 1st Battalion (Assault), 135th Aviation Regiment, at Johnstown–Cambria County Airport (PA) (UH-60M Black Hawk) — (Pennsylvania Army National Guard)
        - Company D (AVUM), 1st Battalion (Assault), 135th Aviation Regiment, at Whiteman Air Force Base
          - Detachment 1, Company D (AVUM), 1st Battalion (Assault), 135th Aviation Regiment, at Johnstown–Cambria County Airport (PA) — (Pennsylvania Army National Guard)
        - Company E (Forward Support), 1st Battalion (Assault), 135th Aviation Regiment, at Whiteman Air Force Base
          - Detachment 1, Company E (Forward Support), 1st Battalion (Assault), 135th Aviation Regiment, at Johnstown–Cambria County Airport (PA) — (Pennsylvania Army National Guard)
      - 2nd Battalion (General Support Aviation), 211th Aviation Regiment, at South Valley Airport (UT) — (Utah Army National Guard)
      - 1st Battalion (Security & Support), 376th Aviation Regiment, at Central Nebraska Airport (NE) — (Nebraska Army National Guard)
        - Company B, 1st Battalion (Security & Support), 376th Aviation Regiment, at Jefferson City Airport (UH-72A Lakota)
      - 935th Aviation Support Battalion, in Springfield
        - Headquarters Support Company, 935th Aviation Support Battalion, in Springfield
        - Company A (Distribution), 935th Aviation Support Battalion, in Aurora
        - Company B (AVIM), 935th Aviation Support Battalion, at Greater Kankakee Airport (IL) — (Illinois Army National Guard)
          - Detachment 1, Company B (AVIM), 935th Aviation Support Battalion, at Rapid City Airport (SD) — (South Dakota Army National Guard)
          - Detachment 2, Company B (AVIM), 935th Aviation Support Battalion, at Hunter Army Airfield (GA) — (Georgia Army National Guard)
          - Detachment 3, Company B (AVIM), 935th Aviation Support Battalion, at Springfield–Branson Airport
          - Detachment 5, Company B (AVIM), 935th Aviation Support Battalion, at Peoria Air National Guard Base (IL) — (Illinois Army National Guard)
        - Company C (Signal), 935th Aviation Support Battalion, in Sedalia
    - 110th Maneuver Enhancement Brigade, in Kansas City
      - Headquarters Support Company, 110th Maneuver Enhancement Brigade, at Kansas City
      - 135th Signal Company, in Kansas City
      - 1st Battalion, 138th Infantry Regiment, at Jefferson Barracks (part of 39th Infantry Brigade Combat Team)
        - Headquarters and Headquarters Company, 1st Battalion, 138th Infantry Regiment, at Jefferson Barracks
          - Detachment 2, Headquarters and Headquarters Battery, 1st Battalion, 206th Field Artillery Regiment, at Jefferson Barracks
        - Company A, 1st Battalion, 138th Infantry Regiment, in Mexico
        - Company B, 1st Battalion, 138th Infantry Regiment, in Bridgeton
        - Company C, 1st Battalion, 138th Infantry Regiment, in Perryville
        - Company D (Weapons), 1st Battalion, 138th Infantry Regiment, in Sikeston
        - Company I (Forward Support), 39th Brigade Support Battalion, in Poplar Bluff
      - 3rd Battalion, 138th Infantry Regiment, in Kansas City (part of 72nd Infantry Brigade Combat Team)
        - Headquarters and Headquarters Company, 3rd Battalion, 138th Infantry Regiment, in Kansas City
        - Company A, 3rd Battalion, 138th Infantry Regiment, in Boonville
        - Company B, 3rd Battalion, 138th Infantry Regiment, in Lamar
        - Company C, 3rd Battalion, 138th Infantry Regiment, in West Plains
        - Company D (Weapons), 3rd Battalion, 138th Infantry Regiment, in Clinton
        - Company I (Forward Support), 536th Brigade Support Battalion, in Jefferson City
      - 1st Battalion, 129th Field Artillery Regiment, in Maryville (M777A2) (part of 130th Field Artillery Brigade)
        - Headquarters and Headquarters Battery, 1st Battalion, 129th Field Artillery Regiment, in Maryville
        - Battery A, 1st Battalion, 119th Field Artillery Regiment, in Albany
        - Battery B, 1st Battalion, 119th Field Artillery Regiment, in Chillicothe
        - Battery C, 1st Battalion, 119th Field Artillery Regiment, in Independence
        - 1128th Forward Support Company, in Marshall
  - 35th Engineer Brigade, at Fort Leonard Wood
    - Headquarters and Headquarters Company, 35th Engineer Brigade, at Fort Leonard Wood
    - 235th Engineer Detachment (Construction Management Team), at Fort Leonard Wood
    - 635th Engineer Detachment (Forward Engineer Support Team — Advance), at Jefferson Barracks
    - 203rd Engineer Battalion, in Joplin
      - Headquarters and Headquarters Company, 203rd Engineer Battalion, in Joplin
      - Forward Support Company, 203rd Engineer Battalion, in Joplin
      - 276th Engineer Company (Vertical Construction Company), in Pierce City
        - Detachment 1, 276th Engineer Company (Vertical Construction Company), in Springfield
      - 294th Engineer Company (Engineer Support Company), in Carthage
      - 335th Engineer Platoon (Area Clearance), in Rolla
      - 1135th Engineer Company (Clearance), in Richmond
      - 1141st Engineer Company (Combat Engineer Company — Infantry), in Kansas City
    - 1140th Engineer Battalion, in Cape Girardeau
      - Headquarters and Headquarters Company, 1140th Engineer Battalion, in Cape Girardeau
      - Forward Support Company, 1140th Engineer Battalion, in Cape Girardeau
      - 220th Engineer Company (Engineer Construction Company), in Festus
      - 1138th Engineer Company (Combat Engineer Company — Infantry), in Farmington
      - 1438th Engineer Company (Multirole Bridge), in Macon
        - Detachment 1, 1438th Engineer Company (Multirole Bridge), in Moberly
  - 35th Military Police Brigade, at Jefferson Barracks
    - Headquarters and Headquarters Company, 35th Military Police Brigade, at Jefferson Barracks
    - 175th Military Police Battalion, in Columbia
      - Headquarters and Headquarters Detachment, 175th Military Police Battalion, in Columbia
      - 1139th Military Police Company (Combat Support), in Kansas City
      - 3175th Military Police Company (Combat Support), in Warrenton
        - Detachment 1, 3175th Military Police Company (Combat Support), in Hannibal
    - 205th Military Police Battalion, in Poplar Bluff
      - Headquarters and Headquarters Detachment, 205th Military Police Battalion, in Poplar Bluff
      - 1136th Military Police Company (Combat Support), in Springfield
        - Detachment 1, 1136th Military Police Company (Combat Support), in Rolla
      - 1137th Military Police Company (Combat Support), in Kennett
        - Detachment 1, 1137th Military Police Company (Combat Support), in Jackson
      - 1175th Military Police Company (Combat Support), in St. Clair
    - 220th Transportation Battalion (Motor), in Fredericktown
      - Headquarters and Headquarters Detachment, 220th Transportation Battalion (Motor), in Fredericktown
      - 548th Transportation Company (Medium Truck) (PLS), in Trenton
        - Detachment 1, 548th Transportation Company (Medium Truck) (PLS), in Lexington
      - 1231st Transportation Company (Light-Medium Truck), in Bridgeton
        - Detachment 1, 1231st Transportation Company (Light-Medium Truck), in Columbia
      - 1241st Transportation Company (Medium Truck) (Cargo), in Monett
        - Detachment 1, 1241st Transportation Company (Medium Truck) (Cargo), in Anderson
      - 1251st Transportation Company (Medium Truck) (Cargo), in Harrisonville
        - Detachment 1, 1251st Transportation Company (Medium Truck) (Cargo), in Nevada
  - 70th Troop Command, in Lebanon
    - Headquarters and Headquarters Company, 70th Troop Command, in Lebanon
    - 7th Civil Support Team (WMD), at Jefferson City Airport
    - 70th Public Affairs Detachment, in Jefferson City
    - 135th Military History Detachment, in Jefferson City
    - 135th Army Band, in Springfield
    - Detachment 1, Cyber Protection Team 179, at Jefferson Barracks
    - 229th Medical Battalion (Multifunctional), in Fulton
      - Headquarters and Headquarters Detachment, 229th Medical Battalion (Multifunctional), in Fulton
      - 205th Medical Company (Ground Ambulance), at Jefferson Barracks
      - 206th Medical Company (Area Support), in Springfield
    - 835th Combat Sustainment Support Battalion, in Jefferson City
      - Headquarters and Headquarters Company, 835th Combat Sustainment Support Battalion, in Jefferson City
      - 735th Quartermaster Company (Field Service), in De Soto
      - 835th Quartermaster Company (Field Feeding), in Pierce City
        - Detachment 1, 835th Quartermaster Company (Field Feeding), in Warrensburg
        - Detachment 2, 835th Quartermaster Company (Field Feeding), in Festus
      - 1035th Ordnance Company (Support Maintenance), in Bridgeton
      - 1138th Transportation Company (Medium Truck) (Cargo), in Bridgeton
      - 1221st Transportation Company (Medium Truck) (Cargo), in Dexter
      - 3175th Chemical Company, in Bridgeton
  - 1107th Theater Aviation Sustainment Maintenance Group, at Springfield Airport
    - Headquarters and Headquarters Detachment, 1107th Theater Aviation Sustainment Maintenance Group, at Springfield Airport
    - Company A (Aviation Support), 1107th Theater Aviation Sustainment Maintenance Group, at Springfield Airport
    - Company B (Ground Support), 1107th Theater Aviation Sustainment Maintenance Group, at Springfield Airport
  - 140th Regiment, Regional Training Institute, at Fort Leonard Wood
    - 1st Battalion (Engineer), at Fort Leonard Wood
    - 2nd Battalion (General Support), at Fort Leonard Wood
    - Regional Training Site-Maintenance, at Fort Leonard Wood

Aviation unit abbreviations: MEDEVAC — Medical evacuation; AVUM — Aviation Unit Maintenance; AVIM — Aviation Intermediate Maintenance

=== Missouri Air National Guard ===
- Joint Force Headquarters-Missouri, Air Force Element, in Jefferson City
  - Headquarters Missouri Air National Guard, in Jefferson City
    - 131st Civil Engineer Squadron, at Jefferson Barracks
    - 131st Communication Flight, at Jefferson Barracks
    - 157th Air Operations Group, at Jefferson Barracks
    - 231st Civil Engineer Flight, at Jefferson Barracks
    - 239th Combat Command Squadron, at Jefferson Barracks
    - 241st Air Traffic Control Squadron, at Jefferson Barracks
    - 131st Bomb Wing, at Whiteman Air Force Base
      - Headquarters 131st Bomb Wing
        - Detachment 1, 131st Bomb Wing, at Fort Leonard Wood
      - 131st Operations Group
        - 110th Bomb Squadron
        - 131st Operations Support Flight
      - 131st Maintenance Group
        - 131st Aircraft Maintenance Squadron
        - 131st Maintenance Squadron
        - 131st Maintenance Operations Flight
      - 131st Medical Group
      - 131st Mission Support Group
        - 131st Civil Engineer Squadron
        - 131st Communications Flight
        - 131st Contracting Squadron
        - 131st Force Support Squadron
        - 131st Logistics Readiness Squadron
    - 139th Airlift Wing, at Rosecrans Air National Guard Base
      - Headquarters 139th Airlift Wing
      - 139th Operations Group
        - 180th Airlift Squadron
        - 139th Operations Support Flight
      - 139th Maintenance Group
        - 139th Aircraft Maintenance Squadron
        - 139th Maintenance Squadron
        - 139th Maintenance Operations Flight
      - 139th Medical Group
      - 139th Mission Support Group
        - 139th Force Support Squadron
        - 139th Logistics Readiness Squadron
        - 139th Communications Squadron
        - 139th Security Forces Squadron
        - 139th Civil Engineer Squadron

== Major facilities ==
Missouri Army National Guard

- Camp Clark, Missouri: Former POW Camp operated by the Missouri National Guard for unit training east of Nevada, Missouri
- Camp Crowder: Former Signal training and rocket engine manufacturing site; approximately 10% of the post remains for training southeast of Neosho, Missouri
- Fort Leonard Wood: Several Missouri National Guard units are tenant organizations on Fort Leonard Wood
- Ike Skelton Training Site: Missouri National Guard Headquarters located in eastern Jefferson City, Missouri
- Jefferson Barracks Military Post: Jointly operated between the Missouri National Guard and United States Army Reserve
- Macon Training Site: Field training site located south of Macon, Missouri
- Truman Training Site: Unimproved training area located on Corps of Engineers land at Truman Reservoir
- Wappapello Training Site: Located south of Wappapello, Missouri on United States Forest Service land; open to the public except for fenced administrative areas
- Whiteman Air Force Base: 1-135th Aviation (Assault) is a tenant organization on Whiteman Air Force Base

In addition, the Missouri National Guard operates 15 Field Maintenance Shops across the state at various armories and installations.

Missouri Air National Guard

- Jefferson Barracks
- Whiteman Air Force Base
- Rosecrans Memorial Airport

== Decorations of the Missouri National Guard ==
Missouri National Guard State Awards:

- Missouri Meritorious Service Medal
- Missouri Conspicuous Service Medal
- Missouri Commendation Ribbon
- Missouri Desert Storm Ribbon
- Missouri 20 Year Long Service Ribbon
- Missouri 15 Year Long Service Ribbon
- Missouri 10 Year Long Service Ribbon
- Missouri 5 Year Long Service Ribbon
- Missouri First Sergeant Ribbon
- Missouri Expeditionary Ribbon
- Missouri State Emergency Duty Ribbon
- Missouri Panamanian Service Ribbon
- Missouri Afghanistan Campaign Ribbon
- Missouri Kosovo Campaign Ribbon
- Missouri Recruiting and Retention Ribbon
- Missouri Adjutant General's Twenty Ribbon
- Missouri Governor's Twelve Ribbon
- Missouri Basic Training Ribbon
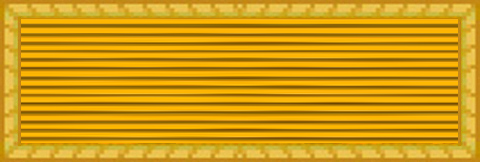
- Governor's Unit Citation

== Campaign streamers ==
| Mexican-American War | Operations / Campaigns |
|---|---|
| | New Mexico 1847 |
| | Chihuahua 1848 |

| Civil War (Confederate Service) |
|---|---|
| | Shiloh 1862 |
| | Mississippi 1862 |
| | Louisiana 1863 |
| | Mississippi River 1863 |
| | Vicksburg 1863 |
| | Alabama 1864 |
| | Atlanta 1864 |
| | Nashville 1864 |
| | Alabama 1865 |

| Mexican Punitive Expedition |
|---|---|
| | Laredo, Texas 1916 |

| World War I |
|---|---|
| | Battle of St. Mihiel 1918 |
| | Meuse-Argonne 1918 (Includes Alsace-Lorraine Defense) |

| World War II |
|---|---|
| | Normandy 1944 |
| | Northern France 1944 |
| | Rhineland 1944 - 1945 |
| | Ardennes-Alsace 1944 - 1945 |
| | Central Europe 1945 |
| | Aleutian Islands Campaign 1942 - 1943 |
| | Battle of Leyte 1944 - 1945 |
| | Battle of Okinawa 1945 |
| | Pacific Theater - South Korea (Post WWII/Occupation Duties) 1945 - 1946 |

| Operation Just Cause |
|---|---|
| | Panama 1989 - 1990 |

| Gulf War |
|---|---|
| | Operation Desert Shield 1990 - 1991 |
| | Operation Desert Storm 1991 |

| Iraqi NO-FLY ZONE |
|---|---|
| | Operation Provide Comfort l & ll |
| | Operation Northern Watch |
| | Operation Southern Watch |

| Kosovo |
|---|---|
| | KFOR MNTF-E 2008 - 2009 |

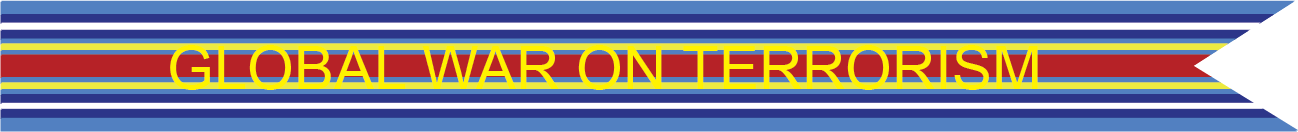
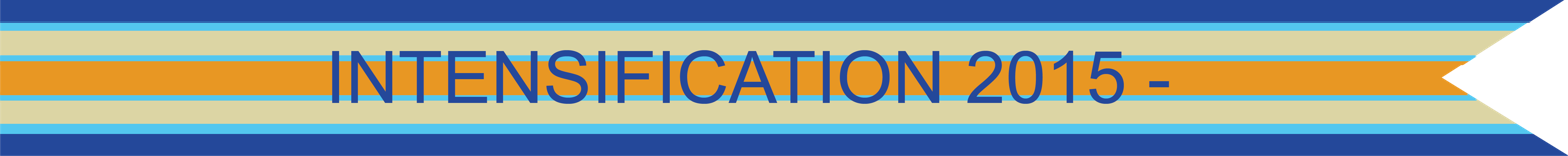
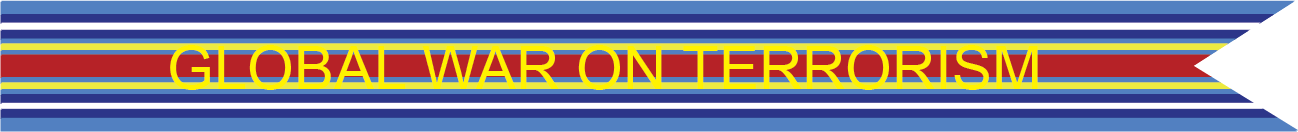
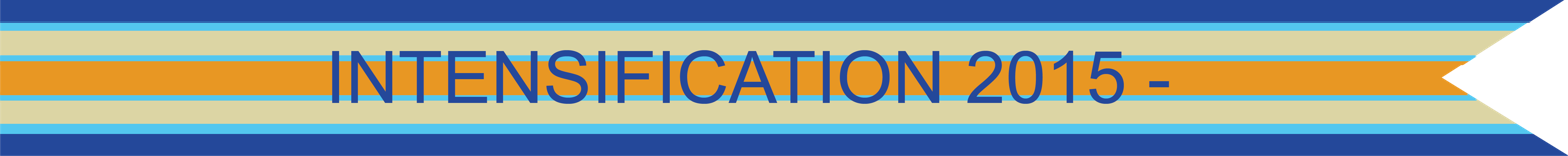
| Global War on Terrorism |
|---|---|
| | Operation Iraqi Freedom 2003 - 2004 |
| | Operation Iraqi Freedom 2004 - 2006 |
| | Operation Enduring Freedom - Afghanistan 2003 - 2006 |
| | Operation Enduring Freedom - Afghanistan 2007 - 2008 |
| | Operation Enduring Freedom - Afghanistan 2009 - 2010 |
| | Operation Enduring Freedom - Afghanistan 2013 - 2014 |
| | Operation Enduring Freedom - Qatar 2017 - 2018 |
| | Operation Inherent Resolve 2018 - 2019 |
| | Operation Spartan Shield - Kuwait 2023 - 2024 |
| | Operation Inherent Resolve 2023 - 2024 |

== Bibliography ==
- Adjutant-General's Office (1902). Correspondence Relating to the War with Spain and Conditions Growing Out of the Same; Including the Insurrection in the Philippine Islands and China Relief Expeditions, Between the Adjutant-General of the Army and Military Commanders in the United States, Cuba, Porto Rico, China, and the Philippine Islands from April 15, 1898 to July 30, 1902. Vol. 1. Washington, D.C.: United States Government Publishing Office. p. 532.
