= 1140th Engineer Battalion =

- shoulder sleeve insignia
- Active: 1967 - Present
- Country: United States
- Allegiance: Missouri; United States of America
- Branch: United States Army National Guard
- Type: Combat Engineer
- Role: Mobility, counter-mobility, survivability, and general engineering support
- Size: Battalion
- Part of: 35th Engineer Brigade
- Garrison/HQ: Cape Girardeau, Missouri
- Motto: Get It Done
- Engagements: War on terror; Operation Iraqi Freedom; Operation Spartan Shield; Operation Inherent Resolve

The 1140th Engineer Battalion is a combat engineer battalion that was stood up in 1967 and is a part of the 35th Engineer Brigade in the Missouri Army National Guard, located in Cape Girardeau, Missouri.

== History ==
The 1140th Engineer Battalion traces its lineage to Missouri National Guard infantry formations that were active prior to the Second World War. As the Army restructured to meet new unit requirements, these infantry elements were reorganized and changed into engineer forces and eventually creating the 1140th Engineer Battalion in 1967.

During the Gulf War of 1990–1991, elements of the battalion were mobilized for duty in Southwest Asia, providing combat engineer support to coalition forces. Soldiers were tasked with constructing and reinforcing defensive positions, improving mobility routes, and maintaining base infrastructure in the area.

After the September 11 terrorist attacks, the 1140th again mobilized throughout the Middle East, with soldiers deploying in support of the Global War on Terror. Companies and detachments of the battalion served in Iraq during Operation Iraqi Freedom. They improved roads and helped with the removal of IED's set up on roadsides. Even after returning home, in the weeks/days after, the unit was sent to help with Hurricane Katrina, clearing debris. They also helped raise the levee.

Others deployed to Afghanistan under Operation Enduring Freedom, where they provided engineer support which included road improvement, survivability positions, and explosive hazard reduction along with previous missions-set's from Iraq of asphalt and building construction, by June 2012 of their deployment, the engineer battalion had removed 95 explosive devices from what is arguably the most kinetic area in Afghanistan.

In more recent years, the battalion has contributed engineer detachments to Operation Spartan Shield in the Middle East, providing construction building and support to U.S. and coalition forces across the region

The 1140th helped out with major disasters such as the Great Flood of 1993, soldiers of the battalion worked to reinforce levees, assist evacuations, and protect communities from the floodwaters, the Missouri River floods of 2007, 2011, 2017, and 2019, when companies again created and helped levee repair, sandbag operations, and debris clearance.

In May 2011, after an EF-5 tornado tore through Joplin, engineers of the 1140th were among the first National Guard forces on the scene, providing security support and clearing debris from neighborhoods and critical infrastructure.

== Organization ==
The 1140th Engineer Battalion consists of the following subordinate units:

- 1140th Engineer Battalion, in Cape Girardeau
  - Headquarters and Headquarters Company, 1140th Engineer Battalion, in Cape Girardeau
  - Forward Support Company, 1140th Engineer Battalion, in Cape Girardeau
  - 220th Engineer Company (Engineer Construction Company), in Festus
  - 1138th Engineer Company (Combat Engineer Company — Infantry), in Farmington
  - 1438th Engineer Company (Multirole Bridge), in Macon
    - Detachment 1, 1438th Engineer Company (Multirole Bridge), in Moberly
