= Operation Spartan Shield =

United States Army Central operation in the Middle East

- Part of Operation Spartan Shield
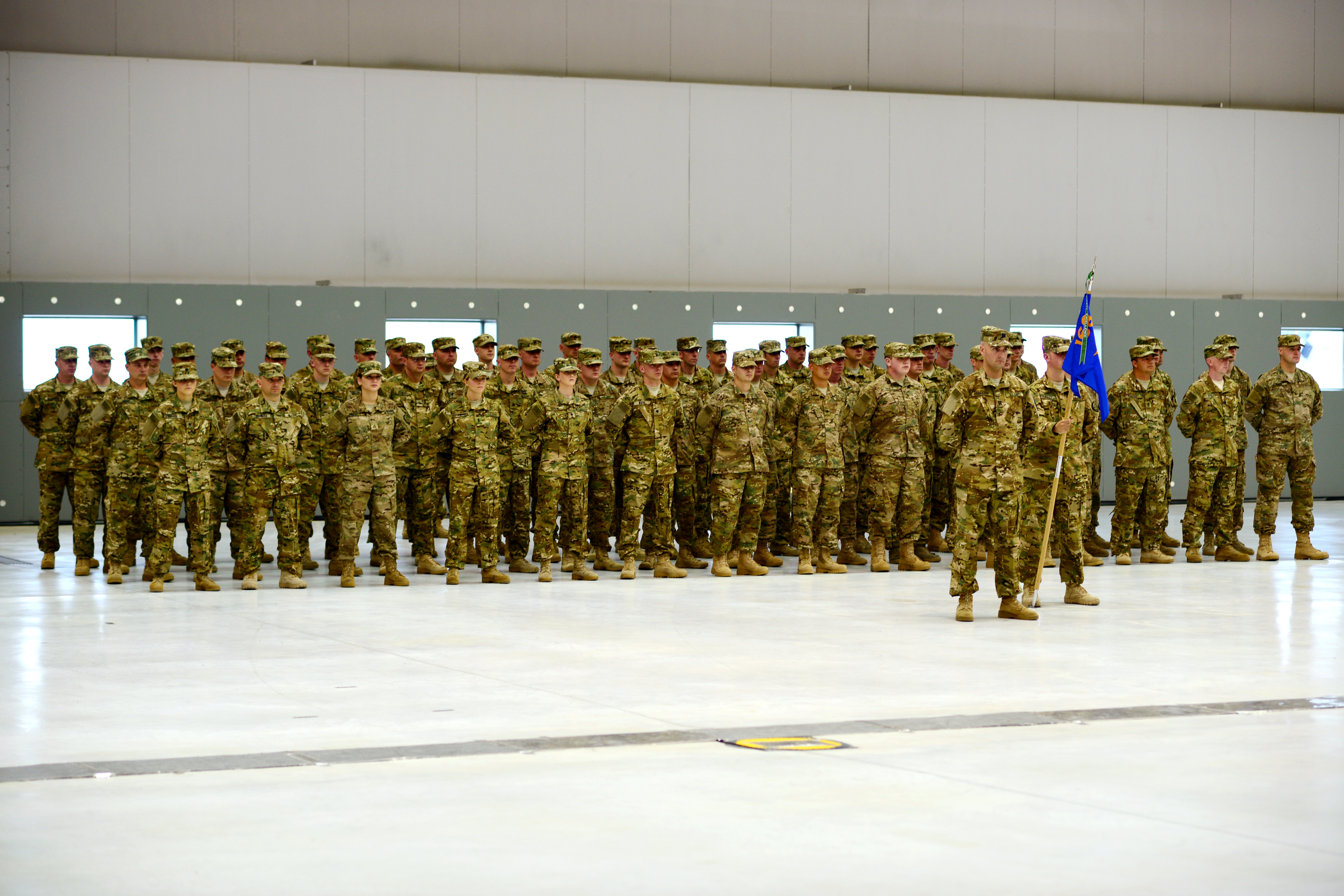
- Oregon Army National Guard Soldiers of 1st Battalion, 168th Aviation Regiment, stand in formation during a mobilization ceremony ahead of being deployed to Kuwait as part of Operation Spartan Shield in 2015
- Location: Prince Sultan Air Base, Saudi Arabia, Jordan-NJTC/Muwaffaq Salti Air Base (MSAB), various bases in Iraq
- Date: September 2012 – present

Operation Spartan Shield (OSS) is a United States Central Command operation in the Middle East. OSS is commanded by United States Army Central and includes units from all service branches. Task Force Spartan is the U.S. Army component of OSS.

On 19 December 2016, the 29th Infantry Division (United States) assumed command of U.S. Army Central's intermediate division headquarters, Task Force Spartan, at Camp Arifjan, Kuwait. This deployment includes 450 Virginia, Maryland and North Carolina Army National Guard soldiers and is the first time the 29th Infantry Division has been a part of the Third Army since World War II.

More than 80 members of the 29th deployed to Jordan in August 2016 where they assumed command of the military's joint operations center there to support Operation Inherent Resolve. Soldiers of the 29th led engagements and joint training with the Jordan Armed Forces and allied countries before returning in July 2017.

The 408th Contracting Support Brigade supports contracting requirements for Operation Spartan Shield, described in Army Lawyer as "USARCENT's steady state operation to Build Partner Capacity [that is, to conduct Capacity building) in the Middle East."

In Syria, on 25 August 2020, a Russian vehicle allegedly rammed a U.S. Mine Resistant Ambush Protected (MRAP) vehicle, resulting in a U.S. Army (Operation Spartan Shield) response.

== Units ==
Divisional Headquarters

- 4th Infantry Division until 2016
- 29th Infantry Division from November 2016 – July 2017.
- 35th Infantry Division from July 2017 – March 2018
- 28th Infantry Division from March 2018 – November 2018.
- 34th Infantry Division from November 2018 – July 2019.
- 38th Infantry Division from July 2019 – March 2020.
- 42nd Infantry Division from March 2020 – November 2020.
- 36th Infantry Division from November 2020 – July 2021.
- 29th Infantry Division from July 2021 – March 2022.
- 35th Infantry Division from March 2022 – November 2022.
- 28th Infantry Division from November 2022 – July 2023.
- 40th Infantry Division from July 2023 – March 2024
- 34th Infantry Division from March 2024 – December 2024.
- 38th infantry Division from December 2024 – July 2025
- 42nd infantry Division from July 2025 – June 2026.
- 36th Infantry Division from June 2026 – Present.

Commands

- 3rd Sustainment Command (Expeditionary) from August 2021 to May 2022

Combat Brigades

- 2nd Brigade Combat Team, 1st Armored Division, was in Kuwait, now in Syria September 2020, to protect the troops there.
- 155th Armored Brigade Combat Team, From June 2018 – March 2019.
- 69th Air Defense Artillery Brigade
- 31st Air Defense Artillery Brigade, From March 2022 – February 2023
- 30th Armored Brigade Combat Team, From Oct. 2019 – May 2020. Posted to Syria in late October for one month.
- 75th Field Artillery Brigade from July 2020.

Support Brigades

- 194th Theater Engineer Brigade from Oct 2019 to Aug 2020
- 16th Theater Engineer Brigade from Aug 2020 to Apr 2021
- 111th Theater Engineer Brigade from Apr 2021 to Nov 2021
- 372nd Theater Engineer Brigade from Nov 2021 to Jul 2022
- 926th Theater Engineer Brigade from Jul 2022 to Apr 2023
- 16th Theater Engineer Brigade from Mar 2025 to Dec 2025
- 117th Theater Engineer Brigade from Dec 2025 to Current
- 7th Transportation Brigade

Battalions

- 682nd Engineer Battalion HHC 2015-2016(MN)
- 319th Expeditionary Signal Battalion, 505th Tactical Theater Signal Brigade, 335th Theater Signal Command from September 2021 to TBD
- 156th Expeditionary Signal Battalion, 177th Military Police Brigade, 335th Theater Signal Command from May 2022 to TBD
- 3rd Ordnance Battalion (EOD)(Task Force Hell Hound) from April 2020
- 198th Expeditionary Signal Battalion from August 2019 – July 2020
- 146th Expeditionary Signal Battalion from June 2020 – TBD
- 129th Combat Sustainment Support Battalion, 101st Division Sustainment Brigade, 101st Airborne Division from April 2019 to December 2019.
- 87th Combat Sustainment Support Battalion, 3rd Infantry Division Sustainment Brigade, 3rd Infantry Division from December 2019 to October 2020.
- 1st Battalion, 501st Airborne Infantry Regiment, 4th Brigade Combat Team (Airborne), 25th Infantry Division from August 2017 to July 2018
- 130th Engineer Battalion from October 2025 to Current
- 3rd Squadron 278th ACR, 36th Infantry division from July 2025 to February 2026

Other units

- 203d Inland Cargo Transfer Company, 457th Transportation Battalion, 644th Regional Support Group from December 2020 to August 2021
- 1st Squadron, 102nd Cavalry Regiment, March 2019-Nov 2019
- D Forward Support Company (D FSC), 141st Brigade Support Battalion, 1st Squadron, 303rd Cavalry Regiment between November 2019 and July 2020
- 352nd Civil Affairs Command (Forward), also known as, Civil Affairs Planning Team (CAPT), from July 2015 to present (?). Attached to Army Central Command Headquarters (ARCENT), Camp Arifjan, Kuwait. Other units'
- 203d Inland Cargo Transfer Company, 457th Transportation Battalion, 644th Regional Support Group from December 2020 to August 2021
- 1st Squadron, 102nd Cavalry Regiment, March 2019-Nov 2019
- D Forward Support Company (D FSC), 141st Brigade Support Battalion, 1st Squadron, 303rd Cavalry Regiment between November 2019 and July 2020
- 352nd Civil Affairs Command (Forward), also known as, Civil Affairs Planning Team (CAPT), from July 2015 to present (?). Attached to Army Central Command Headquarters (ARCENT), Camp Arifjan, Kuwait.
- 626th Maintenance Company, 630th Combat Sustainment Support Battalion, 113th Sustainment Brigade between October 2019 and July 2020
- 3666th Support Maintenance Company, 158th Combat Sustainment Support Battalion, 198th Regional Support Group "Desert Demons", Arizona Army National Guard, July 2020 to March 2021.
- 228th Combat Support Hospital, 176th Medical Brigade, 807th Medical Command (Deployment Support) from September 2020 to Present
- Patrol Forces Southwest Asia (PATFORSWA) Combined Task Force 55.1, U.S. Coast Guard from September 2012 – present
- A Company, 1st Battalion, 157th Infantry Regiment, Colorado Army National Guard, January 2021-November 2021.
- 626th Maintenance Company, 630th Combat Sustainment Support Battalion, 113th Sustainment Brigade between October 2019 and July 2020
- 3666th Support Maintenance Company, 158th Combat Sustainment Support Battalion, 198th Regional Support Group "Desert Demons", Arizona Army National Guard, July 2020 to March 2021.
- 228th Combat Support Hospital, 176th Medical Brigade, 807th Medical Command (Deployment Support) from September 2020 to Present
- Patrol Forces Southwest Asia (PATFORSWA) Combined Task Force 55.1, U.S. Coast Guard from September 2012 – present
- A Company, 1st Battalion, 157th Infantry Regiment, Colorado Army National Guard, January 2021-November 2021.
- B Company, 31st Combat Support Hospital, 61st Medical Battalion, 1st Medical Brigade, June 2016 - May 2017

== Aviation units ==
- 35th Combat Aviation Brigade, Missouri Army National Guard, Aug 2012 – Apr 2013.
- 4th Battalion, 501st Aviation Regiment (Combat Aviation Brigade, 35th Infantry Division) during March 2013.
- 36th Combat Aviation Brigade, Texas Army National Guard, Apr – Dec 2013.
- 42d Combat Aviation Brigade, New York Army National Guard, Dec 2013 – Aug 2014
- 2nd Battalion, 135th Aviation Regiment (UH-60) from May 2015.
- 1st Battalion (General Support), 168th Aviation Regiment (CH-47) between October 2015 and August 2016 (Combat Aviation Brigade, 40th Infantry Division).
- 1st Battalion, 10th Aviation Regiment from April 2016.
- Company D, 1st Battalion, 140th Aviation Regiment (UH-60) from April 2016.
- Company A (AH-64 & UH-60), B, & D, 1st Battalion, 111th Aviation Regiment (CH-47) between February and October 2016 (77th Combat Aviation Brigade).
- 2nd Battalion (General Support), 149th Aviation Regiment (CH-47) from February 2017.
- Company C, 2d Battalion (General Support), 211th Aviation Regiment attached to 1st Battalion (Assault Helicopter), 108th Aviation Regiment (Combat Aviation Brigade, 35th Infantry Division) during December 2018.
