= 39th Brigade Support Battalion =

- 39th Infantry Brigade Combat Team
- Country: United States
- Branch: Arkansas Army National Guard
- Garrison/HQ: Hazen, Arkansas
- Motto: Providers Never Fail
- Anniversaries: 2 November 1967
- Engagements: Iraq Campaign

Commanders
- Battalion Commander: Charles V. Lucas

Insignia
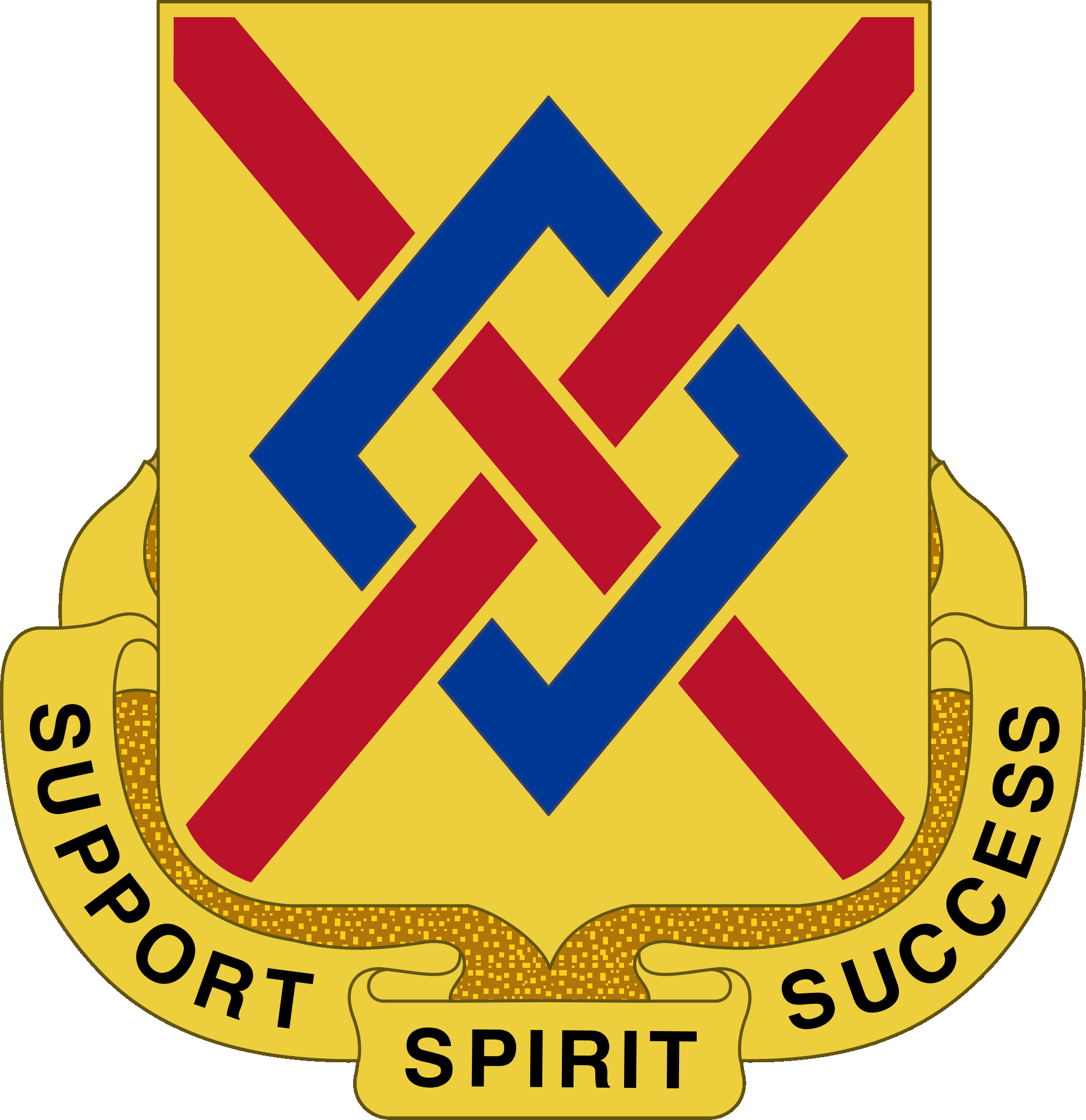
- 39th BSB's Distinctive Unit Insignia

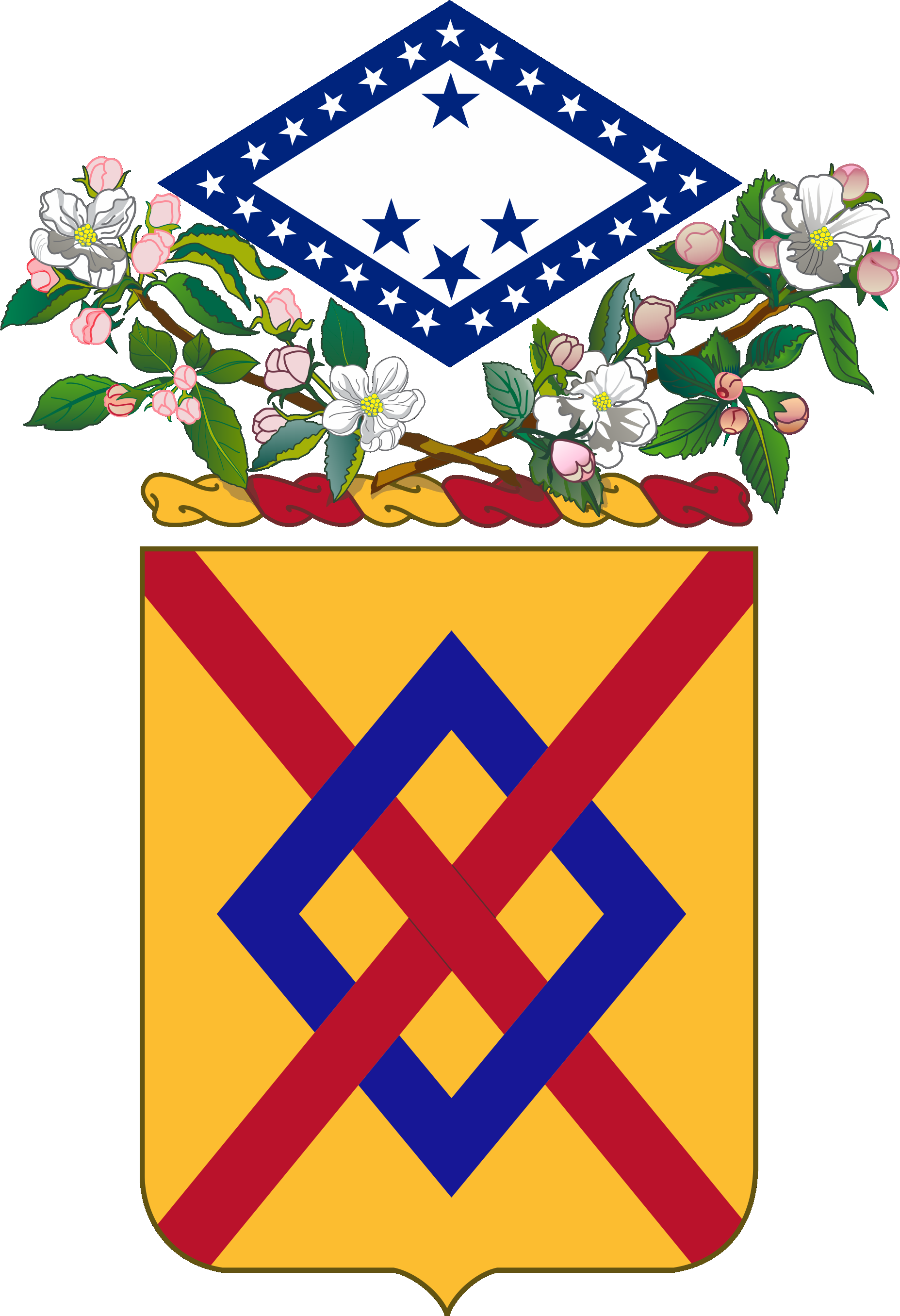
- 39th BSB's Coat of Arms

39th Brigade Support Battalion (39th BSB) is an element of the 39th Infantry Brigade Combat Team (IBCT), of the Arkansas Army National Guard. The battalion is headquartered at Hazen, Arkansas. The 39th Support Battalion was constituted on 2 November 1967 from existing units in central Arkansas and assigned to the 39th Infantry Brigade with headquarters in Hazen. Headquarters and Headquarters Battery, 2nd Battalion, 206th Field Artillery Regiment, at Hazen was reorganized and re-designated as the Headquarters and Headquarters Company, 39th Support Battalion.

== Organization ==
The battalion originally comprised five companies: Headquarters and Headquarters Detachment (HHD) in Hazen; Company A (Admin) at Ricks Armory in Little Rock; Company B (Medical) in Lonoke with a detachment in DeWitt; Company C (Transportation) in Stuttgart with a detachment in Hazen; and Company D (Maintenance) in Perryville with a detachment at Fisher Armory in North Little Rock. In 1996, the unit reorganized into only four companies: Headquarters and Headquarters Company (HHC), Company A (Supply & Transportation), Company B (Maintenance), and Company C (Medical). In 2005, the battalion reorganized again into the 39th Brigade Support Battalion (39th BSB) and currently consists of eight companies: Headquarters and Headquarters Company (HHC), Company A (Distribution), Company B (Field Maintenance), Company C (Medical), Company D (RTSA Forward Support Company), Companies E & F (Infantry Forward Support Companies), and Company G (Field Artillery Forward Support Company). The Forward Support Companies (FSC) are task-organized to the battalion they habitually support, and they fall under the supported battalion's command and control with input from the 39th BSB Commander. Members of the unit supported a 2002 deployment in support of the Multinational Force and Observers mission in Egypt. The battalion has mobilized twice in support of Operation Iraqi Freedom, once in 2003–2005 and again 2007–2008.

== Mission ==
On order, the 39th Brigade Support Battalion will mobilize and deploy in order to plan and supervise logistics and combat health service support operations for the 39th Infantry Brigade Combat Team.

== History ==
Important events in the unit's early history include:

1972, HHD, 39th Support Battalion won the Hulen Trophy for marksmanship

1975, 39th Support Battalion supplied and re-supplied the 5–206th Field Artillery over a distance of twenty miles for two weeks using only air drops, a first for a reserve component support unit

2001, Several members of the 39th SB volunteered and deploy with 2nd Battalion, 153rd Infantry Regiment (2-153rd) in support of the Multi National Force and Observer (MFO) mission in the Sinai Peninsula, Egypt. 2–153rd was sent to Egypt in order to take over the Multinational Force and Observers mission, freeing up regular army infantry units to deploy to Afghanistan.

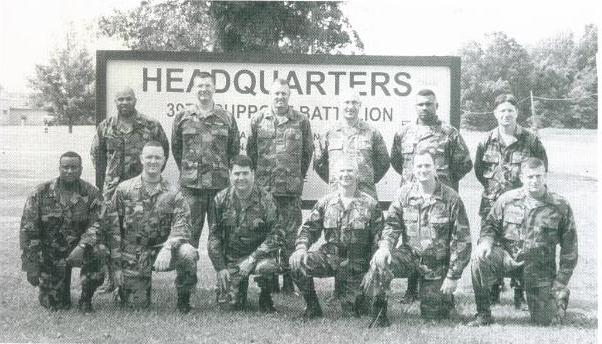
LTC Don Brooks and Staff, 2002

In 2003, a platoon from Company A mobilizes along with the 1123rd Transportation Company for Operation Iraqi Freedom.

=== Global War on Terrorism ===
Except for the deployment to Bosnia in 2000 in support of SFOR 09, members of the 39th BSB have participated in every mobilization the 39th IBCT has performed. In 1999, volunteers from Company A deployed with B/3-153rd Infantry to Saudi Arabia in support of Operation Southern Watch. In 2001, members of the HHC Property Book Section and several medics from Company C (Medical) along with a doctor deployed to the Sinai Peninsula in support of the Multinational Force Observers mission.

=== Operation Iraqi Freedom II ===
==== The ramp-up ====
In 2002, the 39th SB was notified that it would be participating in a rotation to the Joint Readiness Training Center (JRTC) at Fort Polk, LA along with the rest of the 39th Brigade. For National Guard units, a rotation to JRTC is a three-year process that provides additional money, resources and training opportunities in order to improve unit readiness before the actual rotation through the JRTC. The battalion was required to complete a Mission Rehearsal Exercise during the Annual Training 2003 which was conducted at Fort Chaffee Maneuver Training Center, Arkansas. Less than a month after the completion of this major training milestone, the 39th Support Battalion received its alert for deployment to Iraq in support of Operation Iraqi Freedom on 28 July 2003.

==== Alert, train, and man the battalion ====
On 12 October 2003, the 39th SB, commanded by LTC Allen P. Hargis, was ordered to federal service in support of Operation Iraqi Freedom II for a period of up to eighteen months. The battalion would undergo post mobilization training at Fort Hood, Texas, from October 2003 until January 2004. In January, the brigade shipped its vehicles and equipment to Iraq from Fort Hood, and then moved to Fort Polk for a Mission Rehearsal Exercise at the JRTC.

When the battalion received its alert, it was approximately 130 soldiers short of its authorized end strength. This shortage was due in part to soldiers who had not yet completed Basic Combat Training and Advanced Individual Training, and in part to the fact that many soldiers from Company A had deployed in 2002 with the 2–153rd Infantry and in 2003 with the 1123rd Transportation Company. National Guard Bureau met the battalion's need for additional soldiers by alerting the 1115th Transportation Company and elements of the 642nd Maintenance Company from the New Mexico Army National Guard to bring the 39th SB to its full deployment strength.

==== Operation Bowie Fury ====
The 39th Support Battalion was stationed at Camp Taji, Iraq. The battalion effectively conducted its doctrinal missions supporting the 39th Brigade Combat Team, and they performed numerous non-doctrinal missions. One such mission was running the Division Distribution Center in which they performed supply support for the entire 1st Cavalry Division. This mission is normally conducted by a Main Support Battalion. The 642nd Maintenance Company from the New Mexico Army National Guard under the command of the 39th Support Battalion also ran the 39th Brigade Internment Facility, an operation recognized at all levels from brigade to corps as the standard for all theatre detention facilities. These are just two examples of the non-doctrinal missions the "Providers" conducted over the course of the deployment that caused it to be recognized by the 1st Cavalry Division commander.

The Iraqi deployment did not come without cost. The 39th Support Battalion lost five soldiers to enemy contact. CPT Arthur "Bo" Felder, CW4 Patrick Kordsmeier, SSG Billy Joe Orton, and SSG Stacey Brandon died on 24 April 2004 as a result of an early morning rocket attack on Camp Taji, Iraq. 24 April was the highest single day casualty total for Arkansas soldiers since the Korean War. The attack actually consisted of two separate volleys of rockets, fired approximately 30 minutes apart. Members of the battalion had just emerged from the safety of their bunkers and were conducting accountability when the second volley of rockets slammed into a group standing just feet from a bunker door.

SGT Ronald Baker died on 13 October 2004 from wounds sustained from a Vehicle Borne Improvised Explosive Device near Balad, Iraq on 7 October 2004.

==== Redeployment ====
The 39th SB redeployed from Iraq, through Kuwait, in March 2005. The battalion demobilized at Fort Sill, Oklahoma.

=== Operation Katrina ===
On 28 August 2005, in the aftermath of Hurricane Katrina in New Orleans, Louisiana, the 39th Support Battalion was ordered to send six cargo trucks and twelve personnel to New Orleans to assist in evacuating the Veterans Affairs hospital. Not knowing what kind of conditions they would face, the battalion added a wrecker and a fuel truck (from the 35th Combat Aviation Brigade) to the mission and sent sixteen soldiers and eight vehicles to New Orleans. Each of the volunteer soldiers informed employers and loved ones upon notification of the mission, and within hours they departed Hazen via convoy at approximately 20:30 hours. Their orders were to drive the entire distance that night. If absolutely necessary, they were to stop and sleep, but there were hundreds of vets counting on their help. The convoy pressed on through the night, stopping every thirty or forty minutes to walk around and stay awake. They arrived at the staging area in Camp Beauregard at 04:30 the next day and began working around the clock to evacuate over 200 veterans. Some of the soldiers carried disabled vets on their backs down flights of stairs to load them on their 5-Ton trucks for evacuation.

In November 2005, the 39th Brigade was ordered to send a battalion task force to Louisiana to assist in more hurricane relief efforts. The task force was commanded by 2–153 IN and included a company-size element from the 39th Support Battalion. Elements of Task Force Arkansas remained in Louisiana through February 2006.

=== Reorganization as a brigade support battalion ===
Upon redeployment in 2005, the 39th Support Battalion immediately began a major reorganization that transformed the battalion into a brigade support battalion under the United States Army's new Modular Design. This redesign of the army was intended to make the force more easily deployable by making brigades more self-contained and less dependent on support organizations at the division level. Major changes for the 39th Support Battalion included activation of four new Forward Support Companies, D, E, F and G. Along with this reorganization came a significant re-stationing of several units within the state of Arkansas.

=== Operation Iraqi Freedom 08-09 ===
The 39th BSB did not deploy as a battalion for OIF 08-09, however its soldiers and several of its companies did:

Company A, 39th BSB was organized as a Convoy Security Company and was task organized under 1st Battalion, 153rd Infantry at Camp Liberty for Administrative Control (ADCON), but was under the Tactical Control (TACON) of the 168th Brigade Support Battalion.

Company D, 39th BSB was organized as a Convoy Security Company and was task organized under 1st Squadron, 151st Cavalry Regiment, at Talil Air Base.

Company F, 39th BSB was organized as a Convoy Security Company and was initially task organized under the 217th Brigade Support Battalion for training at Camp Shelby, Mississippi. In theatre, Company F remained under the Administrative Control of the 217th BSB, but was under the Tactical Control of the 142nd Corp Sustainment Support Battalion.

Company G, 39th BSB was also organized as a Convoy Security Company and was task organized under 1st Battalion, 206th Field Artillery at Camp Taji for Administrative Control (ADCON), but was under the Tactical Control (TACON) of the theater's then largest battalion, the 165th CSSB of the Louisiana National Guard, commanded by LTC Randall B. Bradford.

The battalion commander, LTC Ricky Miller, and his staff were incorporated into the 39th IBCT staff and assisted with the operation of the Base Defense Operations Center at Camp Victory, Baghdad.

=== Operation Enduring Freedom - TF Warrior ===
Many members 39th BSB attached to 1st Battalion 153rd Infantry, in support Operation Enduring Freedom - Horn of Africa. (OEF-HOA) 16-17

== Fallen soldiers ==
=== Operation Iraqi Freedom 2004–2005 ===
- Captain Arthur L. "Bo" Felder of Lewisville, Age 36. Killed in Action, 24 April 2004
- Chief Warrant Officer 4 Patrick W. Kordsmeier of North Little Rock, Age 49. Killed in Action, 24 April 2004
- Staff Sergeant Billy J. Orton of Carlisle, Age 41. Killed in Action, 24 April 2004
- Staff Sergeant Stacey C. Brandon of Hazen, Age 35. Killed in Action, 24 April 2004
- Sergeant Ronald Wayne Baker of Cabot, Age 34. Killed in Action, 13 October 2004

=== Operation Iraqi Freedom 2007-2008 ===
- Sergeant First Class Anthony L. Woodham of Rogers, Age 37. Noncombat Death, 5 July 2008

=== Provider Annual Training - Fort Chaffee 2016 ===
- Sergeant Sylvester B. Cline of Pine Bluff, Age 32. Training Incident, 14 June 2016

== Past commanders ==
The following soldiers have led the 39th Brigade Support Battalion:

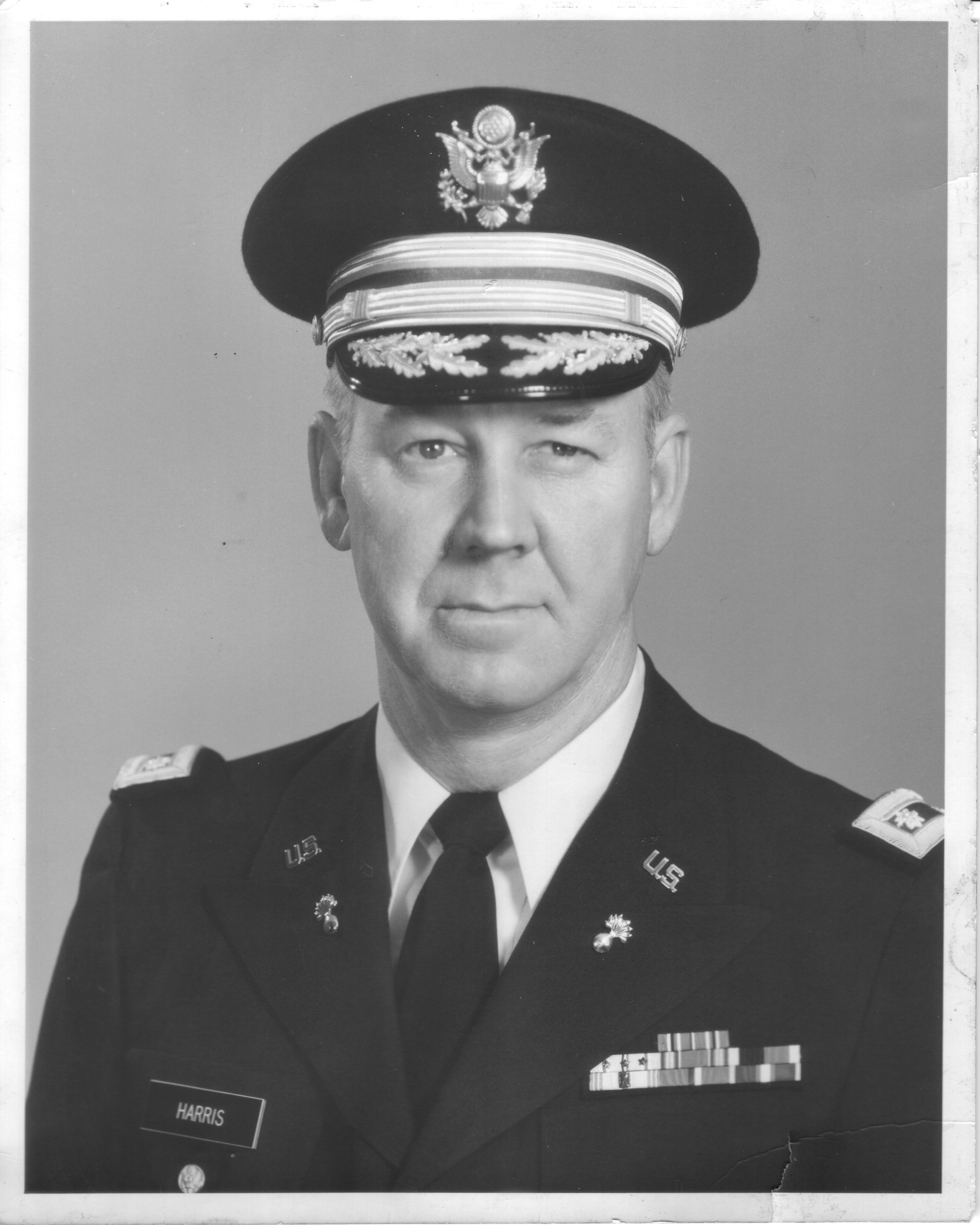
LTC Durwood F. Harris, 67 – 5 JAN 72

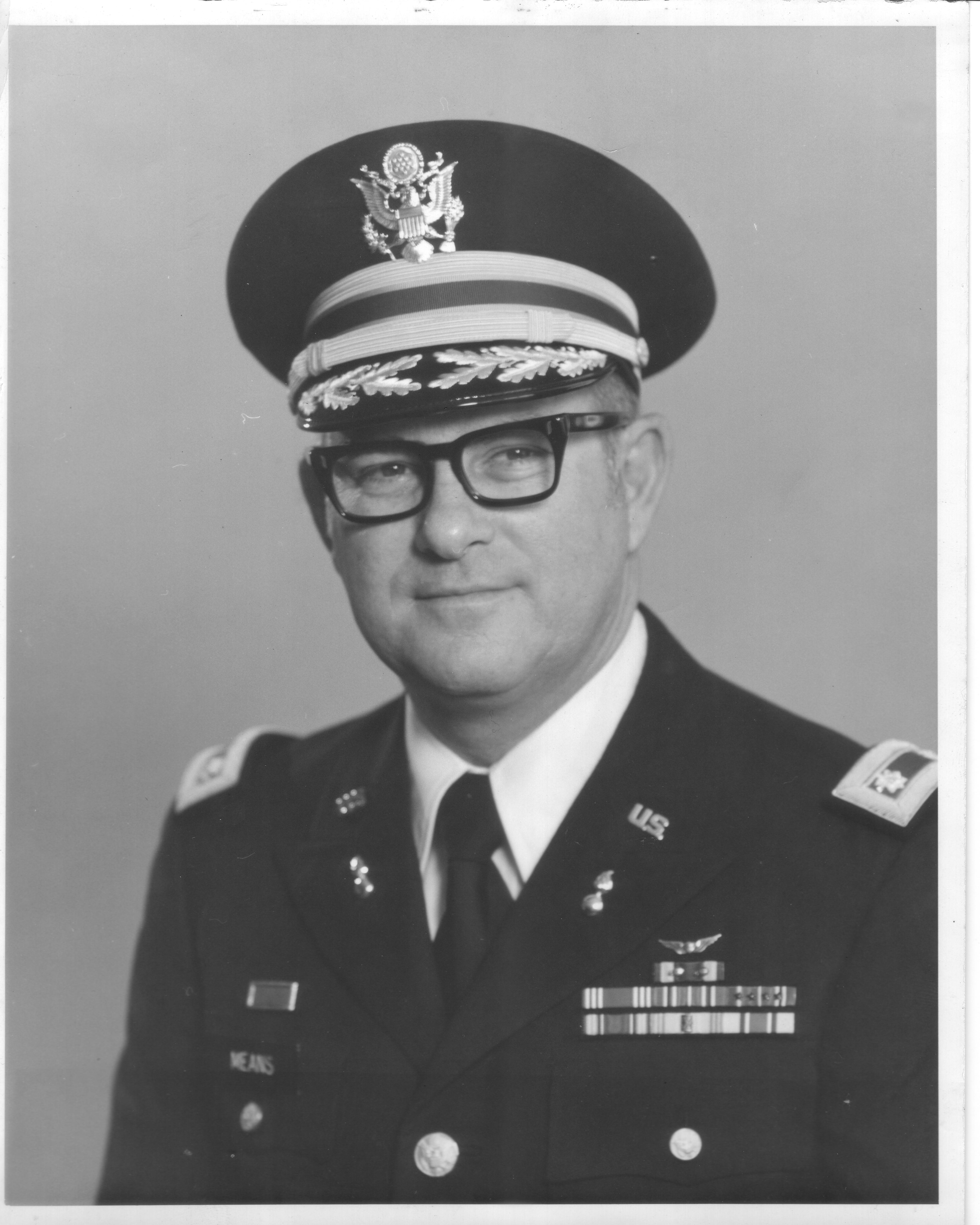
LTC Robert R. Means, 6 JAN 72 – 9 SEP 74

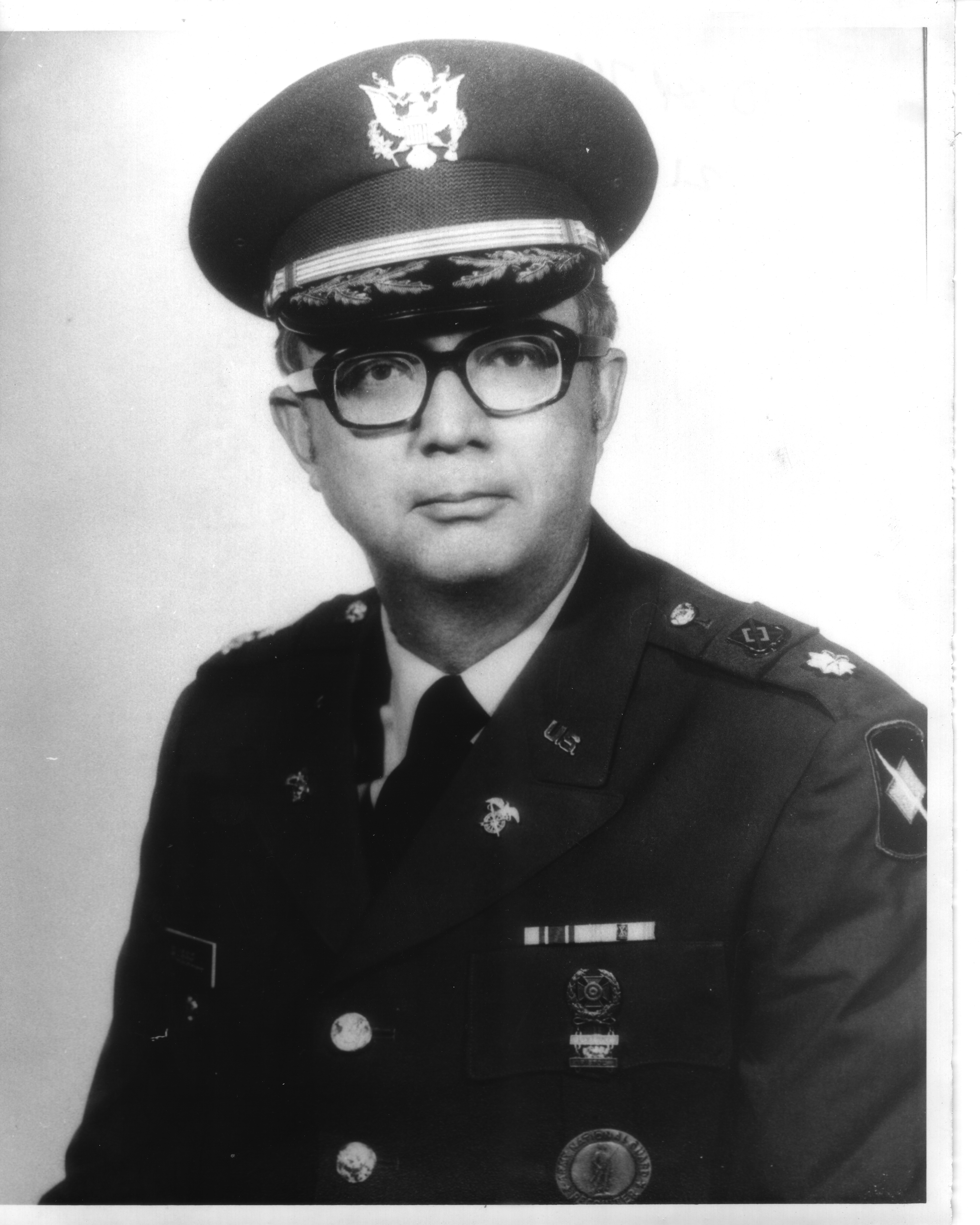
LTC Oscar G. Russell 10 SEP 74 – 21 NOV 76

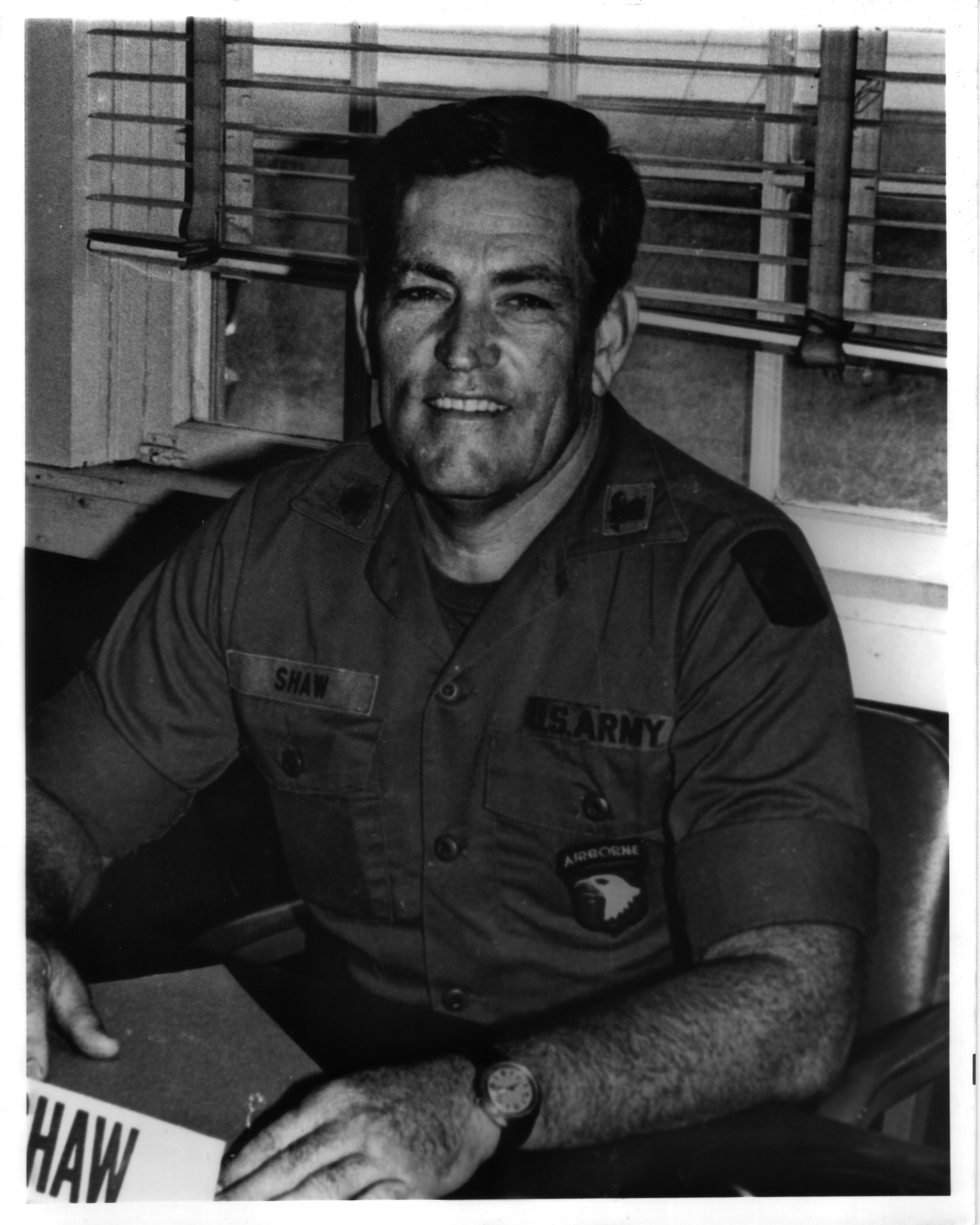
LTC Wallace B. Shaw, 22 NOV 76 – 10 AUG 79

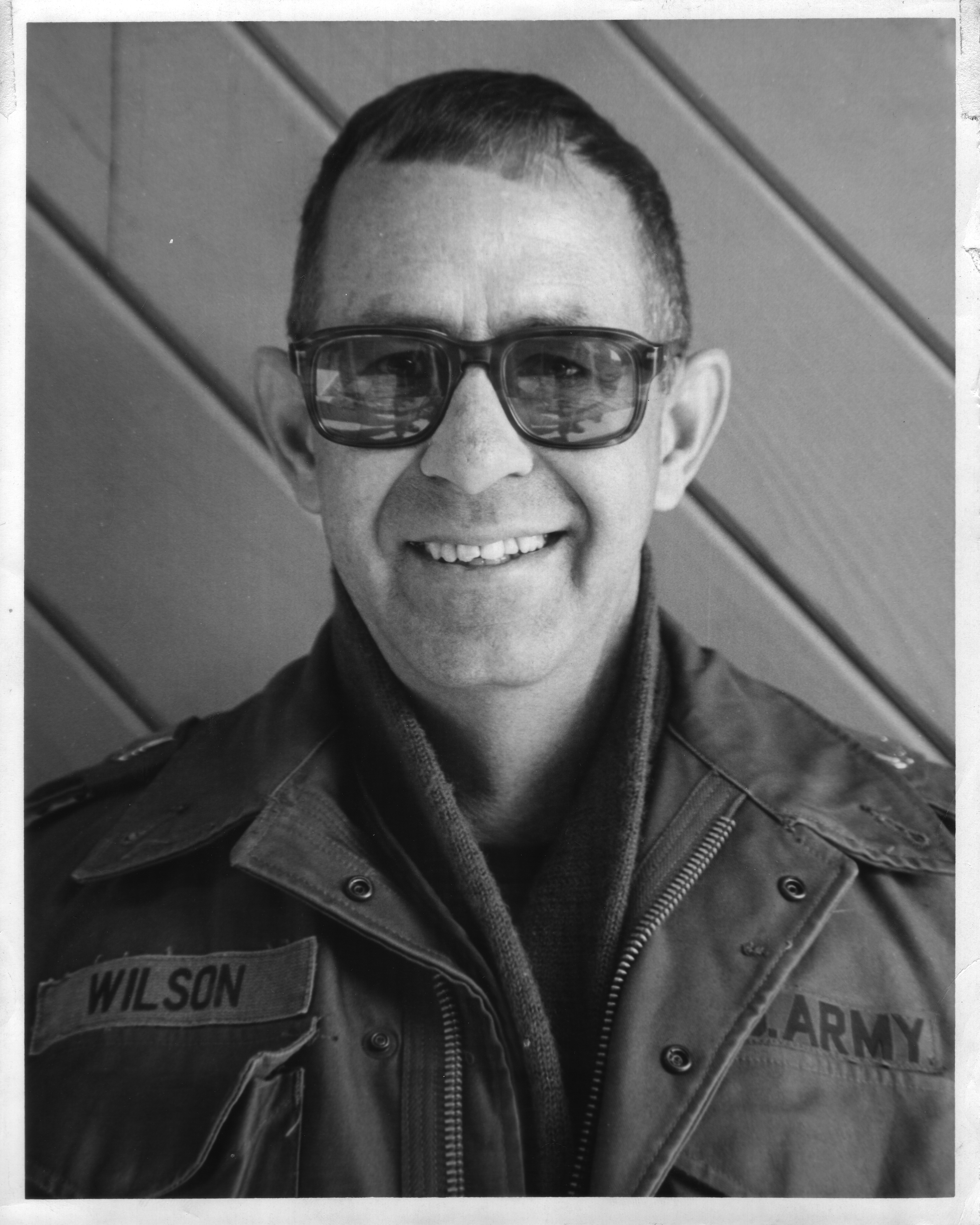
LTC Bobby D. Wilson, 11 AUG 79 – 30 OCT 81

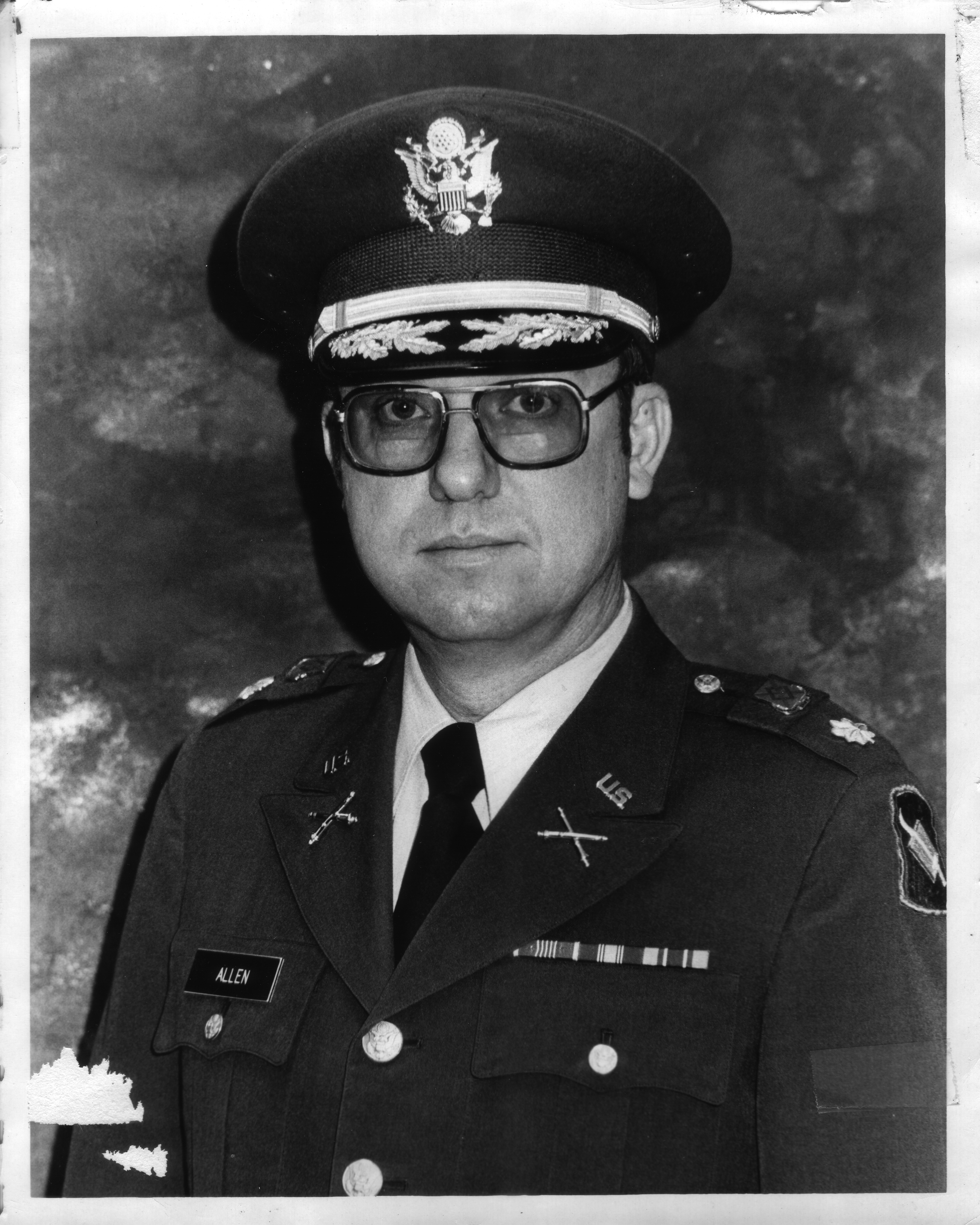
LTC Gerald S. Allen, 31 OCT 81 – 2 SEP 85

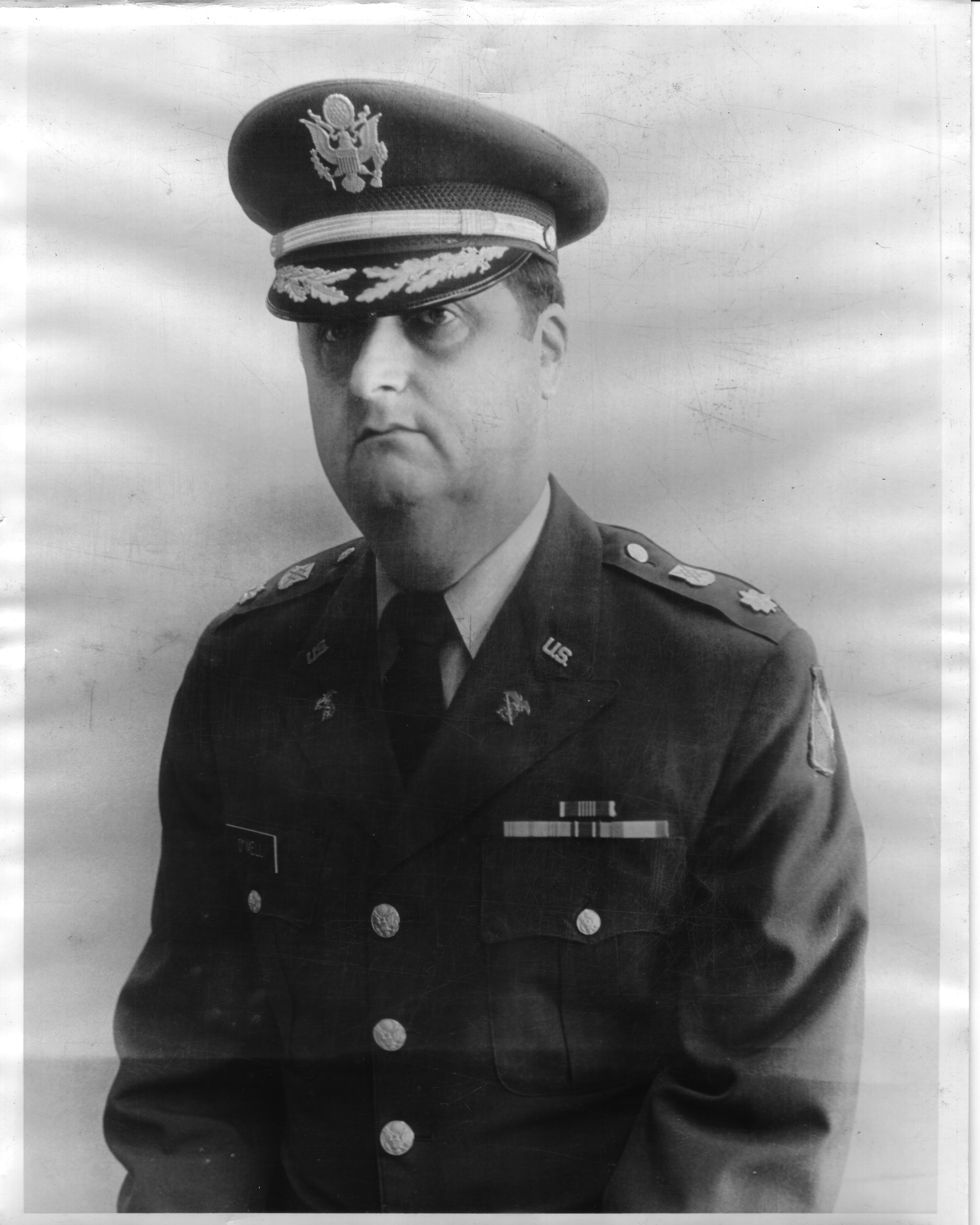
LTC Ronald M. O'Mell, 3 SEP 85 – 13 SEP 86

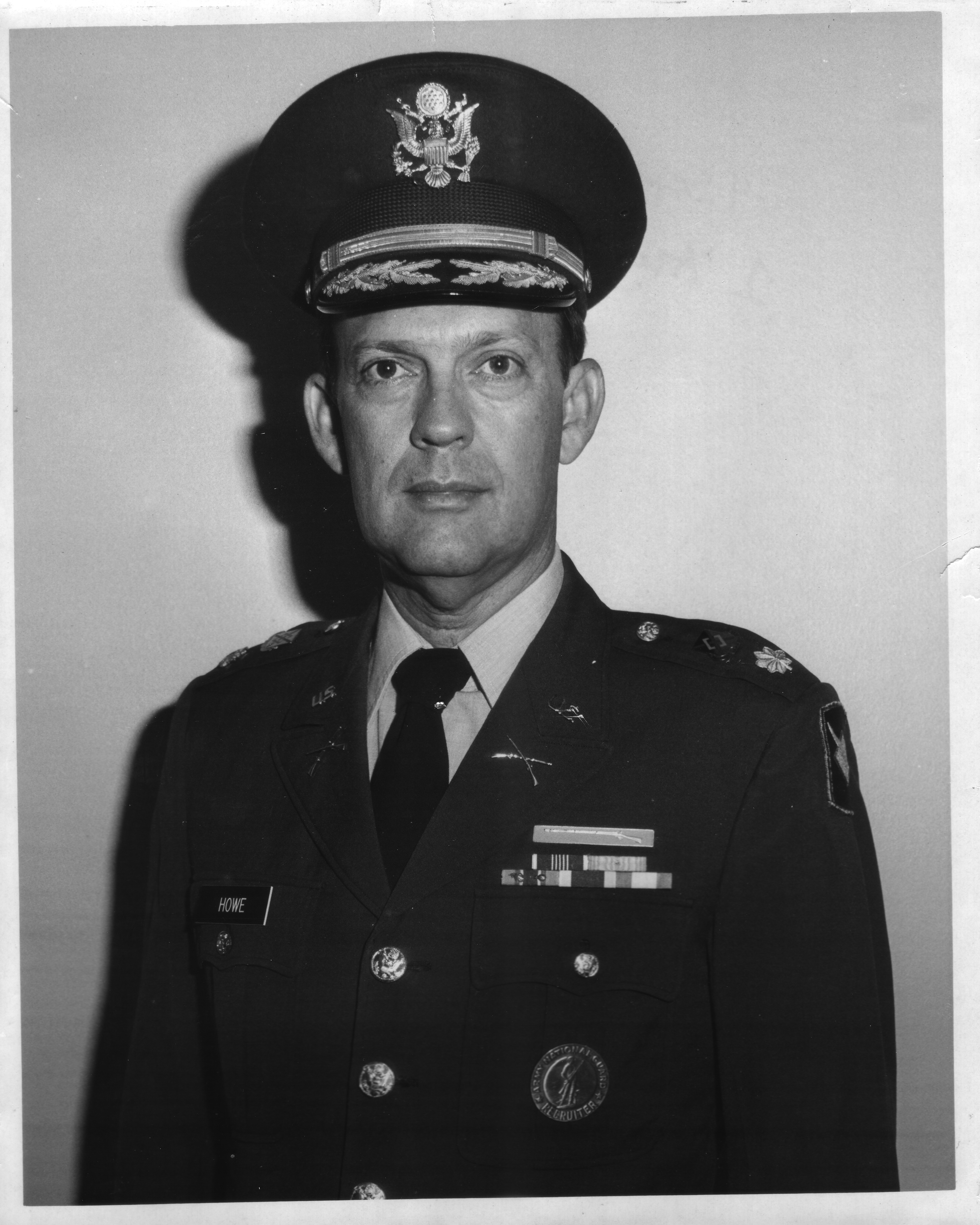
LTC B. Markham Howe, 14 SEP 86 – 1 AUG 88

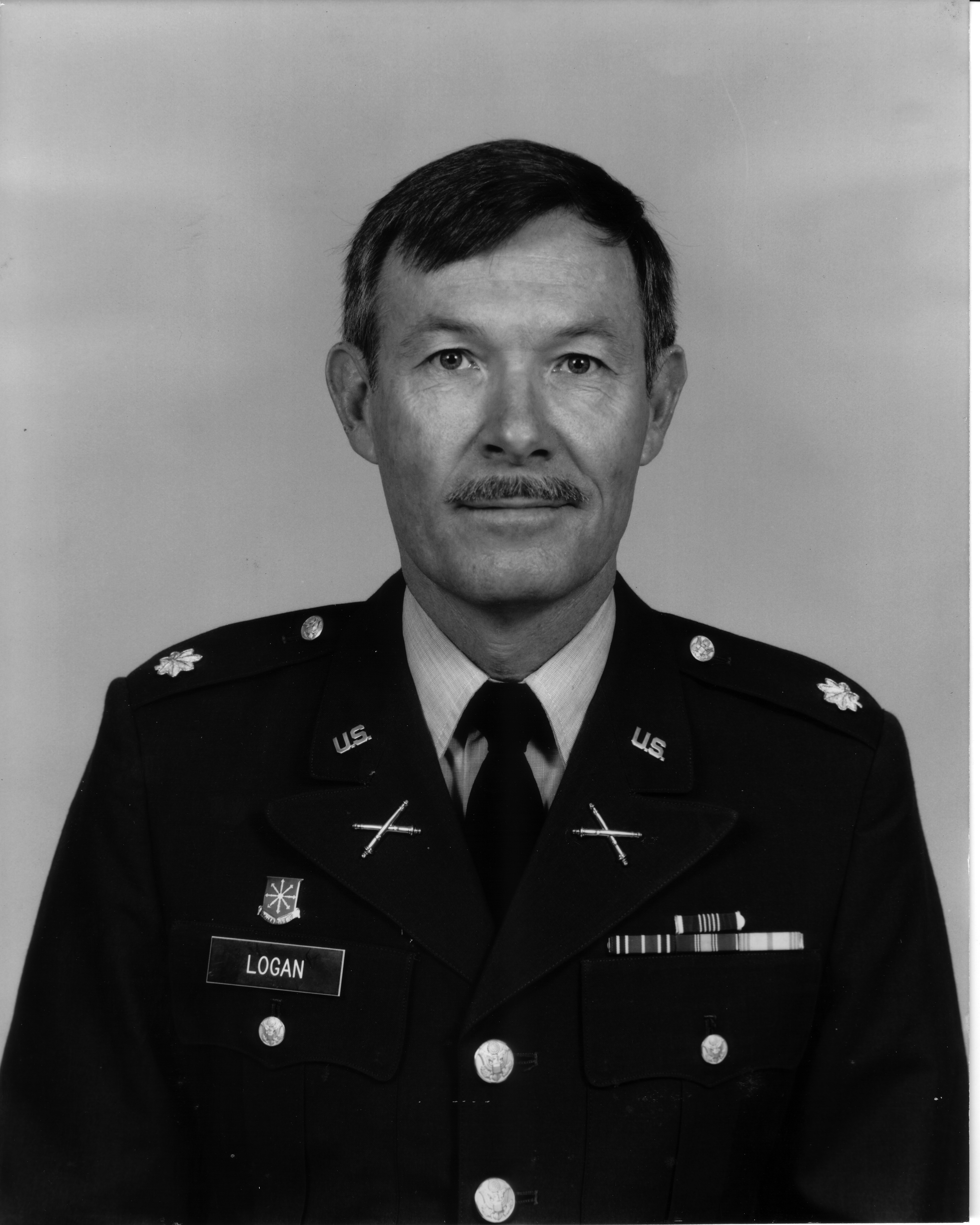
LTC Hubert H. Logan, 2 AUG 88 – 8 OCT 89

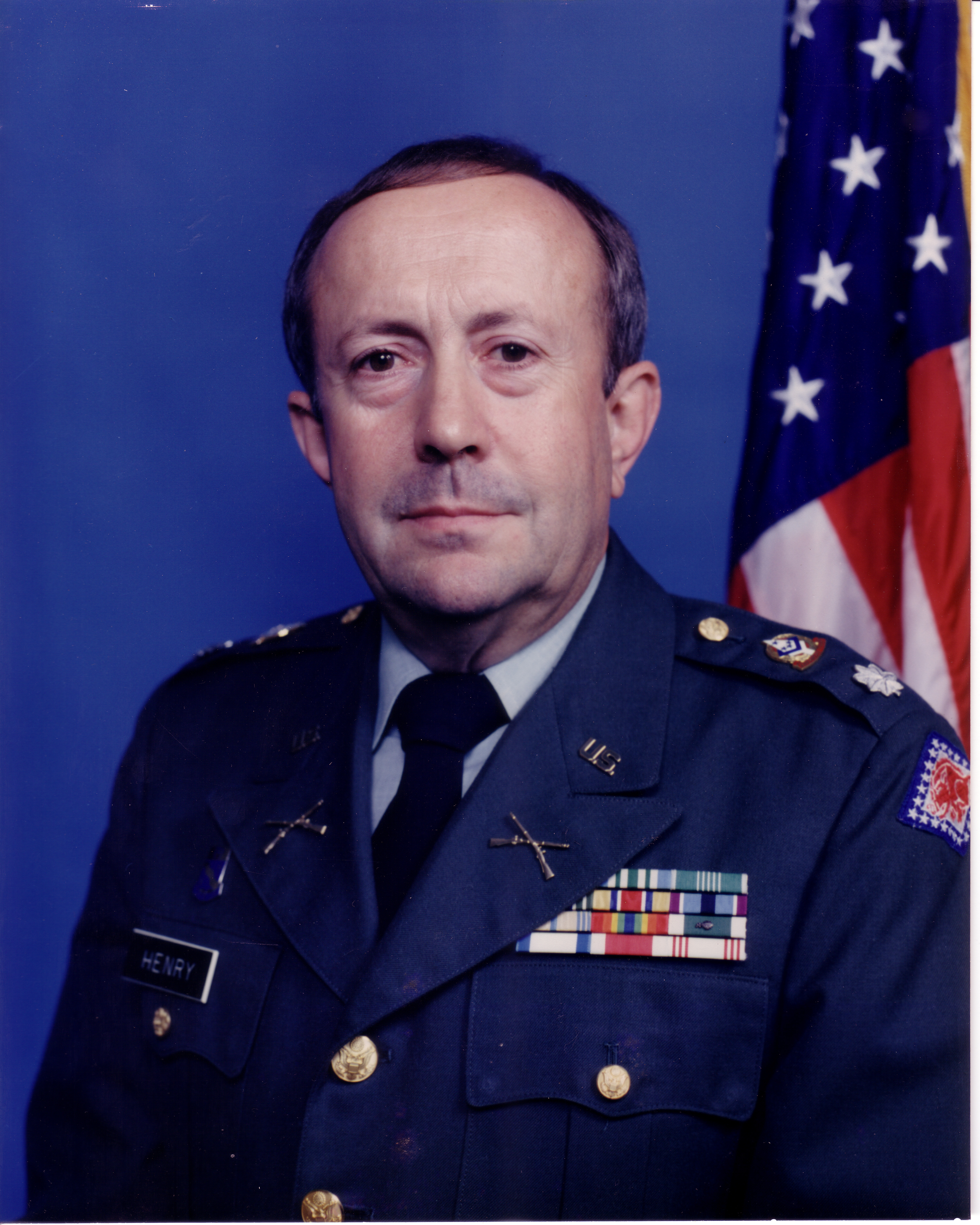
LTC Charles E. Henry, 9 OCT 89 – 8 JUL 91

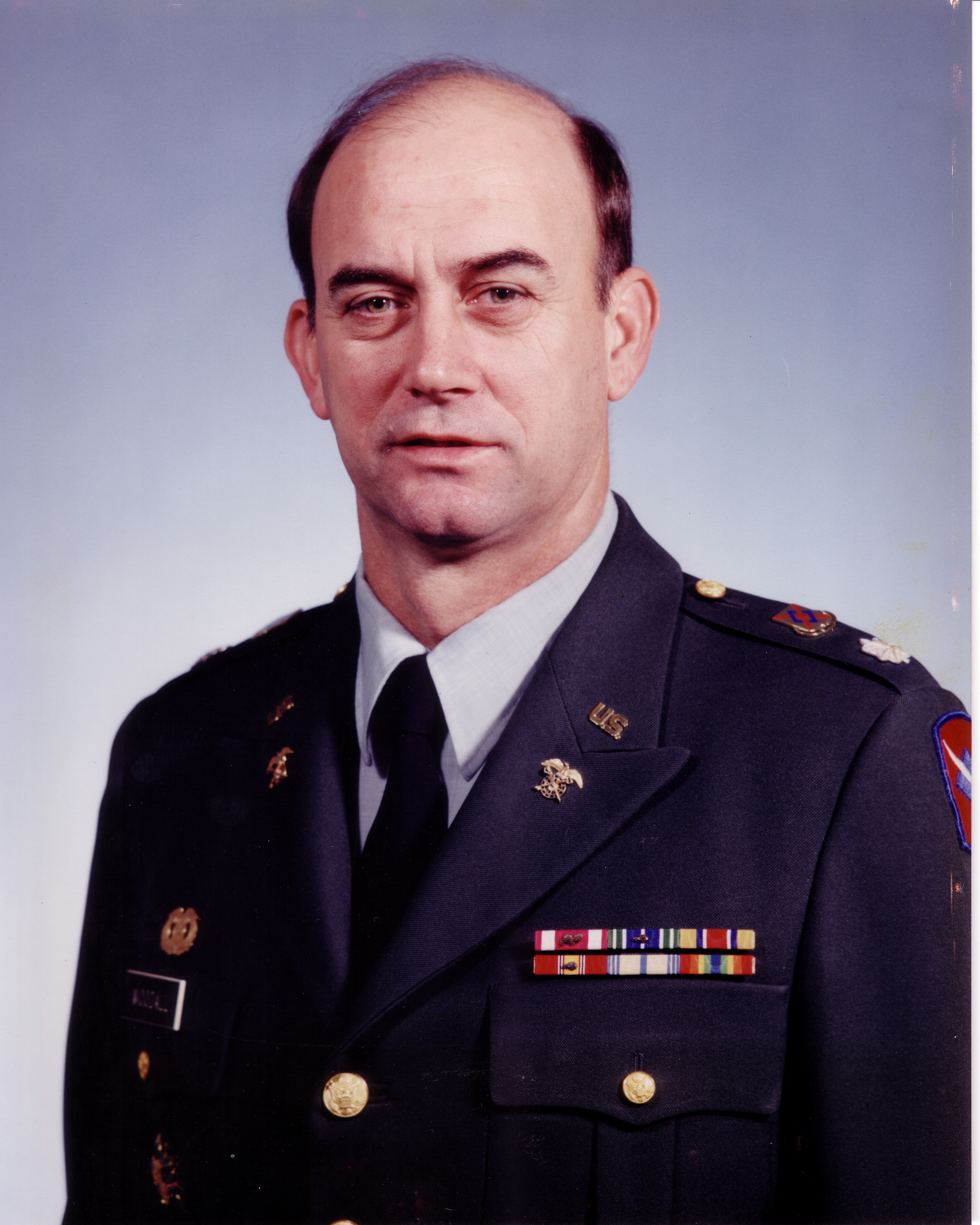
LTC Luther R. Woodall, 9 JUL 91 – 23 JUN 93

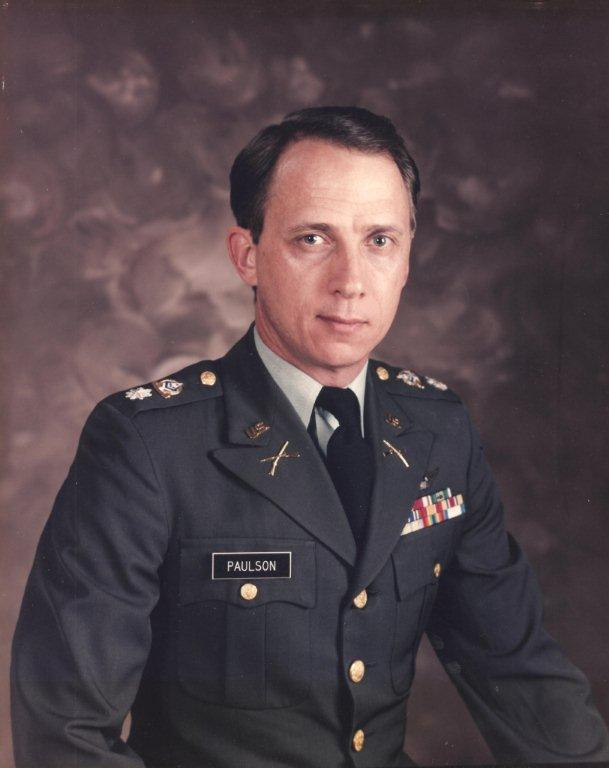
LTC Walter A. Paulson II, 24 JUN 93 – 24 JAN 94

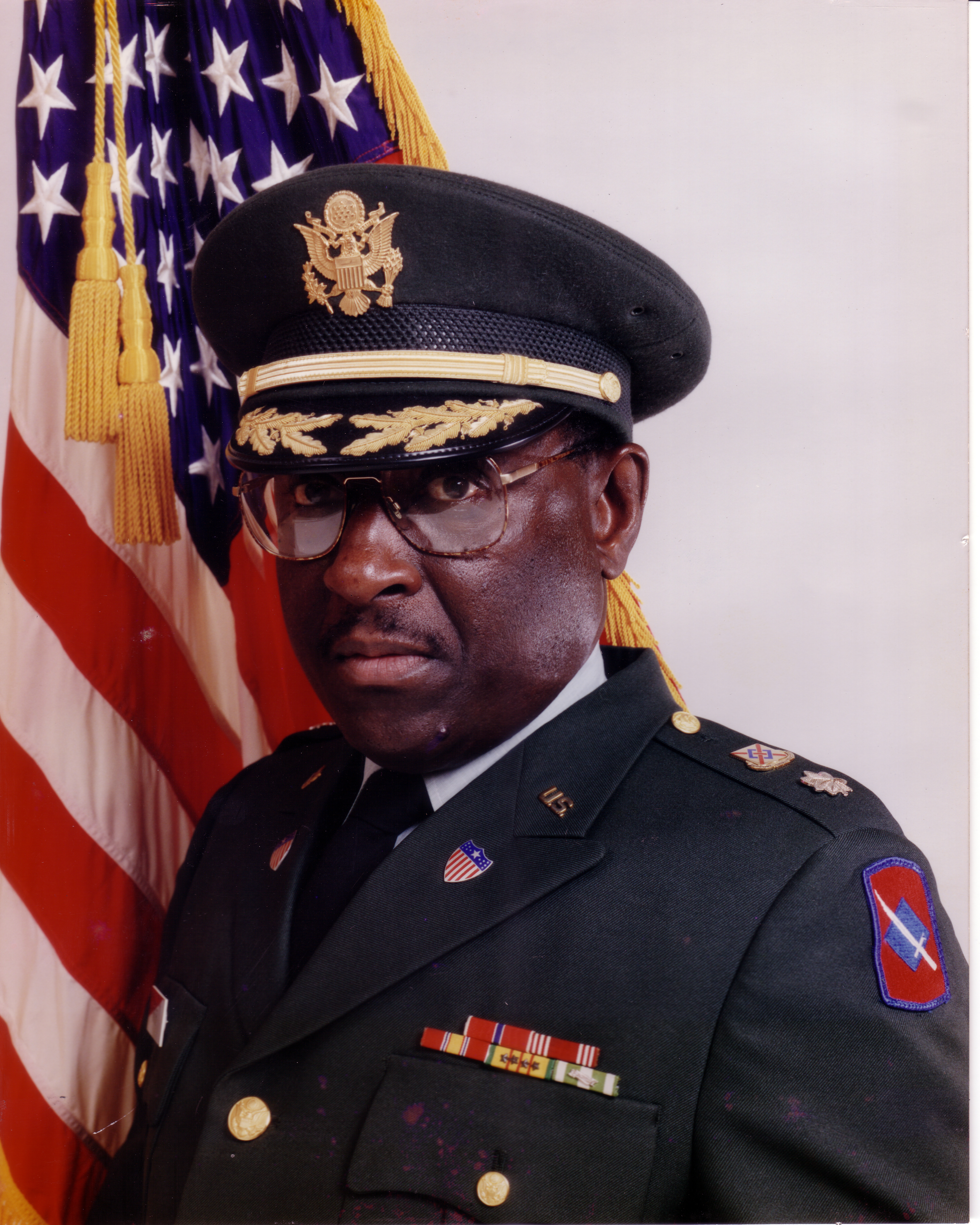
LTC Sherman E. Tate, 25 JAN 94 – 2 AUG 96

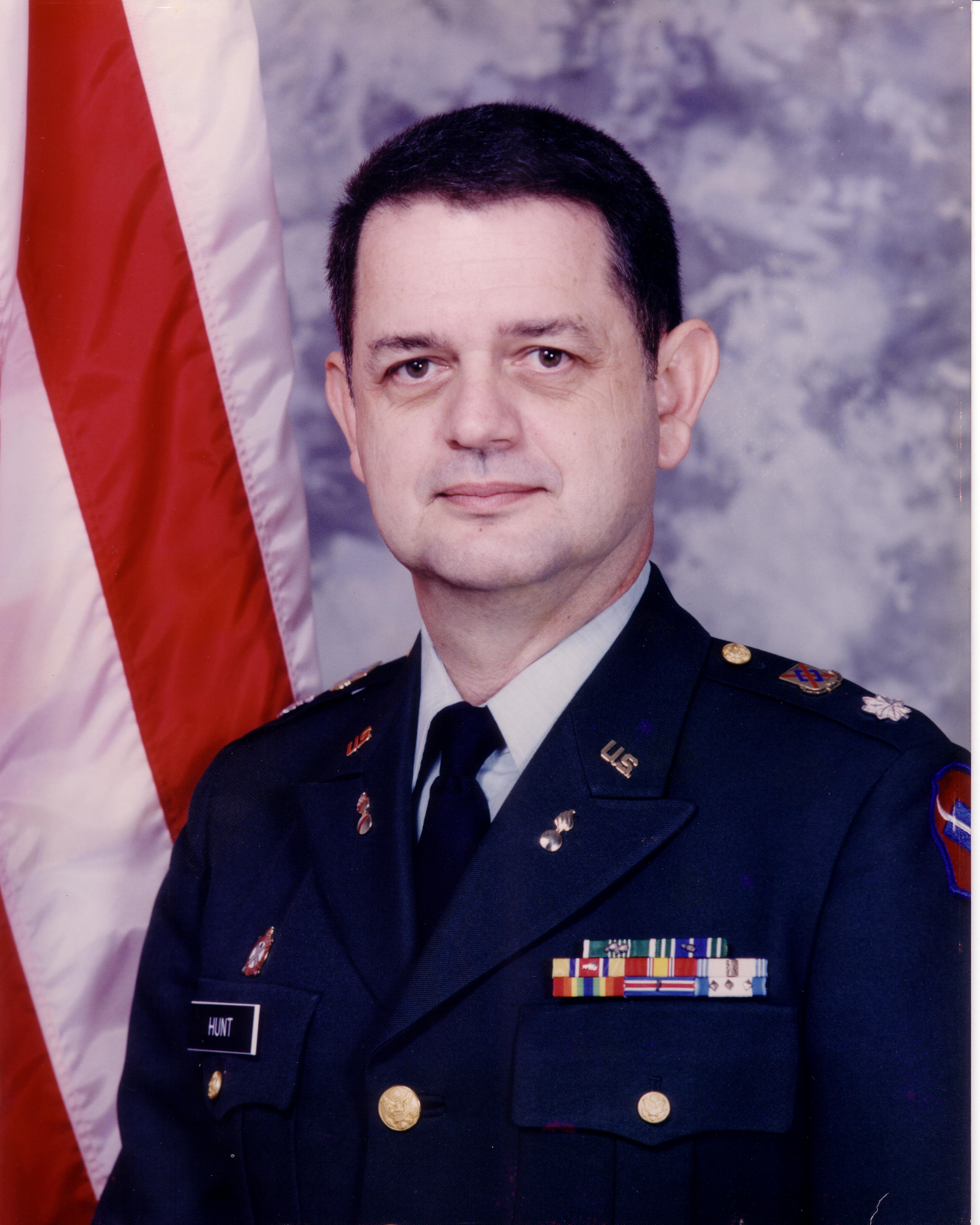
LTC Charles H. Hunt, Jr., 3 AUG 96 – 9 AUG 98

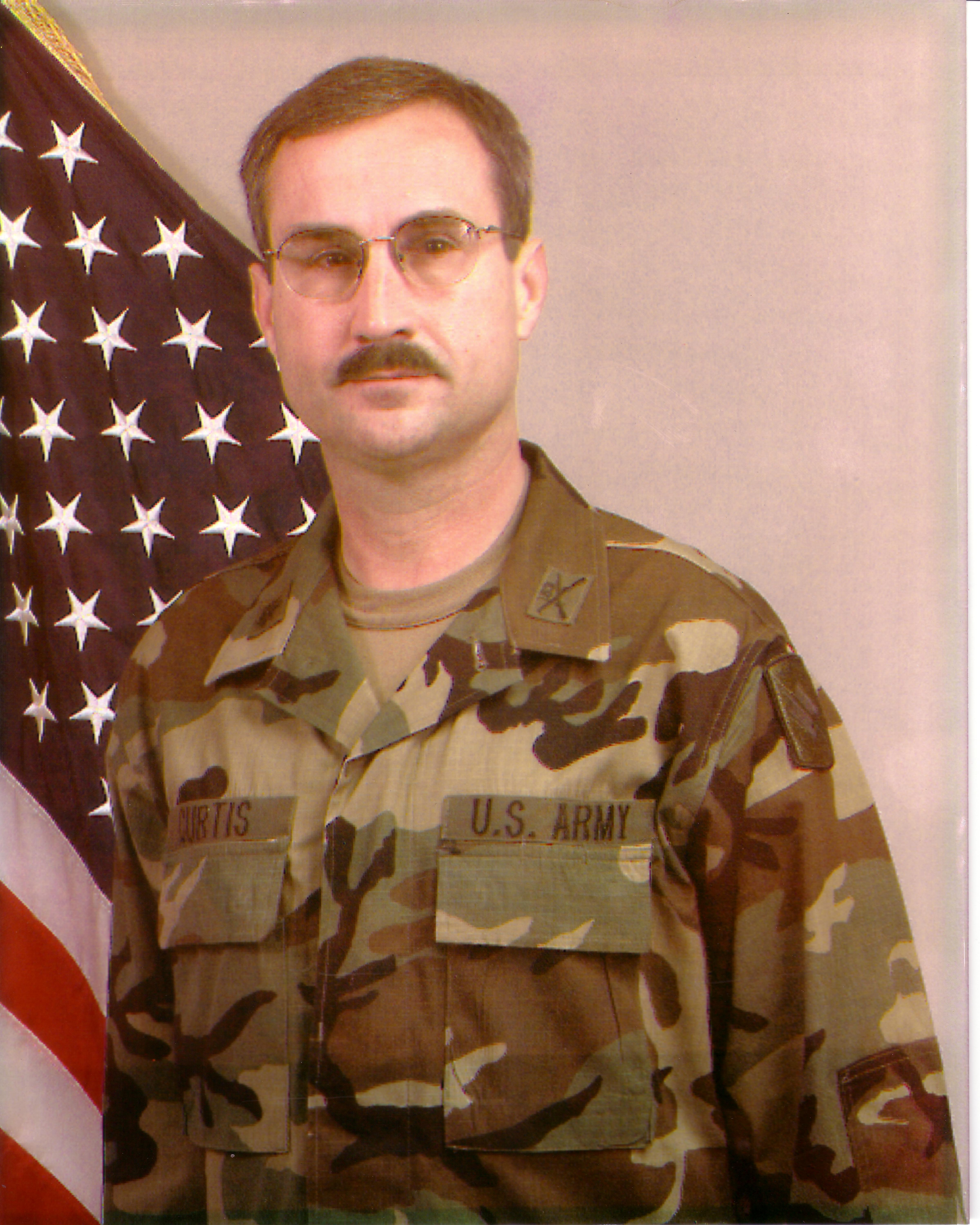
LTC Larry Curtis, 10 AUG 98 – 9 AUG 00

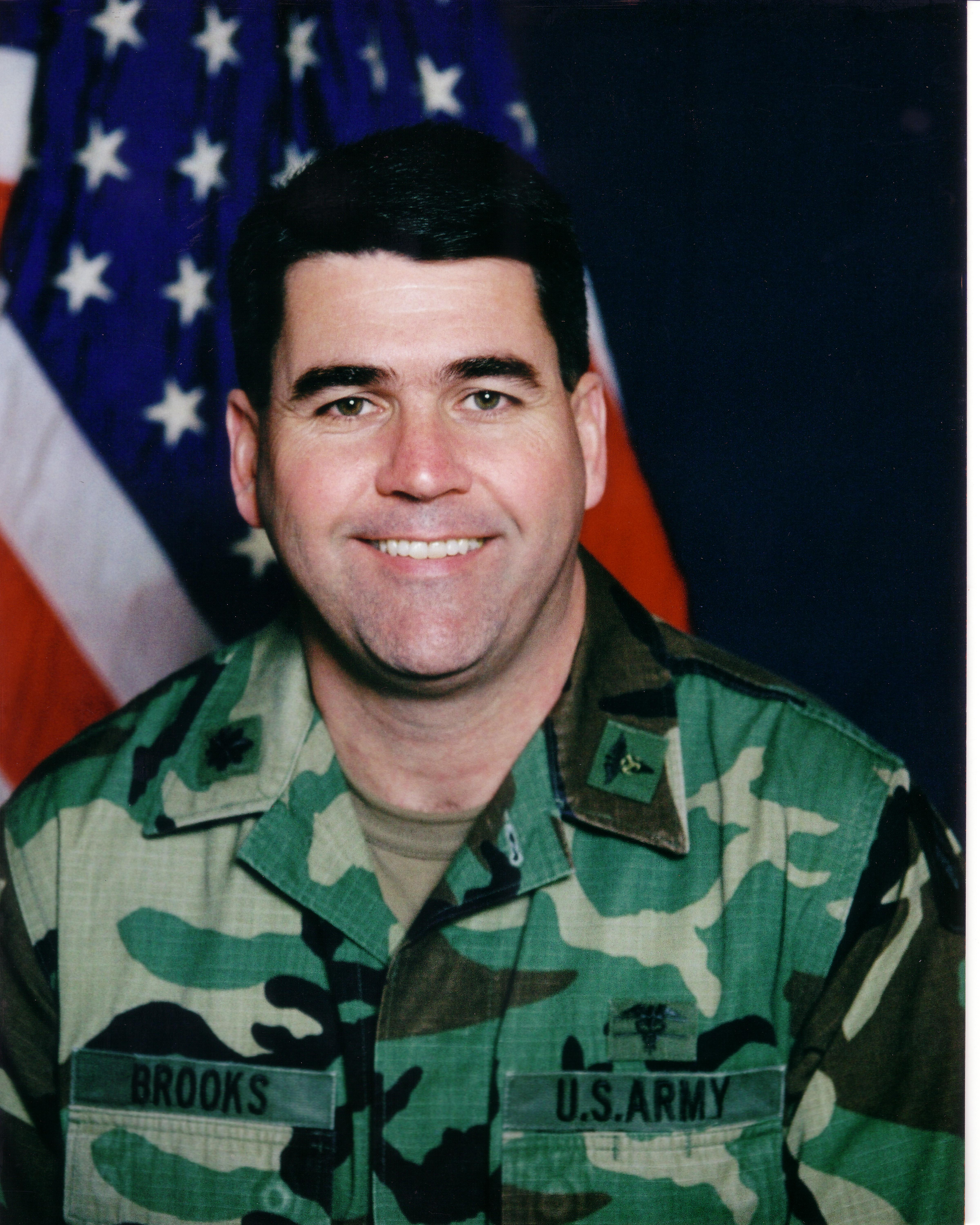
LTC Donald Brooks, 10 AUG 00 – 5 NOV 02

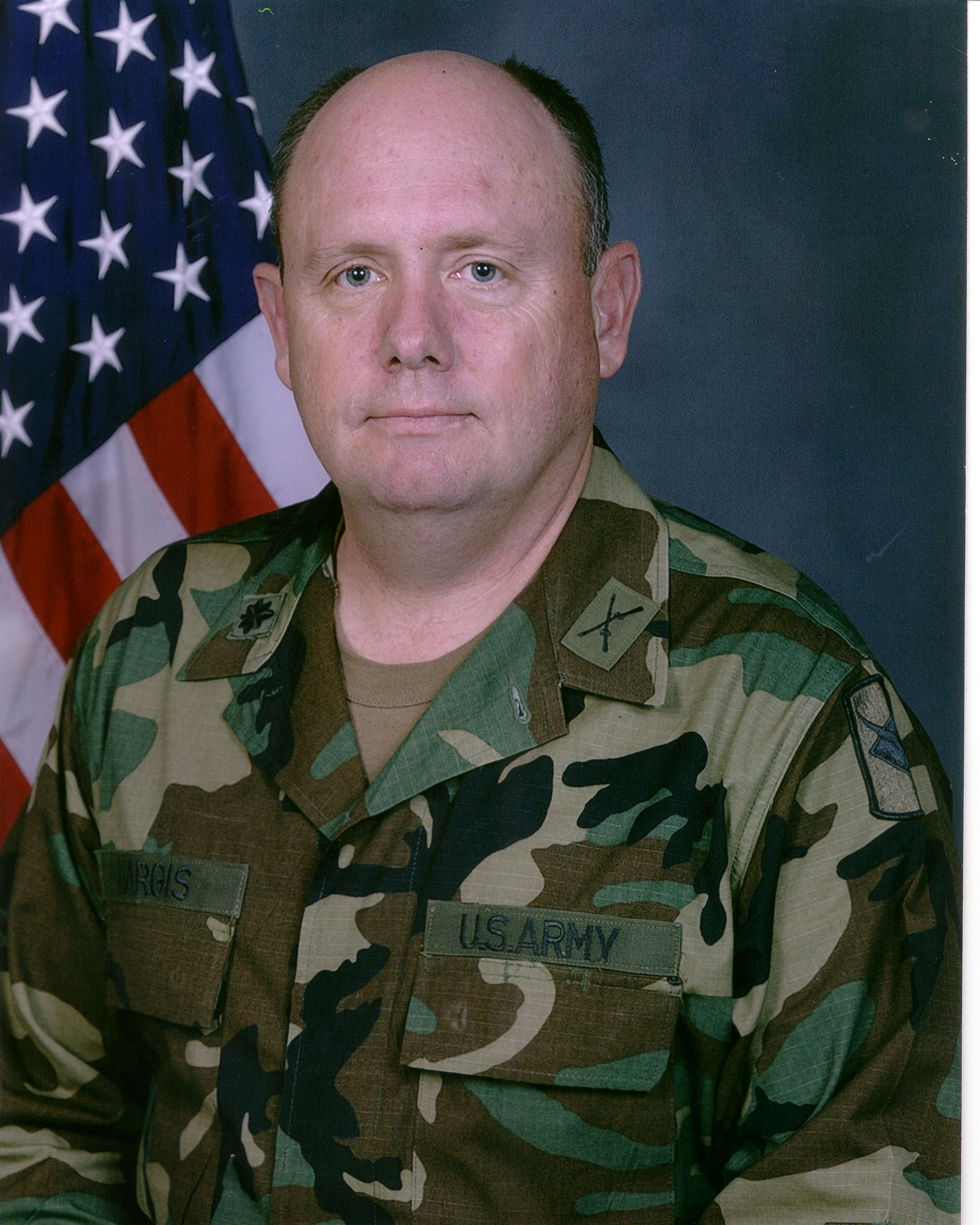
LTC Allen P. Hargis, 6 NOV 02 – 30 JUN 05

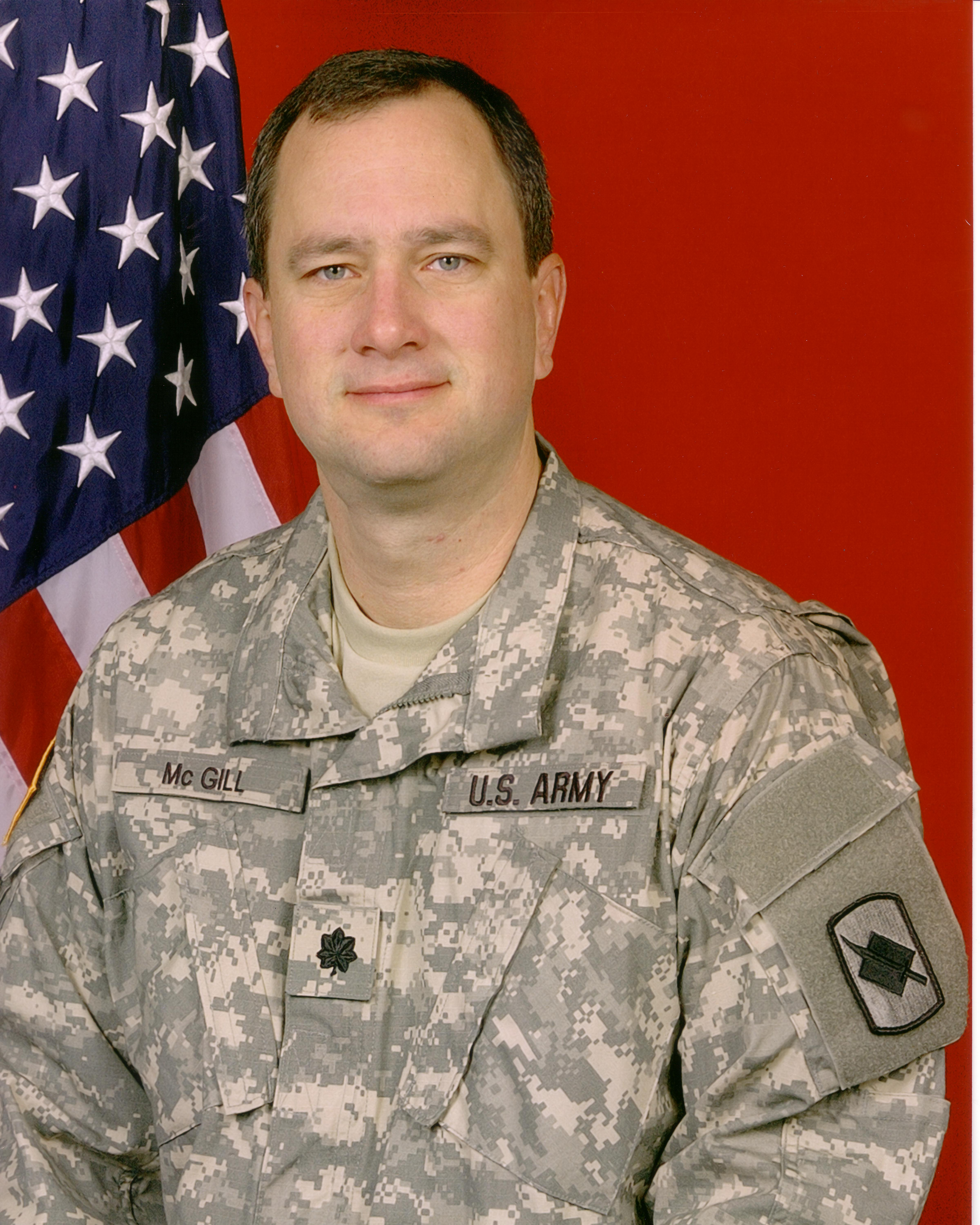
LTC Rob McGill, 1 JUL 05 – 30 APR 07

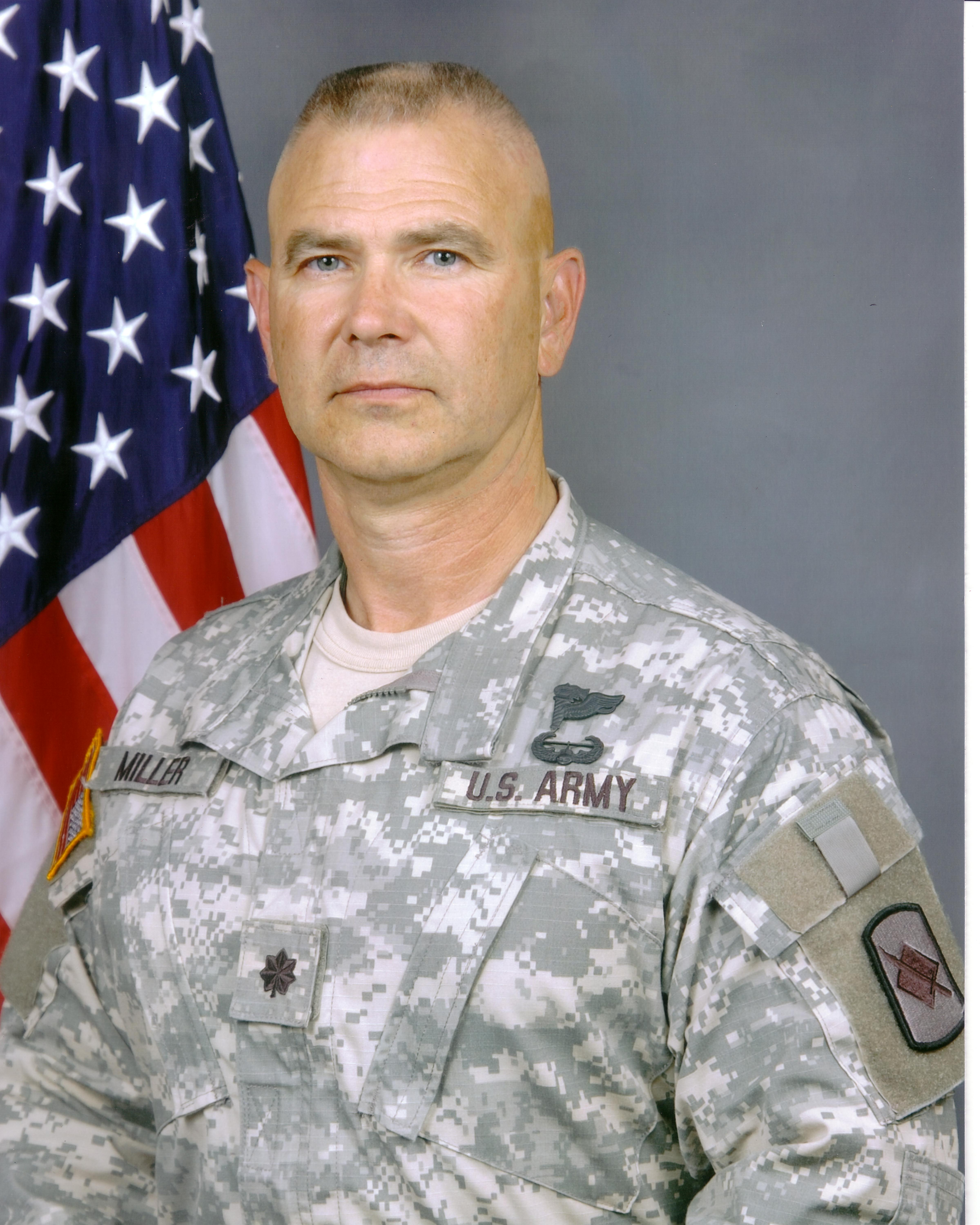
LTC Ricky D. Miller, 4 APR 07 – 12 JUN 09

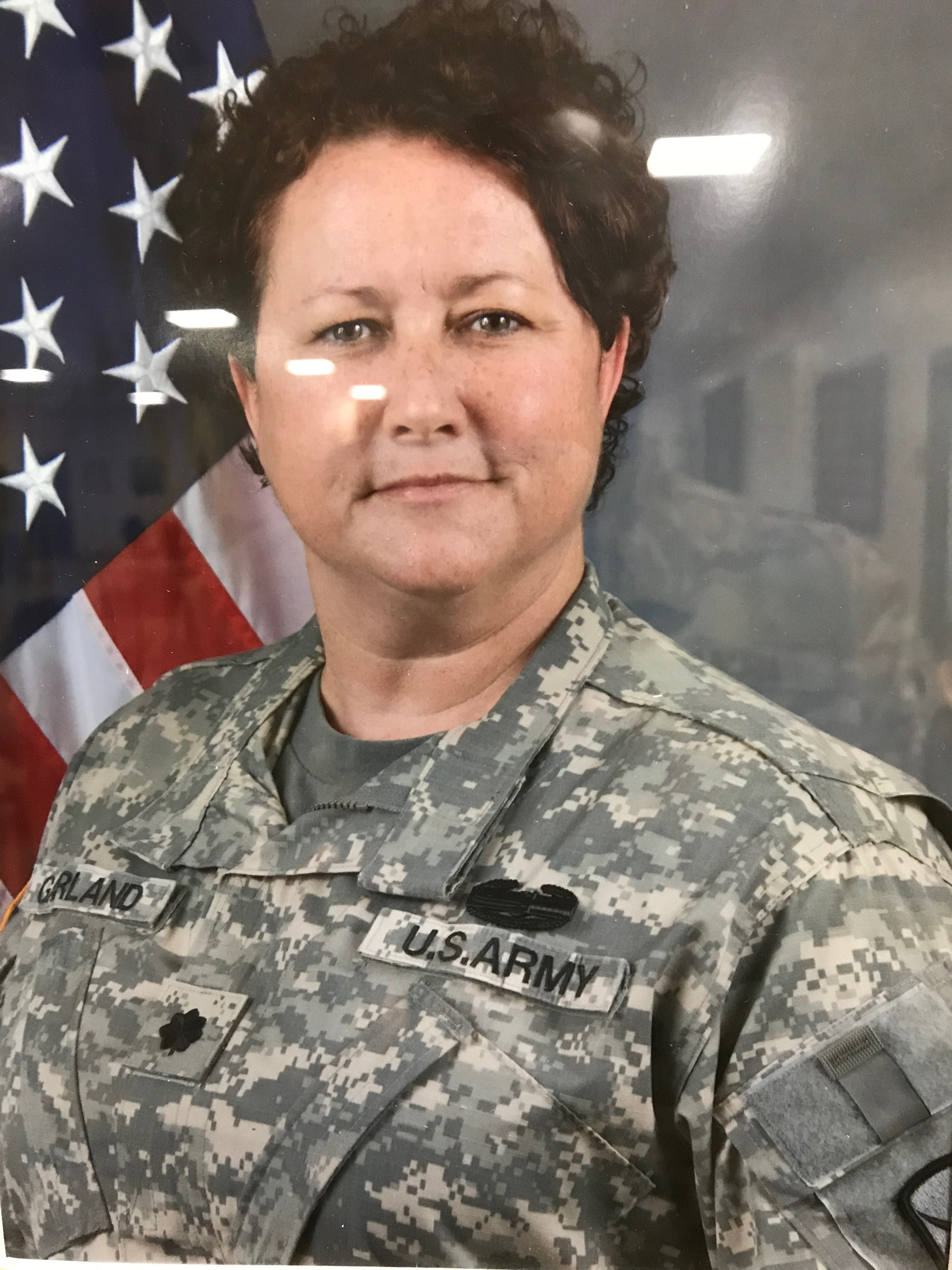
LTC Jeri Garland 13 JUN 09, to 2011

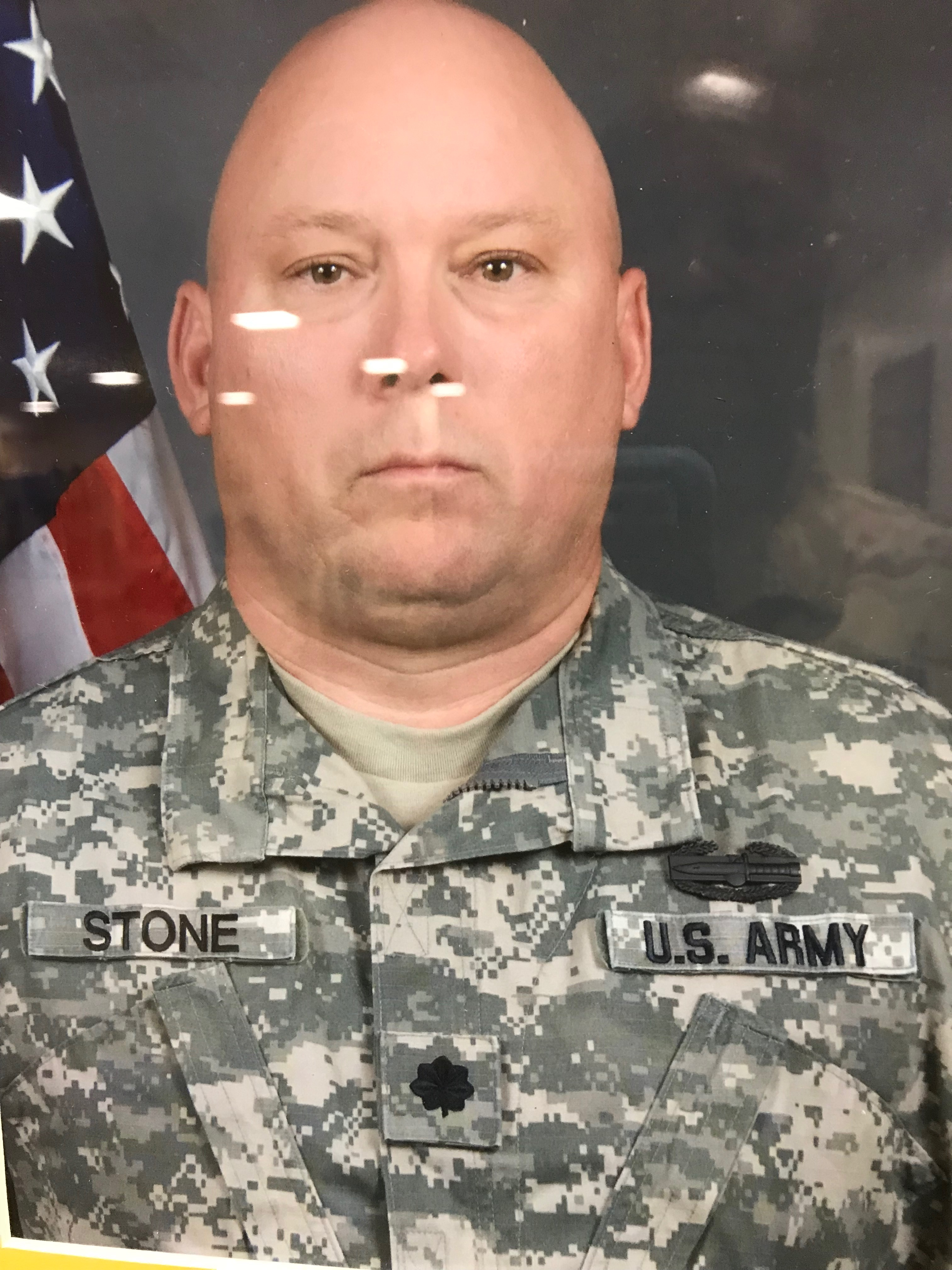
LTC Shannon W. Stone, 2011

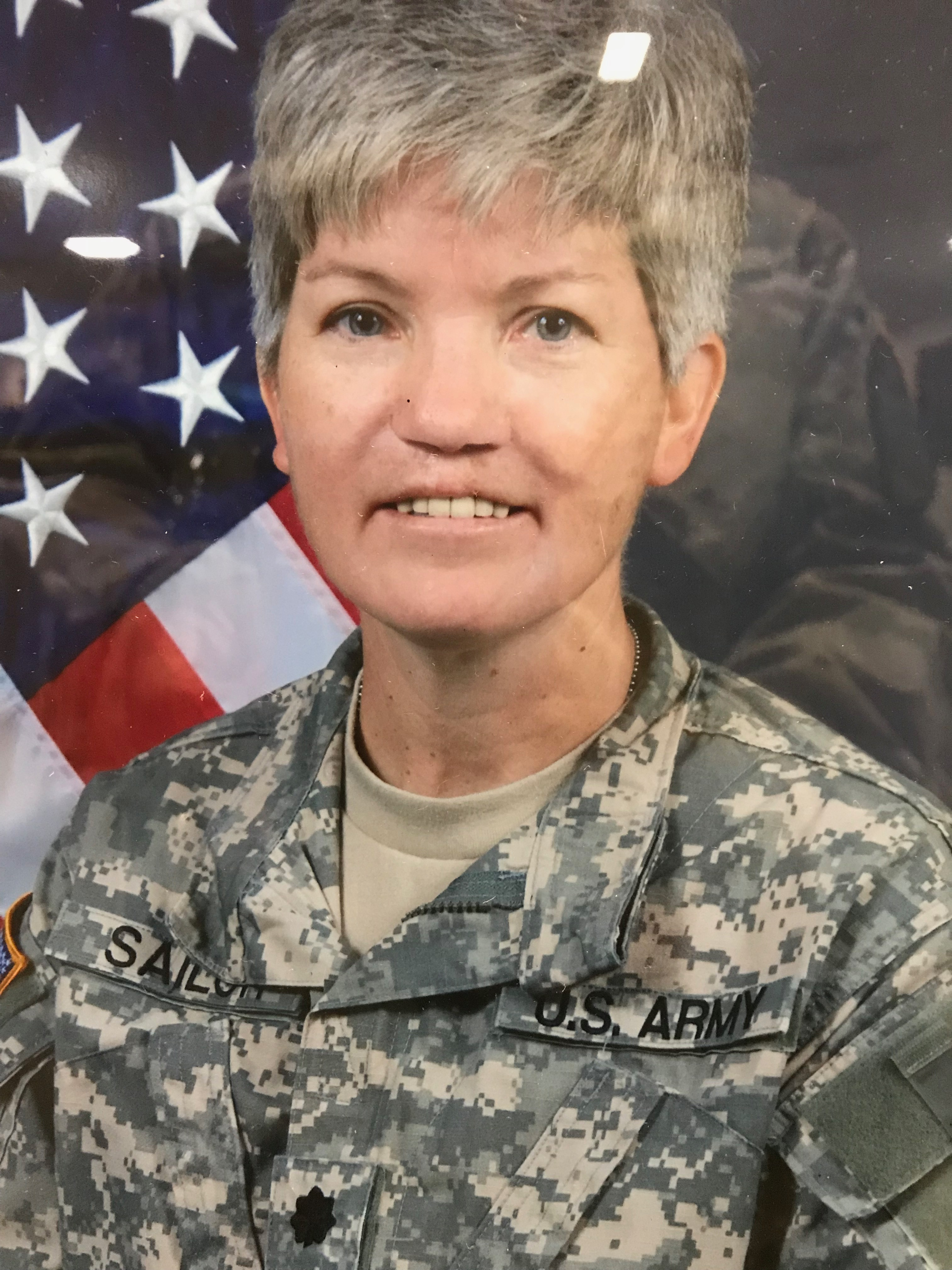
LTC Edith C. Sailor, 2011–2015

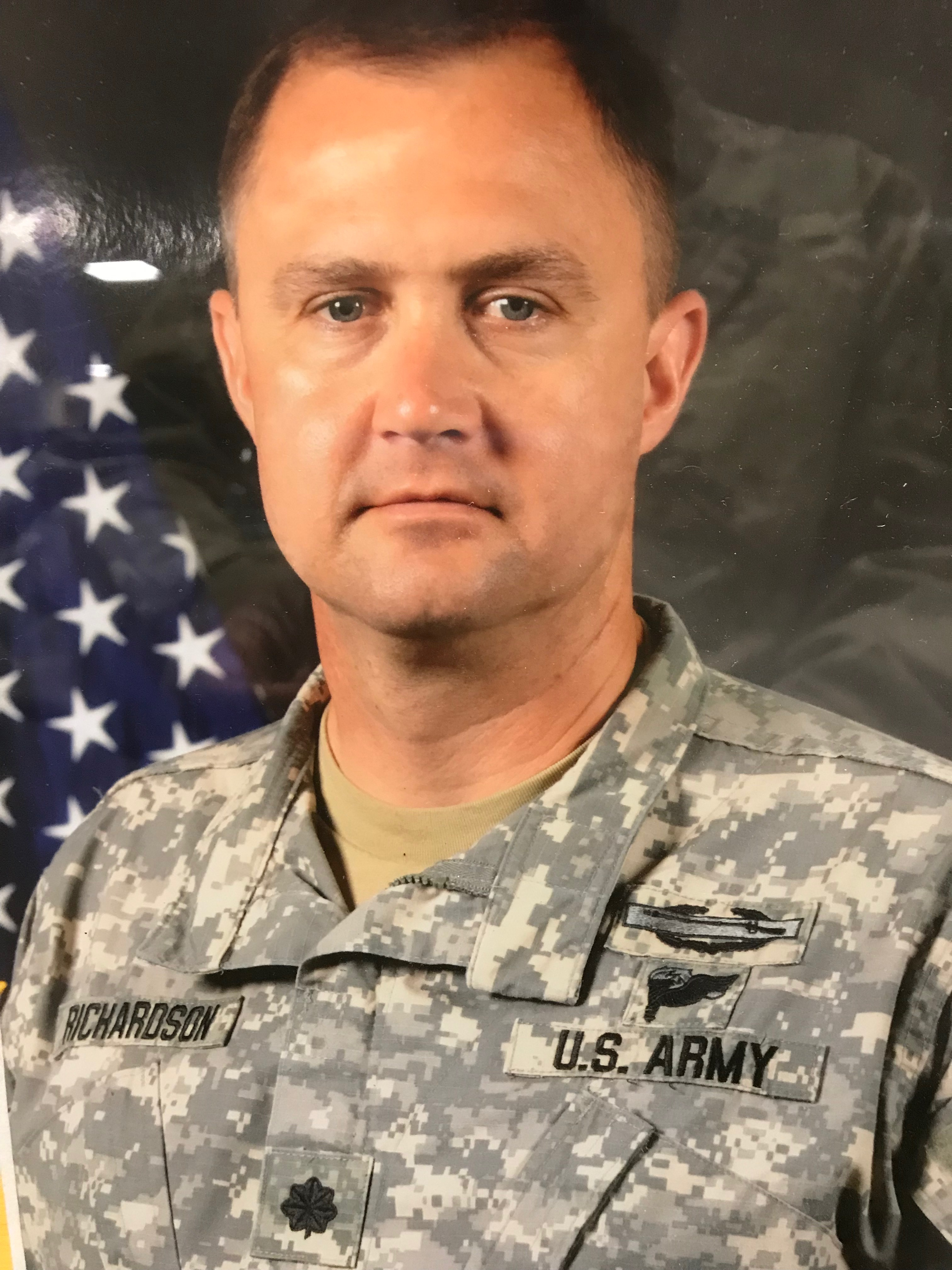
LTC Gib T. Richardson, 2015-2016

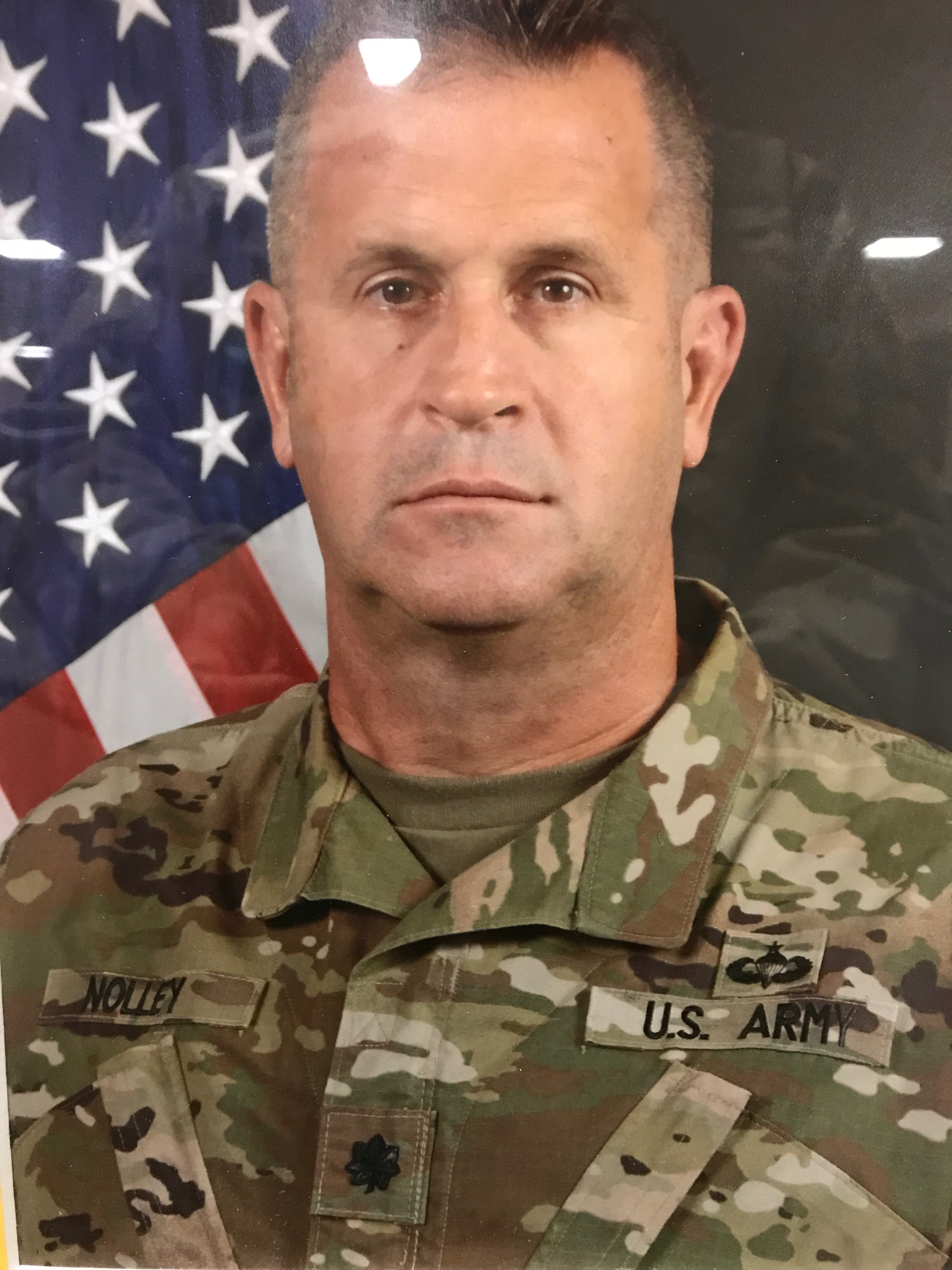
LTC James S. Nolley, 2016-2018

== Current unit locations ==
The units of the 39th Brigade Support Battalion are currently stationed as follows:

Unit	Station
Headquarters and Headquarters Company	Hazen
Company A (-)	White Hall
Detachment 1, Company A	Stuttgart
Company B	Heber Springs
Company C	Lonoke
Forward Support Company D (CAV Support)	Yutan, NE
Forward Support Company E (Brigade Engineer Battalion Support)	Benton
Forward Support Company F (Field Artillery Support)	Rogers
Forward Support Company G (1-153rd Infantry Battalion Support)	Warren
Forward Support Company H (2-153rd Infantry Battalion Support)	Cabot
Forward Support Company J (1-138th Infantry Battalion Support)	Jefferson City, MO

== Heraldic items ==
=== Distinctive unit insignia ===
- Description: A gold-color metal and enamel device 1 1/8 inches height oval all consisting of the shield and motto of the coat of arms.
- Symbolism: Scarlet and buff (gold) are the colors used for support. The fret (formed by the saltire and mascle) is symbolic of the interlaced support provided to combat elements. The blue mascle also alludes to the blue band bordering the white diamond of the Arkansas State flag and refers to the home area of the organization.
- Motto: Support, Spirit, Success

=== Coat of Arms ===
Blazon

- Shield: Or a saltire Gules interlaced with a mascle Azure.
- Crest: That for the regiments and separate battalions of the Arkansas Army National Guard: On a wreath of the colors (Or and Gules) above two sprays of apple blossoms Proper a diamond Argent charged with four mullets Azure, one in upper point and three in lower, within a bordure of the last, bearing twenty-five mullets of the second.
- Motto: SUPPORT SPIRIT SUCCESS.

Symbolism

- Shield: Scarlet and buff (gold) are the colors used for Support. The fret (formed by the saltire and the mascle) is symbolic of the interlaced support provided the combat elements. The blue mascle also alludes to the blue band bordering the white diamond of the Arkansas state flag and refers to the home area of the organization.
- Crest: The crest is that of the Arkansas Army National Guard.

Background
The coat of arms was approved on 13 October 1970.
