= 16th Engineer Brigade =

- 16th Engineer Brigade shoulder sleeve insignia
- Active: 1917 - present
- Country: United States
- Branch: United States Army National Guard
- Type: Combat Engineer
- Size: Brigade
- Part of: Ohio Army National Guard
- Garrison/HQ: Defense Supply Center Columbus (DSCC), Columbus, Ohio
- Nickname: "Iron Castle" (special designation)

Insignia
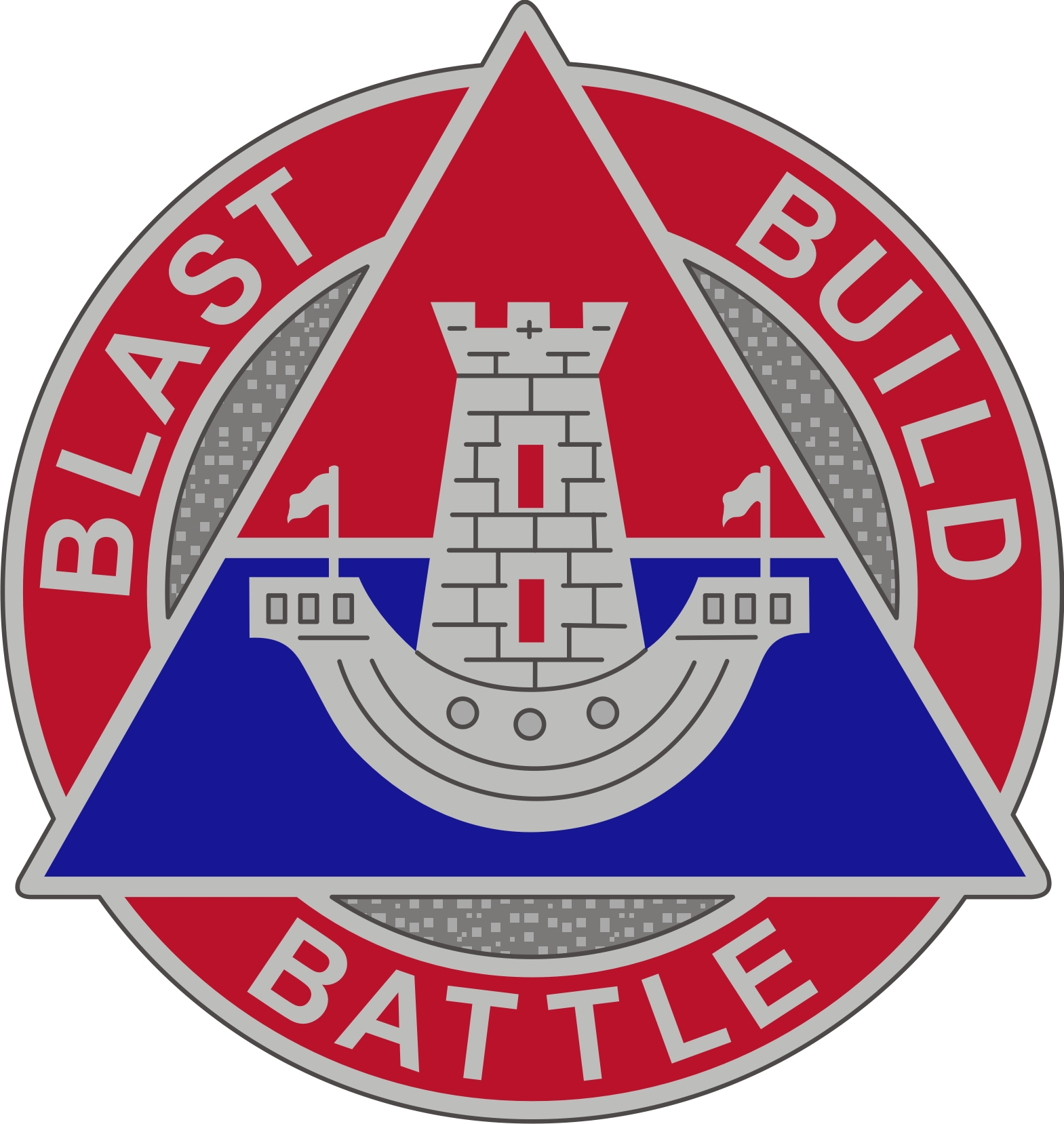
- Distinctive Unit Insignia

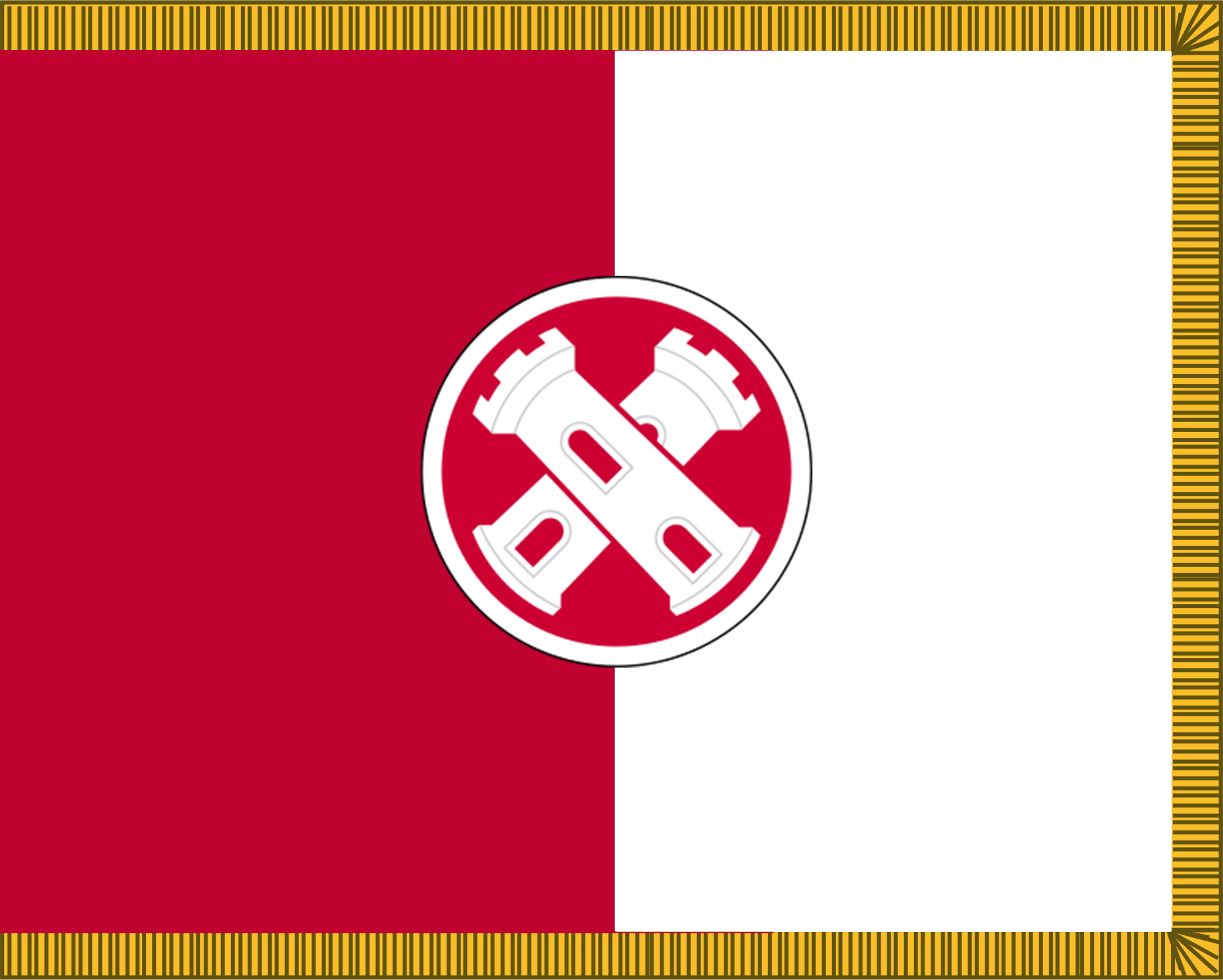
- 16th Engineer Brigade Flag

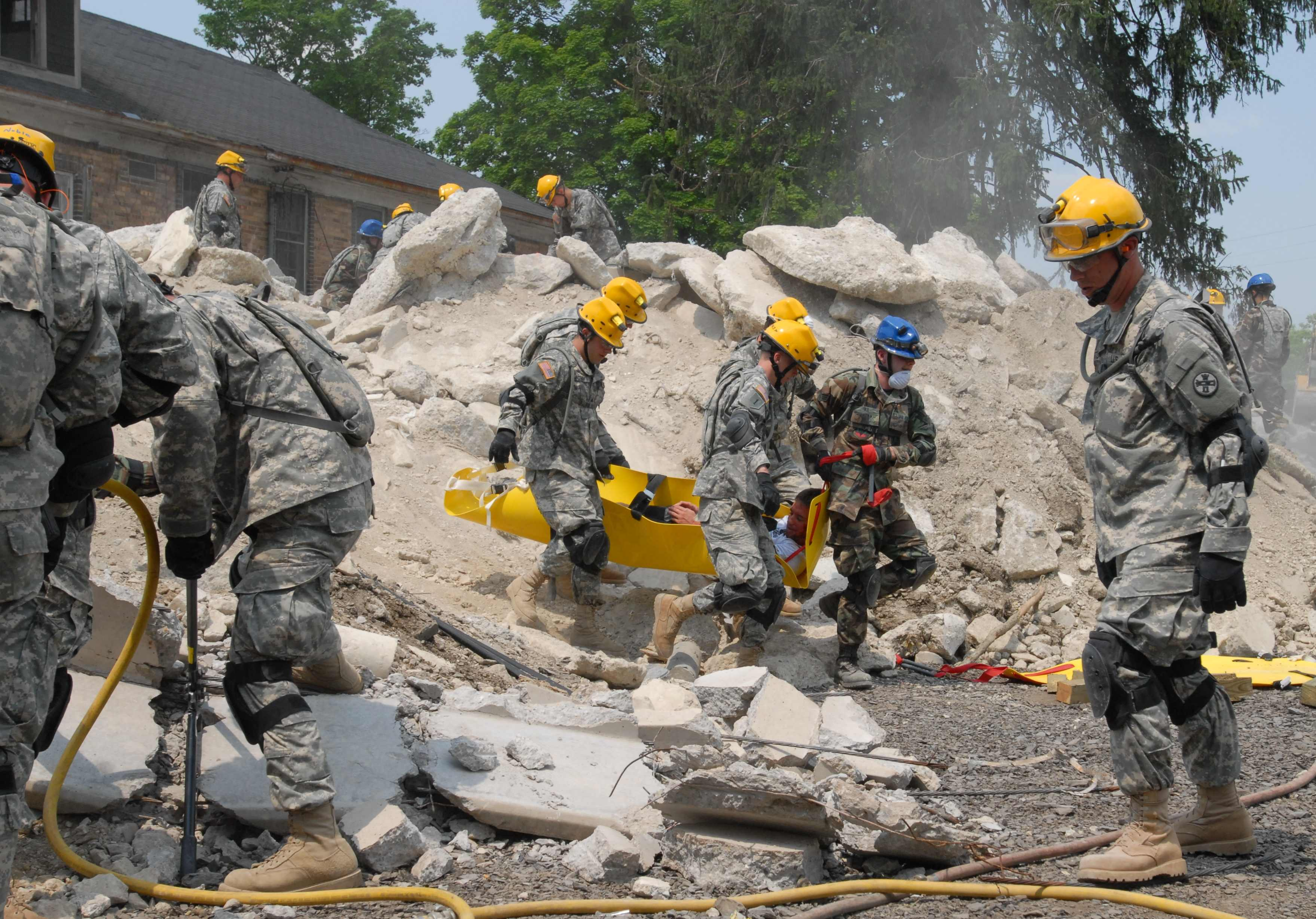
16th Engineer Brigade soldiers clearing a demolished building.

The 16th Engineer Brigade is a combat engineer brigade of the United States Army National Guard of Ohio. The brigade is responsible for a number of units throughout Ohio, most of which are also combat engineer units.

== Overview ==
Members of the brigade provide construction and design assistance for nations worldwide, both in aid to civilian authorities and traditional training environments. The HHC 16th Engineer Brigade, mobilized into federal active duty in June 2020 in support of Operation Spartan Shield, Task Force Iron Castle.

== Organization ==
As of February 2026 the 16th Engineer Brigade consists of the following units:

- 16th Engineer Brigade, in Columbus
  - Headquarters and Headquarters Company, 16th Engineer Brigade, in Columbus
  - 204th Engineer Detachment (Construction Management Team), in Columbus
  - 112th Engineer Battalion, in Brook Park
    - Headquarters and Headquarters Company, 112th Engineer Battalion, in Brook Park
    - Forward Support Company, 112th Engineer Battalion, in Brook Park
    - 291st Engineer Detachment (Concrete Section), in Newton Falls
    - 292nd Engineer Detachment (Asphalt), in Newton Falls
    - 812th Engineer Company (Sapper), in Lorain
    - 945th Engineer Company (Engineer Support Company), in Norwalk
    - 1192nd Engineer Company (Engineer Construction Company), in Newton Falls
    - 5694th Engineer Detachment (Fire Fighting Team — HQ), in Mansfield
    - 295th Engineer Detachment (Fire Fighting Team — Fire Truck), in Mansfield
    - 296th Engineer Detachment (Fire Fighting Team — Fire Truck), in Mansfield
  - 216th Engineer Battalion, in Cincinnati
    - Headquarters and Headquarters Company, 216th Engineer Battalion, in Cincinnati
    - Forward Support Company, 216th Engineer Battalion, in Cincinnati
    - 811th Engineer Company (Combat Engineer Company — Infantry), in Amanda
    - 1137th Signal Company (Tactical Installation/Networking), in Springfield
    - 1191st Engineer Company (Engineer Construction Company), in Portsmouth
    - 1194th Engineer Company (Vertical Construction Company), in Chillicothe

== Lineage ==
Parent unit constituted 29 August 1917 in the National Guard as Headquarters, 62d Field Artillery Brigade, an element of the 37th Division

Organized on 21 September 1917 at Camp Sherman, Ohio, with personnel from the Ohio National Guard

Demobilized on 11 April 1919 at Camp Sherman, Ohio

Expanded, reorganized, and Federally recognized in the Ohio National Guard as elements of the 37th Division as follows:

Headquarters, 62d Field Artillery Brigade 26 July 1922 at Columbus (location changed on 1 June 1937 to Cleveland) Headquarters Battery, 62d Field Artillery Brigade, 26 April 1922 at Dayton (hereafter, separate lineage)

Inducted into Federal service on 15 October 1940 at Columbus

Reorganized and redesignated 1 February 1942 as Headquarters, 37th Division Artillery

Inactivated on 18 December 1945 at Camp Anza, California

Consolidated 11 November 1946 with the 37th Reconnaissance Troop, Mechanized (see ANNEX); consolidated unit Federally recognized as Headquarters and Headquarters Battery, 37th Division Artillery

Ordered into active Federal service on 15 January 1952 at Columbus

(Headquarters and Headquarters Battery, 37th Division Artillery [NGUS] organized and Federally recognized 15 January 1954)

Released from active Federal service on 15 June 1954 and reverted to state control; Federal recognition was concurrently withdrawn from Headquarters and Headquarters Battery, 37th Division Artillery (NGUS)

Redesignated 1 September 1959 as Headquarters and Headquarters Battery, 37th Infantry Division Artillery

Converted and redesignated 15 February 1968 as Headquarters and Headquarters Company, 16th Engineer Brigade and relieved from assignment to the 37th Infantry Division

Ordered into active Federal service 10 September 2005 at Columbus; released from active Federal service 8 March 2007 and reverted to state control

Ordered into active Federal service on 31 August 2009 at Columbus; released from active Federal service 4 October 2010 and reverted to state control

Ordered into active Federal service on 25 June 2020 at Columbus

ANNEX

Organized and Federally recognized on 29 April 1921 in the Ohio National Guard at Columbus as Headquarters Company, 2d Infantry Brigade

Reorganized and redesignated 1 July 1921 as Headquarters Company, 74th Infantry Brigade an element of the 37th Division (later redesignated as the 37th Infantry Division)

Inducted into Federal service on 15 October 1940 at Columbus

Converted and redesignated on 1 February 1942 as the 37th Cavalry Reconnaissance Troop

Reorganized and redesignated on 1 June 1944 as the 37th Reconnaissance Troop, Mechanized

Inactivated on 13 December 1945 at Camp Stoneman, California

== Honors ==
CAMPAIGN PARTICIPATION CREDIT

World War I

Lorraine 1918

World War II

Northern Solomons

Luzon (with arrowhead)

War on Terrorism

Iraq

Iraq Governance

National Resolution

Iraqi Sovereignty

DECORATIONS

Presidential Unit Citation (Army), Streamer embroidered BOUGAINVILLE

Philippine Presidential Unit Citation, Streamer embroidered 17 OCTOBER 1944 TO 4 JULY 1945

Meritorious Unit Citation (Army), Streamer embroidered IRAQ 2005–2006

Meritorious Unit Commendation (Army), Streamer embroidered IRAQ 2009 - 2010
