= 108th Aviation Regiment =

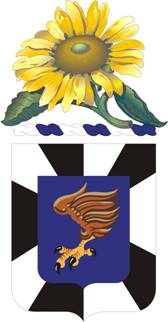
- coat of arms
- Country: United States of America
- Allegiance: Kansas, United States of America
- Branch: Kansas Army National Guard
- Type: United States Army Aviation
- Mottos: "Strength and Courage"
- Colors: Ultramarine Blue & Golden Orange Piping
- Anniversaries: 8 March 1922
- Decorations: Army Meritorious Unit Commendation, Army Superior Unit Award

Commanders
- Battalion Commander: LTC Jordan Clark
- Command Sergeant Major: CSM Jared Worley
- Battalion Executive Officer: MAJ Thomas Winford

Aircraft flown
- Utility helicopter: UH-60M Black Hawk

The 108th Aviation Regiment is a unit of the United States Army. It is part of the Kansas Army National Guard and has served with distinction in World War II (under a different designation and configuration), Iraq and Afghanistan.

The 1st Battalion (Assault), 108th Aviation Regiment not only has its assault helicopter and MEDEVAC duties around the world, it assists throughout the United States with wildfires and hurricane relief.

The 1st Battalion, 108th Aviation Regiment wears the 35th Infantry Division patch as a subordinate unit of the Combat Aviation Brigade, 35th Infantry Division and it is assigned to the 635th Regional Support Group.

== History ==
The lineage of the 108th Aviation Regiment, which today is represented by a single battalion, dates back to 8 March 1922 and the organization and Federal recognition of the HQ Detachment, 1st Squadron, 114th Cavalry, an element of the 24th Cavalry Division (United States). Before becoming an Aviation unit, the unit would be assigned to a variety of branches and roles over the next four decades, including Field Artillery in 1940 (HQ Battery, 127th Field Artillery), Tank Destroyer Corps in 1942 (Pioneer Company, 635th Tank Destroyer Battalion), Military Police in 1948 (Company B, 174th Military Police Battalion), and Transportation in 1959 (Aircraft Maintenance Detachment, 135th Transportation Battalion).

On 15 November 1965, while designated as the 1120th Transportation Detachment, it was converted and redesignated as the 169th Aviation Company, but it would be designated as a Transportation unit two more times between then and its designation as the 135th Aviation Battalion in October 1986.

The unit received its current designation on 1 October 1987 when it was reorganized and redesignated in the Arizona, Kansas, and Oregon Army National Guard as the 108th Aviation, a parent regiment in the U.S. Army Regimental System. In 1996, it was reorganized to consist of the 1st Battalion, a structure it retains in 2019. The Battalion, officially designated as 1-108 Assault Helicopter Battalion, is assigned to the 35th Combat Aviation Brigade and is headquartered at Topeka, Kansas.

In 1987, the unit was reorganized as the 108th Aviation Regiment under the National Guards of Oregon, Kansas and Arizona. Eventually, the Texas Army National Guard took command of some elements of the 108th Aviation Regiment, and currently commands sections of the regiment along with the Kansas Army National Guard.

== Structure ==
- 1st Battalion (Assault) at Topeka (UH-60M) (KS ARNG):
  - Headquarters and Headquarters Company, Topeka, KS
    - Det 1, HHC (TX ARNG), Austin, TX
  - Company A (Assault), Topeka, KS
  - Company B (Assault), Salina, KS
    - Det 1, Co. B (Assault), Austin, TX
  - Company C (Assault) (TX ARNG), Austin, TX
  - Company D (Aviation Maintenance), Topeka, KS
    - Det 1, Co. D (AVIM), Austin, TX
  - Company E (Forward Support), Topeka, KS
    - Det 1, Co. E (FS), Austin, TX
  - Company G (MEDEVAC), 1st Battalion (General Support), 111th Aviation Regiment, Topeka, KS
    - Det 5, Co. D (AVIM), 1st Battalion (General Support), 111th Aviation Regiment, Topeka, KS
    - Det 6, Co. E (FS), 1st Battalion (General Support), 111th Aviation Regiment, Topeka, KS
