= 35th Combat Aviation Brigade (United States) =

- 35th ID Shoulder Sleeve Insignia
- Active: 1997 – present
- Country: United States
- Allegiance: Missouri
- Branch: Army National Guard
- Type: Aviation
- Role: Headquarters
- Size: Brigade
- Part of: 35th Infantry Division
- Garrison/HQ: Sedalia, Missouri
- Engagements: Operation Enduring Freedom; Operation Spartan Shield; Operation Inherent Resolve; Battle of Baghuz Fawqani

Commanders
- Current commander: Colonel Paul R. Howerton

The 35th Combat Aviation Brigade is a subordinate command of the 35th Infantry Division (Missouri Army National Guard), located in Sedalia, Missouri.

Formed in September 1989 (initially as the 635th Aviation Group), the brigade has evolved through several reorganizations and redesignations.

== History ==
The 35th Combat Aviation Brigade (CAB) traces its origins to the late Cold War era. It was first stood up in October 1988 as the 635th Aviation Group and activated on 16 September 1989 to provide command and control of Missouri Army National Guard aviation units. Following four years of service, the group was inactivated in August 1993 as part of a post–Cold War force reduction

The headquarters was reestablished on 24 March 1997 as Headquarters and Headquarters Company, Aviation Brigade, 35th Infantry Division, in Warrensburg, Missouri.

In 2003, the headquarters relocated to Sedalia, Missouri, where it remains today, and was redesignated as the 20th Aviation Brigade (Theater). On 2 January 2009, the unit became Headquarters and Headquarters Company, Combat Aviation Brigade, 35th Infantry Division.

The brigade’s first major overseas deployment came in August 2012, when the 35th CAB mobilized to Kuwait for a nine-month rotation in support of Operation Spartan Shield and Operation Enduring Freedom. During this mission, the brigade provided aviation support across the U.S. Central Command area of responsibility, including air assault, cargo and troop transport, reconnaissance, and medical evacuation.

In 2018–2019, the brigade again deployed to the Middle East for Operation Spartan Shield and Operation Inherent Resolve, operating under the call sign Task Force Trailblazer. The 35th CAB commanded aviation elements from multiple states.

Over the course of the deployment, the brigade executed more than 14,000 missions and nearly 10,000 flight hours, transported more than 41,000 personnel, and moved over 14 million pounds of cargo throughout the Combined Joint Operations Area. The brigade also played a supporting role during the Battle of Baghuz Fawqani in Syria, the final major battle against ISIS’s territorial caliphate.

== Organization ==
The current configuration is as follows:

- 1st Battalion, 106th Aviation Regiment, Fort Leonard Wood
  - Detachment 1, Company D, 1st Battalion, 106th Aviation Regiment, Fort Leonard Wood
  - Detachment 1, Company E, 1st Battalion, 106th Aviation Regiment, Fort Leonard Wood
- Company B, 1st Battalion, 134th Aviation Regiment, Jefferson City, Missouri
- 1st Battalion, 135th Aviation Regiment, Whiteman Air Force Base
- 3rd Battalion, 135th Aviation Regiment, Lebanon, Missouri
- Detachment 3, Company I, 185th Aviation Regiment, (C23) Springfield, Missouri
- Detachment 40, Operations Support Airlift Command (OSACOM), Jefferson City
- 935th Aviation Support Battalion (935th ASB), Springfield
  - Company A, Aurora, Missouri
  - Detachment 3, Company B, Springfield, Missouri
  - Company C, Warrensburg, Missouri
- Company C, 1st Battalion, 108th Aviation Regiment
