= List of United States Army installations in Kuwait =

== Temporary base ==
For the 2026 Iran war, US Forces relocated their armed general and members to a temporary base at Bubiyan Island named Camp Al-Adiri from Camp Arifjan.

== Current bases ==
- Ali Al Salem Air Base
- Ahmad al-Jaber Air Base
- Camp Arifjan
- Camp Buehring (formerly Camp Udairi)
- Camp Patriot (shared with Kuwait Naval Base)
- Camp Spearhead (shared with port of Ash Shuaiba)
- Camp Virginia

== No longer existent ==
- Camp Maine (closed in 2003)
- Camp Pennsylvania (closed in 2004)
- Camp New Jersey (closed in 2004, combined to become part of Camp Virginia)
- Camp New York (closed in 2004, reactivated and deactivated several times since)
- Camp Wolverine (closed in 2005)
- Camp Victory (closed in 2006)
- Camp Doha (closed in 2006, forces and equipment distributed among Camps Arifjan and Buehring)
- Camp Navistar (closed in 2007)
- Camp LSA (closed in 2013, U.S. Army administered part of Ali Al Salem Air Base)
- Camp Amber SEMC (unofficial closed in 2013 TS, S, C)
- Khabari Crossing (unofficial closed 2011)
- KCIA Camp Wolf (closed in 2005)
- TAA Thunder (closed in 2003)
