= Kabal =

Kabal may refer to:

- Kabal (earthworks), a desert fortification found in northern Kuwait used to house American military and coalition forces
- Kabal Tehsil, a tehsil in Pakistan
- Kabal, Pakistan, a city in Khyber Pakhtunkhwa, Pakistan
- Kabal (Mortal Kombat), a character from the Mortal Kombat series
- KABAL, a 1982 tabletop role-playing game
- Kabal, Croatia, a village near Farkaševac
- Kabal language, the name for the Martu Wangka dialect used by the Maduwongga people in Australia

== See also ==
- Cabal (disambiguation)
- Kabala (disambiguation)
- Kabali (disambiguation)
