= 153rd Cavalry Regiment =

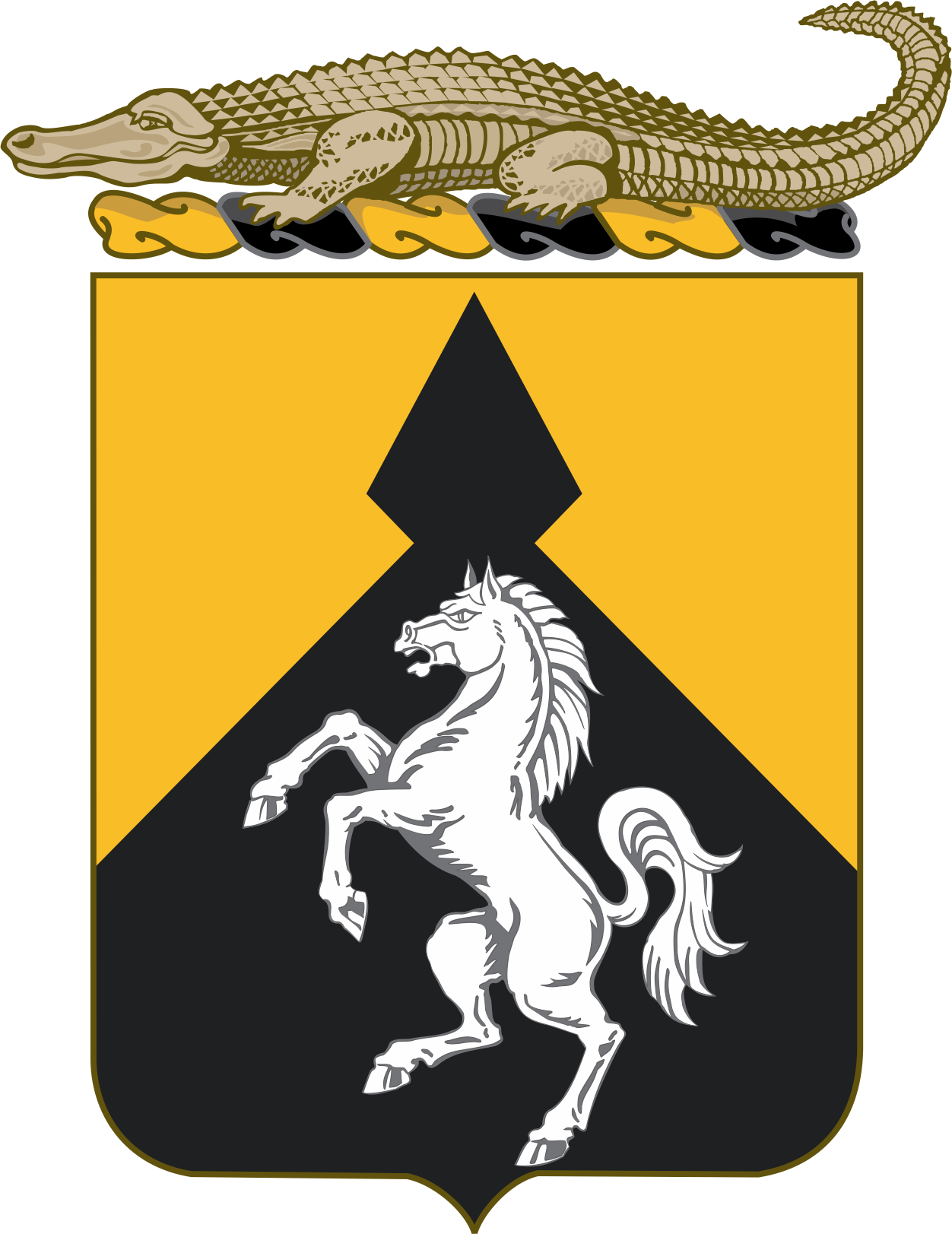
- Coat of arms
- Active: circa 1884–present
- Country: United States
- Allegiance: Florida
- Branch: United States Army
- Type: Cavalry
- Role: Reconnaissance, surveillance, and target acquisition
- Size: Squadron
- Garrison/HQ: Panama City, Florida
- Nickname: Darkhorse
- Motto: Scouts Out
- Engagements: World War I World War II; Operation Iraqi Freedom; Operation Enduring Freedom; Operation New Dawn
- Decorations: Presidential Unit Citation; Philippine Presidential Unit Citation

Insignia
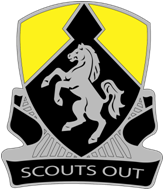
- Distinctive unit insignia

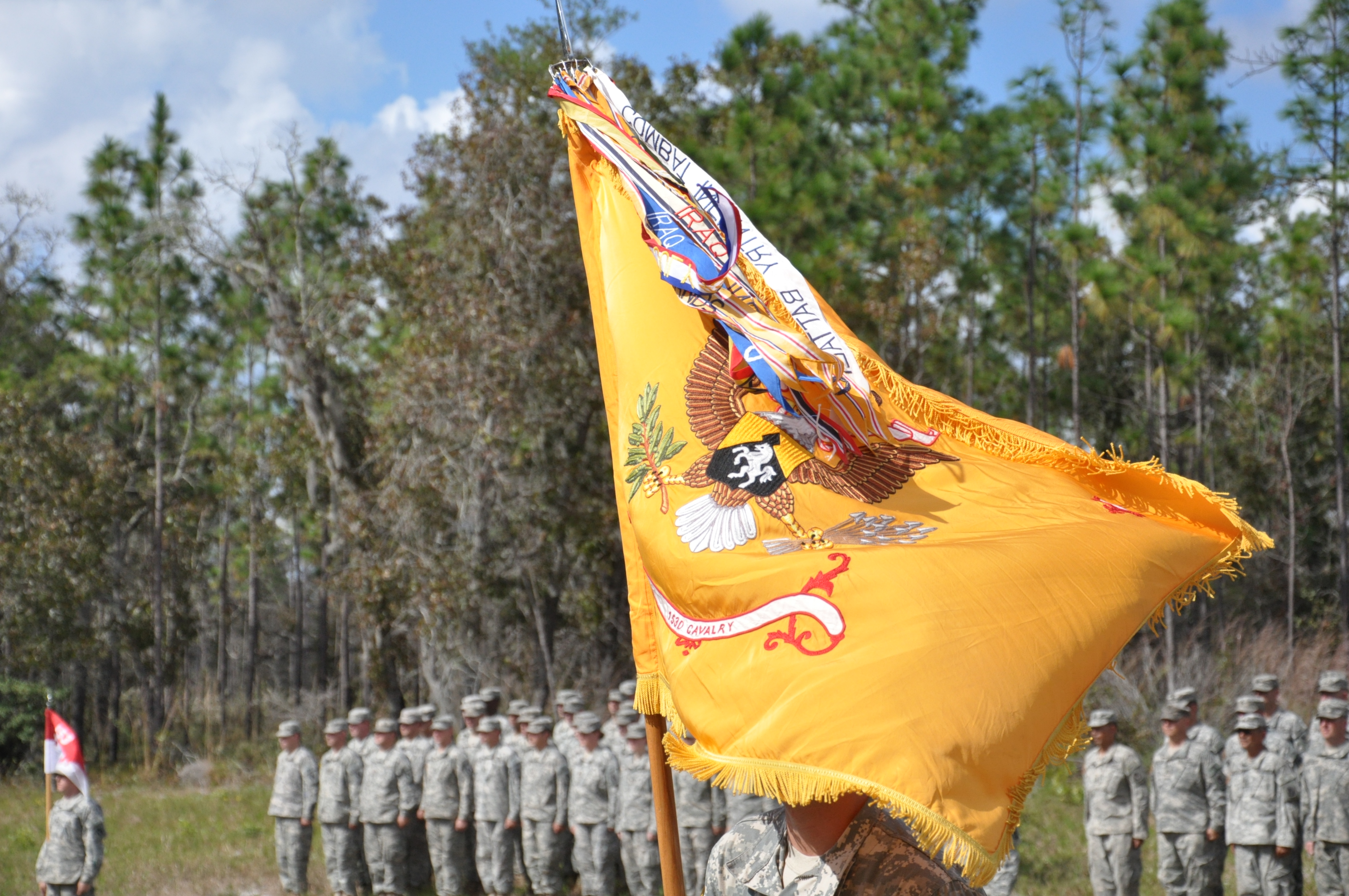
Pre-mobilization at Camp Blanding, FL in October, 2009.

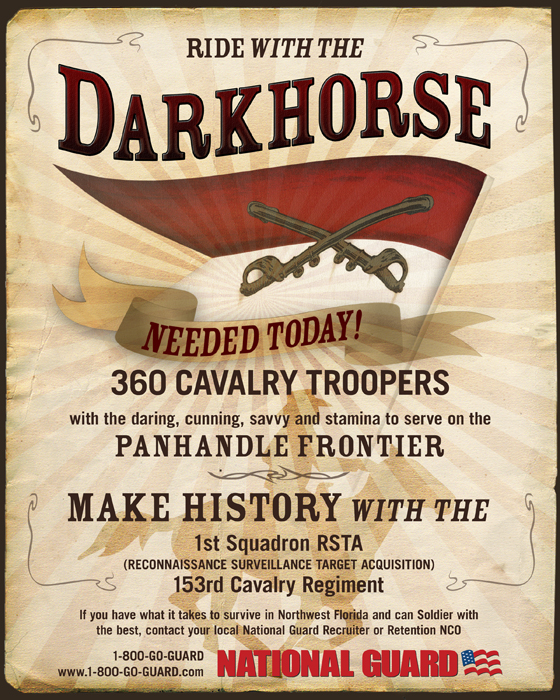
2008 recruitment poster for the "Darkhorse" Squadron.

First Squadron, 153rd Cavalry Regiment "Darkhorse" is an element of the Florida Army National Guard, headquartered in Panama City, Florida with units throughout the Panhandle. It was formerly 3rd Battalion, 124th Infantry and officially converted to cavalry on 1 September 2007 when the 53rd Infantry Brigade converted from a "separate brigade" to the brigade combat team structure.

== History ==
=== First Squadron, 153rd Cavalry Regiment ===
Though the squadron's lineage traces back to the formation of the parent units of the 124th Infantry Regiment (formed between 1884 and 1892), the current structure and stationing of the squadron begins with the reorganization of the Florida National Guard in January 1968. It was then that existing engineer and cavalry units in the Florida Panhandle were converted and redesignated as the reconstituted 3rd Infantry Battalion, 124th Infantry Regiment with headquarters at Panama City. Third Battalion was a light infantry unit belonging to the 53rd Infantry Brigade. They specialized in jungle fighting and made many rotations to Fort Sherman, Panama to conduct annual training.

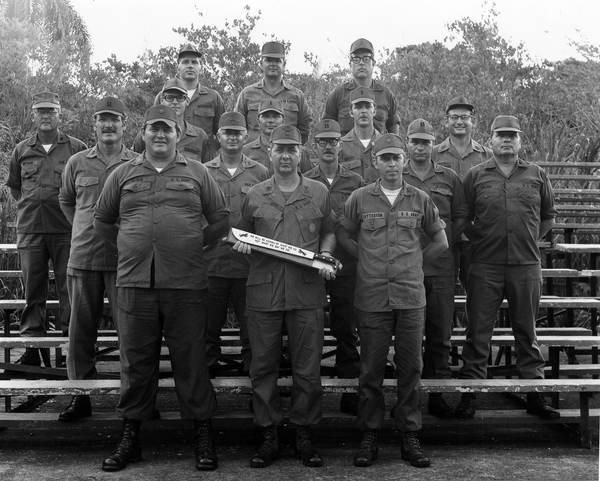
Staff of 3rd Battalion, 124th Infantry, Commanded by LTC Charles Mohr in Fort Sherman, Panama, at annual training in 4–18 August 1973.

Third Battalion, 124th Infantry Regiment (except for Company D which was broken up and its members dispersed throughout the battalion) was mobilized just after Christmas 2002 and on 5 January 2003, drove up to Fort Stewart, Georgia for training in preparation for a deployment. Third Battalion deployed to Kuwait in February and was part of the initial invasion of Iraq during Operation Iraqi Freedom. The battalion was attached to the 108th Air Defense Artillery Brigade, 3rd Infantry Division, and 1st Marine Division at various times during the invasion. In 2004 when 3rd Infantry Division left Iraq to return home, 3rd Battalion, 124 Infantry Regiment was attached to 1st Armored Division, with elements also supporting Operational Detachment Alphas (ODAs) from 5th Special Forces Group and 19th Special Forces Group. The battalion was assigned to downtown Baghdad, based at Forward Operating Base Warrior in the Aadhamiya neighborhood. They redeployed home in February 2004.

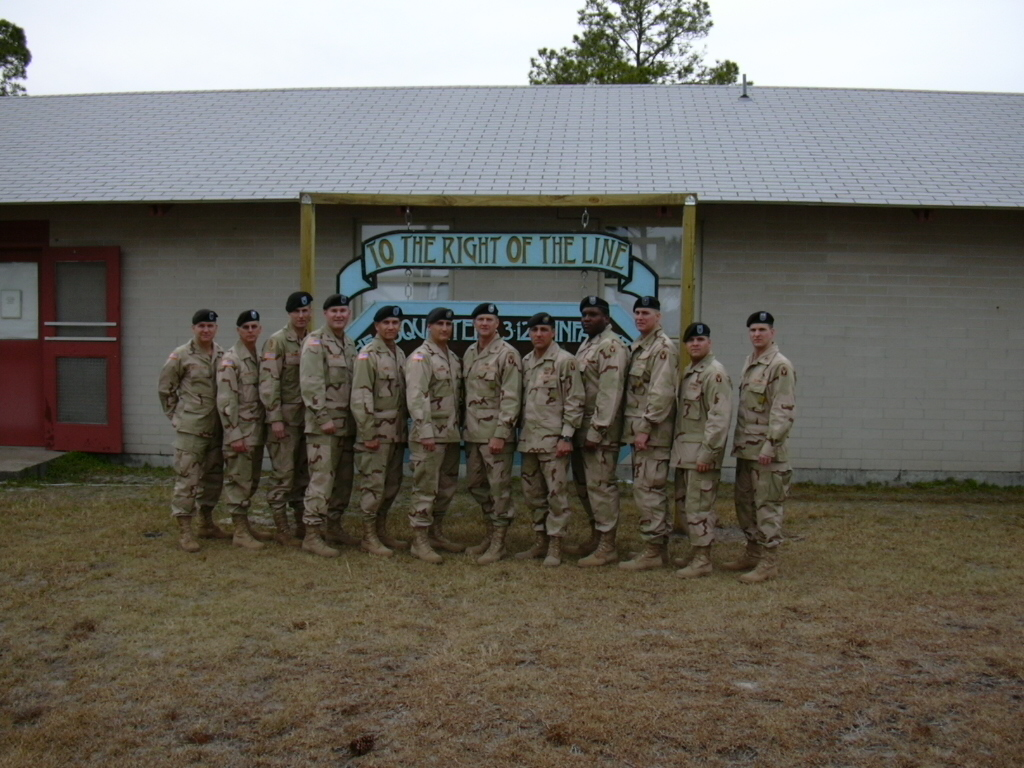
Staff of 3rd Battalion, 124th Infantry at Fort Stewart in 2003 prior to the Iraq Invasion.

On 1 September 2007, 3rd Battalion, 124th Infantry was converted and redesignated as the 153rd Cavalry Regiment. Three years after the cavalry transformation, the squadron was mobilized and deployed with the 53rd Infantry Brigade Combat Team in support of Operations Iraqi Freedom and New Dawn. In preparation for their 2010 deployment, the squadron underwent intense pre-mobilization training at Camp Blanding, Florida for the entire month of October 2009. They mobilized under Title 10 orders on 2 January 2010 and flew to Fort Hood, Texas for two months of mobilization training. In the first week of March the squadron arrived at Camp Buehring, Kuwait. Troop B deployed to Qatar for a security force mission. HHT, A, and C Troops were stationed at Camp Buehring, Kuwait. Troop A controlled Khabari Crossing at the border of Iraq. C Troop was responsible for quick reaction force (QRF) missions around Camps Buehring and Virginia and an area reaction force mission (ARF) for northern Kuwait. The squadron redeployed and demobilized at Fort Stewart, Georgia in December 2010.

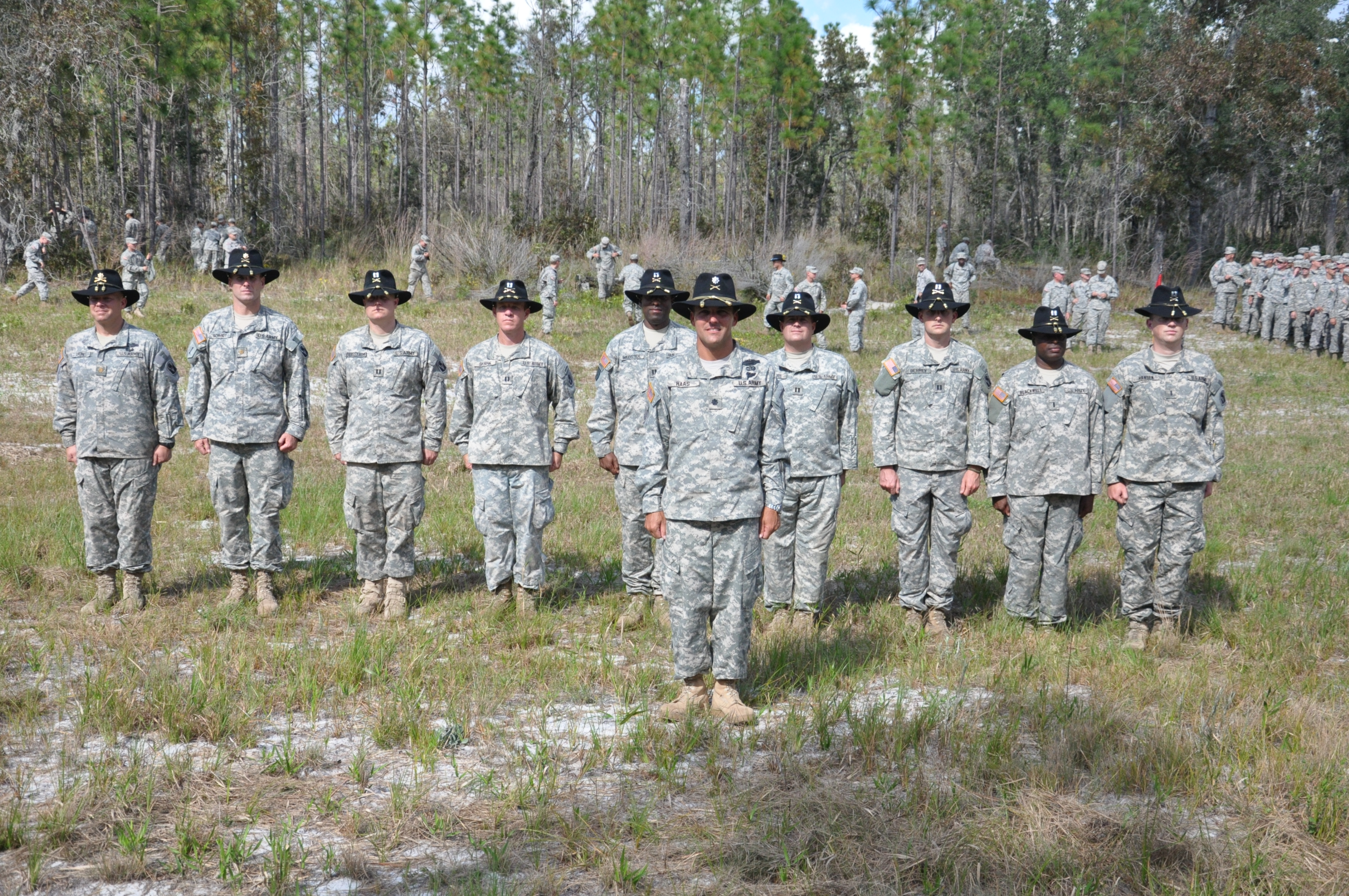
Staff officers of 1st Squadron, 153rd Cavalry at pre-mobilization training at Camp Blanding in October 2009.

In March 2022, 1-153 participated along with 3rd Battalion 157th Field Artillery Regiment and the USAF's 386th Expeditionary Logistics Readiness Squadron in Operation Agile Spartan II from Ali Al Salem Air Base, Kuwait, in a large-scale, joint and multinational operation focused on "Operational Testing & Evaluation of Agile Combat Employment core competencies".

=== Headquarters Troop, 1st Squadron, 153rd Cavalry Regiment ===
The Panama City-based National Guard company, now designated as Headquarters and Headquarters Troop, was first organized on 20 January 1914 as Company M, 1st Florida Infantry Regiment in Panama City under command of Capt. Emmett Cooper. The company was disbanded in November 1916 when the 2nd Florida Infantry Regiment deployed to serve on the Texas-Mexico border and a separate battalion was formed from the remnants of the 1st Florida Infantry Regiment. Company M, 1st Florida Infantry Regiment was reorganized in Millville, a small town across the bayou east of Panama City, in April 1917 under command of Capt. F. M. Turner. They received federal recognition on 4 July 1917. The company of 114 men was drafted into Federal service on 5 August 1917 at Millville and stationed at Camp Wheeler, where they, along with the entire 1st Florida, was broken up to create the 106th Engineers, 116th Field Artillery, 118th Machine Gun Battalion, and 106th Signal Battalion, as well as fill the 124th Infantry. The majority of the Bay County men served in the 106th Engineers, which arrived in Brest, France just before the end of the war. They were demobilized by 31 October 1918 at Camp Gordon, Georgia.

The company was reorganized on 5 December 1922 as a combat engineer unit designated as Company D, 2nd Battalion, 114th Engineer Regiment (39th Division) in Panama City. Seven months later, Florida units were realigned to the 31st Division and the Panama City unit was redesignated on 1 July 1923 as Company D, 2nd Battalion, 106th Engineers. Company D, under command of Capt. Hiram W. Sperry, was inducted into Federal service on 25 November 1940 at Panama City. They spent one year at Camp Blanding before they reorganized and redesignated on 10 February 1942 as Company A, 175th Engineers (General Service), then quickly redesignated on 15 May 1942 as Company A, 177th Engineers (General Service). They shipped to Anchorage, Alaska, where they constructed facilities at Fort Richardson and elsewhere in Alaska for the duration of the war. They were inactivated on 15 November 1944 at Anchorage, Alaska.

The Panama City unit was reorganized and federally recognized on 3 March 1947 as Company C, 124th Infantry. Then reorganized on 1 November 1955 as an armored infantry unit designated as Company C, 124th Armored Infantry Battalion. They were redesignated on 15 April 1959 as Company C, 1st Armored Rifle Battalion, 124th Infantry. The infantry company was reorganized and redesignated on 15 February 1963 as Headquarters and Headquarters Company, 261st Engineer Battalion. The unit consolidated on 20 January 1968 with an engineer platoon from Company A, 261st Engineer Battalion (organized 1 March 1963), and the consolidated unit was designated as Headquarters and Headquarters Company C, 3d Battalion, 124th Infantry. Headquarters and Headquarters Company mobilized in December 2002 and deployed to Kuwait and Iraq along with 3rd Battalion, 124th Infantry. The unit converted, reorganized, and redesignated on 1 September 2007 as Headquarters & Headquarters Troop, 1st Squadron, 153rd Cavalry. Headquarters Troop, under command of Capt. Michael "Shep" Allen, deployed to Camp Buehring, Kuwait, where the Headquarters Troop served as the camp's mayor cell.

=== Troop A, 1st Squadron, 153rd Cavalry Regiment ===
Troop A, 1st Squadron, 153rd Cavalry Regiment is a motorized reconnaissance troop stationed in Bonifay, Florida. The company was first organized in Bonifay on 20 December 1949 as the 144th Transportation Truck Company under command of Capt. Randal M. Stott. The 144th, under command of Capt. Stott, was activated for federal service during the Korean War on 11 September 1950 and stationed at Camp Rucker, Alabama until their release from federal service on 1 April 1952. The company reorganized and redesignated on 2 May 1960 as 314th Ordnance Company (Gas), then reorganized on 1 March 1964 as an armored combat engineer unit designated Company C, 261st Engineer Battalion. The unit converted, reorganized, and redesignated on 20 January 1968 as Det. 1 (Recon, Mortar, and Maintenance Platoons), Headquarters & Headquarters Company, 3rd Battalion, 124th Infantry. The detachment returned to a company-sized element on 3 January 1972 when it was reorganized as Support Company, 2nd Battalion, 124th Infantry. The unit was again reorganized on 2 September 1989 as an infantry heavy weapons company designated as Company D, 3rd Battalion, 124th Infantry. When 3rd Battalion was alerted in December 2002 for the pending invasion of Iraq, the heavy weapons company was not among the alerted companies. The majority of Company D's soldiers were reassigned across the battalion for the 2003 to 2004 deployment. Company D was converted and redesignated as Troop A in 2007 along with the 3rd Battalion's conversion to the squadron. Troop A, under command of Capt. John "Sam" Sargeant, deployed to Kuwait in 2010 where they guarded and operated the Khabari Crossing checkpoint into Iraq. Troop A deployed independently from 1st Squadron, 153rd Cavalry in the spring of 2016, under command of Capt. Justin Howland. They mobilized in April and trained at Fort Bliss and Camp McGregor before deploying to Djibouti, where they were attached to 1st Battalion, 124th Infantry Regiment and secured Chabelly Airfield. Troop A returned home in early 2017.

=== Troop B, 1st Squadron, 153rd Cavalry Regiment ===
Troop B, 1st Squadron, 153rd Cavalry Regiment is a motorized reconnaissance troop stationed in Pensacola, Florida. The company was first organized in DeFuniak Springs, Florida under command of Capt. J. R. Cawthorn on 6 December 1947, during the post-WW II reorganization of the Florida National Guard. In February 1963, Company D, 1st Armored Rifle Battalion, 124th Infantry reorganized as the 267th Engineer Company. In March 1964, the engineer company was redesignated the 153d Engineer Company, minus two engineer platoons stationed in Quincy, Florida. In January 1968, the unit was reorganized into Company B, 3d Battalion, 124th Infantry. The company had a mess team at their home station and a detachment of two rifle platoons in Quincy. On 1 March 1998, Company B was restationed one hour away in Pensacola. Company B deployed to Iraq with the battalion from 2003 to 2004, under the command of Capt. Gil Petruska. Company B was converted and redesignated as Troop B in 2007 along with the 3rd Battalion's conversion to the squadron. Troop B, under the command of Capt. DeWitt Revels, deployed to As Sayliyah Army Base in Qatar in 2010, while the rest of the squadron was deployed to Kuwait. Troop B deployed separately from 1st Squadron, 153rd Cavalry in the summer of 2015, under the command of Capt. Jason Robinson. They mobilized in July and trained at Fort Bliss, Texas and Camp McGregor, New Mexico before deploying to Djibouti, where they were attached to 2nd Battalion, 124th Infantry Regiment and secured the remote Chabelly Airfield. Troop B returned home in the summer of 2016.

=== Troop C, 1st Squadron, 153rd Cavalry Regiment ===
Troop C, 1st Squadron, 153rd Cavalry Regiment is a dismounted reconnaissance troop stationed in Tallahassee, Florida. Troop C has one of the oldest lineages in the Florida National Guard, perpetuating the lineages of the Franklin Guards established in 1836 in Apalachicola and the Governor's Guards established in 1857 in Tallahassee.

=== Troop E, 153rd Cavalry Regiment ===
Troop E, 153rd Cavalry was first organized in Tallahassee in 1964 as the mounted reconnaissance element of the 53rd Armored Brigade. The troop had tanks and armored personnel carriers (APCs). In 1968, a 3rd Infantry battalion was constituted when the 53rd Armored Brigade was re-flagged as the 53rd Infantry Brigade and the Tallahassee unit became Company A, 3rd Battalion, 124th Infantry. In 1987, Troop E was the only armored unit in the State of Florida Army National Guard. The Troop Commander was Captain Sandy Darden. The troop consisted of three armored cavalry platoons each equipped with M48A5 tanks, M901 Improved TOW Vehicles and M113 personnel carriers as well as a 4.2 Inch Mortar Platoon. It was during this time as an armored unit that the 153rd Cavalry's distinctive "Scouts Out" unit crest was designed and approved by the Department of the Army. In the late 1980's this unit transitioned to a light cavalry TO&E and turned in all of its armored vehicles in exchange for Humvees. Troop E was reactivated in Ocala, Florida and deployed to Afghanistan in 2005. The Ocala-based Troop E was consolidated and reorganized as Company C, 2nd Battalion, 124th Infantry during the Brigade Combat Team reformation in 2007. Though Troop E and 1st Squadron share the same coat of arms, 1st Squadron, 153rd Cavalry Regiment was constituted almost entirely from the infantrymen of 3rd Battalion, 124th Infantry and so continue the 3rd Battalion's lineage.

== Organization (2007 – present) ==
| Company | Station |
|---|---|
| Headquarters and Headquarters Troop (HHT), 1-153rd Cavalry | Panama City, Florida |
| Troop A, 1-153rd Cavalry (Motorized Reconnaissance Troop) | Bonifay, Florida |
| Troop B, 1-153rd Cavalry (Motorized Reconnaissance Troop) | Pensacola, Florida |
| Troop C, 1-153rd Cavalry (Dismounted Reconnaissance Troop) | Tallahassee, Florida |
| Delta Company, Forward Support Company (FSC), 53rd Brigade Support Battalion | Chipley, Florida |

== Decorations ==
| Ribbon | Award | Streamer embroidered | Order No. | Note | Unit Awarded |
|---|---|---|---|---|---|
| Dark blue ribbon with a gold border | Presidential Unit Citation (Army) | NEW GUINEA 1944 | | Awarded to 3d Battalion, 124th Infantry during World War II. | Troop C |
| Dark blue ribbon with a gold border | Presidential Unit Citation (Army) | IRAQ 2003 | Permanent Orders 110-15, 20 April 2009 | Awarded to 3d Battalion, 124th Infantry for service in the invasion of Iraq. | 153d Cavalry Regiment |
| blue, yellow, and red horizontal stripes | Presidential Unit Citation (Navy) | IRAQ 2003 | Permanent Orders 100-25, 9 April 2008 | Awarded to 3d Battalion, 124th Infantry for service in the invasion of Iraq. | 153d Cavalry Regiment |
| Army Superior Unit Award ribbon | Superior Unit Award | 2015-2016 | Permanent Order 128-001, 8 May 2017 | Awarded to Troop B for their deployment to Djibouti. | Troop B |
| | Philippine Presidential Unit Citation | 17 OCTOBER 1944 TO 4 JULY 1945 | | Awarded to 3d Battalion, 124th Infantry for their service in liberating the Philippines. | 153d Cavalry Regiment |
| | Florida Governor's Meritorious Unit Citation | 2003 | | Awarded to 3d Battalion, 124th Infantry for their deployment to Iraq. | 153d Cavalry Regiment |
| | Florida Governor's Meritorious Unit Citation | 2010 | | Awarded to 1st Squadron, 153d Cavalry for their deployment to Kuwait. | 153d Cavalry Regiment |

== Campaign participation credit ==
153d Cavalry Regiment:

World War I

- Streamer without Inscription

World War II

- New Guinea (with arrowhead)
- Southern Philippines

War on Terrorism

- Global War on Terrorism
- Liberation of Iraq
- Transition of Iraq

Headquarters Troop (Panama City) additionally entitled to:

World War II

- Aleutian Islands

Troop C (Tallahassee) additionally entitled to:

Indian Wars

- Creeks
- Seminoles

World War II

- Aleutian Islands

Southwest Asia

- Defense of Saudi Arabia
- Liberation and Defense of Kuwait
- Cease-Fire

== Commanders ==
LTC Jay Hall, 124th Armored Rifle Battalion, circa 1950s-January 1959

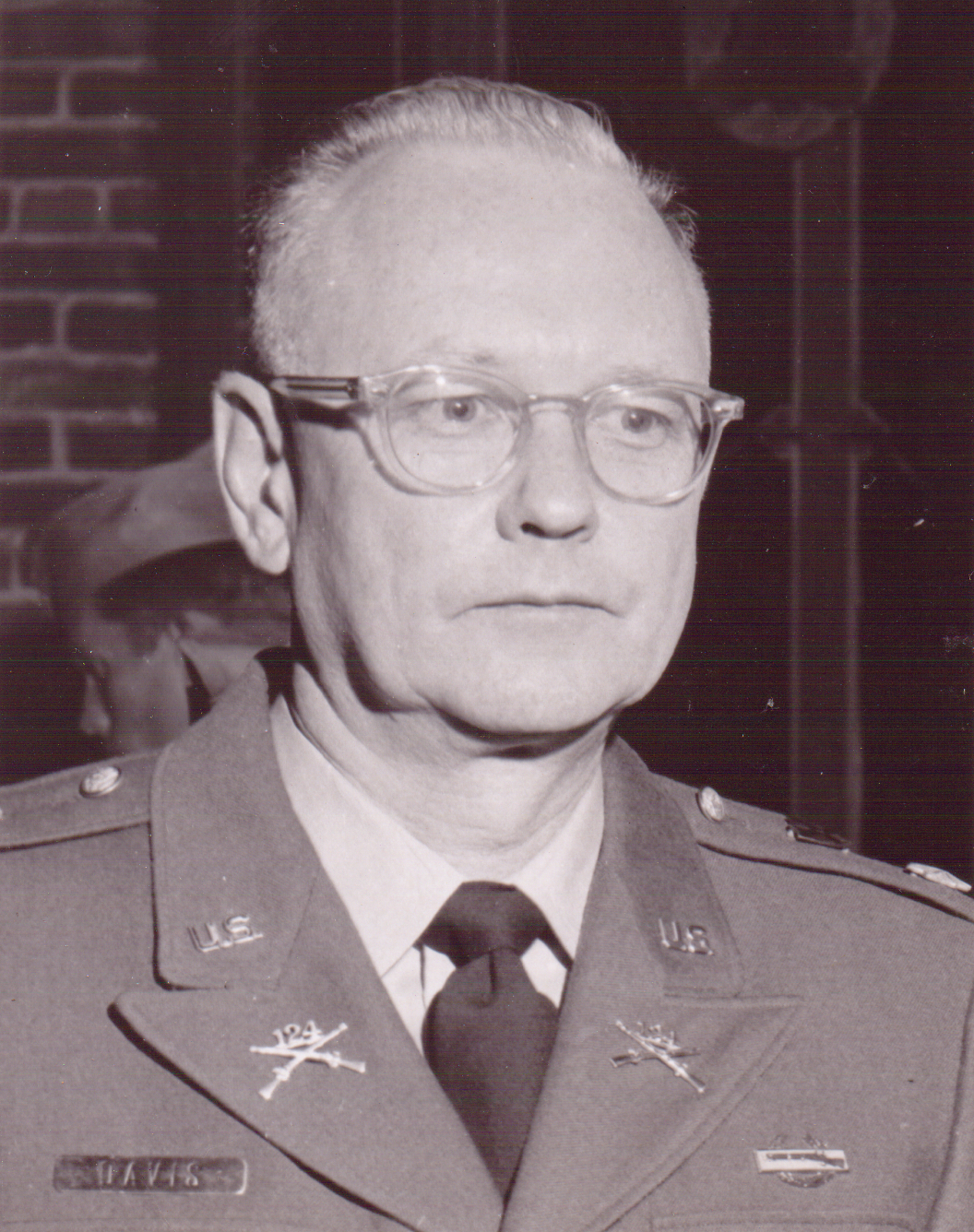
LTC Ralph C. Davis, 124th Armored Rifle Battalion, circa January 1959 – 1960

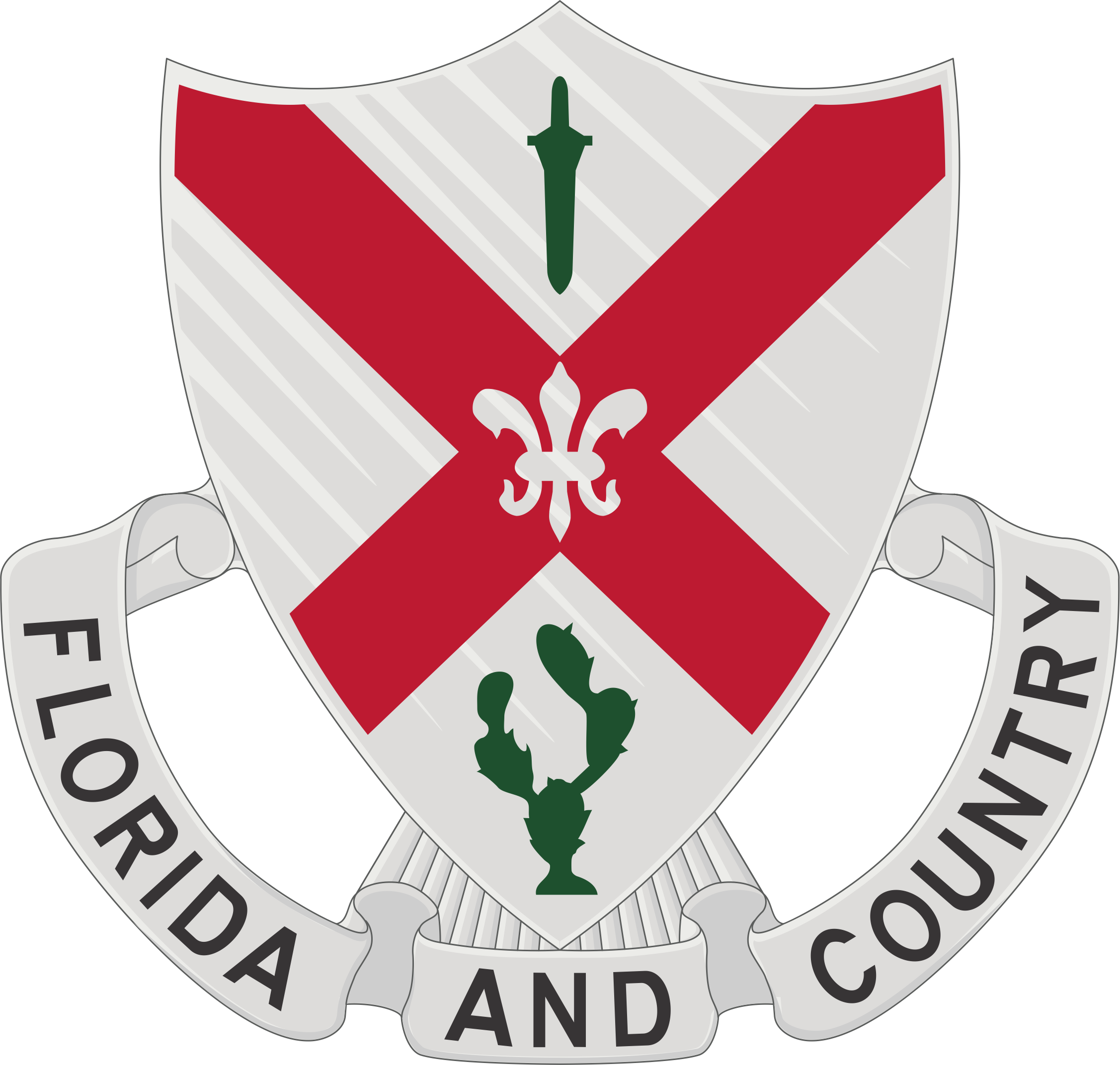
LTC Lawrence Watson, 124th Armored Rifle Battalion, circa 1966

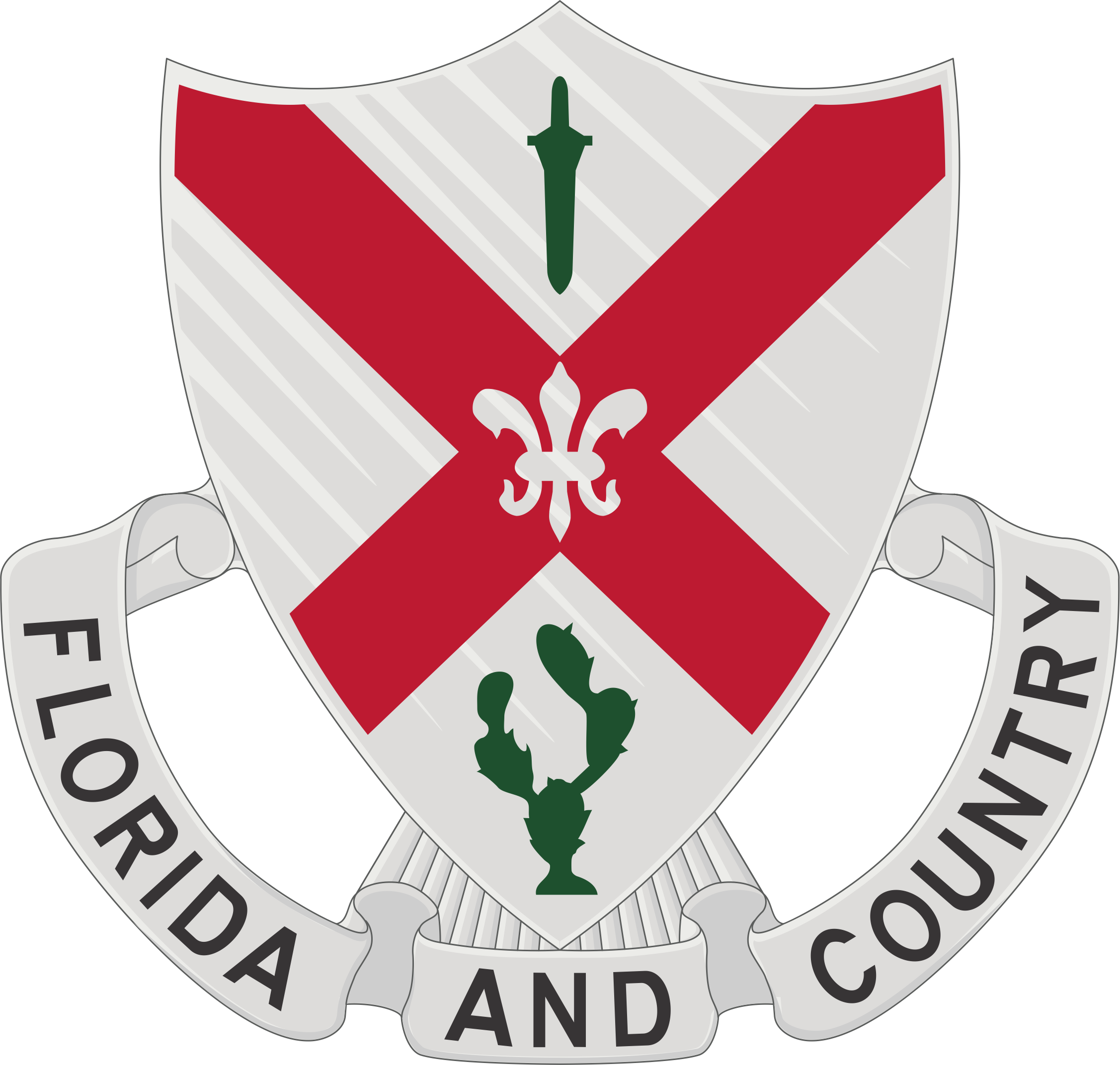
LTC Robert L. Howell, 3-124 Infantry, 1966-1972

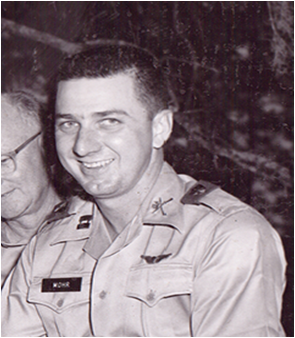
LTC Charles G. Mohr, 3-124 Infantry, 1973

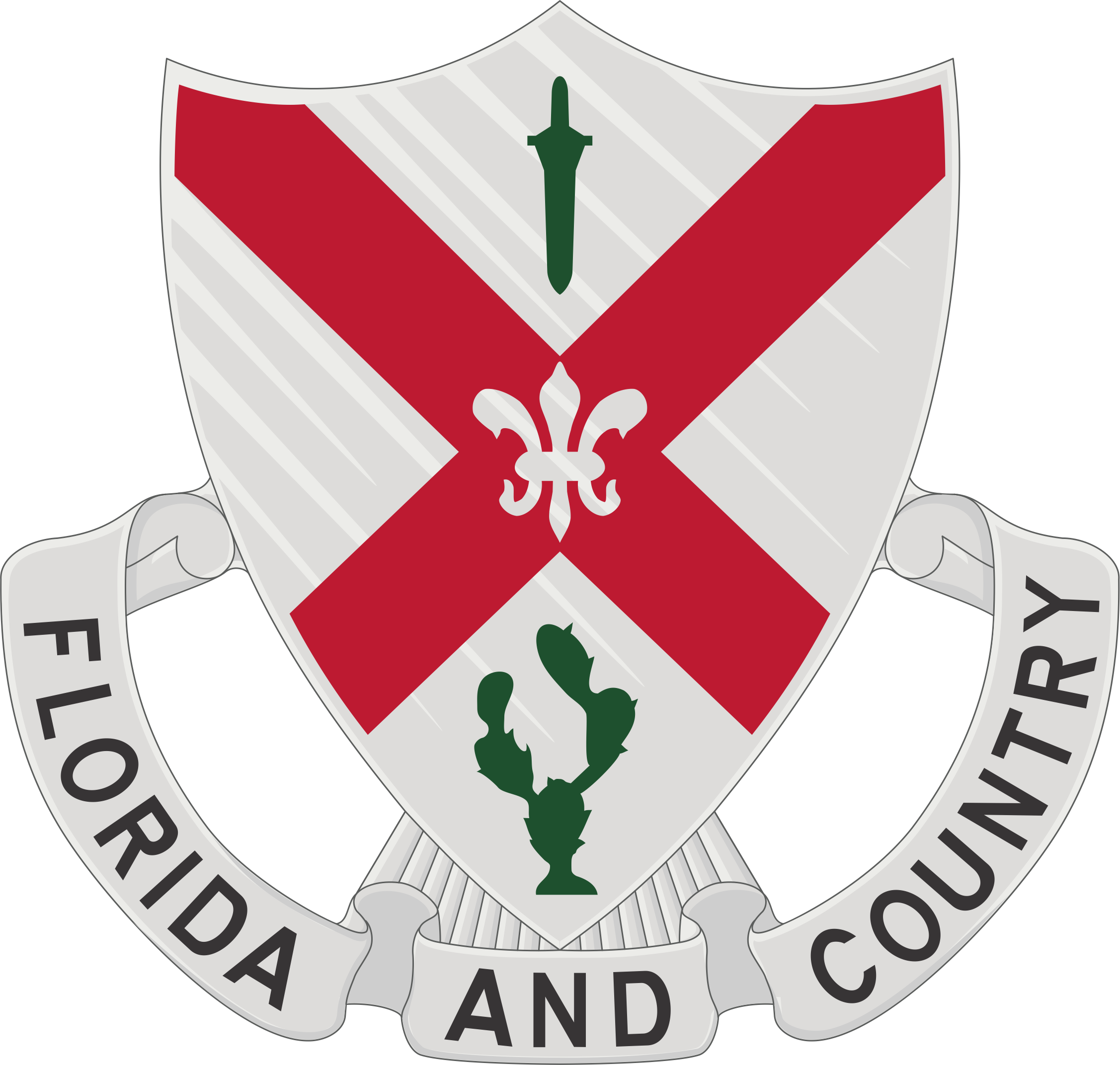
LTC Claude McLeod, 3-124 Infantry, 1976

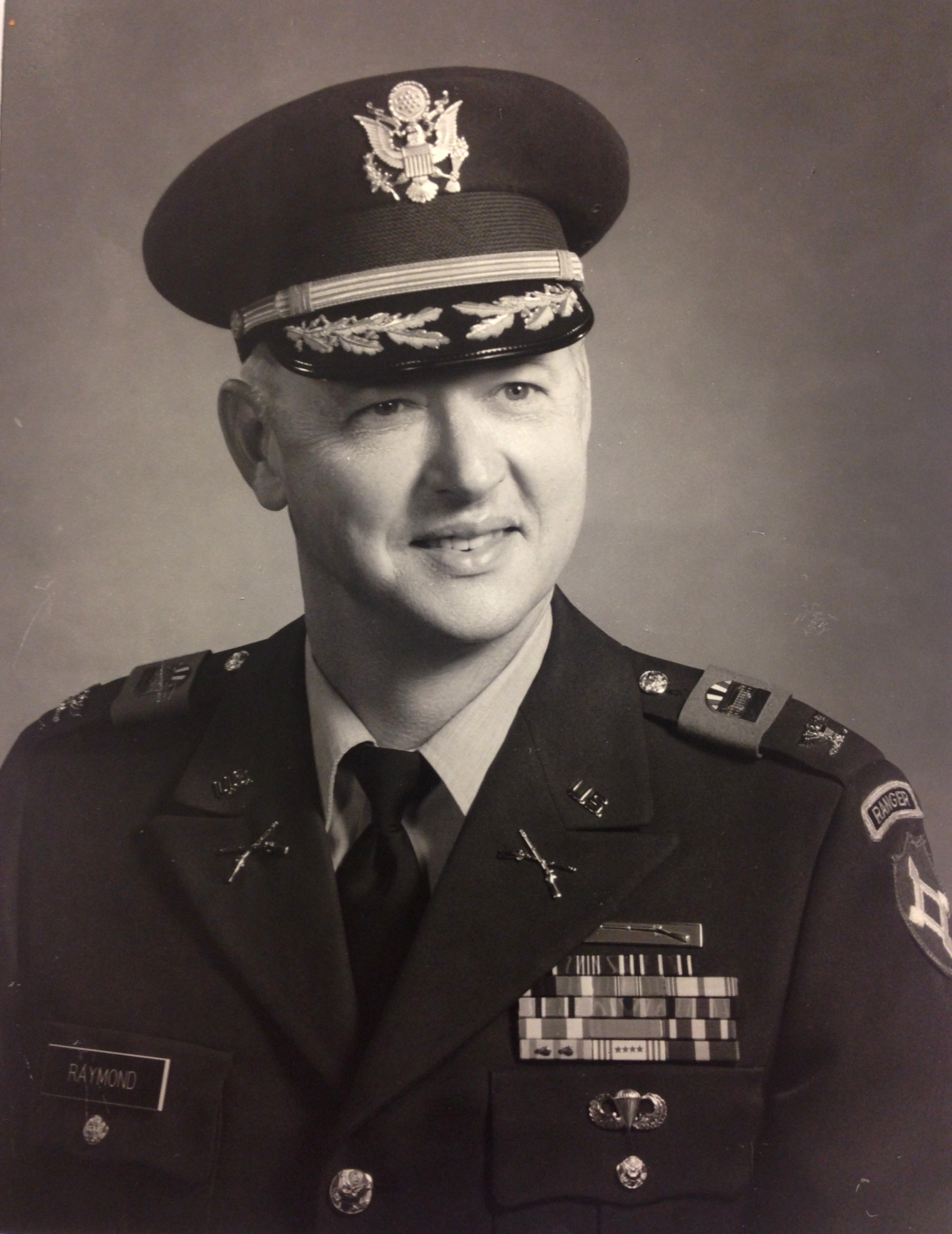
LTC Harry J. Raymond, 3-124 Infantry, 1983

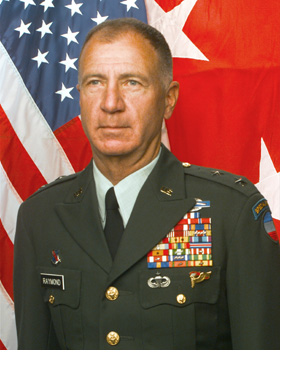
LTC Frederic J. Raymond, 3-124 Infantry, October 1989 – August 1991

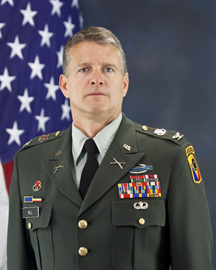
LTC Thad W. Hill, 3-124 Infantry, Iraq invasion, 2003–2004

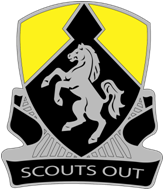
LTC Michael Atwell, 3-124 Infantry thru transition to 1-153 Cavalry, 2005–2007

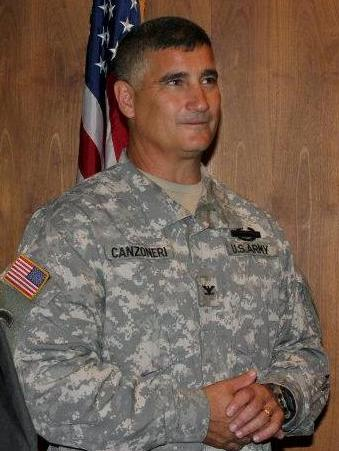
LTC Mike Canzoneri, 1-153 Cavalry, 2007–2009

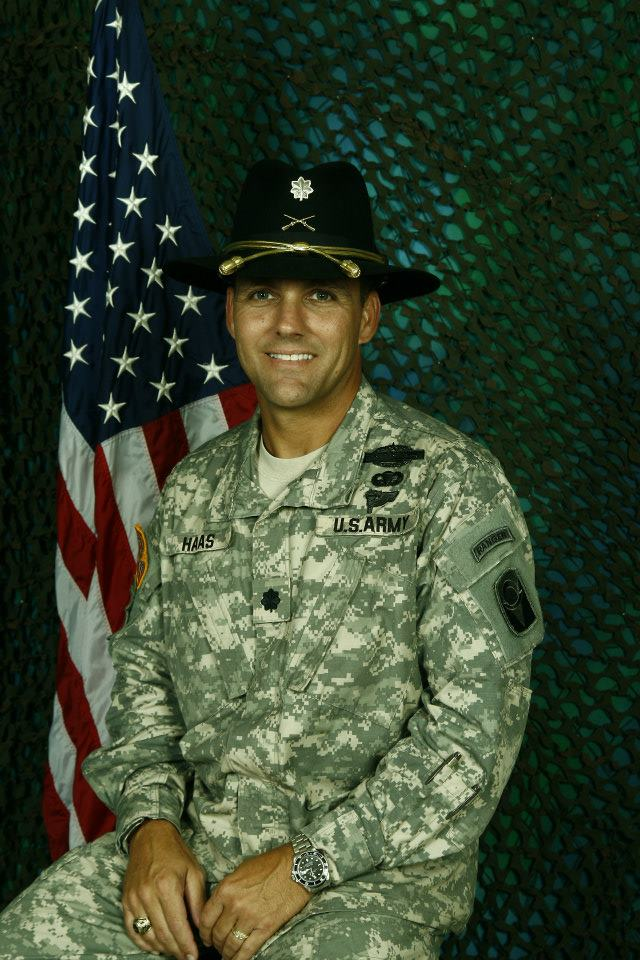
LTC John D. Haas, 1-153 Cavalry, 2009–2012

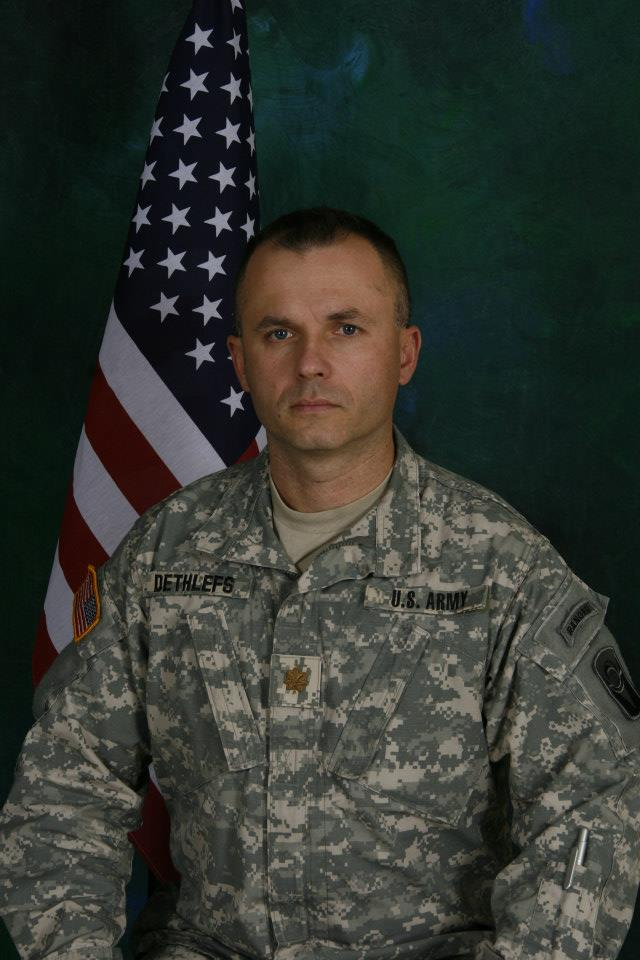
LTC John E. Dethlefs, 1-153 Cavalry, 2012–2013

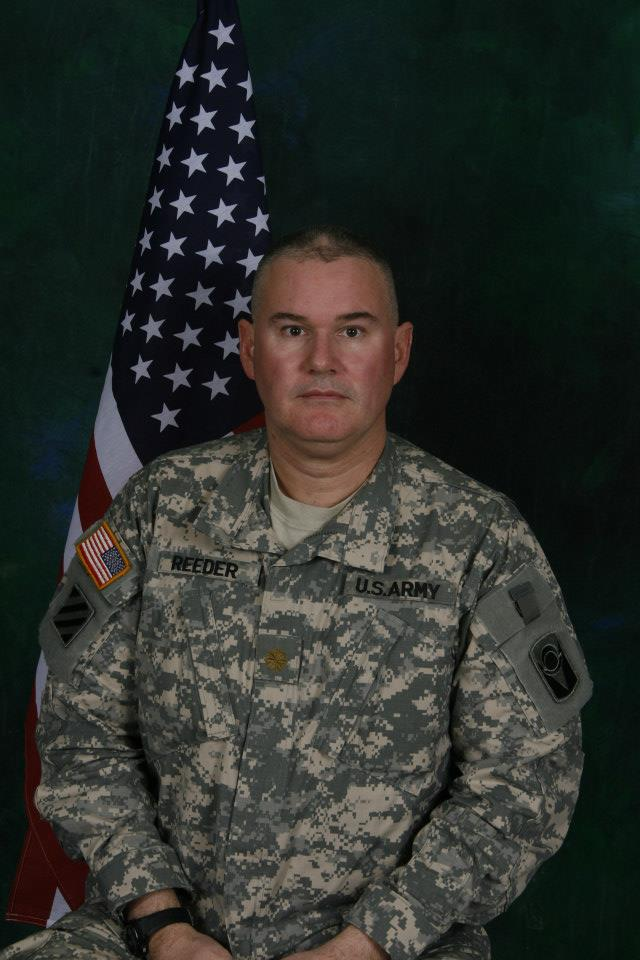
LTC David A. Reeder, 1-153 Cavalry, 2013–2016

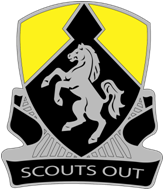
LTC Ernesto J. Torres, 1-153 Cavalry, 2016–2018

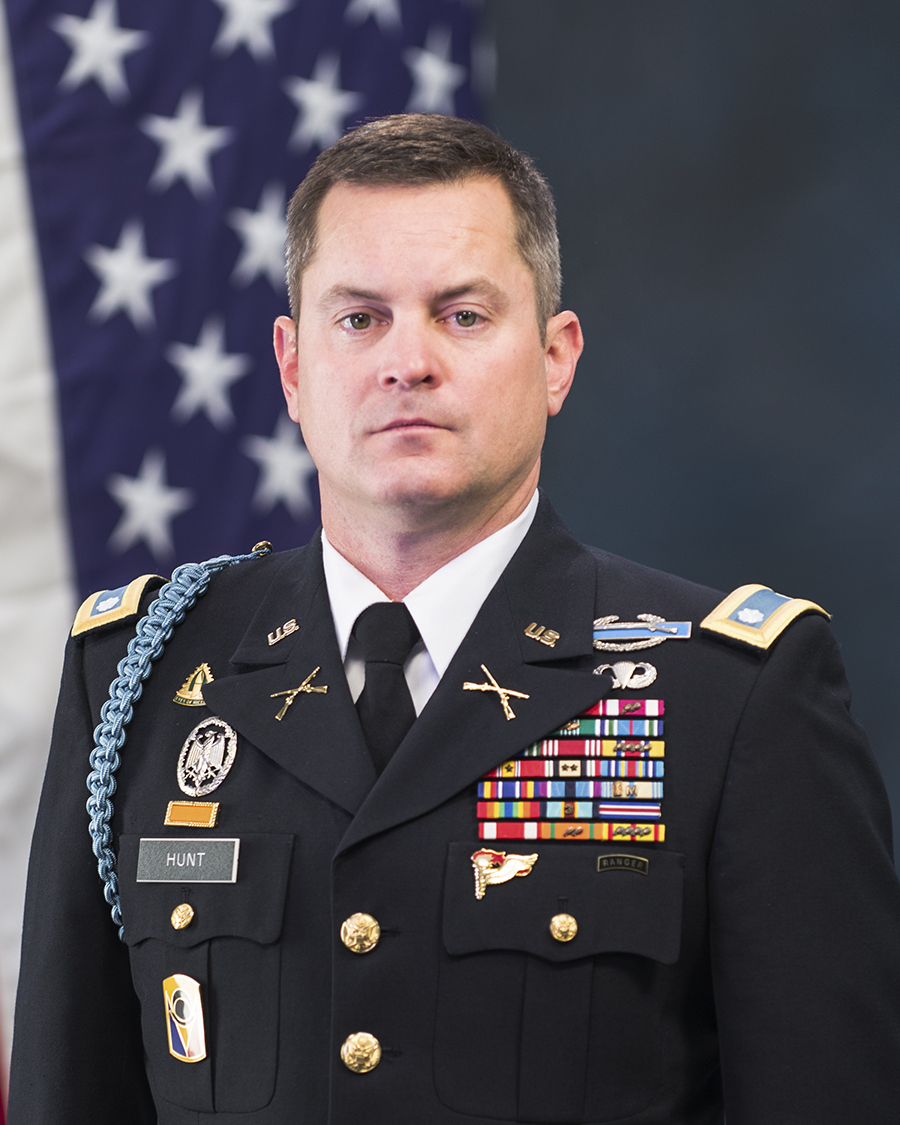
LTC Jason M. Hunt, 1-153 Cavalry, 2018 - Nov. 2019

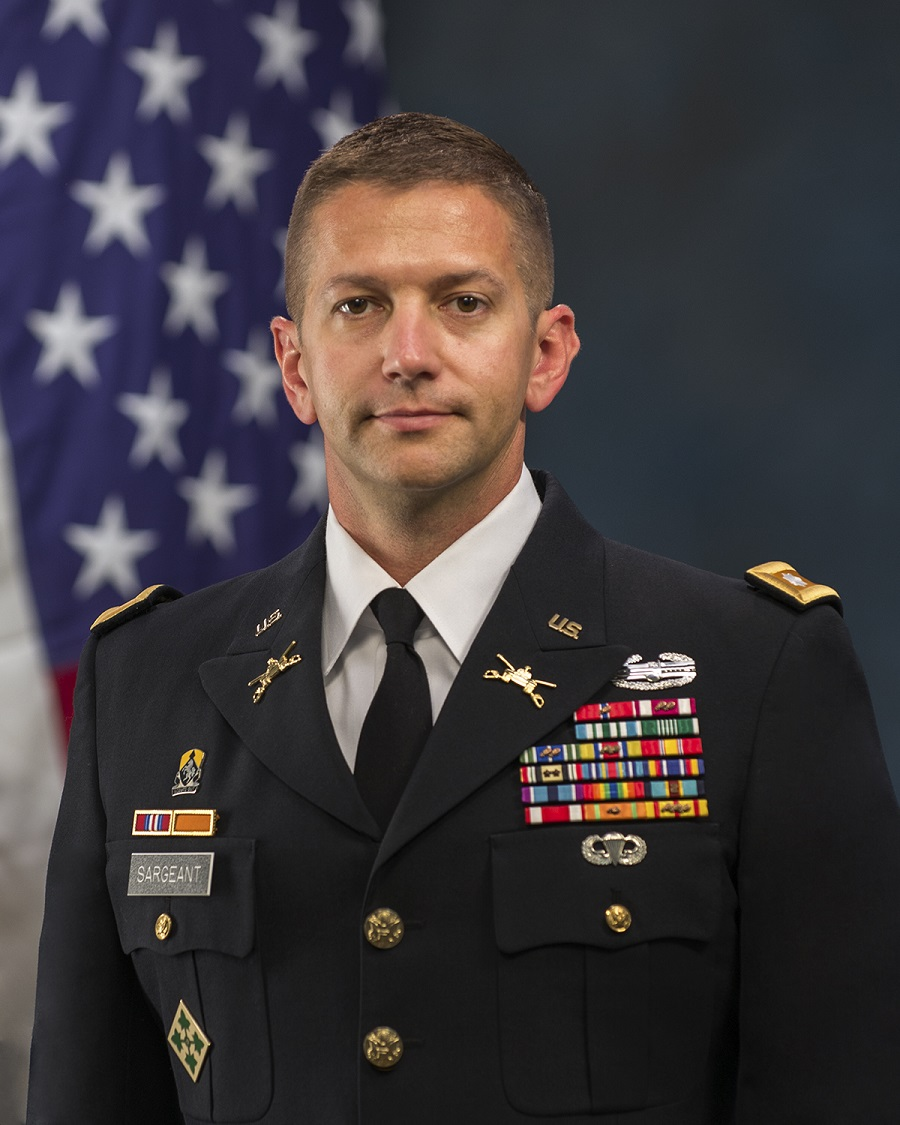
LTC John "Sam" Sargeant, 1-153 Cavalry, Nov. 2019 – Oct. 2022

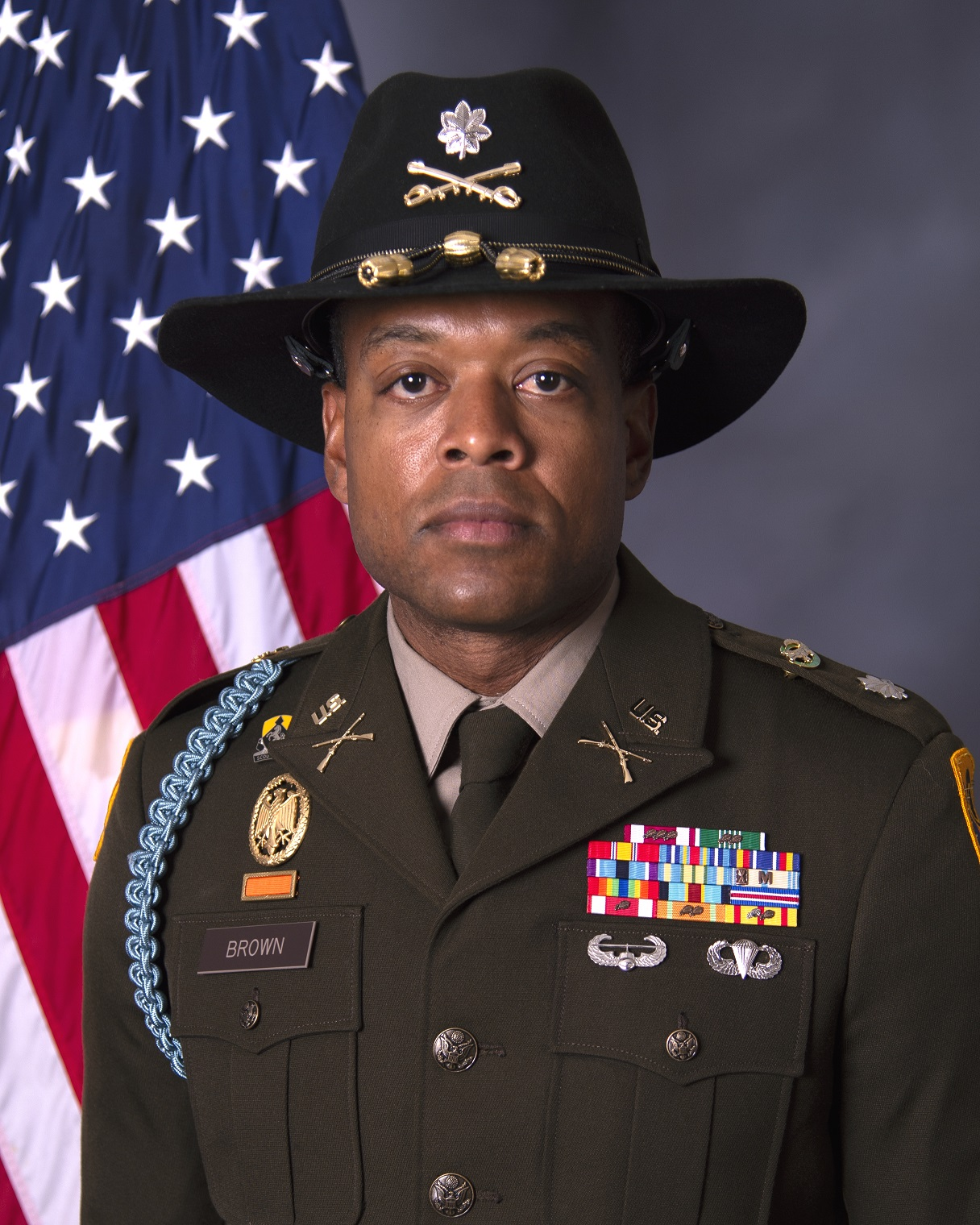
LTC Daniel Brown, 1-153 Cavalry, Oct. 2022 – present

== Command Sergeants Major ==
- CSM Virgil L. Robinson, 2007-2011
- CSM Patrick Burtschell, 2011–2015
- CSM Robert L. Ponder, II, 2015–2018
- CSM Thomas M. Williford (Tommy), February 2018 - August 2018
- CSM Paul J. McGarr, 2018–2021
- CSM Thomas M. Willford (Tommy), 2021–Aug. 2024
- CSM Dale Thompson, Aug. 2024–present

== See also ==
- Troop C, 1-153 Cavalry
- 124th Infantry Regiment (United States)
- 53rd Infantry Brigade Combat Team
- Florida Army National Guard
