= GSAB =

GSAB may mean:

- General Support Aviation Battalion, a unit in the US Army's Combat Aviation Brigades, for example, 168th Aviation Regiment (United States)
- Geological Society of America Bulletin
