= Cabal (disambiguation) =

A cabal is a group of people united in some design.

Cabal or the Cabal may also refer to:

== Organizations ==
- The Cabal ministry, a group of high councillors of King Charles II of England
- Cabal (band), a Danish deathcore band
- Cabal (political party), a Guatemalan political party
- The Cabal (set theory), an American group of set theorists
- The backbone cabal, a group of administrators on Usenet
- The Conway Cabal, a group of senior Continental Army officers

== Arts and entertainment ==
=== Comics and literature ===
- The Cabal (comics), a fictional secret society in the Marvel Universe
- The Cabal (DC Comics), a fictional criminal organization in the DC Universe
- Cabal (Dibdin novel), a 1992 novel by Michael Dibdin
- Cabal (novella), a 1988 novella by Clive Barker
- The Cabal, a fictional secret society in Robert Heinlein's novella "If This Goes On—"

=== Games ===
- Cabal (video game), a 1988 video game by TAD Corporation
- Cabal Online, a 2005 video game by ESTsoft
- Cabals: Magic & Battle Cards, a 2011 video game by Kyy Games
- Computer Assisted Biologically Augmented Lifeform (CABAL), a fictional artificial intelligence in the video game Command & Conquer: Tiberian Sun and its expansion pack Firestorm
- GURPS Cabal, a supplement for the GURPS role-playing game
- The Cabal, a fictional cult in the video game Blood
- The Cabal, a fictional resistance movement in the video game Blood Omen 2
- The Cabal, a fictional empire in the video game series Destiny
- The Cabal, a fictional secret society in the video game Tomb Raider: The Angel of Darkness

=== Television ===
- The Cabal (The Blacklist), a fictional organization in the TV series The Blacklist
- The Cabal, a fictional organization in the TV series Sanctuary
- The Cabal, a fictional organization in the Temporal Cold War in the TV series Star Trek: Enterprise

== Other uses ==
- Cabal (dog), the Latin name of King Arthur's dog, whose Welsh name is Cavall
- Cabal (software), a packaging manager for the Haskell programming language
- Cabal (surname), a Spanish and French surname
- Santa Rosa de Cabal, a town and municipality in the Risaralda Department, Colombia

== See also ==
- Cabala (disambiguation)
- Cabalist (disambiguation)
- Cable (disambiguation)
- Kabal (disambiguation)
