= Cabala =

Cabala (alternately Kabbala(h) or Qabala(h)) may refer to:

== Religion ==
- Kabbalah (קַבָּלָה), an esoteric method, discipline, and school of thought in Jewish mysticism
  - Lurianic Kabbalah, a school of Kabbalah named after Isaac Luria
  - Meditative Kabbalah, a meditative tradition within Jewish Kabbalah
  - Practical Kabbalah, a branch of the Jewish mystical tradition that concerns the use of magic
  - Prophetic Kabbalah, or Ecstatic Kabbalah, Abraham Abulafia's school of Meditative Kabbalah
- Christian Kabbalah, a Christian interpretation of Jewish Kabbalah
- Hermetic Qabalah, a Western esoteric tradition involving mysticism and the occult
  - English Qabalah, various systems of English numerology related to Hermetic Qabalah that interpret the letters of the Latin script or English alphabet via an assigned set of numerical values
  - English Qaballa, a system of Hermetic Qabalah, based on a system of numerology that interprets the letters of the English alphabet via an assigned set of values

== Other uses ==
- Battle of Cabala (c. 379 BC), a battle between Carthage and Syracuse in Sicily
- Ivan Čabala (born 1960), Slovak footballer
- Qabala District, Azerbaijan
  - Qabala, a city and municipality in Azerbaijan
- The Cabala, a 1926 novel by Thornton Wilder
- Kabbalah: Mythic Judaism, a supplement published by Atlas Games in 1997 for the role-playing game Ars Magica

== See also ==
- Cabal (disambiguation)
- Cabalist (disambiguation)
- Hasidic philosophy, theological and mystical teachings of Hasidic Judaism
- Kabala (disambiguation)
- Kabbala (disambiguation)
