= Karbala (disambiguation) =

Karbala is a city in central Iraq.

Karbala may also refer to:

== Places ==
=== India ===
- Karbala, Kollam

=== Iran ===
- Karbala, Iran
- Karbala, Zanjan

=== Turkey ===
- Karbala (Cappadocia)

== Other ==
- Karbala (film), a 2015 Polish film
- Karbala (song), a song by Zubeen Garg

== See also ==
- Battle of Karbala (disambiguation)
- Kabala (disambiguation)
