= Kavala (disambiguation) =

Kavala is a seaport city in northern Greece

Kavala may also refer to:

- Kavala (regional unit), a regional unit of Greece that is part of East Macedonia and Thrace
- Kavala (constituency), electoral district
- Kavala B.C., a basketball club based in the Greek city
- Kavala F.C., an association football club based in the Greek city
- Kavala Island, in Lake Tanganyika, Africa
- Kavala Prefecture, a former prefecture of Greece, established in 1915 and disestablished in 2011
- Osman Kavala (born 1957), Turkish businessman and philanthropist

== See also ==
- Cavalla (disambiguation)
- Kabala (disambiguation)
- "Kaavaalaa", a 2023 song by Indian singer Shilpa Rao
