= USS Cavalla (SSN-684) =

Sturgeon class submarine

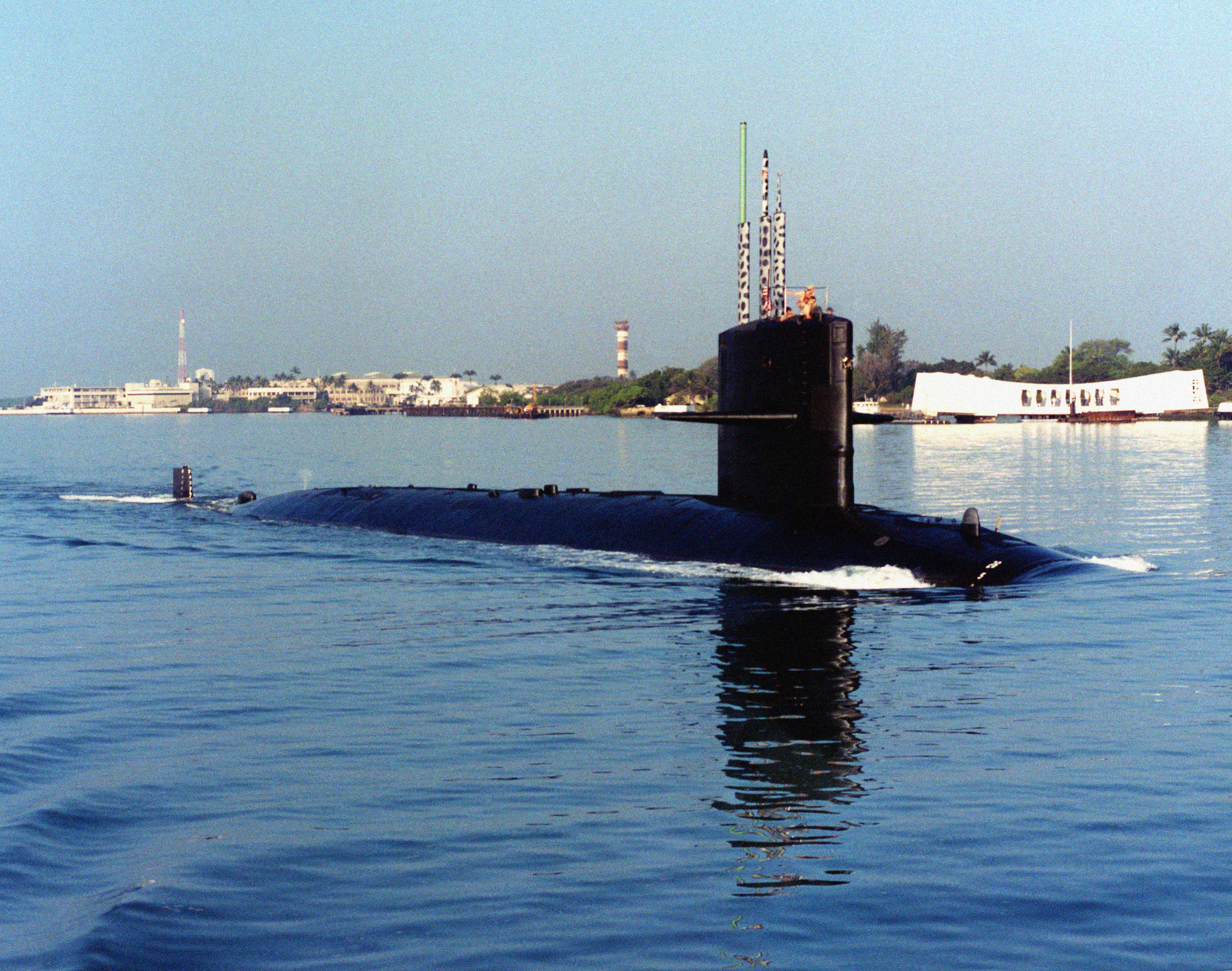
- USS Cavalla (SSN-684) entering the harbor at Naval Station Pearl Harbor, Hawaii, on 1 January 1997 with Ford Island and the Arizona Memorial in the background.

History

United States
- Name: USS Cavalla (SSN-684)
- Namesake: The cavalla, a salt-water fish
- Ordered: 24 July 1968
- Builder: General Dynamics Electric Boat, Groton, Connecticut
- Laid down: 4 June 1970
- Launched: 19 February 1972
- Sponsored by: Mrs. Melvin Price
- Commissioned: 9 February 1973
- Decommissioned: 30 March 1998
- Stricken: 30 March 1998
- Motto: Any Mission, Any Time
- Honors and awards: Meritorious Unit Commendation
- Fate: Scrapping via Ship and Submarine Recycling Program completed 17 November 2000

General characteristics
- Class & type: Sturgeon-class attack submarine
- Displacement: 4,193 long tons (4,260 t) light; 4,498 long tons (4,570 t) full; 305 long tons (310 t) dead
- Length: 302 ft 3 in (92.13 m)
- Beam: 31 ft 8 in (9.65 m)
- Draft: 28 ft 8 in (8.74 m)
- Installed power: 15,000 shaft horsepower (11.2 megawatts)
- Propulsion: One S5W nuclear reactor, two steam turbines, one screw
- Speed: 15 knots (28 km/h; 17 mph) surfaced; 25 knots (46 km/h; 29 mph) submerged
- Test depth: 1,300 feet (396 meters)
- Complement: 110 (12 officers, 98 enlisted men)
- Armament: 4 × 21-inch (533 mm) torpedo tubes

USS Cavalla (SSN-684), a Sturgeon-class submarine, was the second ship of the United States Navy to be named for the cavalla, a salt water fish. Although it was a Sturgeon class design, Cavalla was a modified "long hull" boat, approximately 10 feet (3.0 m) longer than the earlier ships in its class.

== Construction and commissioning ==
The contract to build Cavalla was awarded to the Electric Boat Division of General Dynamics Corporation in Groton, Connecticut, on 24 July 1968 and her keel was laid down there on 4 June 1970. She was launched on 19 February 1972 sponsored by Mrs. Melvin Price, and commissioned on 9 February 1973, with Commander (later Admiral) Bruce DeMars in command.

== Service history ==
Arrival at Pearl Harbor, 1980

Cavalla operated as part of Submarine Squadron Ten from January 1974 to March 1975, then with Submarine Development Squadron 12 at Submarine Base New London (Groton, CT) until 1978.

In October 1978, Cavalla arrived as part of the Pacific Submarine force, and in November 1978 entered the Puget Sound Naval Shipyard for a refit lasting until March 1980, when she moved to her new home port at Submarine Base Pearl Harbor at Pearl Harbor, Hawaii, where she was assigned to Submarine Squadron 1. Her operations from Pearl Harbor covered the globe, including the Atlantic, Pacific, Indian, and Arctic Oceans.

During her 1981 Westpac cruise ( January–June ) under Commander Fredric W. Rohm USN, Cavalla visited HMAS Stirling in Rockingham, Western Australia, for R&R from 15 to 22 April 1981.

In 1983 Cavalla became the first submarine to successfully perform dry deck shelter operations, employing a tank attached to the after deck of the submarine allowing personnel to leave the submarine while submerged.

During her Western Pacific deployment of 1985–1986, Cavalla supported critical dry deck shelter operations for SEAL team certification. She was awarded the Meritorious Unit Commendation for these operations. In addition to this award, her crew members also earned various U.S. Navy ceremonial certificates during this same deployment: "shellback" status for crossing the equator, the Order of the Ditch on two occasions for transiting the Panama Canal, the Domain of the Golden Dragon on two occasions for crossing the International Date Line, and the Order of the Spanish Main for operating in the Caribbean Sea.

In 1995, Cavalla deployed to the Arctic Ocean for civilian scientific research.

In 1996, Cavalla participated in the very first joint American-Japanese deep submergence rescue vehicle operation.

== Decommissioning and disposal ==
Cavalla was decommissioned on 30 March 1998 and stricken from the Naval Vessel Register the same day. Her scrapping via the Nuclear-Powered Ship and Submarine Recycling Program at Puget Sound Naval Shipyard in Bremerton, Washington, was completed on 17 November 2000.
