= Cavalla =

Cavalla may refer to:

== Fish ==
- A vernacular name used for several fish species in the families Carangidae and Scombridae:
  - Caranx
    - Crevalle jack Caranx hippos (cavalla)
    - Bar jack Carangoides ruber (blue striped cavalla)
  - Scomber
    - Atlantic mackerel Scomber scombrus (cavalla)
    - Chub mackerel Scomber japonicus (cavalla vera)
  - Carangoides
    - Blue trevally Carangoides ferdau (Ferdau's cavalla)
    - Longnose trevally Carangoides chrysophrys (long nose cavalla)
    - Longfin trevally Carangoides armatus (long fin cavalla)
    - Malabar trevally Carangoides malabaricus (Malabar cavalla)
    - Whitefin trevally Carangoides equula (white fin cavalla)

== Other uses ==
- USS Cavalla, the name of two U.S. Navy submarines
- Cavalla River, in West Africa

== See also ==
- Kavala (disambiguation)
