= USS Cavalla =

Two submarines of the United States Navy have been named USS Cavalla, after the cavalla, a fish of the pompano family.

- USS Cavalla (SS-244), was a Gato-class submarine, commissioned in 1944, served until 1969, and is a museum ship at the American Undersea Warfare Center (AUWC) collocated at Seawolf Park in Galveston, Texas.
- USS Cavalla (SSN-684), was a Sturgeon-class attack submarine commissioned in 1973 and in service until 1998.
