= Kabbala =

Kabbala may refer to:

- Kabbalah, an esoteric school of thought in Jewish mysticism
- Kabbala Denudata, a 1677 book by Christian Knorr von Rosenroth
- Kabbala, Karnataka, a village in India

== See also ==
- Cabala (disambiguation)
- Kabala (disambiguation)
