= Bruce DeMars =

American admiral (1935–2024)

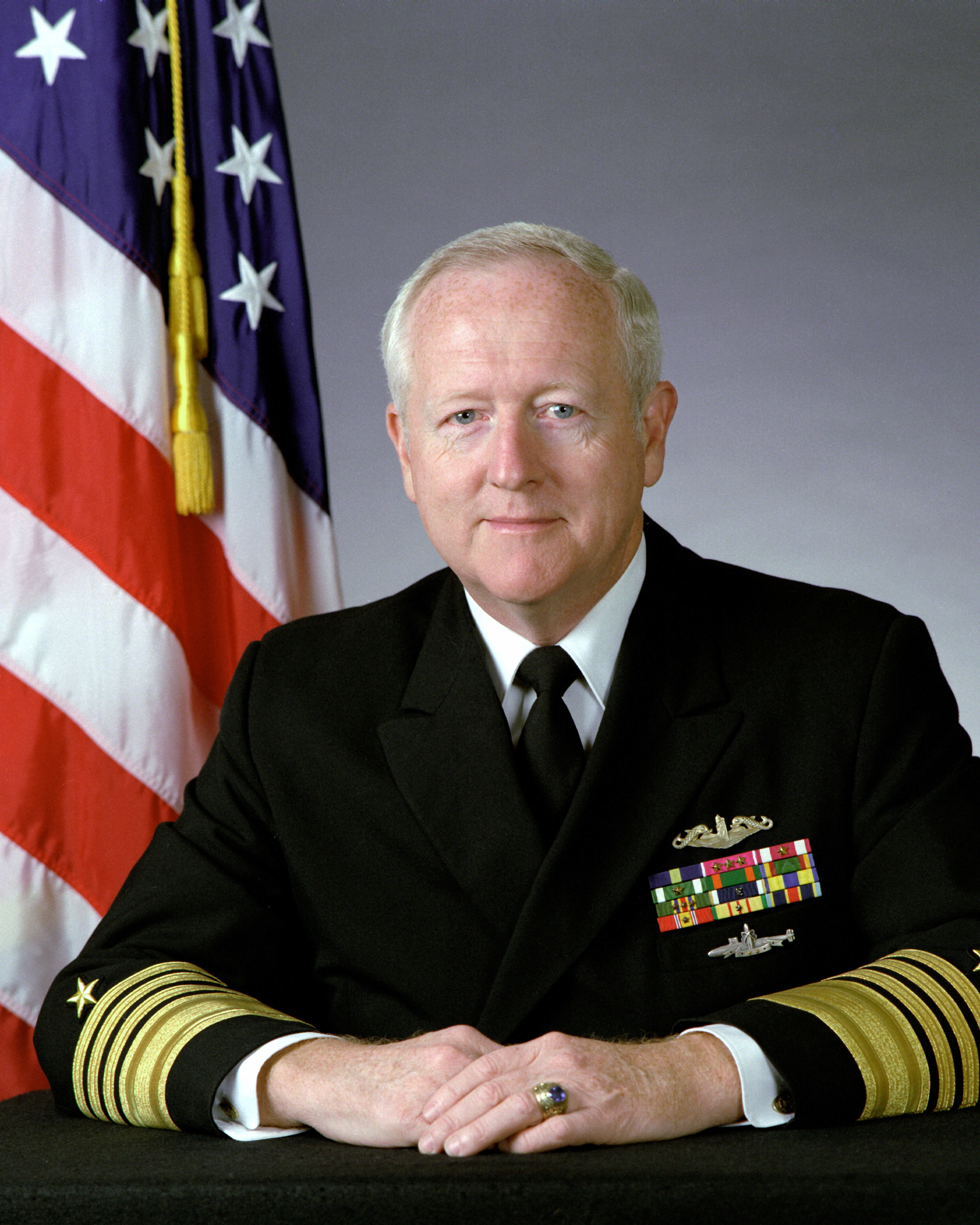
- DeMars in 1988
- Born: June 3, 1935; Chicago, Illinois, U.S.
- Died: February 3, 2024 (aged 88); Alexandria, Virginia, U.S.
- Military career
- Allegiance: United States of America
- Branch: United States Navy
- Service years: 1957–1996
- Rank: Admiral
- Commands: Director, Naval Nuclear Propulsion; USS Cavalla (SSN-684)
- Conflicts: Vietnam War
- Awards: Navy Distinguished Service Medal; Legion of Merit (4)

Bruce DeMars (June 3, 1935 – February 3, 2024) was a United States Navy four star admiral who served as Director, Naval Nuclear Propulsion from 1988 to 1996.

== Early years ==
DeMars was born in Chicago, Illinois, on June 3, 1935, and graduated from the United States Naval Academy in 1957.

== Naval service ==
After graduation, he initially served aboard the surface ships USS Telfair (APA-210) and USS Okanogan (APA-220) before attending Submarine School.

=== Submarine service ===
His first submarine assignment was the diesel USS Capitaine (SS-336). He underwent nuclear power training, followed by assignment to the nuclear-powered submarines USS George Washington (SSBN-598), USS Snook (SSN-592), and USS Sturgeon (SSN-637) before taking command of USS Cavalla (SSN-684).

His shore duty stations include being an instructor at the Nuclear Power School and Submarine School and attending the Armed Forces Staff College. After staff duty with Squadron Ten, DeMars served as Senior Member of the Nuclear Propulsion Examining Board, United States Atlantic Fleet.

DeMars commanded Submarine Development Squadron Twelve in New London, Connecticut and then served as deputy director, Attack Submarine Division in the Office of the Chief of Naval Operations, until selected for promotion to Rear Admiral in 1981.

=== Flag assignments ===
His flag assignments include Commander, U.S. Naval Forces Marianas/Commander, U.S. Naval Base, Guam; Commander in Chief, Pacific Representative for Guam and the Trust Territory of the Pacific Islands; and Deputy Assistant Chief and then Deputy Chief of Naval Operations for Submarine Warfare.

DeMars was confirmed by the United States Senate on September 30, 1988, for promotion to full admiral and on October 22, 1988, he relieved Admiral Kinnaird R. McKee as Director, Naval Nuclear Propulsion.

== Retirement and death ==
DeMars retired on October 1, 1996. He died in Alexandria, Virginia, on February 3, 2024, at the age of 88.

== Honors and awards ==
DeMars' decorations include:

the U.S. Naval Academy Alumni Association Distinguished Graduate Award

- Navy Distinguished Service Medal
- Legion of Merit with three award stars
- Meritorious Service Medal with award star
- Navy and Marine Corps Commendation Medal
- Navy and Marine Corps Achievement Medal
- Navy Unit Commendation.

In 2011, ADM DeMars received the Ellis Island Medal of Honor for his distinguished service to his country.
