= Camp New York =

US military installation in Kuwait

- Kuwait

Site information
- Type: Holding Area
- Owner: United States DOD
- Controlled by: United States
- Open to the public: No
- Condition: Unknown

Location
- Coordinates: 29.4409602°N 47.4661438°E
- Area: ~1 sqmi
- Height: >12 ft

Site history
- Built: After 1991
- Built for: Staging area for Camp Buehring
- Built by: 4th Infantry Division
- Architect: US Army Corps of Engineers
- Materials: HESCO barriers
- Fate: Unknown
- Demolished: No
- Battles/wars: 1991 Gulf War, 2003 Invasion of Iraq

Garrison information
- Current commander: Unknown
- Past commanders: Unknown
- Garrison: 4th Infantry Division
- Designations: Kabal(s)

Camp New York is a United States military installation in Kuwait.

Located in the Udairi Range Complex, Camp New York is a staging post with a close proximity to Camp Buehring. It has been open and closed several times since 2004, and is currently used primarily to handle personnel influxes that nearby Camp Buehring would be unable to accommodate.

== Amenities ==
Following its opening, Camp New York would possess amenities supporting up to 9,500 soldiers at a time. It contains a 1,000 seat dining facility (DFAC), 21 shower trailers, each containing 6 showers, for a total of 126 showers, and 110 trash dumpsters. It also contains a base exchange (PX). Soldiers also have access to recreational centers, phones, a barbershop, department store, as well as Burger King and Subway.

== History ==
From the end of Operation Desert Storm (and the subsequent redeployment of troops) in 1991, and through the September 11 attacks, Camp New York was simply called "New York Kabal," the Arabic word for fortress. Since 2002, troops in Kuwait lived in five kabals including New York, New Jersey, Connecticut, Pennsylvania and Virginia. Shortly after the attacks, the Second Brigade combat team of the First Cavalry Division along with the Third Battalion, Eighth Cavalry Regiment (which had recently returned from Operation Desert Spring), deployed to the newly named Camp New York and subsequently built Camp Virginia and Camp Pennsylvania, fitting names as this deployment was in support of Operation Enduring Freedom.

As a temporary staging post, Camp New York does have a few personnel facilities, but most operations are typically maintained at Buehring.
