= Charles H. Buehring =

United States Army officer (1963–2003)

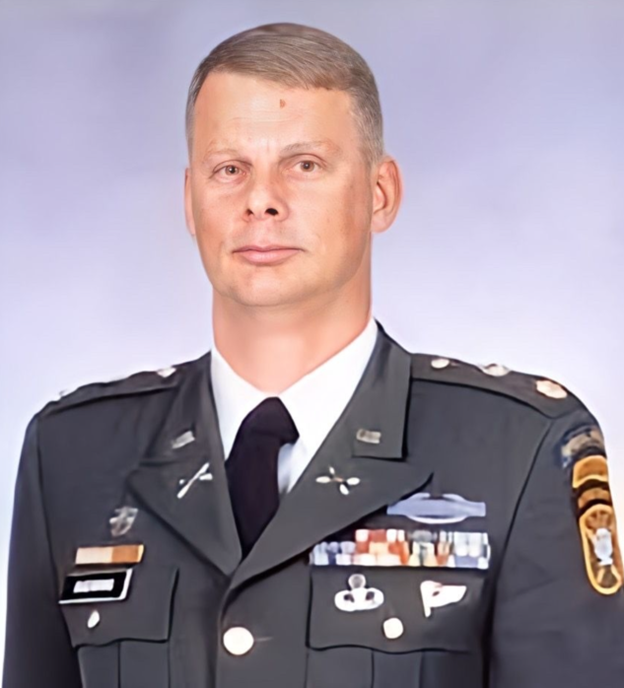
- Born: October 6, 1963; Winter Springs, Florida, U.S.
- Died: October 26, 2003 (aged 40) Rasheed Hotel, Baghdad, Iraq
- Cause of death: Rocket-propelled grenade attack
- Buried: Arlington National Cemetery
- Allegiance: United States
- Branch: United States Army
- Service years: 1985–2003
- Rank: Lieutenant Colonel
- Conflicts: Operation Noble Eagle; Operation Desert Fox; Operation Iraqi Freedom
- Awards: Army Achievement Medal; Army Commendation Medal
- Education: The Citadel; Troy University; Air Command and Staff College
- Spouse: Alicia Buehring
- Children: 2

Charles H. "Chad" Buehring (October 6, 1963 – October 26, 2003) was a United States Army Lieutenant Colonel who was killed in Baghdad on October 26, 2003. He was among the highest-ranking U.S. casualties of the Iraq War. Camp Udairi was renamed Camp Buehring in his honor in 2004.

== Early life and education ==
Born on October 6, 1963, Buehring was raised in Winter Springs, Florida.

Buehring attended The Citadel, graduating in 1985 with a bachelor's degree in political science. He later earned master's degrees in international relations from Troy University and in military arts and strategic studies from Air Command and Staff College.

== Military service ==
After graduation from The Citadel, Buehring was commissioned a second lieutenant, infantry. His first assignment was with the 2-22nd Infantry Regiment, 10th Mountain Division as platoon leader at Fort Benning, and later as company executive officer at Fort Drum.

In 1989, he graduated from Special Forces Assessment and Selection and graduated from the Special Forces Qualification Course in 1990. He was stationed at Fort Bragg for several years, where he served as an operational-detachment-alpha commander in 3rd Battalion, 3rd Special Forces Group, and later the 4th Psychological Operations Group, leading multiple missions to Botswana. He was Ranger qualified and held the triple canopy of Ranger, Special Forces and Airborne.

In 1992, Buehring was one of the first U.S. military personnel deployed in support of United Nations operations in Somalia.In 1994, Buehring graduated the Functional Area 39 course at Fort Bragg with a follow-on assignment as team leader of the 96th Civil Affairs Battalion. While assigned to the battalion, he supported the 1st Armored Division's entry into the former Yugoslavia during Operation Noble Eagle.

From 1998 to 2001, Buehring served as detachment commander with Company A, 8th PSYOP Battalion, supporting Operation Desert Fox delivering more than two million leaflets into Iraq. Buehring also personally executed the delivery of print assets to South Korea and Guam. He was credited by Special Operations Command as being largely responsible for laying the foundation of what is now the Media Operations Center. Buehring was later assigned to Army Central Command Headquarters at Fort McPherson.

He deployed to Iraq in 2002 as part of Operation Iraqi Freedom. In Iraq, he served as the chief of the Military Information Support Team with the Coalition Provisional Authority. His role also involved helping Iraqi radio and television stations emerge in the region. He was considered a top advisor to civilian administrator Paul Bremer on how the occupation was being received by Iraqis and how to encourage their cooperation. In 2003, Buehring served as senior Psychological Operations planner for U.S. Army Central Command.

== Personal life ==
Buehring was married to his wife Alicia and had two sons, and was a longtime resident of Fayetteville, North Carolina. He was a scout master with the Boy Scouts of America.

== Death ==
On October 26, 2003, Buehring was killed during a rocket-propelled grenade attack on the Rasheed Hotel in Baghdad, aged 40. The attack had targeted Deputy Defense Secretary Paul Wolfowitz, who was staying at the hotel. Buehring pushed a group of fellow soldiers to safety before returning to his hotel window to engage the enemy, where he was mortally wounded.

Buehring is interred at Arlington National Cemetery.

== Awards and honors ==
After his death, Buehring's name was honored and added to the Congressional Record. In 2004, Camp Udairi in Kuwait was renamed Camp Buehring in his honor.

In 2009, Buehring's name was included in a commendation and Joint Resolution passed by the North Carolina General Assembly.

In 2014, he was posthumously inducted with regimental honors as a Distinguished Member of the John F. Kennedy Special Warfare Center and School, Psychological Operations Department.

Buehring is an honoree on the Military Hall of Honor. In 2023, The Citadel erected a historical marker and plaque honoring Buehring.
