= Kapali =

Kapali may refer to any of the following:

- Bhairava or Kapali, a form of Shiva
  - Kapali or Kapalika, a Hindu sect of ascetics
- Baishya Kapali, a caste of West Bengal, India
  - Kapali, the ninth of the eleven Rudras (forms of Shiva)
- Kapali Long, an American country singer
- Kapali (Newar caste), a Newar caste in Nepal
- Kapariya also Kapali, a caste of northern India
- Shiva, a major Hindu deity, also known as Kapali

== See also ==
- Kabali (disambiguation)
- Kali, the Hindu goddess, also known as Kapalika
- Kapalika (film), a 1973 Indian Malayalam-language film
