= Kabali (disambiguation) =

Kabali is a 2016 Indian Tamil-language action film directed by Pa. Ranjith, starring Rajinikanth.

Kabali may also refer to:

- Kabalı, Vezirköprü, village in Samsun Province, Turkey
- Kabalı, Yenice, village in Turkey

== See also ==
- Kapali (disambiguation)
- Kabal (disambiguation)
