= Cabalist =

Cabalist may refer to:

- Cabal, a group of people who are united in some close design, usually to promote their private views or interests in an ideology, a state, or another community, often by intrigue and usually without the knowledge of those who are outside their group
- Christian Kabbalah, a Christian interpretation of Jewish Kabbalah
- Hermetic Qabalah, a Western esoteric tradition involving mysticism and the occult
  - English Qabalah, various systems of English numerology related to Hermetic Qabalah that interpret the letters of the Latin script or English alphabet via an assigned set of numerical values
  - English Qaballa, a system of Hermetic Qabalah, based on a system of numerology that interprets the letters of the English alphabet via an assigned set of values
- Kabbalah, an esoteric method, discipline, and school of thought in Jewish mysticism. A traditional Kabbalist is called a Mekubbal (מְקֻובָּל)
  - Lurianic Kabbalah, a school of Kabbalah named after Isaac Luria
  - Meditative Kabbalah, a meditative tradition within Jewish Kabbalah
  - Practical Kabbalah, a branch of the Jewish mystical tradition that concerns the use of magic
  - Prophetic Kabbalah, or Ecstatic Kabbalah, Abraham Abulafia's school of Meditative Kabbalah

== See also ==
- Cabal (disambiguation)
- Cabala (disambiguation)
- Caballistics, Inc. a 2000 AD story
