= Kabalar =

Kabalar may refer to the following villages in Turkey:

- Kabalar, Alaplı
- Kabalar, Beypazarı
- Kabalar, Çal
- Kabalar, Çine
- Kabalar, İnebolu

== See also ==
- Kabala (disambiguation)
