= Kabbalah: Mythic Judaism =

RPG supplement published in 1997

- Cover art by Dom Reardon
- Designers: David Honigsberg; Adam Bank; Jeremiah Genest
- Illustrators: Jaume Fabregat i Vilella; Ralph Horsely; Eric Hotz; Jeff Menges; Eric Pommer; Tonia Walden
- Publishers: Atlas Games
- Publication: 1997
- Genres: Fantasy

Kabbalah: Mythic Judaism is a supplement published by Atlas Games in 1997 for the fantasy role-playing game Ars Magica that outlines how to incorporate kabbalah into the game.

== Contents ==
Kabbalah: Mythic Judaism is a supplement in which the Jewish Quarters of Mythic Europe are detailed. The book is divided into two parts:

- Background information, which covers law, history, faith, legends, the mysteries of Kabbalah, the Tree of Life, gematria, and the animation of golems;
- New rules covering character creation, a bestiary, etc.

== Publication history ==
Atlas Games published the fantasy role-playing game Ars Magica in 1987, and many supplements followed, including Kabbalah: Mythic Judaism, released in 1997. The 160-page softcover book was designed by David Honigsberg, Adam Bank, Jeremiah Genest, and featured cover art by Dom Reardon, and interior art by Jaume Fabregat i Vilella, Ralph Horsley, Eric Hotz, Jeff Menges, Eric Pommer, and Tonia Walden,

== Reception ==
Kabbalah: Mythic Judaism was reviewed in the online second version of Pyramid which said "anyone who thought that the Order of Hermes were a strange bunch really needs to look at this, the latest supplement, which deals with some of the Order's most formidable neighbors; the rabbinical Kabbalists of the European Jewish community."

In Issue 12 of the French games magazine Backstab, David Benoit called this "a marvel ... a substantial booklet describing Jewish culture in good old Mythical Europe and its implications for Magica." Benoit noted "the magic is very faithful to the foundational texts of the religion and offers a wide variety of possibilities that bear no resemblance to Hermetic magic. The only downside is that it will be difficult to portray a Kabbalist rabbi well-integrated into society." Benoit concluded, "it's a supplement to recommend to everyone, even those who don't play Ars Magica, or any medieval fantasy game. In fact, it's an incredible collection of information about Judaism that's good to take and use in various places."
