= Camp Wolf =

Iraq War staging post for U.S. troops in Kuwait

Coordinates: 29.21972°N 47.98527°E

Camp Wolf KCIA was an Iraq War staging post for U.S. troops in the central region of Kuwait on the grounds of Kuwait International Airport. From 2003 to 2004, the camp was used for military troops and air cargo heading north into Iraq for Operation Iraqi Freedom. More than 200,000 U.S. soldiers, sailors, airmen, marines, and coast guardsmen came through the aerial port of debarkation (APOD) between 1 January 2003 and the end of major combat operations.
