= 168th Aviation Regiment =

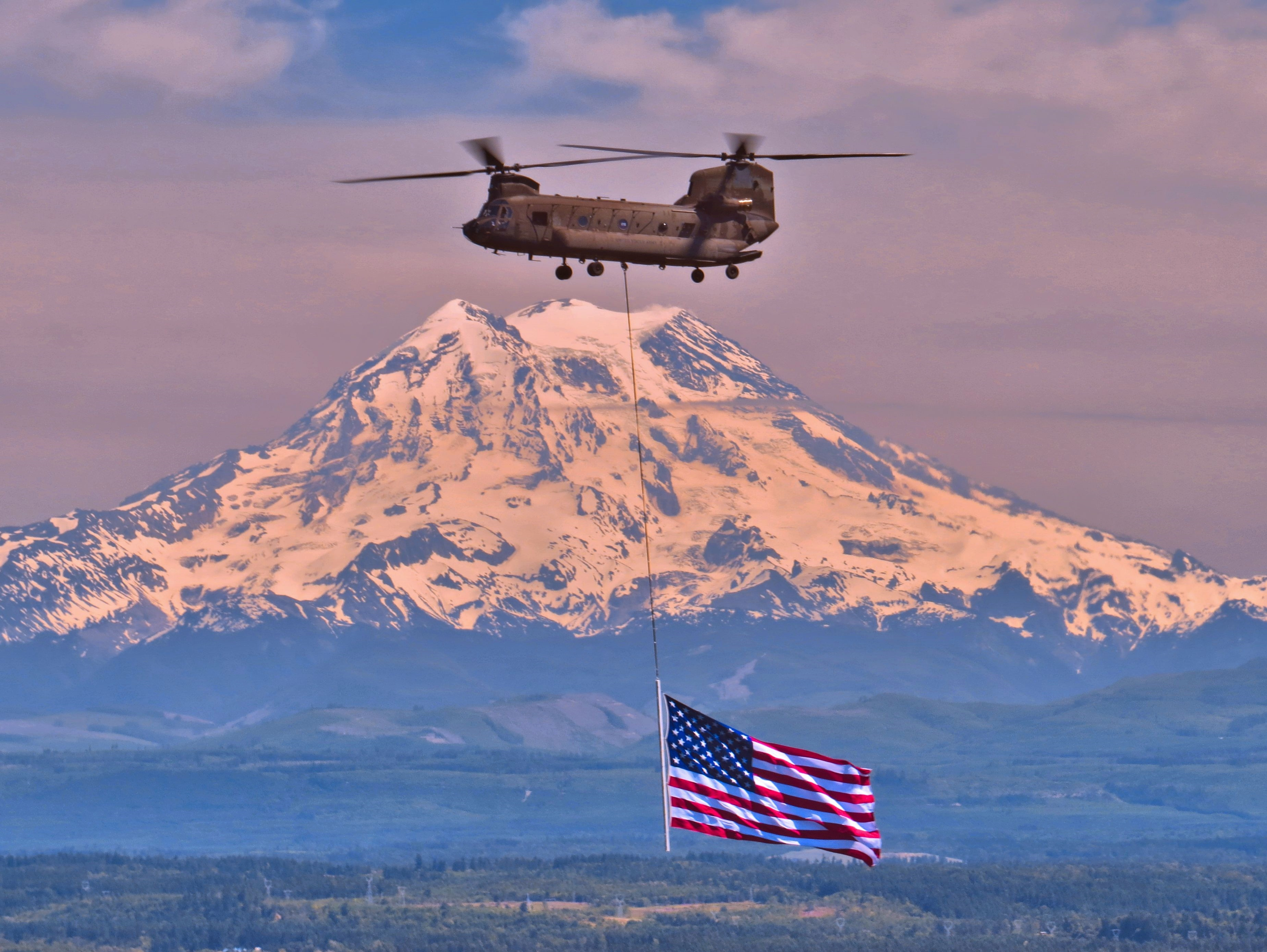
- A CH-47 Chinook from 1-168th GSAB performing a "flag drag"
- Active: 1987/88-present
- Country: United States
- Branch: United States Army Aviation Branch
- Type: Aviation
- Part of: Washington Army National Guard; 96th Aviation Troop Command
- Garrison/HQ: Gray Army Airfield, JBLM, WA
- Motto: Ready When Needed

Commanders
- Current commander: LTC Emily Gerding
- Current Command Sergeant Major: CSM Michael Luna

Insignia
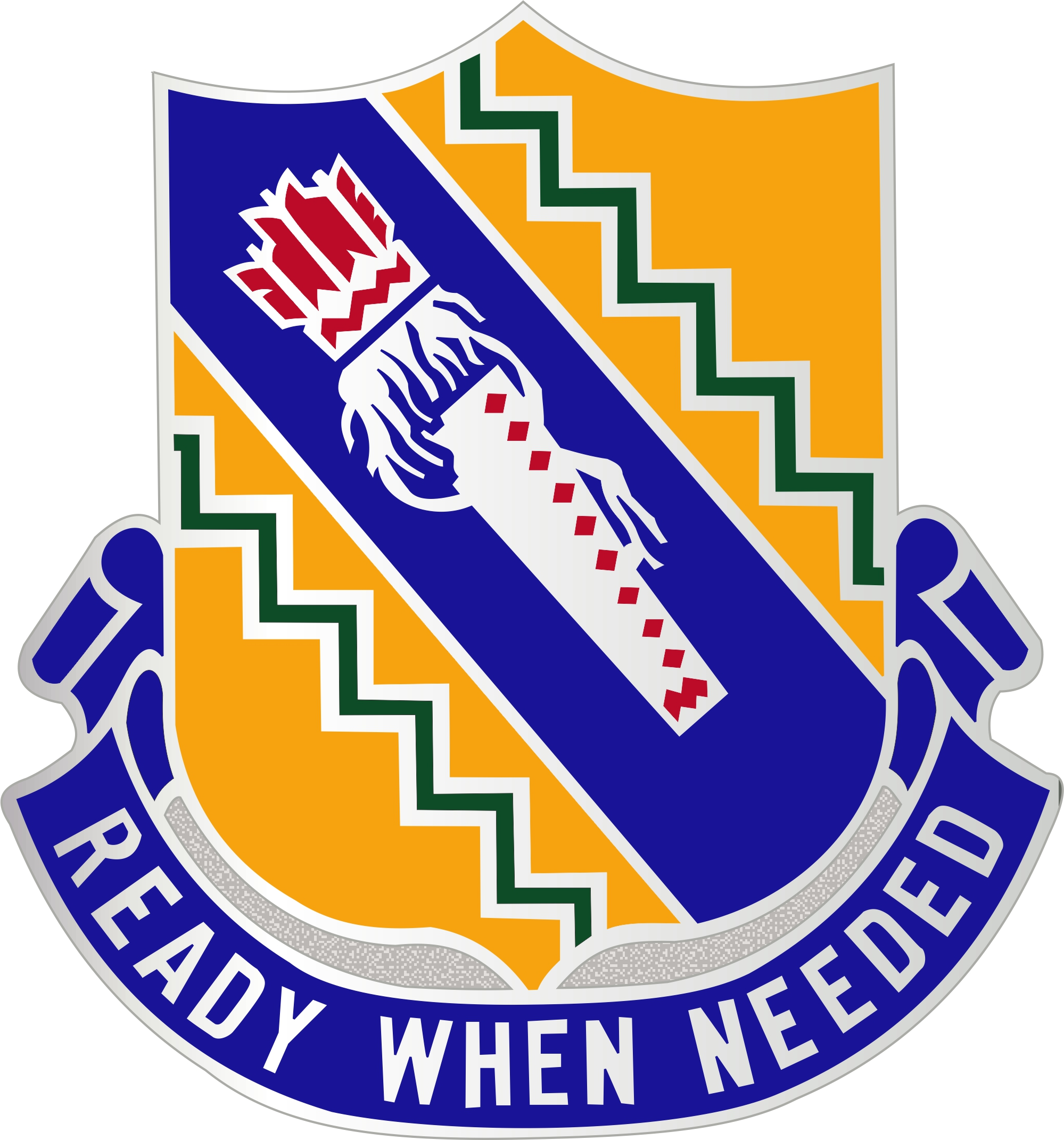
- Distinctive unit insignia

Aircraft flown
- Utility helicopter: UH-60L Black Hawk
- Transport: CH-47 Chinook

The 168th Aviation Regiment is an aviation regiment of the United States Army.

== History ==
The 1st Battalion (General Support), 168th Aviation Regiment (GSAB), can trace its history back to 1959 when it was originally organized as the 41st Aviation Company in the Washington Army National Guard located at Camp Murray, Tacoma, Washington. Over the next fifty years the battalion would be reorganized several different times to meet the changing needs of the U.S. Army.

In 1988 the 1-168th AVN was designated as an attack battalion consisting of AH-1 Cobras and OH-58 Kiowa helicopters. With the retirement of the AH-1 Cobra from the Army inventory, the 1-168th AVN was designated a Theater Army Fixed Wing Battalion and equipped with CH-47 Chinook and UH-60 Black-Hawk helicopters. These two airframes would form what would become the 1-168th Assault Battalion.

In 2006 the battalion transformed to meet the needs of the U.S. Army by creating the 1-168th General Support Aviation Battalion. The battalion consists of units located in six Western states. Prior to its transformation, subordinate units supported multiple deployments in support of Operation Enduring Freedom, Iraqi Freedom, New Dawn, Spartan Shield, and Inherent Resolve. The battalion has also supported NATO operations with International Allies in Kosovo during Operation Joint Guardian. During the transformation to its current configuration, the battalion was alerted for deployment in support of Operation Iraqi Freedom 07-09. The 168th has been designated CENTCOM Aviation Task Force with its headquarters located at Udari Army Airfield, Camp Beuhring, Kuwait several times.

Composed of units from Washington, Alaska, Iowa, Montana, Colorado, New Mexico, and Minnesota, the Raptors deployed in 2011, in support of Operation New Dawn 11-12. In 2015 elements of the battalion deployed to CENTCOM areas of operation in support of Operation Spartan Shield. The 1-168th returned to CENTCOM in support of Operation Spartan Shield and Inherent Resolve in 2021-22

== Structure ==
- 1st Battalion (General Support):
  - Headquarters and Headquarters Company
    - Detachment 1 (ID ARNG)
    - Detachment 2 (OR ARNG)
  - Company A (AK ARNG)
  - Company B (WA ARNG)
    - Detachment 1 (OR ARNG)
  - Company C (UH-60) (WI ARNG)
    - Detachment 1 (MedEvac) (CO ARNG)
    - Detachment 2 (WA ARNG)
  - Company D
    - Detachment 1
    - Detachment 2 (OR ARNG)
    - Detachment 4 (CO ARNG)
  - Company E
    - Detachment 1 (WA ARNG)
    - Detachment 2 (OR ARNG)
    - Detachment 4 (CO ARNG)
  - Detachment 1, Company B, 351st Aviation Support Battalion
  - Company F (Air Traffic Services) (AZ ARNG)
  - Company G (Medevac) (NM ARNG)
    - Detachment 1 (ID ARNG)
