= Cabal (surname) =

Cabal is a Spanish and French surname. Notable people with the surname include:

- Juan Sebastián Cabal (born 1986), Colombian tennis player
- Mariano Cabal (1830–1885), governor of the province of Santa Fe, Argentina between 9 April 1886 and 7 April 1871
- Raymond Cabal (1888–?), French wrestler
