= Kabala =

Kabala may refer to:

- Kabbalah, an esoteric school of thought in Jewish mysticism
- Kabala, Artuklu, a village in Mardin Province, Turkey
- Kabala, Järva County, a village in Türi Parish, Järva County, Estonia
- Kabala, Rapla County, a village in Rapla Parish, Rapla County, Estonia
- Viru-Kabala, a village in Vinni Parish, Lääne-Viru County, Estonia
- Kabala, Sierra Leone, a town in Sierra Leone
- Ka-Bala, a 1967 board game
- Prince Kabala, a character in the manga series Speed Racer

== See also ==
- Cabala (disambiguation)
- Kabalar (disambiguation)
- Kabbala (disambiguation)
- Karbala (disambiguation)
- Kavala (disambiguation)
