= David Hönigsberg =

South African musician

David Hönigsberg (28 October 1959 – 3 February 2005) was a South African classical composer, conductor and musicologist.

Born in Johannesburg, South Africa, he lived in Switzerland since 1993 until his death.

At the age of 45, he died in Aarau.

Hönigsberg was a representative for the South African Composer's Guild at the 1992 ISCM World Music Days.
