= Battle of Karbala (disambiguation) =

The Battle of Karbala was fought in 680 CE between the army of Umayyad caliph Yazid I on one side, and the army of Husayn ibn Ali (grandson of the Islamic prophet Muhammad) on the other.

Battle of Karbala may also refer to:

- Battle of Karbala (1991), during the 1991 uprisings in Iraq
- Battle of Karbala (2003), during the 2003 invasion of Iraq
- Defense of Karbala City Hall, during the Iraq spring fighting of 2004
- Battle of Karbala (2007), during the Iraq War
