= Kavala Island =

Island in Lake Tanganyika, Africa

Coordinates: 05°39′00″S 29°25′00″E

Kavala Island (Île Kavala) is an island in Lake Tanganyika in central Africa. It had a lighthouse by the late 19th century. The London Missionary Society set up a mission there in 1882, relocating from Ujiji, becoming its Central African Mission. The island is about 6 km (3.7 mi) long and about 1 km (0.62 mi) from the western shore of Lake Tanganyika. It is a possession of the Democratic Republic of the Congo (DRC).
