= Camp Buehring =

United States military base in Kuwait

Camp Buehring Udairi Landing Zone
- Kuwait
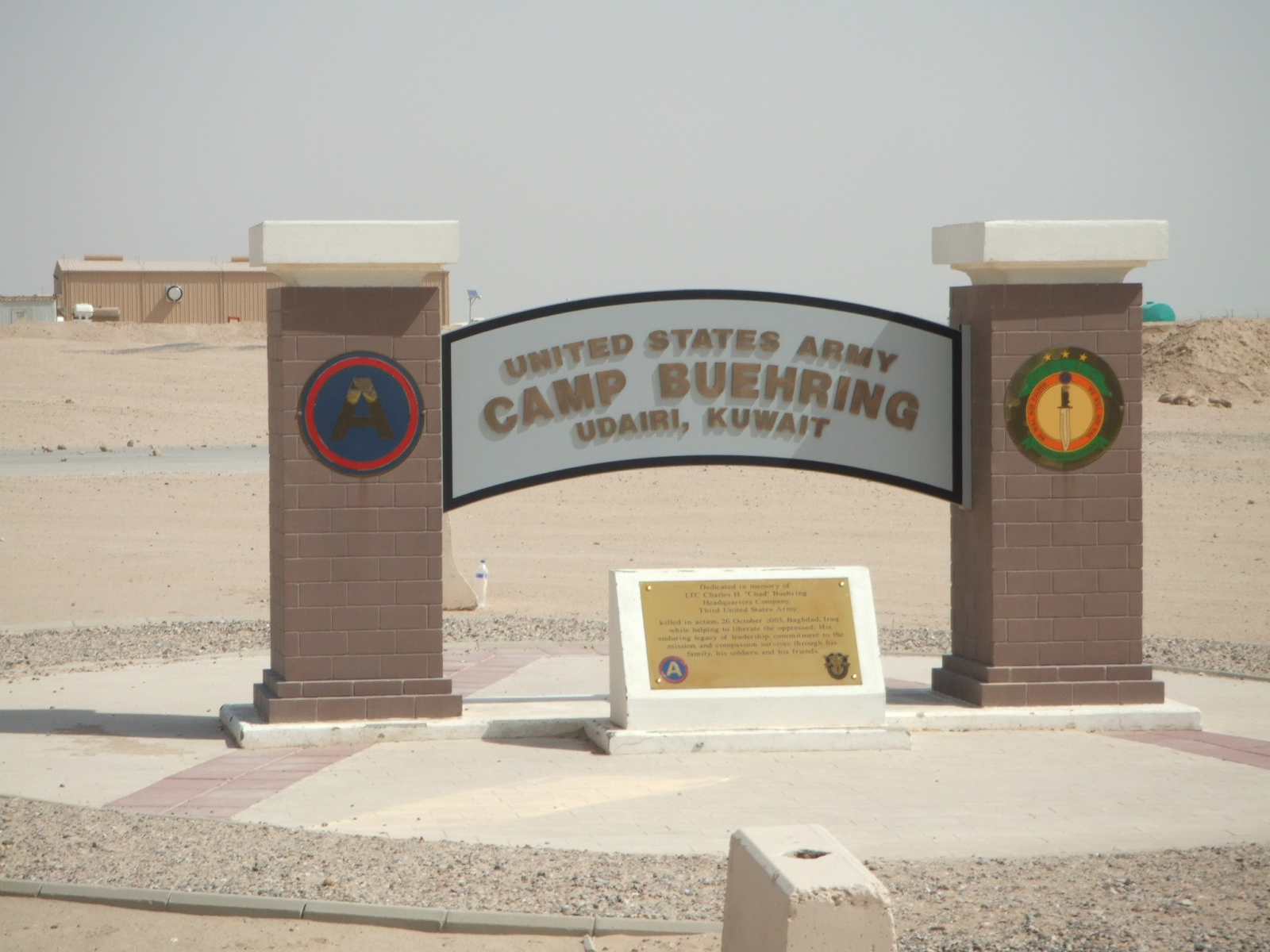
- A sign at Camp Buehring's main entrance, May 2006

Site information
- Type: Staging post
- Owner: U.S. Department of Defense
- Operator: United States Army (airfield)

Location
- Shown within Kuwait
- Coordinates: 29°41′52″N 47°25′35″E

Site history
- Built: 2002
- In use: January 2003 – present

Airfield information
- Identifiers: ICAO: OKDI
- Elevation: 424 feet (129 m) AMSL
Runways
Direction	Length and surface
18/36	4,266 feet (1,300 m) Asphalt
- Sources: DoD FLIP

Camp Buehring (formerly Camp Udairi) is a staging post for US troops in the northwestern region of Kuwait. From its founding in January 2003 to the present date, the base has been used for military troops heading north into Iraq and is the primary location for the Middle Eastern Theater Reserve.

The area surrounding Camp Buehring, known as the Udairi Range Complex, is largely uninhabited, except for a few nomadic Bedouin tribes raising camels, goats, and sheep. Camp New York is nearby, in the same Udairi Range Complex.

== History ==
Camp Buehring is named after Lieutenant Colonel Charles H. Buehring, who was killed in Baghdad on October 26, 2003. Buehring was among the highest-ranking U.S. casualties of the Iraq War. Camp Udairi was renamed in his honor in 2004.

Much of Camp Buehring has operated continuously since its establishment in 2003. Units deploying to Iraq from CONUS would spend 2-3 weeks at Buehring to receive last batch of field equipment, zero their weapons, acclimatize, and then move forward via Route 1 or by flight to their final destination within Iraq.

A vehicle-ramming attack on March 30, 2003, left 16 people wounded, after a disgruntled Egyptian electrician rammed a pick-up truck into a group of US soldiers. The perpetrator was shot twice and seriously wounded.

According to U.S. officials, an Iranian F-5 attacked Camp Buehring during the opening days of the 2026 Iran war.

== Units ==
Aviation Brigades [C193rd Aviation Battalion Hawaii 2004]

- 34th Expeditionary Combat Aviation Brigade 2008.
- Unknown CAB until April 2015
- 185th Aviation Brigade (Theater) from April to December 2015
  - 1st Battalion, 137th Aviation Regiment during October 2015.
- 40th Combat Aviation Brigade from December 2015 to August 2016
- 1st Battalion (General Support), 168th Aviation Regiment 'Hercules' with Boeing CH-47F Chinook's
  - Company B (Chinook)
- 77th Combat Aviation Brigade from August 2016 to April 2017
  - 1st Battalion (General Support), 111th Aviation Regiment, 77th Combat Aviation Brigade during October 2016
  - Company A (UH-60 & AH-64)
- 29th Combat Aviation Brigade from April to December 2017
- 449th Combat Aviation Brigade from December 2017. until August 2018
  - 1st Battalion (Assault), 244th Aviation Regiment (TF Voodoo) until August 2018.
  - 248th Aviation Support Battalion (TF Viper)
- 35th Combat Aviation Brigade between August 2018 and April 2019.
  - 1st Battalion (Assault Helicopter), 108th Aviation Regiment (TF Falon) until April 2019.
  - 935th Aviation Support Battalion
- Combat Aviation Brigade, 38th Infantry Division from April 2019
  - 8th Battalion, 229th Aviation Regiment from April 2019.
- 34th Combat Aviation Brigade from 2019 to September 2020
- 28th Expeditionary Combat Aviation Brigade (TF Anvil) from September 2020 until May 2021
- 40th Combat Aviation Brigade (TF Phoenix) from May 2021 until January 2022
  - 1-168th General Support Aviation Battalion (TF Raptor)
  - 640th Aviation Support Battalion
  - 1-82nd Attack Reconnaissance Battalion (TF Wolfpack) (- October 2021)
  - 1-227th Attack Reconnaissance Battalion (TF Attack) (October 2021 - )
  - Task Force Toro from the Spanish Armed Forces
  - Task Force Griffon from the Italian Army
- 11th Combat Aviation Brigade (TF Eagle) from January 2022 until August 2022.
- 36th Combat Aviation Brigade (TF Mustang) between August 2022 and Present.
  - 449th Aviation Support Battalion (ASB)
  - 2-149th General Support Aviation Battalion (GSAB) (TF Rough Riders)
  - 3-142nd Assault Helicopter Battalion (AHB), New York Army National Guard
  - 1-101st Attack Aviation Battalion (Task Force No Mercy) of the 101st Airborne Division
  - Task Force Toro from the Spanish Armed Forces
  - Task Force Griffon from 5th Army Aviation Regiment "Rigel", Italian Army

Aviation Battalions

- 2515th Naval Air Ambulance Detachment from HSC-21 and HSC-23 during 2007.
- 1st Battalion (Attack Reconnaissance), 1st Aviation Regiment
- 2nd Battalion (General Support), 1st Aviation Regiment

Ground forces

- 4th BCT February–March 2004
- 4th Infantry Division passed through NOV 2004-JAN 2005 en route to Baghdad to assume the role of MND-B. The Division Deployment was set up here to push units through.

2022

- 1067th Composite Truck Company December 2022-September 2023
