= Kabal (earthworks) =

Part of a desert

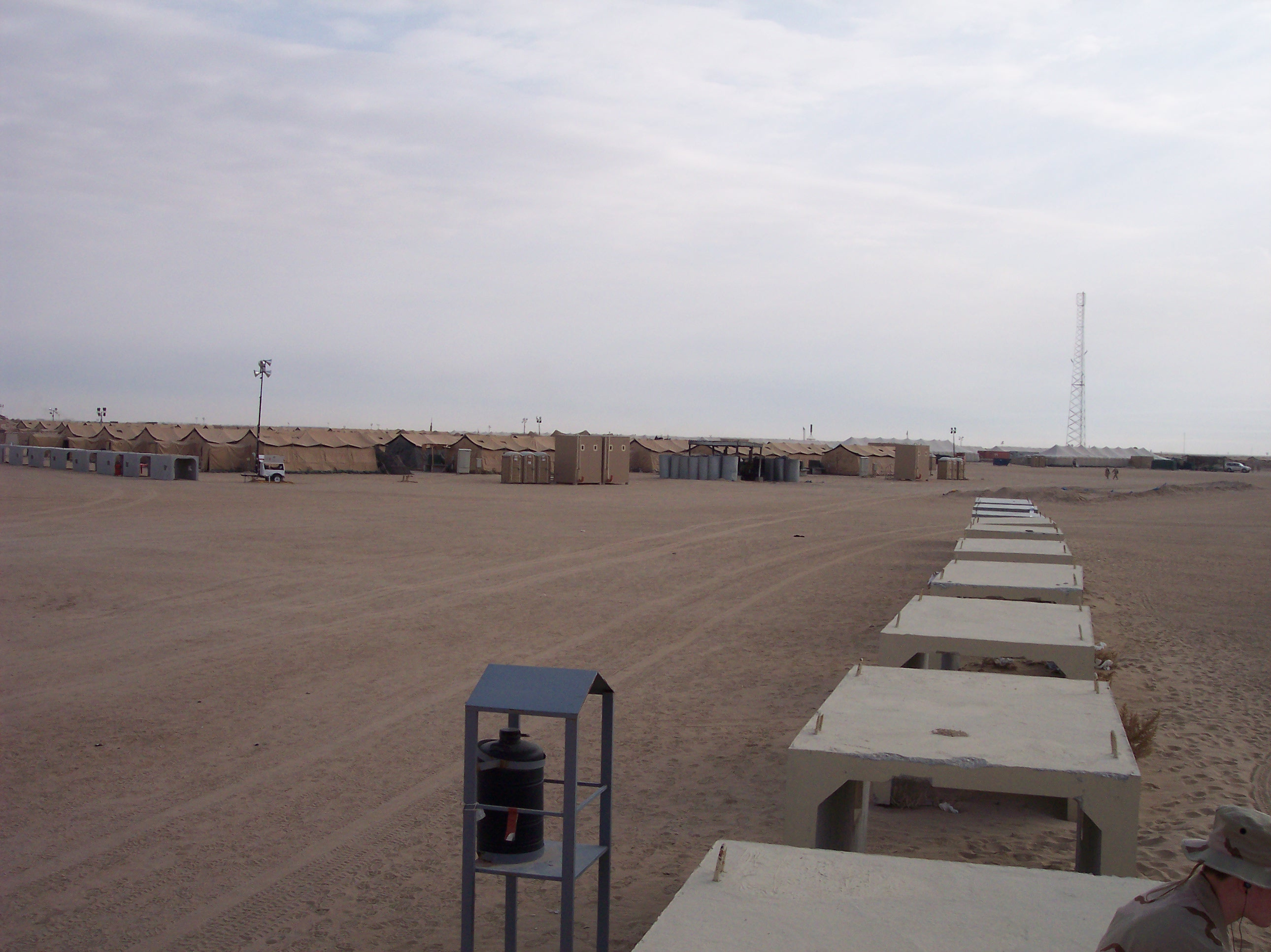
Transient housing at Camp Virginia in 2005

A kabal is a U.S. military construction consisting of a 2.6-square-kilometre (1 sq mi) patch of desert, with 3-metre-tall (10 ft) berms bulldozed to form perimeter earthworks. Kabals are located less than 80 kilometres (50 mi) from the Iraqi border. The Kuwaiti government has cordoned off the northern part of its country, an area of more than 4,100 square kilometres (1,600 sq mi) out of 18,000 square kilometres (6,900 sq mi), where American military and coalition forces are based and are conducting training. Soldiers assigned to these remote sites must maintain 24-hour operations as units are close to the Iraqi border.

== Description ==
Kabals contain dining facilities, air-conditioned sleeping tents, recreation facilities and storage for weapons, tanks and their armored vehicles. The kabals are named New York, New Jersey, Connecticut, Pennsylvania and Virginia. Three others, "Diamond Head", "Camp Concho", and "Hunter" are apparently inactive. The kabals are tent cities with each camp containing large areas of tents each housing six soldiers, mess halls, rows of portable toilets, and trailers with sinks and showers and a gym. Tents are equipped with telephones. For recreation there are a variety of movies, games, and a computer room.

The walls usually form a circle that has one or two entrances guarded by soldiers with other soldiers on guard duty around the perimeter or in guard towers. Establishing kabals is manpower- and supply-intensive, requiring many convoys of Class IV (construction and barrier materiel) and contracted items. Combat Regeneration and Reorganization [CR2] is the redeployment of equipment, vehicles and soldiers from the Kabal.

== History ==
Kabals were established shortly after Operation Desert Storm as part of a U.S. mission to protect Kuwait with a battle-ready battalion and to train service members for possible future wars against Iraq.

== See also ==
- Fort
