= 110th Maneuver Enhancement Brigade =

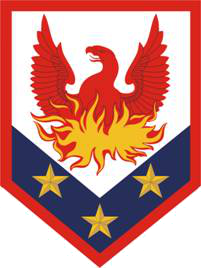
- shoulder sleeve insignia
- Active: 2007 - present
- Country: United States
- Allegiance: Missouri National Guard
- Branch: United States Army National Guard
- Type: Maneuver Enhancement Brigade
- Size: Brigade
- Part of: 35th Infantry Division (United States)
- Garrison/HQ: Kansas City Armory, Kansas City, Missouri
- Motto: Get It Done
- Engagements: World War I; Meuse-Argonne Offensive; World War II; Aleutian Islands Campaign; Battle of Leyte; Battle of Okinawa; Operation Blacklist Forty; War on terror; Operation Iraqi Freedom; Operation Spartan Shield; Operation Inherent Resolve

Commanders
- Current commander: COL Christopher Powers

Insignia
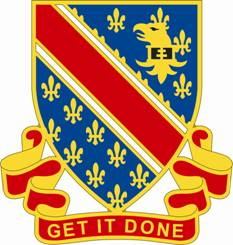
- 110th Maneuver Enhancement Brigade DUI

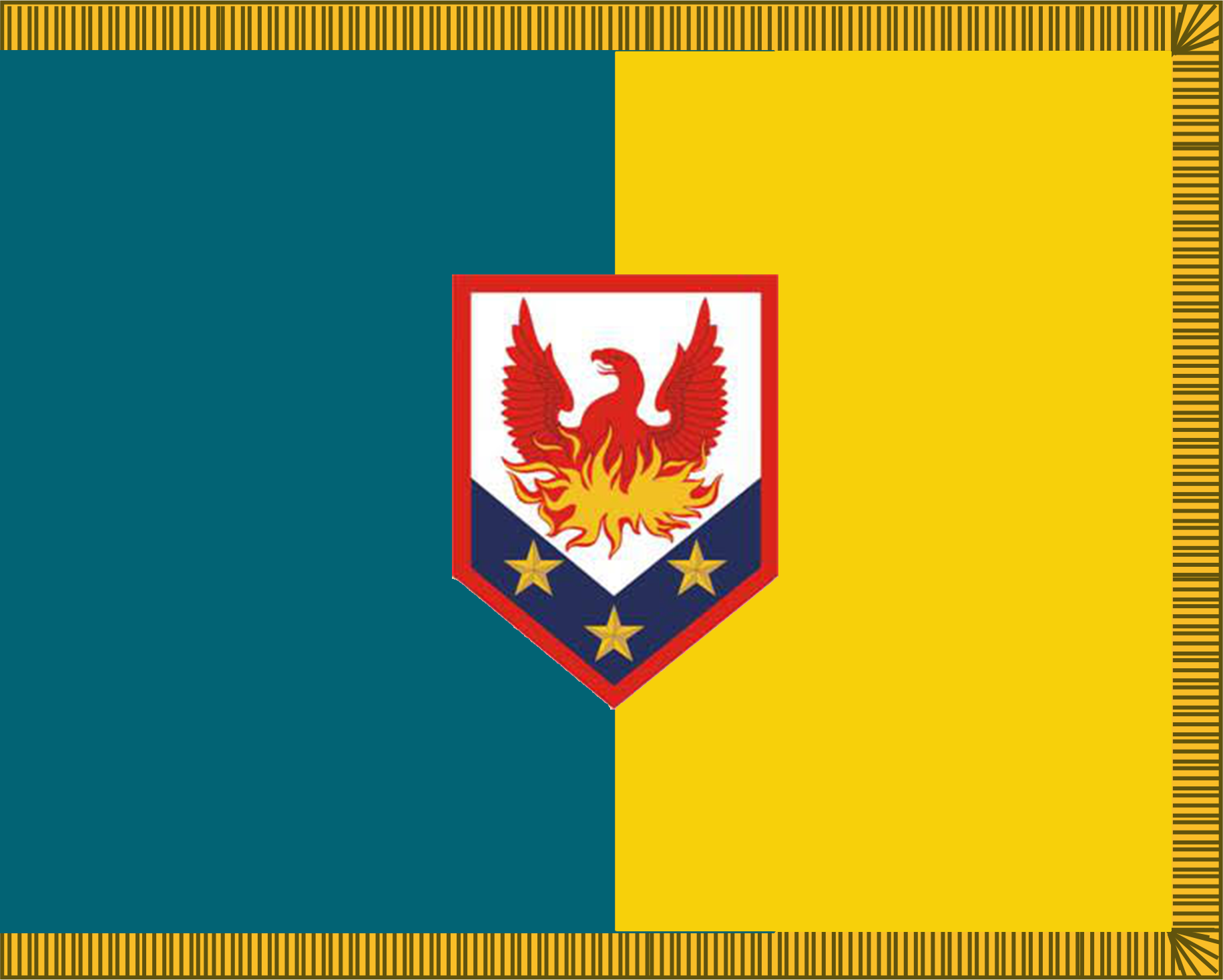
- 110th Maneuver Enhancement Brigade Flag

The 110th Maneuver Enhancement Brigade (110th MEB) is a maneuver enhancement brigade of the Missouri Army National Guard. The brigade has been assigned to the 35th Infantry Division since mid-2023, and will be reorganized as the division's "protection brigade" by 2026 as the U.S. Army modifies its divisional structures.

== History ==
The 110th Maneuver Enhancement Brigade unofficially descends from the 3rd Infantry Regiment, Missouri National Guard, first organized with that designation in 1886, but officially is a descendant of the 110th Engineer Regiment, which was first organized in 1917 during World War I as a part of the 35th Division. The 1st Battalion of Engineers, Kansas National Guard, the 1st Battalion of Engineers, Missouri National Guard, and the Band, 1st Kansas Infantry Regiment, were consolidated to form the 110th Engineer Regiment. The 110th Engineer Regiment fought in the Meuse-Argonne offensive in the closing months of World War I, arrived at the port of New York on 19 April 1919 aboard the USS Von Steuben, and was demobilized on 3 May 1919 at Fort Riley, Kansas.

=== 110th Engineer Regiment ===
The 110th Engineer Regiment was constituted in the National Guard in 1921, assigned to the 35th Division, and allotted to Missouri. It was organized on 1 October 1921 at Kansas City, Missouri, by redesignation of the 3rd Engineers, Missouri National Guard, which was originally organized and federally recognized on 14 May 1918 as the 7th Infantry (state troops), redesignated as the 3rd Infantry on 6 August 1920, and reorganized as the 3rd Engineers on 1 May 1921. The entire regiment (Headquarters, Headquarters and Service Company with Band, Medical Detachment, and 1st and 2nd Battalions each with three companies) was organized with men from Kansas City. The regiment was consolidated on 2 July 1923 with its World War I predecessor. The regiment conducted weekly drills at its armory at 3620 Main Street in Kansas City, which was designed by the regimental commander, Colonel Edward M. Stayton, to fit the needs of an engineer regiment. The building was privately owned, but leased to the state of Missouri. It was listed on the National Register of Historic Places on 24 February 2020 as a key example of an interwar National Guard armory, and is currently on track to be redeveloped. The regiment also maintained a 55-acre park called the "Military Country Club" in the Knobtown neighborhood southeast of Kansas City proper near Raytown for the use of the officers and men, with a ten-target rifle range, a twelve-acre lake, and a stable of saddle horses. Annual training was done at Camp Clark, near Nevada, Missouri, from 1921-39, and for at least three years (1938-40), the regiment trained 39 company-grade engineer officers of the 102nd Division at Camp Clark and Camp Ripley, Minnesota. The regiment was inducted into federal service on 23 December 1940 at Kansas City, Missouri, and was transferred on 29 December to Camp Joseph T. Robinson, Arkansas. The headquarters was transferred on 23 October 1941 to Fort Ord, California.

=== Commanders ===
- Colonel Sherwood A. Cheney (26 September 1917-10 July 1918)
- Colonel Thomas C. Clarke (4 August 1918-6 February 1919)
- Colonel Edward M. Stayton (6 February-3 May 1919, 19 May 1921-18 November 1932)
- Colonel Jesse F. Brown (18 November 1932-6 March 1942)

=== 110th Engineer Battalion ===
On 1 March 1942, the 35th Infantry Division was reorganized from a "square" into a "triangular" division and the 110th Engineer Regiment was split into two battalions. The Headquarters, Headquarters and Service Company, and Companies A, B, and C became the 110th Engineer Battalion, which remained assigned to the 35th Infantry Division, while the 1st Battalion headquarters was disbanded and the 2nd Battalion became the 2nd Battalion, 132nd Engineer Regiment, which maintained a separate lineage. The 110th Engineer Battalion was relieved from assignment to the 35th Infantry Division on 27 January 1943 and subsequently fought in the Aleutian Islands campaign in 1943, the Philippines campaign in 1944-1945, and the Battle of Okinawa in 1945, being inactivated on 31 January 1946 in Korea. The battalion was allotted to the Missouri National Guard after World War II as the 110th Engineer Combat Battalion and assigned to the 35th Infantry Division. As of 2001, it was active with headquarters at Kansas City as a component of the 35th Infantry Division (Mechanized).

== Heraldry ==
- Coat of arms: Approved 15 November 1923; amended 15 January 1924
- Shield: Azure seme-de-lis or, a bend gules fimbriated argent in sinister chief an eagle’s head erased of the second gorged with a collar sable charged with a Lorraine cross also of the second
- Crest: That for regiments of the Missouri National Guard
- Motto: Get It Done
- Description: The 110th Engineers served during the World War in the Amiens section with the British. The coat of arms of Amiens displays a blue field sown with gold fleurs-de-lis. This also has another significance, for the blue field represents the old 3rd Missouri Infantry and the fleurs-de-lis recall the Louisiana Purchase, and thus the home state. The diagonal stripe is for service in Alsace. The arms of Alsace show a red field with the diagonal stripe. The stripe is red and edged with white to indicate the Engineers. The eagle’s head is for the very hard fighting in the Meuse-Argonne. It is the device of St. Mihiel, the nearest arms-bearing town
- Distinctive insignia: Approved 3 August 1925
  - Shield and motto of the coat of arms

== Organization ==
- 110th Maneuver Enhancement Brigade, in Kansas City
  - Headquarters Support Company, 110th Maneuver Enhancement Brigade, at Kansas City
  - 135th Signal Company, in Kansas City
  - 1st Battalion, 138th Infantry Regiment, at Jefferson Barracks (part of 39th Infantry Brigade Combat Team)
    - Headquarters and Headquarters Company, 1st Battalion, 138th Infantry Regiment, at Jefferson Barracks
      - Detachment 2, Headquarters and Headquarters Battery, 1st Battalion, 206th Field Artillery Regiment, at Jefferson Barracks
    - Company A, 1st Battalion, 138th Infantry Regiment, in Mexico
    - Company B, 1st Battalion, 138th Infantry Regiment, in Bridgeton
    - Company C, 1st Battalion, 138th Infantry Regiment, in Perryville
    - Company D (Weapons), 1st Battalion, 138th Infantry Regiment, in Sikeston
    - Company I (Forward Support), 39th Brigade Support Battalion, in Poplar Bluff
  - 3rd Battalion, 138th Infantry Regiment, in Kansas City (part of 72nd Infantry Brigade Combat Team)
    - Headquarters and Headquarters Company, 3rd Battalion, 138th Infantry Regiment, in Kansas City
    - Company A, 3rd Battalion, 138th Infantry Regiment, in Boonville
    - Company B, 3rd Battalion, 138th Infantry Regiment, in Lamar
    - Company C, 3rd Battalion, 138th Infantry Regiment, in West Plains
    - Company D (Weapons), 3rd Battalion, 138th Infantry Regiment, in Clinton
    - Company I (Forward Support), 536th Brigade Support Battalion, in Jefferson City
  - 1st Battalion, 129th Field Artillery Regiment, in Maryville (M777A2) (part of 130th Field Artillery Brigade)
    - Headquarters and Headquarters Battery, 1st Battalion, 129th Field Artillery Regiment, in Maryville
    - Battery A, 1st Battalion, 119th Field Artillery Regiment, in Albany
    - Battery B, 1st Battalion, 119th Field Artillery Regiment, in Chillicothe
    - Battery C, 1st Battalion, 119th Field Artillery Regiment, in Independence
    - 1128th Forward Support Company, in Marshall
