= Camp Doniphan, Oklahoma =

US military base in Oklahoma

Coordinates: 34.6757°N 98.4162°W

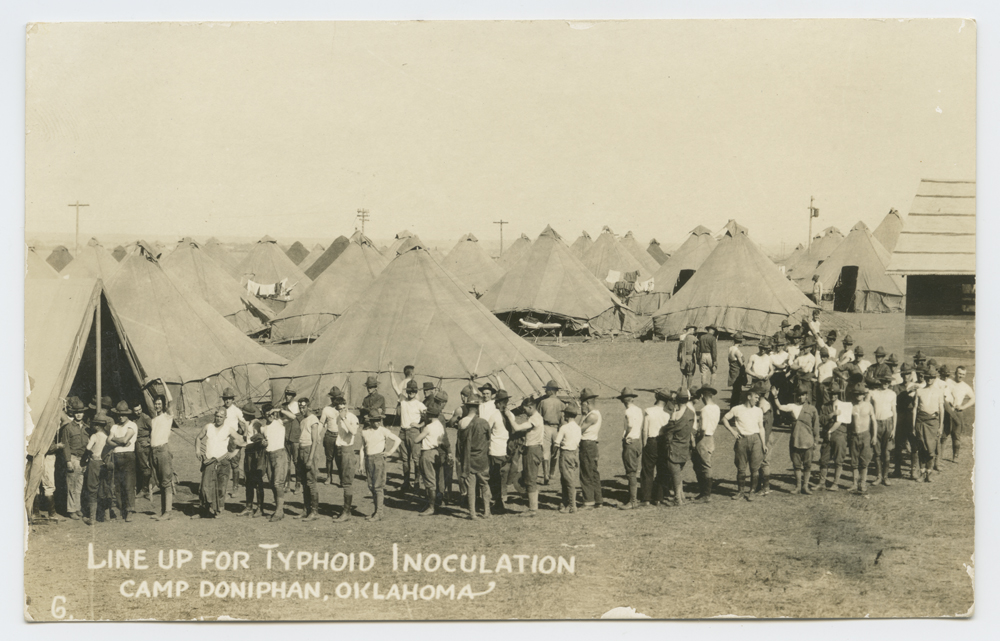
Soldiers line up for Typhoid Inoculation, Camp Doniphan, ca. 1917–1918.

Camp Doniphan was a military base adjacent to Fort Sill, just outside Lawton, in Comanche County, Oklahoma, that was activated for use in World War I for artillery training. The post was closed in 1918 and incorporated into Fort Sill.

== History ==
The camp was named for Alexander William Doniphan, a hero of the Mexican–American War from the Missouri Volunteers of Northwestern Missouri. It was from this camp that thousands of soldiers, from Oklahoma, Kansas and Missouri, were given basic training prior to being sent to Camp Mills, Mineola, Long Island, New York; Philadelphia, Pennsylvania; or Camp Merritt, Dumont, New Jersey, for embarkation to France. The camp contained 1,267 buildings, the majority of which were tents, over a 2,000-acre (8.1 km^{2}) area.

The camp was home of the 35th Infantry Division, made up of the National Guard of Kansas and Missouri. It became part of the United States Army Field Artillery School, and included the 128th Field Artillery Regiment and 129th Field Artillery Regiment of Missouri, 130th Field Artillery Regiment of Kansas, and the 158th Field Artillery Regiment of Oklahoma. Harry S. Truman was stationed at Camp Doniphan from September 1917 until March 1918, and he was assigned to run the regimental canteen. It was here that he made Edward Jacobson his business partner.
