= Camp Doniphan =

Camp Doniphan could be:

- Camp Doniphan, Missouri, a wildlife camp near Excelsior Springs, Missouri
- Camp Doniphan, Oklahoma, a World War I military camp outside of Fort Sill, Oklahoma
- Camp Doniphan, Texas, a military camp in El Paso, Texas
