= 130th Field Artillery Brigade =

- 130th Field Artillery Brigade Shoulder Sleeve Insignia
- Active: 1917 – present
- Country: United States
- Branch: United States Army National Guard
- Type: Field artillery
- Size: Brigade
- Part of: Kansas Army National Guard
- Garrison/HQ: Manhattan, Kansas
- Engagements: World War I; World War II; Korean War; Operation Iraqi Freedom

Insignia
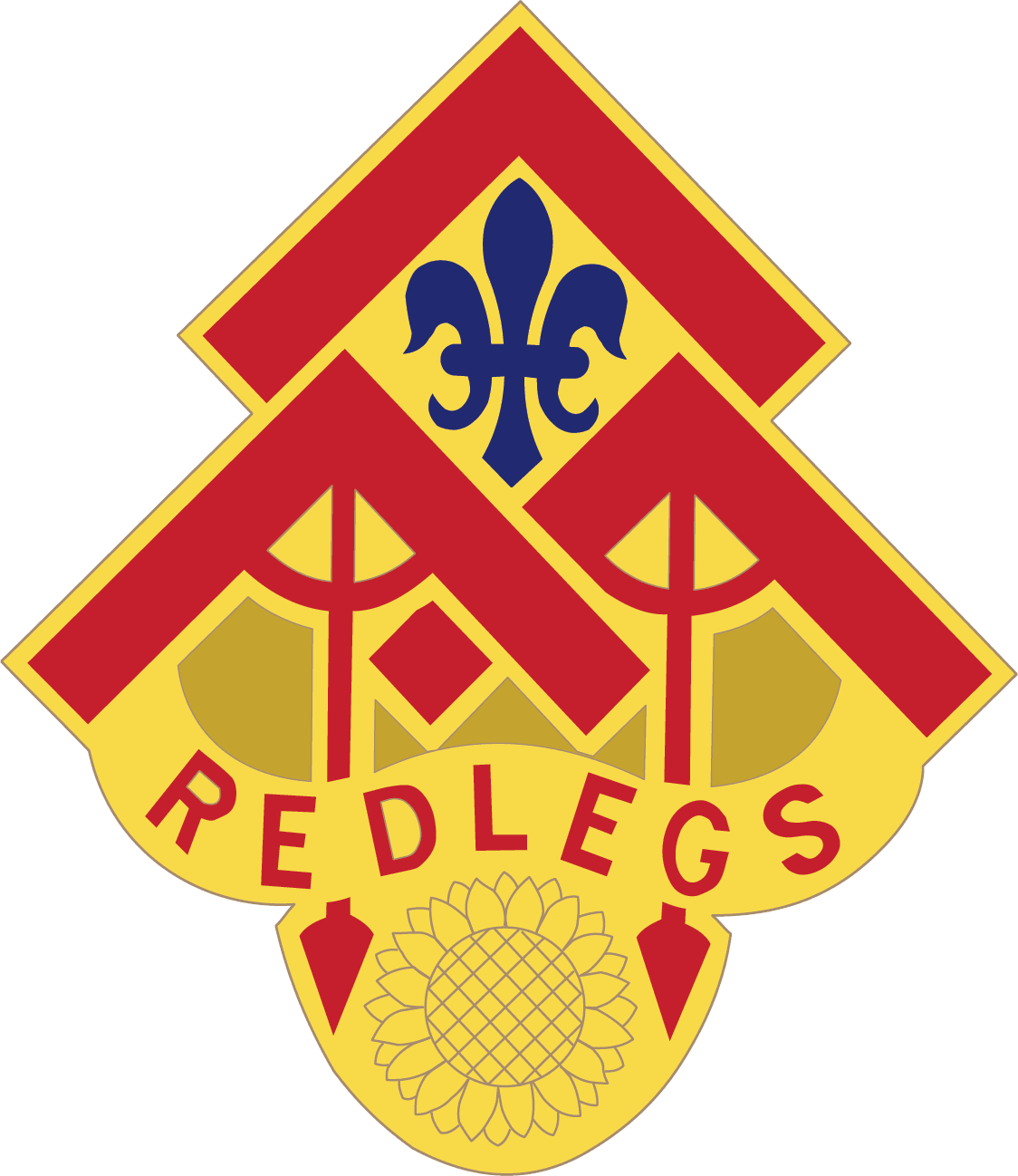
- Distinctive unit insignia

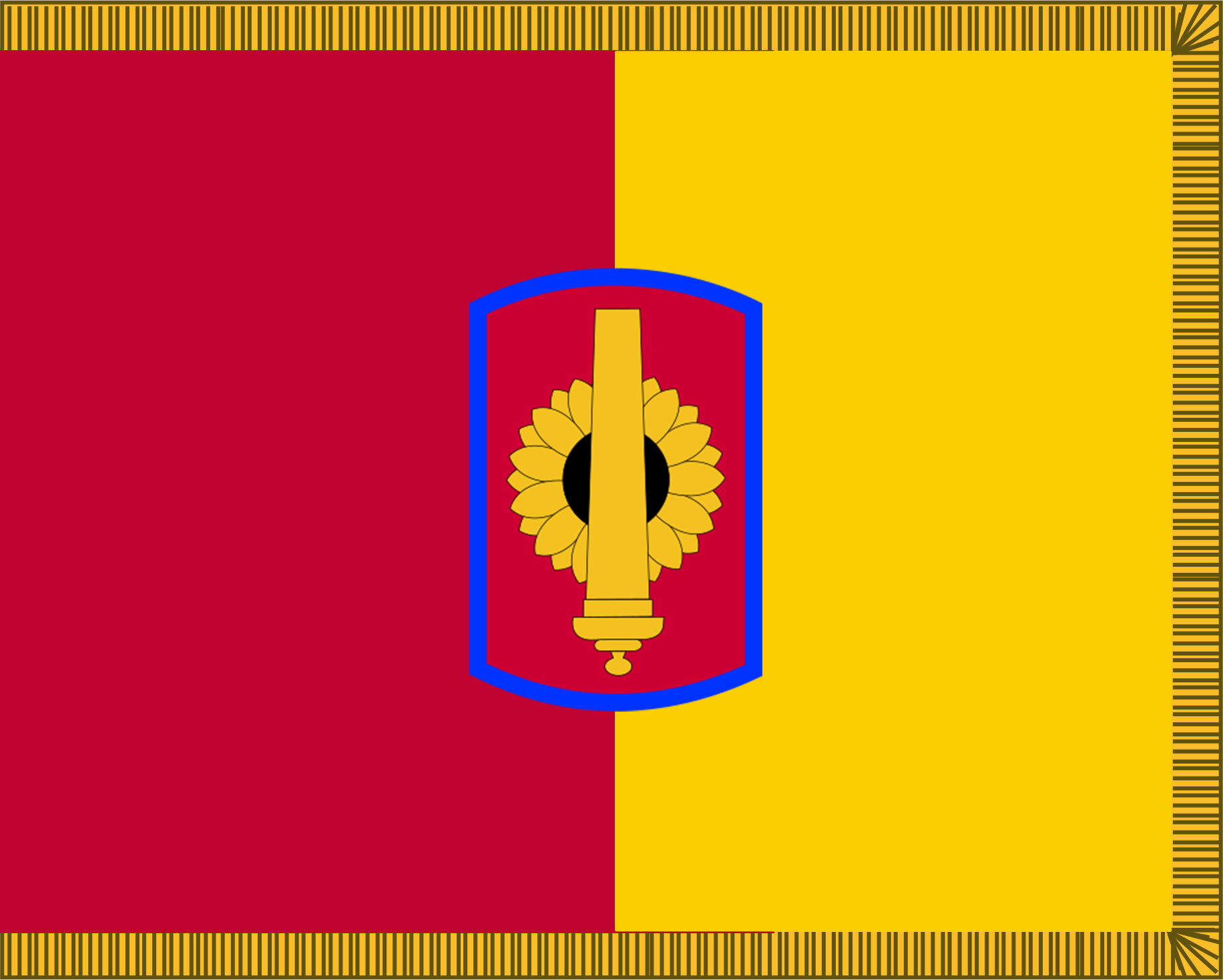
- 130th Field Artillery Brigade Flag

The 130th Field Artillery Brigade is a field artillery brigade of the United States Army, provided by the Kansas Army National Guard and headquartered in Manhattan, Kansas.

The 130th Field Artillery history in the Kansas Army National Guard dates back to 1917, where its lineage as part of the 35th Infantry Division can be traced through both World Wars, the Korean War and, most recently, the war in Iraq 2003-2011. On June 1, 1978, the 130th was redesignated as the 130th Field Artillery Brigade.

In 1985, it was again designated as the 35th Division Artillery with the reactivation of the 35th Infantry Division. The 130th was reconstituted again on Sept. 2, 1997, in the Kansas Army National Guard in Topeka. Following its Operation Iraqi Freedom deployment, the brigade was inactivated on Nov. 10, 2007.

The brigade was reactivated on October 19, 2014.

== Organization ==
- 130th Field Artillery Brigade, in Manhattan (KS) — (Kansas Army National Guard)
  - Headquarters and Headquarters Battery, 130th Field Artillery Brigade, in Manhattan (KS)
  - 1st Battalion, 129th Field Artillery Regiment, in Maryville (MO) (M777A2) — (Missouri Army National Guard)
    - Headquarters and Headquarters Battery, 1st Battalion, 129th Field Artillery Regiment, in Maryville (MO)
    - Battery A, 1st Battalion, 119th Field Artillery Regiment, in Albany (MO)
    - Battery B, 1st Battalion, 119th Field Artillery Regiment, in Chillicothe (MO)
    - Battery C, 1st Battalion, 119th Field Artillery Regiment, in Independence (MO)
    - 1128th Forward Support Company, in Marshall (MO)
  - 2nd Battalion, 130th Field Artillery Regiment, in Hiawatha (KS) (M142 HIMARS) — (Kansas Army National Guard)
    - Headquarters and Headquarters Battery, 2nd Battalion, 130th Field Artillery Regiment, in Hiawatha (KS)
      - Detachment 1, Headquarters and Headquarters Battery, 2nd Battalion, 130th Field Artillery Regiment, in Marysville (KS)
    - Battery A, 2nd Battalion, 130th Field Artillery Regiment, in Holton (KS)
      - Detachment 1, Battery A, 2nd Battalion, 130th Field Artillery Regiment, in Marysville (KS)
    - Battery B, 2nd Battalion, 130th Field Artillery Regiment, in Paola (KS)
      - Detachment 1, Battery B, 2nd Battalion, 130th Field Artillery Regiment, in Kansas City (KS)
    - 250th Forward Support Company, in Ottawa (KS)
      - Detachment 1, 250th Forward Support Company, in Clay Center (KS)
  - 1st Battalion, 161st Field Artillery Regiment, in Hutchinson (KS) (M109A6 Paladin) — (Kansas Army National Guard)
    - Headquarters and Headquarters Battery, 1st Battalion, 161st Field Artillery Regiment, in Hutchinson (KS)
    - Battery A, 1st Battalion, 161st Field Artillery Regiment, in Dodge City (KS)
    - Battery B, 1st Battalion, 161st Field Artillery Regiment, in Abilene (KS)
    - Battery C, 1st Battalion, 161st Field Artillery Regiment, in Newton (KS)
    - 1161st Forward Support Company, in Wichita (KS)
      - Detachment 1, 1161st Forward Support Company, in Pratt (KS)
  - 1st Battalion, 214th Field Artillery Regiment, in Elberton (GA) (M109A6 Paladin) — (Georgia Army National Guard)
    - Headquarters and Headquarters Battery, 1st Battalion, 214th Field Artillery Regiment, in Elberton (GA)
    - Battery A, 1st Battalion, 214th Field Artillery Regiment, in Hartwell (GA)
    - Battery B, 1st Battalion, 214th Field Artillery Regiment, in Thomson (GA)
    - Battery C, 1st Battalion, 214th Field Artillery Regiment, in Ellenwood (GA)
    - 1161st Forward Support Company, in Washington (GA)
  - 997th Brigade Support Battalion, in Hays (KS) — (Kansas Army National Guard)
    - Headquarters Support Battery, 997th Brigade Support Battalion, in Hays (KS)
    - Detachment 1, Headquarters Support Battery, 997th Brigade Support Battalion, in Colby (KS)
    - 137th Transportation Company (Medium Truck) (PLS), in Olathe (KS)
      - Detachment 1, 137th Transportation Company (Medium Truck) (PLS), in Topeka (KS)
    - 170th Ordnance Company (Support Maintenance), in Wichita (KS)
    - 330th Signal Company, in Wichita (KS)
