= 127th Field Artillery Regiment =

- Active: 1916-1919; 1919-1945; 1948-2007
- Country: United States
- Allegiance: United States
- Branch: Field artillery
- Size: Regiment
- Motto: Via Vi ("A Way by Force")
- Engagements: World War I; Meuse-Argonne; Alsace 1918; Lorraine 1918; World War II; Normandy; Northern France; Rhineland; Ardennes-Alsace; Central Europe

The 127th Field Artillery Regiment was a field artillery regiment of the Kansas Army National Guard that traced its lineage to 1916. The 1st Battalion, the only active unit of the regiment, was inactivated in 2007.

== History ==
=== Pancho Villa Expedition and World War I ===
The 2nd Separate Company, Infantry, was organized on 12 April 1916 in the Kansas National Guard at Eureka, Kansas. It was mustered into Federal service for the Pancho Villa Expedition on 23 June at Fort Riley, Kansas, later being converted and redesignated on 7 July as Troop A, Cavalry. It was mustered out of Federal service on 6 March 1917 at Fort Riley. On 24 July, it was expanded, reorganized, and redesignated as the 1st Squadron, Cavalry. It was drafted into Federal service on 5 August 1917, after U.S. entry into World War I, and reorganized and redesignated on 13 September, less Troop A, as the 110th Train Headquarters and Military Police, an element of the 35th Division. Troop A was concurrently reorganized and redesignated as Headquarters Troop, 35th Division. The 110th Train Headquarters and Military Police was broken up on 26 October 1918 and reorganized as the 110th Train Headquarters and the 35th Military Police Company, elements of the 35th Division. The Headquarters Troop, 35th Division, 110th Train Headquarters, and 35th Military Police Company were demobilized in May 1919 at Camp Funston, Kansas.

=== Interwar period ===
==== Nebraska lineage ====
During World War I, the 4th Nebraska Infantry had been converted into the 127th Field Artillery Regiment and assigned to the 34th Division. After the war, the regiment was allotted to the state of Nebraska as a corps artillery unit assigned to the VII Corps. Nebraska subsequently indicated it was unable to organize the unit, and it was placed on the "Deferred National Guard" list in 1923. It was demobilized in an unorganized status with the abandonment of the list in 1927.

==== Kansas lineage ====
On 27 September 1919, a cavalry squadron was organized in the Kansas National Guard, known as the 1st Squadron, Cavalry. On 4 November 1921, it became the 1st Squadron, 114th Cavalry Regiment, an element of the 24th Cavalry Division. On 10 January 1925, the squadron was expanded, reorganized, and redesignated on 10 January 1925 as the 114th Cavalry, with the regimental headquarters federally recognized at Topeka, Kansas. The location of the headquarters was changed 12 March 1926 to Rosedale, Kansas, and on 27 January 1934, back to Topeka. On 1 October 1940, the 114th Cavalry and elements of its parent 24th Cavalry Division were converted and redesignated as the 127th Field Artillery Regiment. The regiment was concurrently relieved from assignment to the 24th Cavalry Division and assigned to the 35th Division.

Conversion of 114th Cavalry Regiment, 1940
114th Cavalry unit	Location	127th Field Artillery unit
HQ	Topeka	HQ (part)
HQ Troop	Topeka	HQ Battery
Machine Gun Troop (part)	Kansas City	HQ Battery, 2nd Battalion
Machine Gun Troop (part)	Kansas City	HQ Battery, 3rd Battalion
Band	Kansas City	Band
Medical Detachment	Coffeyville	Medical Detachment
HQ, 1st Squadron	Topeka	HQ, 1st Battalion
Troop A	Iola	Battery A
Troop B	Coffeyville	Battery B
HQ, 2nd Squadron	Wichita	HQ, 2nd Battalion
Troop E	Wichita	Battery C
Troop F	Pleasanton	Battery D
HQ, 3rd Squadron	Lawrence	HQ, 3rd Battalion
Troop I	Lawrence	Battery E
Troop K	Paola	Battery F
HQ, 24th Cavalry Division	Topeka	HQ (part)
HQ Detachment, 24th Cavalry Division	Kansas City	HQ Battery, 1st Battalion

=== World War II ===
On 1 March 1942, the 35th Division was converted into a triangular division. As part of the reorganization, the division's field artillery regiments were eliminated. The 2nd Battalion, 127th Field Artillery Regiment was reorganized and redesignated as the 127th Field Artillery Battalion, an element of the 35th Infantry Division. The Headquarters Battery was consolidated with the Pioneer Company, 635th Tank Destroyer Battalion, the 1st Battalion was redesignated as the 1st Battalion, 195th Field Artillery Regiment, while the regimental band was assigned to Fort Snelling, Minnesota. After overseas service in England, France, Belgium, Luxembourg, the Netherlands, and Germany, the 127th Field Artillery Battalion was inactivated on 20 November 1945 at Camp Breckinridge, Kentucky.

=== Cold War to 2007 ===
The regiment was reorganized and federally recognized on 24 May 1948 with headquarters at Ottawa, Kansas. On 1 May 1959, it was reorganized and redesignated as the 127th Artillery, a parent regiment under the Combat Arms Regimental System. Its 1st Rocket Howitzer Battalion was an element of the 35th Infantry Division. Reorganized 1 April 1963 to consist of the 1st Howitzer Battalion. Reorganized 15 December 1967 to consist of the 1st Battalion. redesignated 1 February 1972 as the 127th Field Artillery. Withdrawn 1 June 1989 from the Combat Arms Regimental System and reorganized under the United States Army Regimental System. On 16 June 2005, the Headquarters and Headquarters Battery, 1st Battalion, 127th Field Artillery, based in Ottawa, was alerted for Operation Iraqi Freedom and in June-July, was mobilized at Fort Lewis, Washington. Sent to Camp Travis, Iraq on October 1, 2005, they assumed the force protection mission, providing protection for personnel like the American ambassador, United Aide Mission to Iraq’s Special Representative to the Secretary General, the Anti-Terrorism Task Force, and any other embassy personnel requiring movement inside and outside of the international zone of Baghdad. They returned home on 19 October 2006, and a welcome home ceremony was held at Lee Arena on the Washburn University campus in Topeka. On 28 January 2007, the 1st Battalion was inactivated.
