= 63rd Aviation Brigade =

63rd Theater Aviation Brigade
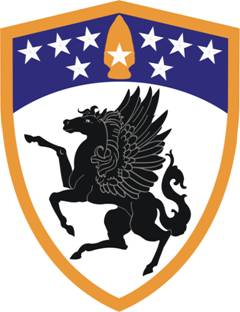
- 63rd Aviation Brigade shoulder sleeve insignia
- Active: 1986 – present
- Country: United States
- Allegiance: United States Army National Guard
- Type: Theater Aviation brigade
- Role: Aviation
- Size: Brigade
- Part of: Kentucky Army National Guard
- Garrison/HQ: Frankfort, Kentucky
- Nickname: "Wings of Thunder"
- Motto: Unbridled Thunder (Formerly: Surpass the Standard)
- Colors: Yellow and Blue

Commanders
- Current commander: Lieutenant Colonel Gabriel Spicer

Insignia
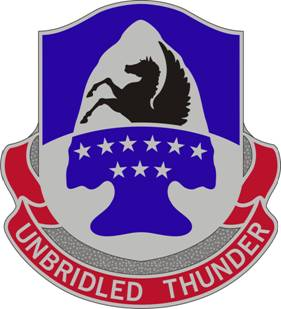
- Distinctive unit insignia

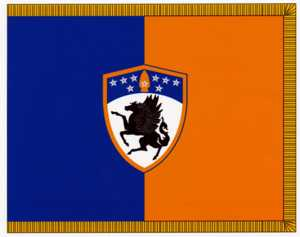
- Standard

The 63rd Theater Aviation Brigade is an aviation brigade of the United States Army. Headquartered in Frankfort, Kentucky as an element of the Kentucky Army National Guard. Elements of the 63rd Theater Aviation Brigade are also part of the New York Army National Guard.

Founded 15 September 1986 as Headquarters and Headquarters Company, Aviation Brigade, 35th Infantry Division, it was reorganized on 1 September 1995 as the 63rd Aviation Group and relieved from assignment to the 35th Infantry Division. At a later date it was upgraded to brigade status as the 63rd Theater Aviation Brigade. Both the Distinctive Unit Insignia and the current Shoulder Sleeve Insignia were approved in 2007.

The unit is assigned to providing support to United States Army North aviation missions in the event of a disaster inside the United States, as well as support to civil activities within the State of Kentucky, including security and support for the Kentucky Derby. The unit has also provided support to United States Southern Command missions. Elements of the Brigade have also deployed to Southwest Asia in support of the Global War on Terrorism.
