= 1st Battalion, 161st Field Artillery Regiment =

1st Battalion 161st Field Artillery Regiment
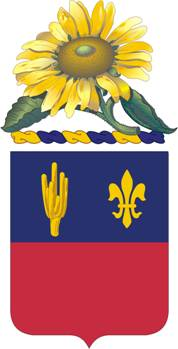
- 161st Field Artillery Regiment coat of arms
- Active: 1921–present
- Country: United States
- Branch: United States Army
- Type: Field artillery
- Role: General support
- Size: Battalion
- Part of: 130th Field Artillery Brigade, Kansas Army National Guard
- Garrison/HQ: Hutchinson, Kansas
- Nickname: "Second Kansas"
- Motto: Faire Sans Dire (To Do Without Saying)
- Equipment: 155 SP howitzer M109A6 "Paladin"
- Decorations: French Croix de Guerre

Commanders
- Commander: LTC Kyle E. Bell
- Command Sergeant Major: CSM Danny Sullivan

Insignia
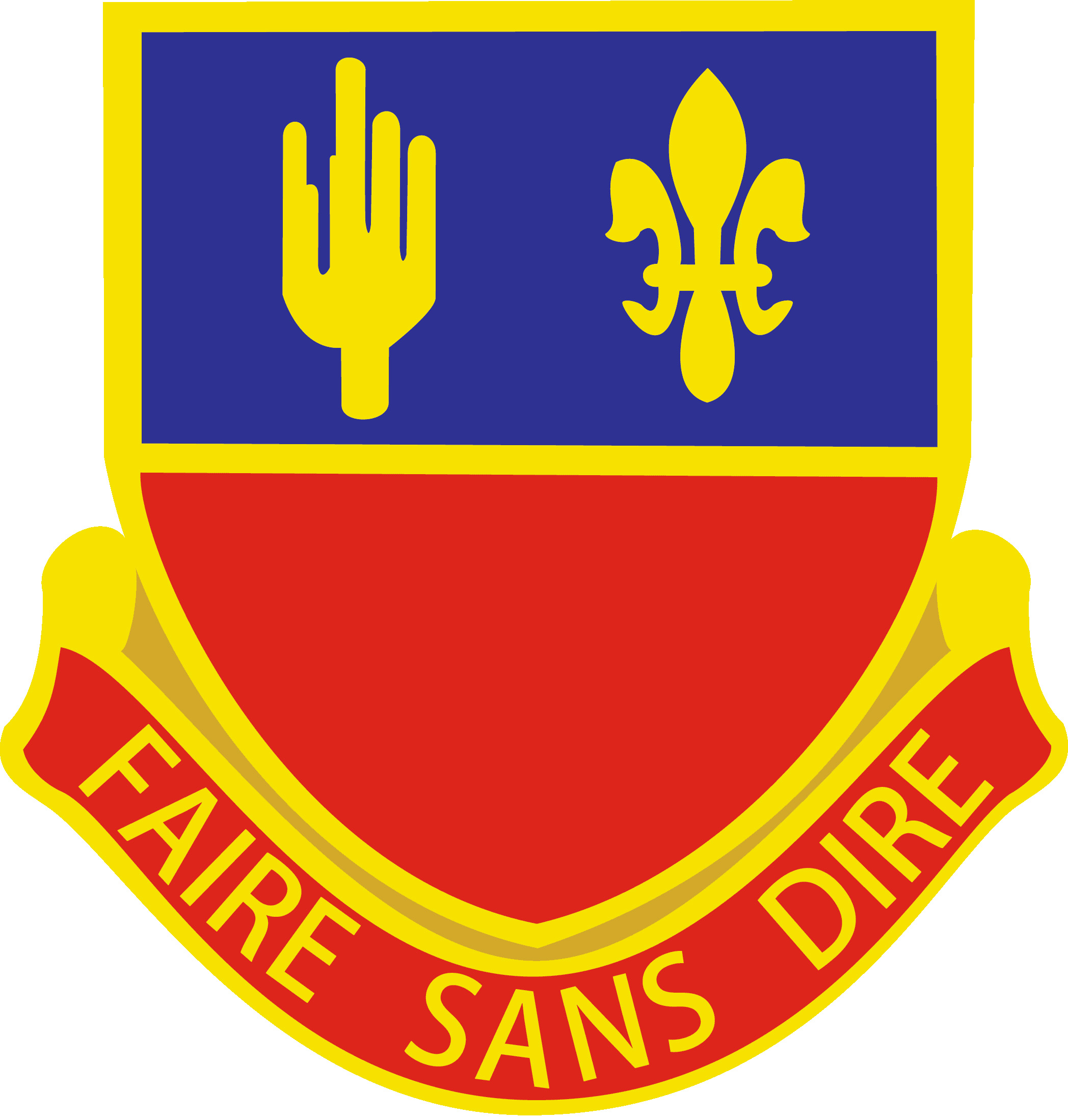
- Distinctive unit insignia

The 1st Battalion, 161st Field Artillery Regiment is a field artillery battalion of the Kansas Army National Guard. Like many National Guard field artillery battalions, it is the sole active battalion in its regiment. The battalion is currently headquartered in Hutchinson, and consists of three firing batteries: Alpha (Dodge City), Bravo (Abilene), Charlie (Newton), and a Headquarters Battery (Hutchinson). The battalion has a direct support relationship with the 1161st Forward Support Company (Wichita & Pratt). The battalion is subordinated to the 130th Field Artillery Brigade (Manhattan).

== History ==
=== Mexican Border and World War I ===
The 1-161 FA has its roots as the 2nd Infantry Regiment of the Kansas Volunteer Militia, which was organized from existing units in 1880. The regiment was mustered into federal service in June 1916 for duty guarding the Mexican border while Regular Army units pursued revolutionary leader Francisco "Pancho" Villa. The regiment served for five months at Eagle Pass, Texas. On 5 August 1917, the 2nd Infantry Regiment was drafted into federal service and in October, was consolidated with the 1st Infantry Regiment and re-designated the 137th Infantry Regiment, assigned to the 35th Division. The regiment saw duty in France and participated in the Meuse-Argonne offensive. They were demobilized in May 1919, after 34 months of active duty service.

=== Interwar period ===
Pursuant to the National Defense Act of 1920, the 161st Field Artillery was constituted as a new 75 mm gun field artillery regiment in the National Guard on 1 November 1921, and was assigned to the reconstituted 35th Division's 60th Field Artillery Brigade. The state of Kansas had previously been authorized by the Militia Bureau to organize a field artillery regiment, which it designated the 2nd Field Artillery; only one battery, Battery A, had been organized at Salina on 20 April 1921. The remainder of the regiment's units necessary to authorize the organization of the two battalion headquarters were formed by the end of 1922, and the regimental headquarters was organized on 25 May 1923 under the command of Lieutenant Colonel Milton R. McLean. He was succeeded by Colonel George H. Wark on 2 April 1925 and Colonel Nels A. Anderson on 19 January 1933.

The regiment was originally horse-drawn, but converted to truck-drawn on 1 July 1933. The regiment, or elements thereof, was called up to perform the following state emergency duties: three batteries to perform road patrols and bridge guard duties in connection with the Kansas State Penitentiary breakout at Lansing, 19–20 January 1934; 2nd Battalion for strike duty in the coal fields near Columbus, 17–25 June 1935; 1st Battalion for strike duty in the coal fields near Columbus, 28 June–6 August 1935. The regiment conducted annual summer training at Fort Riley, and some years at Fort Sill, Oklahoma. For at least one year, in 1939, the regiment trained 37 battery-grade Organized Reserve field artillery officers of the 89th Division at Fort Riley. On 23 December 1940 the regiment was inducted into federal service and arrived at Camp Joseph T. Robinson, near Little Rock, Arkansas, on 4 January 1941. The regiment subsequently participated in the Louisiana Maneuvers in August-September 1941.

In December 1941, the regiment, along with the rest of the 35th Division, was moved to California to defend against a possible Japanese invasion. On 1 March 1942, the regiment was divided into the 161st Field Artillery Battalion (the former 1st Battalion), assigned to the 35th Infantry Division, and the 2nd Battalion, 195th Field Artillery Regiment (the former 2nd Battalion), which became a separate unit. The 35th Infantry Division began training for overseas combat in April 1943 at Camp Rucker, Alabama, and subsequently participated in the Third Army Tennessee Maneuvers in November-December 1943 before moving to Camp Butner, North Carolina in January 1944. The division arrived in England in May 1944, and returned to the United States in November 1945.

=== Cold War to present ===
From 1946 to 1998, the 161st's designation was changed nine times from regiment to battalion, with various naming conventions. In March 1996, 1st Battalion, 161st Field Artillery converted from M110 8-inch howitzers to M109A5 howitzers but continued as a general support battalion of the 35th Infantry Division Artillery. During the same reorganization, Battery F, 161st Field Artillery was organized as a separate 8-inch general support battery of the division artillery.

In 2001, the battalion was mobilized for Operation Noble Eagle and provided force protection and gate security at McConnell Air Force Base, Fort Leavenworth, and Fort Riley. Members of Bravo Battery, which was based out of Pratt, were deployed in 2005 to Iraq in support of Operation Iraqi Freedom. One soldier died while serving in Iraq. The battery returned in July 2007. That same month, the rest of the battalion was notified that they would be deployed to Iraq. In October of that year Headquarters Battery, Alpha Battery, Charlie Battery and the 1161st FSC began pre-mobilization training and deployed in February 2008. Headquarters Battery was sent to Baghdad, while the remainder of the battalion, with reinforcements from Battery E, 1161st FSC, were sent to FOB Grizzly to provide force protection. One soldier, Specialist Ronald Schmidt, stationed in FOB Grizzly, died on that deployment as well. The battalion was again mobilized in February 2011 for deployment to Camp Lemonnier in Djibouti. The battalion deployed with full strength, augmented with both Battery E, 1161st FSC, and the 35th Military Police Company. They returned to the United States in February 2012.

In June 2018, Charlie Battery deployed in support of Operation Spartan Shield with the Mississippi Army National Guard's 155th Armored Brigade Combat Team as a battery in the 2nd Battalion, 114th Field Artillery. The battery deployed contingents to the Saudi Arabia, Iraq, and Syria and returned in March 2019. Subsequently, Charlie Battery was awarded the 2019 Alexander Hamilton Award as the best field artillery battery in the U.S. Army National Guard.

In January 2021, the battalion sent a composite battery made up of soldiers from all four batteries to conduct security operations in the Washington D.C. capital region for the presidential inauguration.

In September of 2021, the battalion was tasked with leading a combined arms task force led by the battalion commander for emergency response to Hurricane Ida relief efforts in Louisiana. The task force facilitated humanitarian relief to citizens of New Orleans, provided critical infrastructure security, and route clearance throughout western Louisiana. The battalion, with over 280 soldiers and 25 airmen, operated three points of distribution for food, water, ice, and tarps. The task force also cleared over 250 miles of blocked roads and levee gates. The Battalion provided security for six points of distribution, two marinas, and an airport. The battalion conducted sweeps and utility isolations in the worst devastated town of Grand Isle.
