= Junior J. Spurrier =

United States Army Medal of Honor recipient

Junior James Spurrier
- Born: James Ira Spurrier, Jr. December 14, 1922; Castlewood, Virginia, U.S.
- Died: February 25, 1984 (aged 61); Tennessee, U.S.
- Military career
- Allegiance: United States
- Branch: United States Army
- Service years: 1940-1945; 1947-1951
- Rank: Technical Sergeant
- Nickname: "Task Force Spurrier"
- Service number: 13018254
- Units: Company G, 134th Infantry Regiment, 35th Infantry Division
- Conflicts: World War II; Asiatic-Pacific Theater; Normandy; Northern France; Rhineland; Ardennes-Alsace; Central Europe
- Awards: Medal of Honor; Distinguished Service Cross

Junior James Spurrier, born James Ira Spurrier Jr., was a United States Army soldier who received the United States' two highest military decorations for valor—the Medal of Honor and Distinguished Service Cross—for his heroic actions in World War II.

== Early life and education ==
Spurrier was born on December 14, 1922, in the Castlewood area of Russell County, western Virginia to farmer and Norfolk and Western Railway locomotive fireman and engineer James I. Spurrier and his wife Ruby, one of six children. The family suffered due to the Great Depression, moving frequently, and ended up in Bluefield, West Virginia, where the younger Spurrier found work in a Civilian Conservation Corps camp. His mother died in the summer of 1940, and he decided to enlist in the Army.

== Career ==
By the fall of 1940, Spurrier was living in Wise County, Virginia. On September 25, 1940, he voluntarily enlisted into the United States Army from Richmond, Virginia. Spurrier filled his name in the wrong blanks in his enlistment paperwork, and became known to the Army throughout his time in service as "Junior J. Spurrier."

Sent overseas on April 20, 1942, he first served in the infantry in the Pacific Theater. Injured in New Guinea in late 1943, he was returned to the United States for medical treatment, first to Camp Carson, Colorado, then to San Francisco, California. Deemed fit for duty, Spurrier was sent overseas again in June 1944 at his own request. He was eventually assigned to Company G of the 134th Infantry Regiment, 35th Infantry Division, as a replacement private on July 19, 1944. On July 26, 1944, he was promoted to staff sergeant and became a messenger and scout. On September 16, 1944, near Lay-Saint-Christophe, France, he earned the Distinguished Service Cross for spearheading an assault on a stubbornly-defended hill position. While twice positioning himself on an American tank destroyer, Spurrier used its .50 caliber machine gun to kill over a dozen German soldiers and force the surrender of twenty-two others. While fighting on the ground, he personally destroyed two enemy dugouts with hand grenades. Spurrier was awarded a Purple Heart for being wounded in action on September 21, 1944.

=== Medal of Honor actions ===
On November 13, 1944, Spurrier singlehandedly attacked and fought Germans in the village of Achain, France. Spurrier repeatedly returned to his company's command post with prisoners, and replenished his ammunition from both American and enemy weapons to continue his attack on the occupied village. Spurrier earned the Medal of Honor for nearly single-handedly capturing the village of Achain that day; the medal was presented to Spurrier by Lieutenant General William Hood Simpson, commander of the Ninth United States Army, during a ceremony on March 6, 1945.

Staff Sergeant Junior J. Spurrier's official Medal of Honor citation reads:

For conspicuous gallantry and intrepidity at risk of his life above and beyond the call of duty in action against the enemy at Achain, France, on 13 November 1944. At 2 p.m., Company G attacked the village of Achain from the east. S/Sgt. Spurrier armed with a BAR passed around the village and advanced alone. Attacking from the west, he immediately killed 3 Germans. From this time until dark, S/Sgt. Spurrier, using at different times his BAR and M1 rifle, American and German rocket launchers, a German automatic pistol, and hand grenades, continued his solitary attack against the enemy regardless of all types of small-arms and automatic-weapons fire. As a result of his heroic actions he killed an officer and 24 enlisted men and captured 2 officers and 2 enlisted men. His valor has shed fresh honor on the U.S. Armed Forces.

Spurrier was wounded again on December 9, 1944, receiving a second Purple Heart. He was transferred to Company K of the 134th Infantry Regiment on April 24, 1945, and returned to the United States soon after. He was discharged from the U.S. Army on June 19, 1945. Spurrier had a younger brother, George, who also served in the Army and was killed in action in France on July 28, 1944, while with the 314th Infantry Regiment, 79th Infantry Division.

== Later life and death ==
Spurrier was noted as an extraordinarily brave and independent prankster who often clashed with his commanders, and went absent without leave several times during his service. Discharged after World War II, he attempted to go into business and had a brief stint as a pitcher with the Galax Leafs of the Class D Blue Ridge League before re-enlisting in the U.S. Army in 1947. He was elevated to the rank of technical sergeant and placed on recruiting duty. He had a severe problem with alcohol, and was demoted to the rank of private in 1950; Spurrier deserted his post during the Korean War and the Army gave him an honorable discharge in 1951 rather than court-martial him.

Spurrier had a turbulent and remarkable life after the military. He had a difficult time adjusting to civilian life, possibly due to posttraumatic stress disorder, and had several run-ins with the law in Virginia and Maryland. He eventually served three jail sentences, being released for the last time in 1969. Spurrier became a teetotaler, ran a radio and television repair business, and retired to a cabin in eastern Tennessee.

Junior J. Spurrier died in relative obscurity on February 25, 1984, at the age of 61 after a lengthy illness. He was survived by a brother, a sister, and a daughter. He is buried in Mountain Home National Cemetery (Section HH, Row 15, Grave 8), in Johnson City, Tennessee.

A memorial to Spurrier was dedicated at the Mercer County War Museum on July 2, 2006. Several of Spurrier's original awards were believed lost, but were located in November 2011. Spurrier's Medal of Honor and other medals were presented to his two surviving sisters in a ceremony held on December 2, 2011.

== See also ==
- List of Medal of Honor recipients

== Notes ==
1. Conflicting information exists as to Junior J. Spurrier's early life and his date and place of enlistment into the military. Official United States Army enlistment records state that Spurrier's place of residence in September 1940 was Wise County, Virginia and that he voluntarily enlisted at Richmond, Virginia, on September 25, 1940. General orders from the 35th Infantry Division for the award of Spurrier's two Purple Hearts likewise say that he "entered military service" from Virginia. Conversely, Spurrier's Medal of Honor citation says that he was born in Russell County, Kentucky, and "entered service" at Riggs, Kentucky.

2. One Bluefield Daily Telegraph article lists his service in the Pacific as twenty-two months, while another says thirty-one months; the latter may be his service in the Army as a whole up to the point when he returned to the United States.
