= Chambrey =

French-German commune in Grand Est, France

- Commune
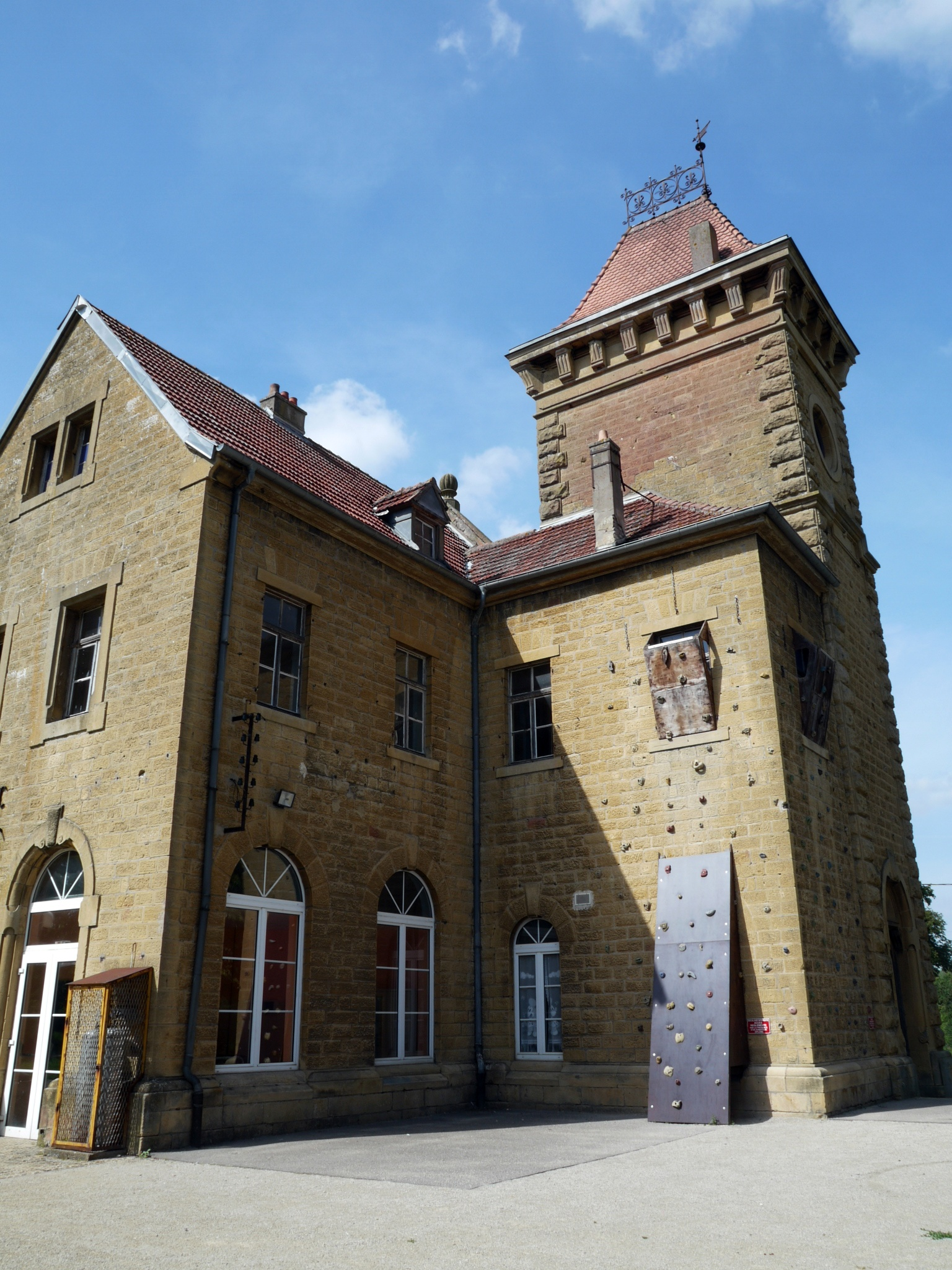
- Old train station of Chambrey

- Coat of arms
- Location of Chambrey
- Location within France Location within Grand Est
- Coordinates: 48°47′16″N 6°27′37″E
- Country: France
- Region: Grand Est
- Department: Moselle
- Arrondissement: Sarrebourg-Château-Salins
- Canton: Le Saulnois
- Intercommunality: CC du Saulnois

Government
  - Mayor (2020–2026): Patrick Peiffert
- Area^{1}: 14.38 km^{2} (5.55 sq mi)
- Elevation: 219 m (719 ft)
- Highest elevation: 313 m (1,027 ft)
- Lowest elevation: 195 m (640 ft)
- Population (2023): 317
  - Density: 22.0/km^{2} (57.1/sq mi)
- Time zone: UTC+01:00 (CET)
  - Summer (DST): UTC+02:00 (CEST)
- INSEE/Postal code: 57126 /57170
- ^{1} French Land Register data, which excludes lakes, ponds, glaciers > 1 km^{2} (0.386 sq mi or 247 acres) and river estuaries.

Chambrey (French pronunciation: [ʃɑ̃bʁɛ]; German: Kambrich) is a commune in the Moselle department in Grand Est in north-eastern France.

== See also ==
- Communes of the Moselle department
