= 35th Infantry Division (United States) =

Infantry division of the United States Army

- Shoulder sleeve insignia
- Active: 18 July 1917–26 May 1919; 1 July 1926–7 December 1945; 5 October 1946–1 April 1963; 25 August 1984–present
- Country: United States
- Branch: United States Army National Guard
- Type: Infantry
- Role: Headquarters
- Size: Division
- Part of: Army National Guard
- Headquarters: Fort Leavenworth
- Nickname: "Santa Fe Division"
- Colors: Red and blue
- Campaigns: World War I; Meuse-Argonne; Alsace 1918; Lorraine 1918; World War II; Normandy; Northern France; Rhineland; Ardennes-Alsace; Central Europe; Operation Joint Guardian; Operation Inherent Resolve
- Website: 35th Infantry Division

Commanders
- Current commander: Maj. Gen. John W. Rueger

Insignia
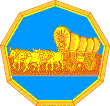
- Distinctive insignia

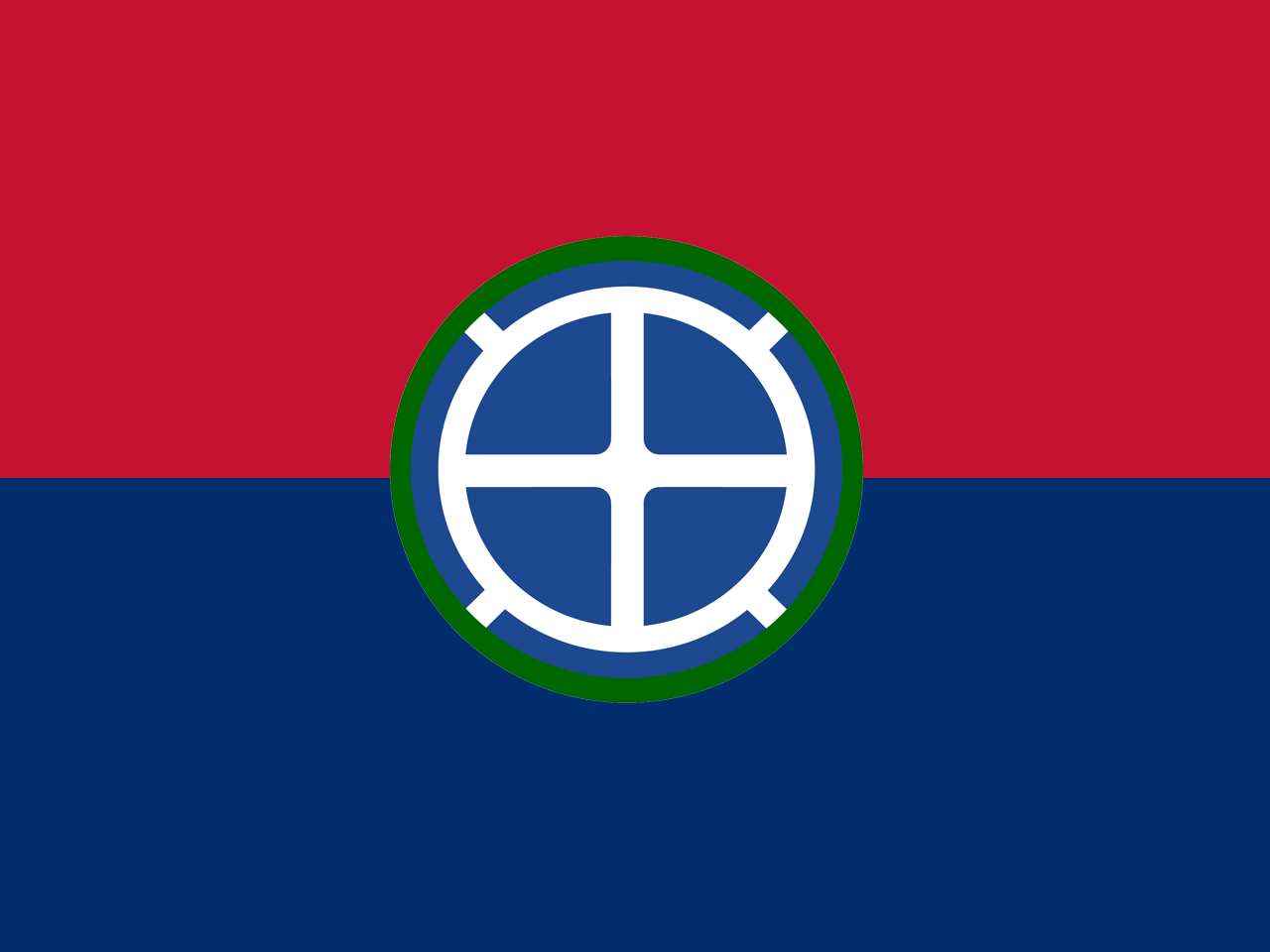
- Flag of the United States Army 35th Infantry Division

The 35th Infantry Division (formerly known as the 35th Division) is a formation of the Army National Guard, with its headquarters located at Fort Leavenworth, Kansas. The division is primarily composed of Army National Guard units from Missouri and Kansas, though it also includes subordinate units from other states. While the Kansas National Guard provides the headquarters element, the division is federally funded and maintained through the Department of the Army under the Department of Defense.

== History ==
=== World War I ===
==== World War I Combat chronicle ====
The 35th Division was originally constituted by the Militia Bureau in early 1917 as the 14th Division, made up of troops from Kansas and Missouri.

On 18 July 1917, over three months after the American entry into World War I, the War Department directed the organization of the unit, now redesignated the 35th Division, and on 5 August, the National Guard was drafted into federal service.

Concentration of divisional troops at Camp Doniphan, near Fort Sill, Oklahoma, began in late August, and training began on 8 September. During October, about 3,000 draftees from Camp Funston, Kansas, most of whom were from Kansas and Missouri, joined the division, and in spring 1918, more men came from Camp Funston, Camp Travis, Texas, and Fort Leavenworth, Kansas.

On 2 April 1918, the division, commanded from its inception by Major General William M. Wright, moved from Camp Mills, New York, and Camp Merritt, New Jersey, to the Brooklyn, Hoboken, New York, and Philadelphia Ports of Embarkation, where it received approximately 2,000 replacements to bring it up to full strength.

Elements of the division sailed for England and France between 16 April and 8 June, with the elements that landed in England (Southampton and Liverpool) moving shortly to Le Havre, France.

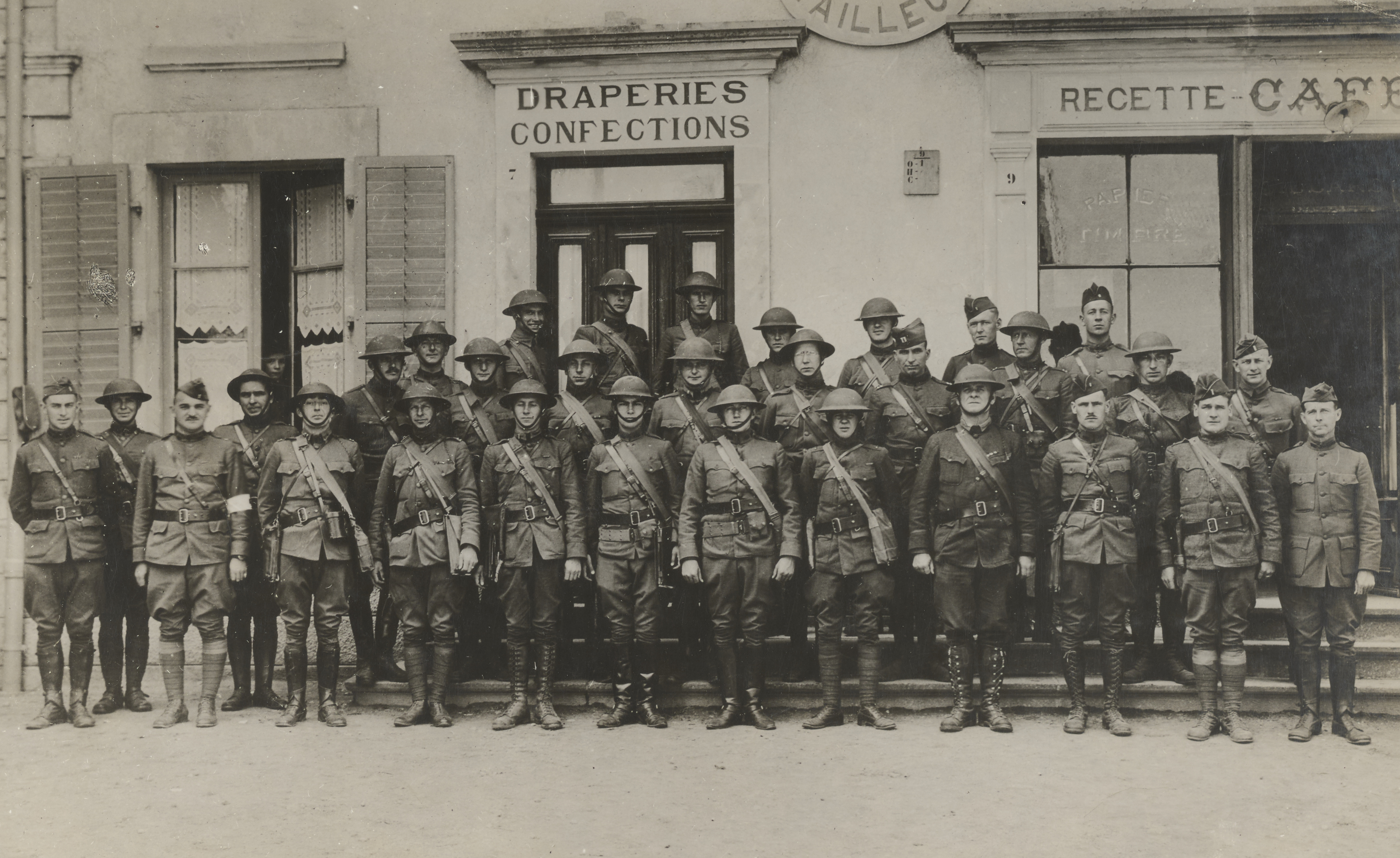
Group of officers of the 129th Machine Gun Battalion, 35th Division, at Vagney, Vosges, France, August 10, 1918.

The 35th Division served first, an infantry brigade at a time, in the Vosges mountains between 30 June and 13 August. The whole division served in the Gérardmer sector, Alsace, from 14 August to 1 September. Having trained in trench warfare tactics in the United States and experiencing a number of command changes at multiple echelons and arms of service on short notice, the division, now commanded by Major General Peter E. Traub in place of Wright, was committed during the opening stages of the Meuse–Argonne offensive, which would ultimately become the largest and bloodiest battle in American military history, from 26 to 30 September. American historian Robert Hugh Ferrell, in his 2004 book Collapse at Meuse-Argonne: The Failure of the Missouri-Kansas Division, concluded that the division was unprepared for the conventional and combined arms tactics of the Hundred Days Offensive that often eschewed trench-to-trench combat in favor of strongpoints and open battlefields.

Despite making good progress on its first day, 26 September, the division's operations became more and more disorganized over the following days as communications and command difficulties combined with exhaustion and increasingly heavy casualties. For fear of complete collapse, the division was withdrawn from the front on 1 October and replaced with the veteran 1st Division. The division next served in the Sommedieue sector, 15 October to 6 November, but did not participate in any further major combat service before the Armistice with Germany on November 11, 1918, which finally brought an end to hostilities.

During its combat service, the 35th Division spent ninety-two days in quiet sectors and five in active, advanced twelve and one-half kilometers against resistance, captured 781 prisoners, and lost 1,067 men killed in action or missing and a further 6,216 wounded.

The 35th Division had, as an officer, Harry S. Truman, the future 33rd president of the United States, who commanded battery D of the 129th Field Artillery Regiment and served with it through most of the U.S. involvement in the war.

==== World War I order of battle ====
Units of the 35th Division during World War I included:

- Headquarters, 35th Division
- 69th Infantry Brigade
  - 137th Infantry Regiment (1st Kansas Infantry less band, and 2nd Kansas Infantry)
  - 138th Infantry Regiment (1st Missouri Infantry, and 5th Missouri Infantry less band)
  - 129th Machine Gun Battalion (2nd Battalion, 2nd Missouri Infantry)
- 70th Infantry Brigade
  - 139th Infantry Regiment (3rd Kansas Infantry, and 4th Missouri Infantry less band)
  - 140th Infantry Regiment (3rd Missouri Infantry, and 6th Missouri Infantry less band)
  - 130th Machine Gun Battalion (3rd Battalion, 2nd Missouri Infantry)
- 60th Field Artillery Brigade
  - 128th Field Artillery Regiment (75 mm) (1st Missouri Field Artillery)
  - 129th Field Artillery Regiment (75 mm) (2nd Missouri Field Artillery and Troop B, Missouri Cavalry)
  - 130th Field Artillery Regiment (155 mm) (1st Kansas Field Artillery)
  - 110th Trench Mortar Battery (Supply Company and Headquarters Company (less band), 2nd Missouri Infantry)
- 128th Machine Gun Battalion (Machine Gun Company and 1st Battalion, 2nd Missouri Infantry)
- 110th Engineer Regiment (1st Separate Battalion Kansas Engineers, 1st Separate Battalion Missouri Engineers, and band, 1st Kansas Infantry)
- 110th Field Signal Battalion (1st Battalion, Kansas Signal Corps)
- Headquarters Troop, 35th Division (Troop A, 1st Squadron Kansas Cavalry)
- 110th Train Headquarters and Military Police (Troops B, C, and D, 1st Squadron Kansas Cavalry)
  - 110th Ammunition Train (National Army men)
  - 110th Supply Train (Supply Train, Missouri National Guard)
  - 110th Engineer Train (Engineer Train, Kansas National Guard)
  - 110th Sanitary Train
    - 137th-140th Ambulance Companies and Field Hospitals (1st and 2nd Kansas Field Hospitals, 1st and 2nd Missouri Field Hospitals, 1st and 2nd Kansas Ambulance Companies, and 1st and 2nd Missouri Ambulance Companies)

==== Commanders ====
- Major General William M. Wright (25 August 1917 – 14 June 1918)
  - Brigadier General Lucien G. Berry (ad interim) (18 September-9 December 1917)
  - Brigadier General Lucien G. Berry (ad interim) (24-25 December 1917)
  - Brigadier General Charles I. Martin (ad interim) (26 December 1917 – 3 January 1918)
- Brigadier General Nathaniel F. McClure (15 June-19 July 1918)
- Major General Peter E. Traub (20 July-26 December 1918)
  - Brigadier General Thomas B. Dugan (ad interim) (1 November, 25 November-6 December 1918)
- Brigadier General Thomas B. Dugan (27 December 1918 – 25 March 1919)
  - Brigadier General Lucien G. Berry (ad interim) (31 January-6 February 1919)
- Major General William M. Wright (26 March-14 May 1919)

=== Interwar period ===
The 1920 amendments to the National Defense Act of 1916 set out the postwar National Guard structure. The 35th Division was reconstituted in the National Guard in 1921, allotted to the states of Kansas, Missouri, and Nebraska of the Seventh Corps Area, and assigned to the VII Corps. In the postwar reorganization of the Army's infantry divisions, they only had two regiments of horse-drawn 75 mm guns, with truck-drawn 155 mm howitzers initially assigned as corps and army artillery because of the belief that they were too tactically immobile. As early as 1922, the Nebraska National Guard found it impossible to organize the VII Corps' 127th Field Artillery Regiment because of a lack of funding and armory space. When suitable modifications were made to the 155 mm howitzer as part of the Army's motorization of field artillery in the early 1930s to allow for high-speed truck traction, 155 mm howitzer regiments were returned to divisions; the 142nd Field Artillery Regiment, a partially-organized General Headquarters Reserve (GHQR) 75 mm gun unit from Arkansas, was converted to 155 mm howitzers and assigned to the 35th Division on 13 July 1931 in lieu of the 127th Field Artillery.

In the 1920s and 1930s, constituent units of the division performed routine training within their respective states as well as various activities policing labor troubles and effecting disaster relief. Arkansas units trained at Camp Pike (later renamed Camp Joseph T. Robinson), Arkansas, Fort Riley, Kansas, near Junction City, or at Fort Sill; Kansas units trained at Fort Riley; Missouri units at Camp Clark, near Nevada, Missouri; Nebraska units at Camp Ashland, near Ashland, Nebraska. Because of continued disputes between the states allotted for the division, the 35th Division commander and his staff were not organized and federally recognized until 1932-1933. Beginning in the summer of 1933, the division staff assembled at Fort Riley for consolidated staff training and did so for the next two years. In the fall of 1935, the staff participated in the Fourth Army command post exercise at Fort Lewis, Washington, and went to camp at Ashland, Nebraska, the following summer. Due to limited funding, all the units of the 35th Division did not gather together in one place for training until the Seventh Corps Area concentration of the Fourth Army maneuvers at Fort Riley, in 1937. In 1938, 180 Organized Reserve officers of the 89th and 102nd Divisions were also provided with training by the division. The division also concentrated at Camp Ripley, Minnesota, during the Fourth Army maneuvers in 1940.

==== Domestic deployments ====
Special Troops, 35th Division

- 35th Signal Company for communications duty in conjunction with a coal miners' strike in Columbus, Kansas, 17 June-6 August 1935

35th Division Quartermaster Train Source:

- Elements for flood relief duty along the Republican River in south-central Nebraska, 1–4 June 1935
- Entire train for martial law in conjunction with a streetcar workers' strike in Omaha, Nebraska, 15–21 June 1935

69th Infantry Brigade

- Brigade headquarters for command and control in conjunction with a streetcar workers' strike in Omaha, 15–21 June 1935

70th Infantry Brigade Source:

- Headquarters company for riot control duty during a railroad workers' strike in Poplar Bluff, Missouri, July 1922
- Headquarters and headquarters company for riot control duty during a riot at the Missouri State Penitentiary in Jefferson City, 25–27 March 1930

110th Medical Regiment

- Elements for riot control duty during a workers' strike at a Nebraska City meat packing plant, January–February 1922
- Elements for martial law in conjunction with a streetcar workers' strike in Omaha, 15–21 June 1935
- Elements for flood relief duty along the Republican River in south-central Nebraska, 1–4 June 1935

130th Field Artillery Regiment Source:

- 1st Battalion for riot control duty during a coal miners' strike in Pittsburg, 14 December 1921 – 26 February 1922
- Several batteries for tornado relief duty in Hutchinson, 13–15 January 1923, and Horton, 18–19 June 1923
- 1st Battalion for flood relief duty in Hutchinson, July 1929

134th Infantry Regiment Source:

- Five companies for riot control duty during a workers' strike at a Nebraska City meat packing plant, January–February 1922
- Portion of one company for tornado relief duty at Hastings, Nebraska, 9–12 May 1930
- Two companies for riot control duty during a water rights dispute along the north fork of the Platte River in Scotts Bluff County, Nebraska, 28 August-3 September 1935
- Entire regiment, less band, for martial law in conjunction with a streetcar workers' strike in Omaha, 15–21 June 1935

137th Infantry Regiment Source:

- 1st and 3rd Battalions for riot control duty during a coal miners' strike in Pittsburg, Kansas, 14 December 1921 – 26 February 1922
- Tornado relief duty in Augusta, Kansas, 13–16 July 1924
- 2nd Battalion for road patrols and bridge blocks during a prison breakout in Lansing, Kansas, 19–20 January 1934
- Regimental headquarters and 3rd Battalion for riot control duty during a copper miners' disturbance in Baxter Springs, Kansas, 8–27 June 1934, and during a coal miners' strike in Columbus, Kansas, 17 June-6 August 1935

138th Infantry Regiment Source:

- 1st Battalion for riot control duty during a railroad workers' strike in Poplar Bluff, July 1922
- Tornado relief duty in St. Louis, Missouri, 29 September-6 October 1927

140th Infantry Regiment Source:

- Riot control duty at railroad workers' strikes in Moberly, Macon, and Poplar Bluff, Missouri, 13 July-23 November 1922, and during a workers' strike in New Madrid, Missouri, May 1923
- Flood relief duty along the Mississippi River at Charleston, Sikeston, and Poplar Bluff, Missouri, 16 April-12 May 1927 and January 1937, and along the St. Francis River, June 1928, and every spring from 1932 to 1933 and 1935–1938

142nd Field Artillery Regiment

- Entire regiment for flood relief duty in Forrest City, Camp Barton, and Jonesboro, Arkansas, January–February 1937

161st Field Artillery Regiment Source:

- Three batteries for road patrols and bridge blocks during a prison breakout in Lansing, 19–20 January 1934
- 2nd Battalion for riot control duty during a coal miners' strike in Columbus, Kansas, 17–25 June 1935
- 1st Battalion for riot control duty during a coal miners' strike in Columbus, Kansas, 28 June-6 August 1935

==== Commanders ====
- Major General Charles I. Martin (Kansas) - 7 June 1932–January 1935
- Brigadier General Amos Thomas (Nebraska) (interim) - January 1935–13 September 1935
- Major General Herbert J. Paul (Nebraska) - 13 September 1935 – 6 November 1937
- Major General Edward M. Stayton (Missouri) - 7 November 1937 – 2 September 1938
- Major General Ralph E. Truman (Missouri) - 28 October 1938 – 17 October 1941
- Major General William H. Simpson (Regular Army) - 17 October 1941–May 1942

==== Order of battle, 1924 ====
Italics indicates that the given unit was unorganized or inactive

- Headquarters, 35th Division
  - Division Headquarters Detachment
- Headquarters, Special Troops (Missouri National Guard)
  - Headquarters Detachment, Special Troops (Missouri National Guard)
  - Medical Department Detachment, Special Troops (Missouri National Guard)
  - Headquarters Company (Warrensburg, Missouri)
  - 35th Military Police Company (Kansas National Guard)
  - 35th Signal Company (Kansas City, Kansas)
  - 110th Ordnance Company (Medium) (Kansas National Guard)
  - 35th Tank Company (Light) (St. Joseph, Missouri)
  - Motorcycle Company No. 110 (Kansas National Guard)
- 69th Infantry Brigade (Topeka, Kansas)
  - 134th Infantry Regiment (Omaha, Nebraska)
  - 137th Infantry Regiment (Horton, Kansas)
- 70th Infantry Brigade (Jefferson City, Missouri)
  - 138th Infantry Regiment (St. Louis, Missouri)
  - 140th Infantry Regiment (Caruthersville, Missouri)
- 60th Field Artillery Brigade (Topeka, Kansas)
  - 130th Field Artillery Regiment (Topeka, Kansas)
  - 161st Field Artillery Regiment (Topeka, Kansas)
  - 110th Ammunition Train (Kansas National Guard)
- 110th Engineer Regiment (Kansas City, Missouri)
- 110th Medical Regiment (Lincoln, Nebraska)
- 35th Division Train, Quartermaster Corps (Lincoln, Nebraska)
- 35th Division Air Service (St. Louis, Missouri)

=== World War II ===
==== WWII division organization ====
===== Square division =====
On 23 December 1940, the 35th Division was inducted into federal service at home stations. The division's units were ordered to report to Camp Joseph T.Robinson in Arkansas and arrived there by the end of January 1941. The incomplete ranks of the 35th were swelled by thousands of draftees, a large portion of whom were from Kansas, Missouri, and Nebraska, through a War Department arrangement to fill the balance of National Guard units ordered into federal service with men from their home states or corps areas insofar as was possible. At the time the division still retained its World War I square organization and consisted of the following units.

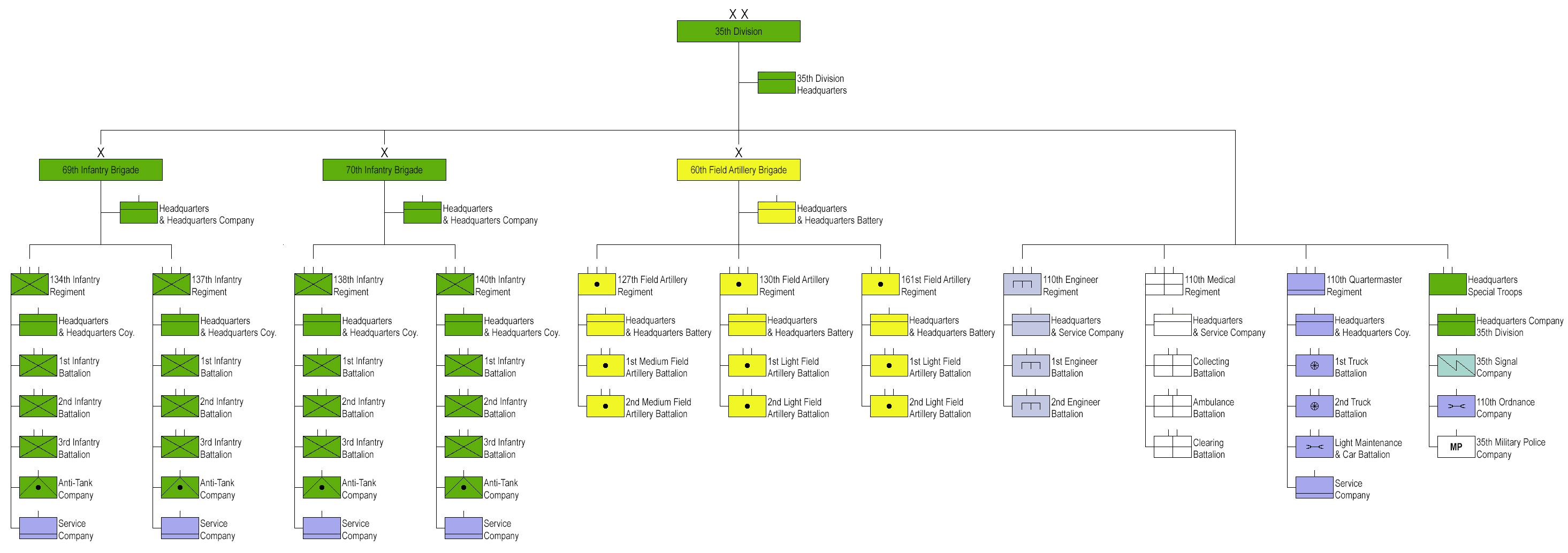
35th Division square organization (click to enlarge)

- 35th Division
  - 35th Division Headquarters, in Kansas City (MO)
    - 35th Division Headquarters Detachment, in Warrensburg (MO)
  - 69th Infantry Brigade, in Omaha (NE)
    - Headquarters and Headquarters Company, in Topeka (KS)
    - 134th Infantry Regiment, in Omaha (NE)
      - Headquarters and Headquarters Company
      - 3× Infantry battalions
        - each battalion consists of: 1× Headquarters and Headquarters Detachment, 3× Rifle companies, 1× Weapons Company
      - Anti-Tank Company (M3 37mm Anti-Tank guns)
      - Service Company
    - 137th Infantry Regiment, in Horton (KS)
      - same organization as 134th Infantry Regiment
  - 70th Infantry Brigade, in Jefferson City (MO)
    - Headquarters and Headquarters Company, in Jefferson City (MO)
    - 138th Infantry Regiment, in St. Louis (MO)
      - same organization as 134th Infantry Regiment
    - 140th Infantry Regiment, in Caruthersville (MO)
      - same organization as 134th Infantry Regiment
  - 60th Field Artillery Brigade, in Topeka (KS)
    - Headquarters and Headquarters Battery, in Topeka (KS)
    - 127th Field Artillery Regiment, in Topeka (KS) (assigned to the division on 1 October 1940)
      - Headquarters and Headquarters Battery
      - 2× Medium Field Artillery battalions
        - Headquarters and Headquarters Battery
        - 3× Howitzer batteries (M1918 155mm towed howitzers, replaced by M1 155mm towed howitzers in 1941)
        - Anti-Tank Battery (M1897 75mm anti-tank guns)
        - Service Battery
    - 130th Field Artillery Regiment, in Topeka (KS)
      - Headquarters and Headquarters Battery
      - 2× Light Field Artillery battalions
        - Headquarters and Headquarters Battery
        - 3× Howitzer batteries (M1897 75mm field guns), replaced by M2 105mm towed howitzers in 1941)
        - Service Battery
    - 142nd Field Artillery Regiment, in El Dorado (AR) (relieved from assignment to the division on 1 October 1940)
      - same organization as 127th Field Artillery Regiment
    - 161st Field Artillery Regiment, in Topeka (KS)
      - same organization as 130th Field Artillery Regiment
  - 110th Engineer Regiment, in Kansas City (MO)
    - Headquarters and Headquarters and Service Company
    - 2× Engineer battalions
      - each battalion consists of: 1× Headquarters, 3× Engineer companies
  - 110th Medical Regiment, in Lincoln (NE)
    - Headquarters and Headquarters and Service Company
    - Collecting Battalion
      - battalion consists of: 1× Headquarters, 3× Collecting companies
    - Ambulance Battalion
      - battalion consists of: 1× Headquarters, 3× Ambulance companies
    - Clearing Battalion
      - battalion consists of: 1× Headquarters, 3× Clearing companies
  - 110th Quartermaster Regiment, in Lincoln (NE)
    - Headquarters and Headquarters Company
    - 2× Truck battalions
      - each battalion consists of: 1× Headquarters, 2× Truck companies
    - Light Maintenance and Car Battalion
      - battalion consists of: 1× Headquarters, 1× Light Maintenance Company, 1× Car Company
    - Service Company
  - Headquarters, Special Troops, in St. Joseph (MO)
    - Headquarters Company, 35th Division, in Warrensburg (MO)
    - 35th Signal Company, in Kansas City (KS)
    - 110th Ordnance Company, in Kansas
    - 35th Military Police Company, in Garden City (KS)

===== Triangular division =====
On 1 March 1942, as a part of an Army-wide reorganization of National Guard divisions, the 35th Division was reorganized as a triangular division. The division's two brigade headquarters were disbanded in favor of a structure containing three separate regimental commands reporting directly to the division headquarters, as well as four field artillery battalions under a division artillery headquarters, with the engineer, medical, and quartermaster regiments also reduced to battalions. The 138th Infantry Regiment was reorganized as a separate regimental combat team and assigned to General Headquarters. With the reorganization the division was renamed 35th Infantry Division. Afterwards the 35th Infantry Division was composed of the following units:

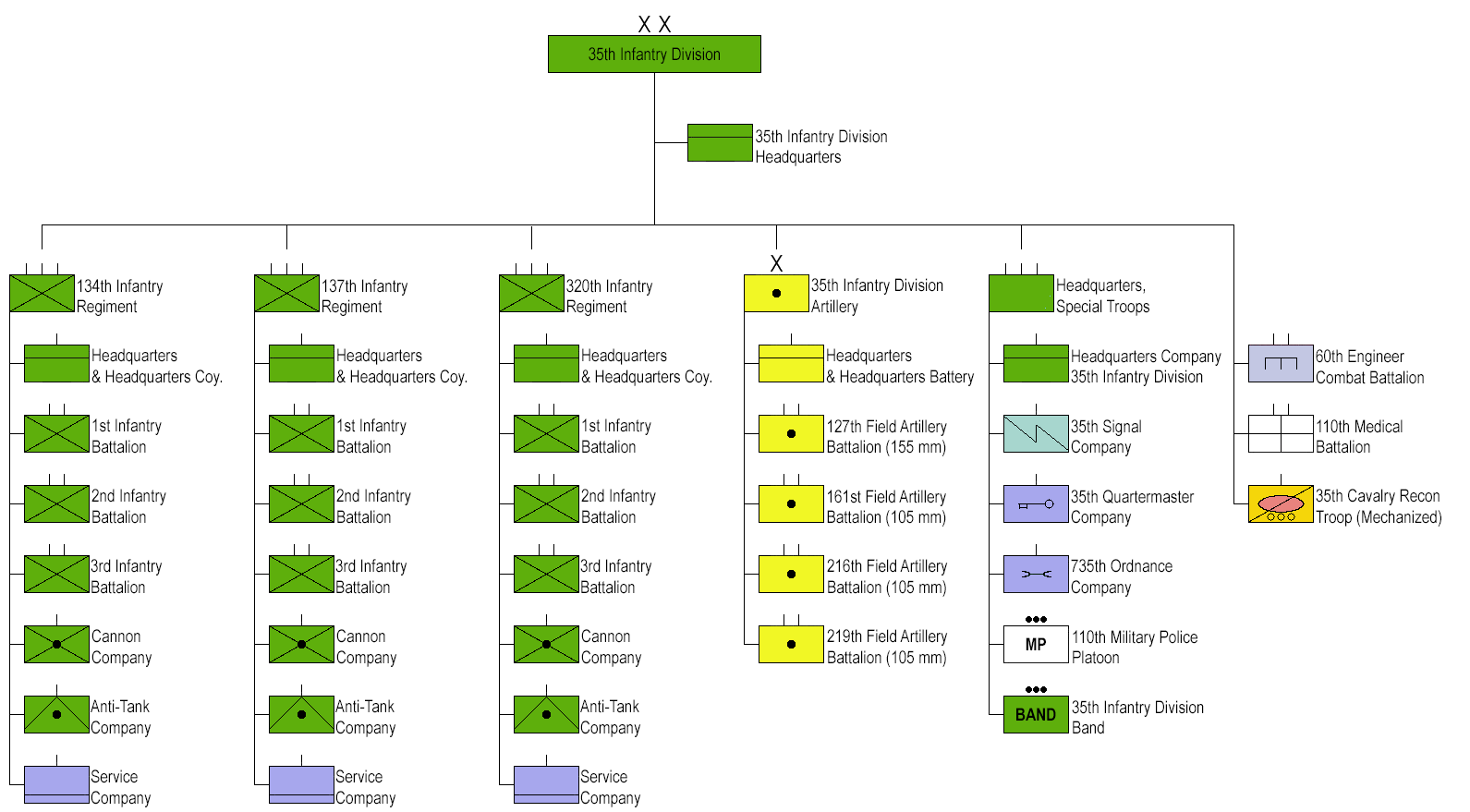
35th Infantry Division triangular organization (click to enlarge)

- 35th Infantry Division
  - 35th Infantry Division Headquarters
  - 35th Cavalry Reconnaissance Troop (Mechanized) (M3 scout cars and then M8 Greyhound armored cars)
  - 134th Infantry Regiment
    - Headquarters and Headquarters Company
    - 3× Infantry battalions
      - each battalion consists of: 1× Headquarters and Headquarters Company, 3× Rifle companies, 1× Heavy Weapons Company
    - Cannon Company (T12 Gun Motor Carriages and T19 Howitzer Motor Carriages, later replaced by either M3 105mm towed howitzers or M7 Priest self propelled howitzers)
    - Anti-Tank Company (M3 37mm anti-tank guns, which were replaced by 1944 with M1 57mm anti-tank guns)
    - Service Company
  - 137th Infantry Regiment
    - same organization as 134th Infantry Regiment
  - 140th Infantry Regiment (relieved from assignment to the division on 27 January 1943)
    - same organization as 134th Infantry Regiment
  - 320th Infantry Regiment (assigned to the division on 27 January 1943)
    - same organization as 134th Infantry Regiment
  - 35th Infantry Division Artillery
    - Headquarters and Headquarters Battery
    - 127th Field Artillery Battalion
      - Headquarters and Headquarters Battery
      - 3× Batteries (M1 155mm towed howitzers)
      - Service Battery
    - 161st Field Artillery Battalion
      - Headquarters and Headquarters Battery
      - 3× Batteries (M2 105mm towed howitzers)
      - Service Battery
    - 216th Field Artillery Battalion
      - same organization as 161st Field Artillery Battalion
    - 219th Field Artillery Battalion
      - same organization as 161st Field Artillery Battalion
  - Headquarters Special Troops
    - Headquarters Company, 35th Infantry Division
    - 35th Signal Company
    - 35th Quartermaster Company
    - 735th Ordnance Light Maintenance Company
    - 110th Military Police Platoon
    - 35th Infantry Division Band (attached)
  - 35th Quartermaster Battalion (Between September and November 1942 Quartermaster battalions were disbanded and their platoons used to form a Quartermaster Company and an Ordnance Company, which were both assigned to Headquarters Special Troops)
    - Headquarters and Headquarters Company (includes a service platoon and a maintenance platoon)
    - Truck Company
  - 60th Engineer Combat Battalion
    - Headquarters and Headquarters and Service Company
    - 3× Engineer combat companies
  - 110th Medical Battalion
    - Headquarters and Headquarters Detachment
    - 3× Collecting companies
    - Clearing Company

The division departed California for Camp Rucker, Alabama, arriving on 1 April 1943. After participating in the Second Army Tennessee Maneuvers from 22 November 1943 to 17 January 1944 and receiving mountain warfare training at the West Virginia Maneuver Area from 21 February to 28 March 1944, the 35th Infantry Division was declared ready for overseas service. Further movement to Camp Butner, North Carolina, and Camp Kilmer, New Jersey, saw the division through to England, where it arrived on 25 May 1944.

==== World War II combat chronicle ====
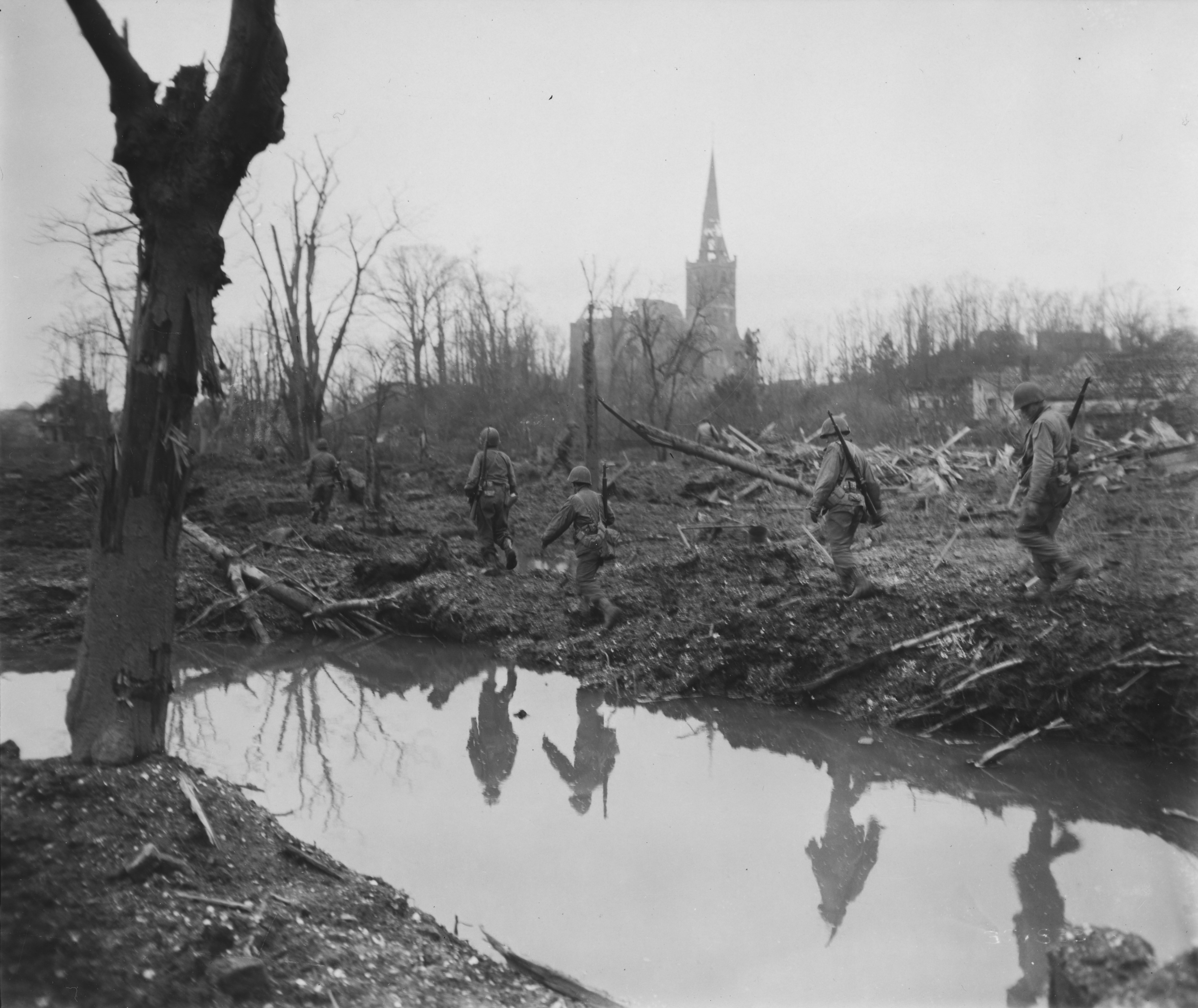
Men of 1st Battalion, 137th Regiment, 35th Division move towards Unterbruch. 6 February 1945.

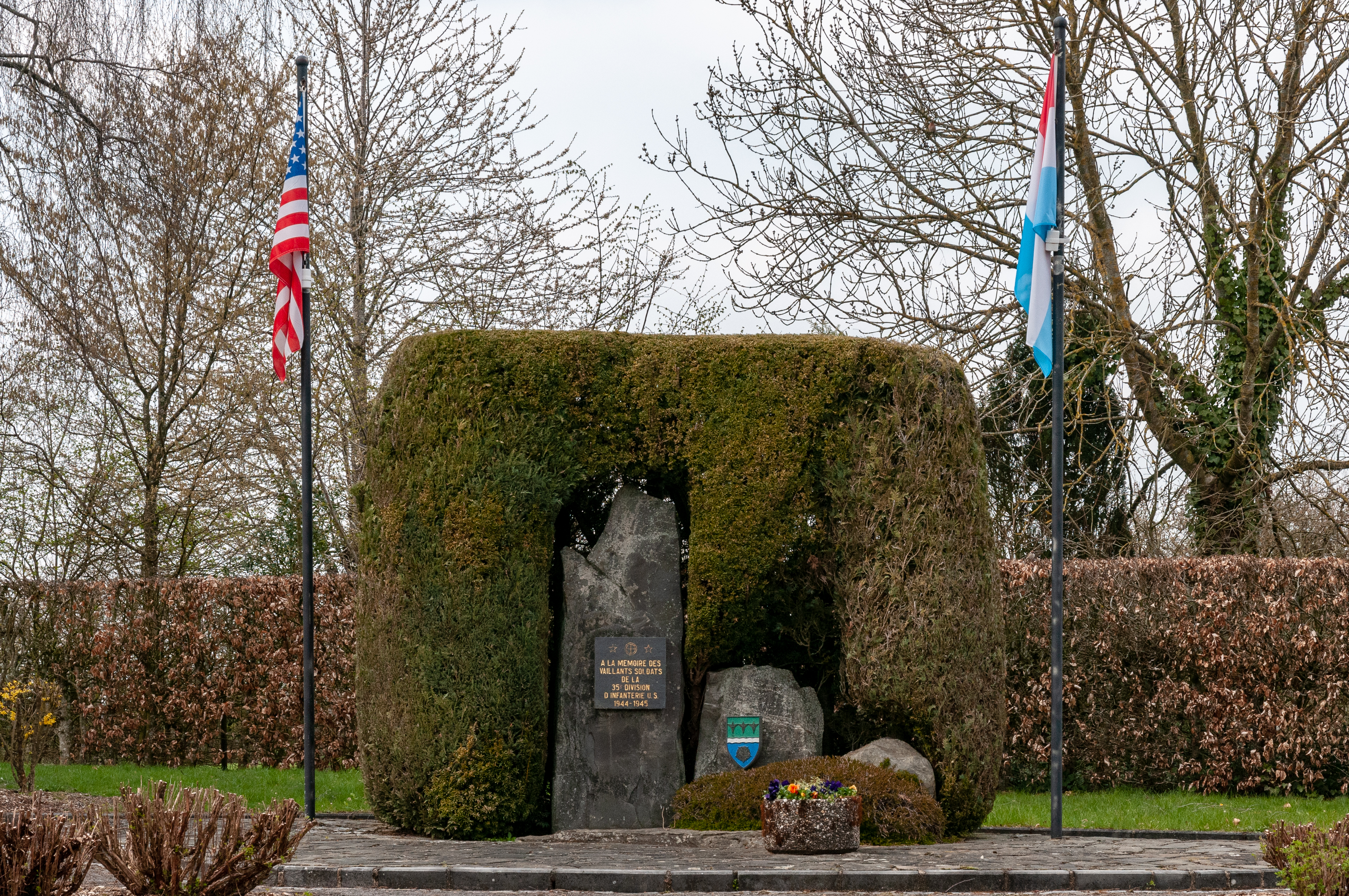
Battle of the Bulge-Memorial in Boulaide: À la mémoire des vaillants soldats de la 35e division d'infanterie U.S. 1944–1945.

The 35th Infantry Division arrived in England on 25 May 1944 and received further training. It landed on Omaha Beach, Normandy 5–7 July 1944 and entered combat on 11 July, fighting in the Normandy hedgerows north of St. Lo. The division turned away twelve German counterattacks at Emelie before entering St. Lo on 18 July. After mopping up in the St. Lo area, it took part in the offensive action southwest of St. Lo, pushing the Germans across the Vire River on 2 August, and breaking out of the Cotentin Peninsula. While en route to an assembly area, the division was "flagged off the road," to secure the Mortain-Avranches corridor and to rescue the 30th Division's "Lost Battalion" August 7–13, 1944.

Then racing across France through Orleans and Sens, the division attacked across the Moselle on 13 September, captured Nancy on 15 September, secured Chambrey on 1 October, and drove on to the German border, taking Sarreguemines and crossing the Saar on 8 December. After crossing the Blies River on 12 December, the division moved to Metz for rest and rehabilitation on 19 December. The 35th moved to Arlon, Belgium December 25–26, and took part in the fighting to relieve Bastogne, throwing off the attacks of four German divisions, taking Villers-la Bonne-Eau on 10 January, after a 13-day fight and Lutrebois in a 5-day engagement. On 18 January 1945, the division returned to Metz to resume its interrupted rest.

In late January, the division was defending the Foret de Domaniale area. Moving to the Netherlands to hold a defensive line along the Roer on 22 February, the division attacked across the Roer on 23 February, pierced the Siegfried Line, reached the Rhine at Wesel on 10 March, and crossed 25–26 March. It smashed across the Herne Canal and reached the Ruhr River early in April, when it was ordered to move to the Elbe April 12. Making the 295-mile dash in two days, the 35th mopped up in the vicinity of Colbitz and Angern, until 26 April 1945 when it moved to Hanover for occupational and mopping-up duty, continuing occupation beyond VE-day. The division left Southampton, England, on 5 September, and arrived in New York City on 10 September 1945.

==== Statistics ====
- Campaigns: Normandy, Northern France, Rhineland, Ardennes-Alsace, Central Europe
- Days of combat: 264

==== Commanders ====
- Major General Ralph E. Truman (October 1938 – October 1941)
- Major General William H. Simpson (October 1941 – April 1942)
- Major General Maxwell Murray (May 1942 – January 1943)
- Major General Paul W. Baade (January 1943 to inactivation)

==== Assignments in the ETO ====
- 5 May 1944: XV Corps, Third Army.
- 8 July 1944: Third Army, but attached to the XIX Corps of First Army.
- 27 July 1944: V Corps.
- 1 August 1944: Third Army, Twelfth United States Army Group, but attached to the V Corps of First Army.
- 5 August 1944: Third Army, 12th Army Group.
- 6 August 1944: XX Corps.
- 9 August 1944: Third Army, 12th Army Group, but attached to the VII Corps of First Army.
- 13 August 1944: XII Corps, Third Army, 12th Army Group.
- 23 December 1944: Third Army, 12th Army Group.
- 24 December 1944: XX Corps.
- 26 December 1944: III Corps.
- 18 January 1945: XX Corps.
- 23 January 1945: XV Corps, Sixth United States Army Group.
- 30 January 1945: XVI Corps, Ninth Army, attached to the British 21st Army Group, 12th Army Group.
- 4 April 1945: XVI Corps, Ninth Army, 12th Army Group.
- 13 April 1945: XIX Corps for operations, and the XIII Corps for administration.
- 16 April 1945: XIII Corps.

==== Decorations ====
- Unit Awards:
  - Distinguished Unit Citations: 7
    - 134th Infantry Regiment, for extraordinary heroism in connection with military operations against the enemy during the period 28 December 1944 through 16 January 1945 (War Department General Orders No. 62, 1947)
    - 1st Battalion, 134th Infantry Regiment, for extraordinary heroism and outstanding performance of duty against the enemy in the vicinity of Saint-Lô, Normandy, France, from 15 to 19 July 1944 (War Department General Orders No. 66, 1945)
    - Company C, 134th Infantry Regiment, for extraordinary heroism and outstanding performance of duty against the enemy in the vicinity of Habkirchen, Germany, from 12 to 21 December 1944 (War Department General Orders No. 68, 1945)
    - 2nd (machine gun) Platoon, Company D, 134th Infantry Regiment, for extraordinary heroism in action against the enemy in the vicinity of Habkirchen, Germany, from 12 to 21 December 1944 (War Department General Orders No. 66, 1945)
    - Company F, 137th Infantry Regiment, for outstanding performance of duty in action against the enemy at Sarreguemines, France, on 10 December 1944 (War Department General Orders No. 11, 1946)
    - 3rd Battalion, 137th Infantry Regiment, for outstanding performance of duty in action against the enemy in France, 18–21 November 1944 (War Department General Orders No. 20, 1946)
    - 1st Battalion, 320th Infantry Regiment, for extraordinary heroism and outstanding performance of duty in action against the enemy in the vicinity of Mortain, France, from 10 to 13 August 1944 (War Department General Orders No. 55, 1945)
  - Meritorious Service Unit Plaques: 22
- Individual Awards:
  - Medal of Honor: 1 (Staff Sergeant Junior J. Spurrier)
  - Distinguished Service Cross: 44
  - Distinguished Service Medal: 1
  - Silver Star Medal: 688
  - Legion of Merit: 10
  - Distinguished Flying Cross: 1
  - Soldier's Medal: 22
  - Bronze Star Medal: 3,435
  - Air Medal: 133

==== Casualties ====
- Total battle casualties: 15,822
- Killed in action: 2,485
- Wounded in action: 11,526
- Missing in action: 340
- Prisoner of war: 1,471

=== Cold War to present ===
On 7 December 1945, the division was inactivated at Camp Breckinridge, Kentucky. During the next year and into 1947, the division was reestablished as a Kansas and Missouri National Guard division. In 1954 the division consisted of the 137th (Kansas), 138th (Missouri), and 140th Infantry Regiments (Missouri); 127th, 128th, 129th, and 154th Field Artillery Battalions; the 135th Antiaircraft Artillery Battalion; the 135th Tank Battalion; and signals, engineer, reconnaissance, military police, other combat support units, plus combat service support units. After the Pentomic reorganization, the division's five battle groups were the 1-137 Infantry; 2-137 Infantry; 1-138 Infantry; 2-138 Infantry; and 1-140 Infantry. In 1963, the division was inactivated along with the 34th, 43rd, and 51st Infantry Divisions.

In early 1983, the Army began the process of reestablishing the division as a mechanized infantry formation to be made up of Colorado, Kansas, Kentucky, Missouri, and Nebraska National Guard units. The division headquarters was established 30 September 1983, at Fort Leavenworth. The division was formally reactivated as the 35th Infantry Division (Mechanized) on 25 August 1984 around a nucleus of the 67th Infantry Brigade (Mechanized) from Nebraska, the 69th Infantry Brigade (Mechanized) from Kansas, and the 149th Armored Brigade from Kentucky. It continues in service today.

In 1984–85, the 69th Infantry Brigade was reported to consist of the following units:

- 1st Battalion, 137th Infantry
- 2nd Battalion, 137th Infantry
- 1st Battalion, 635th Armor
- 1st Battalion, 127th Field Artillery
- Troop E, 114th Cavalry
- 169th Engineer Company.

Isby and Kamps also wrote at the same time that the 110th Engineer Battalion, in Missouri, might be assigned as the divisional engineers (p383); however, this did not occur. Actually, the divisional engineer battalion, the 206th Engineer Battalion, was organized in the Kentucky Army National Guard on 1 November 1985.

The division aviation brigade headquarters was organized in the Kentucky Army National Guard on 15 September 1986. On 1 October 1987 the division's aviation units were reorganized, and the 135th Aviation was established. Two battalions of the 135th joined the division's aviation component.

==== Order of battle 1990 ====
Order of battle - 1 October 1990

- 35th Infantry Division (Mechanized)
  - 67th Infantry Brigade (Mechanized) (Nebraska Army National Guard)
    - 1st Battalion, 134th Infantry Regiment (Mechanized) (M113)
    - 2nd Battalion, 134th Infantry Regiment (Mechanized) (M113)
    - 1st Battalion, 195th Armor Regiment (M60A1)
  - 69th Infantry Brigade(Mechanized) (Kansas Army National Guard)
    - 1st Battalion, 137th Infantry Regiment (Mechanized) (M113) (Kansas Army National Guard)
    - 2nd Battalion, 137th Infantry Regiment (Mechanized) (M113) (Kansas Army National Guard)
    - 1st Battalion, 635th Armor (M60A1)
    - 2nd Battalion, 635th Armor (M60A1)
  - 149th Armored Brigade (Kentucky Army National Guard)
    - 1st Battalion, 123rd Armor (M60A3)
    - 2nd Battalion, 123rd Armor (M60A3)
    - 1st Battalion, 149th Infantry (Mechanized) (M113)
  - 35th Infantry Division Artillery (Kansas Army National Guard)
    - 1st Battalion, 127th Field Artillery Regiment (Kansas Army National Guard) (155SP)
    - 1st Battalion, 168th Field Artillery Regiment (Nebraska Army National Guard) (155SP)
    - 1st Battalion, 161st Field Artillery Regiment (Kansas Army National Guard) (8in SP)
    - Battery E, 161st Field Artillery Regiment (Kansas Army National Guard) (Target Acquisition)
    - 2nd Battalion, 138th Field Artillery Regiment (Kentucky Army National Guard) (155SP)
  - 35th Combat Aviation Brigade (Kentucky Army National Guard)
    - 1st Squadron, 167th Cavalry Regiment (M60A1/M113) (Nebraska Army National Guard)
    - 1st Battalion, 135th Aviation Regiment (Attack) (Missouri Army National Guard) (AH-1)
    - 2nd Battalion, 135th Aviation Regiment (Attack) (Colorado Army National Guard) (AH-1)
    - Company D, 135th Aviation Regiment (Command/GS) (Kansas Army National Guard) (UH-1)
    - Company E, 135th Aviation Regiment (Assault) (Kentucky Army National Guard) (UH-60)
  - 35th Infantry Division Support Command (Missouri Army National Guard)
    - 735th Support Battalion (Main) (Missouri Army National Guard)
    - 67th Support Battalion (Fwd) (1x2)(Nebraska Army National Guard)
    - 103rd Support Battalion (Fwd) (2x1)(Kentucky Army National Guard)
    - 169th Support Battalion (Fwd) (2x2)(Kansas Army National Guard)
    - Company F, 135th Aviation Regiment (Maint) (Kentucky Army National Guard)
  - 35th Infantry Division Troops
    - 135th Signal Battalion (Missouri Army National Guard)
    - 206th Engineer Battalion (Ribbon) (Kentucky Army National Guard)
    - 135th MI Battalion (CEWI) (United States Army Reserve) (HQ & HHC, A Company Olathe, Kansas)(B Co, C Co Omaha, NE)
    - Long-range Surveillance Detachment (LRSD) (Nebraska Army National Guard) directly attached to C Co 135th MI BN in wartime
    - 35th MP Company(Kansas Army National Guard)
    - 35th ID Band (Kansas Army National Guard)
    - 141st Chemical Company (Kentucky Army National Guard)

Headquarters and Headquarters Company, Aviation Brigade, 35th Infantry Division was reorganized and redesignated 1 September 1995 as Headquarters and Headquarters Company 63rd Aviation Group, and relieved from assignment to the 35th Infantry Division.

==== Order of battle 1996 ====
Order of battle - 1 September 1996

- 35th Infantry Division
  - 66th Infantry Brigade (Light) (Illinois Army National Guard)
    - 1st Battalion, 123rd Infantry Regiment (Light)
    - 2nd Battalion, 130th Infantry Regiment (Light)
    - 1st Battalion, 131st Infantry Regiment (United States) (Light)
  - 67th Infantry Brigade (Mechanized) (Nebraska Army National Guard)
    - 1st Battalion, 134th Infantry Regiment (Mechanized) (M113A3)
    - 1st Battalion, 195th Armor Regiment (M1)
    - 2nd Battalion, 137th Infantry Regiment (Mechanized) (M113A3) (Kansas Army National Guard)
  - 149th Armored Brigade (Kentucky Army National Guard)
    - 1st Battalion, 123rd Armor (M1)
    - 2nd Battalion, 123rd Armor (M1)
    - 1st Battalion, 149th Infantry (Mechanized) (M113A3)
  - 35th Infantry Division Artillery (Kansas Army National Guard)
    - 2nd Battalion, 122nd Field Artillery Regiment (Illinois Army National Guard)
    - 1st Battalion, 161st Field Artillery Regiment (Kansas Army National Guard)
    - 2nd Battalion, 138th Field Artillery Regiment (Kentucky Army National Guard)
    - Battery F, 161st Field Artillery Regiment (Kansas Army National Guard)
    - Battery E, 161st Field Artillery Regiment (Kansas Army National Guard)
  - 35th Combat Aviation Brigade (Missouri Army National Guard)
    - 1st Squadron, 167th Cavalry Regiment (AH-1/M113) (Nebraska Army National Guard)
    - 1st Battalion, 135th Aviation Regiment (Attack) (AH-1) (Missouri Army National Guard)
    - 1st Battalion, 114th Aviation Regiment (Assault) (UH-1)(Arkansas Army National Guard)
  - 35th Infantry Division Support Command
    - 634th Forward Support Battalion (Illinois Army National Guard)
    - 67th Forward Support Battalion (Nebraska Army National Guard)
    - 103rd Forward Support Battalion (Kentucky Army National Guard)
    - 735th Main Support Battalion (Missouri Army National Guard)
    - Company F, 135th Aviation Regiment (Kentucky Army National Guard
  - 35th Infantry Division Troops
    - Company D, 134th Infantry Regiment (LRS) (Nebraska National Guard)
    - 2-202nd Air Defense Artillery Battalion (Illinois Army National Guard)
    - 635th Military Intelligence Battalion (Missouri Army National Guard)
    - 35th Military Police Company (Kansas Army National Guard)
    - 135th Signal Battalion (Missouri Army National Guard)
    - 35th DROC (Missouri Army National Guard)
    - 35th Infantry Division Band (Kansas Army National Guard)
  - 135th Engineer Brigade (Missouri Army National Guard)
    - 206th Engineer Battalion (Missouri Army National Guard)
    - 135th Engineer Company (Illinois Army National Guard)

The 635th Aviation Group of the Missouri Army National Guard was inactivated on 8 August 1993 at Jefferson City Army Aviation Support Facility. On 24 March 1997, the unit was reorganized and federally recognized as HHC, Aviation Brigade, 35th Infantry Division in Warrensburg, Missouri.

==== Bosnia ====
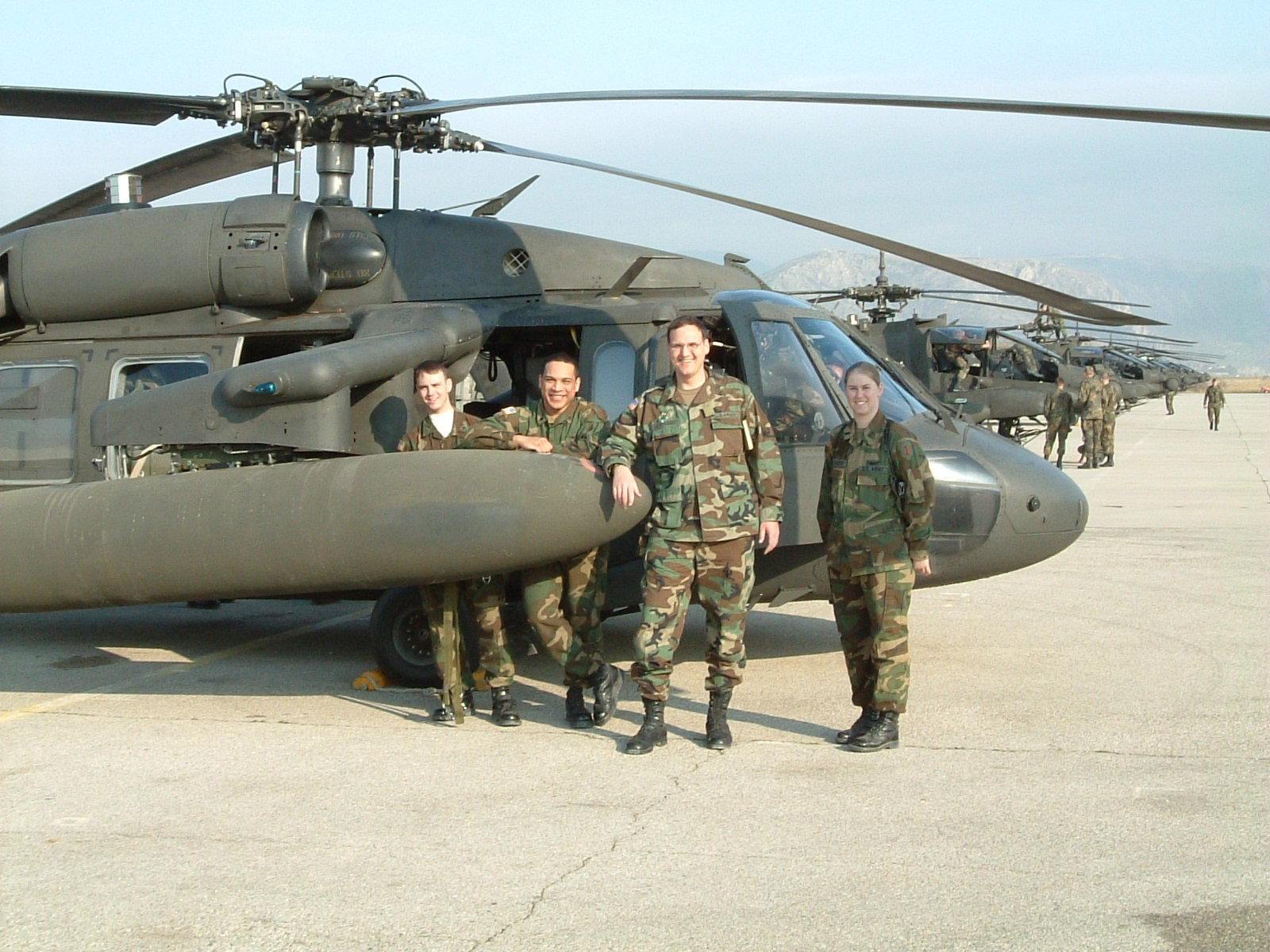
35th ID Liaison Officer, Mostar, Bosnia, April 5, 2003

The 35th Infantry Division Headquarters commanded Task Force Eagle's Multi-National Division North in Bosnia and Herzegovina as part of SFOR-13 (Stabilization Force 13) with the NATO peacekeeping mandate under the Dayton Peace Accords. The headquarters were located at Eagle Base in the town of Tuzla. Brigadier General James Mason was the commander. He later went on to command the division. The division headquarters received the Army Superior Unit Award for its service in Bosnia. Division liaison officers served in the towns of Mostar, Sarajevo, Banja Luka, Zenica and Doboj.

==== Hurricane Katrina ====
The division provided headquarters control for National Guard units deployed to Louisiana in the aftermath of Hurricane Katrina. while the 38th Infantry Division did the same for Mississippi.

==== Kosovo ====
A detachment of the 35th Infantry Division was the headquarters element for Task Force Falcon of Multi-National Task Force East (MNTF-E) for the NATO Kosovo Force 9 (KFOR 9) mission. The 35th provided command and control from 7 November 2007 until 7 July 2008, when they were succeeded by the 110th Maneuver Enhancement Brigade, Missouri Army National Guard.

==== Global War on Terror ====
The 35th Infantry Division has deployed as a division headquarters to the United States Central Command (CENTCOM) area of operations in support of both Operation Spartan Shield and Operation Inherent Resolve. While deployed, the division assumed theater command responsibilities under the title Task Force Spartan, directing coalition and U.S. Army operations across the region.

The division’s first headquarters deployment took place from July 2017 to March 2018, when it assumed command from the 29th Infantry Division and later transferred authority to the 28th Infantry Division. The 35th Infantry Division deployed a second time from March to November 2022, again leading Task Force Spartan before relinquishing command to the 28th Infantry Division.

== Division organization in 2026 ==
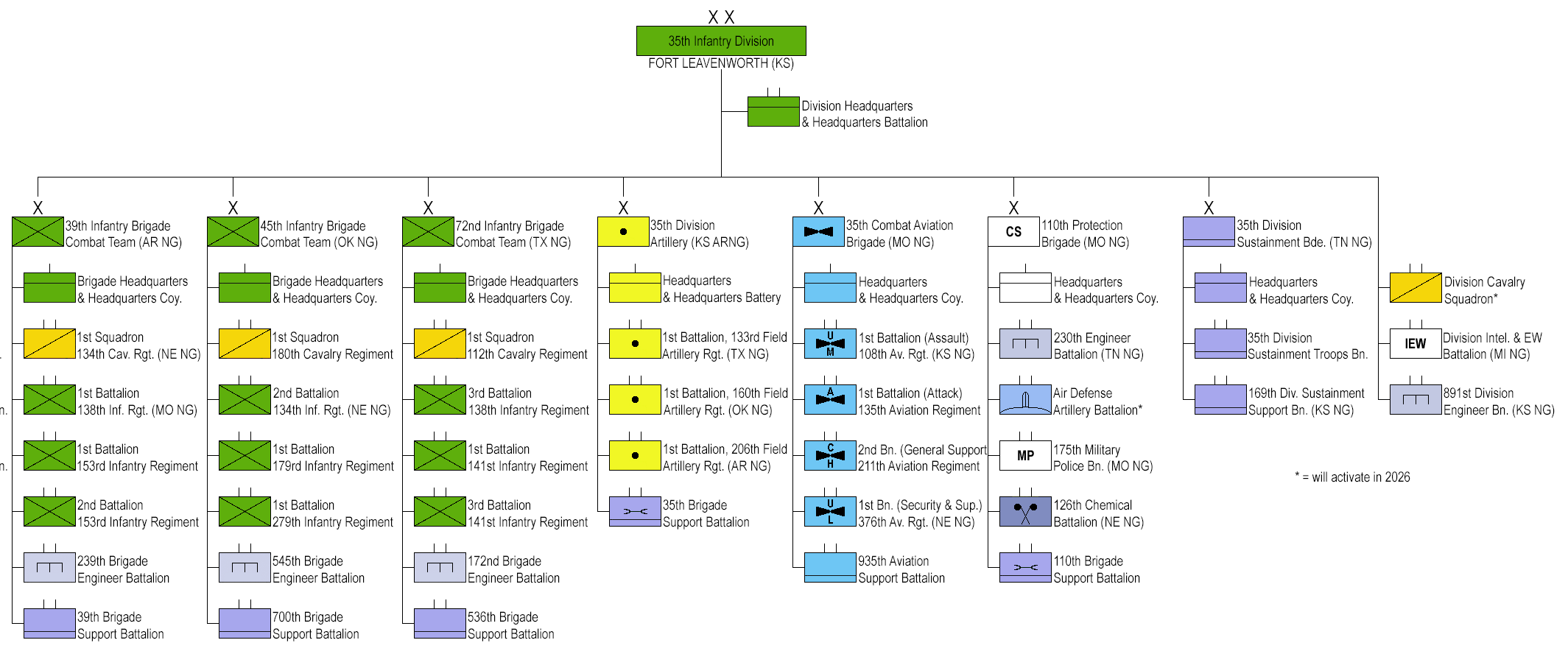
35th Infantry Division organization February 2026 (click to enlarge)

As of 2023, the 35th Infantry Division consists of a special troops battalion, three infantry brigade combat teams, a division artillery, a combat aviation brigade, a maneuver enhancement brigade, and division sustainment brigade. The 35th Infantry Division is in the process of adding several new units and becoming a "light division" as the U.S. Army shifts from the brigade combat team to the division as the major formation as part of its force structure modification plan for the early 21st century.

- 35th Infantry Division
  - Special Troops Battalion
  - 39th Mobile Brigade Combat Team (Arkansas Army National Guard)
    - Headquarters and Headquarters Company
    - 1st Squadron, 134th Cavalry Regiment (Nebraska Army National Guard)
    - 1st Battalion, 138th Infantry Regiment (Missouri Army National Guard)
    - 1st Battalion, 153rd Infantry Regiment
    - 2nd Battalion, 153rd Infantry Regiment
    - 239th Brigade Engineer Battalion
    - 39th Brigade Support Battalion
  - 45th Infantry Brigade Combat Team (Oklahoma Army National Guard)
    - Headquarters and Headquarters Company
    - 1st Squadron, 180th Cavalry Regiment
    - 2nd Battalion, 134th Infantry Regiment (Airborne) (Nebraska Army National Guard)
    - 1st Battalion, 179th Infantry Regiment
    - 1st Battalion, 279th Infantry Regiment
    - 545th Brigade Engineer Battalion
    - 700th Brigade Support Battalion
  - 72nd Infantry Brigade Combat Team (Texas Army National Guard)
    - Headquarters and Headquarters Company
    - 1st Squadron, 112th Cavalry Regiment
    - 1st Battalion, 141st Infantry Regiment
    - 3rd Battalion, 141st Infantry Regiment
    - 3rd Battalion, 138th Infantry Regiment (Missouri Army National Guard)
    - 172nd Brigade Engineer Battalion
    - 536th Brigade Support Battalion
  - 35th Division Artillery (Kansas Army National Guard)
    - Headquarters and Headquarters Battery
    - 1st Battalion, 133rd Field Artillery Regiment (Texas Army National Guard)
    - 1st Battalion, 160th Field Artillery Regiment (Oklahoma Army National Guard)
    - 1st Battalion, 206th Field Artillery Regiment (Arkansas Army National Guard)
  - 35th Combat Aviation Brigade (Missouri Army National Guard)
    - Headquarters and Headquarters Company
    - 1st Battalion, 108th Aviation Regiment (Kansas Army National Guard)
    - 1st Battalion, 135th Aviation Regiment
    - 2nd Battalion, 211th Aviation Regiment (Utah Army National Guard)
    - 1st Battalion, 376th Aviation Regiment (Nebraska Army National Guard)
    - 935th Aviation Support Battalion
  - 35th Division Sustainment Brigade (Tennessee Army National Guard)
    - 169th Division Sustainment Support Battalion (Kansas Army National Guard)
  - 110th Maneuver Enhancement Brigade (Missouri Army National Guard) (intended final organization; will be reflagged as the 110th Protection Brigade in 2026)
    - Headquarters and Headquarters Company
    - Air Defense Artillery Battalion (will activate in 2026)
    - 126th Chemical Battalion (Nebraska Army National Guard)
    - 175th Military Police Battalion (Missouri Army National Guard)
    - 230th Engineer Battalion (Tennessee Army National Guard)
    - 110th Brigade Support Battalion
  - 891st Division Engineer Battalion (Kansas Army National Guard)
  - Division Intelligence & Electronic Warfare Battalion (Michigan Army National Guard)
  - Division Cavalry Squadron (will activate in 2026)
  - Division Mobile Protected Firepower Battalion (will activate in 2025)

== Heraldry and insignia ==
=== Distinctive unit insignia ===
The distinctive unit insignia of the 35th Infantry Division consists of an infantry blue nonagon with a gold border, on which is superimposed a gold covered wagon or "prairie schooner" drawn by four oxen. The insignia was originally approved on 27 August 1934, after the first division commander and the division staff had been appointed. The nonagon in infantry blue indicates that the 35th is an infantry division, and at the time was composed of nine complete regiments, while the wagon drawn by the oxen denotes the Midwestern heritage of the unit. The description of the insignia was amended on 29 February 1984 to change the color of the schooner from gold to silver. On 6 April 1984, it was authorized for the 35th Infantry Division and amended again to change the color of the schooner back to gold.

=== Shoulder sleeve insignia ===
The division's shoulder patch, a Santa Fe cross in a circle, was conceived as a marking for division vehicles and baggage in 1918, and was first promulgated by 35th Division General Orders Number 25, issued on 27 March 1918. It was officially approved for the 35th Division on 29 October 1918 by the adjutant general of the American Expeditionary Force. The marking was later stenciled onto signs identifying the whereabouts of division units, soldiers' helmets, and finally was made into a shoulder sleeve insignia when that usage was authorized.

The cross hair was a symbol used to mark the Santa Fe Trail, an area where the unit trained, and was designated as an identifying device for the unit by Headquarters, 35th Division General Orders 25, dated March 27, 1918. The organization is referred to as the Santa Fe Division.

Twenty-four distinct combinations of quadrant and border colors were devised for all of the 35th Division's units. Each major unit of the 35th Division (the division headquarters and headquarters troop and the 128th Machine Gun Battalion, the 110th Field Signal Battalion, 110th Ammunition, 110th Sanitary, and 110th Supply Trains, the 110th Engineer Regiment and Train, the 69th Infantry Brigade, the 70th Infantry Brigade, and the 60th Field Artillery Brigade) was respectively identified by one of six border colors: blue, green, white, yellow, black, or red. The component units each had their own combination of quadrant colors, consisting of one or two of the aforementioned. Patches varied widely in exact design and material.

Approved 35th Division insignia colors, General Order No. 25, 27 March 1918
Unit	Quadrant colors	Border color
Headquarters, 35th Division	4/4 blue	Blue
69th Infantry Brigade	4/4 yellow	Yellow
137th Infantry Regiment	3/4 yellow, 1/4 blue	Yellow
138th Infantry Regiment	2/4 yellow, 2/4 blue	Yellow
129th Machine Gun Battalion	2/4 red, 2/4 yellow	Yellow
70th Infantry Brigade	4/4 black	Black
139th Infantry Regiment	3/4 black, 1/4 yellow	Black
140th Infantry Regiment	2/4 black, 2/4 yellow	Black
130th Machine Gun Battalion	2/4 black, 2/4 yellow	Black
60th Field Artillery Brigade	4/4 red	Red
128th Field Artillery Regiment	3/4 red, 1/4 blue	Red
129th Field Artillery Regiment	3/4 red, 1/4 yellow	Red
130th Field Artillery Regiment	3/4 red, 1/4 white	Red
110th Trench Mortar Battery	3/4 red, 1/4 green	Red
128th Machine Gun Battalion	3/4 blue, 1/4 green	Blue
110th Engineer Regiment	4/4 white	White
110th Field Signal Battalion	4/4 green	Green
Headquarters Troop, 35th Division	3/4 blue, 1/4 yellow	Blue
110th Train Headquarters and Military Police	4/4 maroon	Green
110th Ammunition Train	3/4 maroon, 1/4 white	Green
110th Supply Train	3/4 maroon, 1/4 yellow	Green
110th Engineer Train	3/4 white, 1/4 red	White
110th Sanitary Train	3/4 maroon, 1/4 green	Green

Postwar, the wide variety of color combinations was done away with, and the insignia to be worn by all division personnel was simplified to consist of a white Santa Fe cross on a blue background with an olive drab border, although colored insignia continued in limited use in certain cases until the 1930s.

Within a blue circle 2 inches in diameter, 1/2-inch in width quadrated at 45 degrees to the lines of disk, a blue quadrated disk 1 1/8 inches in diameter, the inner ends of the quadrants rounded by arcs of 1/8-inch radius, all white lines 1/8-inch in width.

== Notable members ==
- Captain Harry S. Truman, Senator, Vice President, and President of the United States; commanded Battery D, 129th Field Artillery, 60th Field Artillery Brigade in WWI
- Brigadier General Harry H. Vaughan, military aide to Harry S. Truman during and after WWII
- Lieutenant Colonel Bill Hardwick, Missouri State Representative and Attorney; Battalion Commander, 35th ID.
- Captain Alexander R. Skinker, Missouri
  - Medal of Honor, WWI, Meuse-Argonne Offensive, 138th Infantry Regiment
- Private Nels Wold, Minnesota
  - Medal of Honor, WWI, Meuse-Argonne Offensive, 138th Infantry Regiment
- Second Lieutenant Erwin R. Bleckley, Kansas
  - Medal of Honor, WWI, Meuse-Argonne Offensive, 130th Field Artillery Regiment
- Staff Sergeant Junior J. Spurrier, Virginia
  - Medal of Honor, WWII, 134th Infantry Regiment
  - Distinguished Service Cross, WWII, 134th Infantry Regiment
- Master Sergeant Robert Pirosh, screenwriter, served during WWII

== In popular culture ==
- The 35th Infantry Division is featured in the 1970 film Kelly's Heroes. The blue and white division patch is worn throughout the movie and LTC Booker tells the General "elements of the 35th" when asked who has advanced.
- Mickey Rooney as Andy Hardy in 1947 film "Love Laughs at Andy Hardy " wears the 35th Infantry Division patch.
- The fictional unit in the film From Here to Eternity wears the 35th ID patch.
- This division is featured as a playable division in the 2024 RTS game Warno as part of the Early Access Pack DLC

== See also ==
- Meuse-Argonne order of battle
- Normandy order of battle
- Rhineland order of battle
- Ardennes-Alsace order of battle
- Clair Kenamore, military historian
