= 130th Field Artillery Regiment =

- Coat of arms
- Active: 1917–present
- Country: United States
- Branch: Army
- Type: Field artillery (Parent regiment under United States Army Regimental System)
- Part of: 130th Field Artillery Brigade (2nd Battalion)
- Home station: Hiawatha, Kansas (2nd Battalion)
- Motto(s): Semper Parvo Meliores (Always a Little Better)
- Engagements: World War I; World War II; Vietnam War; Operation Iraqi Freedom; Operation Inherent Resolve; Operation Enduring Freedom
- Decorations: Meritorious Unit Commendation

Insignia
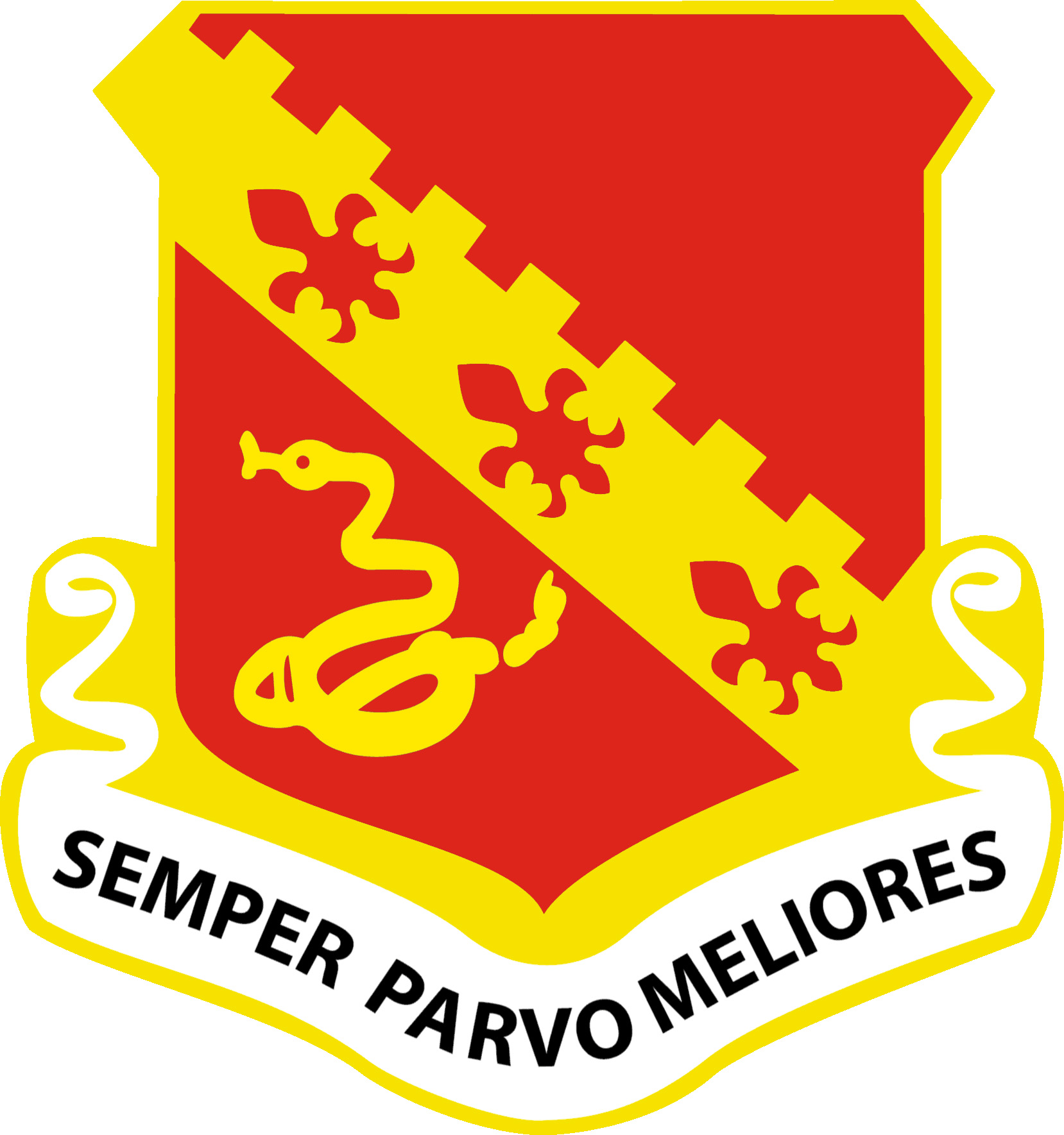
- Distinctive unit insignia

The 130th Field Artillery Regiment is a United States Army field artillery regiment, represented in the Kansas Army National Guard by the 2nd Battalion, 130th Field Artillery, part of the 130th Field Artillery Brigade at Hiawatha, Kansas.

The regiment was originally organized in 1917 after the United States entry into World War I as the 1st Field Artillery of the Kansas National Guard. Later that year, it mustered into Federal service and was reorganized as the 130th Field Artillery, fighting with the 35th Division in the American Expeditionary Forces in France. After the end of World War I the regiment returned home and was demobilized, briefly reverting to its state designation. In 1921 it became the 130th Field Artillery again and was assigned to the 35th Division. Inducted into Federal service on 23 December 1940 for eventual service in World War II, the regiment was broken up on 1 March 1942 into the 130th (the former 1st Battalion) and 154th (the former 2nd Battalion) Field Artillery Battalions, which were relieved from the 35th Division on 27 January and 12 January 1943, respectively .

The 130th Field Artillery Battalion remained stateside until 2 December 1944, when it was sent to Europe, serving in Germany in the final months of the war. The 154th was sent to Alaska on temporary duty on 27 July 1942, fought in the Aleutian Islands Campaign, and after its official relief from the 35th Division was later deployed to the Pacific Theater. Postwar, both battalions returned to state service, with the 130th becoming the 130th Armored Field Artillery Battalion. In 1959 both battalions consolidated as the 130th Artillery under the Combat Arms Regimental System.
