= 129th Field Artillery Regiment =

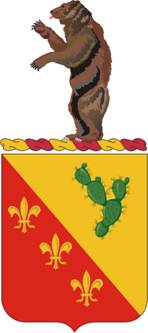
- Coat of arms
- Active: 1866-1873; 1887-1899; 1905-1919; 1946-present
- Country: United States
- Allegiance: Missouri
- Branch: Missouri Army National Guard
- Type: Field artillery
- Nickname: Truman's Own
- Motto: SEND YOUR MISSION
- Engagements: World War I

Insignia
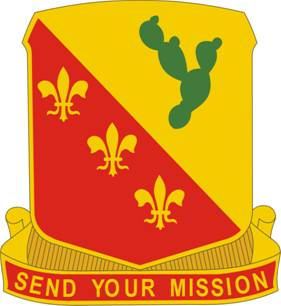
- Distinctive Unit Insignia

The 129th Field Artillery Regiment is a regiment of the Field Artillery Branch of the United States Army, part of the Missouri Army National Guard. The 1st Battalion is the only active unit of the regiment, with the battalion Headquarters and Headquarters Battery in Maryville, Battery A in Albany, Battery B in Chillicothe, and Battery D in Independence. The battalion is a subordinate unit of the 130th Field Artillery Brigade, headquartered in Manhattan, Kansas.

== History ==
On 22 November 1866, a Missouri Militia company known as the "Kansas City Guards" was organized at Kansas City, Missouri. It was disbanded in April 1873. The company was reconstituted in the Missouri National Guard on 18 November 1887 as the "Kansas City Light Battery" and was redesignated on 18 December 1888, as Battery B, Artillery. It was disbanded on 6 November 1899. On 14 June 1905, Battery B was reconstituted in the Missouri National Guard, and on 4 February 1915, was consolidated with Battery A and Battery C, Artillery, to form the 1st Separate Battalion of Field Artillery. On 25 June 1916, the battalion was mustered into federal service for service on the Mexican border, and was mustered out on 21–22 December 1916 at Fort Riley, Kansas. On 29 June 1917, the battalion was expanded and redesignated as the 2nd Regiment, Field Artillery. On 5 August 1917, the regiment was drafted into federal service for World War I. On 1 October 1917, the regiment was redesignated the 129th Field Artillery Regiment and assigned to the 35th Division.

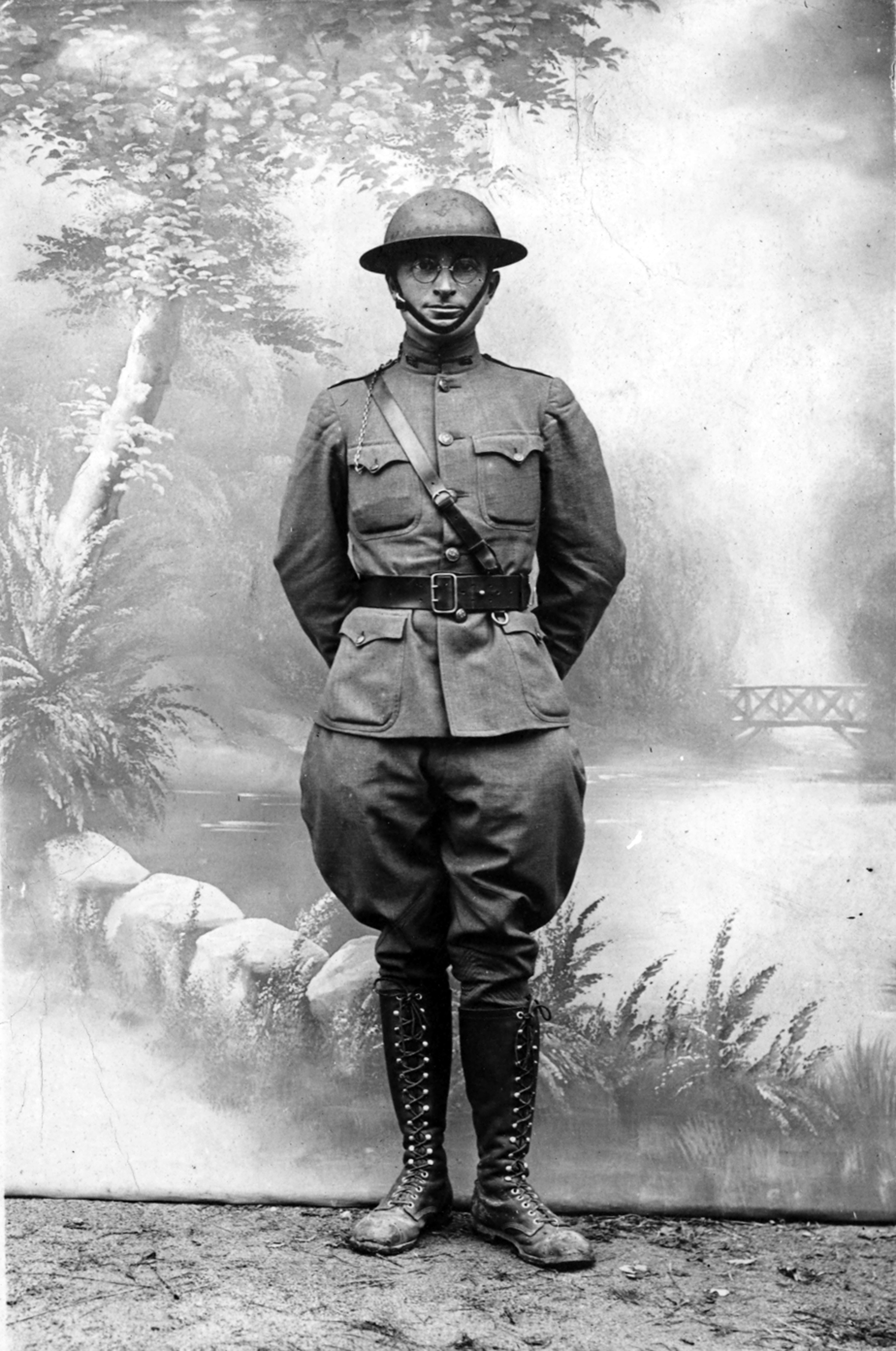
Captain Harry S Truman-the only "redleg" (artillery soldier) to become President

The 129th is notable for its service in World War I, with Battery D under the command of then-Captain Harry S. Truman, later President of the United States from 1945 to 1953. In recognition of this fact, this unit has the official designation "Truman's Own." The distinction of having had a battery that was commanded by a future U.S. president is also recognized by the presence of a battery designated "D", being the letter assigned to the battery Truman commanded, in lieu of a C Battery.

The regiment was mustered out of service on 6 May 1919 at Fort Riley. The 129th Field Artillery was reconstituted in the National Guard on 29 July 1921, allotted to the state of Missouri, and assigned to the General Headquarters Reserve. The regiment was not called for in the modified National Guard manpower program issued in January 1923, and so was placed on the Deferred National Guard list and allotted to the Organized Reserve as the 418th Field Artillery Regiment (DNG). Although it was allotted to the state of South Dakota and was organized by 1924, with the abandonment of the Deferred List concept, the regiment was withdrawn from the Organized Reserve in 1927 and demobilized.

On 27 June 1946, the unit was reconstituted in the Missouri National Guard as the 129th Field Artillery Battalion and assigned to the 35th Infantry Division. It was organized and federally recognized on 20 October 1947 with Headquarters at Maryville, Missouri. It was reorganized and redesignated on 15 April 1959 as the 129th Artillery, a parent regiment under the Combat Arms Regimental System, to consist of the 1st Howitzer Battalion, an element of the 35th Infantry Division. Reorganized 1 April 1963 to consist of the 1st Howitzer Battalion. Reorganized 15 January 1968 to consist of the 1st Battalion. Redesignated 1 March 1972 as the 129th Field Artillery. Withdrawn 1 June 1989 from the Combat Arms Regimental System and reorganized under the United States Army Regimental System. Redesignated 1 October 2005 as the 129th Field Artillery Regiment.

== Campaign participation credit ==
=== World War I ===
- Meuse-Argonne
- Alsace 1918
- Lorraine 1918

The antecedents of Headquarters Battery and Battery A were respectively designated Battery C and Headquarters Battery and Combat Train, 1st Battalion, 128th Field Artillery Regiment, later redesigned the 128th Armored Field Artillery Battalion and assigned to the 6th Armored Division during World War II. They are additionally entitled to campaign participation credit for:

=== World War II ===
- Normandy
- Northern France
- Rhineland
- Ardennes-Alsace
- Central Europe

The antecedent of Battery B, 1st Battalion was designated Headquarters Company, 138th Infantry Regiment, prior to and during World War II. It is additionally entitled to campaign participation credit for:

- Aleutian Islands

== Decorations ==
Battery B (Chillicothe), 1st Battalion, additionally entitled to:

- Meritorious Unit Commendation (Army), Streamer embroidered AFGHANISTAN MAR 2007-MAR 2008

Battery D (Independence), 1st Battalion, additionally entitled to:

- Army Superior Unit Award, Streamer embroidered 2003-2005

== Distinctive unit insignia ==
- Description

A Gold color metal and enamel device 1 3/32 inches (2.8 cm) in height overall consisting of a shield blazoned: Per bend Or and Gules, in chief a prickly pear cactus Vert and in base three fleurs-de-lis in bend of the first. Attached below the shield a Red scroll inscribed “SEND YOUR MISSION” in Gold letters.

- Symbolism

The colors red and yellow are for Artillery. The prickly pear cactus is symbolic of the organization's Mexican Border service. The three fleurs-de-lis represent the three battle honors (Meuse-Argonne, Alsace and Lorraine) awarded the battalion for service during World War I.

- Background

The distinctive unit insignia was originally approved for the 129th Field Artillery Battalion on 28 August 1952. It was redesignated for the 129th Artillery Regiment on 26 October 1961. The insignia was redesignated for the 129th Field Artillery Regiment on 17 July 1972.

== Coat of arms ==
=== Blazon ===
- Shield

Per bend Or and Gules, in chief a prickly pear cactus Vert and in base three fleurs-de-lis in bend of the first.

- Crest

That for the regiments and separate battalions of the Missouri Army National Guard: On a wreath of the colors Or and Gules, a grizzly bear standing rampant Proper.

=== Symbolism ===
The colors red and yellow in the Shield are for Artillery. The prickly pear cactus is symbolic of the organization's Mexican Border service. The three fleurs-de-lis represent the three battle honors (Meuse-Argonne, Alsace and Lorraine) awarded the battalion for service during World War I. The crest is that of the Missouri Army National Guard.

=== Background ===
The coat of arms was originally approved for the 129th Field Artillery Battalion on 28 August 1952. It was redesignated for the 129th Artillery Regiment on 26 October 1961. The insignia was redesignated for the 129th Field Artillery Regiment on 17 July 1972.
