= Prominent members of the US Army National Guard =

This article lists the prominent members of the United States Army National Guard.

== Colonial era ==
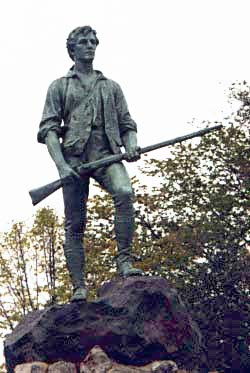
The Lexington Minuteman by Henry Hudson Kitson.

- Israel Putnam
- Robert Rogers
- Myles Standish
- John Stark
- John Underhill
- Seth Warner
- George Washington

== American Revolution ==
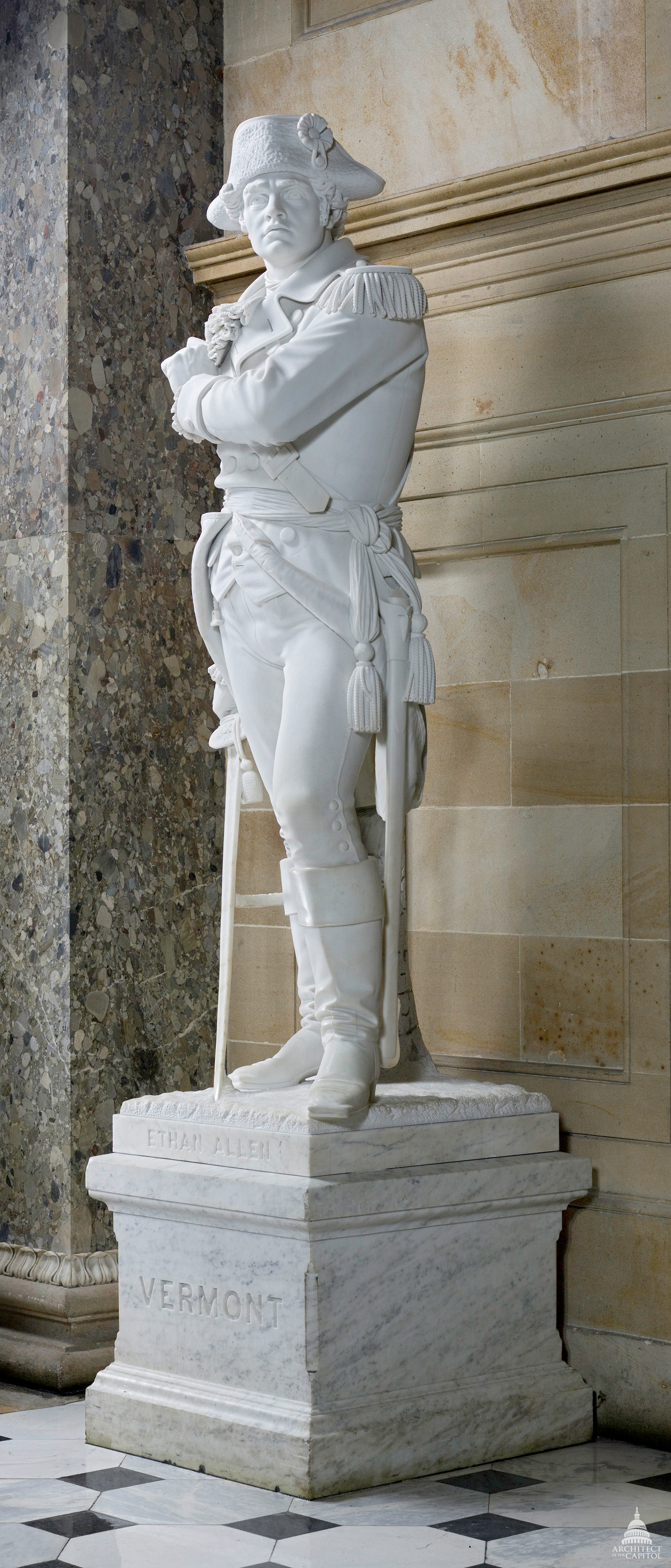
Statue of Ethan Allen at the U.S. Capitol

- Ethan Allen
- Patrick Henry
- Paul Revere

== War of 1812 ==
- James Buchanan
- Samuel Ringgold
- Samuel Smith
- Stephen Van Rensselaer

== 1820s–1840s ==
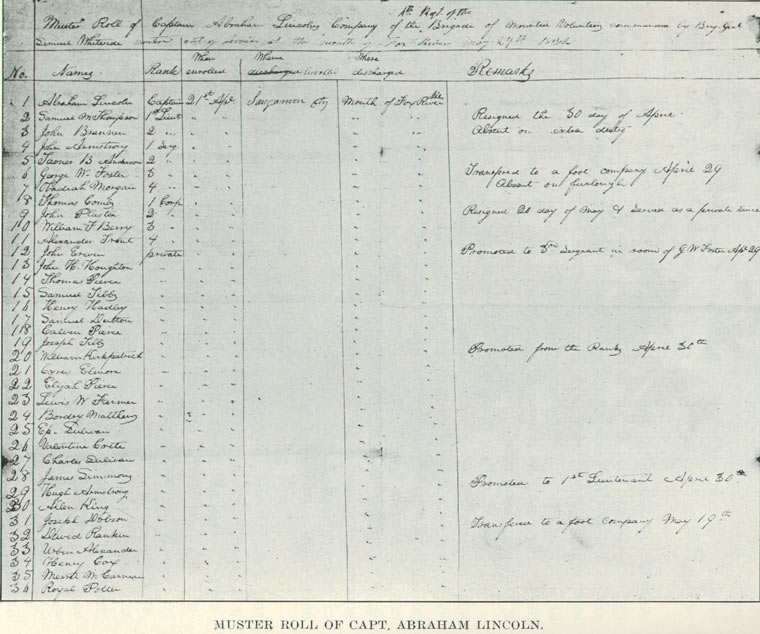
1832 muster roll of Abraham Lincoln's militia company.

- Abraham Lincoln
- Franklin Pierce
- James Polk

== American Civil War ==
- Chester A. Arthur
- Nathaniel B. Baker
- Peter T. Washburn

== Late 1800s ==
- John Jacob Astor IV
- Benjamin O. Davis Sr.
- Christian Fleetwood
- John F. Hartranft
- Theodore Roosevelt

== Early 1900s ==
- Paul Bragg
- William Frank
- Frederick E. Humphreys
- William Leushner
- Cornelius Vanderbilt III
- William Seward Webb

== World War I ==
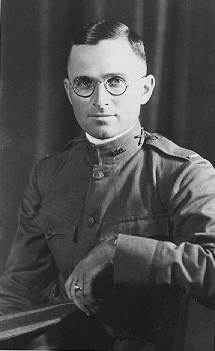
Harry S. Truman as member of Missouri National Guard.

- Carlton Brosius
- Buster Keaton
- James Naismith
- John F. O'Ryan
- Harry S. Truman

== 1920s ==
- Hannes Kolehmainen
- Charles Lindbergh
- Babe Ruth

== 1930s ==
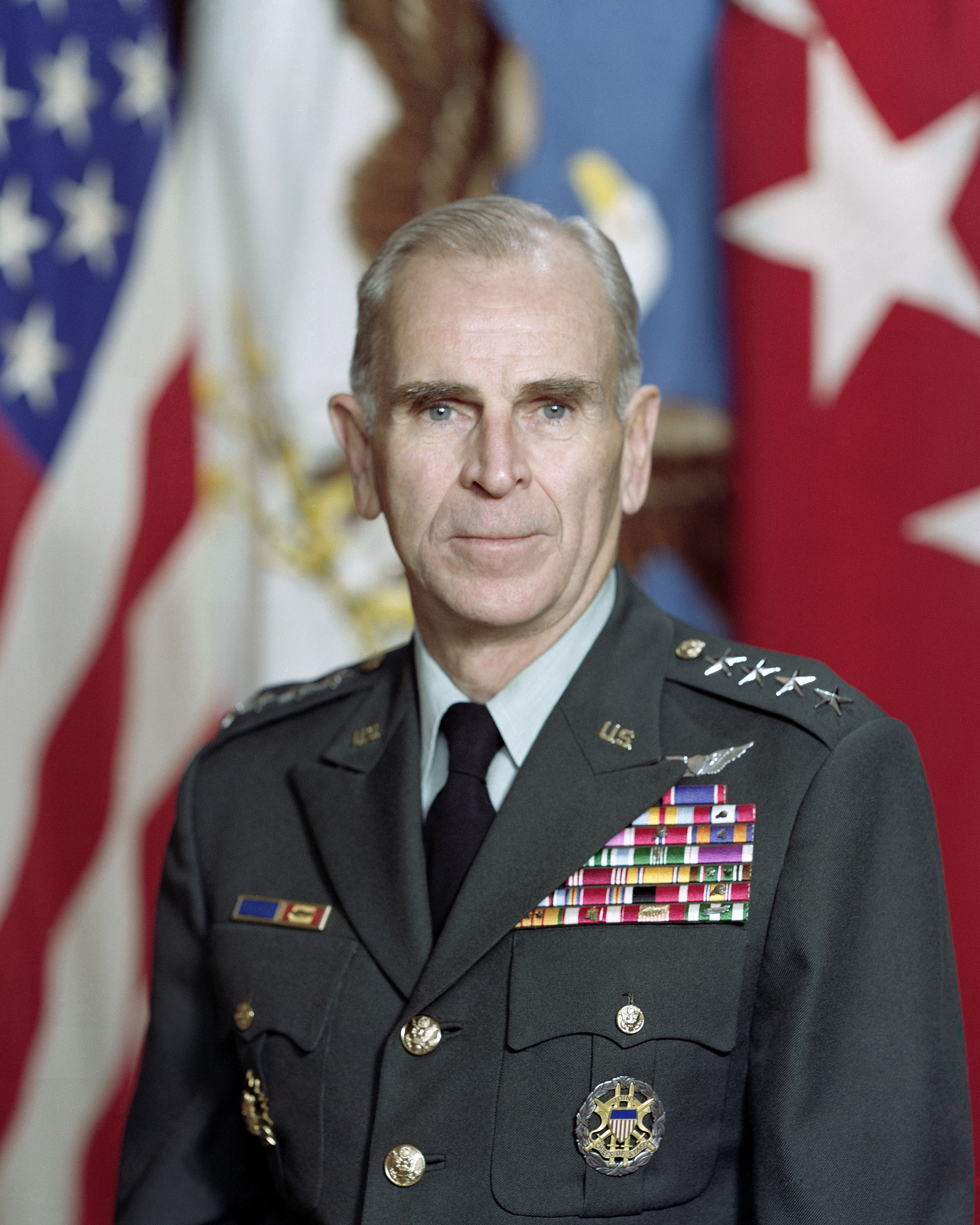
John Vessey, Joint Chiefs of Staff chairman, began career in 1939 as member of Minnesota National Guard's 34th Infantry Division

- Curtis LeMay
- Edward Martin
- Jack Turnbull
- John W. Vessey

== World War II ==
- Julius Ochs Adler
- Robert S. Beightler
- Kenneth F. Cramer
- Irving Fish
- Ernest W. Gibson Jr.
- William S. Key
- Norman Mailer
- Raymond S. McLain
- Butler B. Miltonberger
- Milton Reckord
- Leonard F. Wing
- Rodger Wilton Young
- Cornelius W. Wickersham

== Late 1940s ==
- Jimmy Bloodworth
- Bob Crane

== 1950s ==
- John O. Marsh
- Audie Murphy
- Wendell H. Ford
- Curt Simmons

== 1960s ==
- John Amos
- Willie Davenport
- Ken Holtzman
- Peter T. King
- Tom Selleck

== 1970s ==
- Larry Craig
- Gary Herbert
- Sonny Montgomery
- Butch Otter
- Dan Quayle

== 1980s ==
- Scott Perry
- Michael C. Thompson
- Tim Walz

== 1990s ==
- Jill Bakken
- Paul Babeu
- James G. Blaney

== 2000s ==
- Shauna Rohbock
- Terry Schappert
- Courtney Zablocki

== 2010s ==
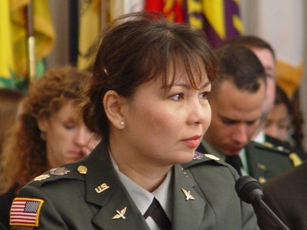
Tammy Duckworth, Illinois Army National Guard helicopter pilot, lost her legs in the Iraq War and was later elected to the U.S. Congress.

- Scott Brown
- Tammy Duckworth
- Tulsi Gabbard
- Leigh Ann Hester
- John Napier
- Jill Stevens
- Tim Kennedy (fighter)
- Alexandra Curtis
- Max Rose
- Mark T. Esper
