= 67th Maneuver Enhancement Brigade =

67th Maneuver Enhancement Brigade 67th Area Support Group 67th Battlefield Surveillance Brigade 67th Infantry Brigade
- Shoulder sleeve insignia
- Active: 1917-2002; 2003-2008; 2008-2016; 2016-present
- Country: United States
- Branch: United States Army National Guard
- Type: Maneuver enhancement brigade
- Size: Brigade
- Part of: Nebraska Army National Guard
- Garrison/HQ: Spirit of ’76 Armory, Lincoln Nebraska
- Nickname: Pike Brigade
- Motto: All Hell Can't Stop Us
- Decorations: Meritorious Unit Commendation

Insignia
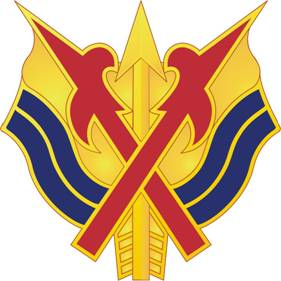
- Distinctive unit insignia

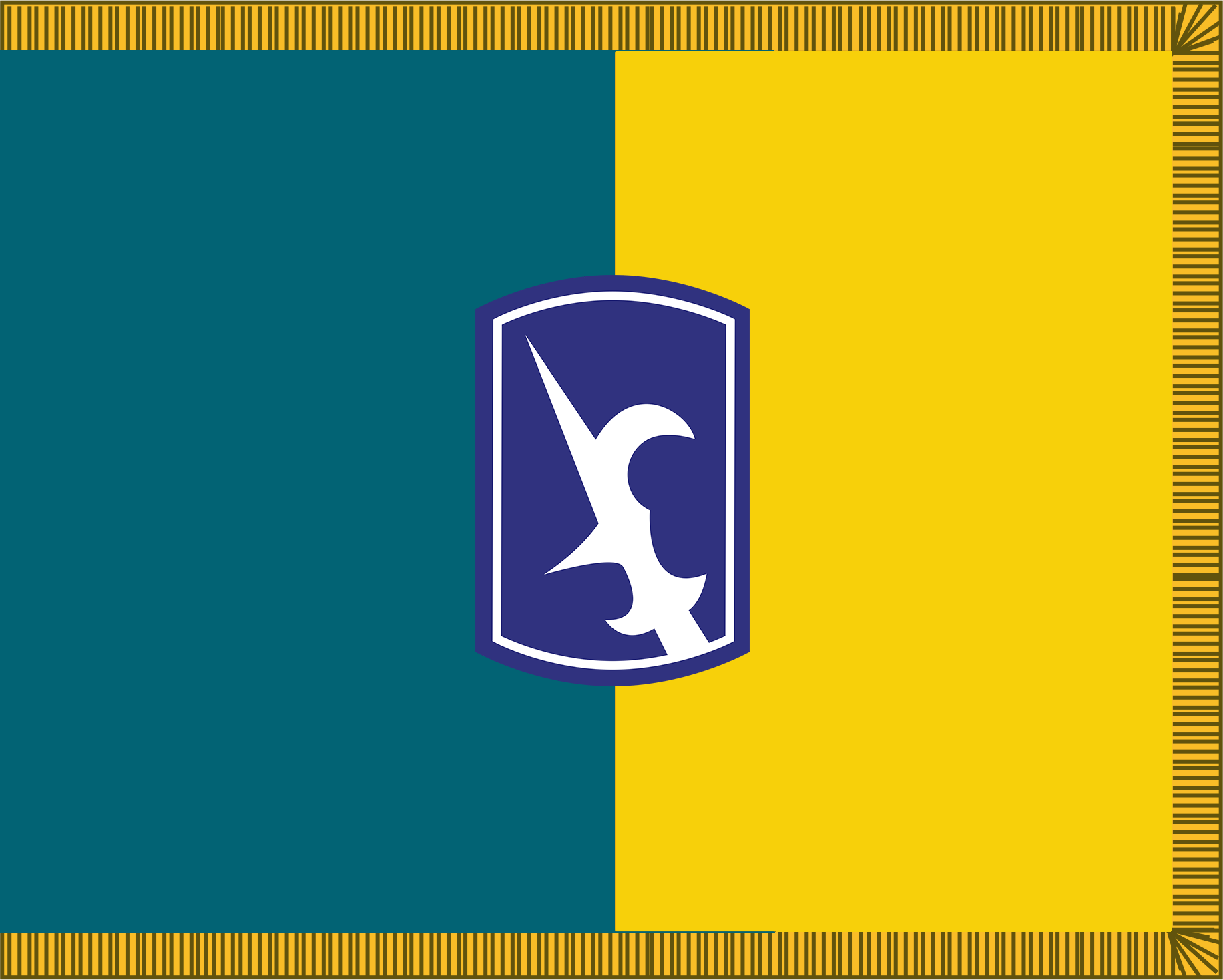
- 67th Maneuver Enhancement Brigade Flag

The 67th Maneuver Enhancement Brigade is a maneuver enhancement brigade (MEB) of the Nebraska Army National Guard (NE ARNG). It derives its lineage from the 67th Infantry Brigade, previously a component of the 35th Infantry Division (Mechanized). 67th Infantry Brigade became an area support group from 2003–2008, and a battlefield surveillance brigade from 2008–2016, before assuming its current form.

== History ==
As the 67th Infantry Brigade, the brigade was initially formed in August 1917 in the Iowa and Nebraska Army National Guards, and was part of the 34th Division mobilized for World War I. It comprised the 133rd Infantry Regiment of Iowa and the 134th Infantry Regiment of Nebraska.

It was demobilized on 18 February 1919 at Camp Grant, Illinois, but reconstituted in the National Guard in 1921, assigned to the 34th Division, and allotted to Iowa. The brigade controlled the 133rd and 168th Infantry Regiments. The Headquarters Company was organized at Winterset, Iowa and federally recognized on 20 July 1921. The Headquarters was organized at Council Bluffs, Iowa and federally recognized on 21 February 1922. The Headquarters changed station to Des Moines, Iowa, 23 August 1924, and to Sioux City, Iowa, 10 July 1940. The Headquarters Company changed station to Des Moines 2 July 1931 by reorganization and redesignation of the Headquarters Company, 1st Battalion, 168th Infantry Regiment. It was inducted into active federal service on 10 February 1941 and moved to Camp Claiborne, Louisiana. On 30 January 1941, the headquarters was disbanded and the Headquarters Company converted into the 34th Cavalry Reconnaissance Troop (Mechanized). The lineage of this iteration of the 67th Infantry Brigade is not claimed by any unit in the state of Nebraska.

=== Early years ===
The 67th Separate Infantry Brigade was formed on 1 April 1963 due to the elimination of the Nebraska–Iowa 34th Infantry Division under the Reorganization Objective Army Division TOE. The brigade included the Nebraska units formerly part of the 34th Division; its number and Centennial Brigade nickname emphasized its all-Nebraska nature, referencing the centennial of Nebraska statehood in 1867. Headquartered at Lincoln, it included the 1st and 2nd Battalions of the 134th Infantry, the 2nd Howitzer Battalion of the 168th Artillery (equipped with 105 mm self-propelled howitzers), and the 167th Quartermaster Company. On 1 March 1964 the brigade was reorganized as mechanized infantry and redesignated as the 67th Infantry Brigade. As a result, Troop E, 167th Cavalry was converted from the Fremont elements of the 167th Quartermaster Company to become the brigade armored reconnaissance troop. The 67th Support Battalion and the 867th Engineer Company replaced the 167th Quartermaster Company and the western Iowa 2nd Battalion, 133rd Infantry was attached to the brigade. The brigade was selected to be part of the Selected Reserve Force (SRF), which allowed it to be brought to full strength, in October 1965. The 1968 reduction of the National Guard resulted in the brigade becoming an all-Nebraska unit once again, with the 128th Engineer Battalion and the 2nd Howitzer Battalion, 168th Artillery being eliminated to form the new 1st Battalion, 168th Artillery and 1st Battalion, 195th Armor. The 1-168th Artillery was the brigade direct support artillery battalion while the 1-195th Armor was officially a nondivisional unit, but often trained with the 67th Brigade. The 1-195th Armor was assigned to the brigade on 1 November 1978.

The brigade consisted of (among other units) 1st Bn, 134th Infantry; 2nd Bn, 134th Infantry (later inactivated); 1st Battalion, 195th Armor; Troop E, 167th Cavalry; and the 867th Engineer Company. This brigade was assigned as a "round out" brigade to the 4th Infantry Division. In the event of conflict the 67th Brigade would have come under the command of the 4th Infantry Division as one of its organic brigades; the 67th trained annually with the 4th Infantry Division at Fort Carson, Colorado.

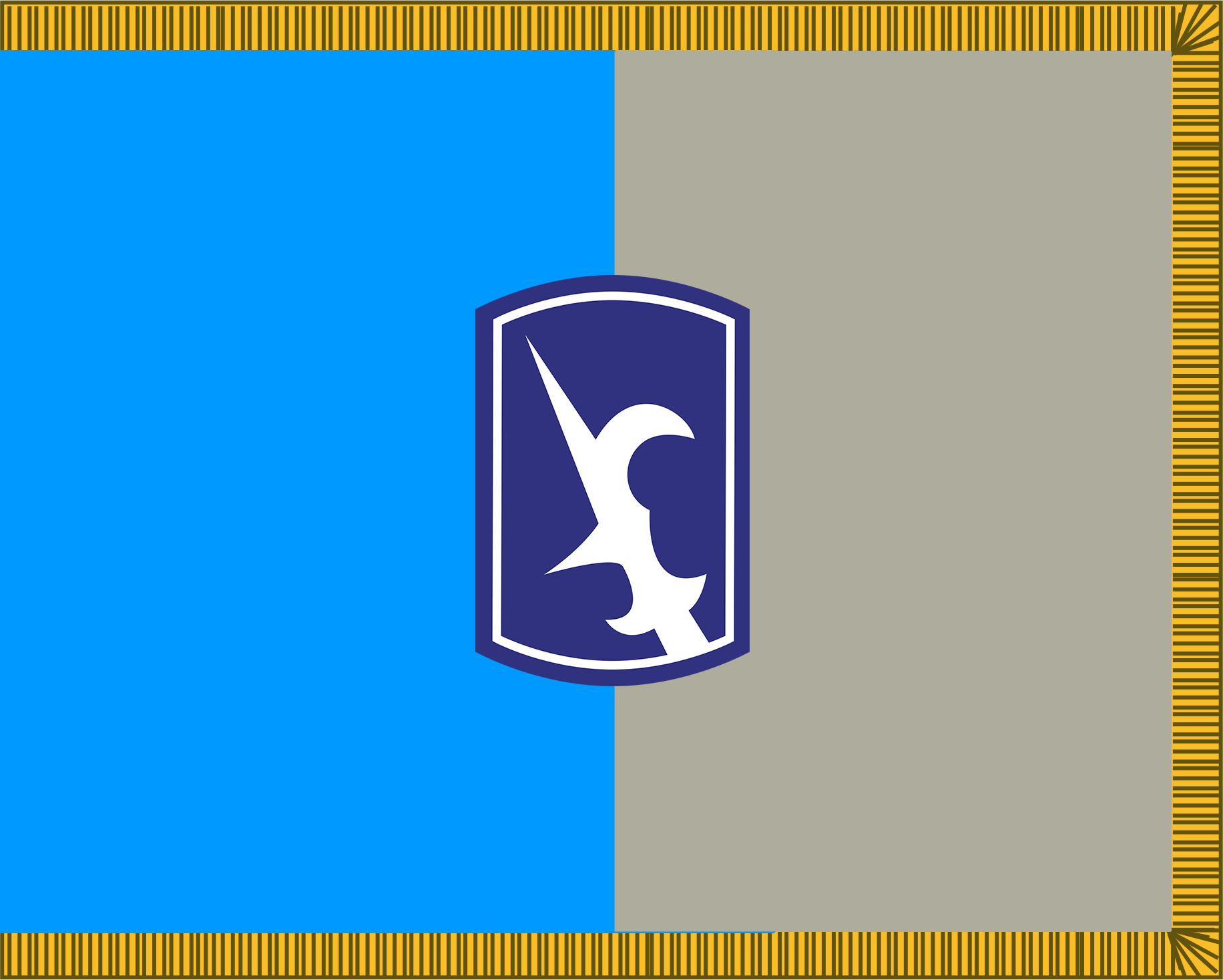
67th Battlefield Surveillance Brigade Flag

State ARNG newspapers reporting the recreation of the BfSB in 2008 say that the infantry brigade was reformed in 1962, with its main elements being the 1st and 2nd Battalions of the 134th Infantry Regiment. Other combat units that were part of the brigade from the 1960s eventually included the 1st Battalion, 168th Field Artillery Regiment, and Troop E, 167th Cavalry, which was constituted and assigned in 1964.

The brigade was then assigned to the 35th ID, from 1985 to 2002.

=== Twenty-first century ===
Material reproduced by Globalsecurity.org from 2001–2002, seemingly originally drawn from state National Guard sources, said:

These change comes as a result of the restructuring of the National Guard's to better meet the needs and requirements of the regular Army, and is one step in a seven-year process aimed at transforming the 67th Infantry Brigade into a support group.
As of mid-2001, the process which had started in central Nebraska was four years along, and the regiment's 1–195th Armor and 67th Forward Support battalions were in various stages of transition.

During the U.S. phase of the Iraq War, in 2010-2011, the 67th Battlefield Surveillance Brigade was deployed to Iraq. An investigation into the command climate of the brigade commander, Colonel Philip Stemple, blasted the former commander as a “bullying leader” whose tenure triggered two congressional inquiries. Stemple publicly "belittled, berated or disrespect[ed] fellow soldiers, according to an Army 15-6 investigation obtained by Army Times." Stemple was retired as a result of the reports.

It was announced in 2015 that 67th BFSB would transition to a Maneuver Enhancement Brigade.

In 2003 it was converted to the 67th Area Support Group. On 7 September 2008, it was converted into the 67th BfSB. On 5 November 2016, the brigade formally reorganized as a maneuver enhancement brigade.

== Organization ==
- 67th Maneuver Enhancement Brigade, in Lincoln
  - Headquarters and Headquarters Company, 67th Maneuver Enhancement Brigade, in Lincoln
  - 234th Brigade Signal Company, in Lincoln
  - 126th Chemical Battalion, in Omaha
    - Headquarters and Headquarters Company, 126th Chemical Battalion, in Omaha
    - 43rd Army Band, in Omaha
    - Cyber Protection Team 179, in Omaha
  - 128th Engineer Battalion, in Columbus
    - Headquarters and Headquarters Company, 128th Engineer Battalion, in Columbus
    - Forward Support Company, 128th Engineer Battalion, in Hastings
    - 623rd Engineer Company (Vertical Construction Company), in Wahoo
    - 181st Engineer Detachment (Fire Fighting Team — Fire Truck), in Norfolk
    - 281st Engineer Detachment (Fire Fighting Team — Fire Truck), in Hastings
    - 317th Engineer Detachment (Fire Fighting Team — Fire Truck), in Norfolk
    - 617th Engineer Detachment (Fire Fighting Team — Fire Truck), in Hastings
    - 755th Engineer Detachment (Fire Fighting Team — HQ), in Columbus
  - 402nd Military Police Battalion, in Omaha
    - Headquarters and Headquarters Detachment, 402nd Military Police Battalion, in Omaha
    - 192nd Military Police Detachment (Law Enforcement), in Omaha
    - 1057th Military Police Company, in Chadron
  - 734th Combat Sustainment Support Battalion, in Kearney
    - 189th Transportation Company (Medium Truck) (Cargo), in Norfolk
    - 267th Ordnance Company (Support Maintenance), at Lincoln Air National Guard Base
    - 901st Quartermaster Platoon (Field Feeding), in Lincoln
    - 1075th Transportation Company (Medium Truck) (Cargo), in North Platte
      - Detachment 1, 1075th Transportation Company, in McCook

== 67th BfSB Organization, 2008–2016 ==
- Headquarters and Headquarters Company (HHC) 67th Battlefield Surveillance Brigade (67th BfSB) (NE-ARNG)
- 1st Squadron, 134th Cavalry Regiment (1-134th Cavalry Regiment) (Reconnaissance & Surveillance) (NE-ARNG)
- 1167th Brigade Support Maintenance Company (1167th BSMC) (NE-ARNG)
- 234th Network Support Company (234th NSC) (NE-ARNG)
- 192nd Military Police Detachment (192nd MPD) (NE-ARNG)(administratively attached; assigned to the 402nd Military Police Battalion)
- 1st Battalion, 376th Aviation Regiment (NE-ARNG)(administratively attached; assigned to the Combat Aviation Brigade, 35th Infantry Division)
- 250th Military Intelligence Battalion (250th MIB) (CA-ARNG)

== Commanders ==
- As 67th Infantry Brigade (Mechanized)
  - Brigadier General Hubert A. Allen 25 August 1917 – 18 March 1918
  - Lieutenant Colonel Albert H. Hollingsworth (ad interim)
  - Brigadier General Hubert A. Allen 22 March 1918 – 14 November 1918
  - Brigadier General William F. Bachman April 1963 – March 1968
  - Brigadier General Dayle Williamson December 1983 – August 1985
- As 67th Brigade, 35th Infantry Division
- As 67th Area Support Group
- As 67th Battlefield Surveillance Brigade (BfSB) Commanders:
  - Colonel David Petersen
  - Colonel Philip Stemple June 2010 – 28 Apr 2011
  - Lieutenant Colonel Brett Andersen 28 Apr 2011 – June 2011
  - Colonel Michael Deger June 2011 – March 2013
  - Colonel Brett Andersen – March 2013 to April 2014
  - Colonel Kevin Lyons – April 2014
  - Lt. Col. Rich Gray -
- As 67th Maneuver Enhancement Brigade
  - Colonel Craig Strong – November 2016 – 2018
  - Colonel Todd Stevens – 2018 – 2020
  - Brigadier General Brian Medcalf – 2020 – Present

== Lineage and honors ==
=== Lineage ===
- Organized and Federally recognized 6 July 1921 in the Nebraska National Guard at Lincoln as Headquarters Company, 3d Battalion, 1st Infantry
- Redesignated 25 October 1921 as Headquarters Company, 3d Battalion, 134th Infantry
- Redesignated 1 May 1940 as Headquarters Detachment, 3d Battalion, 134th Infantry
- Inducted into Federal service 23 December 1940 at Lincoln as an element of the 35th Division (later designated as the 35th Infantry Division)
- Redesignated 1 August 1942 as Headquarters Company, 3d Battalion, 134th Infantry
- Inactivated 21 November 1945 at Camp Breckinridge, Kentucky
- Relieved 19 June 1946 from assignment to the 35th Infantry Division
- Consolidated 20 June 1946 with the 242d Field Artillery Battalion (see ANNEX ) and consolidated unit converted and redesignated as the 195th Tank Battalion
- Reorganized, redesignated, and Federally recognized 12 July 1948 with headquarters at Lincoln
- Redesignated 1 September 1950 as the 195th Tank Battalion
- Battalion broken up 1 May 1959 and its elements reorganized and redesignated as follows:
  - Headquarters, Headquarters and Service Company, and the Medical Detachment as Headquarters and Headquarters Company, 2d Battle Group, 134th Infantry
  - (Company A as Company B, 2d Battle Group, 134th Infantry; Company B as part of Headquarters Company, 128th Engineer Battalion; Company C as Company A, 128th Engineer Battalion; and Company D as part of Company D, 1st Battle Group, 134th Infantry – hereafter separate lineages)
- Headquarters and Headquarters Company, 2d Battle Group, 134th Infantry consolidated 1 April 1963 with Headquarters Company (part), 234th Signal Battalion (organized and Federally recognized 1 May 1959 at Lincoln) and consolidated unit reorganized and redesignated as Headquarters and Headquarters Company, 67th Separate Infantry Brigade
- Reorganized and redesignated 1 March 1964 as Headquarters and Headquarters Company, 67th Infantry Brigade
- Reorganized and redesignated 1 October 1985 as Headquarters and Headquarters Company, 67th Brigade, 35th Infantry Division
- Reorganized and redesignated 1 September 2003 as Headquarters and Headquarters Company, 67th Support Group
- Ordered into active Federal service 17 July 2005 at Lincoln; released from active Federal service 12 January 2007 and reverted to state control
- Converted and redesignated 1 September 2008 as Headquarters and Headquarters Company, 67th Battlefield Surveillance Brigade
- Ordered into active Federal service 8 July 2010 at Lincoln; released from active Federal service 11 August 2011 and reverted to state control
- Reorganized and redesignated 5 November 2016as Headquarters and Headquarters Company, 67th Maneuver Enhancement Brigade

ANNEX

- Constituted 7 July 1942 in the Army of the United States as the 242d Field Artillery Battalion
- Activated 20 August 1942 at Camp White, Oregon
- Inactivated 30 November 1945 at Camp Shanks, New York

HOME STATION: Lincoln

=== Campaign participation credit ===
- World War II: Normandy; Northern France; Rhineland; Ardennes-Alsace; Central Europe
- War on Terrorism: Campaigns to be determined

=== Decorations ===
- Presidential Unit Citation (Army), Streamer embroidered BASTOGNE
- Meritorious Unit Commendation (Army), Streamer embroidered IRAQ 2010–2011
- French Croix de Guerre with Palm, World War II, Streamer embroidered ST. LO

== See also ==
- Transformation of the United States Army
