= Kenneth Kramer =

Kenneth Kramer could refer to:

- Ken Kramer (Kenneth Bentley Kramer, born 1942), American politician
- Ken Kramer (broadcaster), American television and radio broadcaster
- Kenny Kramer (born 1943), American stand-up comedian and the inspiration for the fictional character Cosmo Kramer on the American television show Seinfeld

== See also ==
- Kenneth F. Cramer (1894-1954), American politician and U.S. Army general
