= 134th Cavalry Regiment =

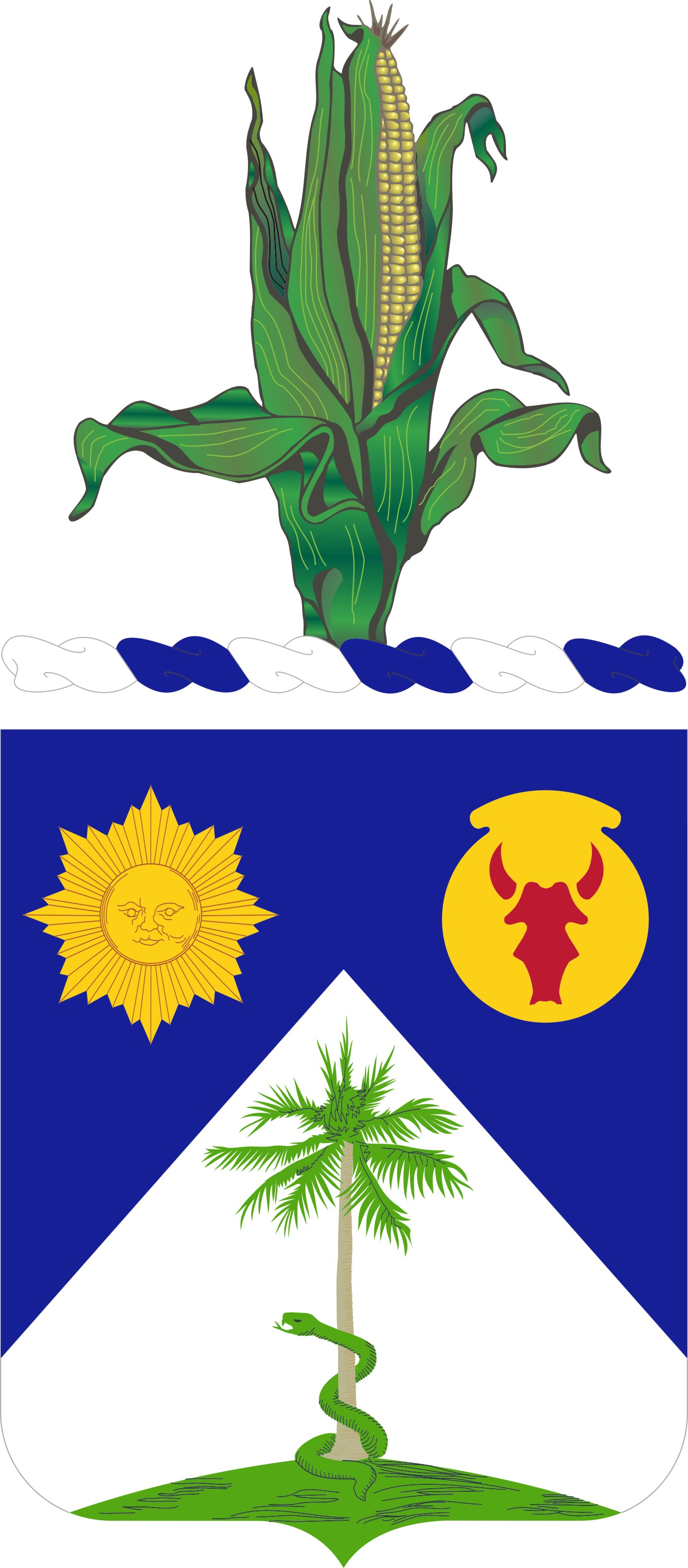
- Coat of arms
- Active: 1855–present
- Country: United States
- Allegiance: Nebraska; United States
- Branch: Nebraska Army National Guard
- Type: Cavalry
- Size: Regiment (one squadron active)
- Garrison/HQ: Yutan, Nebraska
- Nicknames: "First Nebraska" (special designation) "Nebraska's Own"
- Mottos: "Lah We Lah His" (The Strong, The Brave)
- Engagements: American Indian Wars; American Civil War; Spanish–American War; Philippine–American War; World War I; World War II; War on terror

Commanders
- Notable commanders: Colonel Butler B. Miltonberger

Insignia
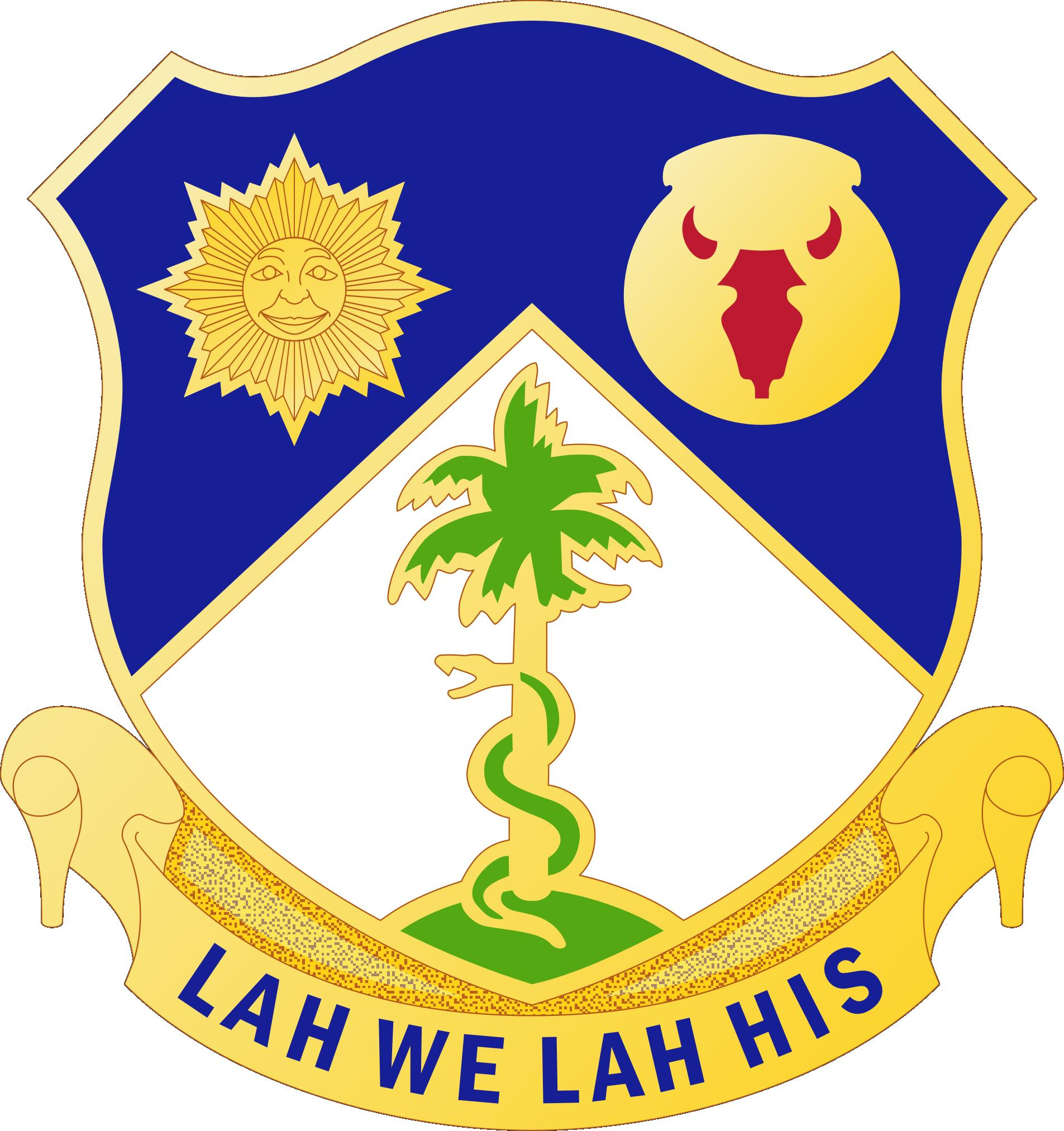
- DUI

The 134th Cavalry Regiment (formerly the 134th Infantry Regiment) is a cavalry regiment in the Nebraska Army National Guard. By extension, it is a member of the United States Army National Guard, and as a currently federally-recognized unit, also a member of the National Guard of the United States.

== History ==
=== Initial formation ===
The 134th Cavalry Regiment's history can be traced to 1855 with the formation of the 1st and 2nd Regiments, Nebraska Militia, to protect settlers from Native Americans in the territory. On 23 December 1854, acting Governor Thomas B. Cuming ordered the creation of militia companies to be organized into two regiments comprising one brigade. Each company was assigned to a regiment based on its location, with companies north of the Platte River being assigned to the 1st Regiment and those to the south assigned to the 2nd. Because of a lack of surviving records, the exact composition of these regiments is unknown.

On 23 January 1856 "An act to organize the Nebraska Volunteers." was passed within the state legislature, changing the organization of the territory's militia forces. The act declared that the militia of Nebraska should consist of one division of two brigades. The brigades took over where the regiments used to exist, with the 1st to the north of the Platte and the 2nd to the south. Regiments and battalions were then formed by the discretion of the brigade and division commanders. Companies were formed independently, and each company voted to select their branch of service upon their formation. One day after the passing of the act, a vote was held to select the division and brigade commanders. John M. Thayer, commander of the 1st Brigade, Nebraska Militia was unanimously elected major general and commander of the 1st Division. L.L. Bowen was appointed commander of the 1st Brigade and H.P. Downs was selected to command the 2nd Brigade. Elements of the division operated against hostile natives until the beginning of the Civil War in 1861.

=== Civil War ===
When the war started, U.S. Regular Army troops were withdrawn from Fort Kearny and Fort Randall to serve in more threatened areas, but at the increased risk to Nebraska settlers from Indian attacks. The federal government requested that the Nebraska Territory form a volunteer regiment, with some companies supposed to stay behind to protect the territory. The territorial legislature met in special session in Omaha, and agreed to raise the requested local defense force. Thus, the 1st Nebraska Infantry Regiment was organized at Omaha, between June 11 and July 21, 1861, with the future governor of Nebraska and the Wyoming Territory, John Milton Thayer, as its first colonel. However, the promise was reneged, and the regiment was sent eastward in August to fight the Confederacy. The regiment camped at various sites in Missouri, including Pilot Knob, throughout the fall and winter of 1861–1862.

After joining the Union forces under Ulysses S. Grant, the 1st Nebraska Infantry participated in the successful attack on Fort Donelson in Tennessee, fought at the Battle of Shiloh in April 1862, and took part in the Union advance on, and siege of, Corinth, Mississippi. The unit then participated in several minor engagements in Missouri and Arkansas.

==== Conversion to cavalry ====
The regiment was mounted as cavalry and redesignated the 1st Nebraska Cavalry Regiment on November 5, 1863. It was transferred to the frontier to keep the Plains Indians in check. It was amalgamated with the 1st Nebraska Veteran Cavalry Battalion in 1865, and mustered out of the Union Army on 1 July 1866 at Omaha.

=== Postbellum to World War I ===
The Nebraska State Militia functioned as independent companies until 1875, when the 1st Regiment of Mounted Infantry (1875-76) and the 2nd Regiment of Infantry (1878-79) were formed. On 13 July 1881, the remaining companies of these units were consolidated as the 1st Regiment, Nebraska National Guard (Nebraska State Militia redesignated Nebraska National Guard by act of the legislature 28 February 1881). The 1st Nebraska Infantry was mustered into federal service at Lincoln on 9-10 May 1898 for the Spanish-American War as the 1st Nebraska Volunteer Infantry, and mustered out of service on 23 August 1899 at San Francisco, California. The 1st Nebraska Infantry was reorganized in state service on 11 June 1900. In 1913, the 1st and 2nd Nebraska Infantry Regiments were consolidated. Companies located north of the Platte River were reorganized as part of the new 4th Infantry, while companies south of the Platte River were reorganized as part of the new 5th Infantry. The 4th and 5th Infantry Regiments were mustered into service for the Pancho Villa Expedition on 3 July 1916, and mustered out of federal service on 21 February 1917.

=== World War I ===
The 5th Nebraska Infantry was called into federal service for World War I on 15 July 1917, and was designated to form part of the 34th Division, on 18 July. The regiment was drafted into federal service on 5 August. It proceeded to Camp Cody, near Deming, New Mexico, for training. On 1 October, the 34th Division was reorganized under General John J. Pershing's tables of organization of August 1917, and the 5th Nebraska was redesignated the 134th Infantry, part of the 67th Brigade. Training began, and draftees arrived from Camp Funston, Kansas, and Camp Dodge, Iowa, in October and November. In June 1918, nearly all trained personnel of the 34th Division were sent overseas to replace casualties in the American Expeditionary Forces in France, and replacements chiefly from Arizona, Colorado, Kansas, New Mexico, Oklahoma, and Texas were sent to the division to bring it to full strength. The 34th Division proceeded overseas in stages from 20 August-24 October 1918, but on 17 October, was ordered "skeletonized" on arrival with most personnel sent to the 2nd Depot Division for transfer to other frontline units. On 29 October, officers remaining in the 34th Division were informed that it was not contemplated for reconstitution, and the Armistice of 11 November 1918 ended the war shortly after.

=== Interwar period ===
==== Organization ====
The 134th Infantry Regiment returned to the United States aboard the USS General G. W. Goethals, arriving at the port of New York on 24 January 1919. The regiment proceeded to Camp Grant, Illinois, where it was mustered out of federal service, demobilized, and personnel discharged on 18 February 1919. Like many other states, Nebraska did not immediately reorganize its National Guard after World War I, instead choosing to wait for the War Department to present it an allotment of troops authorized per the amendments to the National Defense Act of 1916. This proved problematic. The Omaha race riot of 1919 forced the state to call upon federal troops at Fort Crook and Fort Omaha, and when a response was not received in a timely manner, the remaining Home Guard troops nearest the riot and a volunteer force of 300 World War I veterans were mobilized. However, the riot concluded by the time these troops were ready to move.

In late July 1920, after receiving its initial allotment which included one regiment of infantry, provisional companies were gradually organized and federally recognized in towns across the state: the 1st Separate Company at Scottsbluff on 29 July 1920; the 2nd Separate Company at Omaha on 17 August 1920; the 3rd Separate Company at Hartington on 29 October 1920; the 4th Separate Company at Beatrice on 26 January 1921; the 5th Separate Company at Mitchell on 29 December 1920; the 6th Separate Company at Auburn on 15 December 1920; the 7th Separate Company at Falls City on 28 January 1921; the 8th Separate Company at Omaha on 25 January 1921; the 9th Separate Company at Hastings on 9 February 1921; the 10th Separate Company at Grand Island on 25 March 1921; the 11th Separate Company at Fairmont on 28 March 1921; the 12th Separate Company at Lincoln on 26 April 1921; the 13th Separate Company at York on 14 April 1921; the 14th Separate Company at Seward on 7 June 1921. The regimental headquarters company was organized at Omaha on 30 June 1921, while the 1st, 2nd, and 3rd Battalion Headquarters Companies were respectively organized at Nebraska City, Gering, and Lincoln, on 5, 7, and 6 July 1921. The Medical Detachment was organized at Omaha on 5 July 1921.

On 1 July 1921, the provisional companies of the Nebraska National Guard were reorganized as the 1st Infantry Regiment, Nebraska National Guard. The 6th Separate Company became Company A, the 7th Separate Company became Company B, the 4th Separate Company became Company D, the 1st Separate Company became Company E, the 3rd Separate Company became Company F, the 9th Separate Company became Company G, the 10th Separate Company became Company H, the 12th Separate Company became Company I, the 14th Separate Company became Company M, and the 13th Separate Company became the Service Company. The 134th Infantry Regiment was reconstituted in the National Guard in 1921 and assigned to the state of Nebraska. It was concurrently relieved from the 34th Division and assigned to the 35th Division. Pursuant to the National Defense Act of 1920, the 134th Infantry Regiment was reorganized by a redesignation of the 1st Infantry Regiment, Nebraska National Guard, on 25 October 1921. Curiously, for a brief time (29 March-11 July 1921), the 4th Infantry, Iowa National Guard, was designated the 134th Infantry Regiment; during World War I, the 133rd Infantry had consisted of the 1st Iowa Infantry, Troop C, 1st Iowa Cavalry, the Machine Gun Company, 4th Nebraska Infantry, the 3rd Battalion, 2nd Iowa Infantry, and a separate company of Iowa infantry.

==== Training ====
The 134th Infantry, along with the other units of the Nebraska National Guard, conducted annual training most years at Camp Ashland, along the banks of the Platte River in Saunders County near Ashland. Exceptions to this rule came in 1921 and 1922, when the regiment trained at Camp Dodge, near Des Moines, Iowa, and at the federal rifle range near Plattsmouth, respectively, because Camp Ashland was not yet ready for occupation after being neglected during World War I. In 1937, the 134th Infantry participated with the 35th Division in the Seventh Corps Area concentration of the Fourth Army Maneuvers at Camp Whiteside, Fort Riley, Kansas, and in 1940, in the same kind of maneuvers around Camp Ripley, Minnesota.

==== State duty ====
Companies A, B, I, G, and M of the 134th Infantry, along with several other Nebraska National Guard units, were called to Nebraska City in January-February 1922 for riot control duty after martial law was declared during the nationwide 1921-1922 Amalgamated Meat Cutters strike, which affected the Morton-Gregson plant in the city. Company G was used for traffic control and property protection from 9-12 May 1930 after a tornado struck Hastings. The entire regiment, along with a majority of the entire Nebraska National Guard, was called to Omaha from 15-21 June 1935 and was used for riot control duty after martial law was declared in the city during a major strike of workers of the Omaha Traction Company. From 28 August-6 September 1935, the Howitzer Company and Company E were used for security duties along irrigation canals in Scotts Bluff County after martial law was declared over a water rights dispute.

=== World War II ===
The 134th Infantry was inducted into federal service at home stations on 23 December 1940, and moved to Camp Joseph T. Robinson, Arkansas, where it arrived on 7 January 1941. In August-September 1941, the regiment participated in the Louisiana Maneuvers. The 134th Infantry Regiment was part of the 35th Infantry Division during World War II. Between their landing at Omaha Beach on 5–6 July 1944 and their return to the United States aboard the Queen Mary on 5 September 1945, the regiment liberated or captured 124 towns. During this period, the 134th Infantry Regiment suffered over 10,200 casualties, including more than 1,200 soldiers killed in action.

=== Cold War ===
The 134th Infantry returned to the United States and was inactivated on 21 November 1945 at Camp Breckinridge, Kentucky. On 19 June 1946, the regiment was relieved from the 35th Infantry Division and assigned to the 34th Infantry Division, which was to be made up of troops from Nebraska and Iowa. The regimental headquarters was organized and federally recognized at Omaha on 17 October 1946, and the remainder of the regimental units were organized in 1947 and 1948.

Reorganization of 134th Infantry, 1946-1948
Unit	Location	Federally recognized
HHC, 134th Infantry	Omaha	17 October 1946
Medical Company, 134th Infantry	Omaha	14 October 1947
Service Company, 134th Infantry	York	14 January 1947
Heavy Mortar Company, 134th Infantry	Ogallala	26 January 1948
Heavy Tank Company, 134th Infantry	Gering	7 May 1947
HHC, 1st Battalion, 134th Infantry	Beatrice	7 December 1946
Company A, 134th Infantry	Nebraska City	10 June 1947
Company B, 134th Infantry	Falls City	23 February 1948
Company C, 134th Infantry	Beatrice	10 November 1947
Company D, 134th Infantry	Fairbury	12 November 1947
HHC, 2nd Battalion, 134th Infantry	Seward	24 April 1947
Company E, 134th Infantry	Columbus	5 November 1947
Company F, 134th Infantry	Norfolk	14 November 1947
Company G, 134th Infantry	Hastings	3 November 1947
Company H, 134th Infantry	Grand Island	13 November 1947
HHC, 3rd Battalion, 134th Infantry	North Platte	4 December 1946
Company I, 134th Infantry	Scottsbluff	4 August 1947
Company K, 134th Infantry	Sidney	22 October 1947
Company L, 134th Infantry	Alliance	20 October 1947
Company M, 134th Infantry	North Platte	5 May 1947

==== Pentomic reorganization ====
As part of the Army's reorganization of its divisions under the Pentomic concept which eliminated traditional regiments in favor of smaller and more flexible "battle groups" less vulnerable to Tactical nuclear weapons on the modern battlefield, the 134th Infantry was reorganized effective 1 May 1959 as a parent regiment under the U.S. Army Combat Arms Regimental System to consist of the 1st and 2nd Battle Groups (BG). This move coincided with a larger reorganization of the Nebraska Army National Guard, which included the reorganization of the 128th Engineer Battalion, the conversion of the former 3rd Battalion, 134th Infantry into units of the 128th Engineers and the new 1st and 2nd Howitzer Battalions, 168th Artillery, and the elimination of the 568th Field Artillery Battalion and 195th Tank Battalion. However, no communities in Nebraska that maintained National Guard units lost them in the reorganization.

Reorganization of 134th Infantry as Pentomic battle groups, 1 May 1959
Old unit(s)	New unit	Location
HHC, 134th Infantry, Medical Company, 134th Infantry	HHC, 1st BG, 134th Infantry	Omaha
Company A, 128th Engineer Battalion, 134th Army Band	Combat Support Co., 1st BG, 134th Infantry	Omaha
HHC, 2nd Battalion, 134th Infantry	Company A (-), 1st BG, 134th Infantry	Seward
Battery B, 568th Field Artillery Battalion	2nd Rifle Platoon and Weapons Platoon, Company A, 1st BG, 134th Infantry	Wahoo
Company F, 134th Infantry	Company B, 1st BG, 134th Infantry	Norfolk
Medical Detachment, 128th Engineer Battalion, Company C, 128th Engineer Battalion	Company C, 1st BG, 134th Infantry	Fremont
Service Battery, 568th Field Artillery Battalion	Company D (-), 1st BG, 134th Infantry	Wayne
Company D, 195th Tank Battalion	2nd Rifle Platoon and Weapons Platoon, Company D, 1st BG, 134th Infantry	O'Neill
Company E, 134th Infantry	Company E, 1st BG, 134th Infantry	Columbus
HH&S Company, 195th Tank Battalion, Medical Detachment, 195th Tank Battalion	HHC (-), 2nd BG, 134th Infantry	Lincoln
	Engineer Plat., HHC, 2nd BG, 134th Infantry	Auburn
HHC, 1st Battalion, 134th Infantry	Combat Support Co., 2nd BG, 134th Infantry	Beatrice
Company A, 134th Infantry	Company A, 2nd BG, 134th Infantry	Nebraska City
Company A, 195th Tank Battalion	Company B (-), 2nd BG, 134th Infantry	Auburn
Company B, 134th Infantry	2nd Rifle Platoon and Weapons Platoon, Company B, 2nd BG, 134th Infantry	Falls City
Company C. 134th Infantry	Company C (-), 2nd BG, 134th Infantry	Beatrice
Company D, 134th Infantry	2nd Rifle Platoon and Weapons Platoon, Company C, 2nd BG, 134th Infantry	Fairbury
Company H, 134th Infantry	Company D, 2nd BG, 134th Infantry	Grand Island
Company G, 134th Infantry	Company E, 2nd BG, 134th Infantry	Hastings

Reorganization of remaining units of 134th Infantry, 1 May 1959
Old unit	New unit	Location
Service Company, 134th Infantry	1057th Transportation Company (Light Truck)	York
Company M, 134th Infantry	Company D, 128th Engineer Battalion	North Platte
HHC, 3rd Battalion, 134th Infantry	Company E, 128th Engineer Battalion	North Platte
Company I, 134th Infantry	HHC, 1st Howitzer Battalion, 168th Artillery	Scottsbluff
Tank Company, 134th Infantry	Battery B, 1st Howitzer Battalion, 168th Artillery	Gering
Heavy Mortar Company, 134th Infantry	HHC, 2nd Howitzer Battalion, 168th Artillery	Ogallala
Company L, 134th Infantry	Battery A, 2nd Howitzer Battalion, 168th Artillery	Alliance
Company K, 134th Infantry	Battery B, 2nd Howitzer Battalion, 168th Artillery	Sidney

==== ROAD reorganization ====
In 1963, the Army eliminated the Pentomic division structure in favor of the Reorganization Objective Army Division (ROAD) concept. The 34th Infantry Division was inactivated, and Nebraska elements became part of the 67th Separate Infantry Brigade on 1 April 1963. The brigade's number and "Centennial Brigade" nickname emphasized its nature, referencing the centennial of Nebraska statehood in 1867. Headquartered at Lincoln, it included the 1st and 2nd Battalions of the 134th Infantry, the 2nd Howitzer Battalion, 168th Artillery, and the 167th Quartermaster Company. On 1 March 1964, the brigade was reorganized as a mechanized infantry brigade and redesignated as the 67th Infantry Brigade.

Locations of 134th Infantry Regiment units, 30 June 1964
Unit	Location
HHC, 1st Battalion (Mechanized), 134th Infantry	Omaha
Company A (-), 1st Battalion (M), 134th Infantry	Wayne
2nd Rifle Platoon and Weapons Platoon, Company A, 1st Battalion (M), 134th Infantry	O'Neill
Company B, 1st Battalion, (M), 134th Infantry	Norfolk
Company C, 1st Battalion, (M), 134th Infantry	Columbus
HHC, 2nd Battalion (M), 134th Infantry	Beatrice
Company A, 2nd Battalion (M), 134th Infantry	Nebraska City
Company B (-), 2nd Battalion (M), 134th Infantry	Auburn
2nd Rifle Platoon and Weapons Platoon, Company B, 2nd Battalion (M), 134th Infantry	Falls City
Company C (-), 2nd Battalion (M), 134th Infantry	Seward
2nd Rifle Platoon and Weapons Platoon, Company C, 2nd Battalion (M), 134th Infantry	Fairbury

The brigade's armored reconnaissance troop was Troop E, 167th Cavalry, converted from the Fremont-based elements of the 167th Quartermaster Company. The 67th Support Battalion and the 867th Engineer Company replaced the 167th Quartermaster Company and the western Iowa 2nd Battalion, 133rd Infantry was attached to the brigade. The brigade was selected to be part of the Selected Reserve Force (SRF), which allowed it to be brought to full strength, in October 1965. The 1968 reduction of the National Guard resulted in the brigade becoming an all-Nebraska unit once again, with the 128th Engineer Battalion and the 2nd Howitzer Battalion, 168th Artillery being eliminated to form the new 1st Battalion, 168th Artillery and 1st Battalion, 195th Armor. The 1-168th Artillery was the brigade's direct support artillery battalion, while the 1-195th Armor was officially a nondivisional unit but often trained with the 67th Brigade. The 1-195th Armor was assigned to the brigade on 1 November 1978. The brigade was assigned as a "round out" brigade to the 4th Infantry Division; in the event of conflict, the 67th Brigade would have come under the command of the division as one of its organic brigades. The 67th trained annually with the 4th Infantry Division at Fort Carson, Colorado.

==== Post-Cold War ====
The Nebraska Army National Guard saw another reorganization beginning in 1994 which eliminated the 2nd Battalion, 134th Infantry, causing a reduction of 820 positions in units in Lincoln, Nebraska City, Falls City, Auburn, Beatrice, Crete, and Hastings. In addition, the 1st Battalion, 168th Field Artillery (605 positions in Scottsbluff, Sidney, Gering, Ogallala, Alliance, North Platte, Broken Bow, and Chadron), Detachment 1 of the 1267th Medical Company (39 positions in Lincoln), and the 734th Transportation Detachment (7 positions in Lincoln) were eliminated. Previously-announced cutbacks also included the inactivation of the Lincoln-based 105th Personnel Services Company (32), the Ashland-based 134th Infantry Detachment (Long Range Surveillance) (66), and a reduction of five positions in Lincoln's 111th Public Affairs Detachment. Soldiers affected by the reorganization were given the opportunity to transfer to new units. In place of the inactivated units and cutbacks, totaling 1,613, the Nebraska Army National Guard planned to add an engineer battalion (440 positions), a troop to the 167th Cavalry (125 positions), and various combat support and service support units (410 positions), for a net decrease of 103.

=== 21st century ===
Troop B, 1st Squadron, 134th Cavalry relocated from the closed Fremont Armory to the new Titan Readiness Center near Mead in 2014. On 1 September 2017, the squadron became the cavalry squadron of the 39th Infantry Brigade Combat Team of the Arkansas Army National Guard as the 67th Battlefield Surveillance Brigade converted to a maneuver enhancement brigade. Company D, 39th Brigade Support Battalion at Lincoln was activated in 2016 as the squadron forward support company under the same reorganization.

=== 134th Infantry Regiment (Airborne) ===
The 2nd Battalion, 134th Infantry Regiment (Airborne) was activated in the Nebraska National Guard in November 2019, but under United States Army Center of Military History regulations, is a new unit and does not perpetuate the lineage of the previous iteration of the 134th Infantry Regiment, only sharing its name.

== Lineage ==
- Organized in 1855 in the Nebraska Territorial Militia from existing units as the 1st and 2d Regiments
- Reorganized in part as the 1st Regiment, Nebraska Volunteer Infantry, and mustered into federal service 11 June-21 July 1861 at Omaha
- Converted and redesignated 5 November 1863 as the 1st Nebraska Cavalry
- Consolidated 18 July 1865 with the 1st Battalion, Nebraska Veteran Cavalry (see Annex 1) and consolidated unit reorganized and redesignated as the 1st Nebraska Cavalry Veteran Volunteers
- Mustered out of federal service 1 July 1866 at Omaha
- Reorganized 1867–1875 in the Nebraska State Militia as independent companies
- Companies consolidated to form the 1st Regiment of Mounted Infantry (organized 1875–1876) and the 2nd Regiment of Infantry (organized 1878–1879)
- (Nebraska State Militia redesignated in 1881 as the Nebraska National Guard)
- 1st Regiment of Mounted Infantry and the 2nd Regiment of Infantry consolidated 13 July 1881 to form the 1st Regiment
- Mustered into federal service 9–10 May 1898 at Lincoln as the 1st Nebraska Volunteer Infantry; mustered out of federal service 23 August 1899 at San Francisco, California
- Reorganized 11 June 1900 in the Nebraska National Guard as the 1st Infantry Regiment
- Consolidated 1 April 1913 with the 2d Infantry Regiment (see Annex 2) and reorganized as the 4th and 5th infantry Regiments
- 4th and 5th Infantry Regiments mustered into federal service 3 July 1916; mustered out of Federal service 21 February 1917
- Drafted into federal service 5 August 1917
- 4th Infantry Regiment converted and redesignated 1 October 1917 as the 127th Field Artillery and assigned to the 34th Division; demobilized 18 February 1919 at Camp Grant, Illinois
- 5th Infantry Regiment reorganized and redesignated 1 October 1917 as the 134th Infantry and assigned to the 34th Division; demobilized 18 February 1919 at Camp Grant, Illinois
- Nebraska National Guard infantry regiment reorganized as provisional companies, 1920–1921
- Provisional companies reorganized and redesignated 1 July 1921 as the 1st Infantry Regiment; headquarters organized 7 July 1921 at Omaha
- Redesignated 25 October 1921 as the 134th Infantry and assigned to the 35th Division;
- Inducted into federal service 23 December 1940 at home stations
- Inactivated 21 November 1945 at Camp Breckinridge, Kentucky
- Relieved 19 June 1946 from assignment to the 35th Infantry Division and assigned to the 34th Infantry Division
- Reorganized 17 October 1946 with headquarters at Omaha
- Reorganized 1 May 1959 as a parent regiment under the Combat Arms Regimental System to consist of the 1st and 2d Battle Groups, elements of the 34th Infantry Division
- Reorganized 1 April 1963 to consist of the 1st and 2d Battalions, elements of the 67th Infantry Brigade
- Reorganized 1 October 1985 to consist of the 1st and 2d Battalions, elements of the 35th Infantry Division
- Withdrawn 14 December 1987 from the Combat Arms Regimental System and reorganized under the United States Army Regimental System
- Reorganized 1 September 1996 to consist of the 1st Battalion, an element of the 35th Infantry Division
- Consolidated 1 September 2003 with the 167th Cavalry (see ANNEX 3), and consolidated unit designated as the 167th Cavalry, to consist of the 1st Squadron, an element of the 35th Infantry Division
- Reorganized and redesignated 1 September 2005 as the 134th Cavalry, to consist of the 1st Squadron, and relieved from assignment to the 35th Infantry Division
- Redesignated 1 October 2005 as the 134th Cavalry Regiment
- Ordered into federal service 11 October 2005 at home stations; released from federal service 29 September 2007 and reverted to state control
- Ordered into federal service 7 December 2010 at home stations; attached to 2nd Brigade Combat Team, 34th Infantry Division; released from federal service 15 July 2011 and reverted to state control
- Reorganized 1 September 2017 as the 134th Cavalry (IBCT), to consist of the 1st Squadron, an element of the 39th Infantry Brigade Combat Team (IBCT) of the Arkansas Army National Guard

=== Annex 1 ===
- Organized and mustered into federal service 23 October 1862 – 24 March 1863 at Omaha as the 2d Nebraska Cavalry
- Mustered out of federal service 4 September-23 December 1863 at Omaha
- Reorganized and mustered into federal service 14 January 31 – August 1864 as the 1st Battalion, Nebraska Veteran Cavalry

=== Annex 2 ===
- Organized 13 August 1887 in the Nebraska National Guard as the 2d Infantry Regiment
- Mustered into federal service 9–14 May 1898 at Lincoln as the 2d Nebraska Volunteer Infantry; mustered out of federal service 24 October 1898 at Omaha
- Reorganized 6 June 1899 in the Nebraska National Guard as the 2d Infantry Regiment

=== Annex 3 ===
- Constituted 12 February 1964 in the Nebraska Army National Guard as the 167th Cavalry, a parent regiment under the Combat Arms Regimental System
- Reorganized 26 September 1985 to consist of the 1st Squadron, an element of the 35th Infantry Division
- Withdrawn 14 December 1987 from the Combat Arms Regimental System and reorganized under the United States Army Regimental System as the 167th Cavalry, to consist of the 1st Squadron
- Ordered into federal service 30 December 2002 at home stations; released from active Federal service 31 October 2003 and reverted to state control

== Distinctive unit insignia ==
=== Background ===
The distinctive unit insignia was originally approved for the 134th Infantry Regiment on 1 December 1932. On 22 August 2006, it was redesignated for the 134th Cavalry Regiment, with the description and symbolism updated.

=== Description ===
A Gold color metal and enamel device 1 1/8 inches (2.9 cm) in height overall consisting of a shield blazoned: Per chevron Azure and Argent, in chief the Katipunan sun in splendor and an olla Or charged with a bull skull Gules, in base a mound Vert a palm tree Proper entwined with a snake of the fifth. Attached below a Gold scroll inscribed "LAH WE LAH HIS" in Blue letters.

=== Symbolism ===
The shield is Argent (white) and Azure (blue), the colors of the Infantry and the original designation of the unit. The Katipunan sun represents the Philippine Insurrection, and the palm tree Spanish–American War service. The olla is made gold to comply with heraldic rules, and denotes the World War I service of the organization in the 34th Division. The snake symbolizes Mexican Border service.

== Coat of arms ==
=== Background ===
The coat of arms was originally approved for the 134th Infantry Regiment on 11 July 1938. On 22 August 2006, it was redesignated for the 134th Cavalry Regiment with the symbolism of the shield updated.

=== Blazon ===
- Shield: Per chevron Azure and Argent, in chief the Katipunan sun in splendor and an olla Or charged with a bull skull Gules, in base a mound Vert a palm tree Proper entwined with a snake of the fifth.
- Crest: That for the regiments and separate battalions of the Nebraska Army National Guard: From a wreath Argent and Azure an ear of corn in full ear partially husked Proper.
- Motto: LAH WE LAH HIS (The Strong, The Brave).

=== Symbolism ===
- Shield: The shield is Argent (white) and Azure (blue), the colors of the Infantry and the original designation of the unit. The Katipunan sun represents the Philippine Insurrection, and the palm tree Spanish–American War service. The olla is made gold to comply with heraldic rules, and denotes the World War I service of the organization in the 34th Division. The snake symbolizes the Mexican Border service.
- Crest: The crest is that of the Nebraska Army National Guard.

== Campaign streamers ==
American Indian Wars
- Pine Ridge
- Dakota 1863
- Nebraska 1864–1865
- Colorado 1865

American Civil War

- Missouri 1861–1865
- Henry and Donelson
- Mississippi River
- Shiloh
- Arkansas 1864

Spanish–American War

- Manila

Philippine–American War

- Manila
- Malolos

World War I

- Streamer without inscription

World War II

- Aleutians (2nd Battalion only)
- Normandy
- Northern France
- Rhineland
- Ardennes-Alsace
- Central Europe

War on terror

- Kuwait
- Bosnia and Herzegovina
- Iraq: Iraqi Governance (A Troop only), National Resolution, Iraqi Surge
- Afghanistan: Consolidation III

== Decorations ==
=== Regiment ===
- Army Presidential Unit Citation with streamer embroidered BASTOGNE
- French Croix de Guerre 1939-1945 with Palm, streamer embroidered ST. LO
- Army Superior Unit Award with streamer embroidered BOSNIA 2003
- Army Meritorious Unit Commendation with streamer embroidered IRAQ 2006–2007
- Army Meritorious Unit Commendation with streamer embroidered AFGHANISTAN 2010–2011

=== Active subordinate units ===
- Headquarters Troop (Yutan), 1st Squadron: Meritorious Unit Commendation with streamer embroidered EUROPEAN THEATER 1944–1945
- Troop A (Hastings), 1st Squadron
- Troop B (York), 1st Squadron
- Troop C (Beatrice), 1st Squadron: Presidential Unit Citation with streamer embroidered HABKIRCHEN
