= 1st Battalion, 168th Field Artillery Regiment (Nebraska National Guard) =

The 1st Battalion, 168th Field Artillery (1-168 FA) was a field artillery battalion of the Nebraska Army National Guard during the Cold War. It served as the direct support artillery battalion of the 67th Infantry Brigade from 1968 and continued in that role when the 67th Brigade became part of the reactivated 35th Infantry Division in 1985. The battalion was inactivated in 1997 due to the conversion of the 67th Brigade into a support group. Its subordinate units were mostly converted into support units while the battalion headquarters was converted into the 168th Quartermaster Battalion headquarters, which perpetuated its lineage.

The lineage of the 168th Field Artillery parent regiment began with the 1946 formation of the 3rd Battalion, 134th Infantry when the Nebraska National Guard reorganized after the end of World War II. It was converted to field artillery in 1959, with the 1st and 2nd Howitzer Battalions of the 168th Artillery serving as divisional artillery battalions of the 34th Infantry Division. When the 34th Infantry Division was eliminated in 1963, the 1st Howitzer Battalion became a non-divisional unit and the 2nd Howitzer Battalion became the direct support artillery battalion of the 67th Infantry Brigade. Under the 1968 reorganization, the 1st Battalion, 168th Artillery was formed from elements of both howitzer battalions, with its units in rural western Nebraska and the Nebraska Panhandle.

== History ==
When the Nebraska National Guard was reorganized after World War II, the 3rd Battalion of the 134th Infantry Regiment was organized and Federally recognized on 4 December 1946 with headquarters and headquarters company at North Platte. The 134th Infantry was the regiment of the 34th Infantry Division from Nebraska, which included Iowa and Nebraska National Guard units. The 3rd Battalion, located in rural western Nebraska, included four of the twelve lettered companies of the 134th Infantry: Company I (Scottsbluff), Company K (Sidney), Company L (Alliance), and Company M (North Platte). Company M was the first to be federally recognized on 5 May 1947, with I following in August and K and L in October of that year.

Under the Pentomic reorganization of the Army National Guard on 1 May 1959, 3rd Battalion, 134th Infantry was broken up, its lineage continued by the 168th Artillery, a parent regiment under the Combat Arms Regimental System. The North Platte-based 3rd Battalion headquarters company and Company M became Companies E and D of the 128th Engineer Battalion, respectively. The 568th Field Artillery Battalion of the 34th Infantry Division had been the only field artillery unit in the Nebraska Army National Guard, but was eliminated under the reorganization. The 1st and 2nd Howitzer Battalions of the 168th Artillery were formed as part of the 34th Infantry Division Artillery. 1-168 included Headquarters and Service Battery at Scottsbluff, converted from Company I, Battery A at Chadron, converted from Company D of the 128th Engineer Battalion, and Battery B at Gering, converted from the Tank Company of the 134th Infantry. 2-168 included Headquarters and Service Battery at Ogallala, converted from the Heavy Mortar Company of the 134th, Battery A at Alliance, converted from Company L, and Battery B at Sidney, converted from Company K.

When the 34th Infantry Division was eliminated in the 1 April 1963 Reorganization Objective Army Division restructuring, 1-168 became a separate non-divisional unit and 2-168 became the direct support battalion of the 67th Infantry Brigade, formed from Nebraska units of the 34th. 1-168 was equipped with 155 mm self-propelled howitzers with Headquarters and Headquarters Battery (HHB) reorganized from the Scottsbluff battery, Battery B at Sidney, Battery C at Alliance, and Service Battery at Gering. 2-168 was equipped with 105 mm self-propelled howitzers with Headquarters and Headquarters and Service Batteries at North Platte, Battery A at Ogallala, Battery B at Lexington, and Battery C at Broken Bow.

The 1st Battalion, 168th Artillery was formed as the direct support battalion of the 67th Infantry Brigade under the 1 May 1968 reorganization of the Nebraska Army National Guard. HHB was at Scottsbluff with elements at Sidney, Service Battery at Gering, Battery A at Ogallala, Battery B at North Platte, and Battery C at Chadron with elements at Alliance. 1-168 FA continued in this role when the brigade became part of the reformed 35th Infantry Division as the 67th Brigade on 1 October 1985. The battalion was subordinate to the 35th Infantry Division Artillery headquarters. Under this reorganization, Broken Bow returned to the battalion when its Company C, 1st Battalion, 195th Armor became a detachment of one of the 1-168 FA batteries.

By 1990, the battalion was equipped with the M109A2 self-propelled howitzer and included about 400 members. The battalion conducted its two weeks of annual training at Camp Guernsey, Wyoming. It became the first battalion of the 35th Division Artillery to receive upgraded M109A5 howitzers in 1995.

The battalion was inactivated on 30 September 1997 due to the conversion of the 67th Brigade into a support group. Its subordinate units were mostly converted into support units while the battalion headquarters was converted into the 168th Quartermaster Battalion headquarters, which perpetuated its lineage. Under the reorganization, Scottsbluff also gained a medical section of the 1st Battalion, 195th Armor and a maintenance section of the 67th Support Battalion, while Alliance, formerly the site of Detachment 1, Battery A, lost its National Guard presence with the closure of its armory. Battery A at Sidney became a mortar platoon of the 1st Battalion, 134th Infantry. Battery C at Chadron became the 1057th Transportation Company with platoons in Scottsbluff and Omaha. Service Battery at Gering became a company of the 1st Battalion, 195th Armor. The Scottsbluff-based Headquarters and Headquarters Detachment, 168th Quartermaster Battalion (Petroleum Supply) was inactivated in 2012.

== Heraldry ==
The design of the regimental distinctive unit insignia was approved on 17 September 1969, containing the motto Enforcers of Democracy. The blue portion and fleur-de-lis symbolize the Presidential Unit Citation and Croix de Guerre awarded to the 134th Infantry Regiment for the Battle of Saint-Lô and the Siege of Bastogne during World War II, inherited by elements of the battalion. The vertical pallets depict stylized gun barrels, representing the artillery role of the unit.
