= Butler B. Miltonberger =

United States Army general

Butler Buchanan Miltonberger
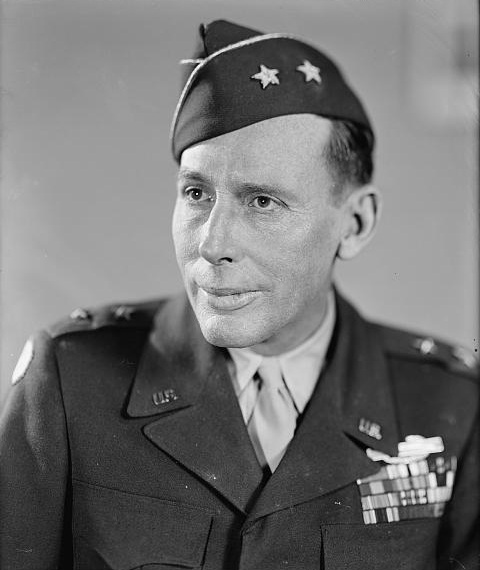
- Miltonberger as a major general.
- Born: August 31, 1897; North Platte, Nebraska, U.S.
- Died: March 23, 1977 (aged 79); North Platte, Nebraska, U.S.
- Burial place: Fort McPherson National Cemetery
- Military career
- Allegiance: United States of America
- Branch: United States Army
- Service years: 1916–1919; 1923–1947
- Rank: Major general
- Nickname: Butts
- Unit: Nebraska Army National Guard
- Commands: 134th Infantry Regiment; Chief of the National Guard Bureau
- Conflicts: Mexican Border Campaign; World War I; Meuse-Argonne; World War II; Normandy; Northern France; Rhineland; Ardennes-Alsace; Central Europe
- Awards: Distinguished Service Medal; Silver Star; Legion of Merit (2); Bronze Star Medal (3)

Butler Buchanan Miltonberger (August 31, 1897 – March 23, 1977) was a United States Army major general who served as the first post-World War II Chief of the National Guard Bureau from 1946 to 1947.

== Early years ==
Butler Buchanan Miltonberger was born in North Platte, Nebraska, on August 31, 1897, the son of Ira L. Miltonberger and Jennie Buchanan Miltonberger. He graduated from North Platte High School in spring 1916 and enlisted in Company E of the 5th Infantry Regiment, Nebraska National Guard on June 25, 1916. He was mustered into federal service during the Mexican Border Campaign from July 2, 1916, to February 21, 1917, becoming a sergeant. After his unit returned to Nebraska, he continued in service with the Nebraska National Guard.

== World War I ==
After American entry into World War I on April 6, 1917, Miltonberger and his unit were called into federal service on July 15 and drafted on August 5. The 5th Nebraska was redesignated the 134th Infantry Regiment, part of the 34th Division. The 34th Division was stripped of personnel repeatedly while training at Camp Cody, New Mexico, in order to provide replacements for other American Expeditionary Forces units fighting in France, but Miltonberger sailed overseas with his unit in October 1918; it was subsequently broken up to provide replacements upon arrival in France, and Miltonberger was assigned to the 4th Division immediately before the armistice. He attained the rank of first sergeant before being honorably discharged on August 6, 1919.

== Post World War I ==
On May 12, 1923, Miltonberger reenlisted in the Nebraska National Guard in North Platte and was commissioned a first lieutenant in Company D, 134th Infantry Regiment, 35th Division. He was promoted to captain on November 10, 1923, as commander of Company D. Miltonberger was promoted to major and commander of the 1st Battalion, 134th Infantry Regiment on January 14, 1933. In June 1935, his unit was mobilized by Nebraska Governor Robert Leroy Cochran and sent to Omaha in response to civil disturbances stemming from an ongoing dispute between labor and management of the Omaha Traction Company. In January 1939, he single-handedly captured Willard Brucks, an escaped killer from Ohio who had broken into the Omaha armory to seize weapons. Miltonberger was promoted to lieutenant colonel on October 7, 1940.

In the peacetime period between World Wars I and II, his units usually trained one night a week at their local armories and for two weeks every summer at Camp Ashland, Nebraska. Large U.S. Army maneuvers in which the 35th Division took part were held at Camp Funston, Fort Riley, Kansas, in 1937, and at Camp Ripley, Minnesota, in 1940. On December 23, 1940, the 35th Division was mobilized for one year of federal service by President Franklin D. Roosevelt, and took part in the Louisiana Maneuvers in August and September 1941.

In his civilian capacity, Miltonberger worked in North Platte as a postman, and was also employed in road and bridge surveying and construction.

== World War II ==
Miltonberger was made acting commander of the 134th Infantry in May 1941, after the relief of Colonel Clyde E. McCormick, its previous commander. Immediately before U.S. entry into World War II, Miltonberger was promoted to full colonel as commander of the regiment on November 10, 1941. In 1944 and 1945, led his regiment throughout France, Belgium, Germany, and the Netherlands, including at Saint-Lô, across the Vire River and through Mortain, the liberation of Nancy, the Moselle River, Morhange, Sarreguemines, and at Bastogne during the Battle of the Bulge.

In February 1945, Miltonberger was promoted to brigadier general and assigned as assistant division commander of Major General Paul W. Baade's 35th Infantry Division, replacing Brigadier General Edmund B. Sebree. By the end of the war in Europe, the 35th Infantry Division reached the Elbe River in Germany. In November 1945, he returned to the United States and remained on active duty at the War Department.

== Chief of National Guard Bureau ==
In January 1946, President Harry S. Truman, a fellow veteran of the 35th Infantry Division, nominated Miltonberger to be the first post-war Chief of the National Guard Bureau as a major general. As Chief, Miltonberger worked to reorganize the National Guard following its demobilization after World War II, including the formation of the new Air National Guard. Miltonberger became ill and entered the hospital in February 1947, and he was retired from active duty military service in September for disability after being diagnosed with chronic sarcoidosis of the lungs.

== Later career ==
After his retirement, Miltonberger returned to Nebraska. He resided in North Platte and Lincoln, and was employed by the Nebraska State Engineer.

In 1950, he became Chairman of the "Miltonberger Board", which consisted of current and former National Guard officers and was empowered to review the National Guard's organizational structure, internal policies and operational procedures, and make recommendations for long term improvements.

== Death and burial ==
Miltonberger, who had been ill with emphysema, died in North Platte on March 23, 1977, at the age of 79 after suffering complications from surgery to repair a broken hip suffered in a fall. He was survived by his second wife, Caroline, two daughters, Helen and Veatrice, and a son, Butler. Jr. He is buried at Fort McPherson National Cemetery near Maxwell, Nebraska.

== Awards and decorations ==
Miltonberger's awards included the Distinguished Service Medal, Silver Star, Legion of Merit, Bronze Star Medal, the French Croix de Guerre, the Netherlands Order of Orange-Nassau, the Luxembourg War Cross and the Combat Infantryman Badge.

Combat Infantryman Badge
Army Distinguished Service Medal		Silver Star	Legion of Merit with Oak Leaf Cluster
Bronze Star with two Oak Leaf Clusters	Mexican Border Service Medal	World War I Victory Medal w/ Battle Clasp	Army of Occupation of Germany Medal
American Defense Service Medal	American Campaign Medal	European-African-Middle Eastern Campaign Medal with five campaign stars	World War II Victory Medal
Army of Occupation Medal with Germany Clasp	Chevalier of the Legion of Honour	French Croix de guerre 1939–1945 with Palm	Officer of the Order of Orange-Nassau with Swords

Military offices
Preceded by John F. Williams	Chief of the National Guard Bureau; 1946−1947	Succeeded by Kenneth F. Cramer
