= Hubert Allison Allen =

American general who served during World War I

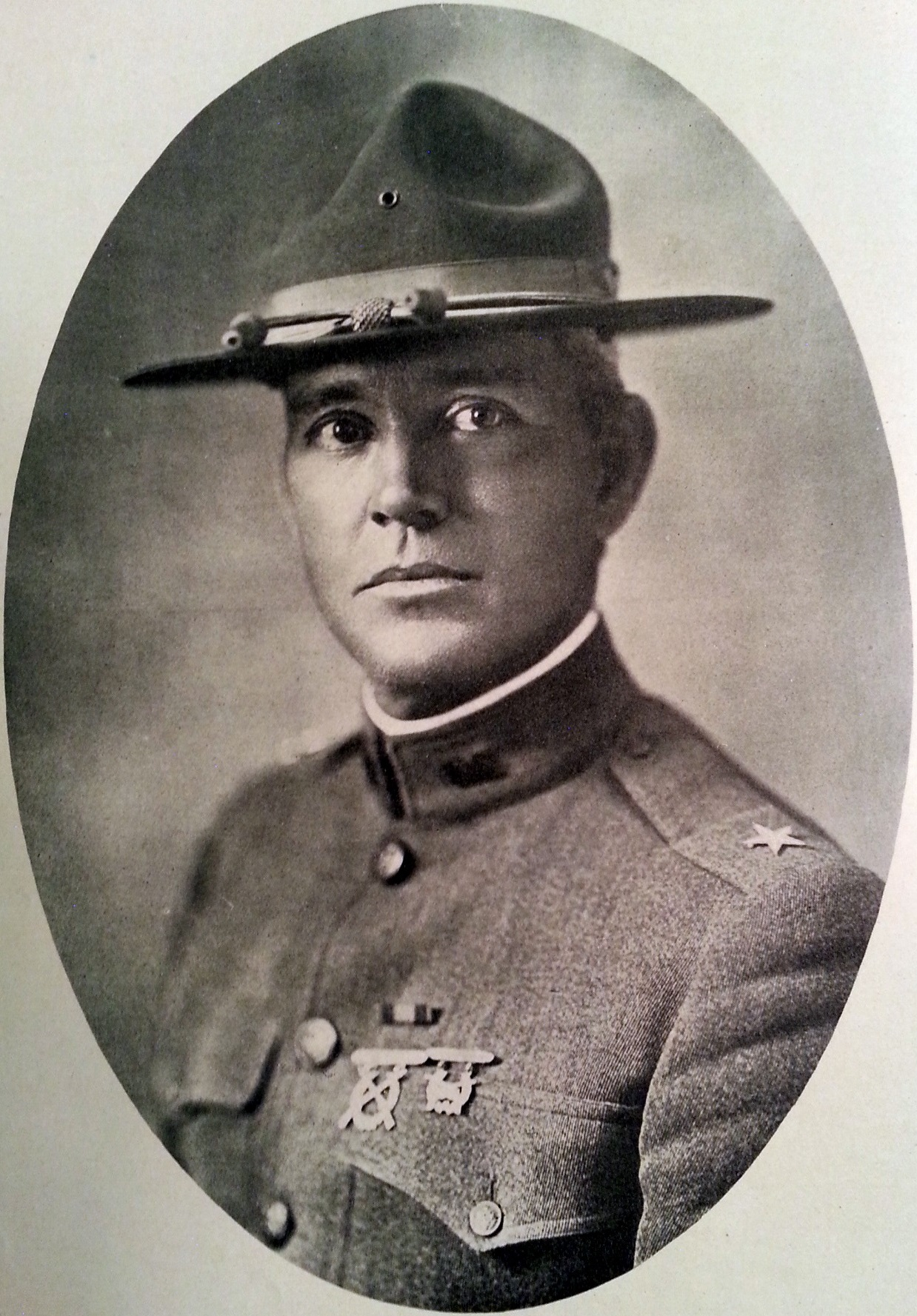
- from 1919's Honor Roll of Linn County, Iowa
- Born: April 4, 1872; Independence, Iowa, U.S.
- Died: May 14, 1942 (aged 70); Portland, Oregon, U.S.
- Burial place: Fort Vancouver Military Cemetery
- Spouse: Jessie Mainus (M. 1892)
- Children: 2
- Military career
- Allegiance: United States
- Branch: Iowa National Guard; United States Army
- Service years: 1898–1935
- Rank: Brigadier General
- Service number: 0-672
- Commands: 34th Division; 67th Brigade; 56th Brigade; 14th Regiment
- Conflicts: Spanish–American War; United States Military Government in Cuba; Pancho Villa Expedition; World War I
- Other work: Manager, Iowa Telephone Company

Hubert Allison Allen (April 4, 1872 – May 14, 1942) was an American general who served during World War I. He is strongly associated with the Iowa National Guard.

== Early life ==
Allen was born in Independence, Buchanan County, Iowa, the son of Joel Oliver Allen and Mary Jane (McGary) Allen. He graduated from Iowa State College in Ames, Iowa in 1892.

== Military career ==
On April 26, 1898 Allen enlisted with the 49th Iowa Volunteer Infantry. He served in Havana, Cuba from December 19, 1898 to April 1899 where he took the surrender of and occupied the forts guarding Havana. While in Cuba, he was twice the provost-marshal of the Seventh Army Corps. In Savannah, Georgia, Allen was honorably discharged as a captain on May 13, 1899.

For twenty-five years, he was actively identified with the Iowa National Guard. On June 26, 1915, he was made brigadier general, Iowa National Guard, for service on the Mexican border. On August 4, 1917 he was promoted to brigadier general (National Army) and given command of the 67th Infantry Brigade, 34th Division, at Camp Cody, in New Mexico. Allen was acting commander of the 34th Division in December 1917 and from August to October 1918.

He also served in France from September 15, 1918 to April 30, 1919, where he graduated from the general officer school in Langres. He also commanded the 56th Infantry Brigade, 28th Infantry Division, of the Pennsylvania National Guard troops while in France.

Allen was discharged as a brigadier general (National Army) on May 15, 1919, but was then commissioned a colonel. After coming back from France, he had two years of duty in the Philippines commanding a regiment of Philippine Scouts and was sent to Panama to command the 14th Infantry. After returning to the United States, he served as a senior instructor to the Oregon National Guard until his retirement on September 30, 1935.

== Civilian career ==
In his civilian life, he was the manager of the Iowa Telephone Company.

== Community and political involvement ==
Allen belonged to the United Spanish War Veterans, the Knights of Pythias, the Masons, and was a Republican.

Allen served as a Vice President in the Iowa Rifle Association in 1914.

== Death and legacy ==
Hubert Allison Allen died in Portland, Oregon on May 15, 1942.

His papers are held by Lewis & Clark College Aubrey Watzek Library Archives & Special Collections, Portland, Oregon.

== Bibliography ==
- Davis, Henry Blaine Jr. Generals in Khaki. Raleigh, NC: Pentland Press, 1998. ISBN 1571970886 OCLC 231779136
- Marquis Who's Who, Inc. Who Was Who in American History, the Military. Chicago: Marquis Who's Who, 1975. ISBN 0837932017 OCLC 657162692
