= Nebraska Army National Guard =

Component of the US Army and military of the U.S. state of Nebraska

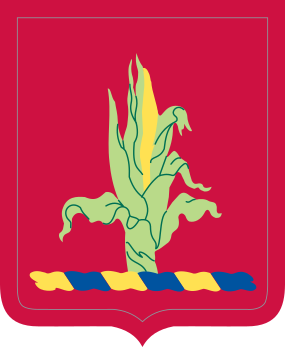
- Nebraska ARNG STARC SSI
- Active: 23 December 1854 – present
- Country: United States
- Allegiance: Nebraska
- Branch: United States Army
- Role: United States Army National Guard
- Part of: Nebraska Military Department
- Garrison/HQ: Lincoln, Nebraska
- Website: https://ne.ng.mil/

Commanders
- Commander-in-Chief: President Donald Trump
- Governor of the State of Nebraska: Governor Jim Pillen
- The Adjutant General Director, Nebraska Military Department: MG Craig W. Strong

Insignia
- Nebraska Army National Guard Crest

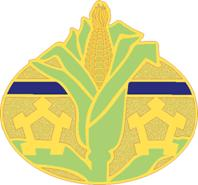
- Nebraska ARNG STARC DUI

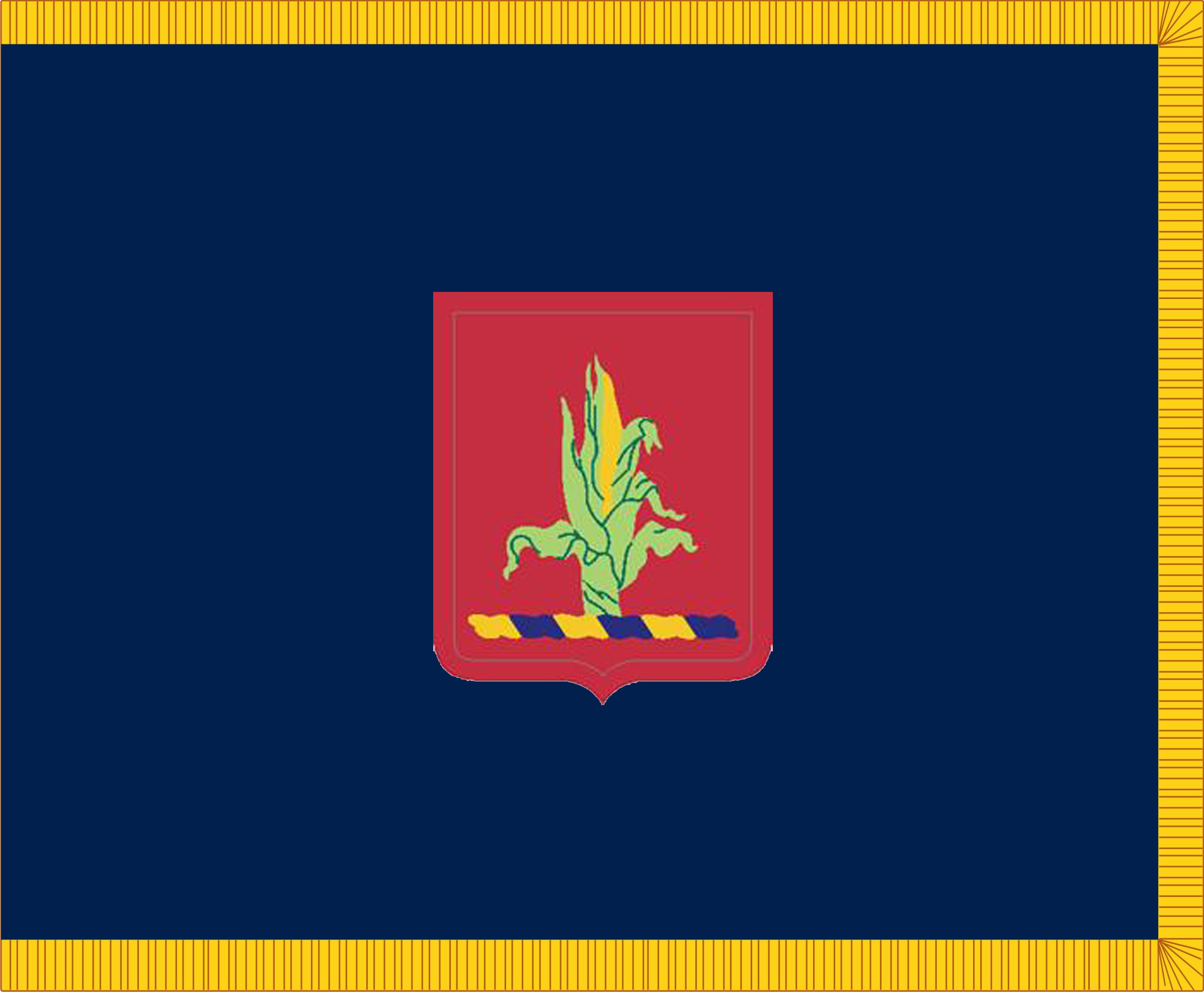
- Nebraska Army National Guard Headquarters Flag

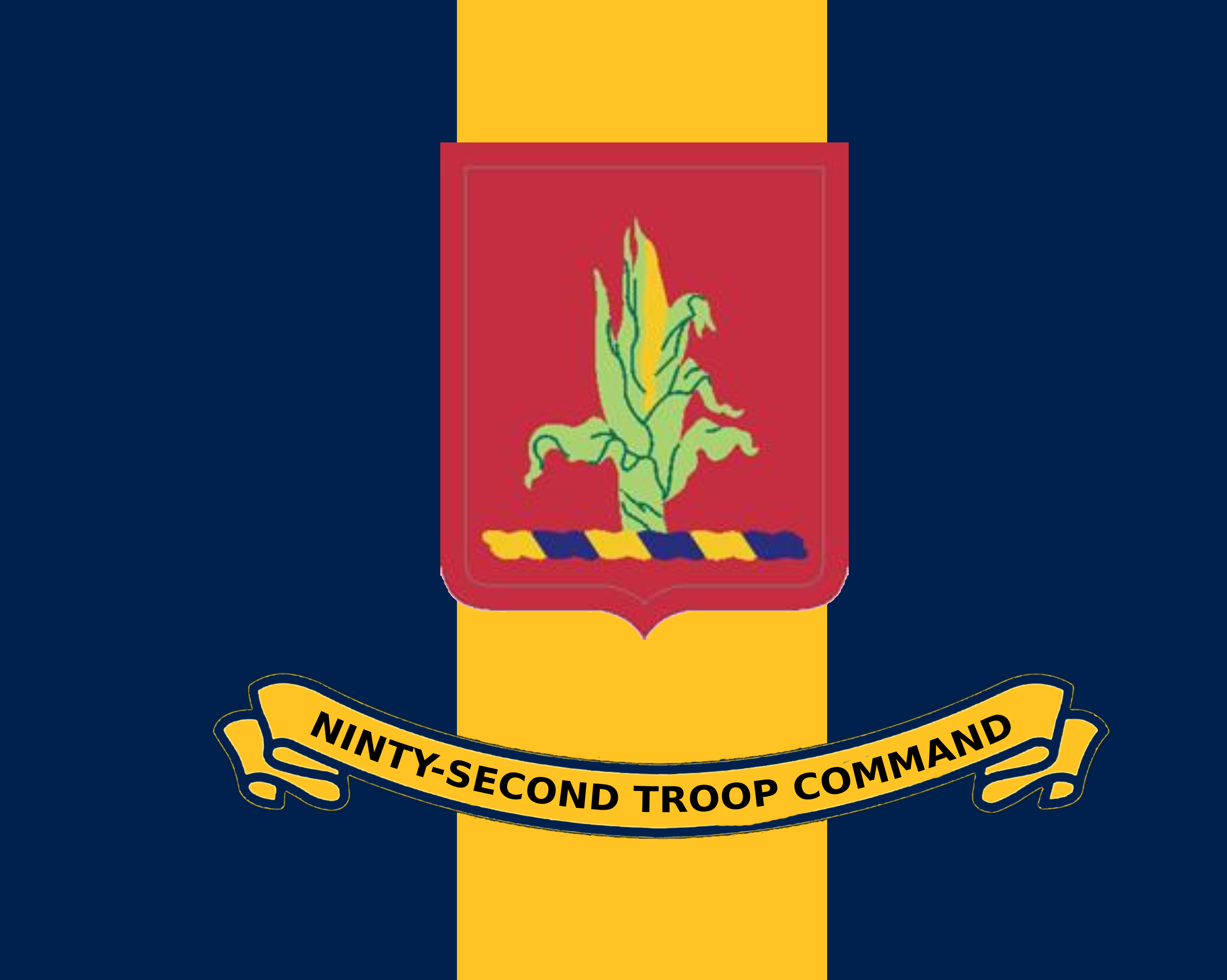
- Nebraska Army National Guard 92nd Troop Command Flag

The Nebraska Army National Guard is a group of Army National Guard units in the U.S. state of Nebraska. The Adjutant General for these units is Major General Craig W. Strong, who assumed his new duties in July 2023.

The state's longtime 67th Infantry Brigade was reorganized in 2003 as the 67th Area Support Group. The brigade was again converted and reorganized in 2008 as the 67th Battlefield Surveillance Brigade. The brigade converted and reorganized again in 2016 as the 67th Maneuver Enhancement Brigade (MEB).

== History ==
The Nebraska Army National Guard traces its roots to its territorial militia, which was established on December 23, 1854. When it was founded, Nebraska had become a hotspot of unrest and tensions, as its southern neighbor Kansas became embroiled in a civil conflict known as Bleeding Kansas which would later be recognized as the prelude to the American Civil War. Although Nebraska itself was spared from the sectarian violence, its own origins began with a dispute between Mormon settlers in Nebraska and the native Sioux inhabitants of the region, which itself began when a cow owned by the Mormons wandered into Sioux territory and was killed. The Mormons attempted to attack the Sioux after they denied any wrongdoing, which triggered the Grattan massacre. As a result, on Dec. 23, 1854, then acting governor Thomas Cuming of Nebraska established the Nebraska Territorial Militia, the predecessor to the Nebraska National Guard. The Nebraska Territorial Militia fought in its first conflict during the American Civil War, during which it supplied two volunteer militia units. However, when Nebraska achieved statehood in 1867, the new state did not bother to formally retain a state militia and instead relied on loosely organized, independent ones until 1881 due to costs and expenses. In 1881, the Nebraska Territorial Militia was reorganized into the Nebraska National Guard, and played a role in civil peacekeeping operations, waging conflicts against Native American tribes and being deployed internationally for the first time during the Spanish American War.

== Adjutants General of Nebraska ==
The position of adjutant general was created by the Nebraska Territorial Legislature as a part-time position in 1864. It was made a full-time position in 1869. In 1871, the position was abolished, with its duties becoming an additional responsibility of the Secretary of State. The position was recreated as a full-time position when the state adopted a new military code in 1881.

- Craig W. Strong, 2023–present
- Daryl L. Bohac, 2013–2023
- Judd H. Lyons, 2009-2013
- Timothy J. Kadavy, 2007-2009
- Roger P. Lempke, 2000-2007
- Stanley M. Heng, 1987-2000
- James Carmona, 1983-1987
- Edward C. Binder, 1978-1983
- Francis L. Winner, 1973-1977
- Lyle A. Welch, 1959-1973
- Guy N. Henninger, 1939-1959
- Herbert J. Paul, 1919-1939
- Joseph A. Storch, 1919
- Hugh E. Clapp, 1917-1919
- Walter E. Steele, 1917
- Philip L. Hall, 1913-1917
- Ernest H. Phelps, 1911-1913
- John C. Hartigan, 1909-1911
- Charles F. Schwarz, 1907-1909
- Jacob H. Culver, 1903-1907
- Leonard W. Colby, 1901-1903
- Julius N. Kilian, 1901
- Patrick H. Barry, 1895-1900
- James D. Gage, 1893-1895
- Victor Vifquain, 1891-1892
- Albert V. Cole, 1887-1890
- Cyrus N. Baird, 1886-1887
- John C. Bonnell, 1885-1886
- Edward P. Roggen, 1883-1885
- Samuel J. Alexander, 1879-1882
- Bruno Tzschuck, 1875-1879
- John R. Patrick, 1867-1871
- Robert S. Knox, 1865-1867
- William H.W. Hughes, 1864-1865

== Organization ==
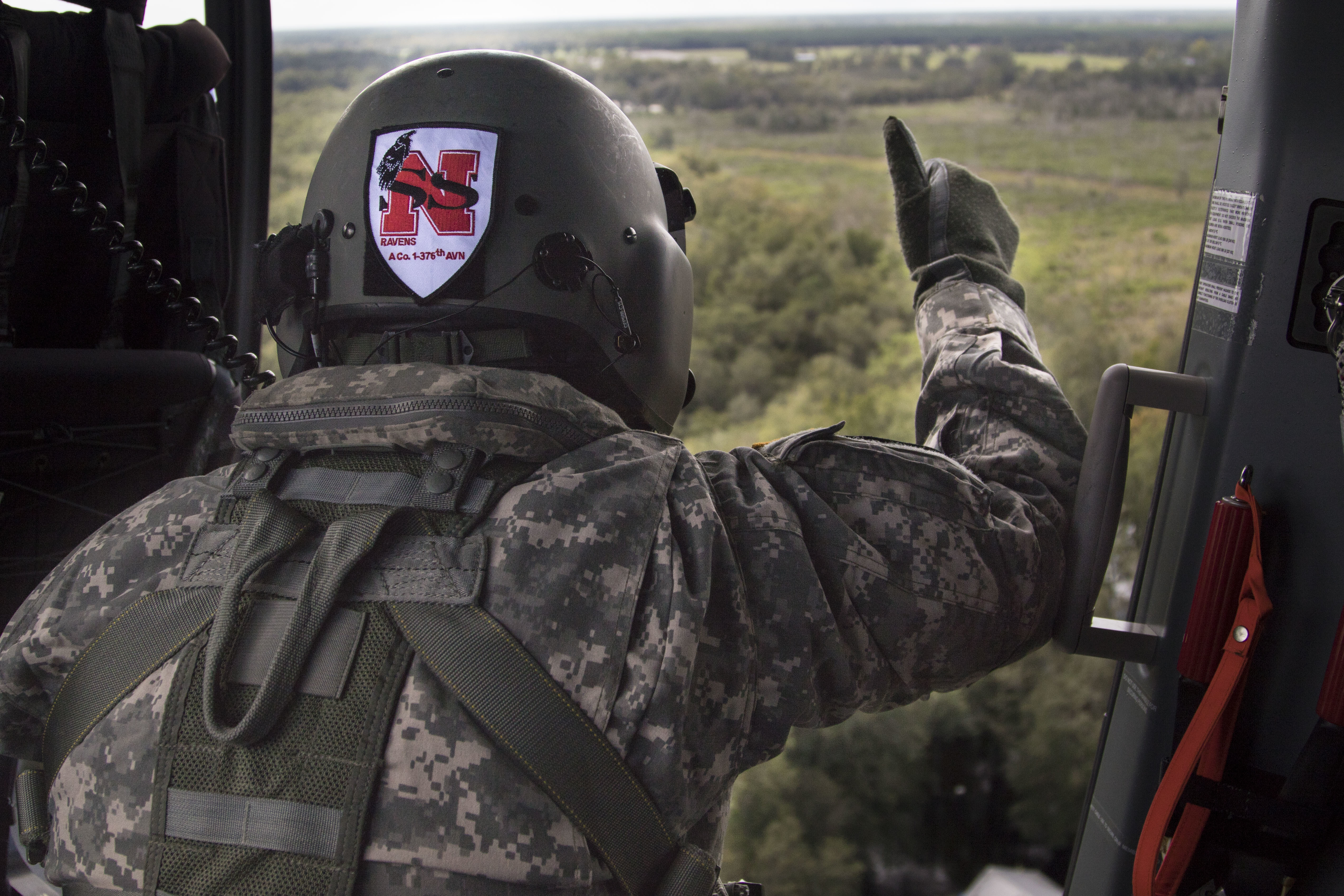
A Nebraska Army National Guardsman returns a thumbs up to civilians on the ground during a rescue operation following Hurricane Irma

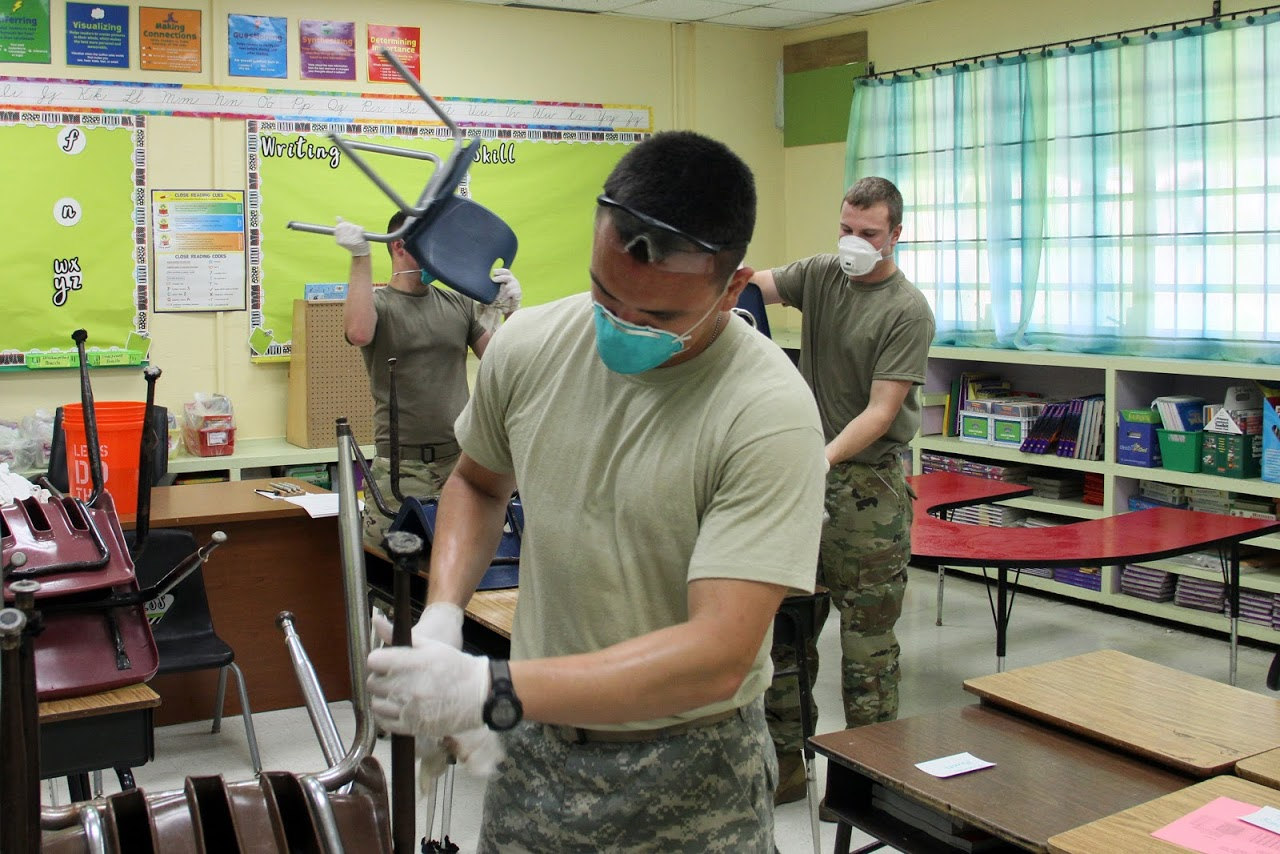
Nebraska Army National Guardsmen in the US Virgin Islands assisting in hurricane recovery efforts

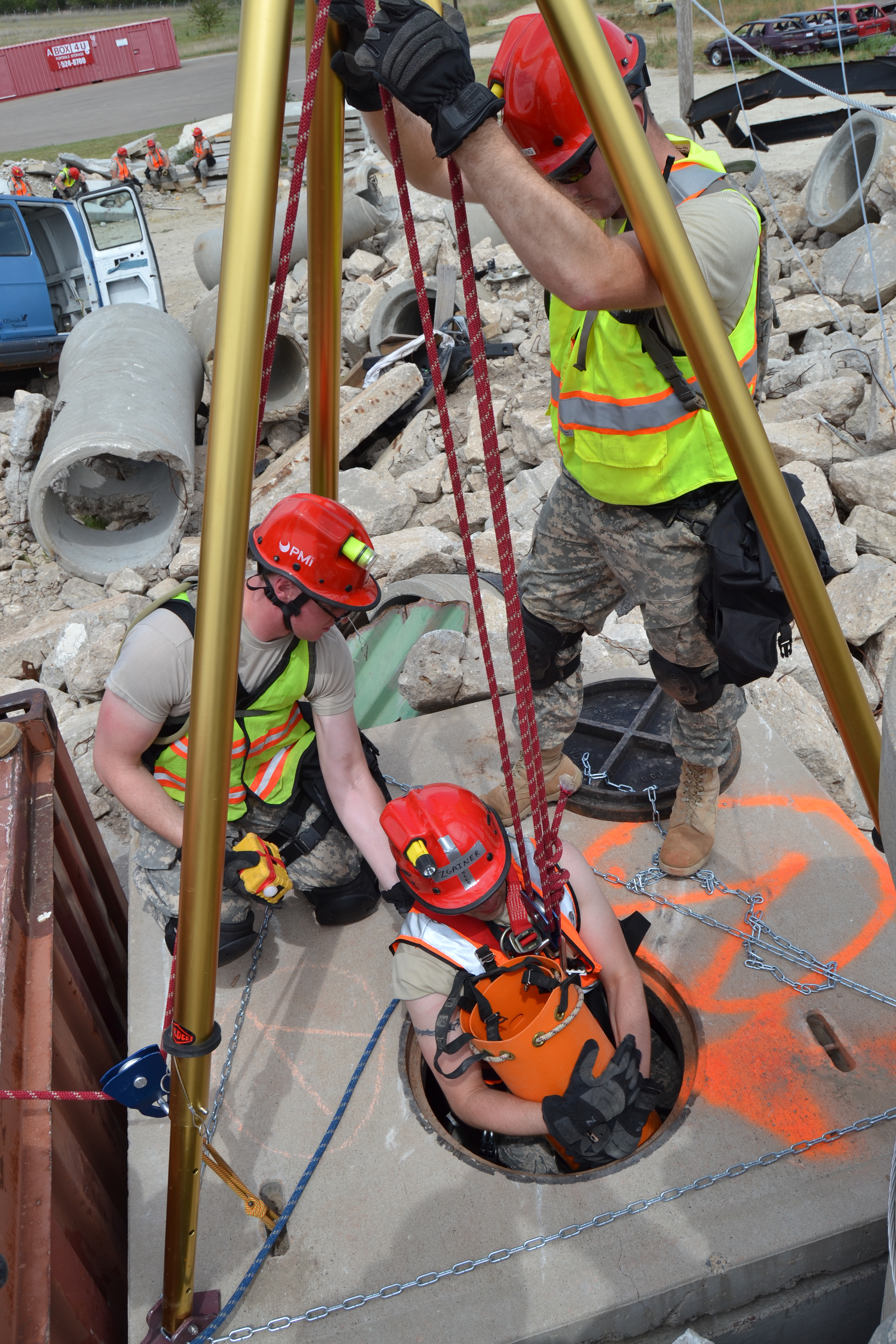
Members of the 623rd Engineer Company (Vertical), Nebraska Army National Guard during confined space training

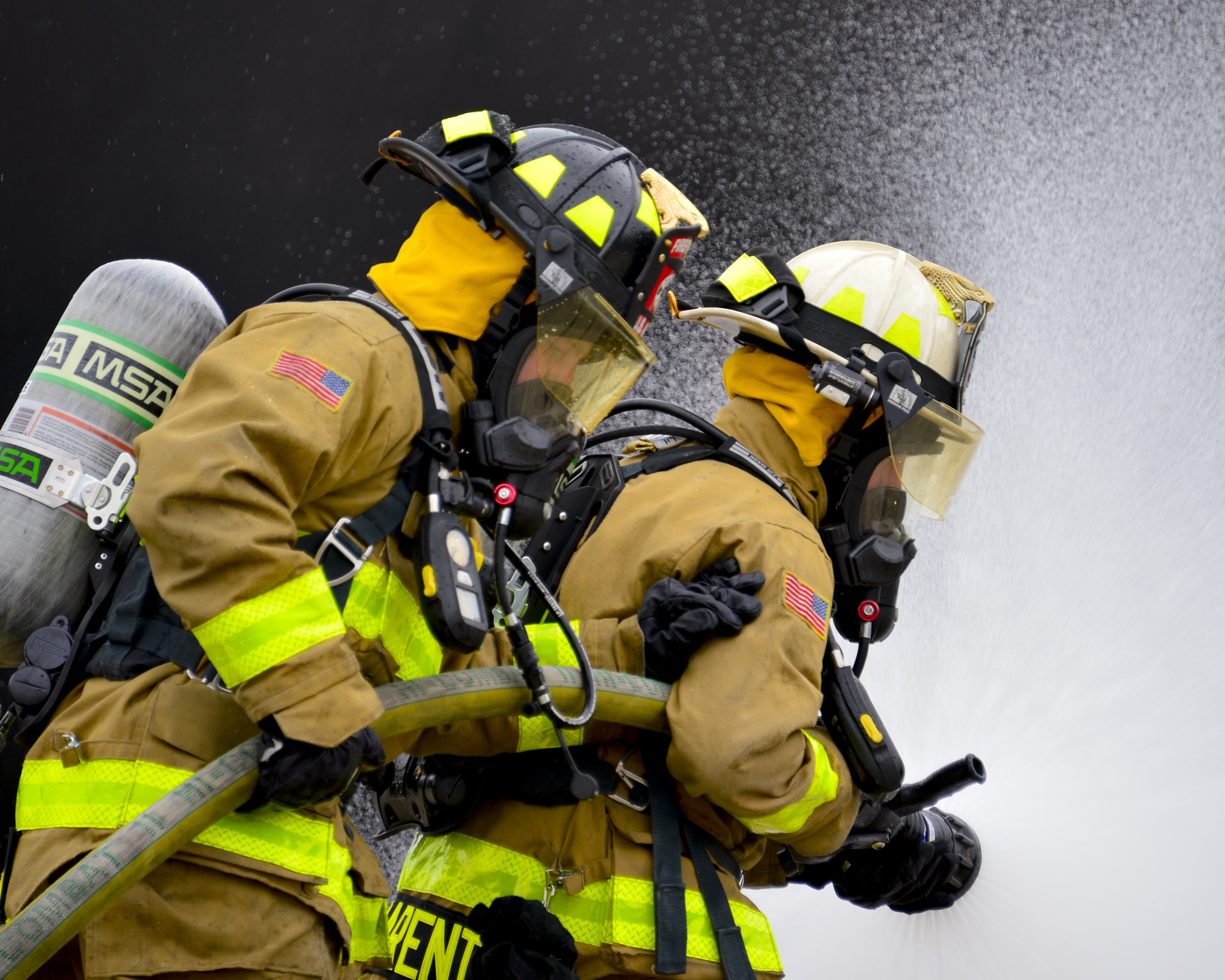
Firefighters from the 181st and the 317th Engineer Detachments, Nebraska Army National Guard, spray water during an aircraft rescue and firefighting burn as they prepare for the annual PATRIOT Exercise

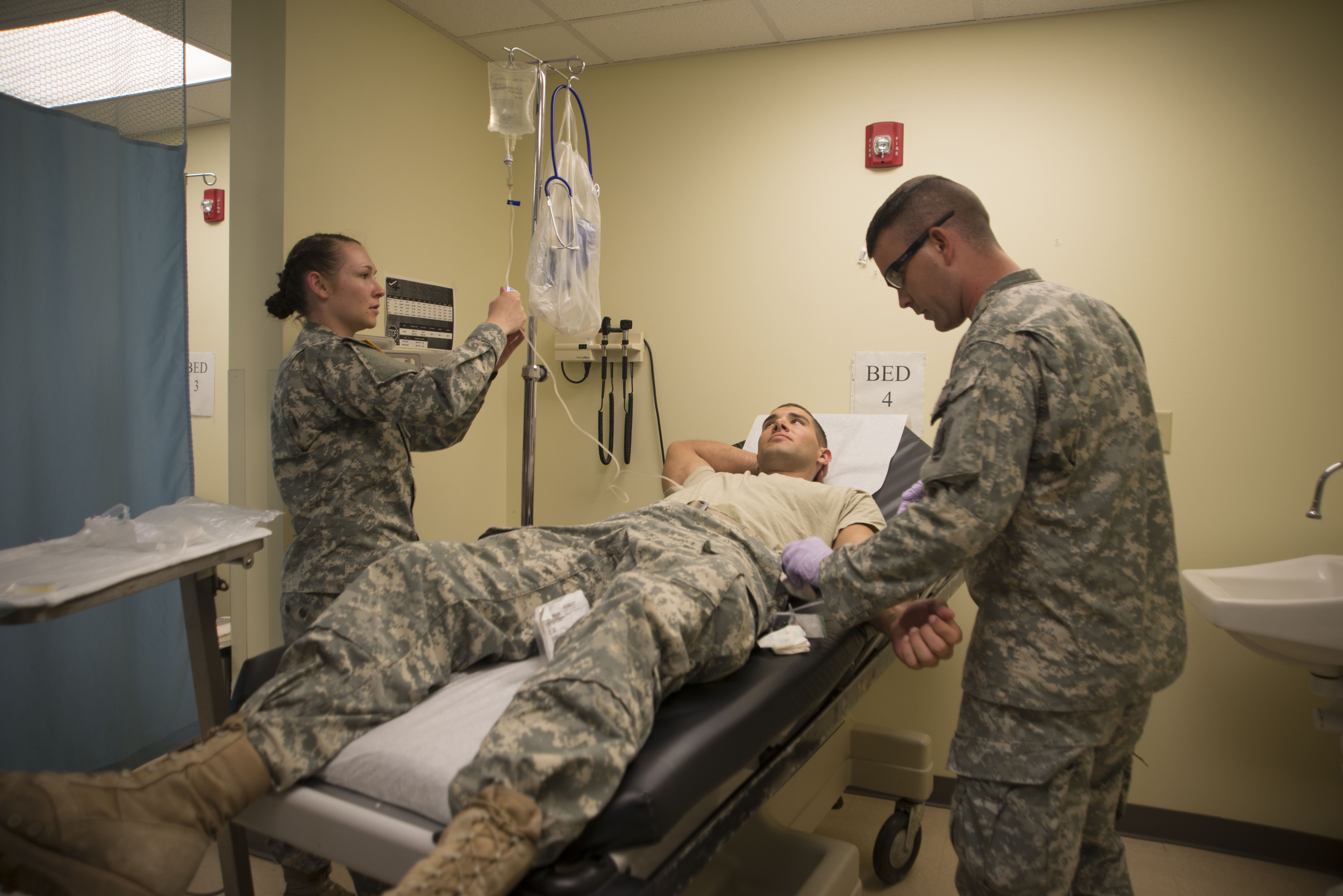
U.S. Army Sgt. Charles Wilkins with the 313th Medical Company (Ground Ambulance) of the Nebraska Army National Guard demonstrating his technique to administer an IV

As of February 2026 the Nebraska Army National Guard consists of the following units:

- Joint Force Headquarters-Nebraska, Army Element,, in Lincoln
  - Headquarters and Headquarters Company, Joint Force Headquarters-Nebraska, Army Element, in Lincoln
  - Nebraska Recruiting & Retention Battalion, in Lincoln
    - Detachment 1, Nebraska Recruiting & Retention Battalion, at Camp Ashland
    - Detachment 2, Nebraska Recruiting & Retention Battalion, in Scottsbluff
    - Detachment 3, Nebraska Recruiting & Retention Battalion, in Norfolk
    - Detachment 4, Nebraska Recruiting & Retention Battalion, in Kearney
    - Detachment 5, Nebraska Recruiting & Retention Battalion, in Lincoln
  - Nebraska Medical Detachment, in Lincoln
  - 105th Military History Detachment, in Lincoln
  - 111th Public Affairs Detachment, in Lincoln
  - Detachment 1, 429th Judge Advocate General Trial Defense Team, in Lincoln
  - 1969th Support Detachment (Contracting Team), in Lincoln
  - Army Aviation Support Facility #1, at Lincoln Airport
  - Army Aviation Support Facility #2, at Central Nebraska Airport
  - Combined Support Maintenance Shop #1, in Lincoln
  - Unit Training Equipment Site #1, in Hastings
  - Unit Training Equipment Site #2, in Mead
  - Field Maintenance Shop #2, in Kearney
  - Field Maintenance Shop #3, in North Platte
  - Field Maintenance Shop #4, in Gering
  - Field Maintenance Shop #5, at Camp Ashland
  - Field Maintenance Shop #7, in Norfolk
  - 67th Maneuver Enhancement Brigade, in Lincoln
    - Headquarters Support Company, 67th Maneuver Enhancement Brigade, in Lincoln
    - 234th Brigade Signal Company, in Lincoln
    - 126th Chemical Battalion, in Omaha
      - Headquarters and Headquarters Company, 126th Chemical Battalion, in Omaha
      - 43rd Army Band, in Omaha
      - Cyber Protection Team 179, in Omaha
    - 128th Engineer Battalion, in Columbus
      - Headquarters and Headquarters Company, 128th Engineer Battalion, in Columbus
      - Forward Support Company, 128th Engineer Battalion, in Hastings
      - 623rd Engineer Company (Vertical Construction Company), in Wahoo
      - 181st Engineer Detachment (Fire Fighting Team — Fire Truck), in Norfolk
      - 281st Engineer Detachment (Fire Fighting Team — Fire Truck), in Hastings
      - 317th Engineer Detachment (Fire Fighting Team — Fire Truck), in Norfolk
      - 617th Engineer Detachment (Fire Fighting Team — Fire Truck), in Hastings
      - 755th Engineer Detachment (Fire Fighting Team — HQ), in Columbus
    - 402nd Military Police Battalion, in Omaha
      - Headquarters and Headquarters Detachment, 402nd Military Police Battalion, in Omaha
      - 192nd Military Police Detachment (Law Enforcement), in Omaha
      - 1057th Military Police Company, in Chadron
    - 734th Combat Sustainment Support Battalion, in Kearney
      - 189th Transportation Company (Medium Truck) (Cargo), in Norfolk
      - 267th Ordnance Company (Support Maintenance), at Lincoln Air National Guard Base
      - 901st Quartermaster Platoon (Field Feeding), in Lincoln
      - 1075th Transportation Company (Medium Truck) (Cargo), in North Platte
        - Detachment 1, 1075th Transportation Company, in McCook
  - 92nd Troop Command, in Lincoln
    - 72nd Civil Support Team (WMD), in Lincoln
    - 1st Squadron, 134th Cavalry Regiment, in Yutan (part of 39th Infantry Brigade Combat Team)
      - Headquarters and Headquarters Troop, 1st Squadron, 134th Cavalry Regiment, in Yutan
        - Detachment 3, Headquarters and Headquarters Battery, 1st Battalion, 206th Field Artillery Regiment, in Yutan
      - Troop A, 1st Squadron, 134th Cavalry Regiment, in Hastings
      - Troop B, 1st Squadron, 134th Cavalry Regiment, in York
      - Troop C (Dismounted), 1st Squadron, 134th Cavalry Regiment, in Beatrice
      - Company D (Forward Support), 39th Brigade Support Battalion, in Yutan
    - 2nd Battalion, 134th Infantry Regiment (Airborne), in Lincoln (part of 45th Infantry Brigade Combat Team)
      - Headquarters and Headquarters Company, 2nd Battalion, 134th Infantry Regiment (Airborne), in Lincoln
      - Company A, 2nd Battalion, 134th Infantry Regiment (Airborne), in Yutan
      - Company B, 2nd Battalion, 134th Infantry Regiment (Airborne), in Yutan
      - Company C, 2nd Battalion, 134th Infantry Regiment (Airborne), in Seymour (IN) — (Indiana Army National Guard)
      - Company D (Weapons), 2nd Battalion, 134th Infantry Regiment (Airborne), in Kearney
      - Company I (Forward Support), 700th Brigade Support Battalion, in Omaha
    - 1st Battalion (Security & Support), 376th Aviation Regiment, at Central Nebraska Airport (part of 63rd Theater Aviation Brigade)
      - Headquarters and Headquarters Company, 1st Battalion (Security & Support), 376th Aviation Regiment, at Central Nebraska Airport
      - Company A, 1st Battalion (Security & Support), 376th Aviation Regiment, at Lincoln Airport (UH-72A Lakota)
        - Detachment 1, Company A, 1st Battalion (Security & Support), 376th Aviation Regiment, at Waterloo Airport (IA) — (Iowa Army National Guard)
      - Company B, 1st Battalion (Security & Support), 376th Aviation Regiment, at Jefferson City Airport (MO) (UH-72A Lakota) — (Missouri Army National Guard)
        - Detachment 1, Company B, 1st Battalion (Security & Support), 376th Aviation Regiment, at Decatur Airport (IL) — (Illinois Army National Guard)
        - Detachment 2, Company B, 1st Battalion (Security & Support), 376th Aviation Regiment, at Guam Airport (GU) — (Guam Army National Guard)
      - Company C, 1st Battalion (Security & Support), 376th Aviation Regiment, at Capital City Airport (KY) — (UH-72A Lakota) — (Kentucky Army National Guard)
        - Detachment 1, Company C, 1st Battalion (Security & Support), 376th Aviation Regiment, at Gary/Chicago Airport (IN) — (Indiana Army National Guard)
      - Company D (MEDEVAC), 1st Battalion (Security & Support), 376th Aviation Regiment, at Central Nebraska Airport (UH-72A Lakota])
        - Detachment 1, Company D (MEDEVAC), 1st Battalion (Security & Support), 376th Aviation Regiment, at Akron-Canton Airport (OH) — (Ohio Army National Guard)
      - Company G (MEDEVAC), 2nd Battalion (General Support Aviation), 104th Aviation Regiment, at Lincoln Airport (HH-60L Black Hawk)
      - Company B (Heavy Lift), 2nd Battalion (General Support Aviation), 135th Aviation Regiment, at Central Nebraska Airport (CH-47F Chinook)
        - Detachment 1, Headquarters and Headquarters Company, 2nd Battalion (General Support Aviation), 135th Aviation Regiment, at Central Nebraska Airport
        - Detachment 1, Company D (AVUM), 2nd Battalion (General Support Aviation), 135th Aviation Regiment, at Central Nebraska Airport
        - Detachment 1, Company E (Forward Support), 2nd Battalion (General Support Aviation), 135th Aviation Regiment, at Central Nebraska Airport
      - Detachment 1, Company A, 2nd Battalion (Fixed Wing), 641st Aviation Regiment (Detachment 43, Operational Support Airlift Activity), at Lincoln Airport (C-12 Huron)
      - Detachment 4, Company B (AVIM), 640th Aviation Support Battalion, at Central Nebraska Airport
  - 209th Regiment, Regional Training Institute, Camp Ashland
    - 1st Battalion, Noncommissioned Officer Academy
    - 2nd Battalion, Officer Candidate School/Warrant Officer Candidate School
    - 3rd Battalion, Transportation Schoolhouse

Aviation unit abbreviations: MEDEVAC — Medical evacuation; AVUM — Aviation Unit Maintenance; AVIM — Aviation Intermediate Maintenance

== Historic units ==
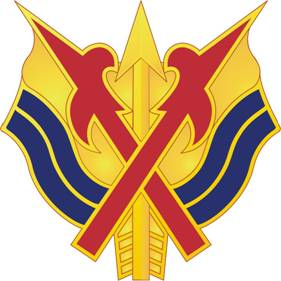
- 67th Maneuver Enhancement Brigade - As the 67th Infantry Brigade, the brigade was initially formed in August 1917 in the Iowa and Nebraska Army National Guards, and was part of the 34th Division mobilized for World War I.
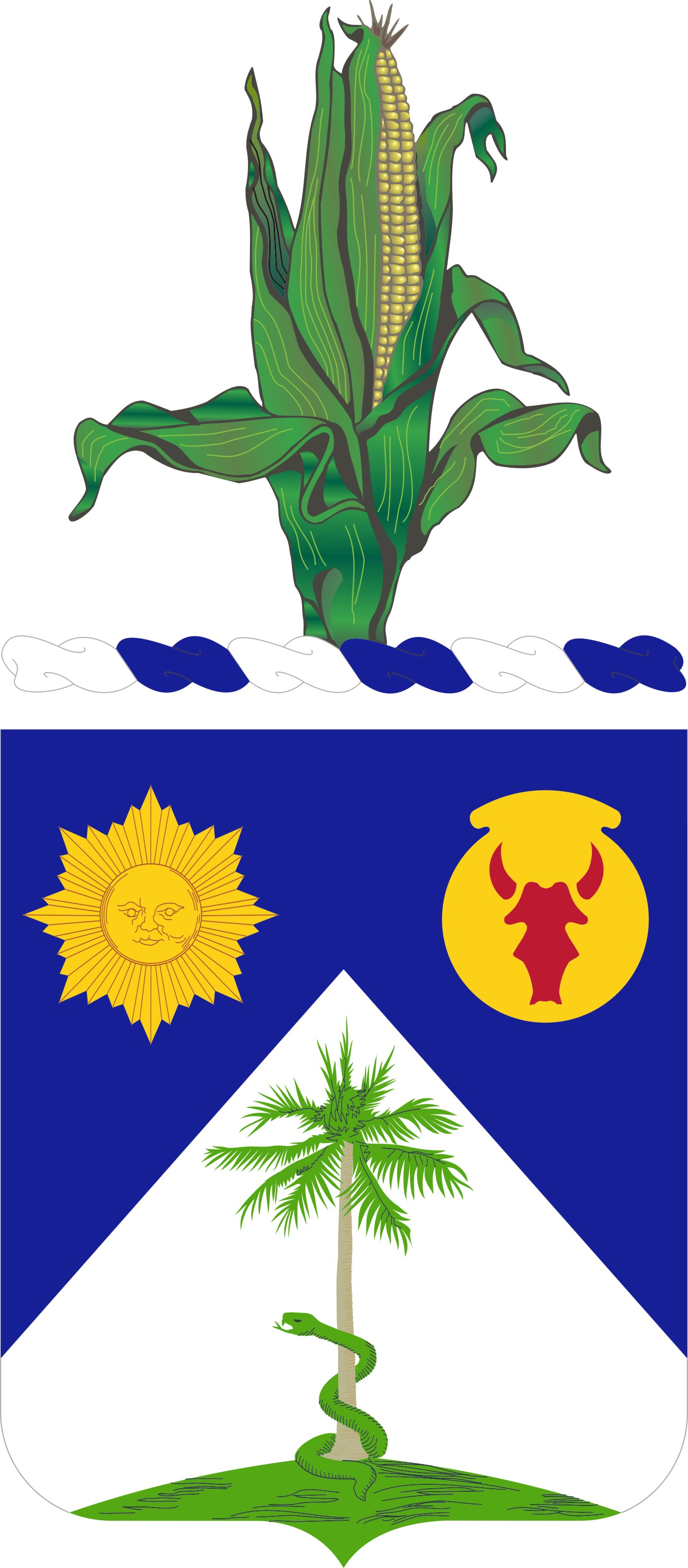
- 134th Infantry Regiment
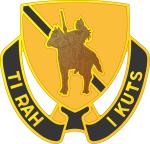
- 167th Cavalry Regiment - The regiment was constituted on February 12, 1964 as a CARS parent regiment, consisting of Troop E-167 CAV, an element of the 67th Infantry Brigade. Reorganised 1 October 1985 to comprise 1st Squadron, an element of the 35th Infantry Division. Transferred from CARS to USARS headquarters in Lincoln on 1 June 1989. The 1-167th Cavalry was re-organized into the 1st Squadron, 134th Cavalry (R&S) in 2008.
- 168th Field Artillery Regiment (formerly 3rd Battalion, 134th Infantry)
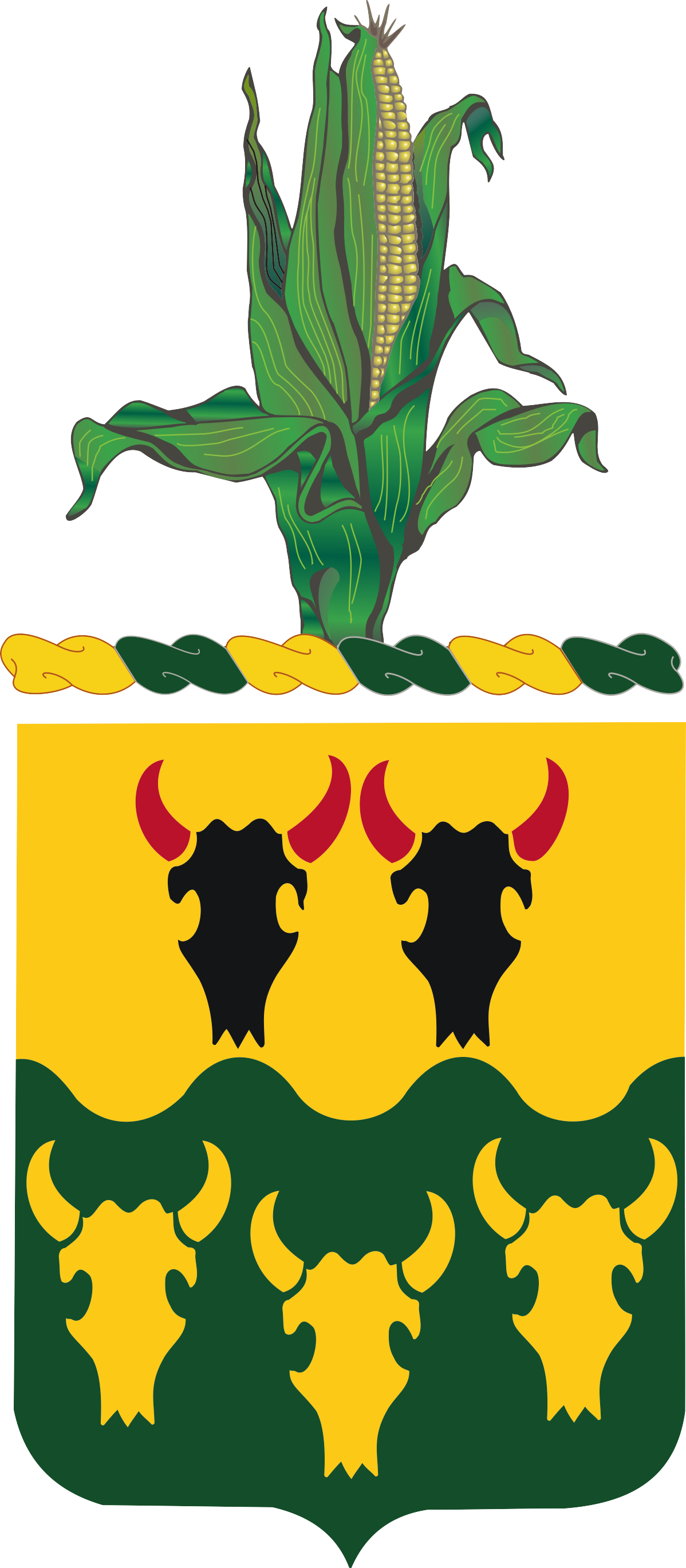
- 195th Armored Regiment - The Regiment was constituted 20 June 1946 as the 128th Engineer Combat Battalion and allocated to the Nebraska ARNG as a component of the 34th Infantry Division. Organized and federally recognized on 20 November 1947 with headquarters at Omaha, elements organized from new and existing companies. Reorganized and redesignated 1 February 1953 as the 128th Engineer Battalion. Location of headquarters changed 1 May 1959 to Kearny. Relieved 1 April 1963 from assigned to the 34th Infantry Division. Converted, reorganized, and redesignated 1 May 1968 as the 195th Armor, a parent regiment under CARS, consisting of the 1st Battalion. 1 November 1978 assigned to the 67th Infantry Brigade. Reallocated to the 35th Infantry Division on 1 October 1985. 1 June 1989 reallocated from CARS to United States Army Regimental System. Globalsecurity.org reports that "[t]he 195th Armor Battalion (sic) of the Nebraska National Guard, a subordinate unit of the 67th Infantry Brigade, deactivated on Sunday September 2, 2001. Its elements were redesignated as the 734th Transportation Battalion (Motor Support)."
- 1st Brigade - Constituted in August 1887 to control all units within the National guard. upon its founding the Brigade commanded the 1st and 2nd Infantry Regiments along with Battery A, Field Artillery and Troop A, Cavalry. In the winter of 1890–91, durning the Ghost Dance War, elements of the Brigade along with its headquarters were moved to the north end of the state in order to contain the native threat. Durning the War with Spain all elements, bar Battery A, was mobilized for the war along with the staff of the Brigade effectively making it non-existent. Upon the mobilization of the Nebraska National Guard for World War I the Brigade, along with the rest of the guard, was moved to Camp Cody, New Mexico where Brigade Headquarters was brought to federal service, becoming the 59th Depot Brigade being dispanded after the war.

== See also ==
- Nebraska State Guard
