= 376th Aviation Regiment =

- Country: United States
- Branch: United States Army Aviation Branch
- Type: Aviation

Aircraft flown
- Utility helicopter: UH-72A Lakota

The 376th Aviation Regiment is an aviation regiment of the United States Army.

== Structure ==
- 1st Battalion (Security & Support)
  - Headquarters and Headquarters Company (NE ARNG)
  - Company A (-) (UH-72A) (NE ARNG)
    - Detachment 1 at Waterloo (IA ARNG)
    - Detachment 2 at Davenport (IA ARNG)
    - Detachment ? at Army Aviation Support Facility #1 at Lincoln Airport (NE ARNG).
  - Company B at Jefferson City (MO ARNG)
    - Detachment 1 at Decatur (IL ARNG)
    - Detachment 2 at Barriguda (GU ARNG)
  - Company C (-)(KY ARNG)
    - Detachment 1 (IN ARNG)
  - Company D (Air Ambulance)(-)(NE ARNG)
