= Fort Riley-Camp Whiteside, Kansas =

Fort Riley-Camp Whitside, Kansas
- Former CDP
- Location of Fort Riley-Camp Whitside, Kansas
- Coordinates: 39°5′5″N 96°46′17″W
- Country: United States
- State: Kansas
- County: Geary

Area
  - Total: 0.69 sq mi (1.8 km^{2})
  - Land: 0.69 sq mi (1.8 km^{2})
  - Water: 0 sq mi (0.0 km^{2})

Population (2000)
  - Total: 103
  - Density: 148/sq mi (57.3/km^{2})
- Time zone: UTC-6 (Central (CST))
  - Summer (DST): UTC-5 (CDT)
- FIPS code: 20-23980

Fort Riley-Camp Whiteside is a former census-designated place (CDP) that covers part of Fort Riley, a US Army installation in Geary County, Kansas, United States. The population was 103 at the 2000 census. The area was not recorded as a CDP for the 2010 census.

== Geography ==
The former CDP was located at 39°5′5″N 96°46′17″W (39.084758, -96.771370).

According to the United States Census Bureau, the CDP had a total area of 0.7 square miles (1.8 km^{2}), all of it land.

== Demographics ==
The CDP was part of the Manhattan, Kansas Metropolitan Statistical Area.

As of the census of 2000, there were 103 people, 3 households, and 2 families residing in the CDP. The population density was 148.3 inhabitants per square mile (57.3/km^{2}). There were 3 housing units at an average density of 4.3 per square mile (1.7/km^{2}). The racial makeup of the CDP was 63.1% White, 21.4% African American, 1.0% Native American, 3.9% Asian, 5.8% from other races, and 4.9% from two or more races. Hispanic or Latino of any race were 10.7% of the population.

There were 3 households, out of which 33.3% had children under the age of 18 living with them, 66.7% were married couples living together, and 33.3% were non-families. No households were made up of individuals, and none had someone living alone who was 65 years of age or older. The average household size was 2.33 and the average family size was 2.50.

In the CDP, the population was spread out, with 1.0% under the age of 18, 35.9% from 18 to 24, 58.3% from 25 to 44, and 4.9% from 45 to 64. The median age was 27 years. For every 100 females, there were 178.4 males. For every 100 females age 18 and over, there were 175.7 males.

The median income for a household in the CDP was $46,250, and the median income for a family was $46,250. Males had a median income of $18,438 versus $11,250 for females. The per capita income for the CDP was $12,718. None of the population and none of the families were below the poverty line.
