= Kenneth F. Cramer =

United States Army general (1894–1954)

Kenneth Frank Cramer
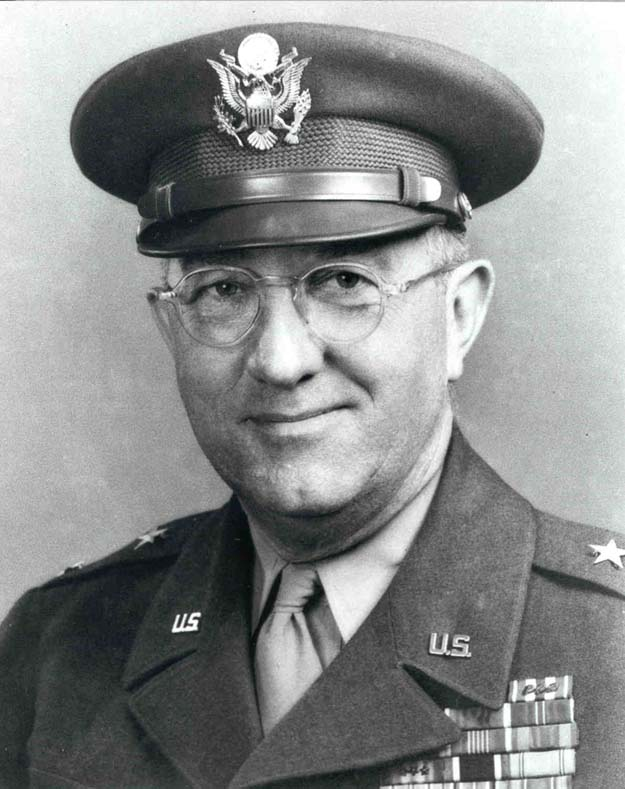
- Major General Cramer as National Guard Bureau Chief, c. 1949
- Born: October 3, 1894; Gloversville, New York, US
- Died: February 20, 1954 (aged 59); Heidelberg, Germany
- Burial place: Arlington National Cemetery
- Military career
- Allegiance: United States of America
- Branch: United States Army
- Service years: 1917–1954
- Rank: Major General
- Units: Connecticut Army National Guard; National Guard Bureau
- Commands: 169th Infantry Regiment; 24th Infantry Division; 43rd Infantry Division; Chief of the National Guard Bureau; Southern Area Command, United States Army Europe
- Conflicts: World War I World War II; Korean War
- Awards: Silver Star (4); Legion of Merit; Bronze Star Medal; Air Medal; Purple Heart; Army Commendation Medal

Member of the Connecticut State Senate
- In office 1933–1937

Member of the Connecticut House of Representatives
- In office 1929–1933

Personal details
- Party: Republican
- Education: Princeton University
- Occupation: Coal dealer State legislator

Kenneth F. Cramer (October 3, 1894 – February 20, 1954) was an American politician and United States Army major general who served as Chief of the National Guard Bureau.

== Early life and education ==
Kenneth Frank Cramer was born in Gloversville, New York, on October 3, 1894. He graduated from Princeton University in 1916, and received his master's degree in 1917. In 1938, he completed the United States Army Command and General Staff College and was his class Honor Graduate.

== Career ==
=== World War I ===
Cramer enlisted in the United States Army for World War I and completed officer training in 1917. He served in France during World War I, primarily with the 310th Infantry Regiment, a unit of the 78th Infantry Division. His service included combat during the St. Mihiel and Meuse-Argonne campaigns, and he was wounded and taken prisoner. He recuperated in a German hospital, and was released at the end of the war.

=== Post-World War I ===
After the war, he maintained his membership in the Army Reserve and in 1931 transferred to the Connecticut Army National Guard as a captain, accepting a demotion from major in order to command a newly organized tank company.

Cramer continued to advance through the ranks, and his assignments in Connecticut included: Plans, Operations and Training Officer, S3 for the 169th Infantry Regiment; Commander of 3rd Battalion, 169th Infantry Regiment; and Assistant Adjutant General of the Connecticut National Guard.

=== Connecticut Legislature ===
He resided in Wethersfield, Connecticut, and in his civilian career he worked in the coal business, eventually becoming owner and operator of Hartford's K.F. Cramer Coal Company. Cramer served on the Wethersfield School Board from 1927 to 1937. He was a member of the Connecticut House (1929–1933) and Senate (1933–1937), and was a delegate to several Republican conventions.

=== World War II ===
He was a colonel and commander of the 169th Infantry Regiment when he mobilized for World War II with New England's 43rd "Winged Victory" Division. He was soon transferred to the Pacific-bound 24th Infantry Division to become Assistant Division Commander and was promoted to brigadier general.

Cramer took command of the 24th Division in 1945 and was promoted to major general.

=== Post-World War II ===
After the war, Cramer was assigned as commander of the 43rd Division. In 1947 he was appointed Chief of the National Guard Bureau, and assistant division commander Reginald W. Buzzell was appointed to serve as acting division commander.

Cramer's tenure was highlighted by a feud with the Director of the newly formed Air National Guard, Major General George Finch, over the role the National Guard Bureau would play in the Air Guard's operations. The recently organized United States Air Force viewed the National Guard Bureau as providing purely administrative functions, while Cramer viewed NGB's (and the NGB Chief's) role as a more direct policy-making and oversight one. Finch argued for Air Force control of the Air National Guard, putting him at odds with Cramer. The feud reached a high point in 1949 when Cramer dismissed Finch without consulting the Air Force leadership. (Cramer later reinstated Finch.)

In 1950, the Miltonberger Board, which was formed to review the National Guard Bureau's structure and policies, largely validated Cramer's view by recommending that the National Guard Bureau remain in the Air National Guard's chain of authority, with the NGB Chief exercising responsibility for both the Army and Air National Guards. The board also recommended the creation of a Deputy Chief of the National Guard Bureau position, to be filled by a major general of the opposite service from the Chief, who could provide advice and subject matter expertise to the Chief. Both recommendations were adopted.

The feud ended when Finch was reassigned as senior Air Force member of the team which negotiated the treaty that ended the Korean War and Cramer also requested a new assignment. Cramer was succeeded as NGB Chief by Raymond H. Fleming.

=== Korean War ===
In 1950, Cramer commanded the 43rd Division when it was federalized for service in West Germany during the Korean War.

During the division's mobilization at Fort Pickett, Virginia, Cramer was the target of protest by wives who objected to his insistence that soldiers stay on post each night, rather than spending nights with their families off post. In addition, he was investigated over concerns that his disciplinary measures in Germany were too harsh and had a negative effect on unit morale. Cramer argued that requiring soldiers to remain on post during mobilization was necessary to improve readiness and cohesion by maximizing training time and that his actions in Germany were an effort to curtail black market activities. Although accused of being a martinet, Cramer was not found to be at fault.

In 1952, he relinquished command of the 43rd Division in order to take command of the Southern Area Command in Germany, a subordinate unit of United States Army Europe, and he served in this assignment until his death.

== Death and burial ==
Cramer died of a heart attack on February 20, 1954, while hunting near Heidelberg, Germany. He was buried in Arlington National Cemetery. At the time of his death Cramer had completed doctoral studies at the Ludwig-Maximilians-Universität München and had submitted his dissertation.

== Awards and decorations ==
Cramer's awards included the Silver Star (four awards), Legion of Merit, Bronze Star Medal, Air Medal, Army Commendation Medal and Purple Heart.

== Legacy ==
Cramer's sister Beatrice endowed a scholarship in his name at the State University of New York at Cortland. The Kenneth Frank Cramer Scholarship is awarded annually to the top female applicant from Gloversville High School.

Military offices
Preceded by MG Butler B. Miltonberger	Chief of the National Guard Bureau; 1947–1950	Succeeded by MG Raymond H. Fleming
