= Nels Wold =

Nels T. Wold
- Born: December 24, 1895; Winger, Minnesota
- Died: September 26, 1918 (aged 22) near Cheppy, France
- Burial place: Elim Cemetery, Winger, Minnesota
- Military career
- Branch: United States Army
- Rank: Private
- Service number: 2140528
- Units: 138th Infantry Regiment, 35th Division
- Conflicts: World War I • Meuse–Argonne offensive
- Awards: Medal of Honor

Nels T. Wold (December 24, 1895 – September 26, 1918) was a United States Army soldier and a recipient of the United States military's highest decoration—the Medal of Honor—for his actions in World War I.

== Military service ==
The son of Norwegian immigrants, Wold joined the Army from Minnewaukan, North Dakota, and served as a private in Company I, 138th Infantry Regiment, 35th Division. At the start of the Meuse–Argonne offensive on September 26, 1918, his battalion was tasked with capturing the French village of Cheppy. Wold's platoon, at the battalion's far left flank, was to act as a communication link between the battalion and the neighboring 137th Infantry Regiment. However, thick fog caused the platoon to lose contact with both the 137th and its own battalion immediately after the advance on Cheppy began. The platoon continued forward as a combat patrol until encountering a group of American scouts led by Lieutenant John Wingate. Wingate combined the two groups and led them behind German lines, with the intention of attacking the Germans from the rear and thus clearing the way for the American advance.

Upon reaching the German rear outside Cheppy, with the fog lifted, the group began destroying enemy positions one at a time. One well-placed machine gun nest, located in a clump of bushes, was deemed too dangerous to attack head-on. Wold asked for and received permission to crawl up to the position and investigate. While the rest of the group took cover, he crept up to the rear of the emplacement, killed two occupants, and captured the remaining three. As the group continued on, clearing ambuscades, sniper posts, and gun emplacements, Wold volunteered four more times to single-handedly attack machine gun nests. He was successful each time except the last. He was killed by machine gun fire while penetrating a camouflage screen which concealed the fifth emplacement. His comrades then charged the position, killed the occupants and recovered Wold's body.

Wold, aged 22 at his death, was buried at Elim Cemetery in his birthplace of Winger, Minnesota.

== Medal of Honor citation ==
Private Wold's official Medal of Honor citation reads:

He rendered most gallant service in aiding the advance of his company, which had been held up by machinegun nests, advancing, with 1 other soldier, and silencing the guns, bringing with him, upon his return, 11 prisoners. Later the same day he jumped from a trench and rescued a comrade who was about to be shot by a German officer, killing the officer during the exploit. His actions were entirely voluntary, and it was while attempting to rush a 5th machinegun nest that he was killed. The advance of his company was mainly due to his great courage and devotion to duty.

== See also ==
- List of Medal of Honor recipients
- 138th Infantry Regiment
