= Alexander R. Skinker =

US Medal of Honor recipient (1883-1918)

Alexander Rives Skinker
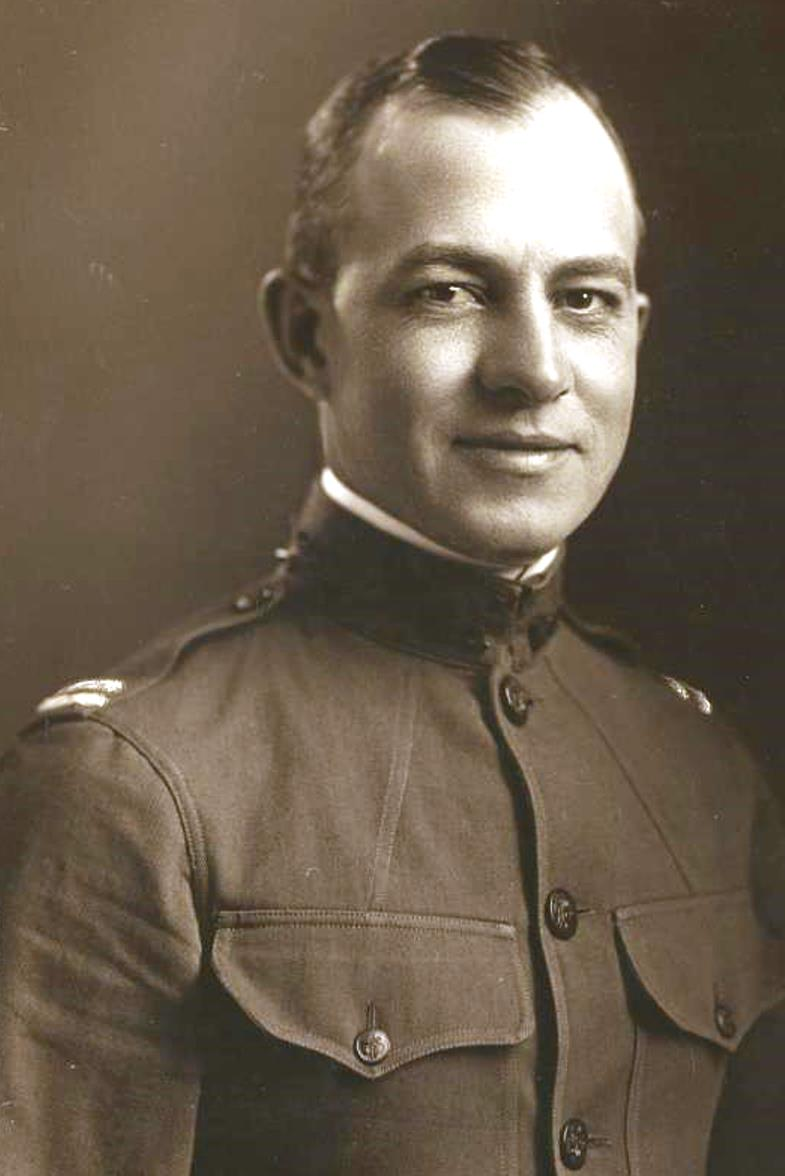
- Skinker in 1917
- Born: October 13, 1883; St. Louis, Missouri, US
- Died: September 26, 1918 (aged 34); Cheppy, France
- Burial place: Bellefontaine Cemetery, St. Louis
- Education: Washington University in St. Louis
- Military career
- Allegiance: United States
- Branch: Missouri National Guard; US Army
- Service years: 1903–1908, 1916–1918
- Rank: Captain
- Units: Company I, 138th Infantry Regiment, 35th Division
- Conflicts: Argonne Forest, World War I
- Awards: Medal of Honor

Captain Alexander Rives Skinker (October 13, 1883 – September 26, 1918) was a U.S. Army officer who was a Medal of Honor recipient during World War I. He graduated from Washington University in St. Louis in 1905. He served in the Missouri National Guard from 1903 to 1908, and entered the Army as a commissioned officer in 1916. He was awarded the medal for leading an attack on German pillboxes in the Hindenburg Line during the Meuse–Argonne offensive, and was killed in the attack.

He was buried at Bellefontaine Cemetery in St. Louis.

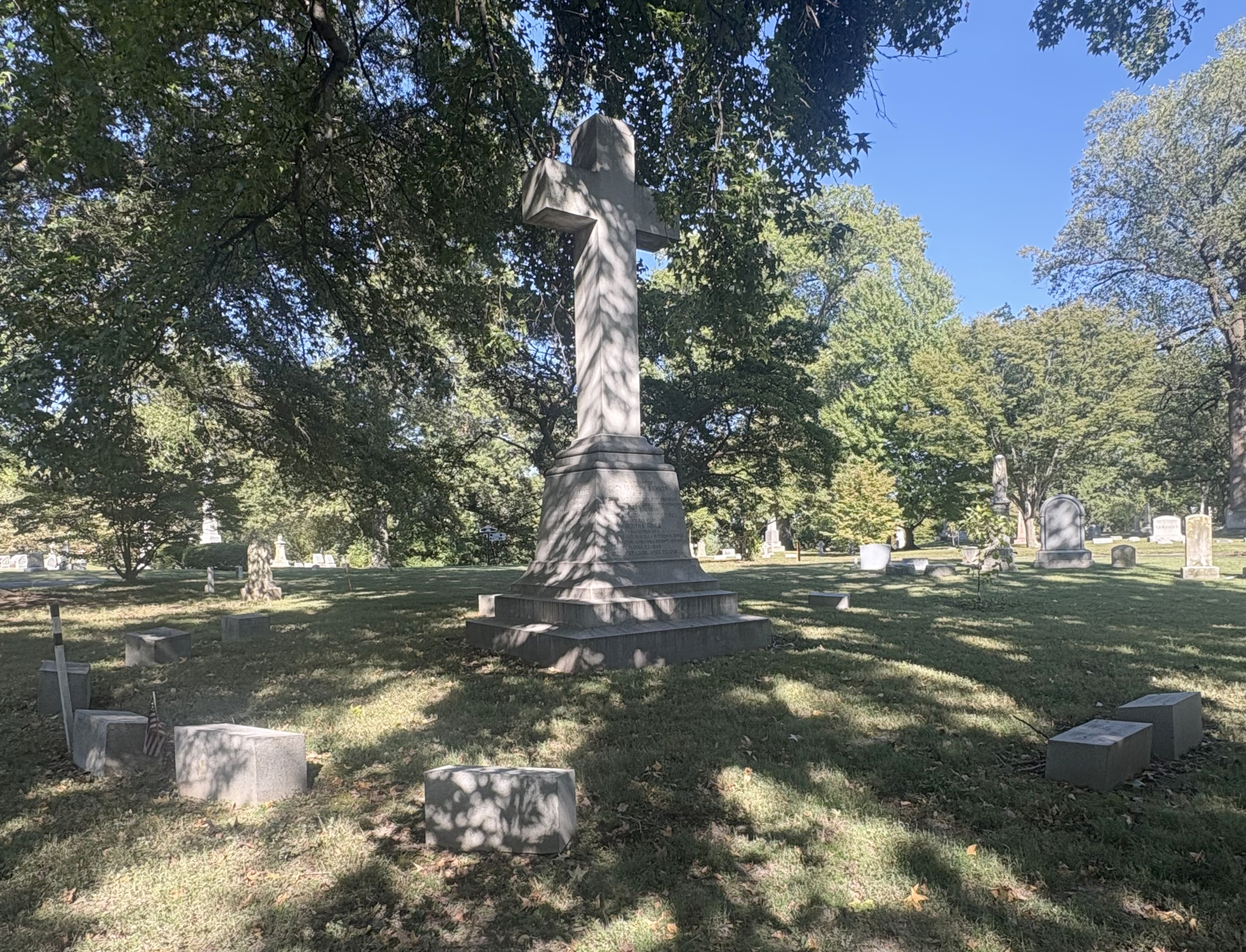
Skinker's grave (left, with American flag) at Bellefontaine Cemetery

== Medal of Honor citation ==
Rank and organization: Captain, U.S. Army, Company I, 138th Infantry, 35th Division. Place and date: At Cheppy, France; September 26, 1918. Entered service at: St. Louis, Missouri. Birth: October 13, 1883; St. Louis, Missouri. General Orders: War Department, General Orders No. 13 (January 18, 1919).

Citation:

Unwilling to sacrifice his men when his company was held up by terrific machinegun fire from iron pill boxes in the Hindenburg Line, Captain Skinker personally led an automatic rifleman and a carrier in an attack on the machineguns. The carrier was killed instantly, but Captain Skinker seized the ammunition and continued through an opening in the barbed wire, feeding the automatic rifle until he, too, was killed.

== Military awards ==
Skinker's military decorations and awards include:

1st row	Medal of Honor		
2nd row	Mexican Border Service Medal	World War I Victory Medal w/three bronze service stars to denote credit for the St. Mihiel, Meuse-Argonne and Defensive Sector battle clasps.	Croce al Merito di Guerra (Italy)

== See also ==
- List of Medal of Honor recipients
- List of Medal of Honor recipients for World War I
