= Apotheosis of St. Louis =

Sculpture by Charles Henry Niehaus

Coordinates: 38.63980°N 90.29409°W

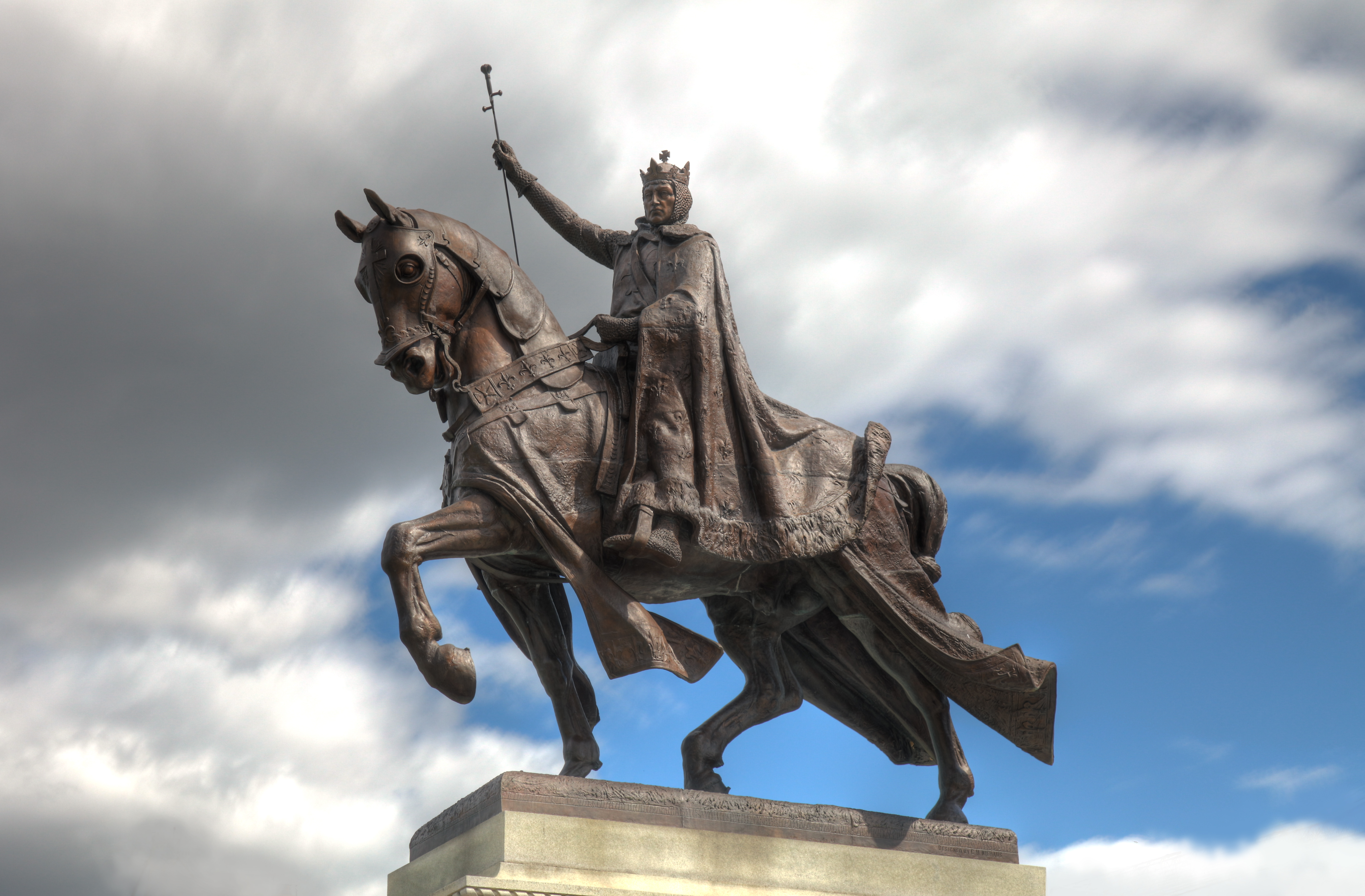
- Artist: Design by Charles Henry Niehaus, execution by W. R. Hodges
- Year: 1904–1906
- Type: Bronze
- Location: Saint Louis Art Museum, St. Louis, Missouri

Apotheosis of St. Louis is a statue of King Louis IX of France, namesake of St. Louis, Missouri, located in front of the Saint Louis Art Museum in Forest Park. Part of the iconography of St. Louis, the statue was the principal symbol of the city between its erection in 1906 and the construction of the Gateway Arch in the mid-1960s.

== History ==
The bronze statue that stands in Forest Park today was donated to Forest Park by the Louisiana Purchase Exposition Company after the 1904 World's Fair. It is a replica of a plaster statue that stood on the concourse of the Plaza of St. Louis, near the main entrance to the fair (where the Missouri History Museum now stands). Its sculptor, Charles Henry Niehaus, offered to create a bronze version of the plaster model for $90,000. Instead, the company took a lower $37,500 bid from a local artist, W. R. Hodges. Niehaus sued the company for infringement of his intellectual property rights, and he was awarded $3,000 and "designed by C. H. Niehaus" inscribed on the pedestal. It was unveiled on October 4, 1906.

On the west side of the pedestal is the inscription, "Presented to the City of St. Louis by the Louisiana Purchase Exposition in commemoration of the Universal Exposition of 1904 held on this site." The north and south sides are inscribed "Saint Louis."

The statue featured heavily in St. Louis iconography until the completion of the Gateway Arch in the 1960s. The statue in profile is the image on the arms and Distinctive Unit Insignia of the 138th Infantry Regiment (aka "The First Missouri" and "St. Louis' Own'") of the U.S. Army and Missouri National Guard. It was used as part of the logo for the St. Louis Browns in the 1930s and 40s. In 2008 it was resurrected by St. Louis Soccer United for use on their logo and converted to Joan of Arc for the St. Louis Athletica. This transmutation was made legitimate by the reconciling of Arc with Arch.

Over the years, Saint Louis' sword has been stolen several times by vandals. A local urban legend says university students used to dare one another to steal it.

In 2020, amid American racial unrest, a coalition of political activists called for the statute to be removed. The group was led by Umar Lee and accused King Louis IX of antisemitism, citing his burning of Jewish texts and the expulsion of French Jews, as well as the Seventh and Eighth Crusades. Local Catholics counter-protested in support of the statue by praying the rosary in front of the statue. The protest and counter-protest lasted nearly three hours and was mostly peaceful until some clashes broke out toward the end, instigated by the anti-Catholic protestors. Archbishop Robert James Carlson of the Archdiocese of St. Louis spoke in defense of the statue's presence, citing Louis IX's pious actions, including his charity towards the poor. Historian Thomas Madden of Saint Louis University evaluated the history of Louis IX and concluded that the statue is not religious art but a symbol of modern progress, ultimately arguing in favor of keeping the statue.

== Gallery ==
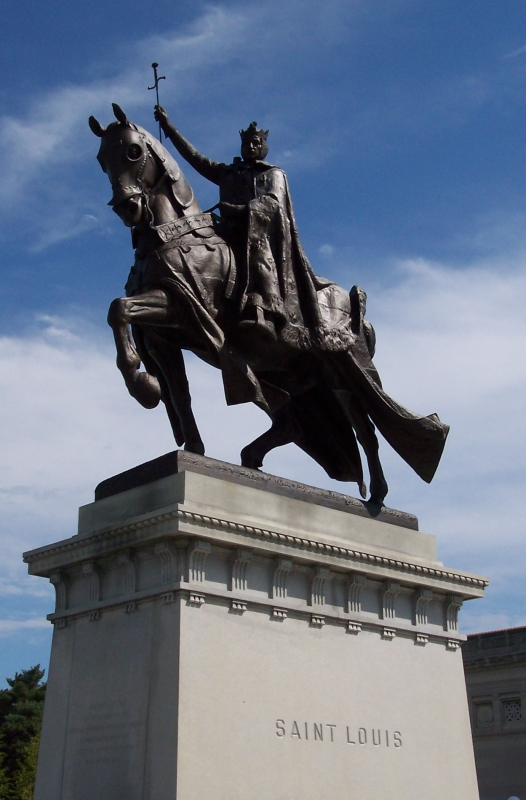

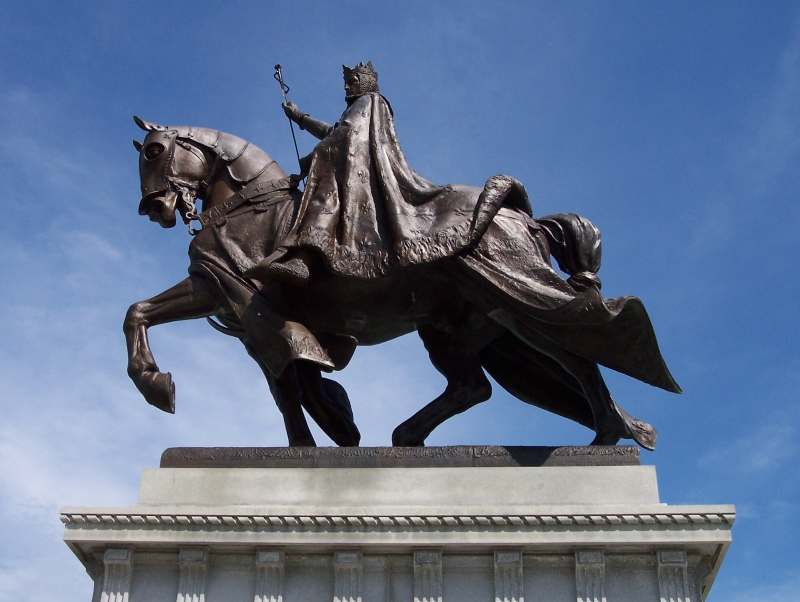

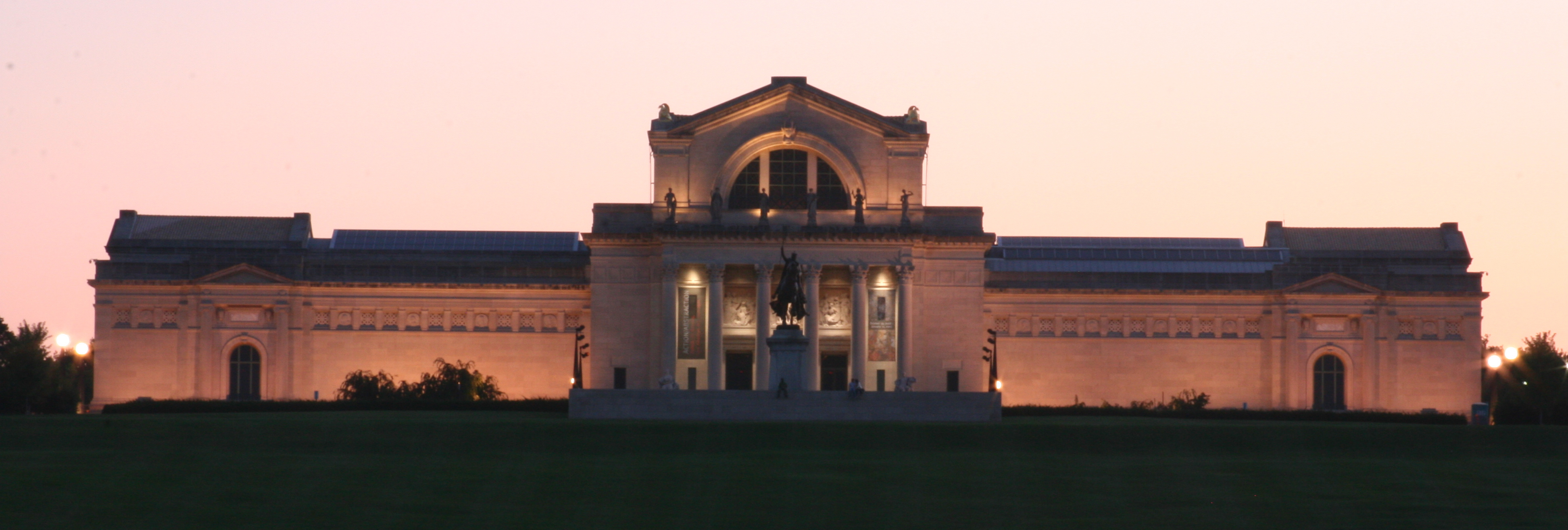
Positioned before the Art Museum
