= Iconography of St. Louis =

The St. Louis flag features two rivers merging in a confluence of French heritage signified by a fleur-de-lis.

The Iconography of St. Louis, Missouri is strongly informed by the city's French and German heritages, physical features, and place in American history.

== Mound City ==
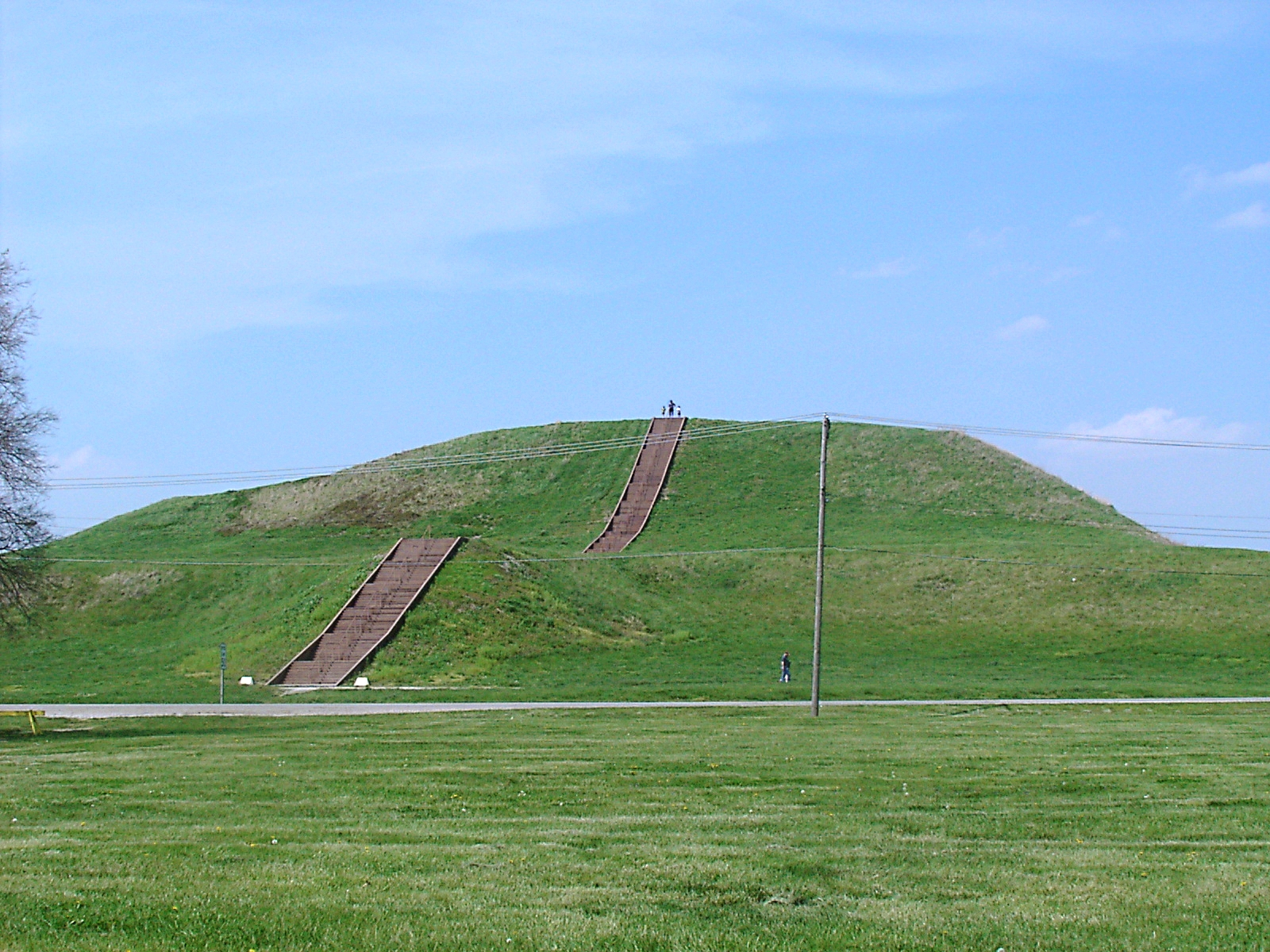
Monks Mound is one of the few remaining mounds in the St. Louis region.

Long before Europeans settled in St. Louis, the Cahokia lived throughout the area and constructed many mounds. Though history and population growth would eventually see most of these mounds flattened and removed, the city still bears the nickname Mound City. Mounds have largely fallen out of the popular imagination, but some projects still reference their existence. Dan Martin's weekly cartoon in the St. Louis Post-Dispatch, which is about St. Louis culture and topics, is titled "Postcard From Mound City".

The 2007 Master Plan for the Gateway Mall calls for a mound to be constructed at the mall's terminus to afford a better view.

== River City ==
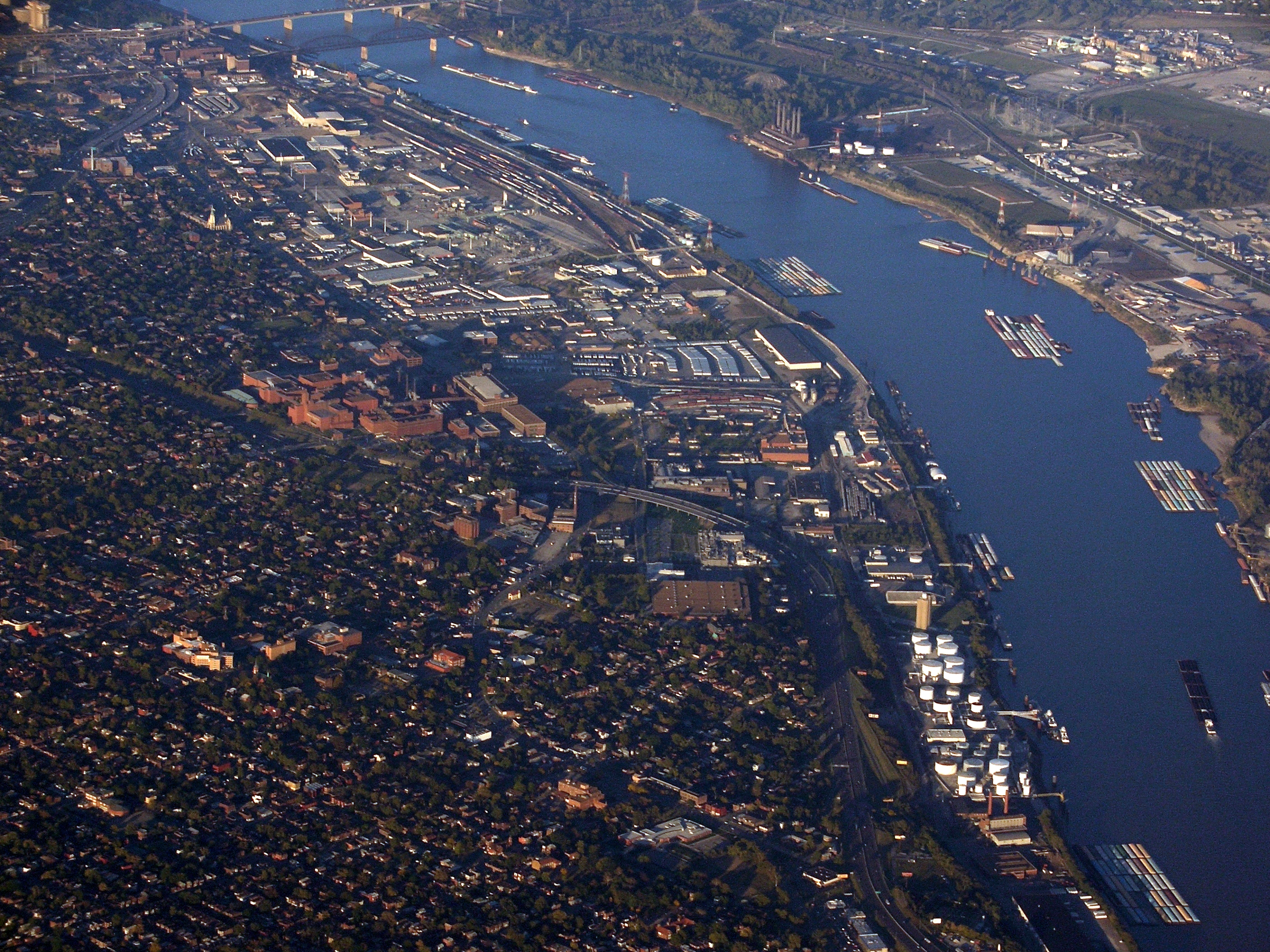
traffic on the Mississippi

St. Louis is at the confluence of the Illinois, Missouri, and Mississippi rivers. The city was founded by Pierre Laclede as a fur trading post because he believed the location had great potential in shipping.

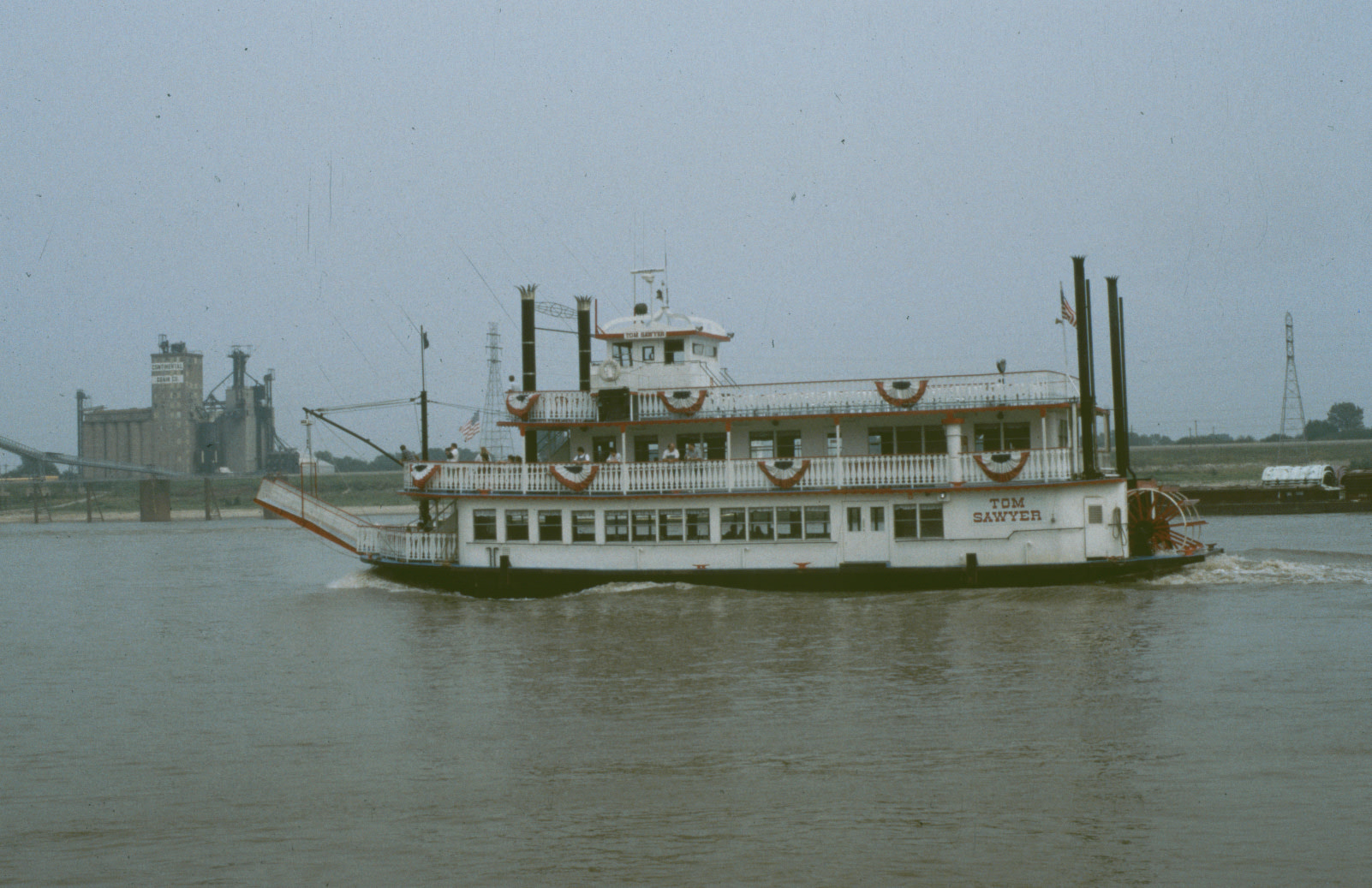
Tom Sawyer on the Mississippi

St. Louis has long been known for its barge traffic and steamboats. The writer Mark Twain is an icon of St. Louis in his own right, and wrote prolifically about the steamboats along the river.

The Missouri-Mississippi confluence has been appropriated for many uses over time. The local chapter of the Green Party, the Gateway Green Alliance, regularly publishes a periodically called The Confluence. Lindenwood University's department of History has an academic journal also called The Confluence. The term is a very popular reference for local politicians to make when speaking of great ideas intersecting. It is tied to the city's identity through the rivers on the city flag and great seasonal floods.

Aloe Plaza in front of Union Station (itself a souvenir of St Louis's glory days as America's fourth largest city, being the world's largest train station when it opened in 1894) features a large sculpture, Meeting of the Waters, which is centered around two large nude figures representing the Missouri and Mississippi rivers. (The sculpture was originally titled Marriage of the Waters, but the city fathers felt that a nude wedding was a bit too outré.)

== Saint Louis ==
St. Louis was founded by Pierre Laclede in honor of King Louis IX of France. Louis is honored to this day by the statue of him in Forest Park, The Apotheosis of St. Louis. The spelling "Saint Louis" usually refers to the person, while "St. Louis" refers to the city.

The fleur-de-lis, emblem of the French monarchy, is on the flag of the City of St. Louis, and is used extensively throughout the region on the logos of various charities and non-profits.

== Gateway City ==
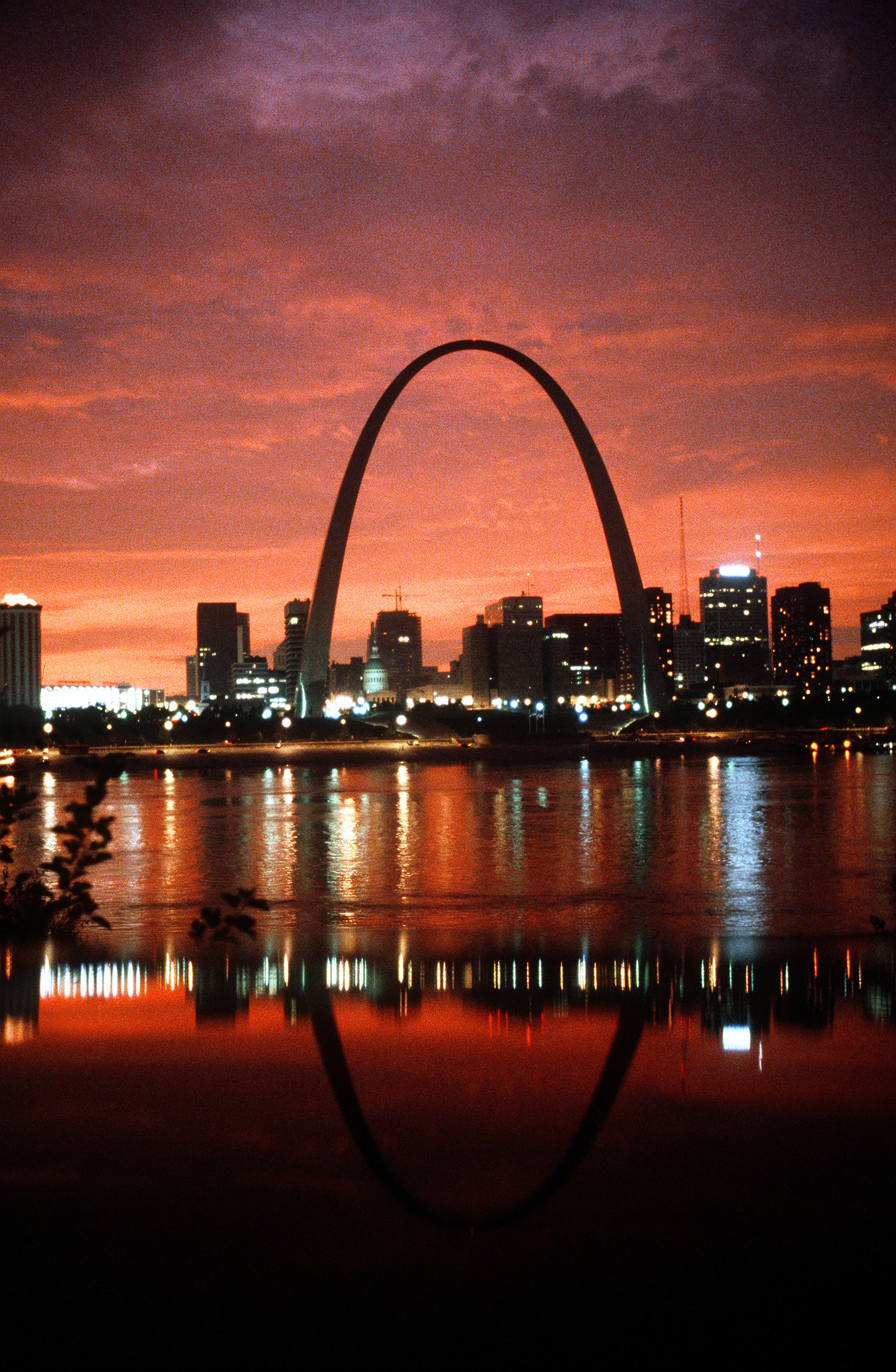
the city skyline

The Gateway Arch is the strongest symbol of St. Louis, but was built itself as memorial to the already present concept of the city as the Gateway to the West. The Lewis and Clark Expedition set out from the St. Louis area. It was the starting point for many on their journeys along the Oregon and Santa Fe trails. To this day, it bears reminders of Route 66 going through the city to connect Chicago to LA.

More than just a shipping city, St. Louis also played a role in the history of air travel. McDonnell Douglas and TWA, though now gone, were both based there. Charles Lindbergh's solo flight across the Atlantic was done in the Spirit of St. Louis. The airport code for Lambert International Airport, STL, has often stood in for the city's full name.

== A beer and baseball town ==
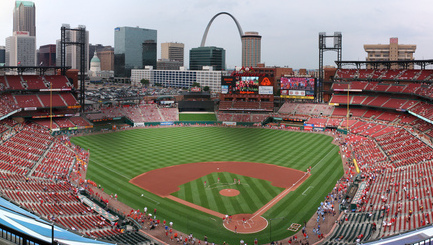
Busch Stadium in downtown St. Louis

The Anheuser-Busch company has long been a powerful engine in the St. Louis economy. Their ownership of the St. Louis Cardinals wedded two of the most popular groups in the region (St. Louis Cardinals fandom is widespread enough to have earned the sobriquet "Cardinal Nation"). The Budweiser brewery in Soulard emits a smell that permeates much of South City. The brewing smell is recognized by many locals, and is often used as an olfactory landmark alerting people to their proximity.

== Gallery ==
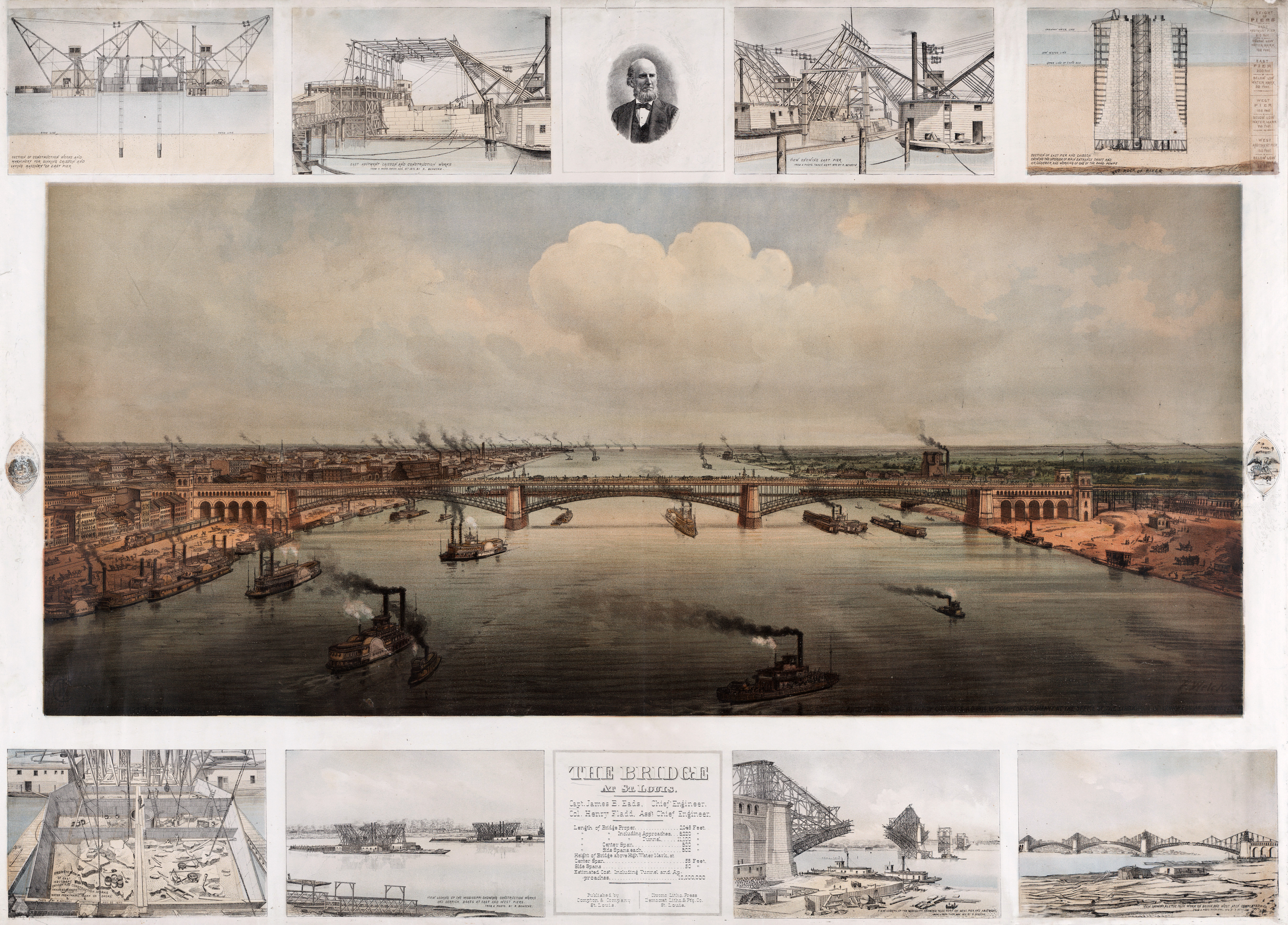
Eads Bridge, a gateway across a river

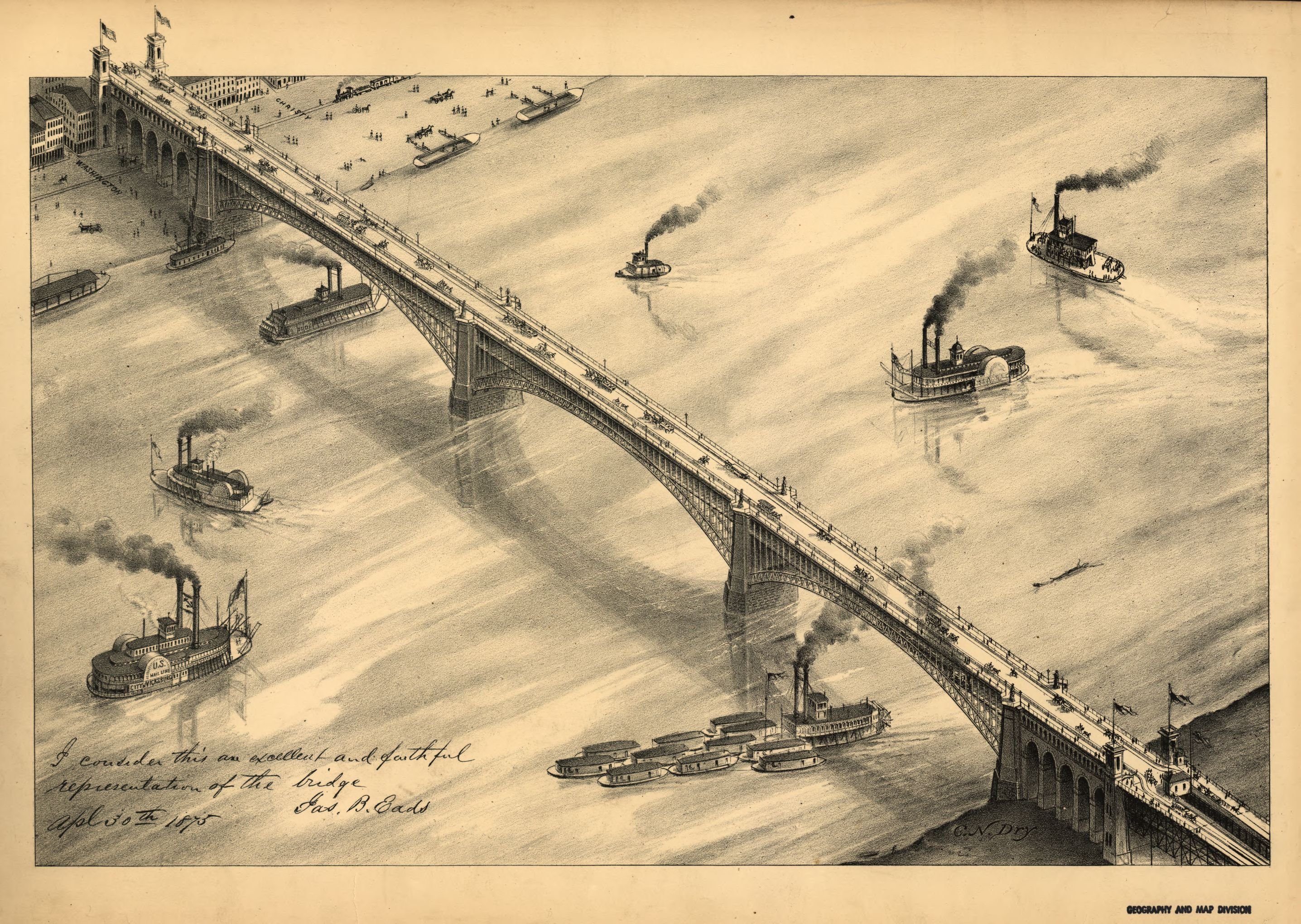
Eads Bridge, 1875

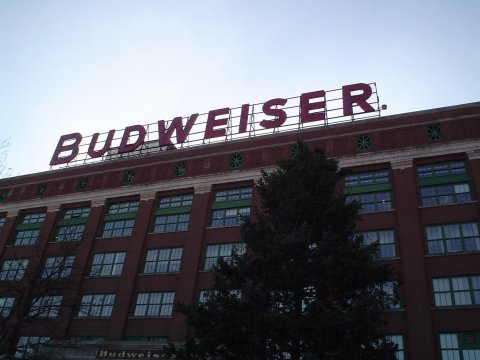
Budweiser Brewery

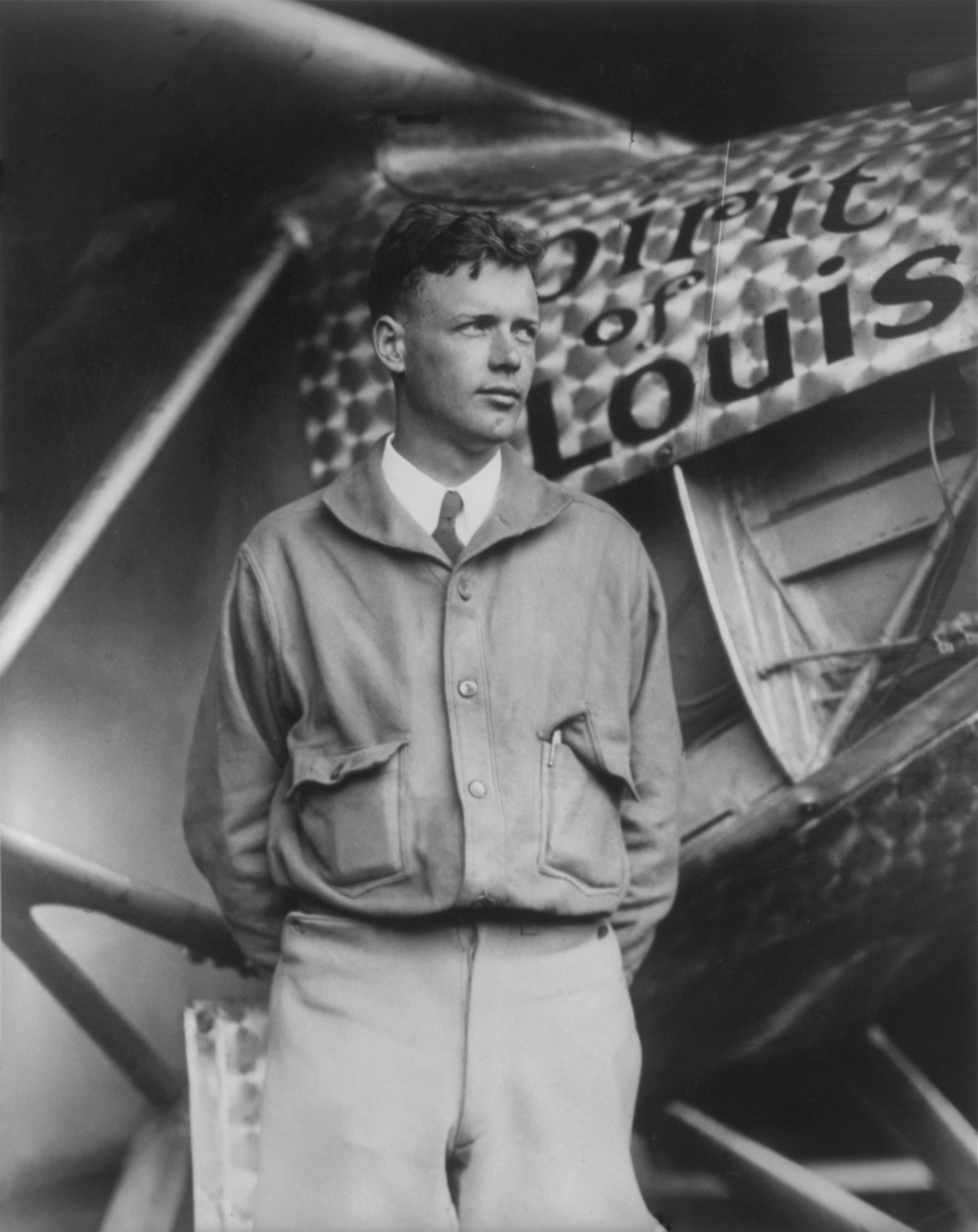
Charles Lindbergh and the Spirit of St. Louis

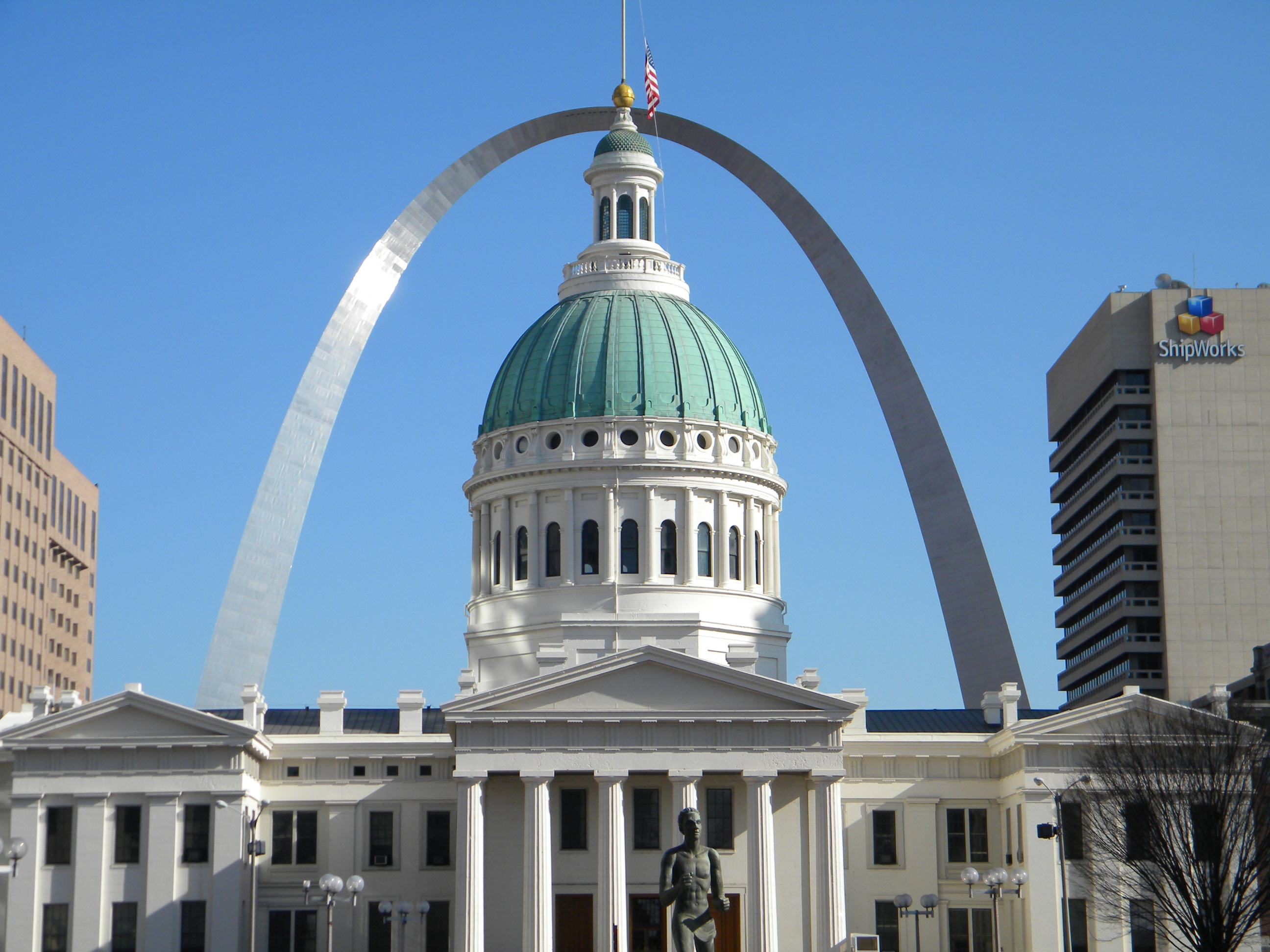
The Old Courthouse framed by the Gateway Arch – a common composition for photographs

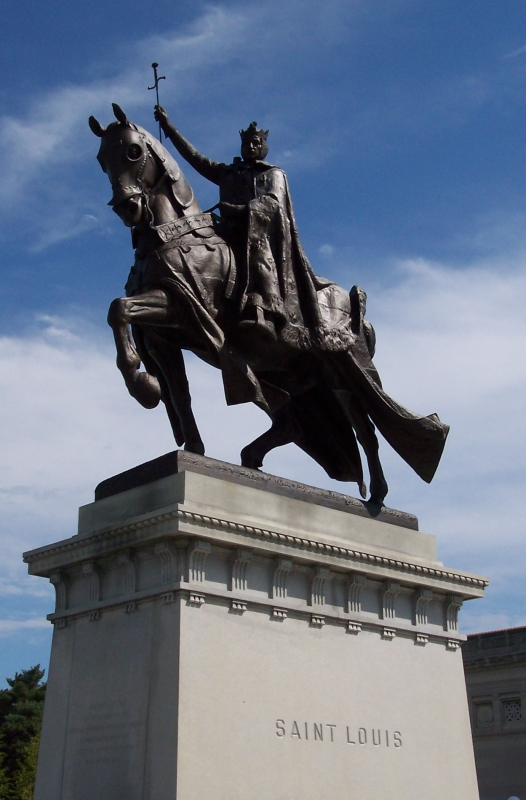
The Apotheosis of Saint Louis

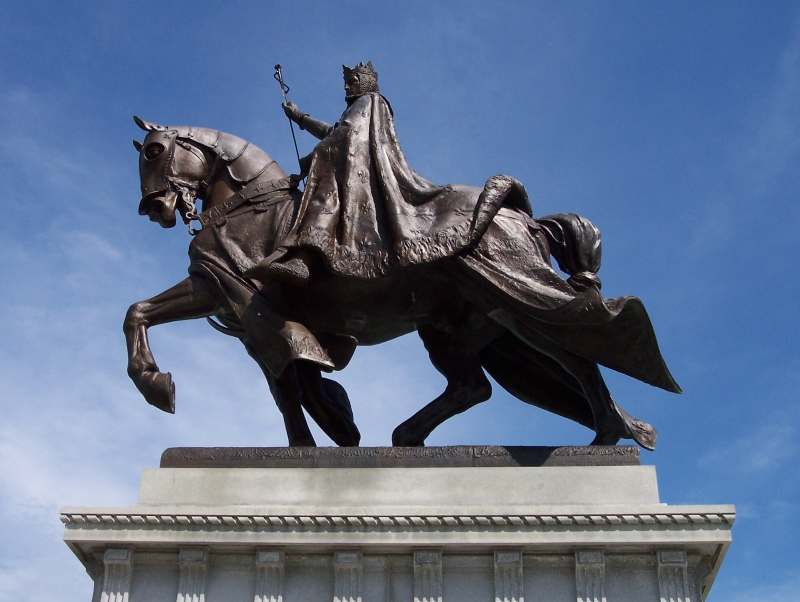
The Apotheosis of Saint Louis

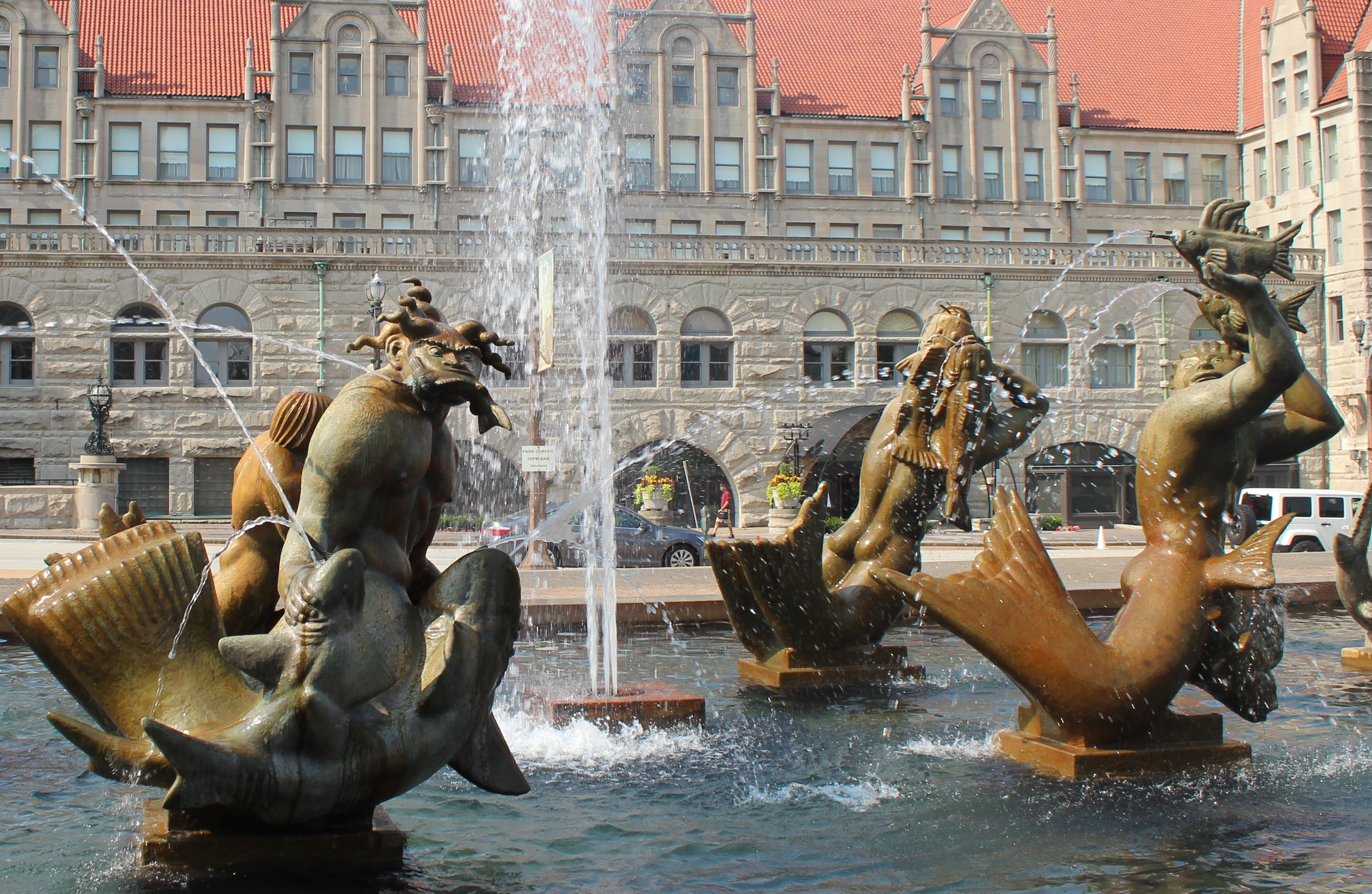
Part of Meeting of the Waters, a large sculpture in front of Union Station
