= 138th Infantry Regiment (United States) =

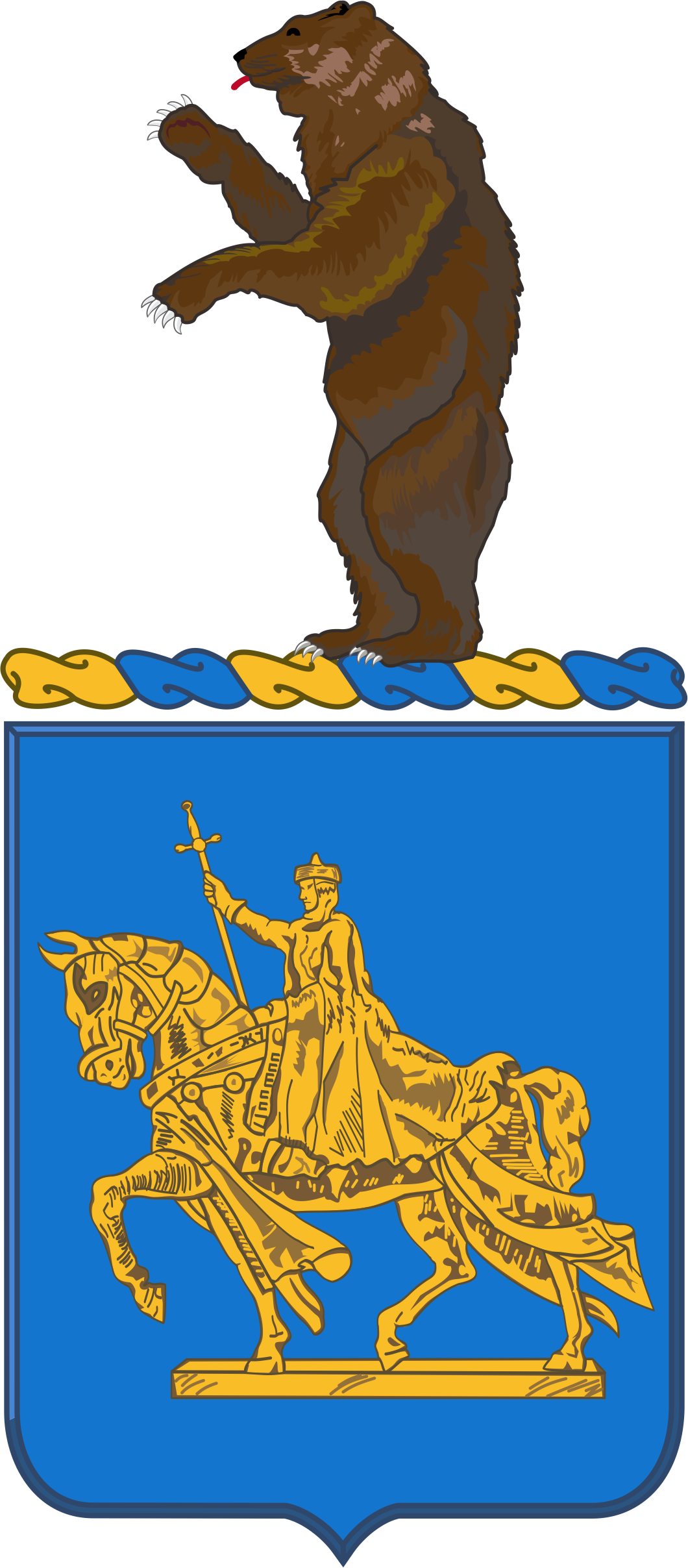
- Coat of arms
- Active: 1832-1974; 2010-present
- Country: United States
- Branch: Missouri Army National Guard
- Type: Light Infantry
- Size: Regiment
- Nickname: First Missouri
- Motto: St. Louis' Own
- Engagements: Mexican-American War; Battle of Embudo Pass; Siege of Pueblo De Taos; Battle of Sacramento (Mexico); American Civil War; Battle of Pea Ridge; Battle of Shiloh; Second Battle of Corinth; Battle of Iuka; Battle of Champion Hill; Battle of Big Black River Bridge; Siege of Vicksburg; Battle of Kennesaw Mountain; Battle of Atlanta; Battle of Ezra Church; Battle of Jonesborough; Battle of Franklin; Battle of Nashville; Battle of Fort Blakeley; Mexican Punitive Expedition; World War I; Battle of Saint-Mihiel; Alsace–Lorraine; Meuse-Argonne Offensive; World War II; Louisiana Maneuvers; Pacific Theatre; Aleutian Islands Campaign; Operation Spartan Shield; Operation Inherent Resolve; Mexican Border Service; Operation Lone Star; Operation Faithful Patriot
- Decorations: Meritorious Unit Commendation Governor's Unit Citation

Commanders
- 1st BN-138th IN REGT: LTC Timothy (TJ) Halls
- 3rd BN-138th IN REGT: LTC Miciah Pyatt

Insignia
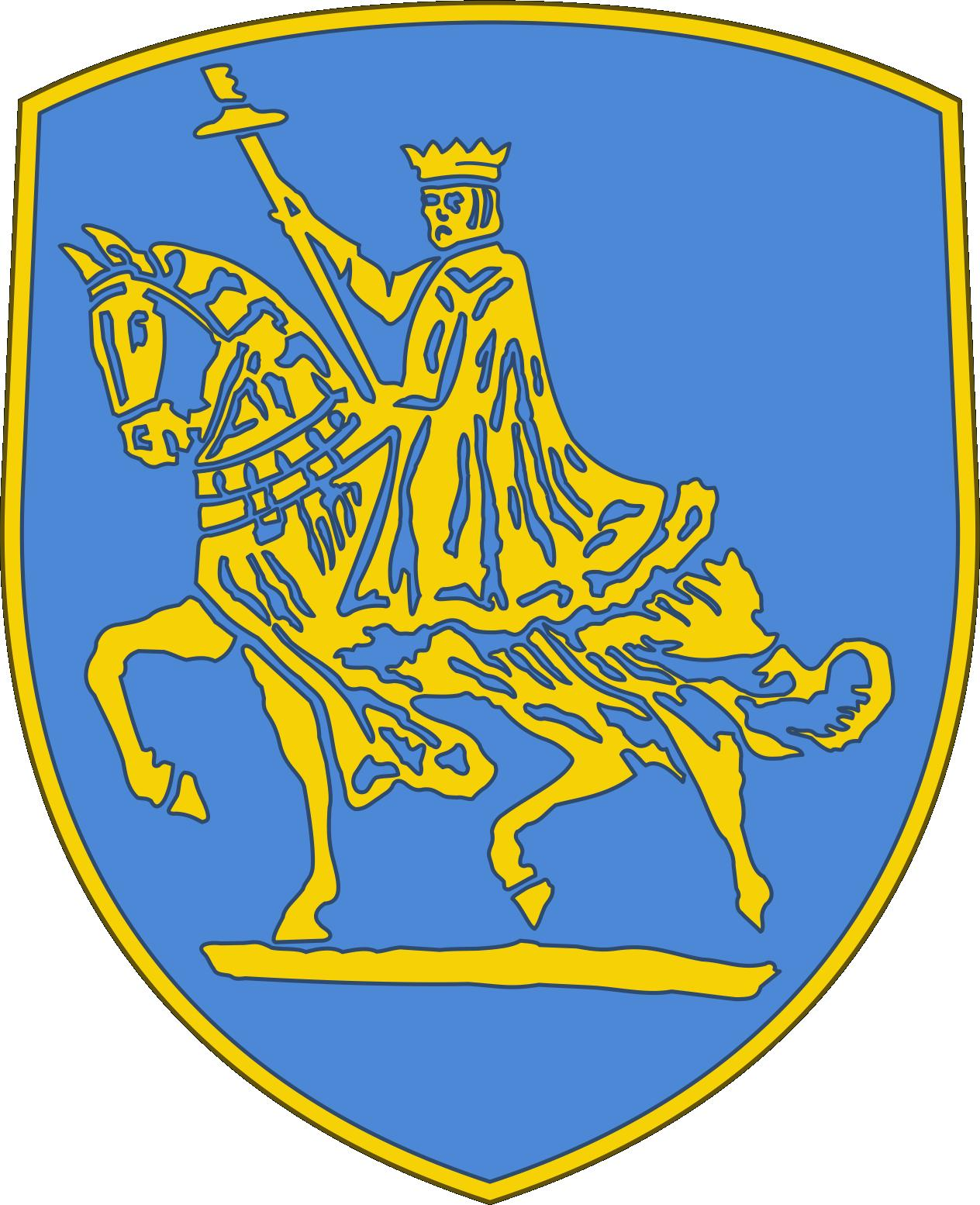
- Distinctive unit insignia

The 138th Infantry Regiment is a light infantry regiment of the United States Army and the Missouri National Guard.

There are currently two battalions within the 138th Infantry Regiment:

The 1st Battalion, 138th Infantry Regiment, headquartered at Jefferson Barracks, is a light infantry battalion assigned to the 39th Infantry Brigade Combat Team, subordinate to the 35th Infantry Division.

The 3rd Battalion, 138th Infantry Regiment, headquartered in Kansas City, Missouri, is a light infantry battalion assigned to the 72nd Infantry Brigade Combat Team (United States), subordinate to the 36th Infantry Division. As of 2024, the unit wears the 110th Maneuver Enhancement Brigade's patch until the official alignment is completed.

== History ==
The 138th Infantry Regiment traces its lineage to the St. Louis Greys, a volunteer militia company organized in 1832. The Greys first saw combat in the Mexican–American War, mustering into federal service in May 1846 as part of the St. Louis Legion. They fought at the Battles of Embudo Pass and Taos, and later took part in the occupation of Chihuahua City.

=== American Civil War and Spanish-American War ===
By 1860, the Greys were part of the 1st Missouri Infantry Regiment (Missouri Volunteer Militia), which patrolled the Missouri–Kansas border during the “Southwest Expedition.” In 1861, during the Camp Jackson Affair, Union forces captured the militia in St. Louis. Many members subsequently joined the Missouri State Guard and reorganized at Memphis as the 1st Missouri Infantry Regiment (Confederate), part of the renowned 1st Missouri Brigade.

The regiment fought in nearly every major Western Theater campaign of the Civil War, including Shiloh, Iuka, Corinth, Champion Hill, the Siege of Vicksburg, the Atlanta campaign, Franklin, Nashville, and Fort Blakeley, where it surrendered in April 1865.

Reorganized after the war, the unit became the 1st Regiment, Missouri National Guard. In 1898, nearly every member volunteered for the Spanish–American War, but the regiment never deployed overseas. The Militia Act of 1903 and National Defense Act of 1916 integrated Missouri's Guard into the federal system.

=== World War I ===
In World War I, the First and Fifth Missouri Regiments were consolidated as the 138th Infantry Regiment, 35th Division. The regiment fought in the Vosges Mountains, the St. Mihiel Offensive, and the Meuse–Argonne Offensive, where it advanced through Vauquois, Cheppy, and Exermont with Colonel George S. Patton's tanks. Two members, Captain Alexander Skinker and Private Nels Wold, earned the Medal of Honor.

=== Interwar period and World War II ===
The 138th Infantry arrived at the port of Newport News, Virginia, on 28 April 1919 on the USS Aeolus and was demobilized on 12 May 1919 at Camp Grant, Illinois. It was reconstituted in the National Guard in 1921, assigned to the 35th Division, and allotted to Missouri. It was reorganized 1 October 1921 by redesignation of the 1st Infantry, Missouri National Guard (organized 14 April 1921; headquarters concurrently organized and federally recognized at St. Louis) as the 138th Infantry. The regiment, or elements thereof, was called up to perform the following state duties: 1st Battalion for riot control during a railroad workers’ strike at Poplar Bluff, Missouri, in July 1922; tornado relief duties in St. Louis, 29 September–6 October 1927. It conducted annual summer training most years at Camp Clark, Missouri, from 1921 to 1939. For at least 3 years (1938–40), the regiment also trained some 89 company-grade infantry officers of the 102nd Division at Camp Clark and Camp Ripley, Minnesota. It was inducted into active federal service on 23 December 1940, and moved to Camp Joseph T. Robinson, Arkansas, where it arrived 5 January 1941.

During World War II, the 138th was deployed to Alaska and the Aleutian Islands campaign, where it manned defenses and constructed outposts on Adak and Atka islands. The regiment was returned to the continental United States and inactivated in July 1944 at Camp Shelby, Mississippi, with its soldiers reassigned as replacements.

=== Cold War to present ===
After the war, the regiment was reorganized in St. Louis but reduced to a single battalion by 1963. Its lineage was transferred to the 1138th Engineer Battalion in 1974. The regiment was reactivated in 2010 as the 1st Battalion, with its colors uncased in 2015. The 3rd Battalion, 138th Infantry was reestablished in 2022, headquartered in Kansas City.

2017 Operation Enduring Freedom - OSS Deployment

1st Battalion, 138th Infantry Regiment deployed to Qatar in 2017 in support of Operation Enduring Freedom (Spartan Shield) to provide force protection of U.S. military assets and was there during the turbulent beginning of the GCC-Qatar Crisis. The battalion conducted security operations and was tasked with Quick Reaction Force responsibilities at various outposts in the region, but mainly in the base of Camp As Sayliyah, Qatar.

2023 Operation Spartan Shield/Operation Inherent Resolve Deployment

An element of 1st Battalion, 138th Infantry Regiment deployed in May 2023 in support of Operation Spartan Shield & Operation Inherent Resolve where for the first time in over a decade, 39 Missouri National Guard Infantryman received their Combat Infantryman Badge's for Combat Operations and engaging in multiple firefight's during Operation Inherent Resolve while stationed in RLZ, Syria at a ceremony in December 2023 in Camp Buehring, Kuwait, the unit at that time was attached to the 155th Armored Brigade Combat Team assigned to Task Force Reaper.

=== Current Unit Structure and Locations of the 138th ===
1st Battalion, 138th Infantry Regiment

- Headquarters & Headquarters Company/HHC - Jefferson Barracks
- Alpha Company - Mexico, MO
- Bravo Company - Bridgeton, MO
- Charlie Company - Perryville, MO
- Delta Company - Sikeston, MO

3rd Battalion, 138th Infantry Regiment

- Headquarters & Headquarters Company/HHC - Kansas City, MO
- Alpha Company - Booneville, MO
- Bravo Company - Lamar, MO
- Charlie Company - West Plains, MO
- Delta Company - Clinton, MO

=== Command Teams ===
1st Battalion Commanders

- LTC Kevin Fujimoto (2008–2011)
- LTC Levon Cumpton (2011–2013)
- LTC Martin Clay (2013–2015)
- LTC Douglas McConnell (2015–2018)
- LTC Tom Pickle (2018–2020)
- LTC Peter J. McCann (2020–2023)
- LTC Shawn Edwards (2023–2024)
- LTC Timothy (TJ) Halls (2024-Current)

1st Battalion Command Sergeants Major

- CSM Scott Kennedy (2008–2009)
- CSM Larry Godsey (2009–2018)
- CSM Don Lilleman (2018–2021)
- CSM Wes Blanscet (2021–2022)
- CSM Eric Jordan (2022-Current)

3rd Battalion Commanders

- LTC Tyson K Erdman (2022–2025)
- LTC Miciah Pyatt (2025-Current)

3rd Battalion Command Sergeants Major

- CSM Wes Blanscet (2022-Current)

== Notable Members of the Regiment ==
- Captain Alexander R. Skinker, Medal of Honor, WWI
- Private Nels Wold, Medal of Honor, WWI

== Lineage ==
Organized in 1832 in the Missouri Militia at St. Louis as the St. Louis Greys

- Consolidated in 1843 with existing units in St. Louis to form the Regiment of St. Louis Militia
- Mustered into federal service 18 May 1846 at St. Louis as the St. Louis Legion; mustered out of federal service 25 August 1846 at St. Louis
- Reorganized as Easton's Battalion of Infantry and mustered into federal service 10–24 May 1847 at St. Louis
- Mustered out of federal service 9–10 October 1848 at St. Louis; battalion (less St. Louis Greys) concurrently disbanded
- St. Louis Greys consolidated in 1852 with existing companies in St. Louis to form the 1st Missouri Infantry Regiment
- 1st Missouri Infantry Regiment captured by Union Forces 10 May 1861 at Camp Jackson, Missouri
- Elements of former 1st Missouri Infantry Regiment consolidated 22 June 1861 with elements of former 2d Missouri Infantry Regiment (organized in February 1861 at St. Louis; captured by Union forces 10 May 1861 at Camp Jackson, Missouri) and consolidated elements reorganized in Confederate service at Memphis, Tennessee in September 1861, as the 1st Missouri Infantry Regiment, 1st Missouri Brigade
- Consolidated 1 November 1862 with the 4th Missouri Infantry Regiment (organized 30 April 1862 in Confederate service near Corinth, Mississippi) and consolidated unit designated as the 1st and 4th Consolidated Missouri Infantry Regiment
- Surrendered 9 April 1865 at Fort Blakeley, Alabama
- Disbanded 10 May 1865 at Jackson, Mississippi
- Former 1st Missouri Infantry Regiment reconstituted in 1869 in the Missouri Militia at St. Louis as the 1st Regiment
- Disbanded 21 April 1874. (Missouri Militia redesignated 16 March 1877 as the Missouri National Guard)
- Reconstituted 16 August 1879 in the Missouri National Guard; concurrently, consolidated with the St. Louis National Guard Battalion (see ANNEX 1) and consolidated unit designated as the 1st Regiment
- Consolidated 27 June 1884 with the 3d Regiment (see ANNEX 2) and consolidated unit designated as the 1st Regiment
- Disbanded 23 May 1887 at St. Louis
- Reconstituted in 1887 in the Missouri National Guard as a battalion
- Expanded, reorganized, and redesignated, 8 October 1888 as the 1st Regiment
- Mustered into federal service 13 May 1898 at St. Louis as the 1st Missouri Volunteer Infantry;
- mustered out of federal service 31 October 1898 at St. Louis
- Disbanded 21 August 1899 at St. Louis
- Reconstituted 18 September 1899 in the Missouri National Guard at St. Louis as the 1st Infantry
- Mustered into federal service 18 June 1916 at St. Louis; mustered out of federal service 25 September 1916 at Nevada
- Called into federal service 25 March 1917 at St. Louis; drafted into federal service 5 August 1917
- Consolidated 1 October 1917 with the 5th Infantry, Missouri National Guard (organized 21 May 1917 at St. Louis) and consolidated unit designated as the 138th Infantry, an element of the 35th Division
- Demobilized 12 May 1919 at Fort Riley, Kansas
- Former 1st Infantry reorganized and federally recognized 14 April 1921 with headquarters at St. Louis (former 5th Infantry hereafter separate lineage)
- Reorganized and redesignated 1 October 1921 as the 138th Infantry and assigned to the 35th Division
- Inducted into federal service 23 December 1940 at St. Louis
- Relieved 1 March 1942 from assignment to the 35th Division
- Inactivated 20 July 1944 at Camp Shelby, Mississippi
- Assigned 20 June 1946 to the 35th Infantry Division
- Reorganized and federally recognized 22 October 1946 in the Missouri National Guard as the 138th Infantry with headquarters at St. Louis
- Reorganized and redesignated 15 April 1959 as the 138th Infantry, a parent regiment under the Combat Arms Regimental System, to consist of the 1st Battle Group, an element of the 35th Infantry Division
- Reorganized 1 April 1963 to consist of the 1st Battalion
- Converted, reorganized, and redesignated 1 May 1974 as the 1138th Engineer Battalion
- Consolidated 1 September 1993 with Headquarters and Headquarters Detachment, 880th Engineer Battalion (see ANNEX 3) and consolidated unit designated as Headquarters and Headquarters Detachment, 1138th Engineer Battalion
- Ordered into active federal service 15 March 2003 at St. Louis; released from active federal service 24 July 2004 and reverted to state control
- Converted, reorganized, and redesignated 1 September 2006 as the 135th Support Detachment; concurrently, location changed to St. Louis
- Ordered into active federal service 30 April 2008 at St. Louis; released from active federal service 8 May 2009 and reverted to state control
- Converted, reorganized, and redesignated 1 September 2010 as the 1st Battalion, 138th Infantry Regiment with headquarters at Kansas City

=== Annex 1 ===
Organized 26 July 1852 in the Missouri Militia at St. Louis as the National Guards

- Expanded 28 July 1858 to form two companies
- Converted, reorganized, and redesignated in June 1860 as the Engineer Corps of Missouri
- Captured by Union forces 10 May 1861 at Camp Jackson, Missouri
- Reorganized 14 February 1872 at St. Louis as the Company of National Guards
- Mustered into state service 9 April 1878 as the St. Louis National Guard Battalion

=== Annex 2 ===
Organized 7 November 1877 in the Missouri National Guard at St. Louis as the 1st Regiment of Police Reserves

- Mustered into state service 21 November 1881 as the 3d Regiment

=== Annex 3 ===
Constituted 14 December 1942 in the Army of the United States as the 880th Airborne Engineer Battalion, Aviation

- Activated 1 March 1943 at Westover Field, Massachusetts
- Redesignated 24 March 1943 as the 880th Airborne Engineer Aviation Battalion
- Disbanded 21 December 1944 on New Guinea
- Reconstituted 6 March 1952 in the Air National Guard as the 880th Engineer Aviation Battalion, and allotted to Missouri, Louisiana, and Colorado
- Organized 1952–1954 with headquarters federally recognized 26 January 1954 at St. Louis, Missouri

(Federal recognition withdrawn 1 April 1954 from Company C [Colorado Air National Guard]; Company B [Louisiana Air National Guard] redesignated 1 September 1954 as Company B, 225th Engineer Aviation Battalion – hereafter separate lineage)

- Redesignated 15 January 1957 as the 880th Engineer Battalion and allotted to the Missouri Army National Guard
- Battalion broken up 15 January 1968 and its elements reorganized and redesignated as follows:
- Headquarters and Headquarters Company as Headquarters and Headquarters Detachment, 880th Engineer Battalion
- (Company A as the 1135th Military Police Company; Company B as the 202d Engineer Company; Company C as Company B, 110th Engineer Battalion – hereafter separate lineages)

=== Annex 4 ===
Modern Day

- 3rd Battalion, 138th Infantry Regiment reactivated in Kansas City, MO September 1, 2022
- Unit Reorganizations and Relocations between the years of 2021 and 2024 to allocate the reactivate of the 3rd Battalion

== Distinctive unit insignia ==
=== Description ===
A Gold color metal and enamel device 1 3/32 inches (2.78 cm) in height consisting of a shield blazoned: Azure, the equestrian statue in profile of Louis IX (St. Louis) of France Or, (the statue is in Forest Park, St. Louis, by Charles Henry Niehaus).

=== Symbolism ===
The shield is blue for Infantry. The statue of Louis IX (St. Louis) alludes to the home area of the organization.

=== Background ===
The distinctive unit insignia was originally approved for the 138th Infantry Regiment on 24 May 1926. It was redesignated for the 1138th Engineer Battalion on 3 May 1989.

== Coat of arms ==
- Blazon
  - Shield: Azure, the equestrian statue in profile of Louis IX (St. Louis) of France Or, (the statue is in forest Park, St. Louis, by C.H. Niehaus).
  - Crest: That for the regiments and separate battalions of the Missouri Army National Guard: On a wreath of the colors Or and Azure, a grizzly bear rampant Proper. **Motto: ST. LOUIS' OWN.
- Symbolism
  - Shield: The shield is blue for Infantry. The statue of Louis IX (St. Louis) alludes to the home area of the organization.
  - Crest: The crest is that of the Missouri Army National Guard.
- Background: The coat of arms was originally approved for the 138th Infantry Regiment on 8 July 1922. It was amended to correct the blazon on 11 October 1923. It was redesignated for 1138th Engineer Battalion on 3 May 1989.

== Campaign streamers ==
Mexican-American War	Operations / Campaigns
	New Mexico 1847
	Chihuahua 1848

Civil War (Confederate Service)
	Shiloh 1862
	Mississippi 1862
	Louisiana 1863
	Mississippi River 1863
	Vicksburg 1863
	Alabama 1864
	Atlanta 1864
	Nashville 1864
	Alabama 1865

Mexican Punitive Expedition
	Laredo, Texas 1916

World War I
	Battle of St. Mihiel 1918
	Meuse-Argonne 1918 (Includes Alsace-Lorraine Defense)

World War II
	Aleutian Islands Campaign 1942 - 1943

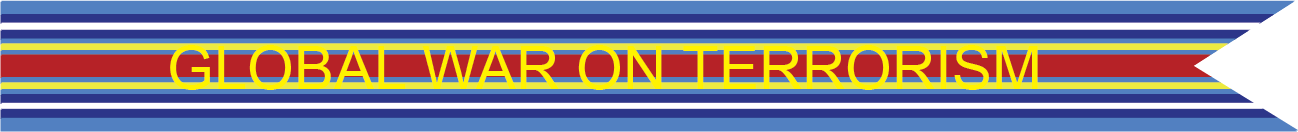
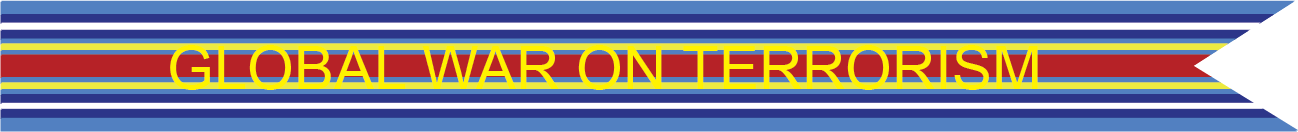
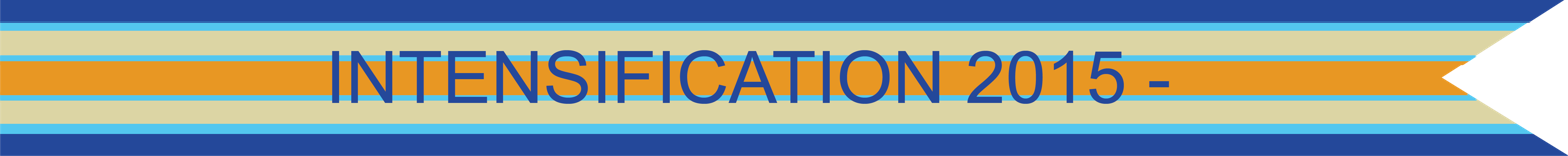
Global War on Terrorism
	Operation Enduring Freedom - Qatar 2017 - 2018
	Operation Spartan Shield - Kuwait 2023 - 2024
	Operation Inherent Resolve 2023 - 2024

== Decorations ==
- Meritorious Unit Commendation (Army), Streamer embroidered SOUTHWEST ASIA 2003–2004
- Meritorious Unit Commendation (Army), Streamer embroidered SOUTHWEST ASIA 2017
- Missouri National Guard Governor's Unit Citation (MOARNG)

== See also ==
- Apotheosis of St. Louis
