= Winger, Minnesota =

City in Minnesota, United States

Winger
- City
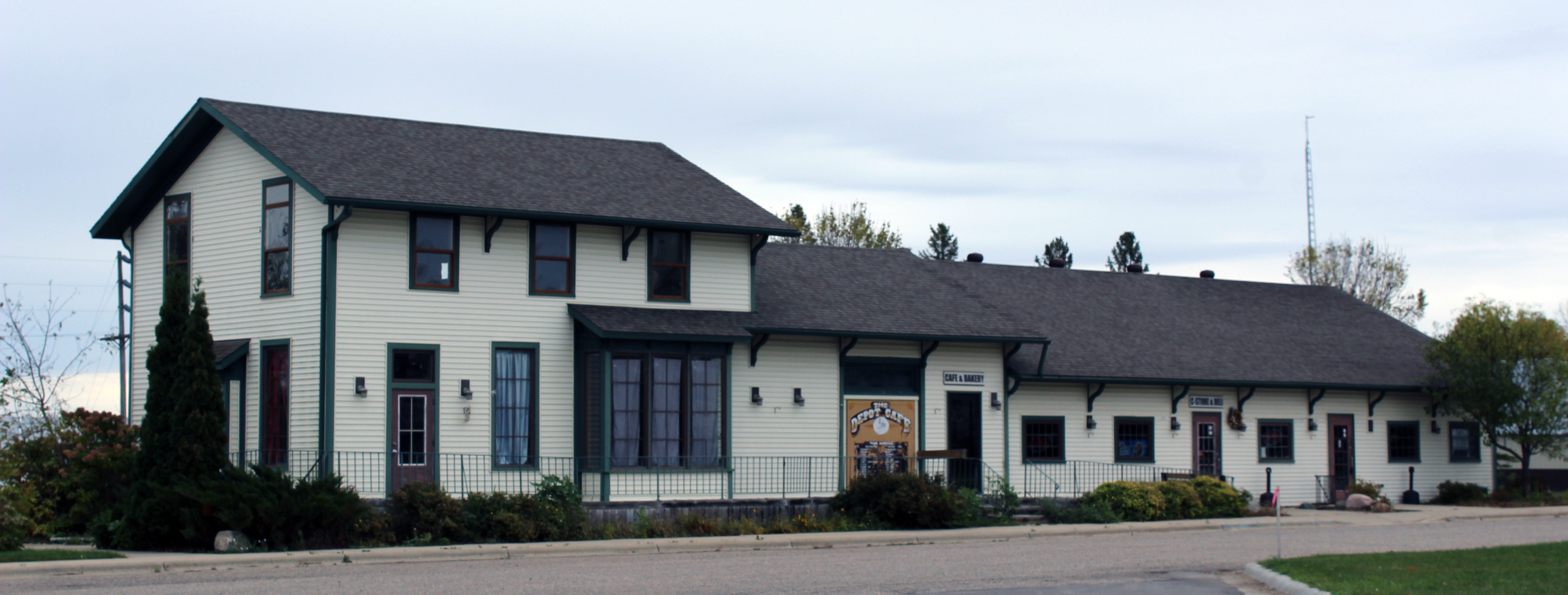
- Train depot (former)

- Location of Winger, Minnesota
- Coordinates: 47°32′11″N 95°59′09″W
- Country: United States
- State: Minnesota
- County: Polk

Area
  - Total: 0.32 sq mi (0.84 km^{2})
  - Land: 0.32 sq mi (0.84 km^{2})
  - Water: 0 sq mi (0.00 km^{2})
- Elevation: 1,234 ft (376 m)

Population (2020)
  - Total: 174
  - Estimate (2021): 174
  - Density: 536.8/sq mi (207.26/km^{2})
- Time zone: UTC-6 (CST)
  - Summer (DST): UTC-5 (CDT)
- ZIP code: 56592
- Area code: 218
- FIPS code: 27-70870
- GNIS feature ID: 2397346

Winger is a city in Polk County, Minnesota, United States. It is part of the Grand Forks, ND-MN Metropolitan Statistical Area. The population was 174 at the 2020 census.

== Geography ==
According to the United States Census Bureau, the city has a total area of 0.44 square miles (1.14 km^{2}), all land.

== Demographics ==
Historical population
Census	Pop.	Note	%±
1930	258		—
1940	301		16.7%
1950	283		−6.0%
1960	292		3.2%
1970	228		−21.9%
1980	200		−12.3%
1990	165		−17.5%
2000	205		24.2%
2010	220		7.3%
2020	174		−20.9%
2021 (est.)	174		0.0%
U.S. Decennial Census; 2020 Census

=== 2010 census ===
As of the census of 2010, there were 220 people, 91 households, and 49 families living in the city. The population density was 500.0 inhabitants per square mile (193.1/km^{2}). There were 109 housing units at an average density of 247.7 per square mile (95.6/km^{2}). The racial makeup of the city was 96.4% White, 2.3% Native American, 0.5% Asian, and 0.9% from two or more races.

There were 91 households, of which 35.2% had children under the age of 18 living with them, 31.9% were married couples living together, 18.7% had a female householder with no husband present, 3.3% had a male householder with no wife present, and 46.2% were non-families. 42.9% of all households were made up of individuals, and 16.5% had someone living alone who was 65 years of age or older. The average household size was 2.42 and the average family size was 3.41.

The median age in the city was 33.7 years. 31.4% of residents were under the age of 18; 9.8% were between the ages of 18 and 24; 24.1% were from 25 to 44; 20% were from 45 to 64; and 14.5% were 65 years of age or older. The gender makeup of the city was 50.9% male and 49.1% female.

=== 2000 census ===
As of the census of 2000, there were 205 people, 94 households, and 53 families living in the city. The population density was 586.4 inhabitants per square mile (226.4/km^{2}). There were 105 housing units at an average density of 300.4 per square mile (116.0/km^{2}). The racial makeup of the city was 93.17% White, 2.44% Native American, and 4.39% from two or more races.

There were 94 households, out of which 30.9% had children under the age of 18 living with them, 41.5% were married couples living together, 12.8% had a female householder with no husband present, and 43.6% were non-families. 41.5% of all households were made up of individuals, and 20.2% had someone living alone who was 65 years of age or older. The average household size was 2.18 and the average family size was 3.00.

In the city, the population was spread out, with 27.3% under the age of 18, 8.8% from 18 to 24, 23.9% from 25 to 44, 20.0% from 45 to 64, and 20.0% who were 65 years of age or older. The median age was 34 years. For every 100 females, there were 109.2 males. For every 100 females age 18 and over, there were 91.0 males.

The median income for a household in the city was $21,146, and the median income for a family was $30,000. Males had a median income of $21,750 versus $20,156 for females. The per capita income for the city was $11,707. About 13.5% of families and 14.5% of the population were below the poverty line, including 12.1% of those under the age of eighteen and 12.2% of those 65 or over.

== Gallery ==
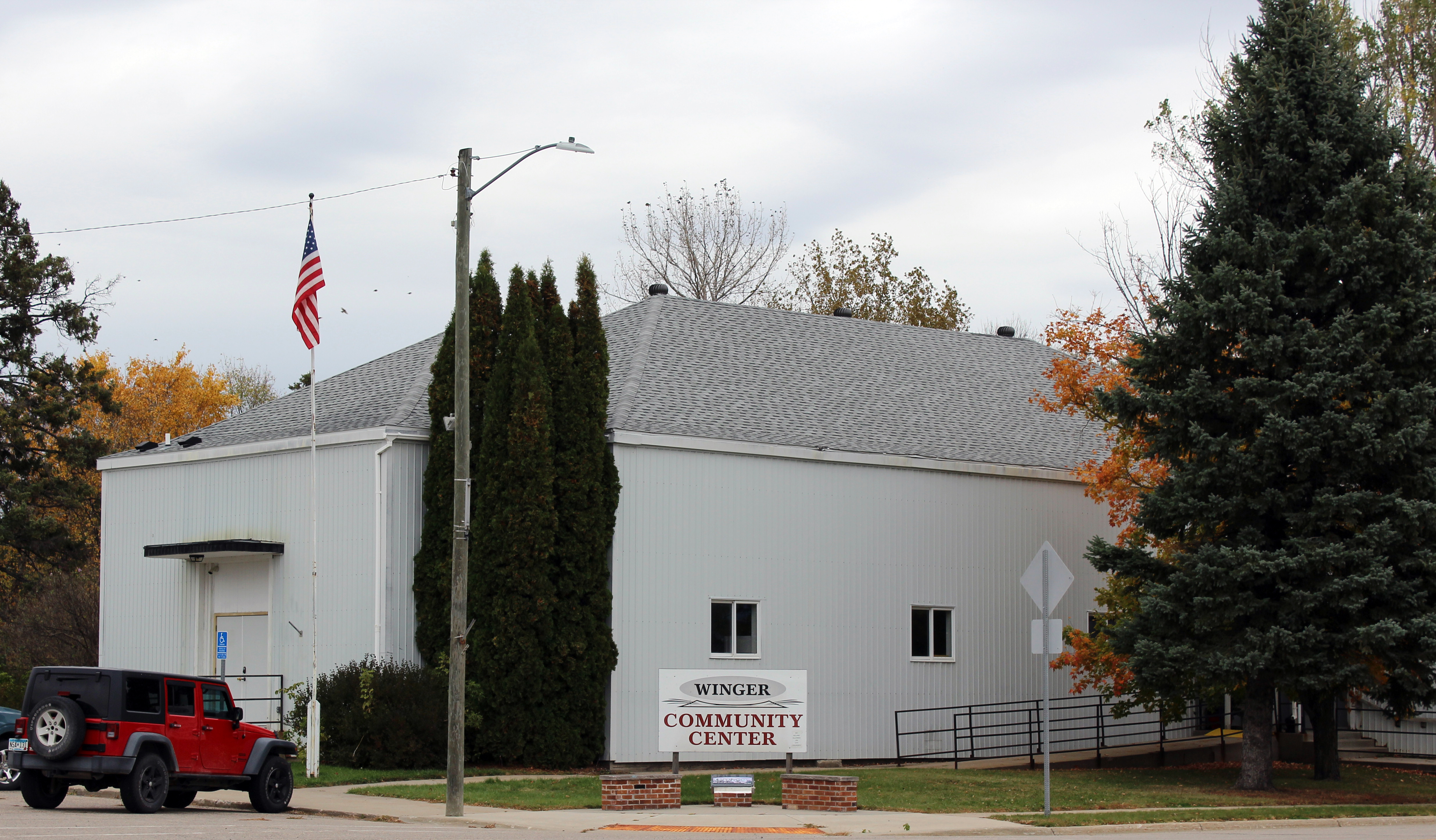
Community Center

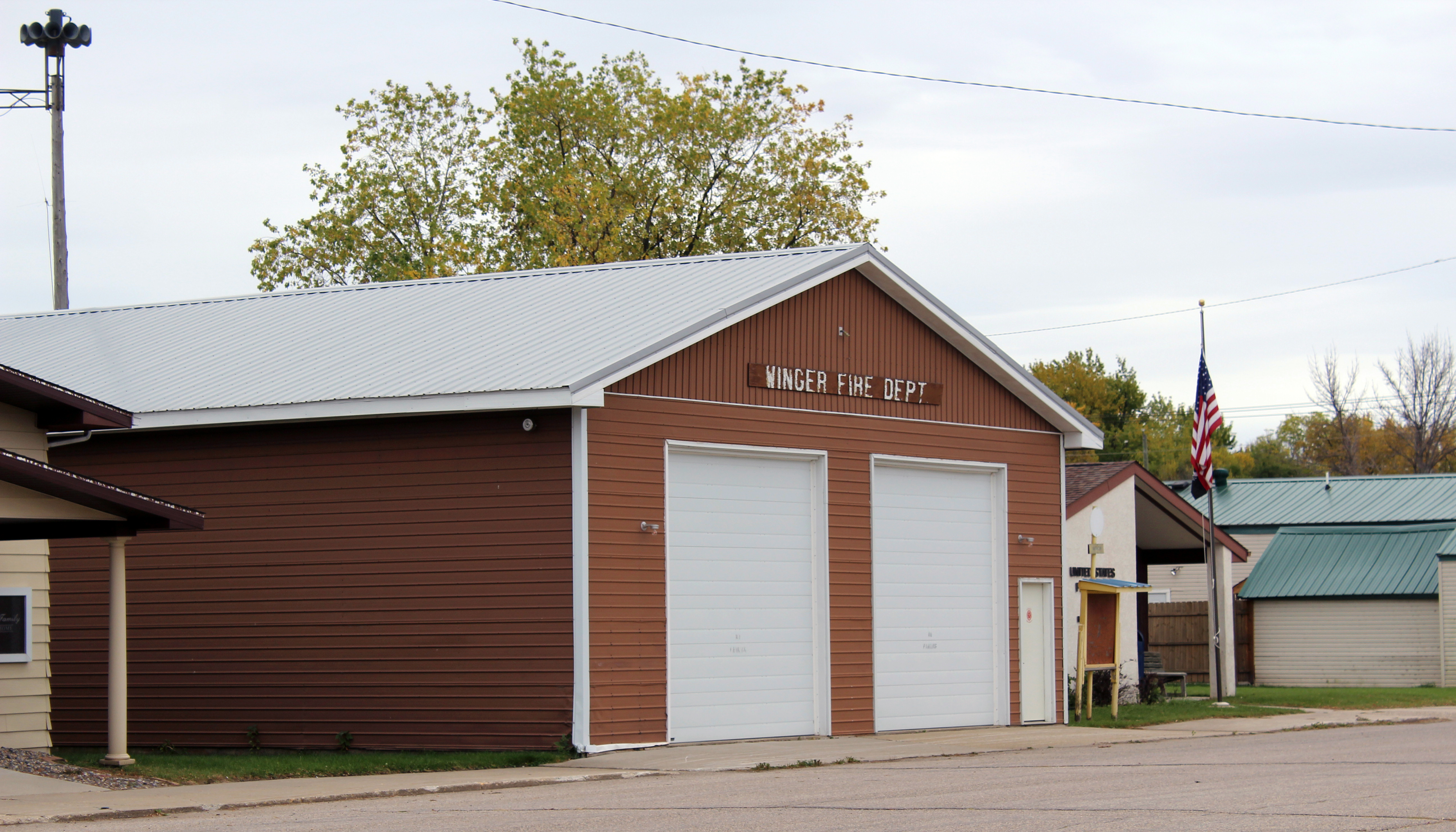
Fire Department

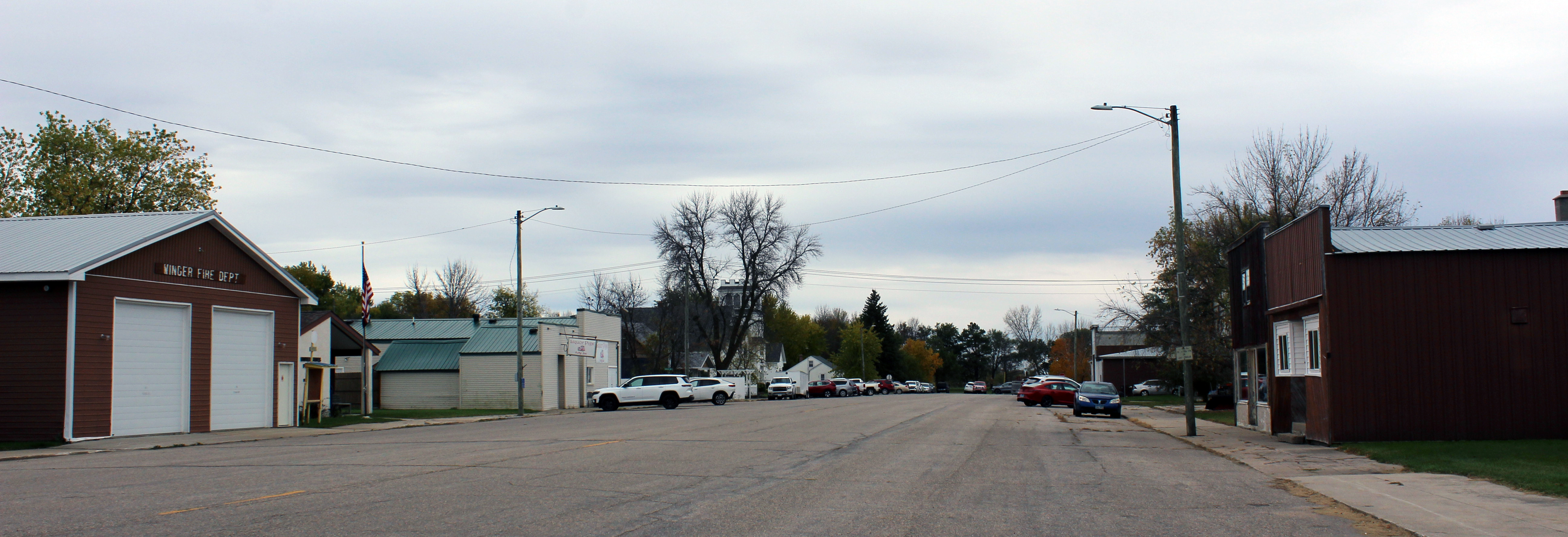
Main Street

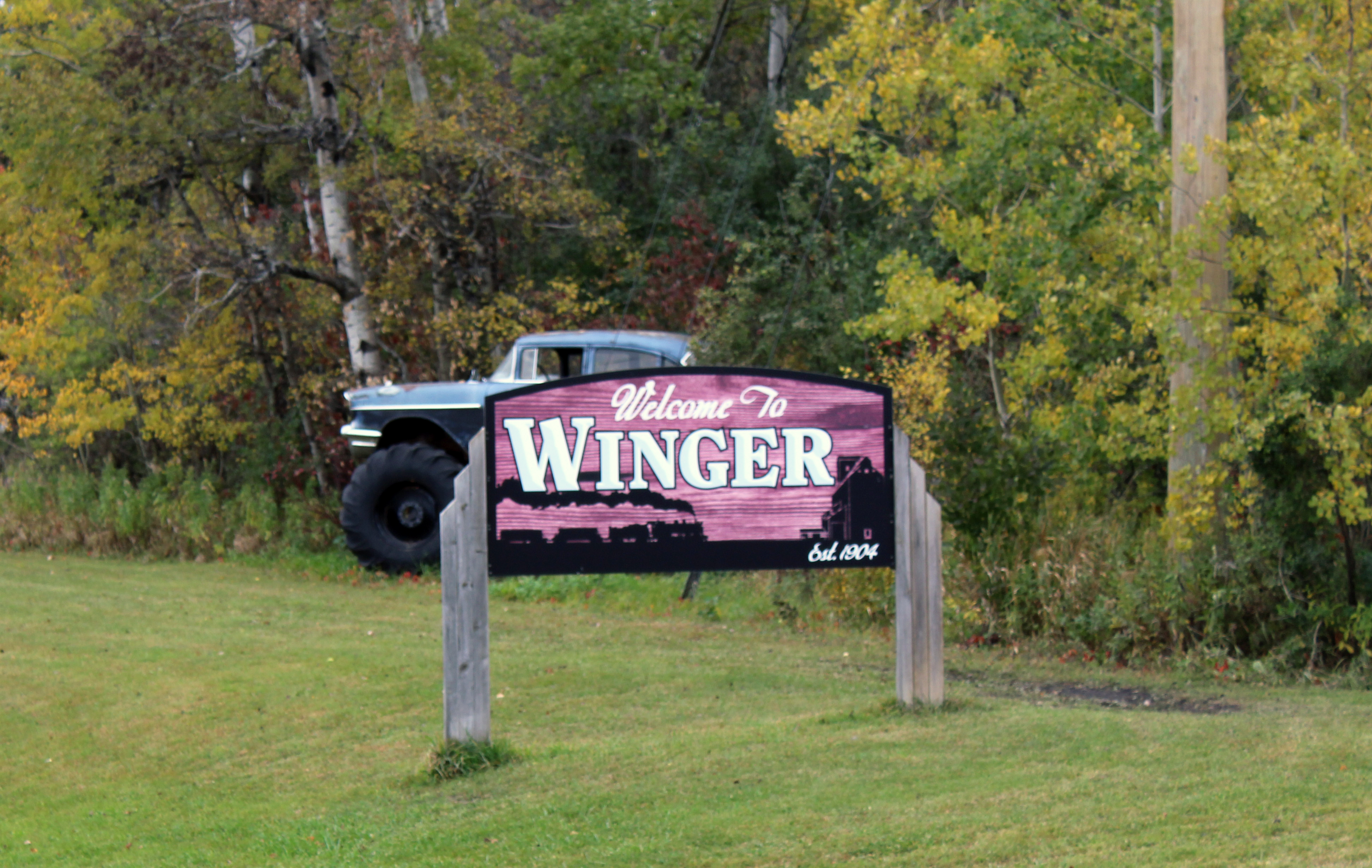
Welcome sign

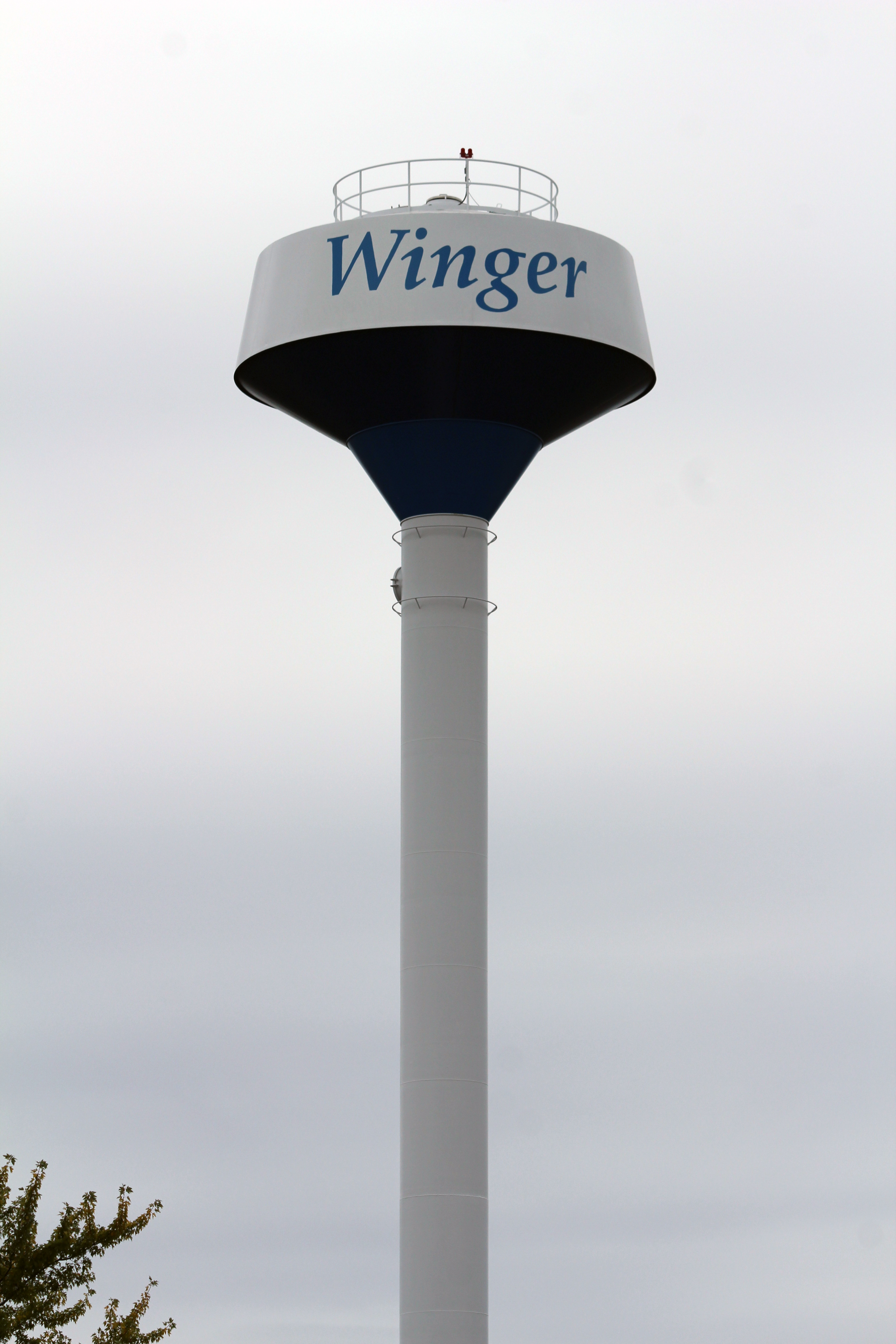
Water tower
