= Cheppy =

- Commune
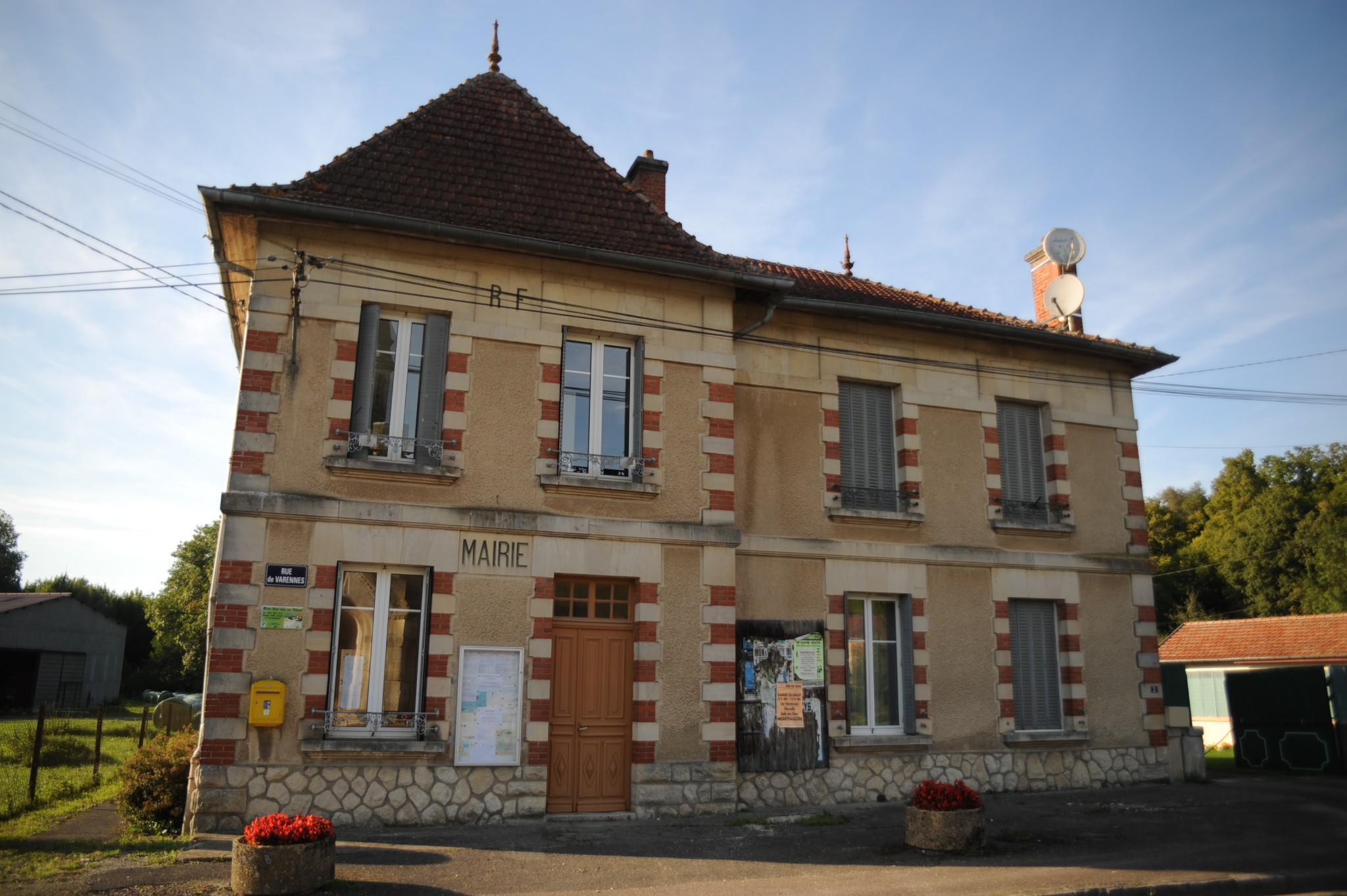
- The town hall in Cheppy

- Coat of arms
- Location of Cheppy
- Location within France Location within Grand Est
- Coordinates: 49°13′57″N 5°03′32″E
- Country: France
- Region: Grand Est
- Department: Meuse
- Arrondissement: Verdun
- Canton: Clermont-en-Argonne
- Intercommunality: Argonne-Meuse

Government
  - Mayor (2020–2026): Jean-François Lamorlette
- Area^{1}: 14.83 km^{2} (5.73 sq mi)
- Elevation: 169 m (554 ft)
- Highest elevation: 239 m (784 ft)
- Lowest elevation: 155 m (509 ft)
- Population (2023): 156
  - Density: 10.5/km^{2} (27.2/sq mi)
- Time zone: UTC+01:00 (CET)
  - Summer (DST): UTC+02:00 (CEST)
- INSEE/Postal code: 55113 /55270
- ^{1} French Land Register data, which excludes lakes, ponds, glaciers > 1 km^{2} (0.386 sq mi or 247 acres) and river estuaries.

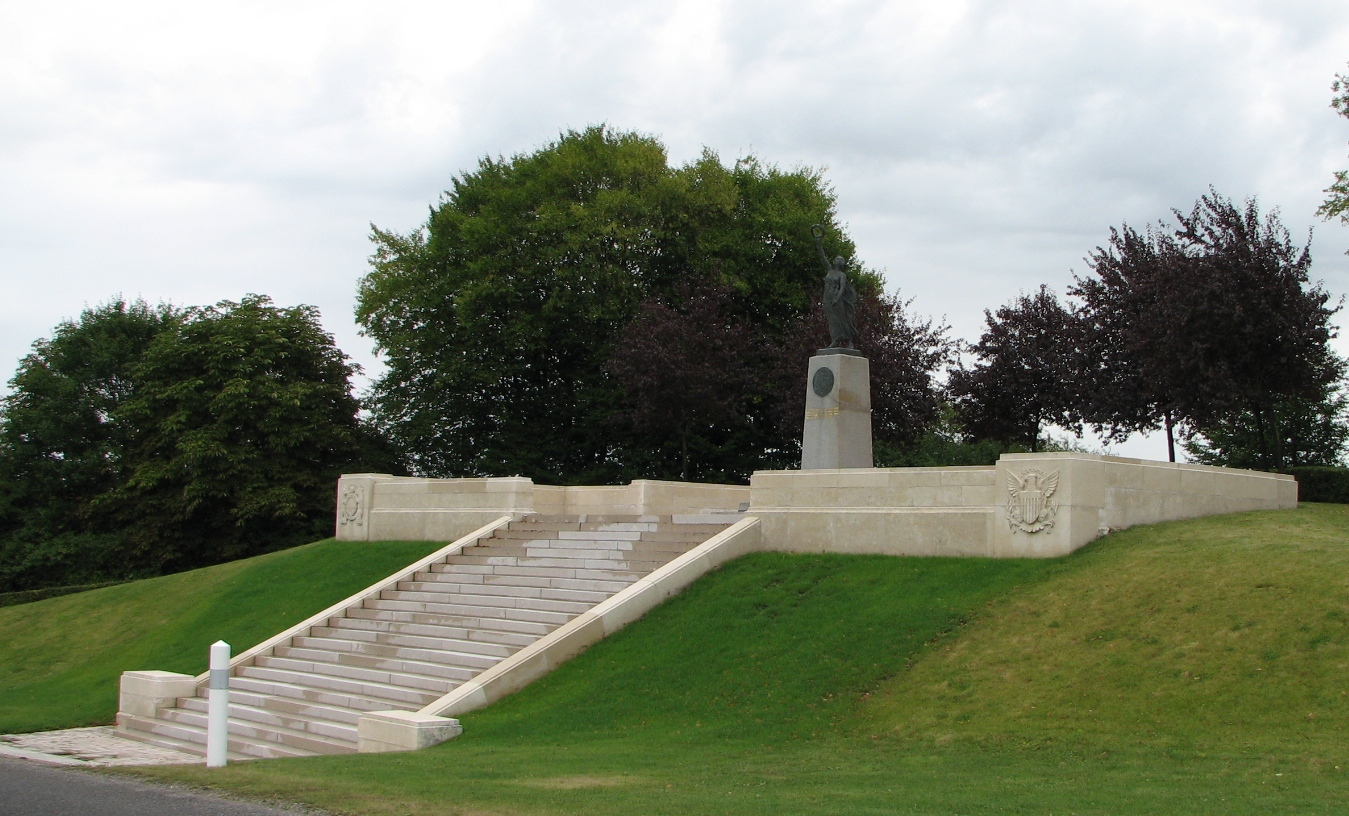
Monument of Missouri

Cheppy (French pronunciation: [ʃɛpi]) is a commune in the Meuse department in Grand Est in northeastern France.

It was a site of fighting during World War I. An American monument sculpted by Nancy Coonsman was erected there by the State of Missouri after the war to honor the volunteers of the state.

== Environment ==
- Cheppy wood
- Valley and banks of the Buanthe
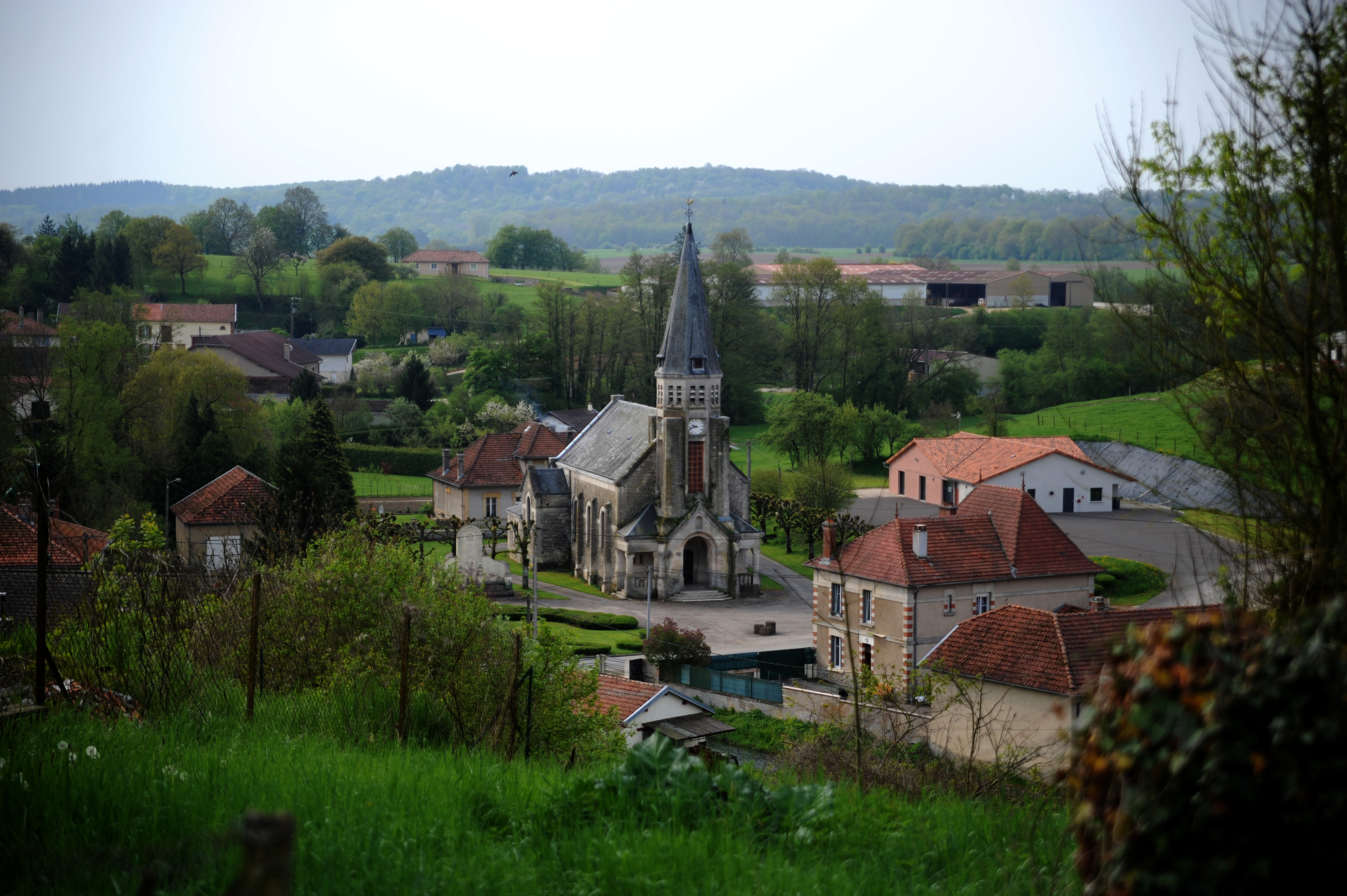

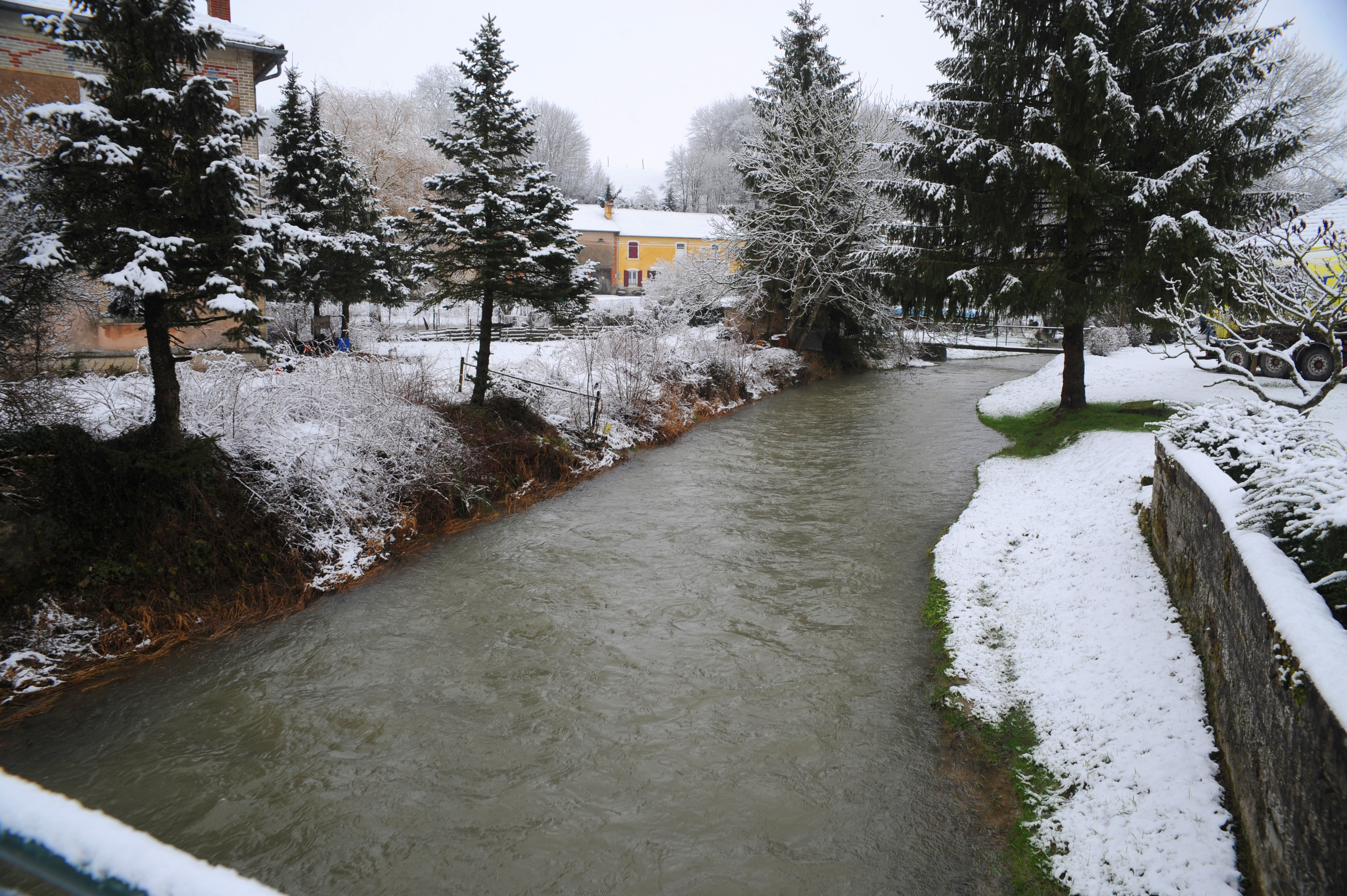

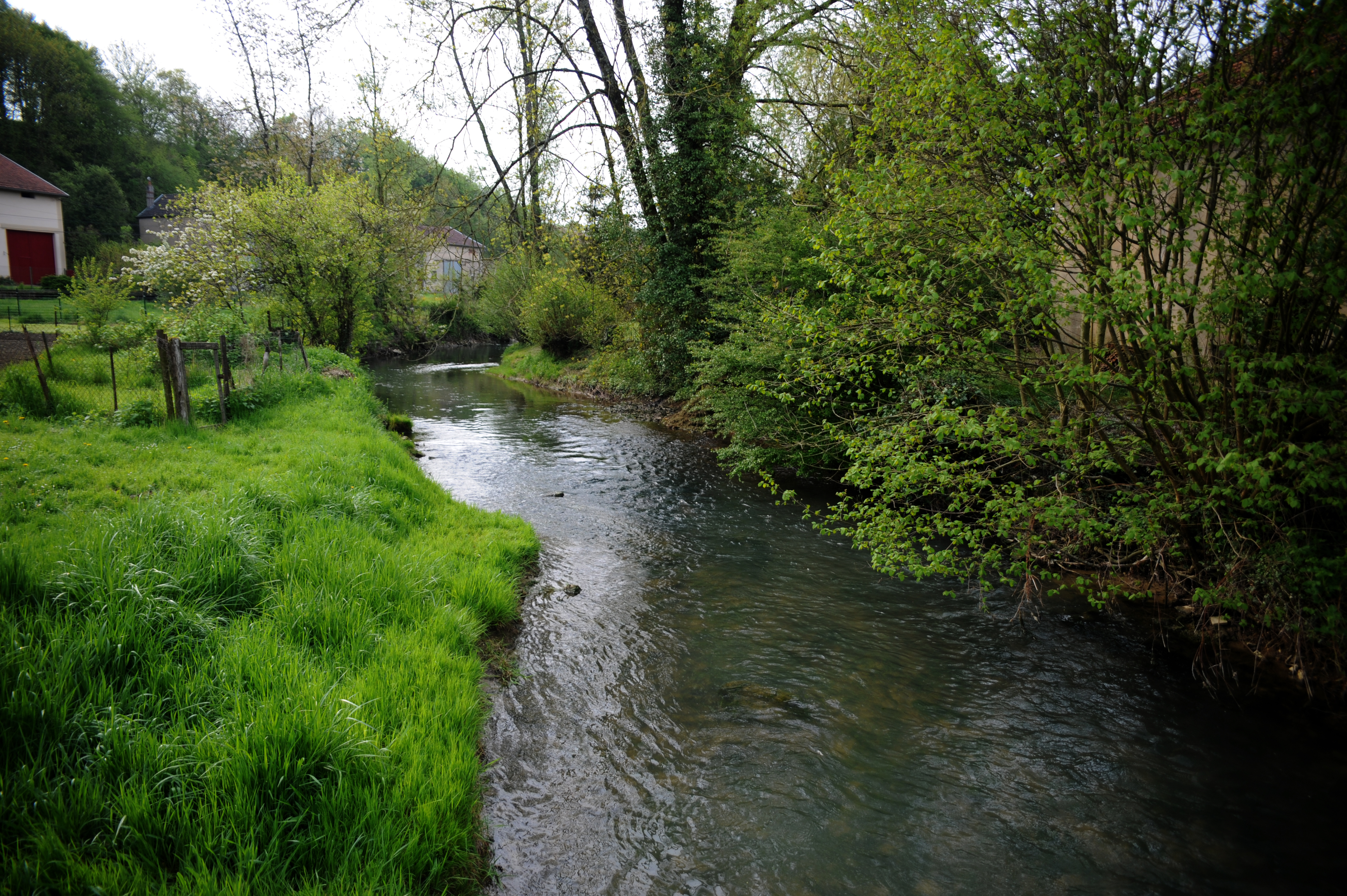

== See also ==
- Communes of the Meuse department

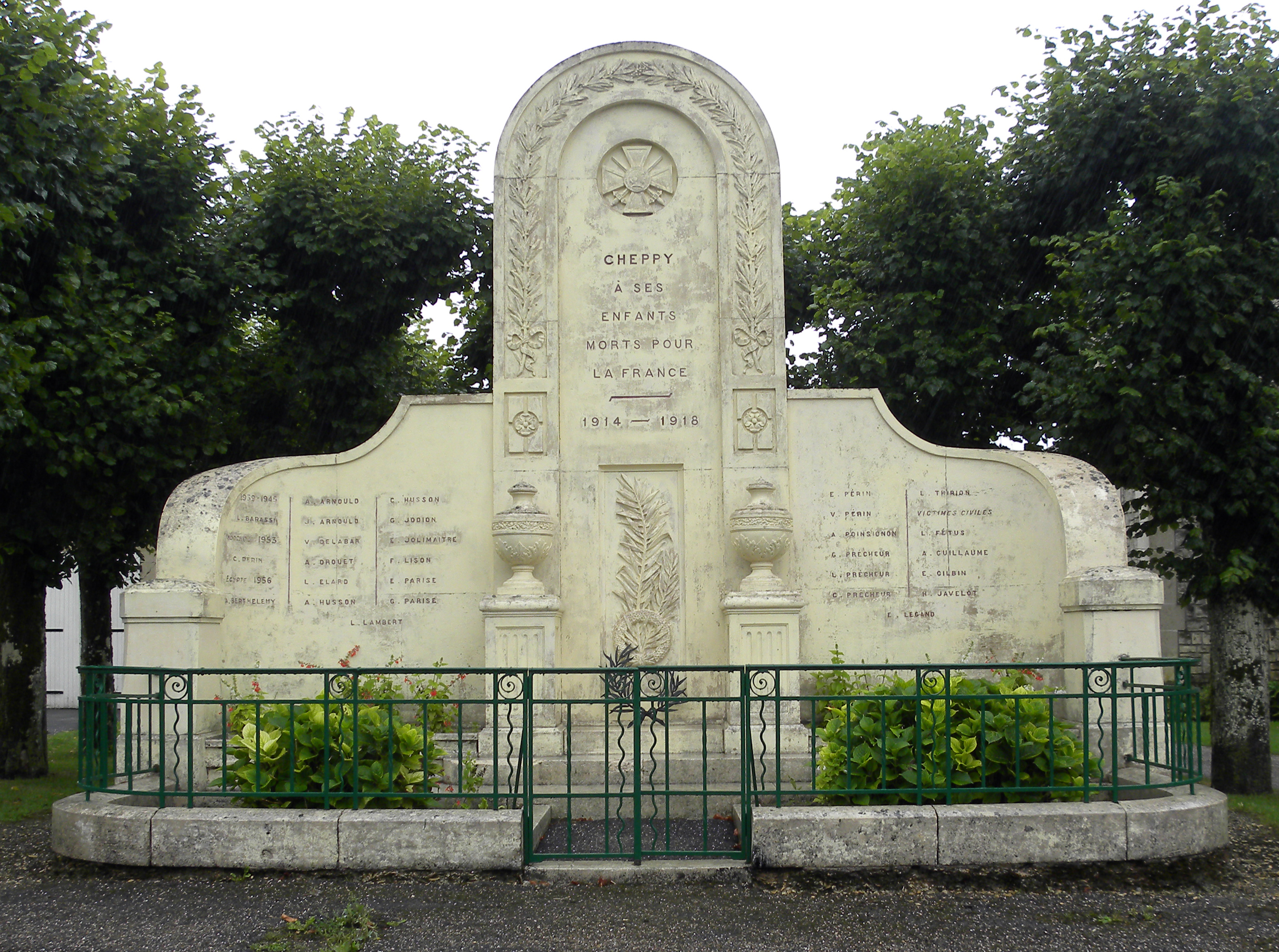
French World War I memorial in Cheppy, France.
