= General Donnelly =

General Donnelly may refer to:

- Arthur Barrett Donnelly (1875–1919), U.S. Army brigadier general
- Charles L. Donnelly Jr. (1929–1994), U.S. Air Force four-star general
- Edward Terence Donnelly (1871–1929), U.S. Army brigadier general
