= 287th Brigade =

287th Brigade may refer to:

- 287th Brigade, Royal Field Artillery, United Kingdom
- 287th Sustainment Brigade, United States
