= 635th Regiment =

635th Regiment may refer to:

- 635th Armored Regiment, United States
- 635th (King's Regiment) Infantry Regiment, Royal Artillery
- 635th (Royal Welch) Light Anti-Aircraft Regiment, Royal Artillery
