= 137th Infantry Regiment (United States) =

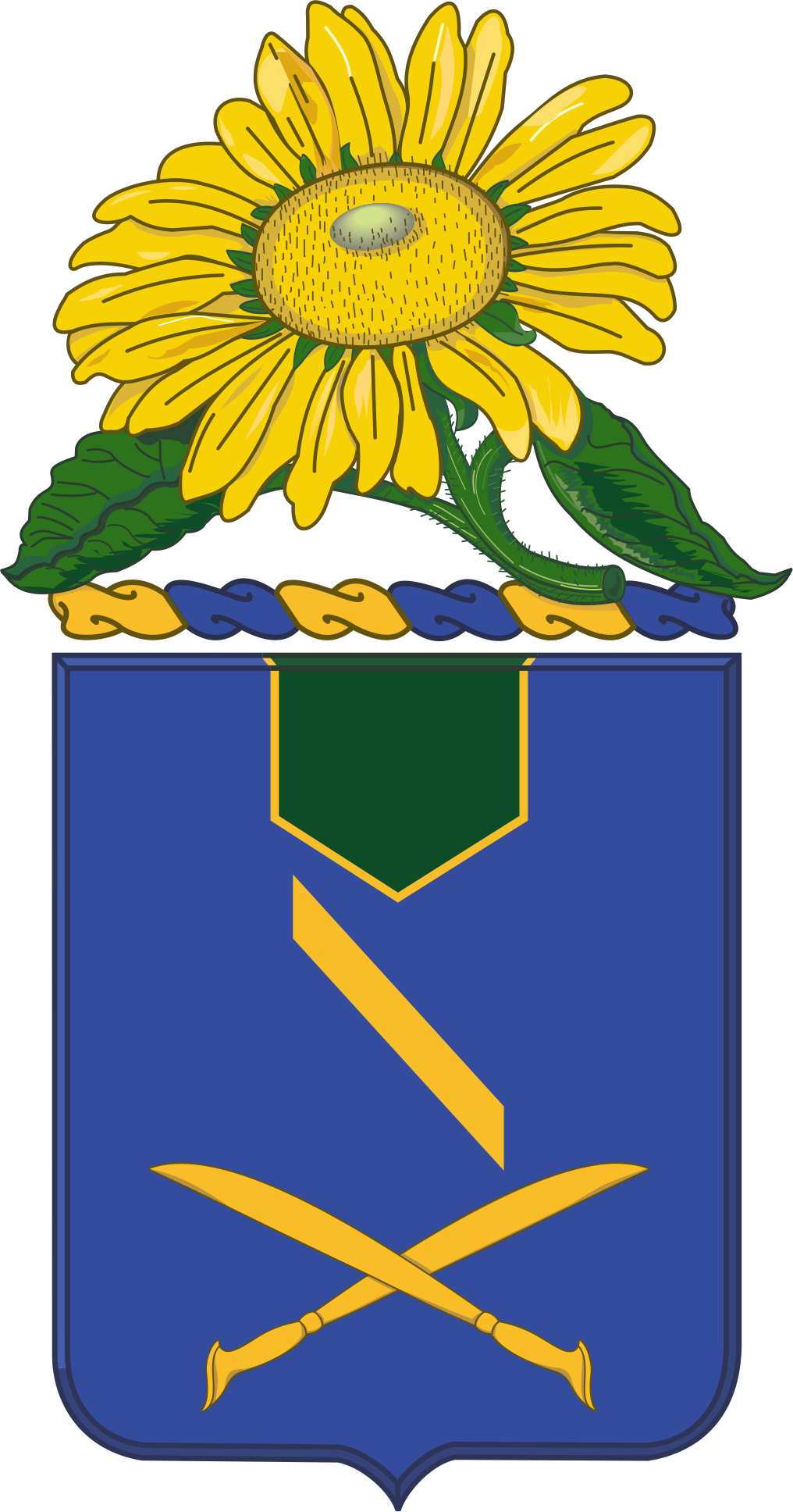
- 137th Infantry Rgt coat of arms
- Active: 1879–1919, 1921–1945, 1947–2020
- Country: United States
- Allegiance: Kansas
- Branch: Kansas Army National Guard
- Type: Infantry
- Mottos: Valor for Service (Volunteers, By God)
- Engagements: Philippine Insurrection: Battle of Manila; Capture of Malolos; World War I: Meuse-Argonne Offensive; World War II: Invasion of Normandy; Operation Cobra; Rhineland; Battle of the Bulge; Central Europe; Operation Iraqi Freedom

Commanders
- Commander: LTC Darren Koberlein
- Command Sergeant Major: Paul Purdham
- Notable commanders: Colonel Robert Sears

The 137th Infantry Regiment (First Kansas) was an infantry regiment of the United States Army. It was part of the Kansas Army National Guard and has served with distinction in the Philippine Insurrection, World War I, and World War II. The last active battalion was the 2nd Battalion, as the 2–137th Combined Arms Battalion, a component of the 635th Regional Support Group. The battalion was redesignated as the 1st Battalion, 635th Armor Regiment in 2020, although the structure of the unit remained unchanged.

== History ==
The regiment traced its history back to the organization of the 1st Infantry Regiment of the Kansas Volunteer Militia from pre-existing companies on 17 May 1879. On 7 March 1885, the Kansas Volunteer Militia became the Kansas National Guard.

=== Philippine–American War ===
John W. Leedy, the governor of Kansas, issued a call for volunteers to fight in the Spanish–American War on 26 April 1898, as soon as war was declared. The regiment was reorganized and officially mustered into service between 9 May and 13 May at Topeka, Kansas, as the 20th Kansas Volunteer Infantry. At the time of mustering in, the regiment consisted of 46 officers and 964 enlisted men. On 16 May, the regiment left for Camp Merritt, California, and due to disease, the regiment was forced to relocate to Camp Merriam, just north of the Presidio of San Francisco on 5 August. The regiment was still there when an armistice was signed on 12 August.

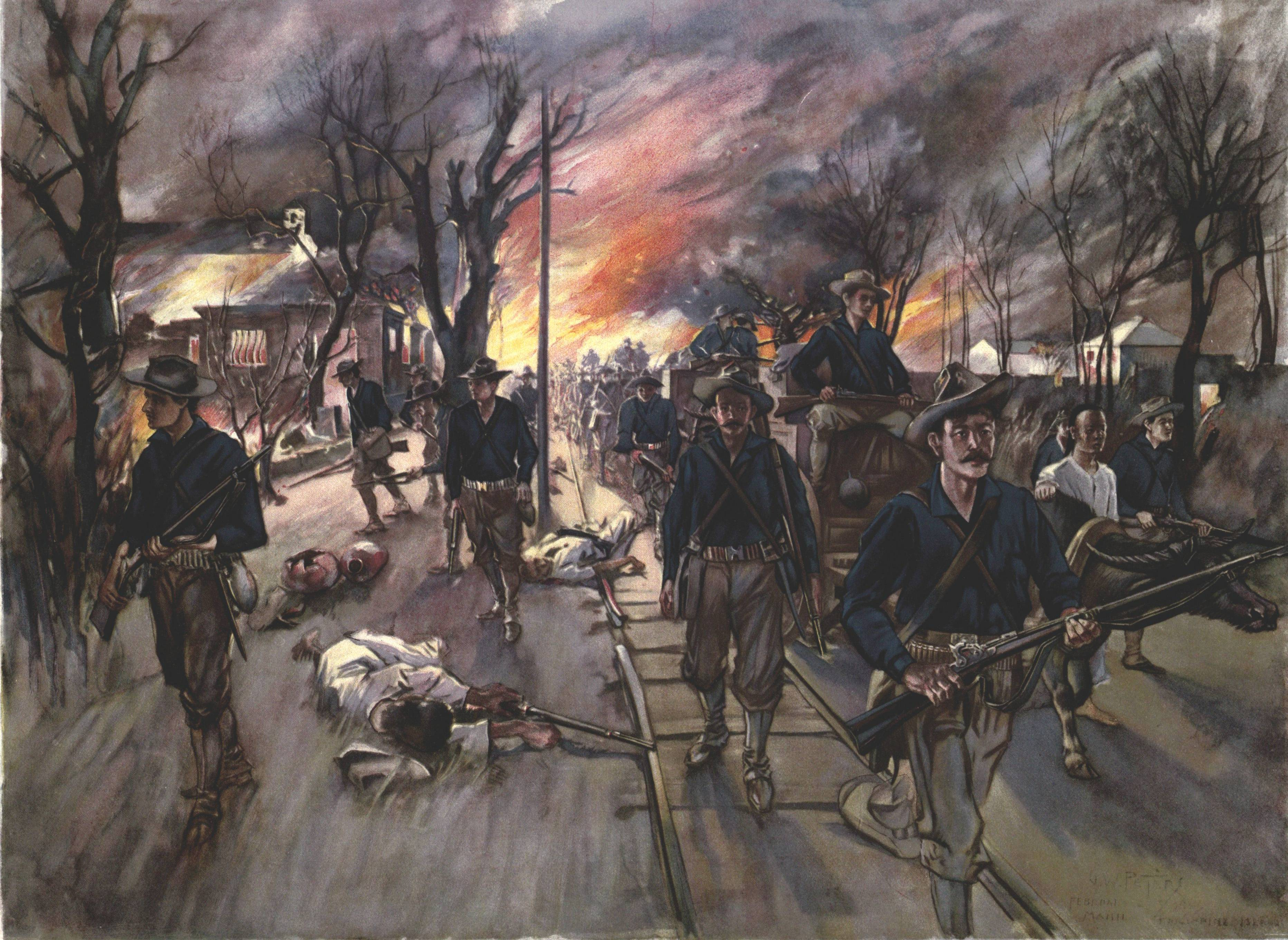
20th Kansas Volunteers marching through Caloocan at night, 1899

The 20th Kansas was slated to take part in the Fifth Philippine Expedition on 27 October 1898, and 2nd and 3rd Battalions arrived in Manila on 5 December, and the 1st Battalion arrived on 6 December. The Spanish–American War officially ended on 10 December, with the signing of the Treaty of Paris. The 20th Kansas had not seen combat against the Spaniards and were camped in tobacco warehouses in Manila until February 1899 when the Philippine Insurrection began. They advanced on, and were the first to enter, Caloocan on 10 February. On 25 March, the regiment swam the Tullahan River, captured a Blockhouse, and then was involved in the engagements of Malinta and Meycauayan three days later. On 28 March, some of the Kansans swam another river, capturing eighty prisoners among the men occupying the earthworks on the opposite side. On 31 March, the regiment entered Malolos, the capital of the First Philippine Republic. On 24 April, the 20th Kansas was involved in the advance against Calumpit, and in the next month, against San Thomas.

On 6 September 1899, the 20th Kansas Volunteer Infantry boarded transports and steamed for the US, arriving on 10 October. On 28 October, the regiment was mustered out of service. At the time of mustering out, the regiment had decreased in size, including 46 officers and 720 enlisted men. During its wartime service, the regiment had 3 officers and 19 enlisted men killed in action. An additional 11 enlisted men died of wounds received in battle. 35 enlisted men died from disease, and 145 more were discharged on disability. 4 enlisted men were court-martialed, and 4 men deserted.

=== World War I ===
Simultaneously with its mustering out from Federal service, the 20th Kansas was consolidated with the 1st Regiment of Infantry (Provisional), as the 1st Infantry Regiment of the Kansas National Guard. The regiment served the state government until mustered into Federal Service at Fort Riley for duty on the Mexico–United States border, under the orders of President Woodrow Wilson, on 27 June 1916. It reached Eagle Pass, Texas on 7 July. The regiment returned to Fort Riley and was mustered out on 30 October.

When the US declared war on Germany on 5 April 1917, companies were increased in size from 60 to 150 men, then eventually, to 250 men. On 5 August, the 137th Infantry Regiment was drafted into Federal service. On 1 October it was consolidated with the 2nd Infantry Regiment of the Kansas National Guard to become the 137th Infantry, part of the 35th Division. They subsequently set sail for Europe, entering the frontline on 18 June 1918. The 137th was stationed in the Metz area and successfully repulsed a German raid on the night of 22–23 June. On 20 July, Company C put on a successful raid of its own against the enemy.

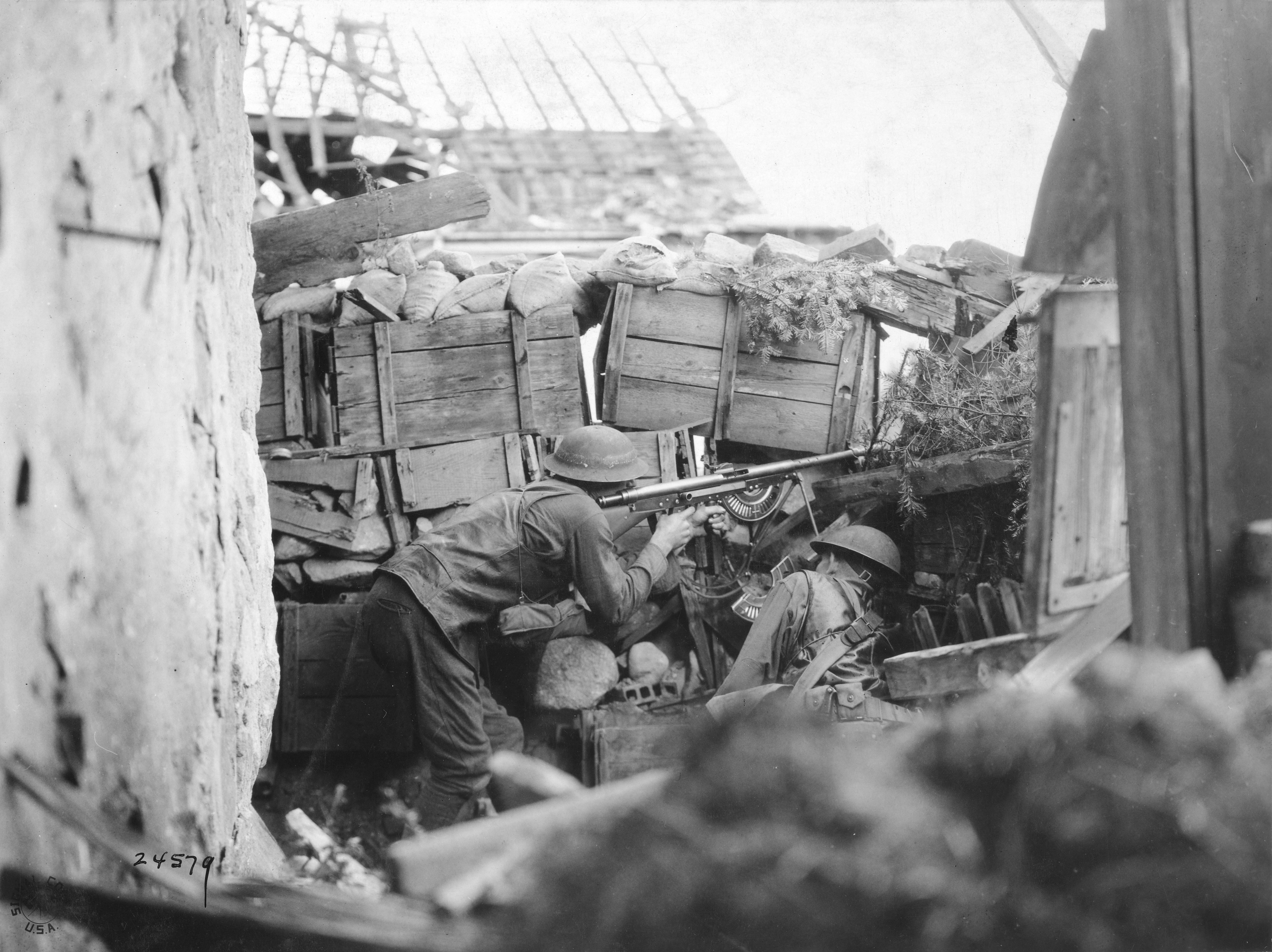
Automatic rifle team manning an 8 mm Chauchat 1915 model in Alsace, 29 August 1918

1 September saw the regiment moved by truck from the Vosges Mountains to Nancy and then into reserve for the Saint-Mihiel attack of 12–16 September. This surprise attack was so successful that the 35th Division was not used, and it was soon headed for the greatest American battle of the war. 25 September found the 137th Infantry in position facing Vauquois Hill, an impregnable natural fortress the Germans had held over four years. In the Meuse-Argonne Offensive, a 6-hour barrage was launched on this hill and was taken by the Kansas soldiers in their first attempt on 26 September, and their trial by fire began; an ordeal that was to last six days and six nights, with little or no food, only snatches of sleep, and an uninterrupted rain of shells, poison gas, and bullets from infantry, artillery and warplanes. The 137th Infantry took every objective assigned it, but in the taking suffered casualties of nearly 1,300 men out of the 2,800 combatants engaged; 46%. The regiment was relieved by the 1st Infantry Division on 1 October 1918, and after resting in the rear for 10 days, the regiment moved to Verdun and remained in the fighting until 4 November. They were in the thick of fighting until 9 November when they were relieved. The Armistice of 11 November 1918 finally stopped the fighting, after which the regiment returned to Kansas, where it demobilized at Camp Funston between 9 and 11 May 1919.

=== Interwar period ===
The former 1st Infantry Regiment of the Kansas National Guard was consolidated with the 4th Infantry Regiment, organized in 1918, to become the 137th Infantry of the 35th Division on 4 November 1921. The regiment was headquartered at Horton. Company D, formed in 1922, was composed entirely of American Indian students at Haskell Indian College in Topeka.

Between 14 December 1921 and 26 February 1922, the 1st and 3rd Battalions were called up for riot control during a coal miners' strike at Pittsburg. During the interwar period, the regiment conducted annual summer training mostly at Fort Riley. Both the 1st and 3rd Battalions provided relief between 13 and 16 July 1924 after a tornado struck Augusta. After the escape of criminals from the Kansas State Penitentiary, the 2nd Battalion was called up to perform road patrols and block bridges between 19–20 January 1934. Between 8–27 June of that year, it also provided riot control during labor troubles at copper mines in Baxter Springs. From 17 June-6 August 1935, the regimental headquarters and 3rd Battalion were called up to provide riot control during a coal miners' strike at Columbus.

=== World War II ===
The 137th Infantry was inducted into Federal service on 23 December 1940 in preparation for the possibility that the United States might enter World War II. The regiment was assigned to the 35th Infantry Division, just as it had been during World War I, and was sent to Camp Joseph T. Robinson, near Little Rock, Arkansas. Troops were recruited from all over Kansas. Company A drew men from Atchinson, Company B came from Emporia, Company C enlisted men from Council Grove, Company D hailed from Dodge City. Companies E, F, G, and H were recruited from Holton, Newton, Kansas City, and Lawrence respectively. Companies I and K hailed from Wichita, Company L came from Kingman, and Company M was also from Lawrence. Additional recruits came from Topeka and Cottonwood Falls.

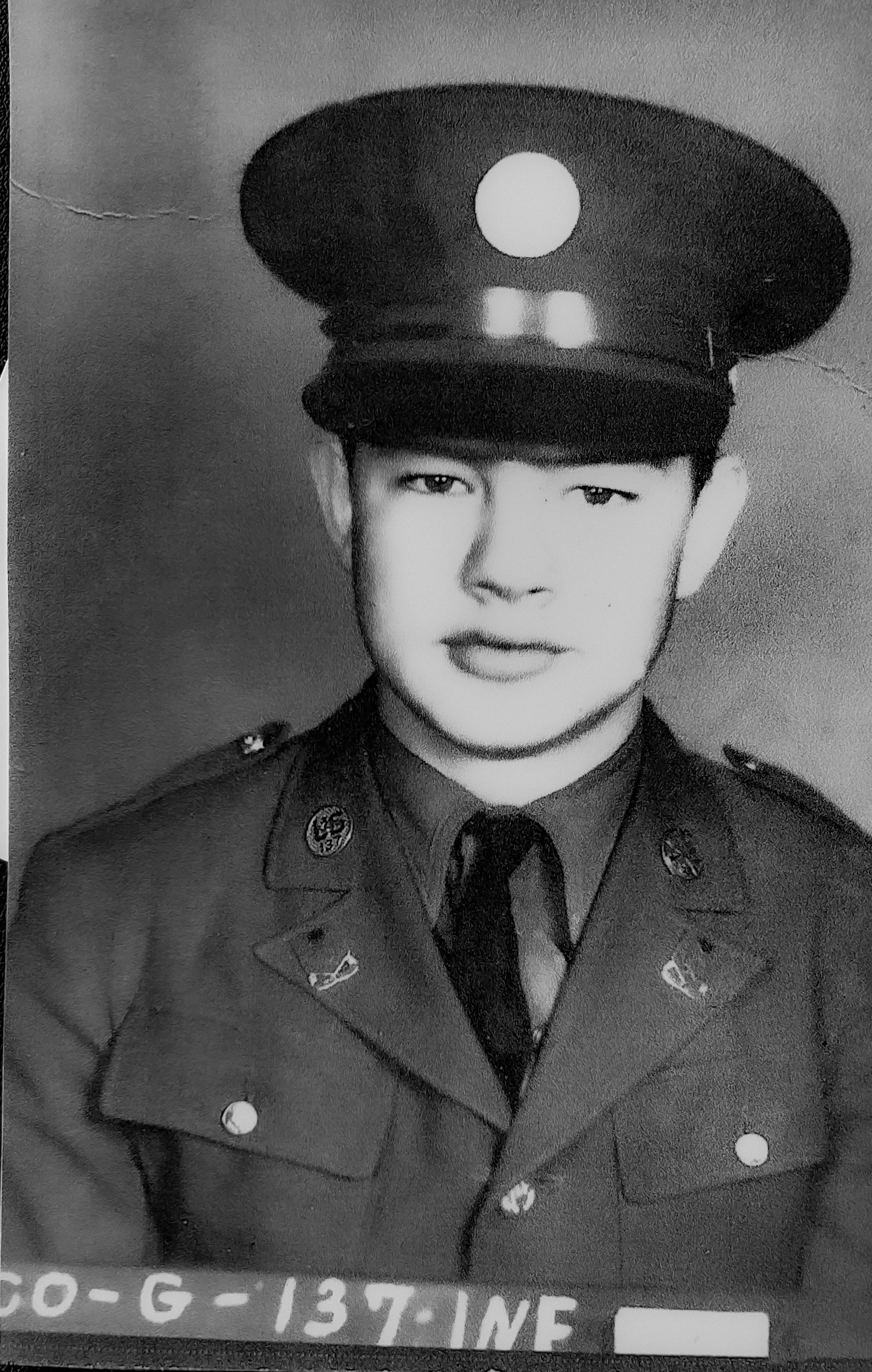
Photo of William C. Beggs of Kansas City, KS recruited into Company G, 137th Infantry Division, WWII

After the Attack on Pearl Harbor, the 137th was sent to Fort Ord, California to guard against the possibility of Japanese attacks on the West Coast. The regiment then went to Camp Rucker, Alabama on 31 March 1943, and then to Camp Forrest, Tennessee on 17 November 1943, where they conducted combat training for fighting in Europe. The regiment soon arrived in England on 25 May 1944, and then into the frontline in Normandy on 8 July 1944.

Here in Normandy, the 137th took part in the Battle of Saint-Lô where savage fighting among ruined urban streets and dense hedgerows caused numerous casualties. On 9 July, the 137th relieved the 119th Infantry Regiment of the 30th Infantry Division. The 1st attack the 137th made was on the morning of 11 July 1944, and they made small gains at the cost of 12 killed, 96 wounded, and 18 missing. 12 July saw another attack toward the town of St. Gilles with the 2nd (2–137) and 3rd (3–137) Battalions in the lead. The regiment captured 47 prisoners on 13 July, most of which were Poles, Czechs, and Austrians who seemed glad to be out of the fighting. The entire regiment continued to attack almost every day against the strong German positions, suffering many casualties, but driving the enemy back slowly by surely. On 25 July, the regiment witnessed the beginning of Operation Cobra, and Allied bombers bombed German positions right near friendly lines. The 137th suffered 2 men killed and 3 wounded due to this friendly fire incident. The 137th continued to advance through the heavy fighting, alongside the 134th Infantry Regiment, and pushed the enemy back, south and east from Saint-Lô. On 6 August, the regiment had a break from the fighting. They stayed put and awaited orders to move. Since arriving in France, the 137th Infantry had suffered 1,183 casualties, consisting of 177 killed, 946 wounded, and 40 missing in action. Many of the wounded had returned to duty, and these and new replacements totaled 826.

In the afternoon of 6 August 1944, the regiment was on the move again, to the Saint-Hilaire-du-Harcouët area. They continued moving until they reached the vicinity of Mortain, where the men began patrolling in conjunction with soldiers from the 30th Infantry Division. The Germans launched Operation Lüttich, a counterattack against Mortain, to contain the Allied breakout from Normandy, and they met heavy opposition from the American forces. The 137th fought here from 7–13 August, and they suffered 23 killed, 140 wounded, and 40 missing in action. The German counterattack was beaten back. The regiment continued on through the Allied breakout and pushed east to the city of Orléans and then onto Nancy which they captured after heavy resistance. After beating back a fierce German counterattack in the Gremercey Forest, the regiment moved north to Metz. After minor patrolling in Alsace-Lorraine, they moved north to fight in the Battle of the Bulge on 26 December 1944. Heavy fighting in Luxembourg and Belgium saw the 137th suffer heavy casualties, but they beat back the enemy wherever they met them. Fighting along the Dutch border of Germany saw the regiment cross the Rhine in March 1945. They advanced east through Germany encountering heavy resistance along the Autobahn superhighway, and they captured hundreds of German prisoners in the Ruhr region by the time the war ended. They assumed occupation duties in Germany until returning to the US, and were inactivated on 5 December 1945 at Camp Breckinridge.

=== Cold War ===
On 17 July 1947, the 137th was reorganized and Federally recognized, headquartered at Wichita. In 1954, the 137th Infantry Regiment was part of the 35th Infantry Division. On 1 May 1959, it was reorganized as a parent regiment under the Combat Arms Regimental System, including the 1st and 2d Battle Groups, part of the 35th Division. On 1 April 1963, the battle groups were redesignated as battalions. On 15 December 1967 a 3rd Battalion was activated.

The 1st and 2nd Battalions were again called to active service on 13 May 1968 during the Vietnam War as part of the 69th Infantry Brigade (SEP) and sent to Fort Carson, Colorado. The regiment and brigade became a part of the 5th Infantry Division (Mechanized). It remained at Fort Carson until 12 December 1969 when it was released from active duty, and returned to the Kansas Army National Guard. Many of the enlisted soldiers and most of the Regiment's Officers were sent to Vietnam as replacements to regular army units.

On 1 February 1976, the 3rd Battalion was inactivated, and the 1st and 2nd Battalions were assigned to the 69th Brigade. On 25 August 1984 the two battalions were reassigned to the 35th Division when it was reformed from the 69th Brigade headquarters. On 1 May 1989, the regiment was withdrawn from the Combat Arms Regimental System and reorganized under the United States Army Regimental System. On 1 September 1992, the 1st Battalion was inactivated, leaving the 2nd Battalion as the only active unit of the regiment.

=== War on terror ===
On 1 September 2008, the inactive 1st Battalion, 137th Infantry was consolidated with the active 635th Armored Regiment, and the consolidated unit was redesignated as the 1st Battalion, 635th Armored Regiment.

In the spring of 2004, the 2nd Battalion, 137th Infantry received their Bradley Fighting Vehicles and began training to assume an active role in Afghanistan or Iraq. The Battalion was called to active duty in early August 2005. The Battalion was sent to Fort Sill, Oklahoma, and then to the National Training Center, Fort Irwin, California for pre-deployment training. They served for one year during the War in Iraq (Operation Iraqi Freedom) from October 2005 to October 2006, with the XVIII Airborne Corps, the 3rd and the 4th Infantry Divisions. One of the battalion's soldiers was killed in action. The 2–137th returned to Kansas in November 2006. In March 2010, the Battalion was activated for service in the Global War on Terror and conducted predeployment training at Kansas Regional Training Center, Salina, Kansas and Joint Base Lewis-McChord, Washington. The unit arrived in Djibouti, Africa in May 2010 under United States Africa Command tasked with providing force protection to Camp Lemonnier and Combined Joint Task Force-Africa. The Battalion also supported DOD and State Department missions building capacities among partner nations across east Africa. The unit redeployed through Camp McCoy, Wisconsin in April 2011 having earned the Meritorious Unit Commendation.

=== Present structure ===
The last active unit of the regiment was the 2nd Combined Arms Battalion, 137th Infantry. Their mission was to close with and destroy the enemy by means of fire and maneuver or repel assaults by fire, close combat and counterattack. The units operated the M2 Bradley Fighting Vehicle and the Army's main battle tank, the M1A2 SEP V2 Abrams.

2nd Combined Arms Battalion, 137th Infantry Regiment
– Headquarters and Headquarters Company: Kansas City, Kansas.
– Headquarters Company Detachment: Junction City, Kansas.
– Company A (armor): Emporia.
– Company B (armor): Lenexa.
– Company G (mechanized infantry): Wichita.
– Company G, 106th Brigade Support Battalion: Manhattan.

In a 17 October 2020 ceremony, the 2nd Battalion, 137th Infantry was redesignated as the 1st Battalion, 635th Armor Regiment, although its structure as a combined arms battalion remained the same.
