= 635th Regional Support Group =

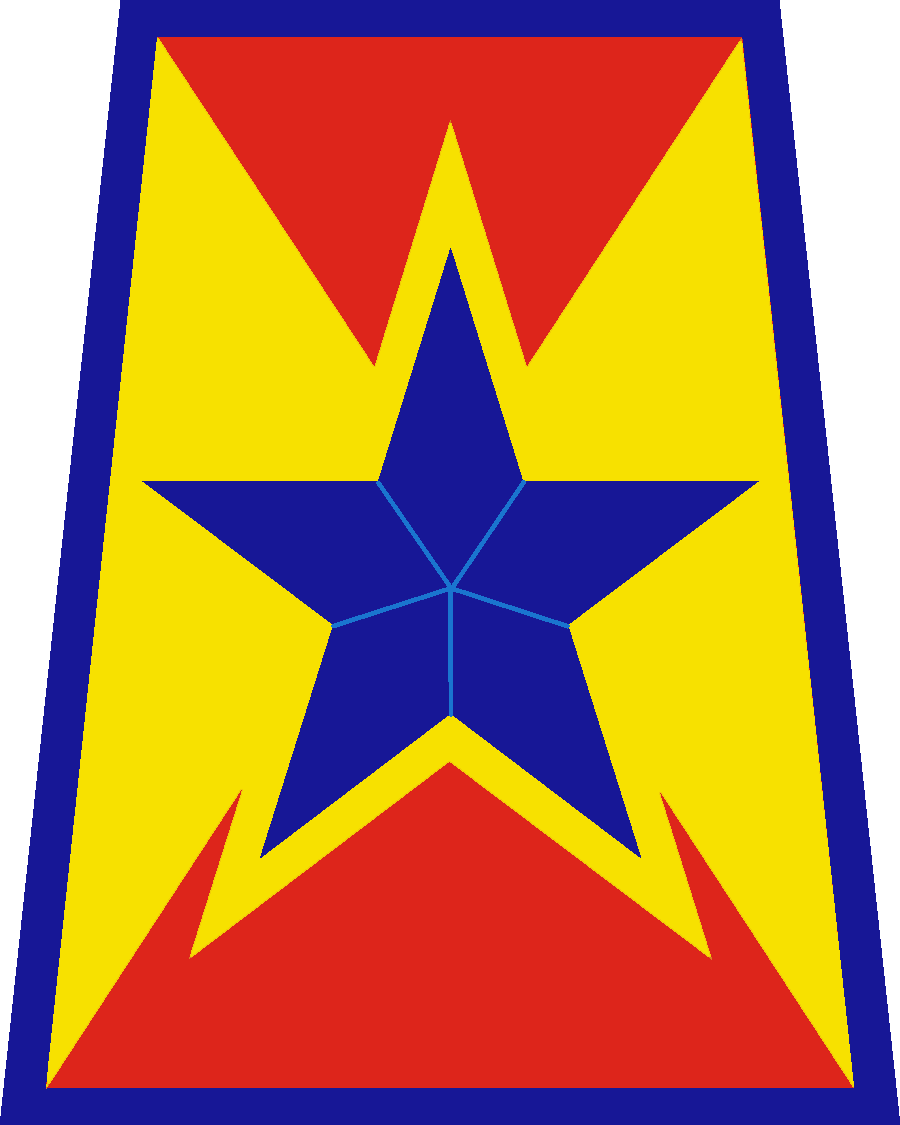
- Active: 1917-present
- Country: United States
- Branch: United States Army National Guard
- Role: Support
- Size: Group (Brigade)
- Part of: Kansas Army National Guard
- Garrison/HQ: Topeka, Kansas
- Website: https://www.kansastag.gov/236/635th-Regional-Support-Group

Commanders
- Current commander: COL Zachary Rolf
- Command Sergeant Major: CSM Melissa Stupka

Insignia
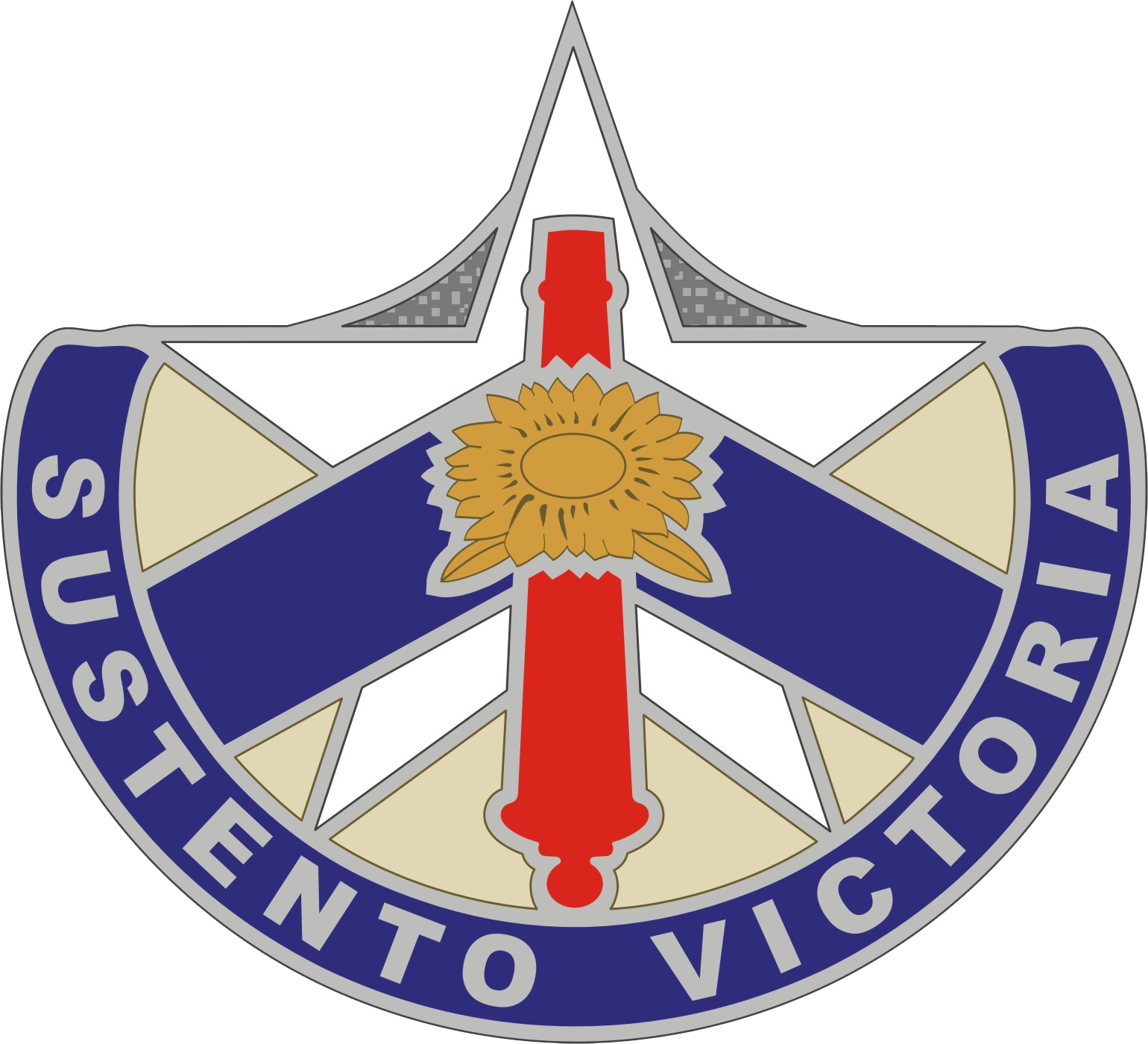
- 635th Regional Support Group DUI

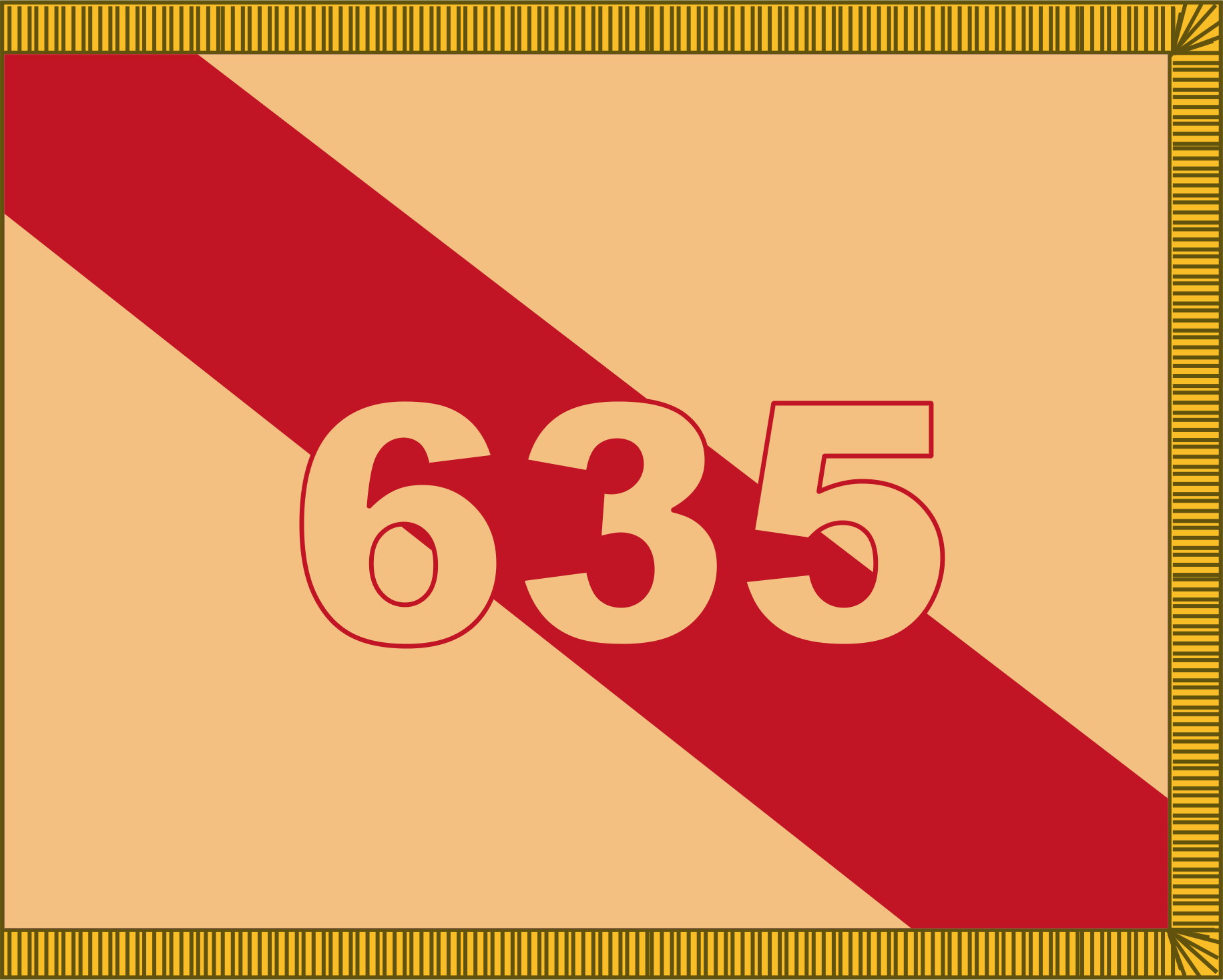
- 635th Regional Support Group Flag

The 635th Regional Support Group is a unit of the Kansas Army National Guard. The unit has a long lineage starting in 1917 when it was formed as the 1st Field Artillery Kansas ARNG. It was federalized as the 130th Field Artillery, 35th Infantry Division for World War I where it earned campaign streamers for Meuse-Argonne, Alsace 1918 and Lorraine 1918. After the war it was returned to the national guard in its original designation. It was again redesignated 130th Field Artillery and federalized in 1921.

In 1940, the regiments were split up for federal service and the unit ceased to exist until 1945. In 1946 it became the HHB, 130th Field Artillery Group at Hutchinson, Kansas. In 1978 became the 130th Field Artillery Brigade. It was reorganized in 1985 as the HHB, 35th Infantry Division Artillery (DIVARTY).

In 2006, it was redesignated HHC 635th Support Group in Topeka, Kansas. It served 2017-2018 in Overseas Contingency Operations where it earned at least one campaign streamer.

The group's mission is force management, staging, movement, and force integration for homeland defense and civil support missions in support of state and federal agencies.

== Organization ==
- 635th Regional Support Group, in Topeka
  - Headquarters and Headquarters Company, 635th Regional Support Group, in Topeka
  - 1st Battalion, 635th Armor Regiment, in Kansas City (part of 155th Armored Brigade Combat Team)
    - Headquarters and Headquarters Company, 1st Battalion, 635th Armor Regiment, in Kansas City
      - Detachment 1, Headquarters and Headquarters Company, 1st Battalion, 635th Armor Regiment, in Junction City
      - Detachment 1, Headquarters and Headquarters Battery, 2nd Battalion, 114th Field Artillery Regiment, in Junction City
    - Company A (Tank), 1st Battalion, 635th Armor Regiment, in Emporia
    - Company B (Tank), 1st Battalion, 635th Armor Regiment, in Lawrence
    - Company C (Mechanized Infantry), 1st Battalion, 635th Armor Regiment, in Wichita
      - Detachment 1, Company C (Mechanized Infantry), 1st Battalion, 635th Armor Regiment, in Lawrence
    - Company G (Forward Support), 106th Brigade Support Battalion, in Manhattan
      - Detachment 1, Company G (Forward Support), 106th Brigade Support Battalion, in Kansas City
  - 891st Engineer Battalion, in Iola
    - Headquarters and Headquarters Company, 891st Engineer Battalion, in Iola
    - Forward Support Company, 891st Engineer Battalion, in Iola
    - 35th Military Police (Combat Support), in Topeka
    - 226th Engineer Company (Vertical Construction Company), in Augusta
      - Detachment 1, 226th Engineer Company (Vertical Construction Company), in Salina
    - 242nd Engineer Company (Engineer Construction Company), in Coffeyville
      - Detachment 1, 242nd Engineer Company (Engineer Construction Company), in Wichita
      - Detachment 2, 242nd Engineer Company (Engineer Construction Company), in Pittsburg
