= 635th Armored Regiment =

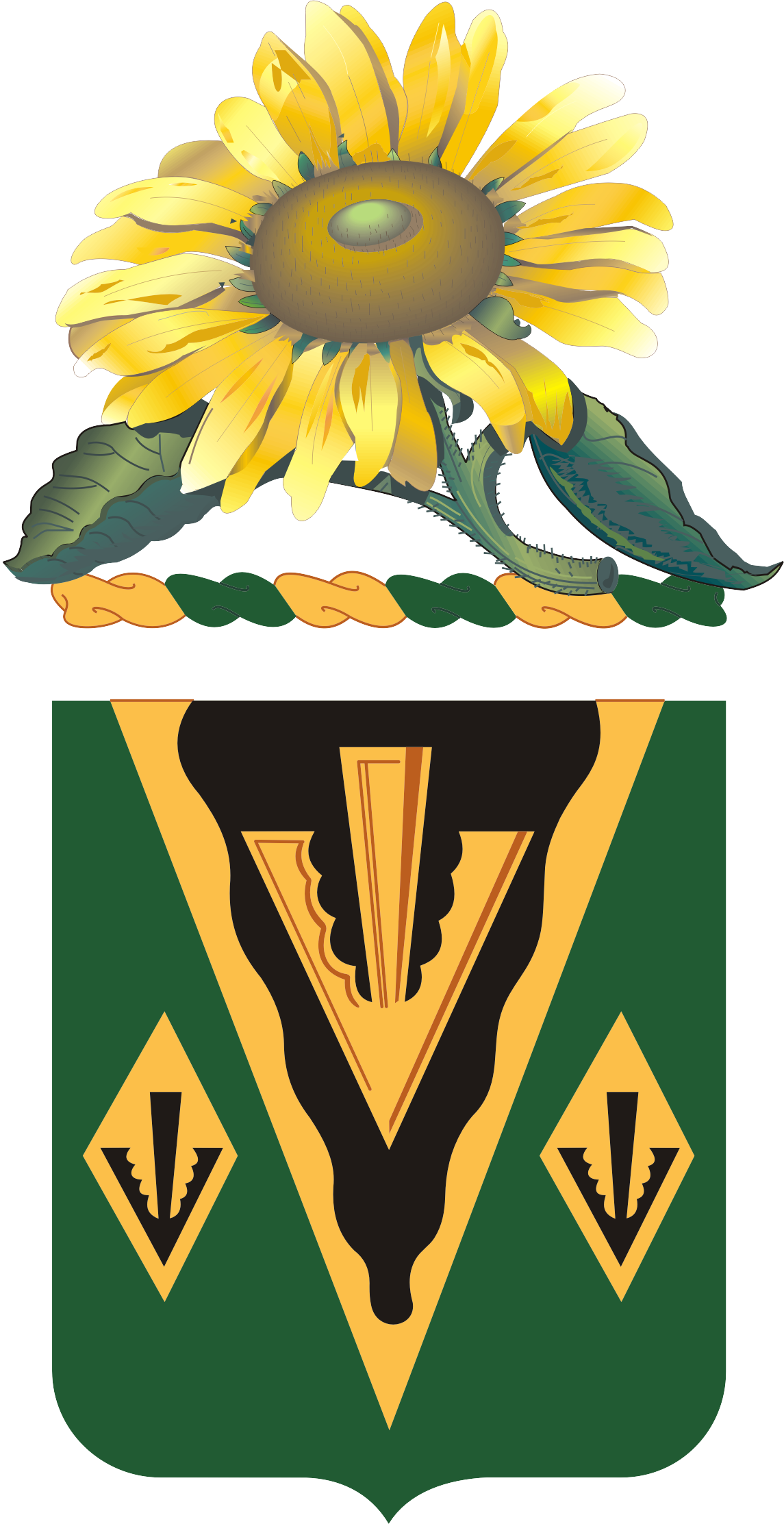
- 635th Armored Regiment Coat of Arms
- Active: 1953-1957; 1976-1990; 2020-
- Country: United States
- Allegiance: Kansas
- Branch: Kansas Army National Guard
- Type: Mechanized Infantry
- Motto: "Will to Win"
- Engagements: War on terror; Operation Joint Guardian; Operation Enduring Freedom; Operation Iraqi Freedom; Operation Spartan Shield; Operation Inherent Resolve

Commanders
- Commander: LTC Matthew Holler
- Command Sergeant Major: CSM Eric Kaltenborn

Insignia
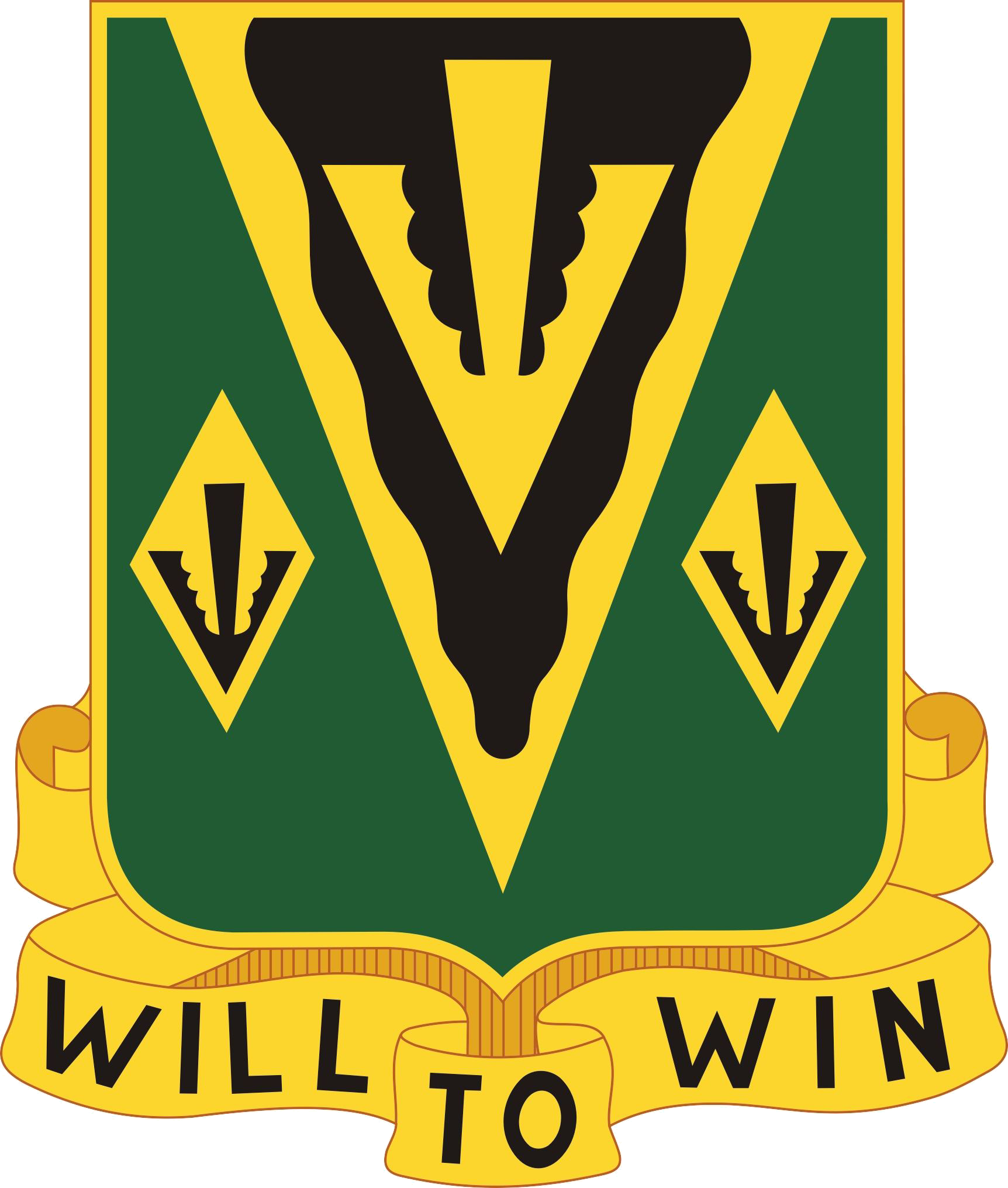
- Distinctive unit insignia

The 635th Armored Regiment is an armor regiment of the Kansas Army National Guard, organized under the U.S. Army Regimental System, with headquarters at Kansas City.

== History ==
=== 1st Battalion ===
The 1st Battalion, 635th Armored Regiment, is associated with the 155th Armored Brigade Combat Team. The 635th Armored Regiment takes its lineage from the 2nd Combined Arms Battalion, 137th Infantry Regiment ("First Kansas") which was redesignated on 17 October 2020. The 1st Combined Arms Battalion, 137th Infantry Regiment had formed what would become the first part of the 635th Armored Regiment in late 2008.

The battalion has two armored companies operating the M1A2 SEP v2 Abrams main battle tank and one mechanized infantry company operating the M2A3 Bradley infantry fighting vehicle. These companies are augmented with mortars, snipers, fires support, medical, and communications sections, and are sustained by an expeditionary forward support company.

The 1st Battalion, 635th Armor Regiment was originally constituted on 25 March 1953 in the Air National Guard as the 891st Engineer Aviation Battalion. On 1 August 1953, the battalion was allotted to the Kansas Army National Guard, and it was organized and federally recognized in January 1954, with personnel drawn from both new and existing units. Its initial headquarters was located in Manhattan, Kansas.

In 1957, the battalion was reorganized and redesignated as the 891st Engineer Battalion. On 1 February 1976, the unit was converted and redesignated as the 635th Armored Regiment, a parent regiment within the Combat Arms Regimental System (CARS), with the 1st Battalion as a constituent element.

The 635th Armor was withdrawn from the Combat Arms Regimental System on 1 June 1989 and reorganized under the U.S. Army Regimental System (USARS), with its headquarters remaining in Manhattan. In March 1990, the regiment was further reorganized to include the 1st and 2nd Battalions as elements of the 35th Infantry Division, with battalion headquarters in Manhattan and Salina, respectively.

In 2008 the 1st Battalion, 137th Infantry Regiment, which had been inactive since 1992, was consolidated into the 635th Armor, resulting in the combined unit being designated as the 1st Battalion, 635th Armor.

On 17 October 2020, the 2nd Combined Arms Battalion, 137th Infantry, the last active battalion of that regiment, was redesignated as the 1st Battalion, 635th Armor Regiment

=== War on Terrorism ===
2004 Yugoslavia Deployment

Approximately 350 soldiers of the 1st Battalion, 635th Armor, departed on the first leg of a deployment to Kosovo on Oct. 27, 2004 as part of Operation Enduring Freedom, NATO’s peacekeeping operation in the former Yugoslavia. The battalion, headquartered in Manhattan, had units in Emporia, Junction City, and Lenexa. It was equipped with the M1A1 Abrams tank, but they would not be making the trip. The battalion’s first stop was to be Fort Lewis, Washington, followed by their entry into Kosovo. Here their mission was to assist in stability and support operations. On Friday, Jan, 27, 2006 the over 300 soldiers of the 1st Battalion, 635th Armor, returned from their 15-month deployment to Kosovo. While there, they had provided force protection and fixed and roving security, as well as escort duty.

2019 Operation Spartan Shield/Inherent Resolve Deployment

The 1st Battalion, 635th Armor Regiment, along with the 170th Maintenance Company, deployed to the Central Command Area from the dates of February 2019 to November 2019 in support of Operation Spartan Shield & Inherent Resolve. While there, personnel were rotated around to the areas of Kuwait, Iraq, Syria, Jordan and UAE. The unit participated in the main training missions of Iron Union 2019 and Eager Lion 19.

While, at this time, the unit was officially named, 2nd Combined Arms Battalion, 137th Infantry Regiment, they still fell under the 635th Armored Regiment due to Reorganizations completion for after deployment and officially wore the 155th Armored Brigade Combat Team Patch.

2024 Operation Spartan Shield/Inherent Resolve Deployment

The 1st Battalion, 635th Armor Regiment, along with the 170th Maintenance Company, a combined of 700+ Soldiers deployed to the Central Command Area from the dates of February 2024 to November 2024 in support of Operation Spartan Shield & Inherent Resolve under the name of Task Force Reaper alongside the other states of California, Georgia, Kentucky and Mississippi. While there, personnel were rotated around to the areas of Kuwait, Syria, Jordan, Saudi Arabia and UAE. The unit participated in many training missions, such as Iron Union 2024, Eager Lion 24 and the construction of bases in Saudi Arabia. In November 2024, the unit awarded over 40+ Combat Infantryman and Combat Action Badges for combat actions due to IDF and Drone Strikes in Syria during their deployment.

== Organization ==
- 1st Battalion, 635th Armor Regiment, in Kansas City (part of 155th Armored Brigade Combat Team)
  - Headquarters and Headquarters Company, 1st Battalion, 635th Armor Regiment, in Kansas City
    - Detachment 1, Headquarters and Headquarters Company, 1st Battalion, 635th Armor Regiment, in Junction City
    - Detachment 1, Headquarters and Headquarters Battery, 2nd Battalion, 114th Field Artillery Regiment, in Junction City
  - Company A (Tank), 1st Battalion, 635th Armor Regiment, in Emporia
  - Company B (Tank), 1st Battalion, 635th Armor Regiment, in Lawrence
  - Company C (Mechanized Infantry), 1st Battalion, 635th Armor Regiment, in Wichita
    - Detachment 1, Company C (Mechanized Infantry), 1st Battalion, 635th Armor Regiment, in Lawrence
  - Company G (Forward Support), 106th Brigade Support Battalion, in Manhattan
    - Detachment 1, Company G (Forward Support), 106th Brigade Support Battalion, in Kansas City
