= Kansas Army National Guard =

Component of the U.S. Army and military of the state of Kansas

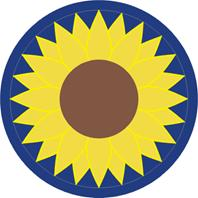
- Kansas Army National Guard Headquarters SSI
- Active: August 30, 1855–present
- Country: United States of America
- Allegiance: State of Kansas
- Type: ARNG Headquarters Command
- Size: more than 5,200 authorized
- Part of: Kansas National Guard; Army National Guard
- Garrison/HQ: City of Topeka and City of Salina

Commanders
- Commander: BG Carlin G. Williams
- Chief of Staff: COL Rodney Seaba

Insignia
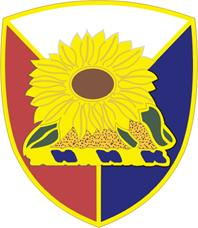
- Kansas ARNG Headquarters DUI

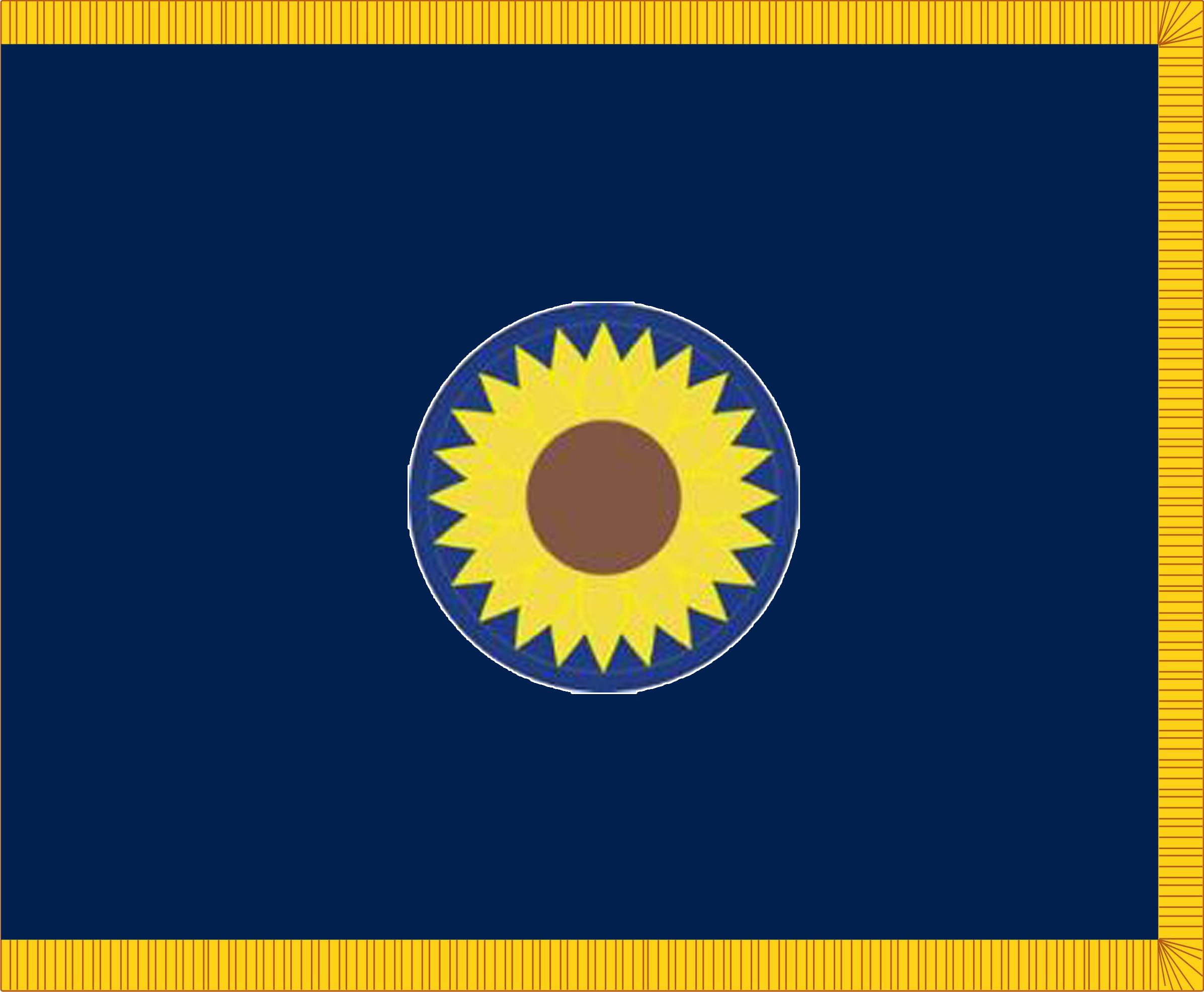
- Kansas ARNG Headquarters Flag

- Kansas ARNG Crest

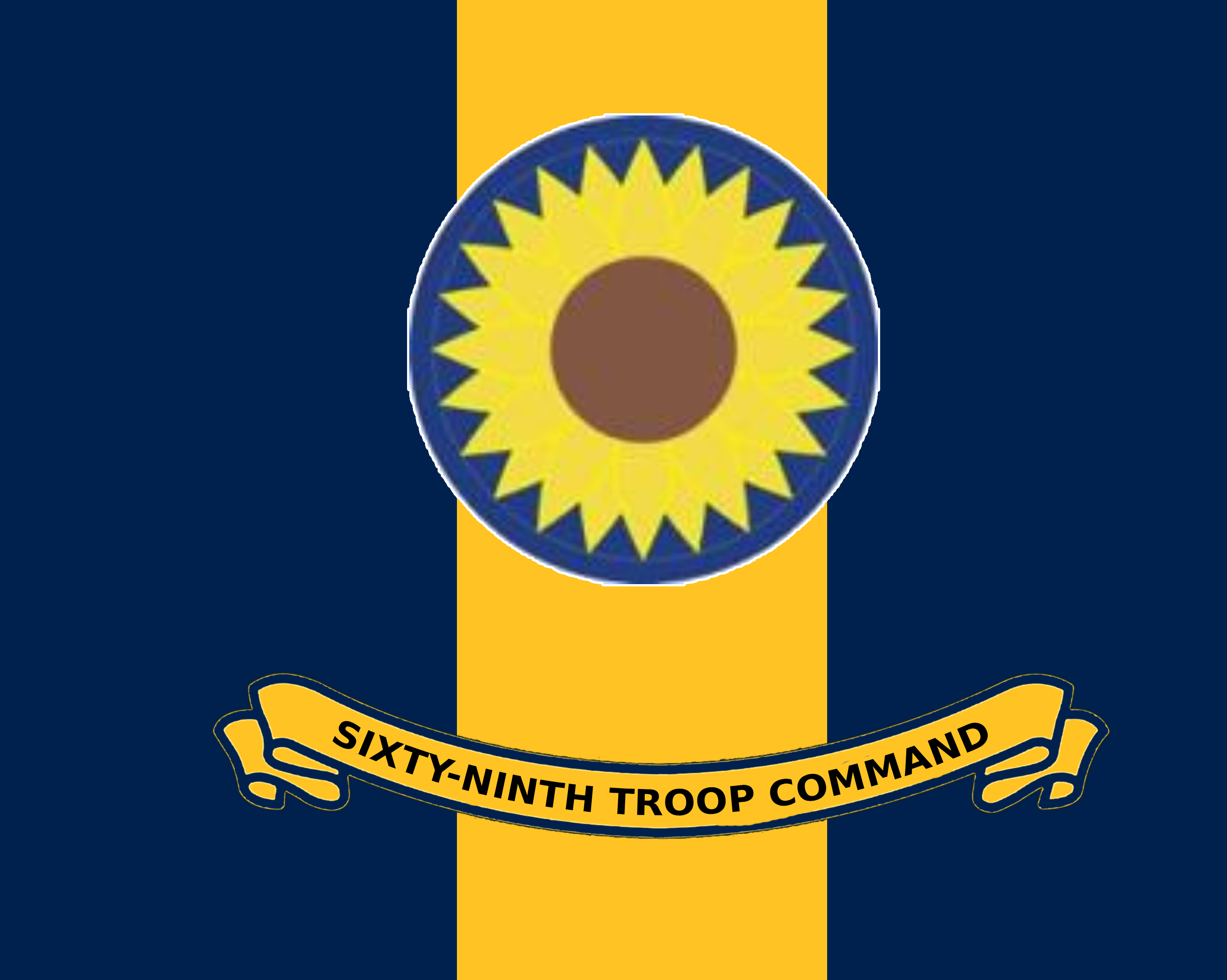
- Kansas ARNG 69th Troop Command Flag

The Kansas Army National Guard is a component of the Army National Guard and the Kansas National Guard. Kansas Army National Guard units are trained and equipped as part of the United States Army. The same ranks and insignia are used and National Guardsmen are eligible to receive all United States military awards. The Kansas Guard also bestows a number of state awards for local services rendered in or to the state of Kansas. It is, along with the Kansas Air National Guard, an element of the Kansas National Guard.

== History ==
The forerunner of the Kansas National Guard, the Kansas Territorial Militia, was formed on August 30, 1855. On January 29, 1861, six years after the formation of the territorial militia, Kansas became the 34th state and the Kansas Militia was organized. Article 8, Section 4 of the Kansas Constitution designates the governor of Kansas as the commander in chief for state duties. The U.S. Congress passed the Militia Act of 1903, which organized the various state militias into the present National Guard system.

The Kansas Army National Guard has been involved in the nation's conflicts since the state's inception as a territory. The Kansas Guard actively participated in the Civil War, 1861–1865; the Indian Wars, 1864–1870; Spanish–American War, 1898–1899; and the Pancho Villa Expedition of 1916; and the First World War, 1917–1919.

The 2nd Infantry Regiment of the Kansas Volunteer Militia was organized from existing units in 1880. The regiment was mustered into federal service in June 1916 for duty guarding the Mexican Border against invasion. The regiment served for five months at Eagle Pass, Texas. In August 1917, the 2nd Infantry Regiment was drafted into federal service. The Kansas National Guard supplied troops to the 35th Infantry Division when it was organized in August 1917 as a formation with troops from Kansas and Missouri. The 2nd Infantry Regiment was consolidated with the 1st Infantry Regiment and re-designated the 137th Infantry Regiment, Kansas National Guard and assigned to the 35th Division. The regiment saw duty in France and participated in the Meuse-Argonne offensive. The 137th Infantry Regiment were demobilized in May 1919, after 34 months of active duty service. In November 1921, the 2nd Infantry Regiment was re-designated as the 161st Field Artillery Regiment and assigned to the 35th Division.

In 1918, Kansas Army National Guard Lieutenant Erwin R. Bleckley, who volunteered for aviation duty, was posthumously awarded the Medal of Honor for his actions during an aerial sortie during World War I. He was the first National Guard aviator to earn the award and one of only three to earn it during the 20th century.

Units of the Kansas Army National Guard fought in World War II and the Korean War from 1950 to 1952, when the 130th Field Artillery Group headquarters, the 195th Field Artillery Battalion, and the 174th Military Police Battalion were mobilized.

In 1963, the 69th Infantry Brigade was activated as part of the Kansas Army National Guard. During the Vietnam War, the brigade, less the 3rd Battalion of the 137th Infantry, was ordered to active duty in May 1968. The brigade served at Fort Carson attached to the 5th Infantry Division until its demobilization in December 1969. The brigade was used to provide replacements for troops in Vietnam. 40 men of the brigade were killed in action, with hundreds being wounded.

In the mid-1980s, two new Army National Guard divisions were formed, drawing on existing independent brigades. The headquarters of the 35th Infantry Division was reformed by the Kansas Army National Guard. The 69th Infantry Brigade joined the new division, alongside brigades from Nebraska and Kentucky. In the late 1980s, aviation regiments were formed within the U.S. Army and the Army National Guard. The state maintained the 69th Infantry Brigade as part of the 35th Infantry Division from the 1980s to the 1990s or later.

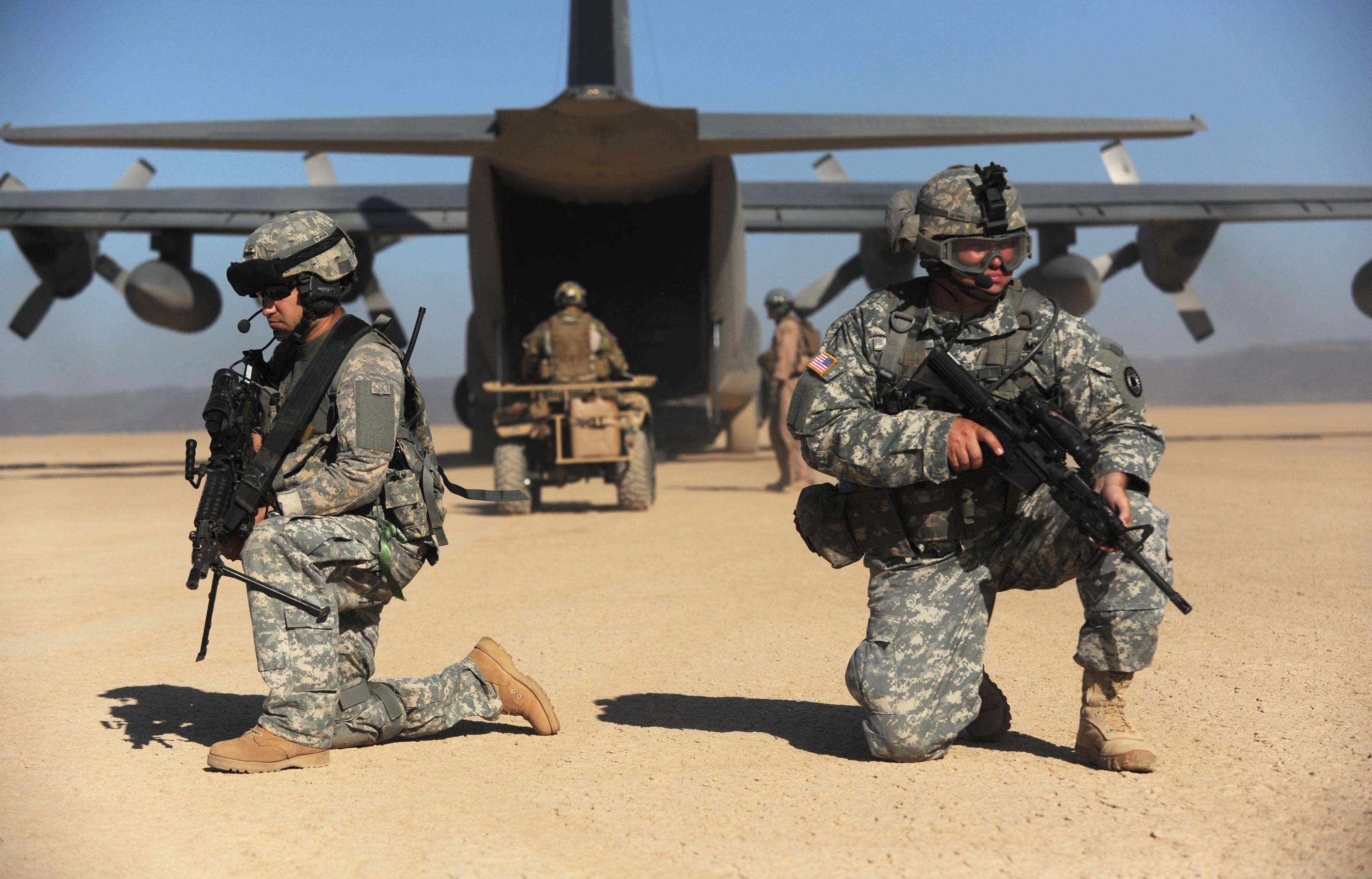
Kansas Army National Guardsmen during an exercise, February 26, 2011

Kansas Army National Guard personnel also saw service during Operations Desert Shield/Desert Storm, 1990–1991; Operations Northern and Southern Watch in Southwest Asia, 1992–2002; Operation Restore Hope in Somalia, 1992–1993; Operations Joint Endeavor, Deny Flight and Joint Guardian in Bosnia-Herzegovina, 1995–2003; Operations Phoenix Scorpion, Phoenix Scorpion III and Desert Fox in Southwest Asia, 1997 and 1998; Operation Allied Force in Kosovo, 1999–present; Operation Enduring Freedom and Operation Noble Eagle, 2001–present; and Operation Iraqi Freedom, 2003–2011, Combined Joint Task Force-Horn of Africa 2010–2011.

The 635th Armor Regiment was constituted in the Air National Guard on March 25, 1953, as the 891st Engineer Aviation Battalion. On August 1, 1953, it was allotted to the Kansas National Guard. It was reorganized and federally recognized January 13, 1954 with headquarters at Manhattan, Kansas. The regiment was redesignated in January 1957 as the 891st Engineer Battalion. It was converted again to the 635th Armor on February 1, 1976, consisting of the 1st Battalion. In 1984 the battalion was part of the 69th Infantry Brigade. It was reorganized again on March 1, 1990, to comprise the 1st and 2nd Battalions at Manhattan and Salina, respectively.

About 350 soldiers of the 1st Battalion, 635th Armor, departed on the first leg of a deployment to Kosovo on October 27, 2004, as part of NATO's peacekeeping operation in the former Yugoslavia. On January 27, 2006, they returned from their 15-month deployment to Kosovo. While there, they had provided force protection and fixed and roving security, as well as escort duty. In October 2020, the 2nd Combined Arms Battalion, 137th Infantry, was redesignated as the 1st Battalion, 635th Armored, retaining its combined arms status.

On 1 September 2008, the inactive 1st Battalion, 137th Infantry was consolidated with the active 635th Armored Regiment, and the consolidated unit was redesignated as the 1st Battalion, 635th Armored Regiment.

In the spring of 2004, the 2nd Battalion, 137th Infantry received their Bradley Fighting Vehicles and began training to assume an active role in Afghanistan or Iraq. The Battalion was called to active duty in early August 2005. The Battalion was sent to Fort Sill, Oklahoma, and then to the National Training Center, Fort Irwin, California for pre-deployment training. They served for one year during the War in Iraq (Operation Iraqi Freedom) from October 2005 to October 2006, with the XVIII Airborne Corps, the 3rd and the 4th Infantry Divisions. One of the battalion's soldiers was killed in action. The 2–137th returned to Kansas in November 2006.

In March 2010, the 137th Infantry Regiment was activated for service in the Global War on Terror and conducted predeployment training at Kansas Regional Training Center, Salina, Kansas and Joint Base Lewis-McChord, Washington. The unit arrived in Djibouti, Africa in May 2010 under United States Africa Command tasked with providing force protection to Camp Lemonnier and Combined Joint Task Force-Africa. The Battalion also supported DOD and State Department missions building capacities among partner nations across east Africa. The unit redeployed through Camp McCoy, Wisconsin in April 2011 having earned the Meritorious Unit Commendation.

The Kansas Army National Guard is commanded by Brigadier General Carlin G. Williams. Its chief of staff is Colonel Rodney Seaba, and its command sergeant major is Chris Hargis.

Historic Units:

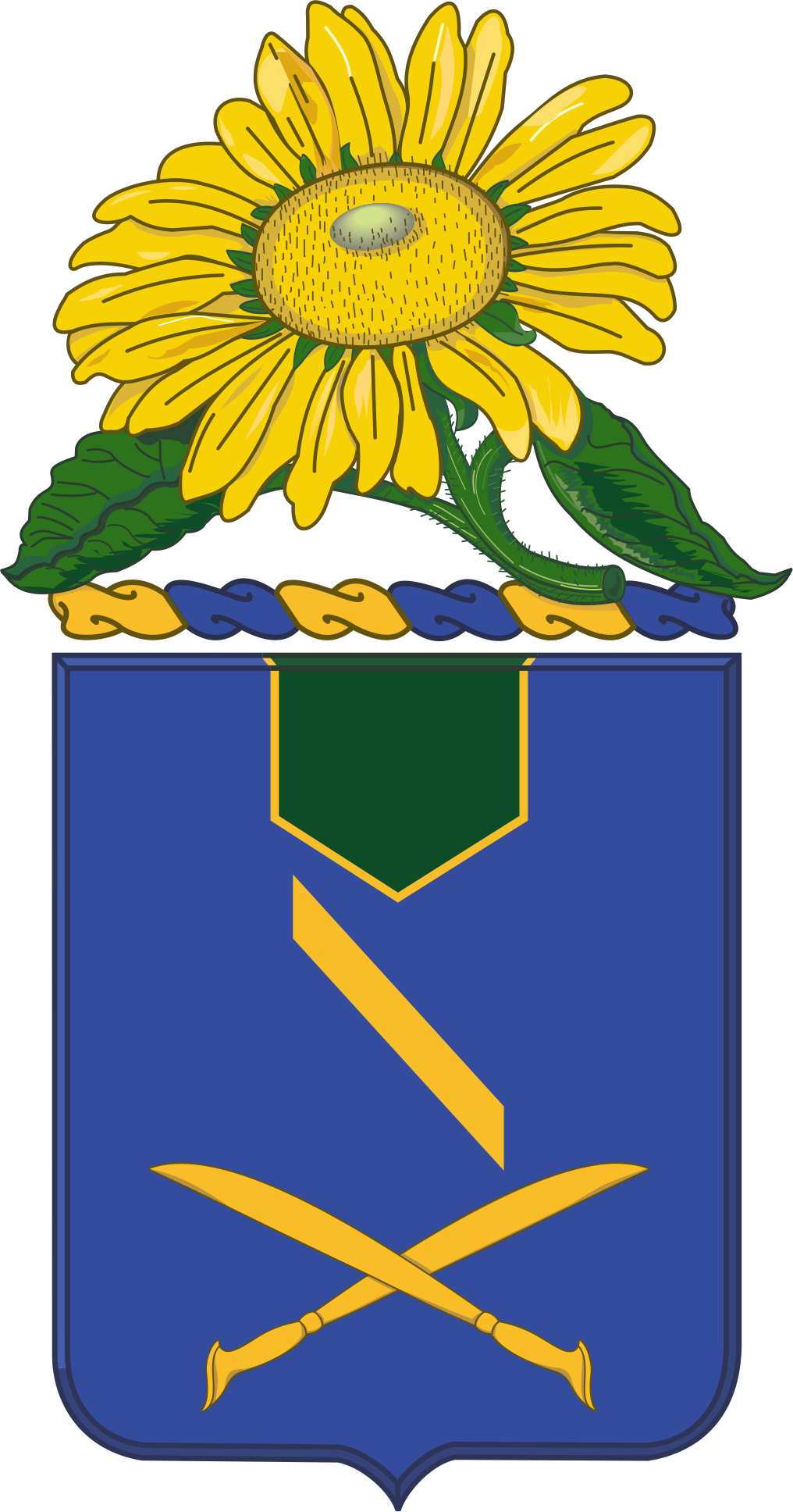
- 2nd Battalion, 137th Infantry Regiment CAB, now called the 1st Battalion, 635th Armor part of the 155th Armored Brigade Combat Team. The 2/137th INF CAB was originally the 635th Armor Regiment before being deactivated in September 2008, its former troops becoming part of the 2nd Battalion (Combined Arms Battalion), 137th Infantry Regiment, consisting of two Armor companies and one infantry company; then the battalion was again redesignated back to 1-635 Armor in October 2020.
- 127th Field Artillery Regiment (deactivated January 28, 2007)
- 130th Field Artillery Regiment
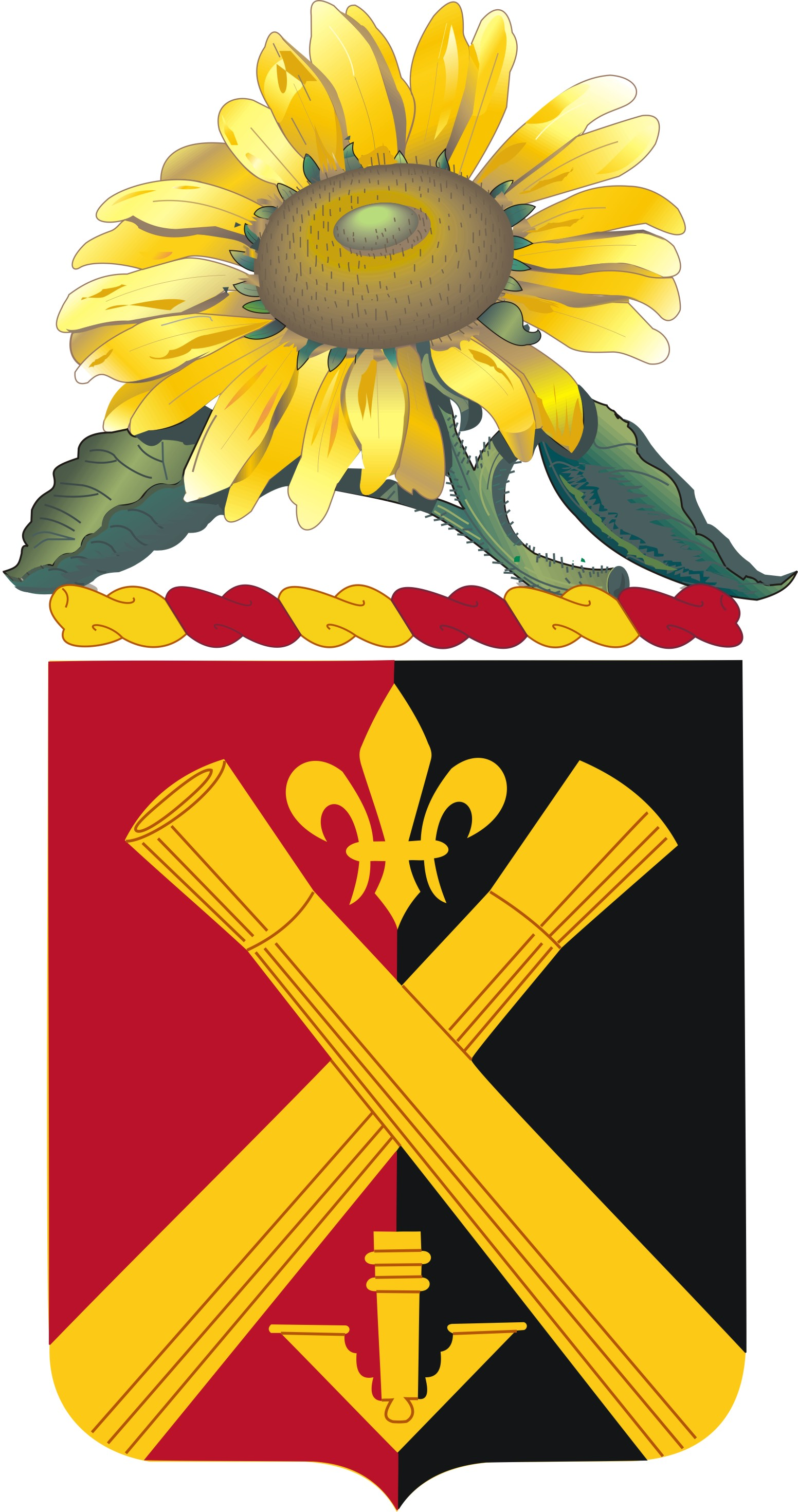
- 1st Howitzer Battalion, 235th Artillery – Divisional artillery battalion of the 35th Infantry Division 1959–1963. Reorganized from 135th Antiaircraft Artillery Automatic Weapons Battalion, organized 1949, which inherited the lineage of the 635th Tank Destroyer Battalion. Battalion eliminated together with 35th Infantry Division, Headquarters and Headquarters Battery at Hays and Battery A at Russell became 995th Ordnance Company. Heraldry inherited by 235th RTI.
- 130th Field Artillery Brigade (reactivated October 19, 2014) The brigade's history in the Kansas Army National Guard dates back to 1917, where its lineage can be traced through both World Wars as part of the 35th Infantry Division, the Korean War and, most recently, Operation Iraqi Freedom. On June 1, 1978, the 130th was redesignated as the 130th Field Artillery Brigade. In 1985 it was again redesignated as the 35th Division Artillery with the reactivation of the 35th Infantry Division. The 130th was reconstituted again on Sept. 2, 1997, in the Kansas Army National Guard in Topeka. Following its deployment in Operation Iraqi Freedom, the brigade was inactivated on Nov. 10, 2007.
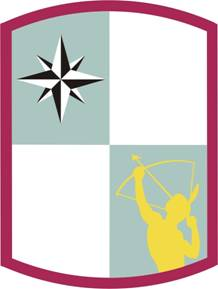
- 287th Sustainment Brigade

== Organization ==
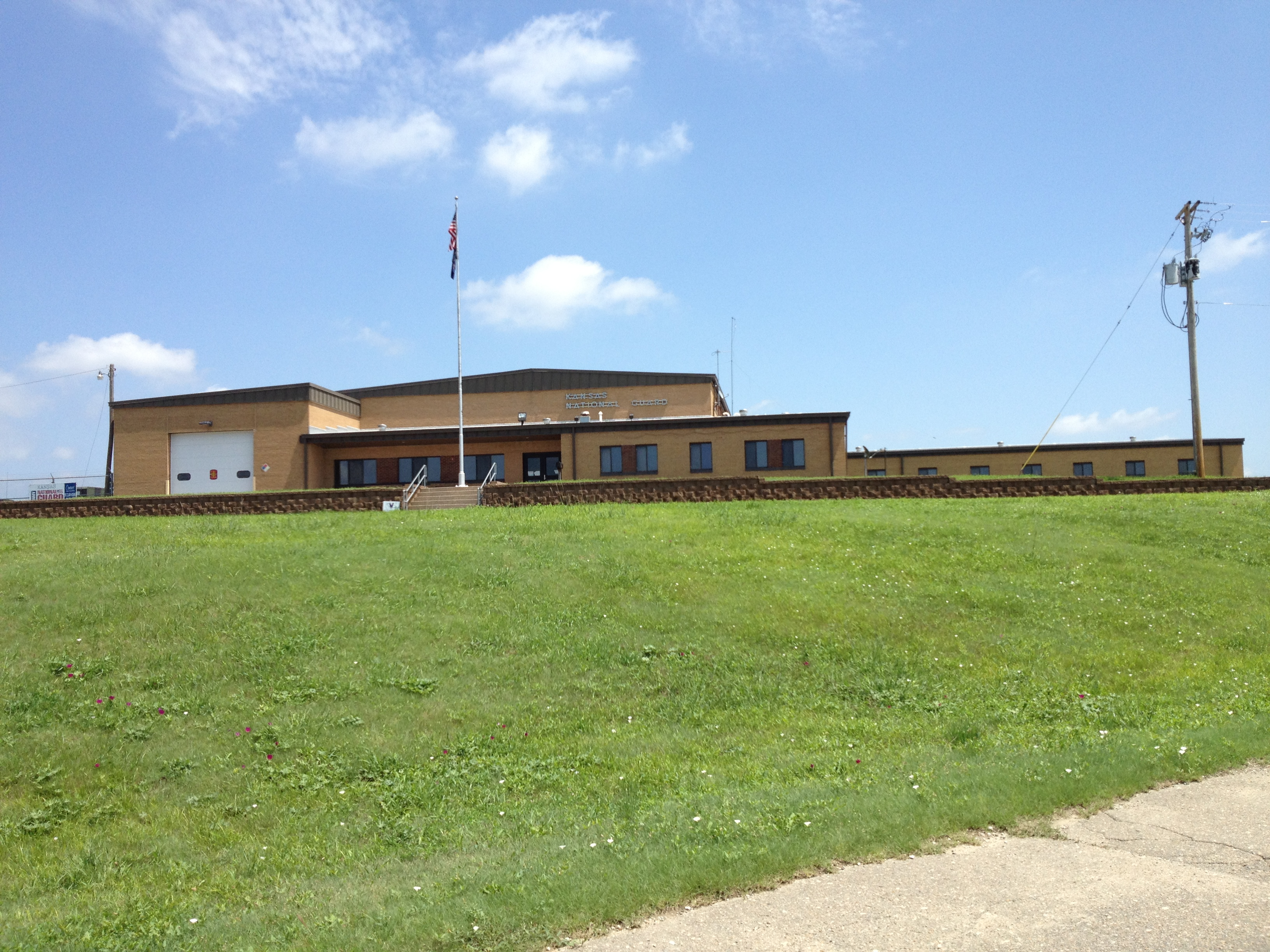
The Kansas Army National Guard armory in Concordia, Kansas is a typical building used for National Guard training and administration.

As of February 2026 the Kansas Army National Guard consists of the following units:

- Joint Force Headquarters-Kansas, Army Element, in Topeka
  - Headquarters and Headquarters Detachment, Joint Force Headquarters-Kansas, Army Element, in Topeka
  - Kansas Recruiting & Retention Battalion, in Topeka
    - Company A, Kansas Recruiting & Retention Battalion, in Topeka
    - Company B, Kansas Recruiting & Retention Battalion, in Wichita
  - 73rd Civil Support Team (WMD), at Jefferson City Airport
  - Army Aviation Support Facility #1, at Forbes Field
  - Army Aviation Support Facility #2, at Salina Airport
  - Combined Support Maintenance Shop #1, in Topeka
  - Maneuver Area Training Equipment Site #1, at Camp Funston
  - Unit Training Equipment Site #1, in Salina
  - Field Maintenance Shop #1, in Hays
  - Field Maintenance Shop #2, in Iola
  - Field Maintenance Shop #3, in Wichita
  - Field Maintenance Shop #7, in Kansas City
  - Field Maintenance Shop #8, in Ottawa
  - Field Maintenance Shop #13, in Dodge City
  - 35th Infantry Division, at Fort Leavenworth
    - Headquarters and Headquarters Battalion, 35th Infantry Division, at Fort Leavenworth
      - Headquarters Support Company, 35th Infantry Division, at Fort Leavenworth
        - Detachment 1, Headquarters Support Company, 35th Infantry Division, in Lexington (MO) — (Missouri Army National Guard)
      - Company A (Operations), Headquarters and Headquarters Battalion, 35th Infantry Division, at Fort Leavenworth
        - Detachment 1, Company A (Operations), Headquarters and Headquarters Battalion, 35th Infantry Division, in St. Joseph (MO) — (Missouri Army National Guard)
      - Company B (Intelligence and Sustainment), Headquarters and Headquarters Battalion, 35th Infantry Division, at Jefferson Barracks (MO) — (Missouri Army National Guard)
        - Detachment 1, Company B (Intelligence and Sustainment), Headquarters and Headquarters Battalion, 35th Infantry Division, at Fort Leavenworth
        - Detachment 2, Company B (Intelligence and Sustainment), Headquarters and Headquarters Battalion, 35th Infantry Division, in St. Joseph (MO) — (Missouri Army National Guard)
      - Company C (Signal), Headquarters and Headquarters Battalion, 35th Infantry Division, in St. Joseph (MO) — (Missouri Army National Guard)
      - 35th Infantry Division Band, in Olathe
    - 35th Division Artillery, at Fort Leavenworth
      - Headquarters and Headquarters Battery, 35th Division Artillery, at Fort Leavenworth
      - 169th Division Sustainment Support Battalion, in Olathe (part of 35th Division Sustainment Brigade)
        - Headquarters and Headquarters Company, 169th Division Sustainment Support Battalion, in Olathe
        - Company A (Composite Supply Company), 169th Division Sustainment Support Battalion, in Memphis (TN) — (Tennessee Army National Guard)
          - Detachment 1, Company A, 169th Division Sustainment Support Battalion, in Erwin (TN)
        - Company B (Support Maintenance Company), 169th Division Sustainment Support Battalion, in Smith Center
          - Detachment 1, Company B, 169th Division Sustainment Support Battalion, in Concordia
          - Detachment 2, Company B, 169th Division Sustainment Support Battalion, in Norton
        - Company C (Composite Truck Company), 169th Division Sustainment Support Battalion, in Great Bend
          - Detachment 1, Company C, 169th Division Sustainment Support Battalion, in Liberal
          - Detachment 2, Company C, 169th Division Sustainment Support Battalion, in Wichita
          - Detachment 3, Company C, 169th Division Sustainment Support Battalion, at Fort Riley
        - 1077th Medical Company (Ground Ambulance), in Lenexa
  - 69th Troop Command, in Topeka
    - Headquarters and Headquarters Company, 69th Troop Command, in Topeka
    - Kansas Medical Detachment, in Topeka
    - 105th Mobile Public Affairs Detachment, in Topeka
    - 117th Medical Company (Area Support), in Wichita
    - 174th Quartermaster Platoon (Field Feeding), in Wichita
    - 714th Quartermaster Platoon (Field Feeding), in Kansas City
    - 1074th Judge Advocate General Trial Defense Team, in Topeka
    - 1174th Judge Advocate General Trial Defense Team, in Topeka
    - 1979th Support Detachment (Contracting Team), Topeka
    - 1st Battalion (Assault), 108th Aviation Regiment, at Forbes Field
      - Headquarters and Headquarters Company, 1st Battalion (Assault), 108th Aviation Regiment, at Forbes Field
        - Detachment 1, Headquarters and Headquarters Company, 1st Battalion (Assault), 108th Aviation Regiment, at Austin–Bergstrom Airport (TX) — (Texas Army National Guard)
        - Detachment 2, Headquarters and Headquarters Company, 1st Battalion (Assault), 108th Aviation Regiment, at Salina Airport
      - Company A, 1st Battalion (Assault), 108th Aviation Regiment, at Forbes Field (UH-60M Black Hawk)
      - Company B, 1st Battalion (Assault), 108th Aviation Regiment, at Salina Airport (UH-60M Black Hawk)
      - Company C, 1st Battalion (Assault), 108th Aviation Regiment, at Austin–Bergstrom Airport (TX) (UH-60M Black Hawk) — (Texas Army National Guard)
      - Company D (AVUM), 1st Battalion (Assault), 108th Aviation Regiment, at Forbes Field
        - Detachment 1, Company D (AVUM), 1st Battalion (Assault), 108th Aviation Regiment, at Austin–Bergstrom Airport (TX) — (Texas Army National Guard)
        - Detachment 2, Company D (AVUM), 1st Battalion (Assault), 108th Aviation Regiment, at Salina Airport
      - Company E (Forward Support), 1st Battalion (Assault), 108th Aviation Regiment, at Forbes Field
        - Detachment 1, Company E (Forward Support), 1st Battalion (Assault), 108th Aviation Regiment, at Austin–Bergstrom Airport (TX) — (Texas Army National Guard)
        - Detachment 2, Company E (Forward Support), 1st Battalion (Assault), 108th Aviation Regiment, at Salina Airport
      - Company G (MEDEVAC), 1st Battalion (General Support Aviation), 111th Aviation Regiment, at Forbes Field (HH-60L Black Hawk)
        - Detachment 5, Company D (AVUM), 1st Battalion (General Support Aviation), 111th Aviation Regiment, at Forbes Field
        - Detachment 6, Company E (Forward Support), 1st Battalion (General Support Aviation), 111th Aviation Regiment, at Forbes Field
      - Detachment 1, Company C, 2nd Battalion (Fixed Wing), 641st Aviation Regiment (Detachment 37, Operational Support Airlift Activity), at Forbes Field (C-12 Huron)
  - 130th Field Artillery Brigade, in Manhattan
    - Headquarters and Headquarters Battery, 130th Field Artillery Brigade, in Manhattan
    - 1st Battalion, 129th Field Artillery Regiment, in Maryville (MO) (M777A2) — (Missouri Army National Guard)
    - 2nd Battalion, 130th Field Artillery Regiment, in Hiawatha (M142 HIMARS)
      - Headquarters and Headquarters Battery, 2nd Battalion, 130th Field Artillery Regiment, in Hiawatha
        - Detachment 1, Headquarters and Headquarters Battery, 2nd Battalion, 130th Field Artillery Regiment, in Marysville
      - Battery A, 2nd Battalion, 130th Field Artillery Regiment, in Holton
        - Detachment 1, Battery A, 2nd Battalion, 130th Field Artillery Regiment, in Marysville
      - Battery B, 2nd Battalion, 130th Field Artillery Regiment, in Paola
        - Detachment 1, Battery B, 2nd Battalion, 130th Field Artillery Regiment, in Kansas City
      - 250th Forward Support Company, in Ottawa
        - Detachment 1, 250th Forward Support Company, in Clay Center
    - 1st Battalion, 161st Field Artillery Regiment, in Hutchinson (M109A6 Paladin)
      - Headquarters and Headquarters Battery, 1st Battalion, 161st Field Artillery Regiment, in Hutchinson
      - Battery A, 1st Battalion, 161st Field Artillery Regiment, in Dodge City
      - Battery B, 1st Battalion, 161st Field Artillery Regiment, in Abilene
      - Battery C, 1st Battalion, 161st Field Artillery Regiment, in Newton
      - 1161st Forward Support Company, in Wichita
        - Detachment 1, 1161st Forward Support Company, in Pratt
    - 1st Battalion, 214th Field Artillery Regiment, in Elberton (GA) (M109A6 Paladin) — (Georgia Army National Guard)
    - 997th Brigade Support Battalion, in Hays
      - Headquarters Support Battery, 997th Brigade Support Battalion, in Hays
      - Detachment 1, Headquarters Support Battery, 997th Brigade Support Battalion, in Colby
      - 137th Transportation Company (Medium Truck) (PLS), in Olathe
        - Detachment 1, 137th Transportation Company (Medium Truck) (PLS), in Topeka
      - 170th Ordnance Company (Support Maintenance), in Wichita
      - 330th Signal Company, in Wichita
  - 635th Regional Support Group, in Topeka
    - Headquarters and Headquarters Company, 635th Regional Support Group, in Topeka
    - 1st Battalion, 635th Armor Regiment, in Kansas City (part of 155th Armored Brigade Combat Team)
      - Headquarters and Headquarters Company, 1st Battalion, 635th Armor Regiment, in Kansas City
        - Detachment 1, Headquarters and Headquarters Company, 1st Battalion, 635th Armor Regiment, in Junction City
        - Detachment 1, Headquarters and Headquarters Battery, 2nd Battalion, 114th Field Artillery Regiment, in Junction City
      - Company A (Tank), 1st Battalion, 635th Armor Regiment, in Emporia
      - Company B (Tank), 1st Battalion, 635th Armor Regiment, in Lawrence
      - Company C (Mechanized Infantry), 1st Battalion, 635th Armor Regiment, in Wichita
        - Detachment 1, Company C (Mechanized Infantry), 1st Battalion, 635th Armor Regiment, in Lawrence
      - Company G (Forward Support), 106th Brigade Support Battalion, in Manhattan
        - Detachment 1, Company G (Forward Support), 106th Brigade Support Battalion, in Kansas City
    - 891st Engineer Battalion, in Iola
      - Headquarters and Headquarters Company, 891st Engineer Battalion, in Iola
      - Forward Support Company, 891st Engineer Battalion, in Iola
      - 35th Military Police (Combat Support), in Topeka
      - 226th Engineer Company (Vertical Construction Company), in Augusta
        - Detachment 1, 226th Engineer Company (Vertical Construction Company), in Salina
      - 242nd Engineer Company (Engineer Construction Company), in Coffeyville
        - Detachment 1, 242nd Engineer Company (Engineer Construction Company), in Wichita
        - Detachment 2, 242nd Engineer Company (Engineer Construction Company), in Pittsburg
  - 235th Regiment, Regional Training Institute, in Salina
    - 1st Battalion (Officer Candidate/ Warrant Officer Candidate School), 235th Regiment, in Salina
    - 2nd Battalion (Modular Training), 235th Regiment, in Salina
    - Regional Training Site-Maintenance, in Salina
    - Kansas Army National Guard Training Center, in Salina
    - 137th Chaplain Detachment, in Salina

== See also ==
- Kansas–Armenia National Guard Partnership
- Kansas State Guard
- Lawrence armory
