= Lawrence armory (Lawrence, Kansas) =

Lawrence Armory
- Massachusetts Street, Lawrence, Kansas

Site information
- Type: town armory
- Controlled by: local militia

Site history
- Built: c. June 1863
- In use: c. June 1863 to possibly spring 1864

Lawrence Kansas Army National Guard Armory
- 200 Iowa St., Lawrence, Kansas

Site information
- Type: Army National Guard armory
- Controlled by: Kansas Army National Guard

Site history
- Built: c. 1950s
- In use: c. 1950s to present (as of October 2012)
- Materials: brick, steel

Garrison information
- Garrison: same

Two structures in Lawrence have been known as the Lawrence Armory - the Civil War era armory and the Lawrence Kansas Army National Guard Armory.

== Civil War era armory ==
The first armory in Lawrence was located on the 600 block of Massachusetts Street in the downtown. The exact coordinates of the armory are today unknown, but they are approximately at 38.9721°N 95.2359°W . This armory was probably established in June 1863 to contain the muskets provided by the State of Kansas and all firearms owned by the individual residents of town. The city government had passed an ordinance forbidding anyone from keeping their weapons anywhere but the armory. Peter D. Ridenour, a local businessman, wrote later that the sixty muskets, to be used by the local militia to defend Lawrence, were old and rusty and not much good.

On August 21, 1863, William C. Quantrill and about 400 Confederate guerrillas and regular army recruits raided Lawrence. Quantrill came so fast that none of the town's defenders was able to reach the armory before the guerrillas took control of it. A few persons had kept their guns at home in defiance of the city ordinance, so a bit of scattered resistance occurred. Two camps of recruits also had no arms with them and were mercilessly gunned down. Ironically, of all the business structures on Massachusetts Street only the armory and one other building were left standing. Most of the armory's guns were left in the armory by the guerrillas.

Just two days later the guerrillas were rumored to be heading again toward Lawrence. This time a number of men went to the armory and armed themselves with the guns there. The rumor turned out to be false. In 1864 blockhouses were built to allow the local militia to defend Lawrence and by that time the use of the armory appeared to have ceased.

== Lawrence Kansas Army National Guard Armory ==
The coordinates of this armory are known, as it has existed for years, probably being built in the 1950s. The coordinates are 38.9798°N 95.2599°W. The Lawrence Kansas Army National Guard Armory sits on a triangle of land bound on the north by West 2nd Street, on the west by Iowa Street and along the east by McDonald Drive. McDonald Drive runs from the northeast to the southwest of the armory, intersecting both 2nd and Iowa streets. The Kansas Army National Guard owns the entire triangle of land occupied by the armory buildings and parking area. McDonald connects the Kansas Turnpike from the north to U.S. Highway 40 to the south. The armory can be located on satellite imagery.
