= 69th Infantry Brigade (United States) =

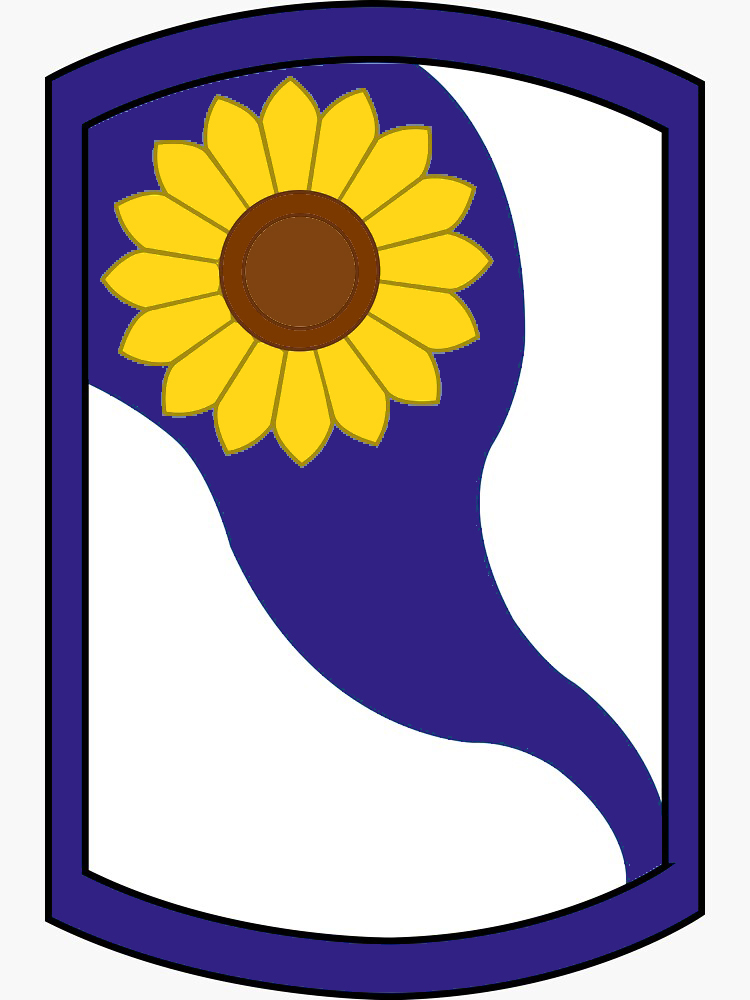
- Shoulder Sleeve Insignia of the 69th Infantry Brigade (Separate)
- Active: 1917–1919; 1921–1942; 1963–1984; 1984–1997
- Country: United States
- Branch: United States Army
- Type: Infantry
- Size: Brigade
- Engagements: World War I

Commanders
- Notable commanders: Nathaniel Fish McClure; Arthur Barrett Donnelly

The 69th Infantry Brigade was a brigade of the Kansas Army National Guard and Nebraska Army National Guard, which saw service with the 35th Infantry Division during World War I.

== World War I ==
The brigade was formed in August 1917 as part of the 35th Division, of the Kansas and Missouri National Guards. It fought with the American Expeditionary Forces in France. It included the 137th Infantry Regiment from Kansas and the 138th Infantry Regiment from Missouri. On 27 April 1919 the brigade headquarters arrived at Newport News aboard the USS Princess Matoika, before being demobilized at Camp Funston on 8 May.

== Interwar period and World War II ==
The 69th Infantry Brigade was reconstituted in the National Guard in 1921, assigned to the 35th Division, and allotted to the state of Kansas. It controlled the 134th and 137th Infantry Regiments, of the Nebraska and Kansas National Guards, respectively. The Headquarters and Headquarters Company were organized at Topeka, Kansas and federally recognized on 24 October 1922. The Headquarters was relocated to Wichita, Kansas in 1925 and to the National Military Home at Leavenworth, Kansas, 15 January 1930.

The Headquarters was inactivated at Leavenworth on 6 June 1932, withdrawn from the state of Kansas on 16 August 1932, and concurrently allotted to the state of Nebraska and organized at Omaha, Nebraska. The Headquarters Company remained allotted to the state of Kansas at Topeka. On 23 December 1940, the brigade was inducted into Federal service at Omaha, moving to Camp Joseph T. Robinson on 7 January 1941 with the division. After the Attack on Pearl Harbor resulted in the United States entry into World War II, the brigade transferred to Fort Ord on 23 December. It moved to Camp San Luis Obispo on 17 January 1942, and was ordered to be disbanded as soon as was practicable after 3 February 1942, as US Army infantry divisions were being reorganized into a triangular organization, eliminating the need for brigades. On 1 March 1942, the Headquarters was disbanded, while the Headquarters Company became the 35th Cavalry Reconnaissance Troop (Mechanized) of the division.

== 69th Infantry Brigade (Separate) ==
In 1963, the 35th Infantry Division was inactivated, and on 1 April 1963, the Kansas portion of the division was redesignated as the 69th Infantry Brigade (Separate).

The brigade was then mobilized for training at Fort Carson during the Vietnam War. In a message received from the Department of the Army dated April 11, 1968, the 69th Infantry Brigade was ordered to active duty effective May 13, 1968, in order to replace the 1st Brigade, 5th Infantry Division (Mechanized), stationed in Vietnam. The 69th Brigade was integrated into the 5th Infantry Division as a replacement for the brigade in Vietnam, to bolster manpower. Actually, the 69th Brigade, along with other units, was recalled to active duty due to the capture of the intelligence-gathering ship USS Pueblo (AGER-2) by North Korea. The crisis forced the President to mobilize approximately 200,000 members of the Reserve and National Guard. The 69th Brigade's units were attached to their counterparts in the 5th Infantry Division. The 169th Support Battalion was attached to the Division Support Command, and later became the divisional maintenance unit; 2-133 FA became part of the divisional artillery; the cavalry troop joined the divisional cavalry; and the 169th Engineer Company became part of the divisional engineer battalion. Later the active duty maintenance battalion was inactivated, and the 169th Support Battalion taking on the entire task.

The 3rd Battalion, 137th Infantry, was not included in the call to active duty for two reasons; to leave a unit available in Kansas in the event of civil disturbances or major natural disaster; and because the battalion was newly reorganized as an infantry unit and had not yet completed Advanced Unit Training. The 3rd Battalion of the 137th Infantry was replaced by the 2nd Battalion, 133rd Infantry, an Iowa National Guard unit that had previously been assigned to the 67th Mechanized Brigade. The 69th Brigade arrived at Fort Carson in May 1968, and some personnel began to be levied for Vietnam duty in July, arriving in-theater in October. After return from Fort Carson, on December 12, 1969 demobilization ceremonies were held at various armories throughout Kansas and Iowa. The 69th Brigade officially reverted to state control on December 13, 1969. 324 officers and 2,073 enlisted men of the Brigade served in Vietnam and 40 died, with hundreds being wounded.

On 25 August 1984, it was converted into the headquarters of the reactivated 35th Infantry Division (Mechanized), and another brigade headquarters appears to have been formed from the remainder of the brigade headquarters. In 1984–85, the 69th Infantry Brigade was reported to comprise the 1st and 2nd Battalions of the 137th Infantry Regiment, the 1st Battalion, 635th Armored Regiment, 1st Battalion, 127th Field Artillery, Troop E, 114th Cavalry, and the 169th Engineer Company. The brigade was redesignated as the 69th Brigade, 35th Infantry Division, serving with it until 1 September 1997, when it was redesignated as the 130th Field Artillery Brigade.
