= 287th Sustainment Brigade =

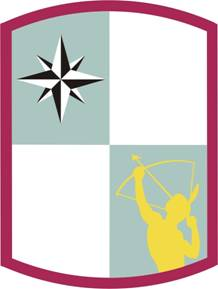
- 287th Sustainment Brigade shoulder sleeve insignia
- Active: September 2005 – May 2016
- Country: United States
- Allegiance: Kansas
- Branch: United States Army
- Role: Sustainment
- Size: Brigade
- Part of: United States Army National Guard
- Garrison/HQ: Wichita East Armory, Kanas
- Motto: Sustain the Victor
- Engagements: Iraq War

Insignia
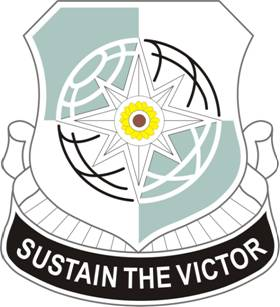
- Distinctive Unit Insignia

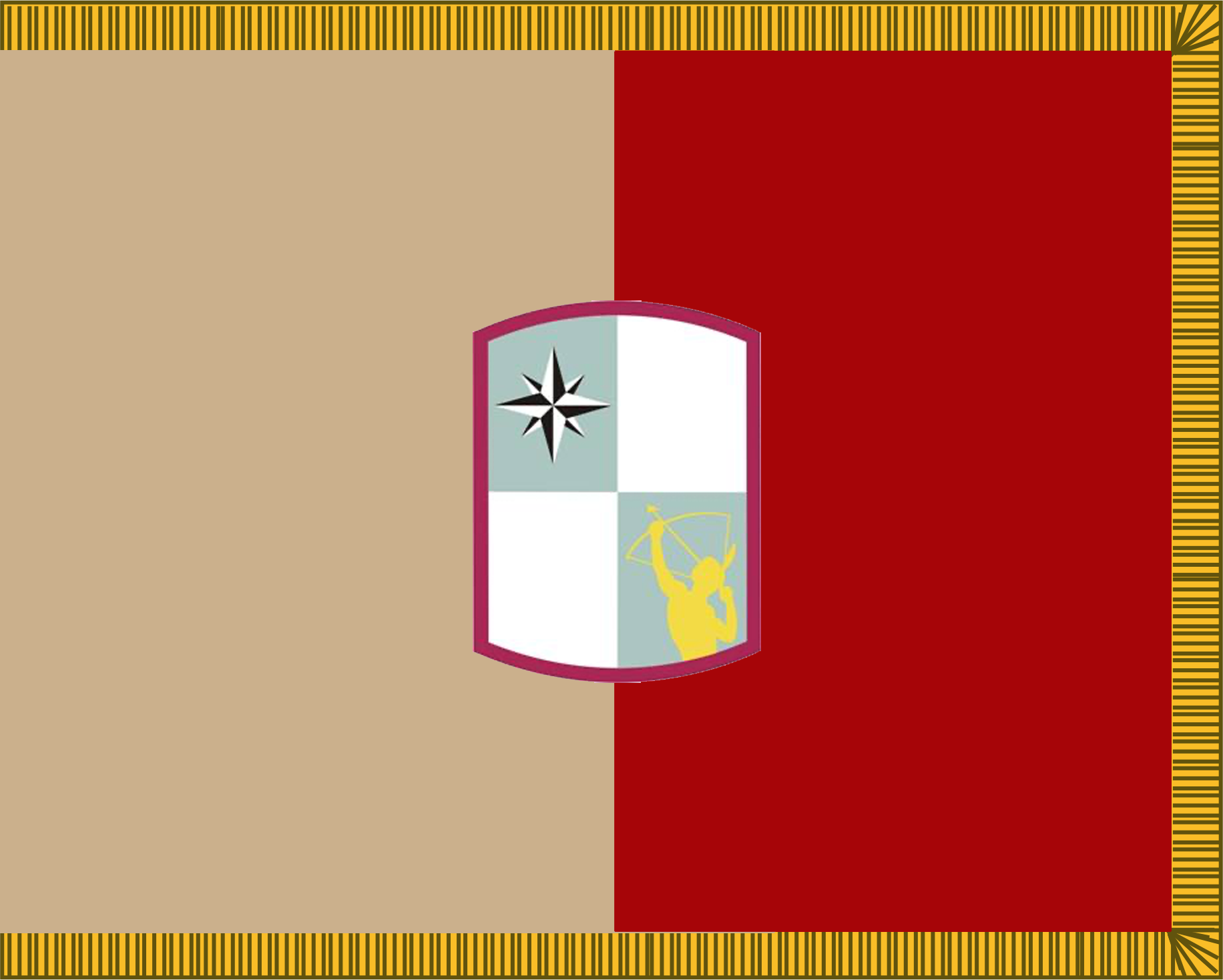
- 287th Sustainment Brigade Flag

The 287th Sustainment Brigade was a sustainment brigade of the Kansas Army National Guard. The Brigade was activated on 1 September 2005, and is headquartered in Wichita. Its mission was to plan, prepare, execute and assess combat service support operations within a corps or division Area of Operations. It was the largest brigade-level headquarters in the state. In 2015, it was announced that the brigade would be deactivating in FY2016. The brigade was deactivated on 1 May 2016.

Units included:

- HHC 287th
- 287th Special Troops Battalion
- 891st Engineer Battalion
- 169th Corps Support Sustainment Battalion (CSSB)

== History ==
The brigade deployed to Iraq between 2008 and 2009, where it provided logistical support for Coalition troops.
