= Camp Merriam (California) =

U.S. military encampment

- Part of Department of the Pacific
- San Francisco
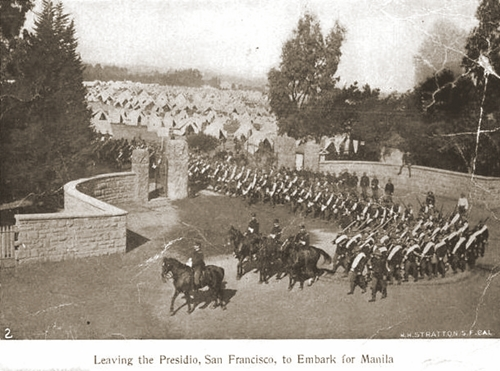
- Troops departing from Camp Merriam through the Lombard gate, 1895.

Location
- Coordinates: 37°47′54.46″N 122°26′52.43″W

Site history
- In use: July 1898-about 1902

Camp Merriam, California was a U.S. military camp for American troops destined for the Philippines during the Spanish–American War. Located at the San Francisco Presidio, the camp, named after Major General Henry C. Merriam, the Commanding General of the Department of the Pacific. Camp Merriam was located on the hills just north of the Lombard Street entrance to the Presidio of San Francisco. The camp was established in 1898 to quarter and train volunteer soldiers from California, Iowa, Kansas, and South Dakota for service during the Spanish-American War.

== Commissioning ==
Camp Merriam was established in July 1898 when it became clear that Camp Merrit, which had been used up until then for quartering and training the volunteer armies before being shipped out to the Philippines to support the war effort there, was no longer capable of fulfilling its mission. Major General Merriam had already been given command of the Department of the Pacific, which included all military operations of the western states of the U.S. as well as those currently in operation on the Islands of Hawaii. On July 19, 1898, Brigadier General Marcus P. Miller, the commanding general of the Volunteer Armies being processed through Camp Merritt received a telegram from the Secretary of War directing that "... all commanding officers of regiments at Camp Merritt report to General Merriam for further equipment and instructions ..." and that "... Camp Merritt had been condemned and that all troops will be immediately moved to the Presidio." This was after the San Francisco Chamber of Commerce had determined that "... the location of Camp Merrit is wholly unfit for the purpose to which it is now being put, and that if it is continued as a camp much longer the health of the city will be impaired." According to a different report in the same source, "The sanitary condition of the camp [is] daily proving worse, and unless speedy action is taken there is every possibility of a spread of infectious diseases." The source also states that "... within ten minutes after these instructions came from the War Department the initial steps for the removal were taken."

== Units processed through Camp Merriam ==
Confirmed Units processed through Camp Merriam:

- 1st Tennessee Volunteer Infantry (Col. William Crawford Smith commanding) (Arrived at Camp Merritt in June 1898 and quickly moved to Camp Merriam)

== Decommissioning ==
See.
