= Camp Merritt, California =

U.S. camp during the Spanish–American War

Camp Merritt
- Part of Department of California
- San Francisco
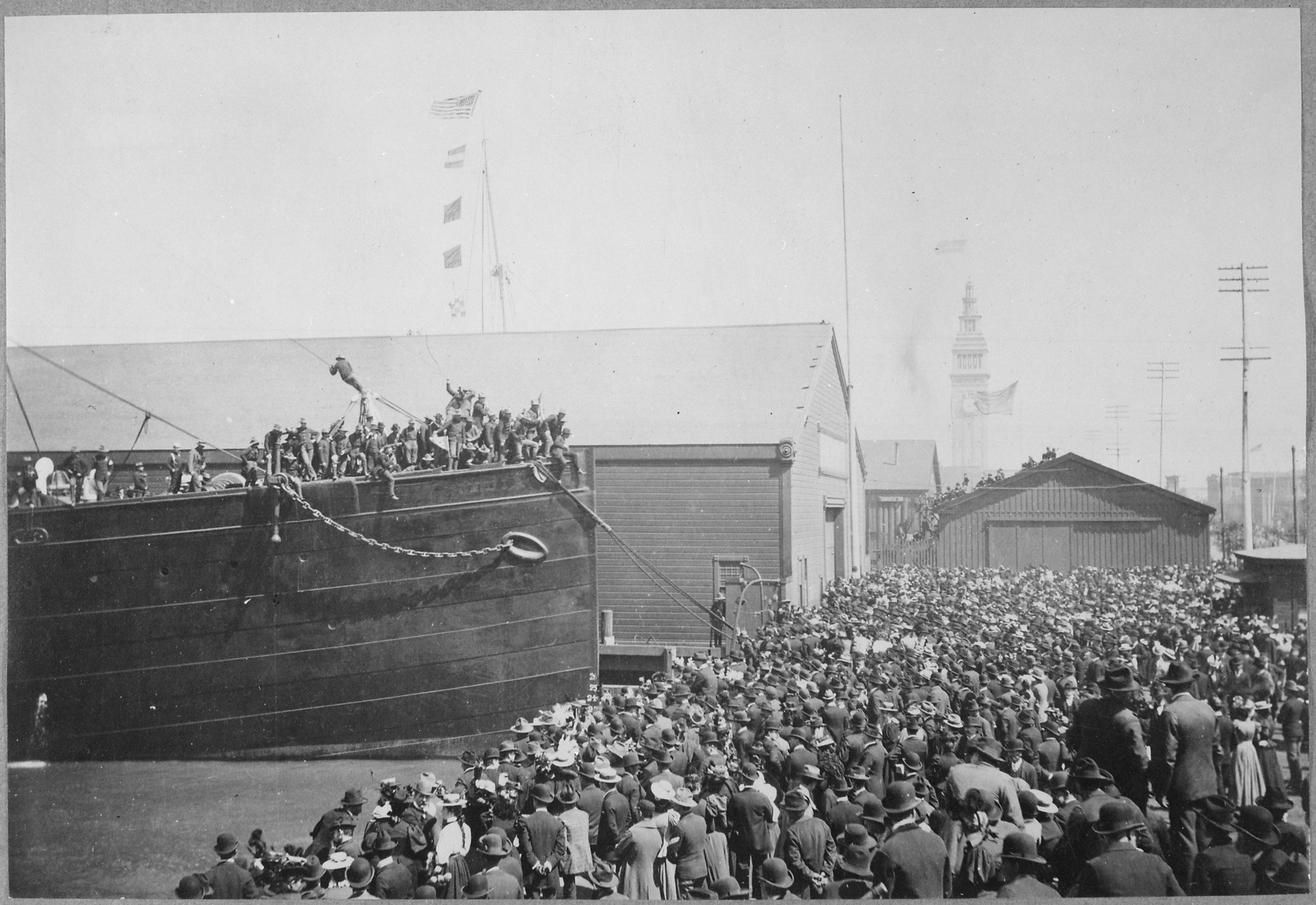
- Transport Indiana receiving troops and freight at Pacific Mail Docks, 1898.

Location
- Coordinates: 37°46′35.51″N 122°27′42.89″W

Site history
- In use: May 1898 – August 1898

Camp Merritt, California was a U.S. military camp used for the quartering and preparation of American troops destined for the Philippines during the Spanish–American War. Formerly a racetrack, it was named for General Wesley Merritt, the commanding general of the U.S. Voluntary Army forces and the Eighth Army Corps. The camp was located in San Francisco, California in an area approximately bounded by what is now Point Lobos Avenue (Geary), Fulton Street, First (Arguello) Avenue and Sixth Avenue.

== Commissioning ==
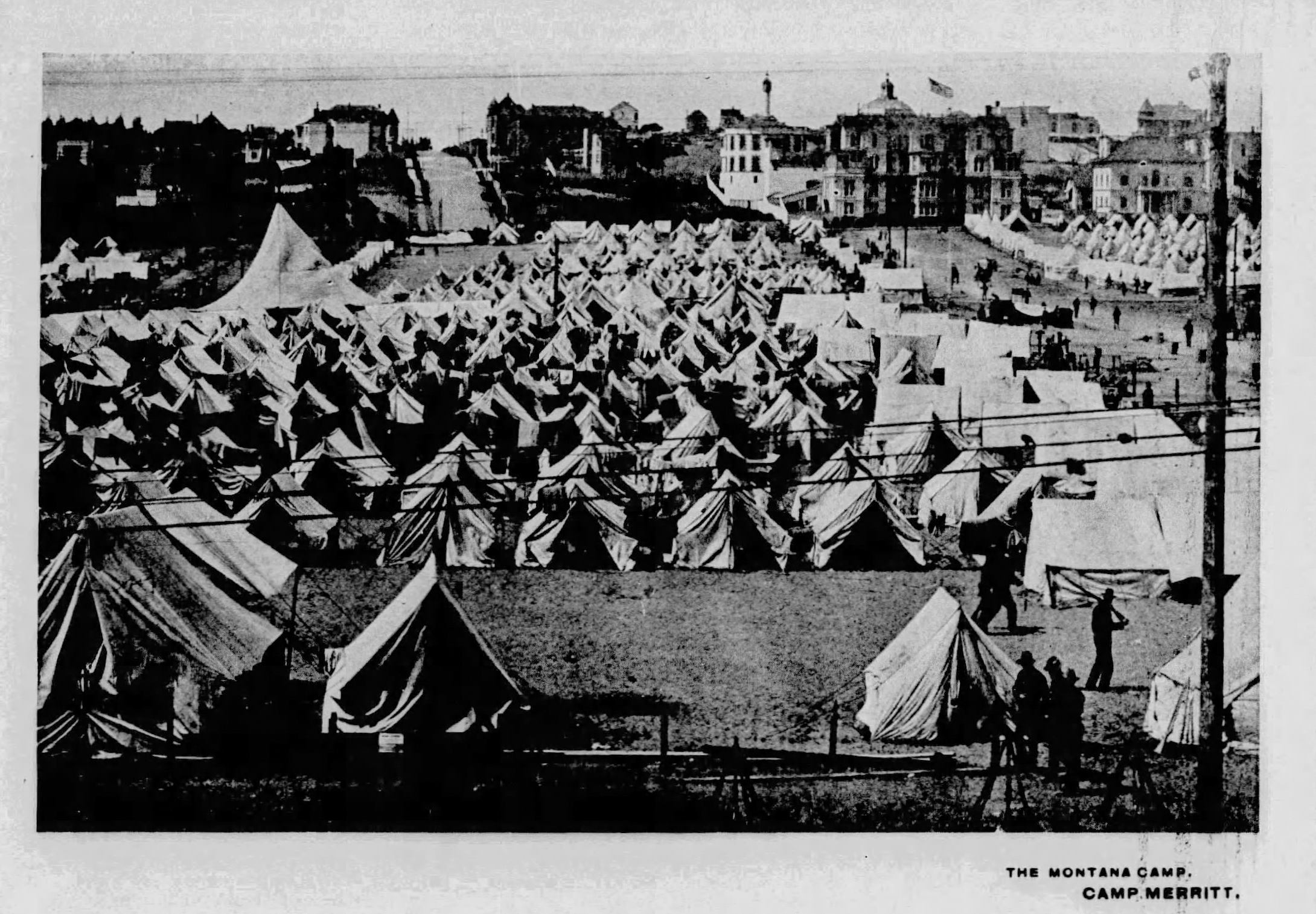
1st Montana Volunteer Infantry Stationed at Camp Merritt, 1898

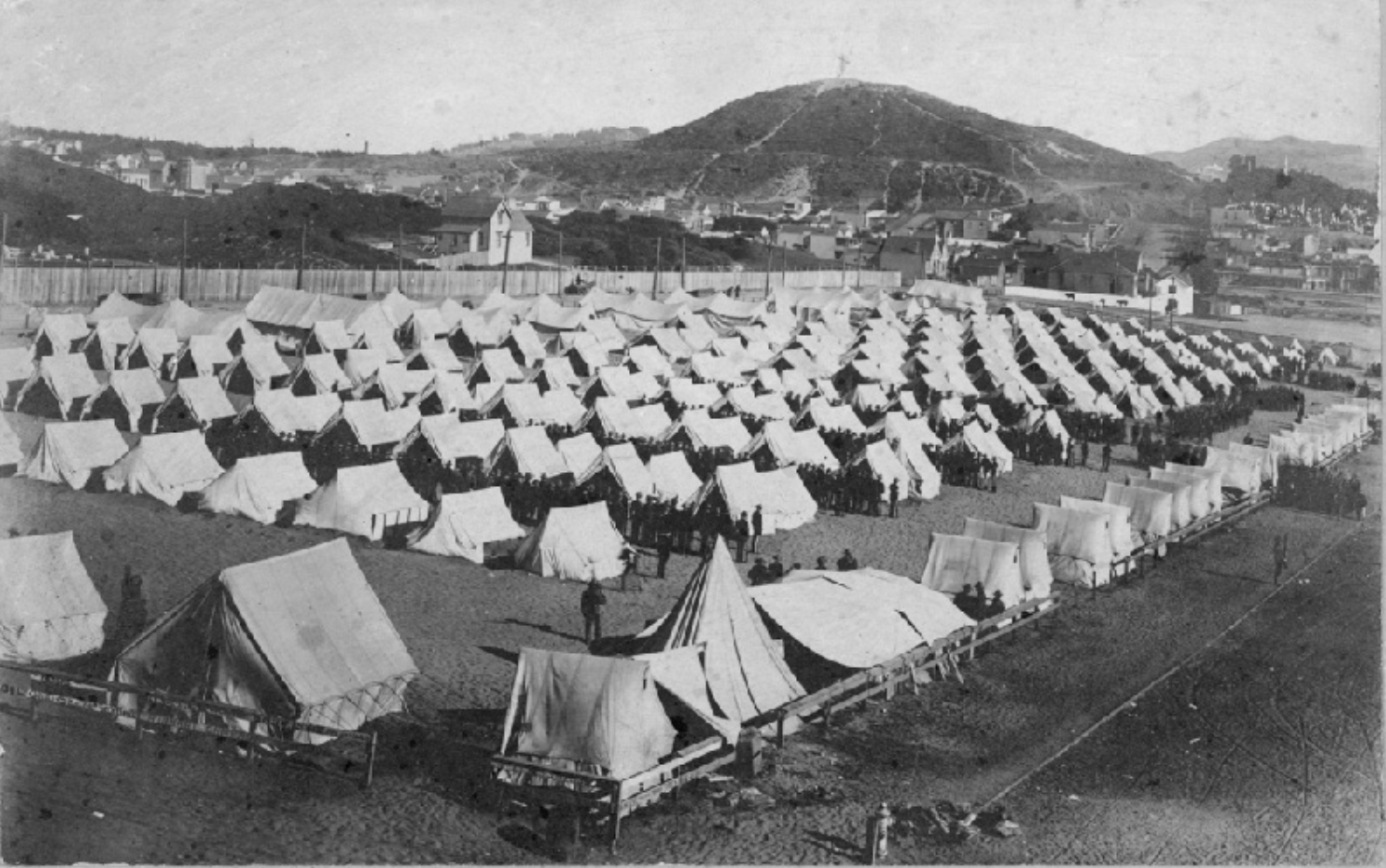
51st Iowa Volunteer encampment, Camp Merritt, 1898; with view of Lone Mountain Cemetery

Camp Merritt was established on May 29, 1898, pursuant to General Order 7 of the U.S. Expeditionary Forces. General Elwell Stephen Otis, commanding general of the U.S. Volunteer Army, established the headquarters for the Philippine Islands Expeditionary Forces at the southwest corner of the camp on slightly elevated ground at Fulton Street and 4th Avenue.

== Units processed through Camp Merritt ==
Confirmed Units processed through Camp Merritt:

- 1st Nebraska Volunteer Infantry (Col. John P. Bratt commanding) (May 19, 1898 – June 15, 1898)
- 10th Pennsylvania Volunteer Infantry (Col. A. L. Hawkins commanding) (May 25, 1898 – June 14, 1898 (departed for Philippines as part of Second Expeditionary Force))
- 18th U.S. Infantry, 1st Battalion (Col. C. M. Bailey commanding) (May 29, 1898 – June 14, 1898 (departed for Philippines as part of Second Expeditionary Force))
- 13th Minnesota Volunteer Infantry (? – June 26, 1898)
- 20th Kansas Volunteer Infantry (May 20, 1898 – August 5, 1898 (transferred to Camp Michigan))
- 1st Colorado Volunteer Infantry (Col. Irving Hale)
- Utah Volunteer Artillery, Light Battery A (Capt. R. W. Young)
- Utah Volunteer Artillery, Light Battery B (Capt. F. A. Grant)
- 1st Tennessee Volunteer Infantry (Col. William Crawford Smith commanding) (Arrived June 1898 and quickly moved to Camp Merriam)
- 1st Montana Volunteer Infantry (Col. Harry C. Kessler commanding) (Arrived May 28, 1898 - Departed on USS Pennsylvania 19 July 1898)

== Decommissioning ==
The camp was abandoned about August 27, 1898 when the remaining troops were moved to Camps Merriam and Miller a bit north at Presidio of San Francisco. Camp Merritt existed only long enough for the fleet to be assembled for the 18,000 troops destined for the Philippines to be sent off. Problems with disease, mostly measles and typhoid, also accelerated its closing.
