= Arthur Barrett Donnelly =

American business executive and U.S. Army general

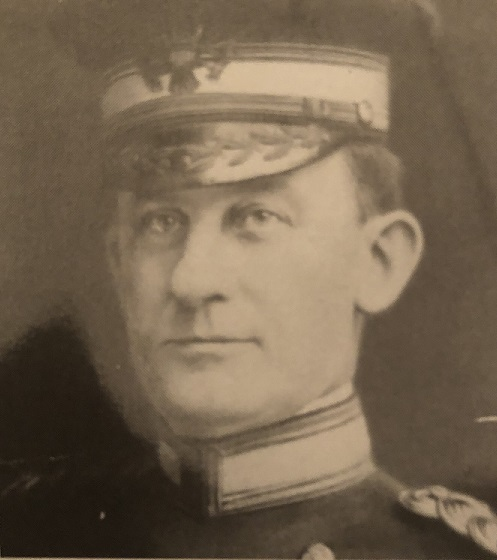
- Missouri national Guard photo, circa 1917
- Born: May 31, 1875; St. Louis, Missouri
- Died: July 29, 1919 (aged 44); Blue Ridge Summit, Pennsylvania
- Burial place: Calvary Cemetery and Mausoleum, St. Louis, Missouri
- Spouse: Anna Pike Renick
- Children: 3
- Military career
- Allegiance: United States
- Branch: United States Army
- Service years: 1892–1919
- Rank: Brigadier general
- Unit: Missouri National Guard
- Commands: Company F, 1st Missouri Infantry Regiment; 1st Missouri Infantry Regiment; Missouri National Guard; 69th Infantry Brigade
- Conflicts: Spanish–American War; Pancho Villa Expedition; World War I
- Other work: Manufacturing company owner and operator

Arthur Barrett Donnelly (May 31, 1875 – July 29, 1919) was a United States Army officer in the late 19th and early 20th centuries.

== Biography ==
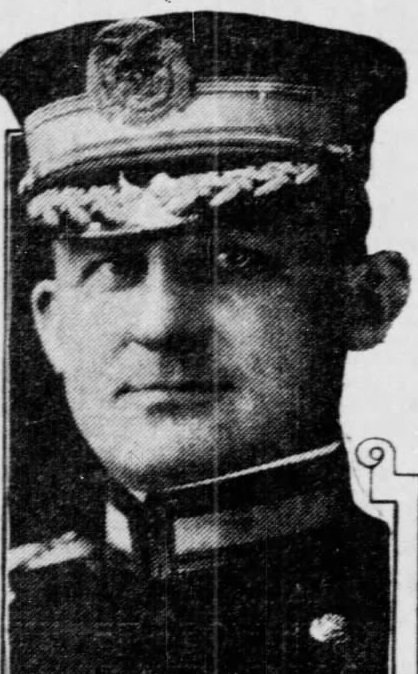
Donnelly as depicted in the New St. Louis Star, April 10, 1914

Donnelly was born in St. Louis on May 31, 1875. On December 7, 1892, he enlisted in the 1st Missouri Infantry Regiment. By the Spanish–American War, Donnelly commanded his company, and by the time he participated in the Pancho Villa Expedition in 1916, he commanded his regiment. On January 8, 1917, he was promoted to Adjutant General of the Missouri National Guard, holding the rank of brigadier general. On March 25, 1917, Missouri's governor gave Donnelly an indefinite leave of absence to assume command of the 1st Missouri Infantry. After his appointment as a brigadier general on August 5, 1917, he commanded the 69th Infantry Brigade at what is now Fort Sill.

In addition to his service in the military, Donnelly worked at the Hamilton-Brown Shoe Company from 1901 to 1906 as a factory department manager, and from 1906 to 1908 as an assistant factory superintendent and buyer. He later served as president of the leather goods producer Arthur B. Donnelly and Company, as well as the Interstate Mercantile Company and Missouri Paint Varnish Company.

In April 1918, Donnelly was accused of conduct unbecoming an officer for drinking, gambling, and allowing officers under his command to do so. Rather than face court-martial, he resigned his brigadier general's appointment and applied for a commission at a lower rank. Donnelly was commissioned as a major and assigned to duty with the 11th Infantry Division's 71st Infantry Regiment at Fort George G. Meade, Maryland.

While conducting a post-war East Coast sightseeing tour, Donnelly was killed in an automobile accident near Blue Ridge Summit, Pennsylvania on July 29, 1919. The crash injured his wife, daughter, two sons and other passengers. Donnelly was interred at Calvary Cemetery and Mausoleum in St. Louis.

== Personal life ==
Donnelly married Anna Pike Renick on May 10, 1898. He was a member of the Catholic Church as well as a Republican.

== Bibliography ==
- Davis, Henry Blaine Jr. (1998). Generals in Khaki. Raleigh, North Carolina: Pentland Press. ISBN 1571970886. OCLC 40298151.
- Marquis Who's Who (1975). Who Was Who In American History – The Military. Chicago, Illinois: Marquis Who's Who. ISBN 0837932017.
