= 3666th Support Maintenance Company =

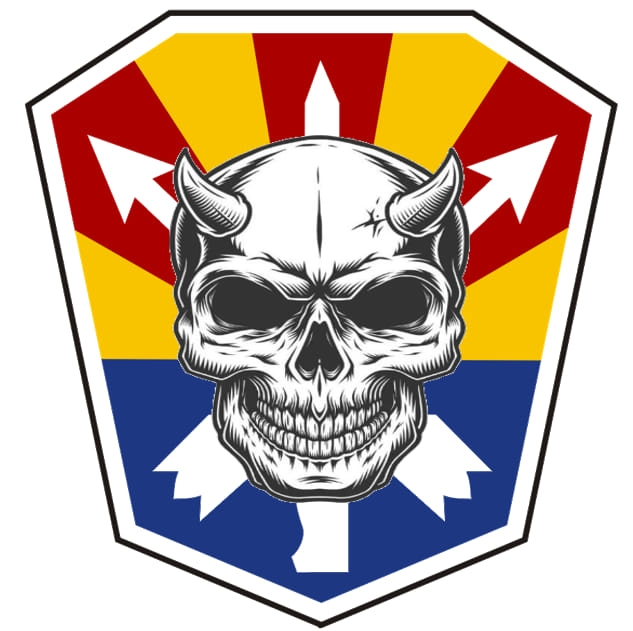
- Company Insignia
- Active: 1948 – Present
- Country: United States of America
- Allegiance: Arizona
- Branch: Army National Guard
- Type: Maintenance Company
- Role: Force Sustainment
- Part of: 158th Combat Sustainment Support Battalion
- Garrison/HQ: Petty Crew Armory
- Nickname: Desert Demons
- Motto: "Unleash Hell"
- Mascots: Desert Demon and Corporal Deadpool

Commanders
- Current commander: CPT Jonathon Gonzales
- Current First Sergeant: PENDING

Insignia
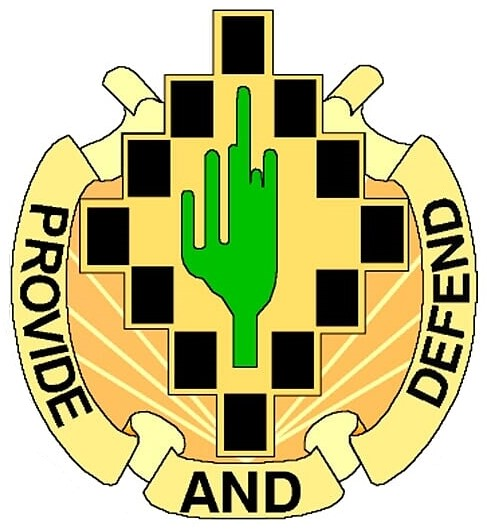
- Distinctive unit insignia

3666th Support Maintenance Company (3666th SMC) "Desert Demons" is a maintenance and support company that is task organized to provide maintenance support operations to battalion level or higher elements including special operations. The 3666th SMC is currently stationed at Petty Crew Armory, Papago Park Military Reservation, Arizona, and is a subordinate unit of the 158th Combat Sustainment Support Battalion, 198th Regional Support Group, Arizona Army National Guard.

== Capabilities ==
A support maintenance company can be employed at echelons above division (EAD), within a corps area of operations and/or in the division support area (DSA) to support corps units operating in the DSA and also provide support to divisional units in automotive/ armament, ground support, and electronic equipment maintenance as well as track vehicle recovery when required.

== History ==
- 1953 organized as the 3666th Light Maintenance Company in Phoenix, Arizona.
- 1955 organized as the 3666th Ordnance Company (FM) in Phoenix, Arizona, Captain Lester L. McCartney commanding.
- 1956-1959 organized as the 3666th Ordnance Company (DS) in Phoenix, Arizona, Captain Wilber T. Joplin commanding.
- 1961-1962 organized as the 3666th Ordnance Company (Dir. Spt.) in Phoenix, Arizona, Captain Wilber T. Joplin commanding.
- 1964 organized as the 3666th Light Maintenance Company in Phoenix, Arizona.
- May 2020 - June 2020, 3666th SMC prepares for mobilization under Operation Spartan Shield at Florence Military Reservation.
- June 2020 - July 2020, 3666th is assigned to 120th Infantry Brigade at Fort Hood (North), Texas for mobilization under Operation Spartan Shield.
- July 2020 3666th SMC conducts Transfer of Authority from 626th Support Maintenance Company, North Carolina Army National Guard, Camp Buehring, Kuwait.
- March 2021, 3666th SMC conducts Transfer of Authority to the 3654th Support Maintenance Company, Iowa Army National Guard, Camp Buehring, Kuwait.
- February 2022, 3666th SMC conducts Change of Command with outgoing commander Captain Juan C. Poland transferring command to Captain Jonathon Gonzales.

=== Short Creek Raid 1953 ===
3666th Light Maintenance Company, July - August 1953

In the early-morning hours of Sunday July 26, 1953, several hundred Arizona state officials and police officers moved into the Mormon community of Short Creek, to serve warrants on thirty-six men and eighty-six women. Officials staging the raid believed they were rescuing the community's children from a life of bondage and immorality. Shortly the raid, ordered by Governor Howard Pyle, resulted in the arrest of all adult members of the community, except five, on “conspiracy” charges, which include polygamy. The members of the raiding party included highway patrolmen, liquor control officers, sheriff's deputies and special deputies. The Arizona Attorney General, Ross F. Jones, told the media that the state would seek levying of fines which would act as liens against United Effort Plan properties in Short Creek. This action, he said would “abolish for once and ‘for all” this polygamist community in Mohave County. He indicated that he would also seek a writ to “abate the nuisance” of polygamist practices at Short Creek. This raid was the third on the Mormon community in Short Creek, the two previous ones being in 1935 and 1944, which also dealt with disruption of the community and the separation of the families.

The Arizona National Guard was activated to provide communications and field kitchen support for the raid and to aid members of the town.

Support detachment command team

- Captain Frank E. Schaffer, Jr., Company E, 158th Infantry
- Chief Warrant Officer 2 Neal E. Wagoner, Company E, 158th Infantry
- Master Sergeant Reuben M. Wise, Heavy Mortar Company, 158th Infantry

Field kitchen team - Company I, 158th Infantry

- Master Sergeant Henry L. Schaeffer
- Sergeant Frank Martinez
- Sergeant Robert P. Morison
- Corporal Guillermo Ceballos
- Private First Class Edward Goitia
- Private Richard C. Flores
- Private Albert B. Casados

Communications

- Corporal Jerry F. DeWitt, 3666th LMC, Phoenix, set up and operated a communications center for the news media. News stories from Short Creek were filed direct from the center by trunk line service at Sky Harbor in Phoenix, Arizona.

=== Exercise Desert Strike 1964 ===
3666th Light Maintenance Company, 8 May 1964 - 30 May 1964

Desert Strike was a field training exercise (FTX) in which two Joint Task Forces (JTF) opposed each other. The Exercise involved some 90,000 Army, Navy, Air Force and Marine personnel of the United States Strike Command. They maneuvered in the desert area of Southern California-Arizona. This was the largest exercise in the United States in 1964 and the first major exercise in this area since World War II. The Arizona National Guard coined the title of the exercise as "Colorado River War II". The exercise was a hypothetical situation, with two principal countries established, "Calonia" on the West of the Colorado River and "Nezona" on the East. With the Colorado as the international border between the two major powers, the border between the two countries extends from Mexico through the maneuver area to Las Vegas, Nevada, and from there north to another hypothetical neutral country.

During the exercise the 3666th LMC was attached to the 705th Maintenance Battalion, 5th Infantry Division (Mechanized), Lieutenant Colonel Patrick J. Breen commanding.

The exercise was so large that the Arizona National Guard borrowed equipment and vehicles from the California National Guard, Utah National Guard, Oklahoma National Guard, Colorado National Guard, New Mexico National Guard, Texas National Guard, and the Arkansas National Guard.

=== Gulf War 1990-1991 ===
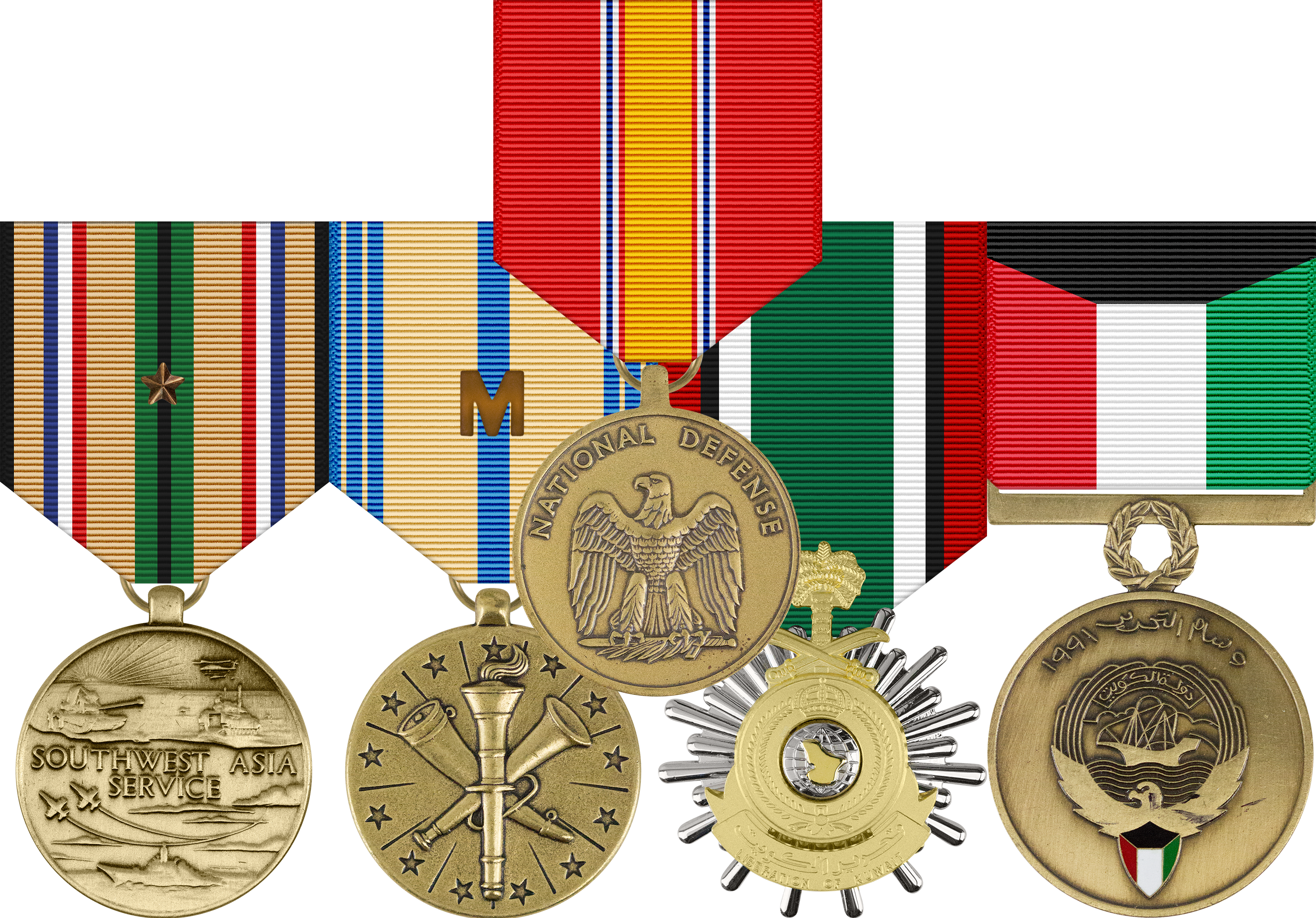
Medals awarded to Arizona National Guard for service in the Gulf War 1990-1991

Arizona Army National Guard units that were activated for the Gulf War.

- 222nd Transportation Company
- 259th Engineer Company
- 356th Signal Company
- 363rd Ordnance Detachment
- 416th Aviation Platoon
- 855th Military Police Company
- 1404th Transportation Company
- 2220th Transportation Company
- 2221st Quartermaster Company
- 2222nd Transportation Company

The 3666th Support Maintenance Company was not activated for Operation Desert Shield or Operation Desert Storm.

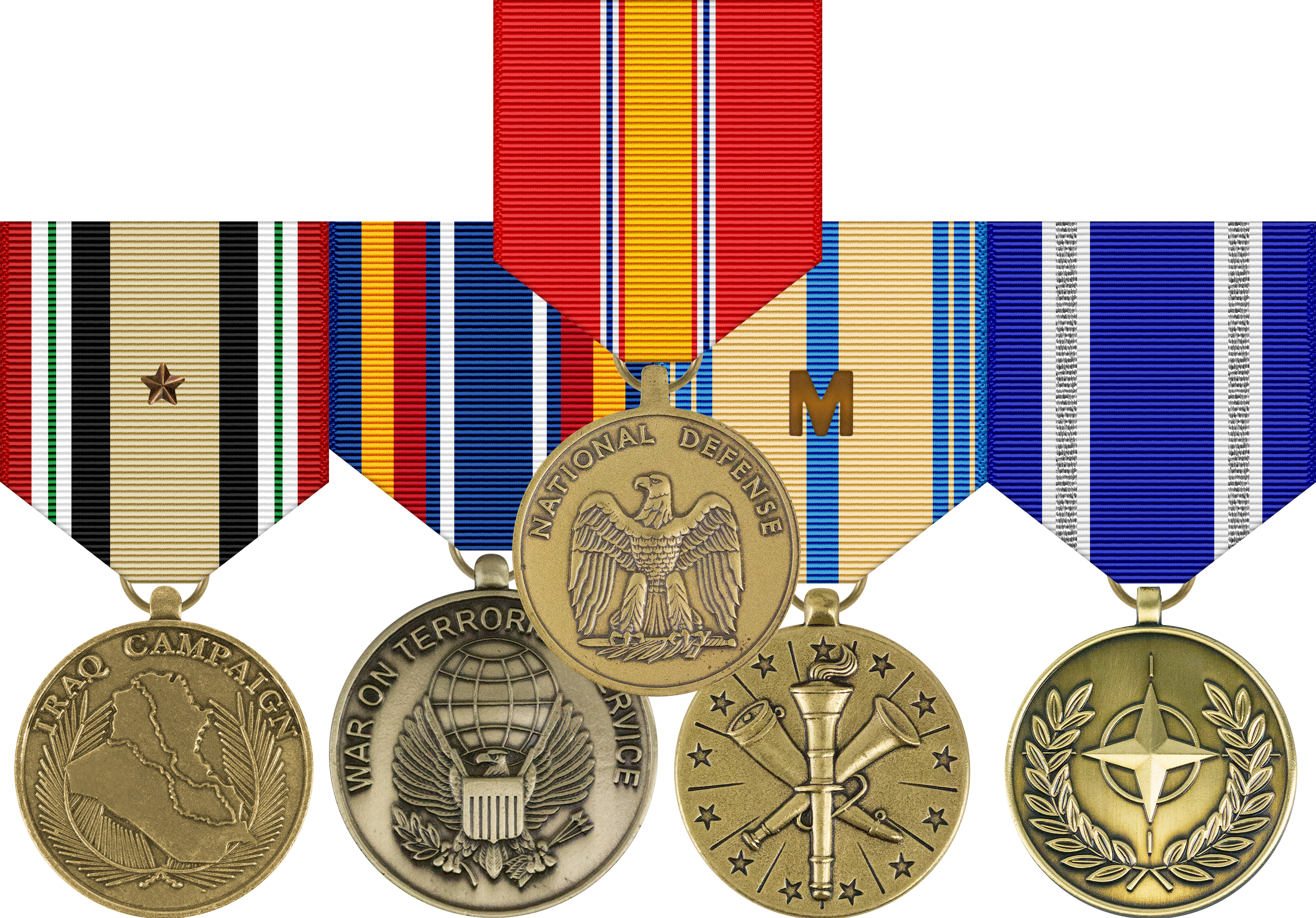
Medals awarded to 3666th SMC for Operation Iraqi Freedom 2009-2010

=== Operation Iraqi Freedom, Phase VI 2009-2010 ===
3666th Support Maintenance Company, September 2009 - April 2010:

Deployed to Iraq in support of Operation Iraqi Freedom (Iraqi Sovereignty).

3666th Support Maintenance Company Command Team during deployment:

- Company Commander: Captain Clark
- Company First Sergeant: First Sergeant Richardson

=== Annual training 2015 ===
3666th Support Maintenance Company, September 2015

Provide maintenance support operations at Camp Dodge, Iowa - Joint Maneuver Training Center.

=== Annual training 2016 ===
3666th Support Maintenance Company, Sustain the Force, June 2016 - July 2016

Supporting the Alaska National Guard in sustainment and combined support maintenance operations at Fort Greely and Joint Base Elmendorf Richardson.

=== Exercise Cougar Conqueror / Exercise Western Defender 2016 ===
3666th Support Maintenance Company - August 2016

3666th SMC Soldiers attended a training exercise with the 158th Combat Sustainment Support Battalion at Canadian Forces Base Wainwright in a U.S. Army, National Guard, and Canadian Army joint exercise to improve interoperability with the United States Army's primary reserve combat force and its Canadian allies.

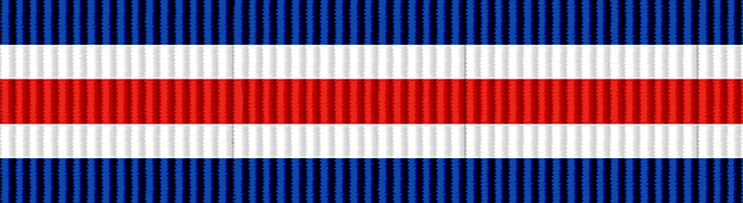
Army Reserve Component Overseas Training Ribbon

National Guard Soldiers who attended the training exercise in Canada are authorized the Army Reserve Components Overseas Training Ribbon (ARCOTR).

=== Annual training 2017 ===
3666th Support Maintenance Company, 11 March 2017 - 25 March 2017

Trained at the U.S. Army Tank-automotive and Armaments Command Life Cycle Management Command, Fleet Management Expansion, which supports the U.S. Army Training and Doctrine Command by maintaining equipment such as combat systems, tactical vehicles and weapons used to train Soldiers at TRADOC schools. Fort Benning, Georgia - Maneuver Center of Excellence.

=== Operation Guardian Support 2018 - 2020 ===
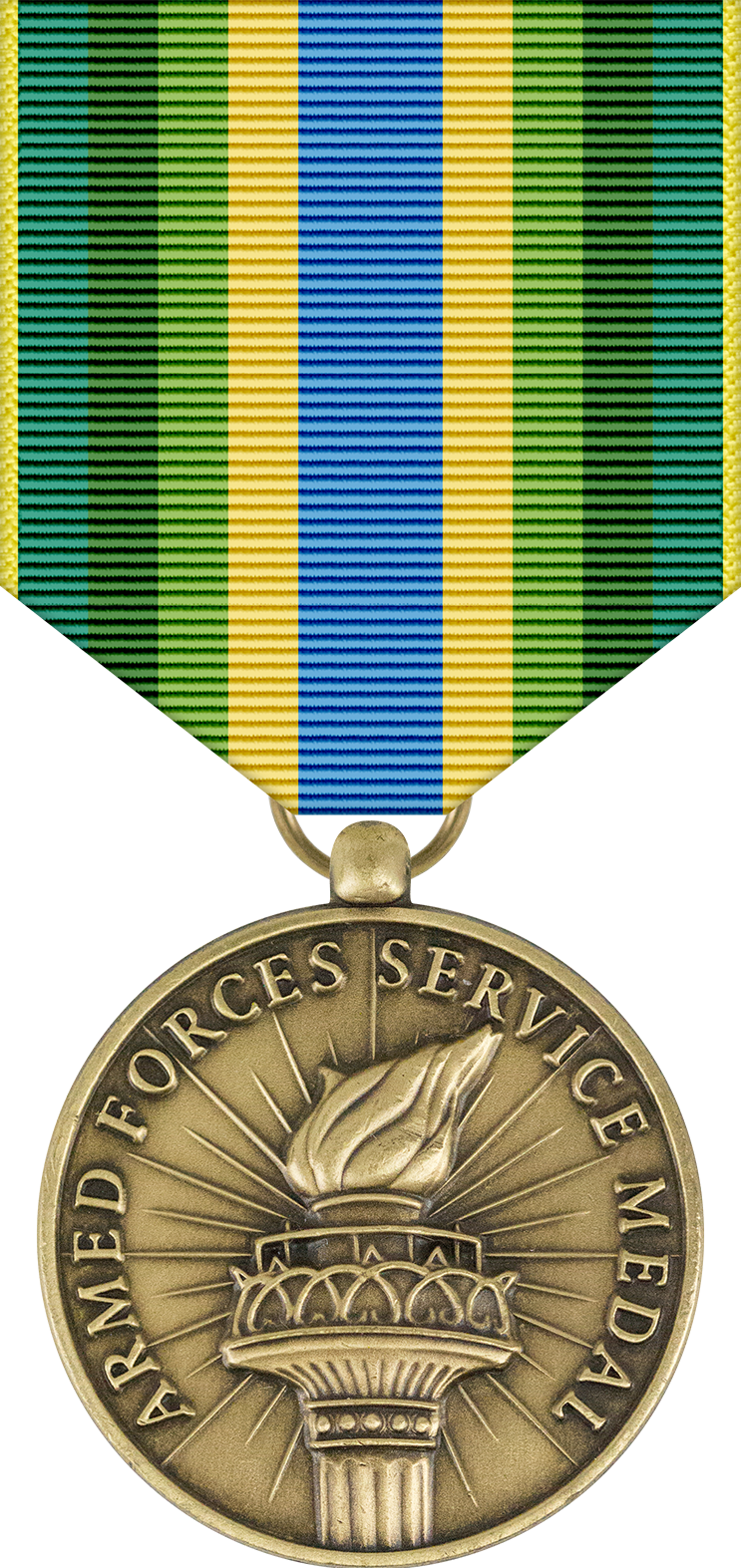
Armed Forces Service Medal

Due to an ongoing migrant crisis at the U.S.-Mexico Border the President of the United States, Donald J. Trump, ordered Operation Guardian Support into effect to have States voluntarily activate their respective Army National Guard and Air National Guard units to conduct a domestic deployment to the border to provide relief to local law enforcement and United States Customs and Border Protection.

3666th Support Maintenance Company Soldiers along with other members of the Arizona National Guard were activated in support of this mission.

Operation Guardian Support was the named National Guard mission, it was later reinforced with Operation Faithful Patriot which augmented the Guard presence at the border with Active Duty Service Members.

Those who served on Operation Guardian Support were authorized the Armed Forces Service Medal.

State National Guards that were activated in support of Operation Guardian Support:

- Alabama National Guard
- Arizona National Guard
- Florida National Guard
- Georgia National Guard
- Mississippi National Guard
- Missouri National Guard
- South Carolina National Guard
- Texas National Guard
- Virginia National Guard

=== National Training Center 2019 ===
3666th Support Maintenance Company, NTC Rotation 08-19 - August 2019 at Fort Irwin, California

Hypothetical Training Event - United States Army and allied "Atropian" armed forces vs "Donovian" armed forces.

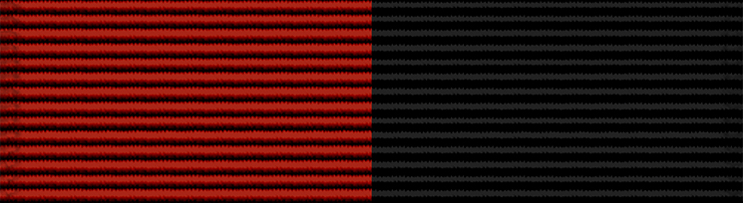
Arizona State Active Duty Ribbon

3666th SMC provided support to its battalion element the 158th Combat Sustainment Support Battalion "Coati" and the 116th Cavalry Brigade Combat Team, Idaho Army National Guard and their subordinate units.

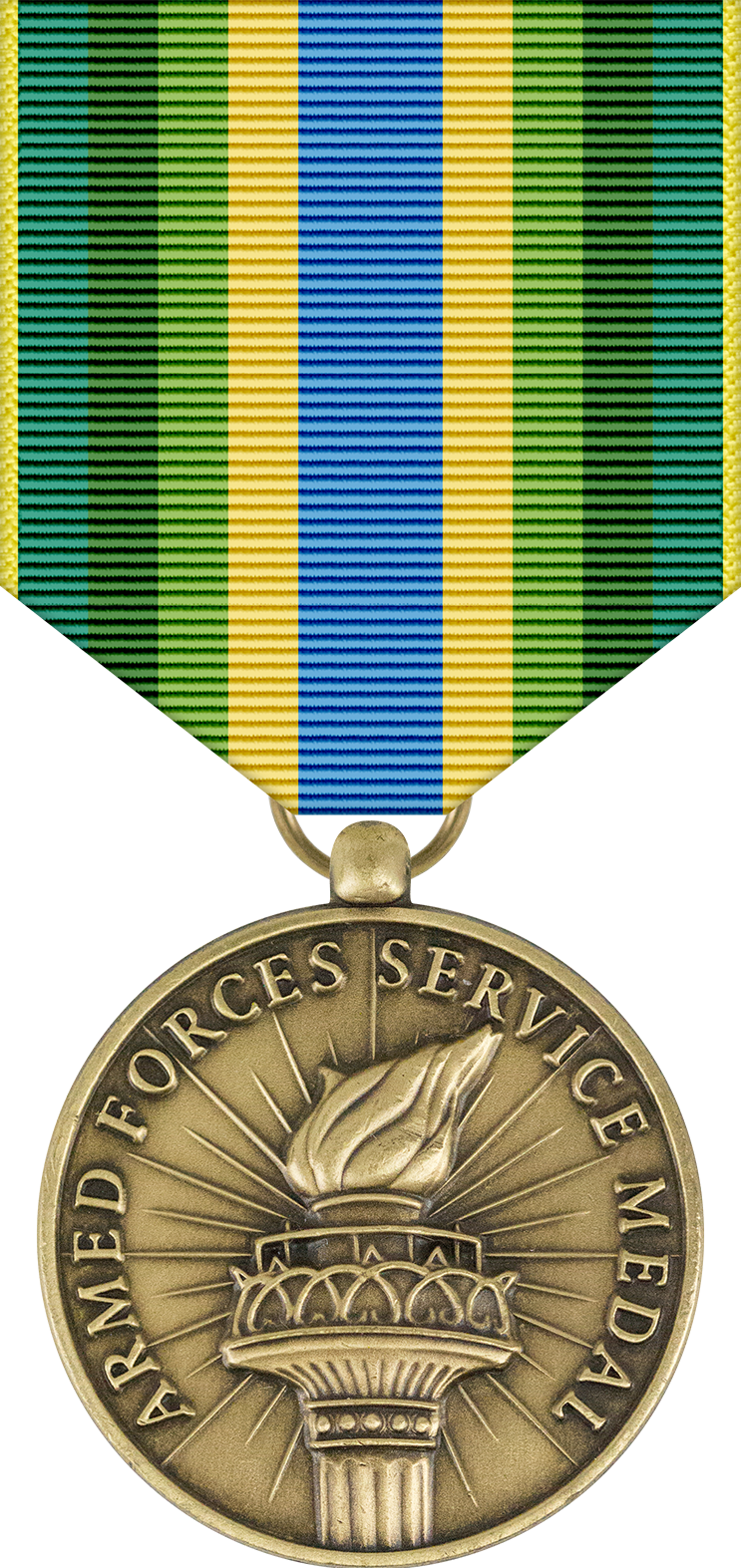
Armed Forces Service Medal

=== COVID-19 Pandemic 2020 ===
3666th Support Maintenance Company, March 2020 - May 2020

26 Soldiers of the 3666th SMC were activated under emergency State Active Duty (SAD) orders and under Title 32 (T32) orders by the Governor of Arizona, Doug A. Ducey Jr., to support the State of Arizona's response to the COVID-19 pandemic under Task Force Logistics, Joint Task Force - Arizona. Task Force Logistics was operated by the 158th Combat Sustainment Support Battalion (158th CSSB) and commanded by Lieutenant Colonel Nathaniel T. Panka, Joint Task Force - Arizona was commanded by Brigadier General John E. Hoefert. 3666th SMC Soldiers received a letter of appreciation from BG Hoefert, the Arizona State Active Duty Ribbon, and the Armed Forces Service Medal for their efforts during the COVID-19 Pandemic.

=== Operation Spartan Shield 2020-2021 ===
3666th Support Maintenance Company, July 2020 - March 2021

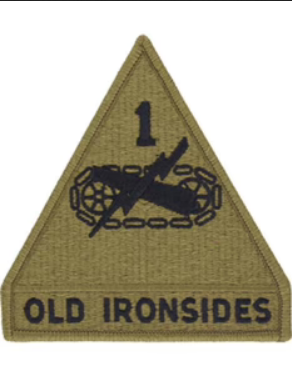
1st Armored Division SSI "Combat Patch" OCP

Deployed to Kuwait in support of Operation Enduring Freedom (Spartan Shield) from July 2020 - March 2021. The unit preceded the arrival of the 142nd Combat Sustainment Support Battalion by one month and temporarily fell under the 87th Combat Sustainment Support Battalion and preceded the 101st Airborne Division Sustainment Brigade (Air Assault) by two months and so fell under the 304th Sustainment Brigade, United States Army Reserve until the transfer of authority was complete.

Prior to deployment the 3666th SMC attended pre-mobilization training at the Florence Military Reservation dubbed "Forward Operating Base Mesa" from May 2020 - June 2020. From June 2020 - July 2020 the 3666th SMC completed their pre-mobilization training at Fort Hood, Texas under the 120th Infantry Brigade until finally mobilizing to Kuwait where they would primarily operate out of Camp Buehring and have some forces in Camp Arifjan, Ali Al Salem Air Base, Kuwaiti Naval Base (KNB), and the Kingdom of Saudi Arabia (KSA).

3666th SMC Soldiers were awarded 7* Meritorious Service Medals (MSM), 58* Army Commendation Medals (ARCOM), 65* Army Achievement Medals (AAM), 100* Army Good Conduct Medals (AGCM), 133* Global War on Terrorism Expeditionary Medals (GWOTEM), 133* Global War on Terrorism Service Medals (GWOTSM), and 133* Armed Forces Reserve Medals (AFRM) with "M" Devices, 10* Certificates of Achievement, and various Certificates of Appreciation and Challenge Coins by the end of their tour.

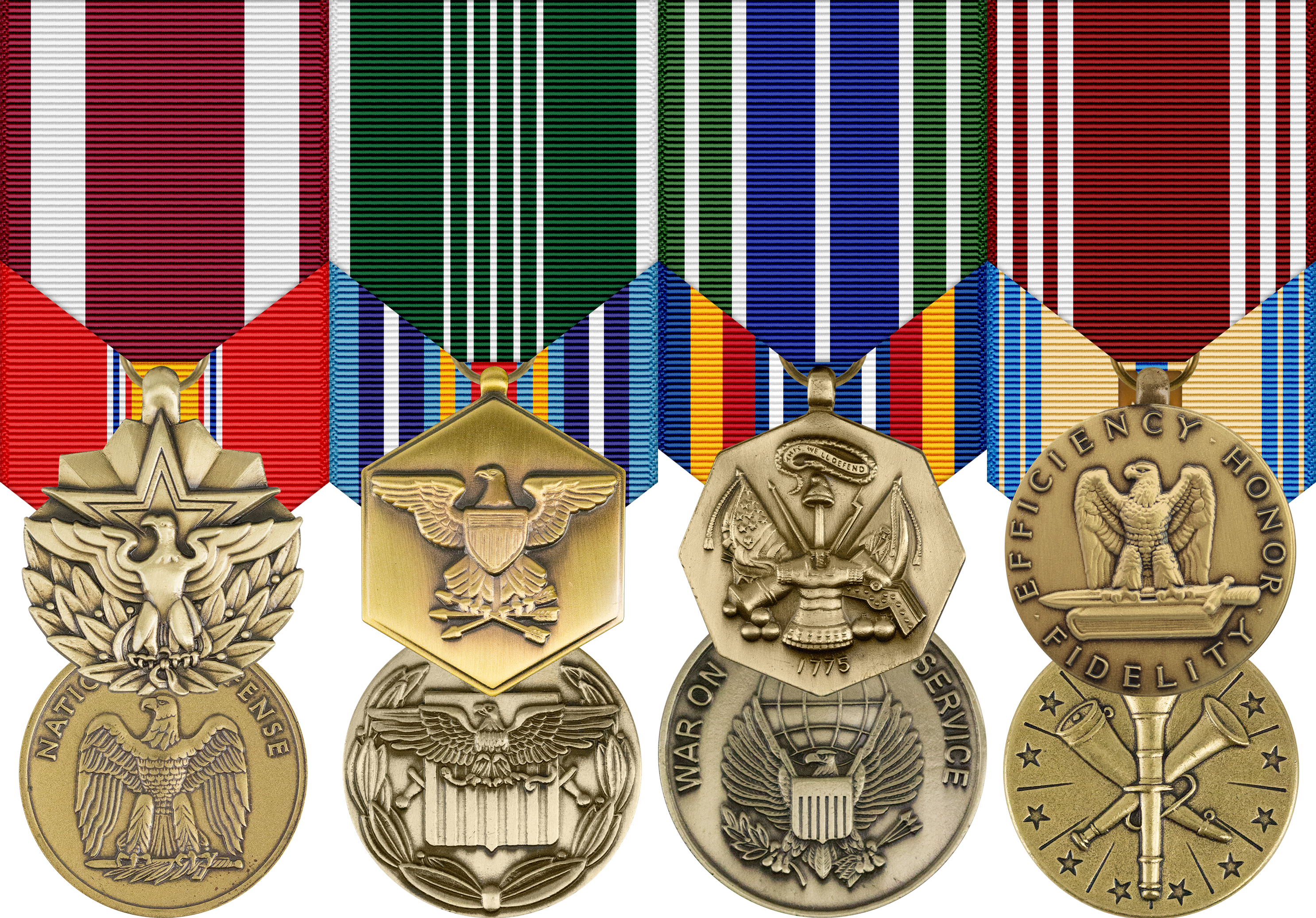
Medals awarded to 3666th SMC for Operation Spartan Shield.

3666th SMC Soldiers who went forward to Saudi Arabia were authorized wear of the 1st Armored Division Combat Patch for service with the 142nd Combat Sustainment Support Battalion, 1st Armored Division Sustainment Brigade.

3666th Support Maintenance Company Command Team during deployment:

- Company Commander: Captain Juan C. Poland
- Company Executive Officer: First Lieutenant Justin Ayers
- Company First Sergeant: First Sergeant Jeffery L. Hough

The 3666th Support Maintenance Company was in Kuwait and Saudi Arabia during the 30th Anniversary of Operation Desert Shield and Operation Desert Storm for the Gulf War (1990 - 1991).

Brigadier General Joseph R. Baldwin, Land Component Commander, Arizona Army National Guard informed the Soldiers of the 3666th SMC that they were the first Arizona National Guard unit to ever train and deploy under pandemic conditions.

=== Garrison 2021 ===
After Operation Spartan Shield (2020-2021) the 3666th Support Maintenance Company departed Kuwait and returned to Fort Hood, Texas for demobilization where they were greeted by their brigade element commander Colonel Christopher S. Sandison, 198th Regional Support Group, Arizona Army National Guard.

After demobilization the 3666th SMC departed Fort Hood for the Goldwater Air National Guard Base, Arizona where they were greeted by Major General Michael T. McGuire, The Adjutant General, Arizona National Guard who then released them from their deployment to their friends and families.

After the Yellow Ribbon period the 3666th SMC returned to regular National Guard drilling status under the 158th Combat Sustainment Support Battalion, 198th Regional Support Group, Arizona Army National Guard at the Petty Crew Armory, Papago Park Military Reservation, Arizona.

=== Border Crisis 2021 - 2022 ===
Due to increased migrant traffic on the U.S.-Mexico Border the Arizona National Guard was activated by the Governor of Arizona, Doug A. Ducey Jr. who declared a State of Emergency to reinforce Arizona's Southern Border with Mexico by providing support to local law enforcement and Customs and Border Protection Agents.

Under the leadership of the newly appointed Adjutant General (TAG) Brigadier General Kerry L. Muehlenbeck, 250 Soldiers and Airmen of the Arizona National Guard will assist with medical operations at detention facilities, install and maintain security cameras on the border, monitor and collect information from cameras, and analyze satellite imagery in known smuggling corridors for drug running and human trafficking.

The mission began in April 2021 and was authorized $2,536,500 was authorized by the Arizona State Emergency Council to find the Arizona National Guard mission along with another $200,000 to fund search and rescue operations in coordination with the Sheriff's Departments.

The mission was extended by one year in August 2021 by order of the Governor for Fiscal Year 2022 and authorized $25,000,000 passed by the Arizona State Legislature. At this time there were 150 Guardsmen with the Arizona National Guard activated for the mission who had since added logistics and administrative support to their duties assisting law enforcement.

In August 2022 the governor followed with Executive Order 2022-04 - Securing Arizona's Southern Border, in which he ordered the Arizona Department of Emergency Management to close gaps in the Border Wall and other infrastructure on the Arizona-Mexico Border to prevent illegal crossing, drug running, and human trafficking. In the executive order the governor continued to authorized at the direction of the Adjutant General (TAG) Major General Kerry L. Muehlenbeck the deployment of the Arizona National Guard on Arizona-Mexico Border to continue their mission.

3666th SMC Soldiers were activated for this mission.

End date of the mission is to a date to be determined.

=== Task Force Badge 2021 - 2022 ===
Due to staffing shortages at multiple Arizona law enforcement agencies and increased migrant concerns at the U.S.-Mexico Border the Arizona National Guard was activated by the Governor of Arizona, Doug A. Ducey Jr. to provide manpower and support to the affected agencies. Some 3666th SMC Soldiers were placed on orders for this mission.

Departments that were assisted include but are not limited to the Cochise County Sheriff's Office, Maricopa County Sheriff's Office, Pinal County Sheriff's Office, and the Yuma County Sheriff's Office and other law enforcement agencies.

Arizona National Guard Soldiers and Airmen provided administrative, maintenance, and medical support to include COVID-19 support to law enforcement agencies but did not engage in law enforcement operations with the goal to alleviate staff shortages so that law enforcement officers such as sheriff's deputies and detention officers can focus on their primary roles.

Task Force Badge Command Team

- Commander: Major Frederick T. Fell

End date of the mission is to a date to be determined.

== Honors ==
=== Unit awards and decorations ===
Ribbon	Award	Period of Award	PO	Date
	Meritorious Unit Commendation	4 September 2009 to 30 June 2010	004-08	4 January 2011
	Meritorious Unit Commendation	July 2020 to March 2021, recommended by 142nd CSSB and forwarded to 101st DSB	Pending HRC	Pending HRC

== Campaign, war service, and unit award streamers ==
Conflict	Campaign Name	Year(s)	Streamer
Operation Iraqi Freedom	Iraqi Sovereignty	4 September 2009 to 30 June 2010	
Operation Enduring Freedom	Spartan Shield	July 2020 - March 2021	

Unit Award	Campaign Name	Year(s)	Streamer
Meritorious Unit Commendation	Iraqi Sovereignty	4 September 2009 to 30 June 2010	
U.S. Army Safety in Excellence	Spartan Shield	March 2020 - March 2021	

== Shoulder sleeve insignia ==
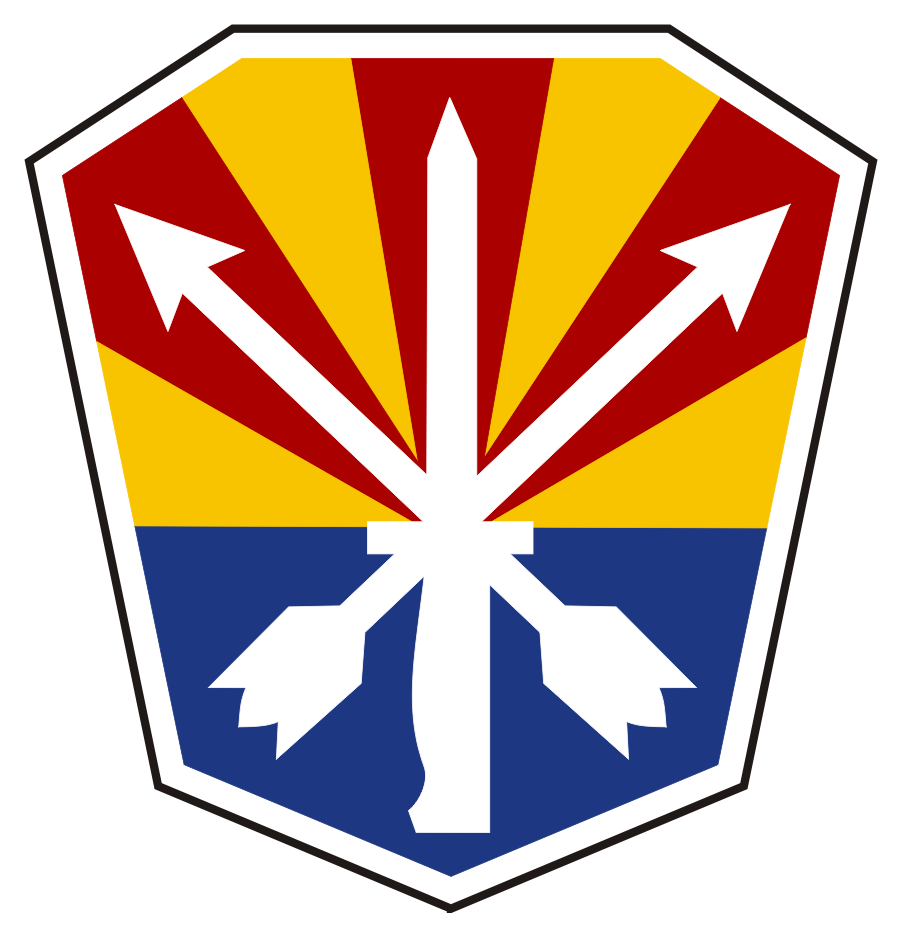
Shoulder Sleeve Insignia, Arizona Army National Guard

=== Description/blazon ===
On a seven sided shield depicting the Arizona State Flag in the background with a white bayonet representing the willingness to fight and crossed white arrows a Native American symbol of peace.

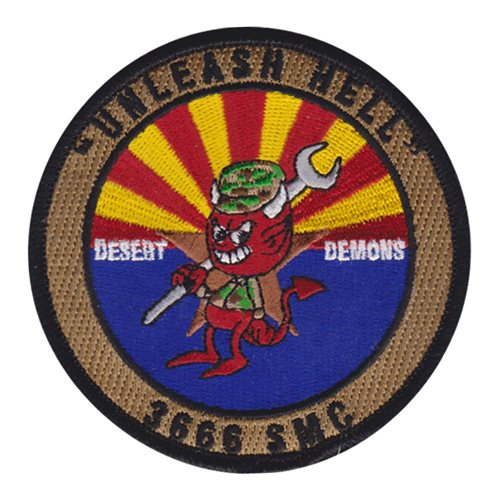
Morale Patch designed during deployment in support of OEF-SS (2020-2021) by SPC Gonzalez.

Background

Pending history

=== Morale patch ===
Designed during the 3666th Support Maintenance Company deployment to Kuwait in support of Operation Spartan Shield (2020-2021) by SPC Gonzalez. It is not authorized for wear on official U.S. Army uniforms but has been used by Soldiers unofficially on personal gear to show their pride in the unit.

== Fallen soldiers remembered ==
- W.E. (Winn) Hendricks, 3666th Support Maintenance Company, Arizona Army National Guard, Served 1948-1954, Born 9 May 1928, Died 17 December 2020.

== Units served with ==
2022 Garrison - Petty Crew Armory

- 158th Combat Sustainment Support Battalion "Wildcats"
- Headquarters and Headquarters Company, 158th CSSB
- 363rd Explosive Ordnance Disposal Company
- Company A, 422nd Expeditionary Signal Battalion (Nevada Army National Guard)
- 160th Finance Management Support Detachment
- 193rd Quartermaster Platoon

2021 Garrison - Petty Crew Armory

- 158th Combat Sustainment Support Battalion "Wildcats"
- Headquarters and Headquarters Company, 158th CSSB
- 363rd Explosive Ordnance Disposal Company
- 996th Area Support Medical Company
- Company A, 422nd Expeditionary Signal Company (Nevada Army National Guard)
- 159th Finance Management Support Detachment
- 160th Finance Management Support Detachment

2020 - 2021 Kuwait, Operation Spartan Shield, July 2020 – March 2021

- United States Army Central
- 1st Theater Sustainment Command
- 311th Expeditionary Sustainment Command (United States Army Reserve)
- 310th Expeditionary Sustainment Command (United States Army Reserve)
- 101st Airborne Division Sustainment Brigade (Air Assault)
- 304th Sustainment Brigade (United States Army Reserve)
- 541st Combat Sustainment Support Battalion, 1st Infantry Division Sustainment Brigade
- 142nd Combat Sustainment Support Battalion, 1st Armored Division Sustainment Brigade
- Headquarters and Headquarters Company, 142nd CSSB (HHC)
- 87th Combat Sustainment Support Battalion, 3rd Infantry Division Sustainment Brigade
- 47th Heavy Composite Truck Company
- 154th Heavy Composite Truck Company
- 236th Inland Cargo Transfer Company
- 203rd Inland Cargo Transfer Company (United States Army Reserve)
- 1487th Transportation Company (Ohio Army National Guard)
- 720th Transportation Company (New Mexico Army National Guard)
- 227th Composite Supply Company
- 247th Composite Supply Company
- 3654th Support Maintenance Company (Iowa Army National Guard)
- 592nd Ordnance Company (United States Army Reserve)
- 163rd Ordnance Company (United States Army Reserve)
- 151st Quartermaster Detachment (Rigger)

2019 NTC

- 116th Cavalry Brigade Combat Team, Idaho Army National Guard
- 158th Combat Sustainment Support Battalion "Coati"
- Headquarters and Headquarters Company, 158th CSSB
- 1404th Transportation Company, 1120th Transportation Battalion

2016 Canada Exercise Cougar Conqueror | Exercise Western Defender August 2016

- 158th Combat Sustainment Support Battalion "Wildcats"
- Headquarters and Headquarters Company, 158th CSSB
- 123rd Mobile Public Affairs Detachment
- 66th Military Police Company
- 3rd Canadian Division
- 41st Canadian Brigade Group
- 39th Canadian Brigade Group
- 39th Canadian Service Battalion

2016 Alaska Sustain the Force June 2016

- Alaska Army National Guard

2009 - 2010 Iraq Operation Iraqi Freedom September 2009 - April 2010

- 541st Combat Sustainment Support Battalion, 1st Infantry Division Sustainment Brigade
- Headquarters and Headquarters Company, 541st CSSB
- 498th Transportation Company
- 1483rd Transportation Company
- 263rd Quartermaster Company

== Company commanders ==
- CPT Jaime North, 2015
- MAJ Adam G. Marvin, 2018 - 2020
- CPT Juan C. Poland, 2020 - February 2022
- CPT Jonathon Gonzales, February 2022 – 2024
- CPT Roberto Jaramillo, 2024–Present

== First sergeants ==
- First Sergeant Eleuterio A. Garcia, 2017 - 2020
- First Sergeant Jeffery L. Hough, 2020 - 2022
- First Sergeant Max J. Flores, 2022–Present

== Unit artwork ==
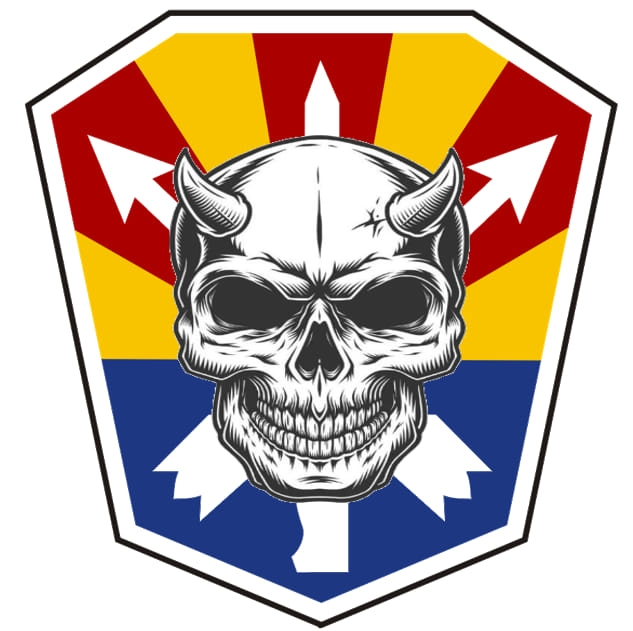
Current unit logo created by SSG Fulton, SGT Tyler, and SPC Benjamin.

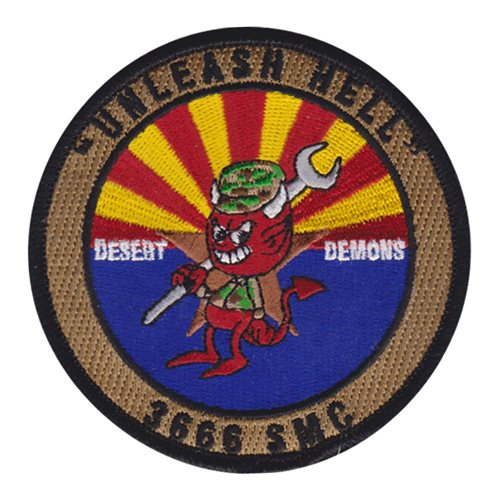
Current morale patch created by SPC Gonzalez.
