= Division Sustainment Support Battalion =

== Composition of a US Army Division Sustainment Support Battalion (DSSB) ==
The DSSB is organic to a Division Sustainment Brigade (DSB). The DSSB and its subordinate units move and displace to maintain pace with the DSB and division headquarters. The DSSB commands and controls all organic, assigned, and attached units and conducts support operations in the Division area of operations(AO). As directed by the DSB commander, the DSSB performs maintenance, transportation, supply, and distribution.

DSSBs have the following organic units permanently assigned

- Composite supply company
- Composite truck company
- Support maintenance company.

Other capabilities are task organized by the division commander based on support requirements. The DSSB synchronizes and executes logistics support to BCTs and multifunctional support brigades attached to the division and non-divisional units operating in the division AO. The Division Sustainment Support Battalion is employed using various task-organizations as shown in figure below. The Division Sustainment Support Battalion is a renamed combat sustainmentDivision Sustainment Support Battalion. It is organic to division sustainment support brigades assigned to divisions. The Division Sustainment Support Battalion and its subordinate units must be able to move and displace at the pace of large-scale combat operations. The Division Sustainment Support Battalion commands and controls all organic, assigned, and attached units. As directed by the division support brigade commander. Division Sustainment Support Battalions organic to division sustainment brigades supporting divisions have an organic composite supply company, composite truck company, and support maintenance company. Other capabilities are task organized by the division commander in accordance with requirements. The Division Sustainment Support Battalion synchronizes and executes logistics support to BCTs and multifunctional support brigades attached to the division.

Division Sustainment Support Battalion conducts:

- Maintenance
- Transportation
- Supply
- Field services
- Distribution

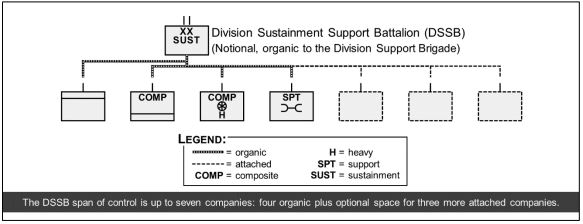

Current Active Duty DSSB's see also: Sustainment Brigades in the United States Army

Unit Patch	Unit Crest	Battalion	Type	Supported Division	Location	Component
		129th Division Sustainment Support Battalion	(Heavy)	101st Airborne Division	Fort Campbell, KY	Active Duty
		142nd Division Sustainment Support Battalion	(Heavy)	1st Armored Division	Fort Bliss, TX	Active Duty
		189th Division Sustainment Support Battalion	(Heavy)	82nd Airborne Division	Fort Bragg, NC	Active Duty
		194th Division Sustainment Support Battalion	(Heavy)	2nd Infantry Division	Camp Humphreys, KO	Active Duty
		524th Division Sustainment Support Battalion	(Heavy)	25th Infantry Division	Schofield Barracks, HI	Active Duty
		541st Division Sustainment Support Battalion	(Heavy)	1st Infantry Division	Fort Riley, KS	Active Duty
		548th Division Sustainment Support Battalion	(Heavy)	10th Mountain Division	Fort Drum, NY	Active Duty
		553rd Division Sustainment Support Battalion	(Heavy)	1st Cavalry Division	Fort Cavazos, TX	Active Duty
		68th Division Sustainment Support Battalion	(Heavy)	4th Infantry Division	Fort Carson, CO	Active Duty
		87th Division Sustainment Support Battalion	(Heavy)	3rd Infantry Division	Fort Stewart, GA	Active Duty
		728th Division Sustainment Support Battalion	(Heavy)	28th Infantry Division	Fort Indiantown Gap, PA	Army NG
		529th Division Sustainment Support Battalion	(Light)	29th Infantry Division	Fort Belvoir, VA	Army NG
		1347th Division Sustainment Support Battalion	(Heavy)	34th Infantry Division	Bloomington, MN	Army NG
		169th Division Sustainment Support Battalion	(Light)	35th Infantry Division	Olathe, KS	Army NG
		372nd Division Sustainment Support Battalion	(Heavy)	36th Infantry Division	Dallas, TX	Army NG
		519th Division Sustainment Support Battalion	(Light)	38th Infantry Division	Terre Haute, IN	Army NG
		746th Division Sustainment Support Battalion	(Light)	40th Infantry Division	Van Nuys, CA	Army NG
		119th Division Sustainment Support Battalion	(Light)	42nd Infantry Division	Vineland, NJ	Army NG

== See also ==
- Reorganization plan of United States Army
- Coats of arms of U.S.Division Sustainment Support Battalions
- FM 3-90.5 Combined Arms Battalion APR 2008
- FM 3-90.6 Brigade Combat Team SEP 2010
- ATP 4-90 BrigadeDivision Sustainment Support Battalion APR 2014
- ATP 4-93 Sustainment Brigade AUG 2013
- ATP 4-94 Theater Sustainment Command JUN 2013
- FM 4-95 Logistics Operations APR 2014
