= 3rd Sustainment Brigade =

3rd Infantry Division Sustainment Brigade
- 3rd Infantry Division shoulder sleeve insignia, worn by the brigade
- Active: 1 July 1957 – present
- Country: United States of America
- Branch: United States Army
- Type: Sustainment Brigade
- Role: Sustainment
- Size: Brigade
- Part of: 3rd Infantry Division
- Garrison/HQ: Fort Stewart, Georgia
- Motto: "Heart of the Rock"
- Decorations: Presidential Unit Citation

Insignia
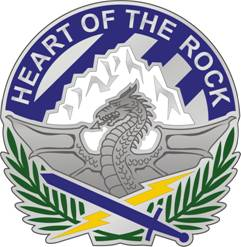
- Distinctive unit insignia

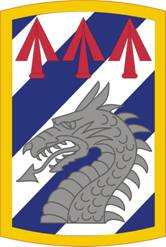
- Former shoulder sleeve insignia

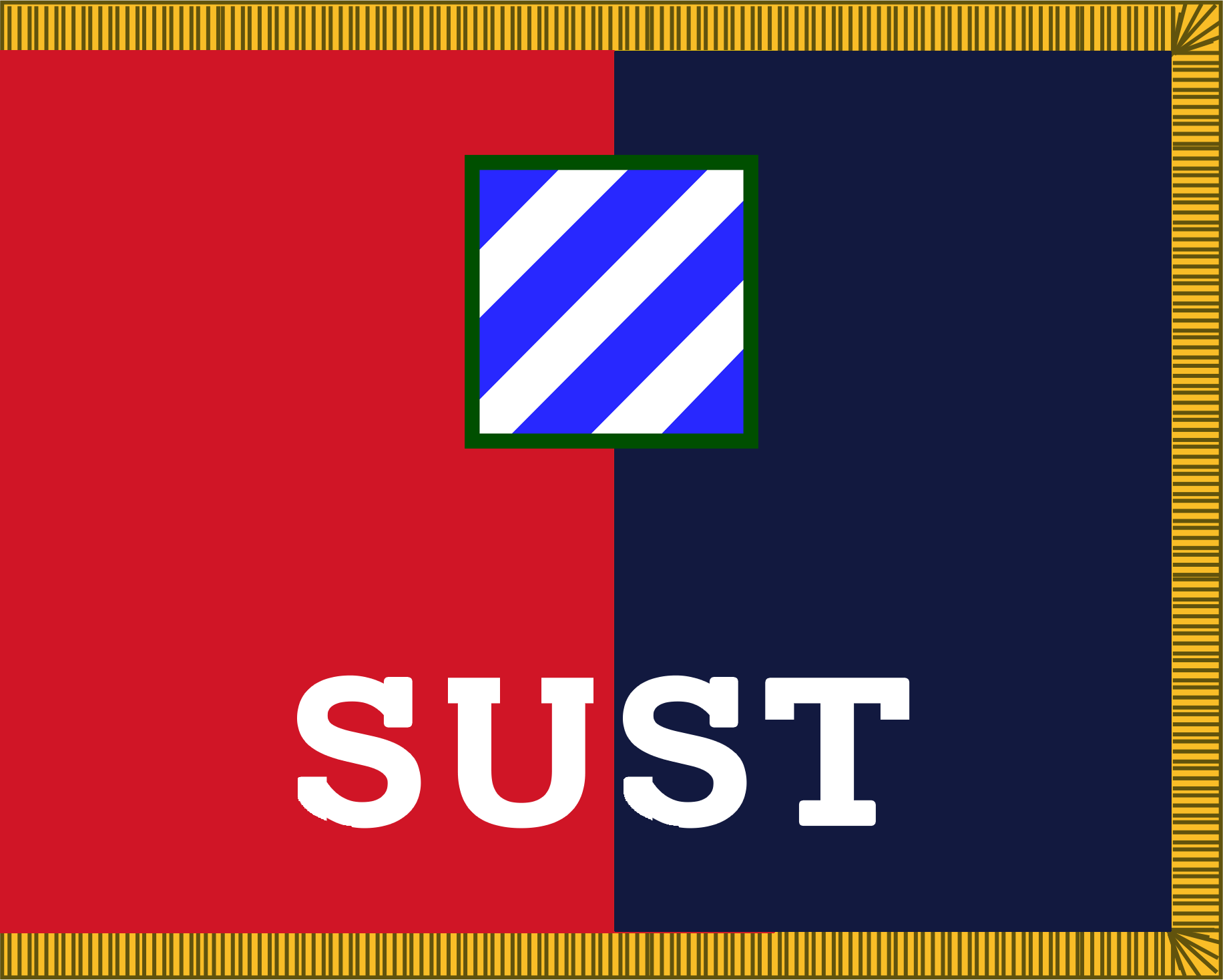
- 3rd Division Sustainment Brigade Flag

The 3rd Infantry Division Sustainment Brigade is a sustainment brigade of the United States Army headquartered at Fort Stewart, Georgia. The 3rd Division Sustainment Brigade (3DSB) is responsible for providing logistical support to the 3rd Infantry Division, however the modular nature of the brigade means that it takes on other roles while deployed.

Though its lineage dates back to 1957, the unit was not designated as a separate unit until 2005. The 3rd Division Sustainment Brigade has served three tours in Iraq in support of Operation Iraqi Freedom, its first tour being the initial invasion and securing of the country, followed by a second tour of duty as logistics support for units around Baghdad, and finally as the multinational division supply lines in the northern division of the country.

It has since deployed to several other locations throughout the Middle East and to Europe.

== Organization ==
The 3rd Division Sustainment Brigade has a permanent organization of two attached battalions, however this number can be changed when the unit is deployed in a theater of operations. These permanent attachments include the 87th Division Sustainment Support Battalion (87th DSSB), (formerly known as the 87th Combat Sustainment Support Battalion, CSSB) and a Division Sustainment Troops Battalion (DSTB) (formerly known as the Division Special Troops Battalion). Each battalion, like the brigade itself, is also designed to have more or less companies depending on need in a theater of operations.

The units are headquartered at Fort Stewart, Georgia.

=== Permanent Units ===
- Division Sustainment Troops Battalion (DSTB)
  - HHC (Headquarters and Headquarters Company)
  - 414th Signal Company
  - 90th Human Resources Company
  - 24th Finance Company (deactivated)
  - 274th Movement Control Team (deactivated)
  - 287th Field Feeding Company
- 87th Division Sustainment Support Battalion (87th DSSB)
  - HHD (Headquarters and Headquarters Detachment)
  - Alpha Company
  - Bravo Company
  - Charlie Company
  - 135th Quartermaster Company
  - 24th Ordnance Company

== History ==
The unit was constituted 1 July 1957 in the regular army as Headquarters and Headquarters Detachment, 3rd Infantry Division Trains, and activated at Fort Benning, Georgia. On 20 March 1963, the unit was consolidated with the 3rd Infantry Division Band, which has previously been organized in 1943 as the band, 3rd Infantry Division. On 15 March 1968, the unit was re-organized and re-designed as Headquarters and Headquarters Company and Band, 3rd Infantry Division Support Command.

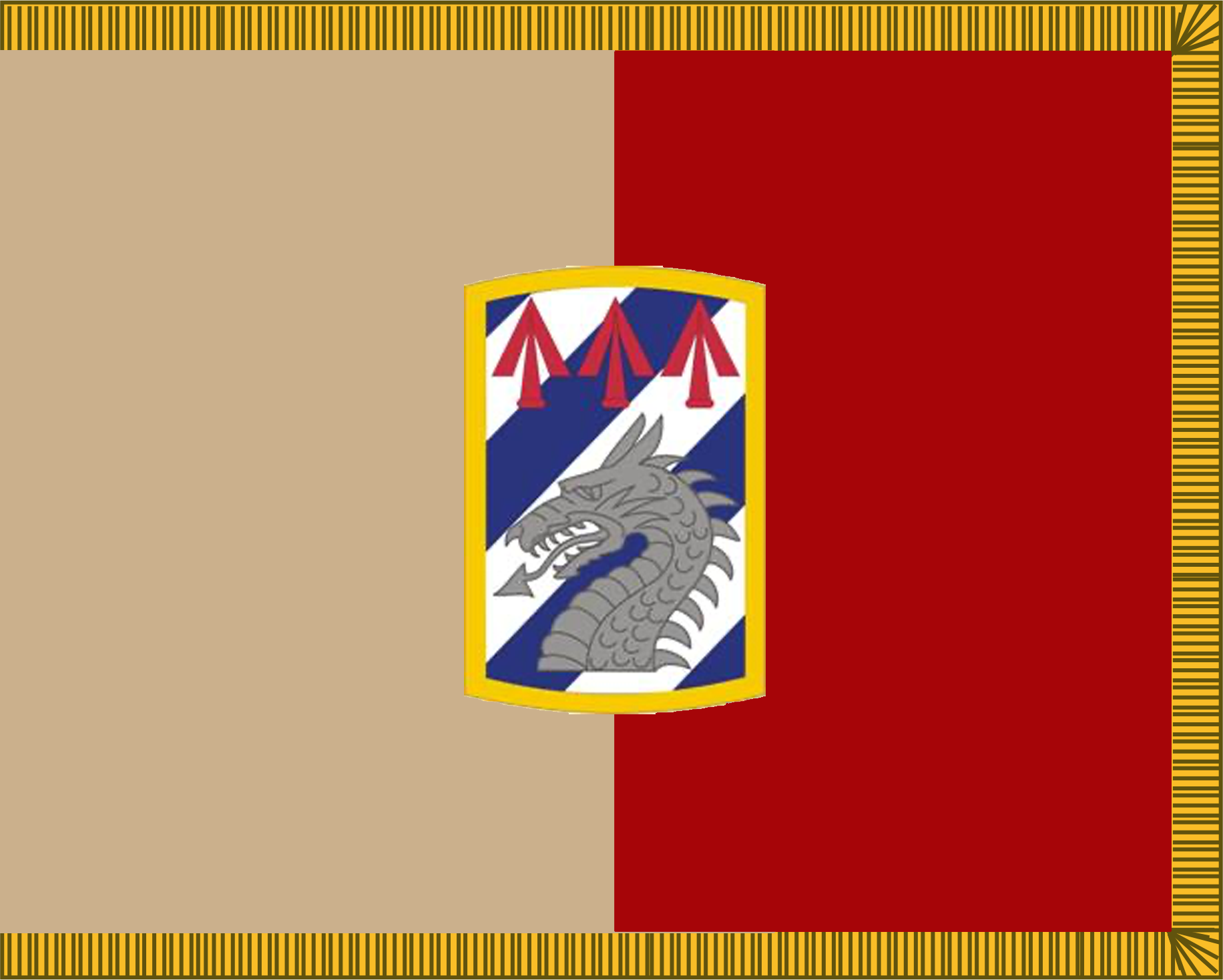
3rd Sustainment Brigade Flag

On 21 May 1972, the unit was re-organized and re-designed as Headquarters and Headquarters Company, 3rd Infantry Division Support Command. It was deployed to as part of the Cold War buildup, should hostilities arise in the region with the Soviet Union. Though the unit was placed on alert constantly, it never saw action during its time in the region, which lasted from its activation until 1991.

In 2021, the 3rd Sustainment Brigade was renamed as the 3rd Division Sustainment Brigade (DSB) in order to realign with new Army sustainment doctrine and unit designations.

== Deployments ==
Like other Division Sustainment Brigades, it is more common for the unit to deploy in companies as needed in theaters of operations. This is by design. The deployments listed here are where the vast majority of the brigade was deployed to support that theater.

=== Operation Iraqi Freedom ===
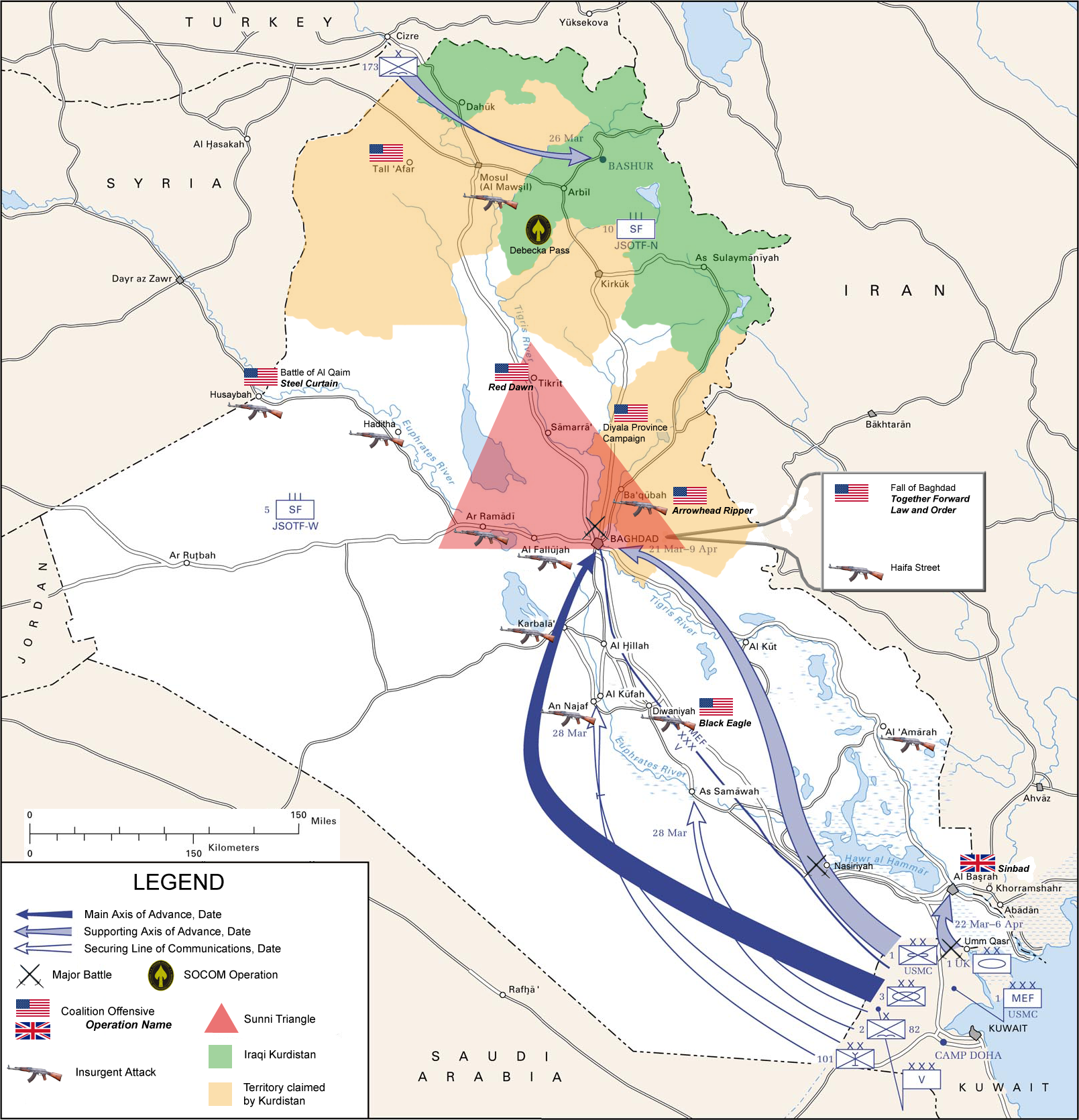
Battle plan for the Iraq War, with the 3rd SB supporting the 3rd Infantry Division's attack in the southern region of the country.

In the fall of 2002, the Division Support Command deployed in support of Operation Iraqi Freedom I, earning the Presidential Unit Citation along with the rest of the 3rd Infantry Division. The Brigade and its division had spearheaded the invasion into the nation of Iraq, supporting the four brigades as they pushed through southern Iraq and into the capital of Baghdad. After the initial invasion and capture of Baghdad, the brigade remained in the city, supporting the 3rd Infantry Division as the unit conducted counterinsurgency and infrastructure activities in the area. It returned home to Fort Stewart in August 2003.

The Division Support Command was renamed the Division Support Brigade and deployed to Iraq in the fall of 2004 in support of Operation Iraqi Freedom III, leading coalition troops in control of the Baghdad area. Under Multinational Division, Baghdad. It returned home again in January 2006. The Division Support Brigade was reorganized as the 3rd Support Brigade on 15 June 2005, and re-designated as the 3rd Sustainment Brigade on 21 April 2006.

In 2007, the Brigade saw its third deployment to Iraq during the Iraq War, relieving the 45th Sustainment Brigade of its areas of responsibility of Multinational Division, North, comprising over a dozen Forward Operating Bases. The Brigade deployed to Iraq in fall of 2007 following the Brigade Combat Teams and aviation brigade of the 3rd Infantry Division, however, for this deployment, the unit did not support the Division directly, as its mission in Multinational Division, North covered facilities management, not unit logistics. Brigade projects focused on building infrastructure throughout northern Iraq. The brigade served a total of 15 months in the country, headquartered at Contingency Operating Base Q-West in Northern Iraq under the command of the 316th Expeditionary Support Command. It was relieved during a change of command ceremony on 9 August 2008, at which time it returned to Fort Stewart. It was replaced by the 16th Sustainment Brigade. Since its return, the brigade participated in an intramural soccer tournament at Fort Benning, something many of its members enjoyed doing, even while deployed.

=== Operation Enduring Freedom ===
In late November 2012, the brigade deployed to Afghanistan in support of Operation Enduring Freedom in Afghanistan.

=== Operation Resolute Support ===
In October 2017, the brigade and Special Troops Battalion headquarters deployed to Bagram Airfield, Afghanistan, to support Operation Resolute Support, taking on the role of the 3rd Infantry Division Resolute Support Sustainment Brigade. During their 9-month tour they oversaw all logistics operations inside Afghanistan. Between the 2012 and 2017 Afghanistan deployments, the brigade was responsible for facilitating the closure of 61 forward operating bases.

=== Operation Spartan Shield, Operation Inherent Resolve, Operation Freedom Sentinel, and Operation Allies Refuge ===
In September 2014, the brigade deployed to Camp Arifjan, Kuwait, to support sustainment and retrograde operations in seven middle eastern countries.

In June 2021, the brigade returned on deployment to Camp Arifjan, Kuwait, in support of Operation Spartan Shield, Operation Inherent Resolve, Operation Freedom Sentinel, and Operation Allies Refuge. The brigade served as the Theater Sustainment Brigade and was integral to the closure of Operation Freedom Sentinel, facilitating the retrograde of equipment into Kuwait and onward movement for transfer and divestment.

The brigade deployed a tactical command post to Camp As Saliyah, Qatar, and rapidly built capacity at a closing base to receive, safeguard, house, and onward move evacuees from Afghanistan in support of Operation Allies Refuge, the United States’ single largest humanitarian airlift in history. The brigade played a vital role in moving personnel and equipment into Hamid Karzai International Airport to sustain the airlift, ultimately providing the professional reverence and repatriation of thirteen fallen service members through Kuwait to their loved ones in the U.S.

As part of the 2021 deployment, the brigade, in a test of the Trans Arabian Network and interoperability with partners in the Kingdom of Saudi Arabia, completed the first ever military convoy from one side of Saudi Arabia to the other and into Kuwait, further bolstering ties with allies in the critical region.

In March 2023, the brigade deployed again to the Middle East, providing similar support to various operations.

=== Operation European Assure, Deter, and Reinforce ===
In March 2022, the brigade deployed its Bravo Company, 87th Division Sustainment Support Battalion with 130 service members to provide additional logistics support to units deployed in Europe in response to the Russian invasion of Ukraine, along with providing support to Ukrainian forces through material and equipment deliveries. It is considered a historic, no-notice deployment to the other side of the world in which Soldiers operated in the Netherlands, Belgium, Germany, Italy, and Poland. It later became known as Operation European Assure, Deter, and Reinforce.

== Honors ==
=== Unit Decorations ===
Ribbon	Award	Year	Notes						
	Presidential Unit Citation	2003	for service in Operation Iraqi Freedom	The Meritorious Unit Commendation	2010	for service in Operation Iraqi Freedom Operation New Dawm	The Meritorious Unit Commendation	2012	for service in Operation Enduring Freedom

=== Campaign streamers ===
Conflict	Streamer	Year(s)
Iraq War	Operation Iraqi Freedom I	2002–2003
Iraq War	Operation Iraqi Freedom III	2004–2006
Iraq War	Operation Iraqi Freedom V	2007–2008
