= 198th Regional Support Group =

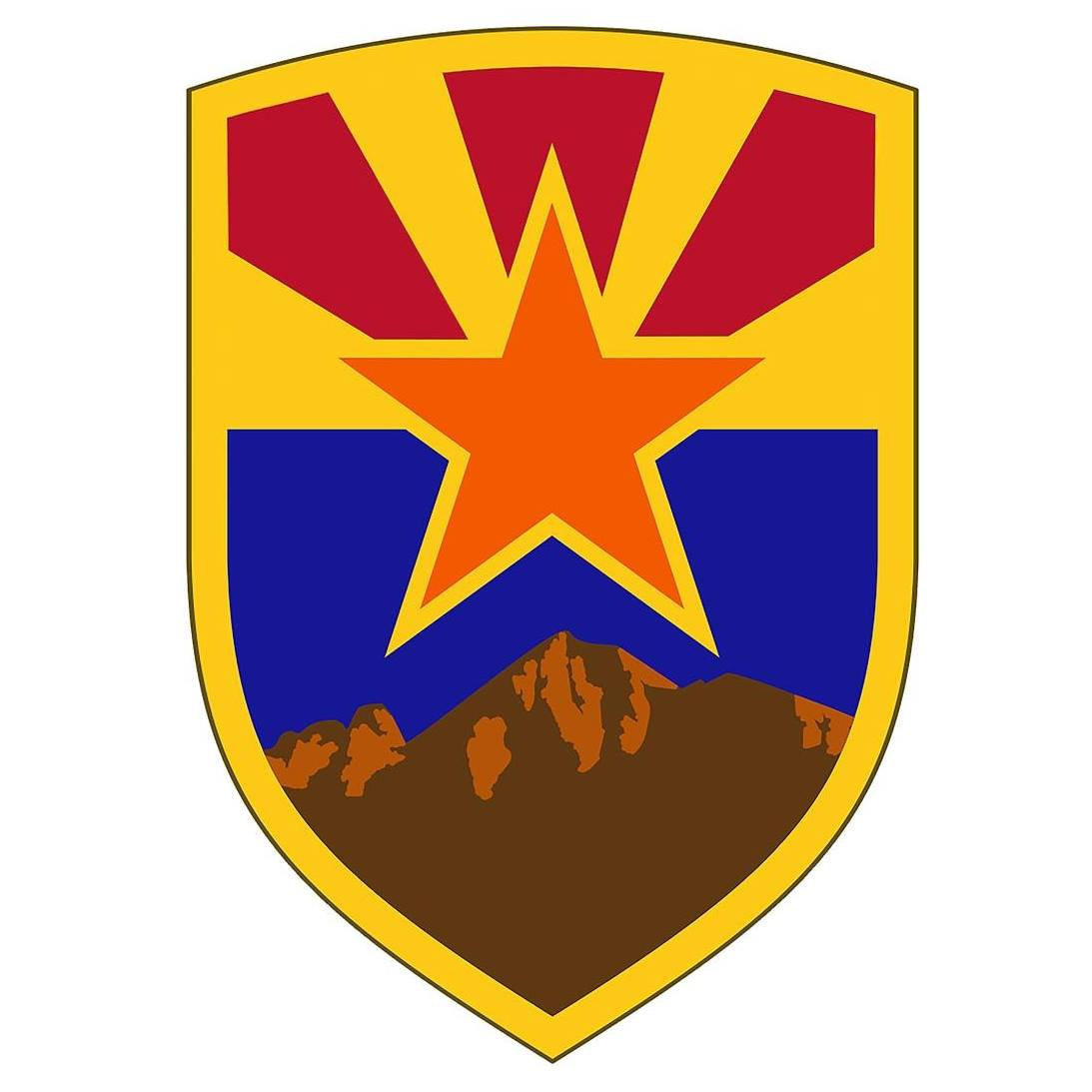
- Country: United States
- Branch: United States Army National Guard
- Role: Support
- Size: Group (Brigade)
- Part of: Arizona Army National Guard
- Garrison/HQ: Papago Park Military Reservation | Phoenix, Arizona
- Motto: Victory From Support

Commanders
- Current commander: Lt. Col. Julie Jarvis (acting)

Insignia
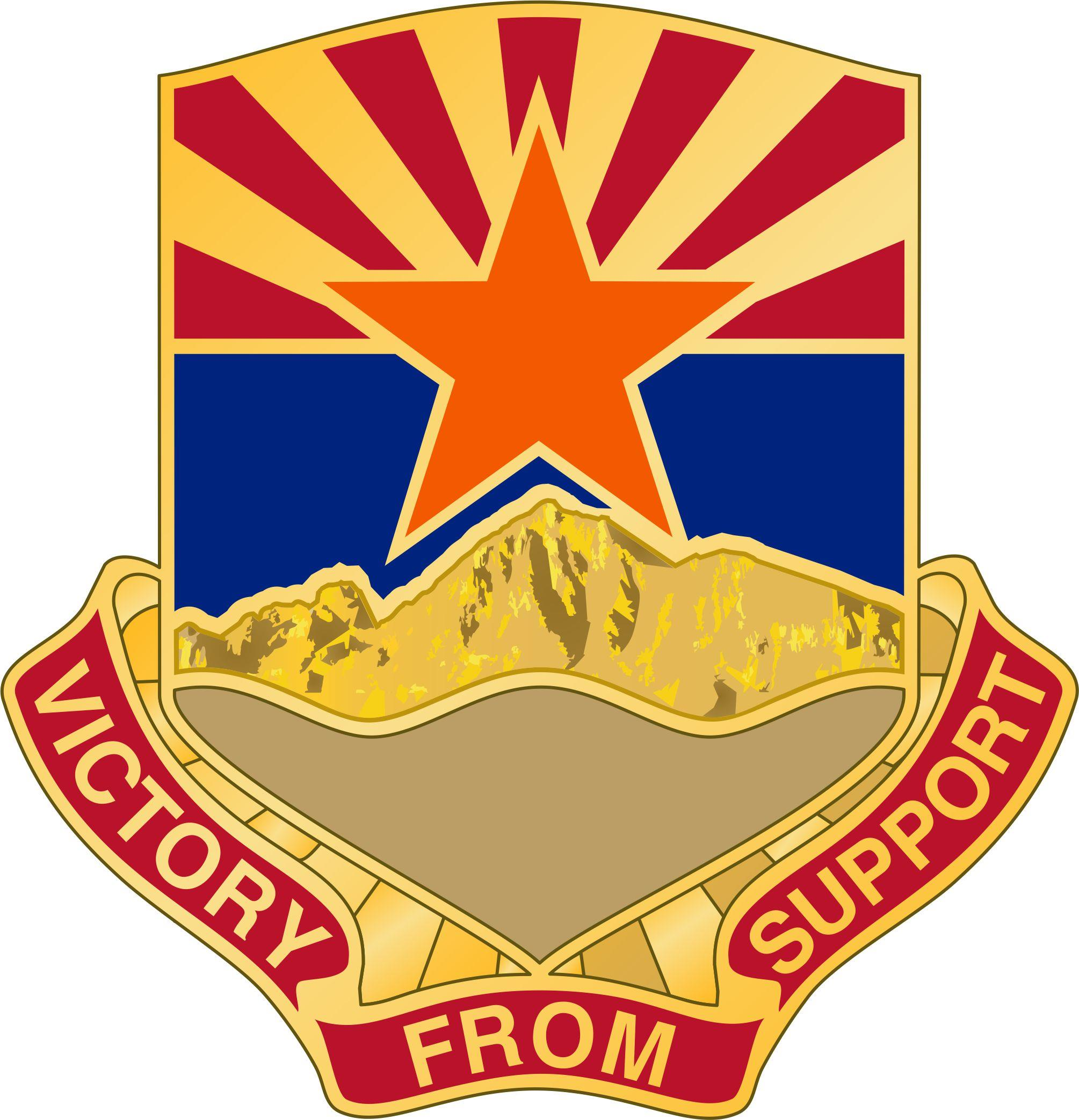
- 198th Regional Support Group DUI

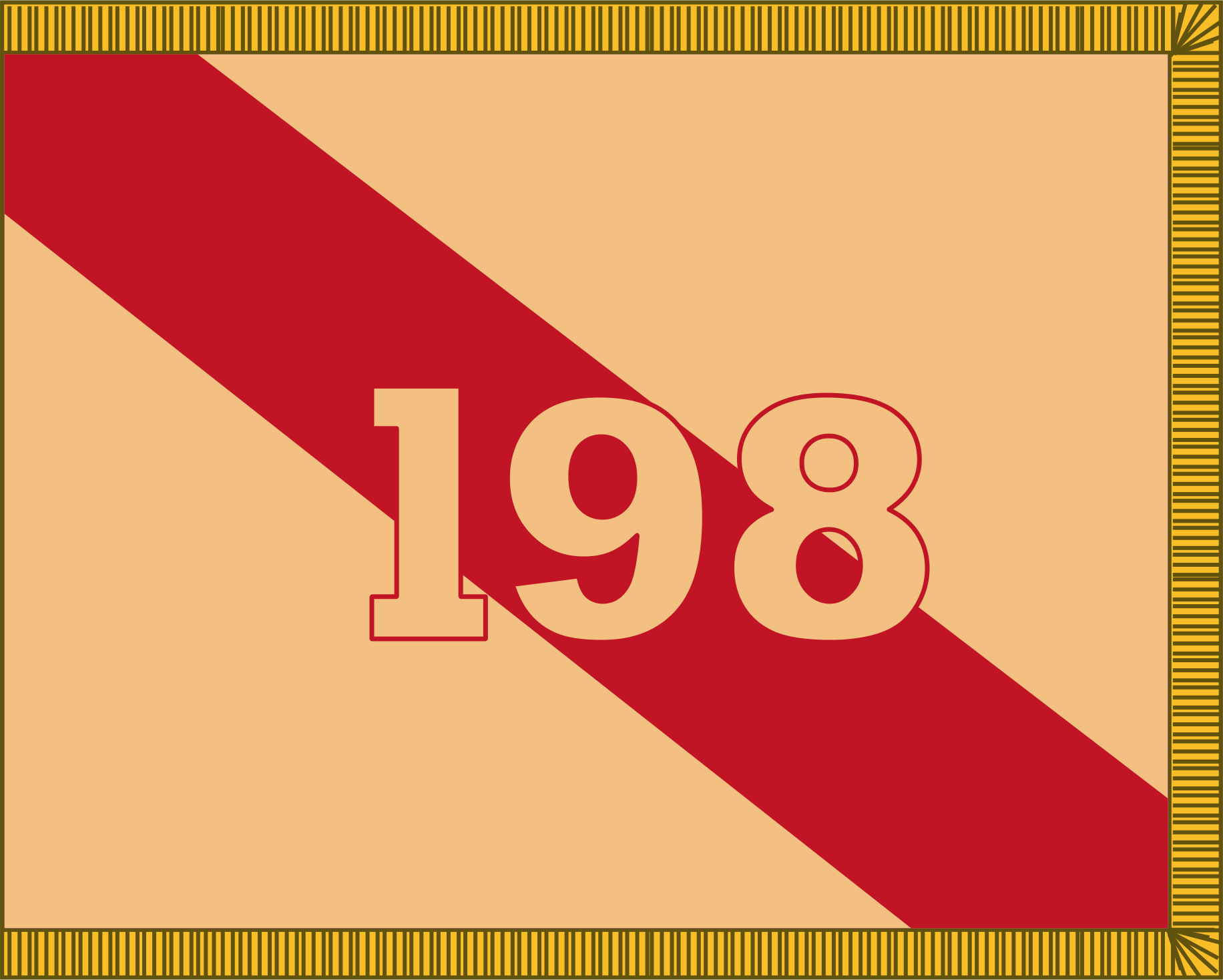
- 198th Regional Support Group Flag

The 198th Regional Support Group is a Combat Service Support unit of the Arizona Army National Guard since before 2011. It received its current insignia in 2017. The mission of the 198 RSG is to manage facilities and provide administrative and logistics support. As part of this mission, its constituent units provide support to combat and combat support units.

Col. Harold B. Jones, Jr. received the group flag during a change of command ceremony conducted January 8, 2011, at the Florence Military Reservation.

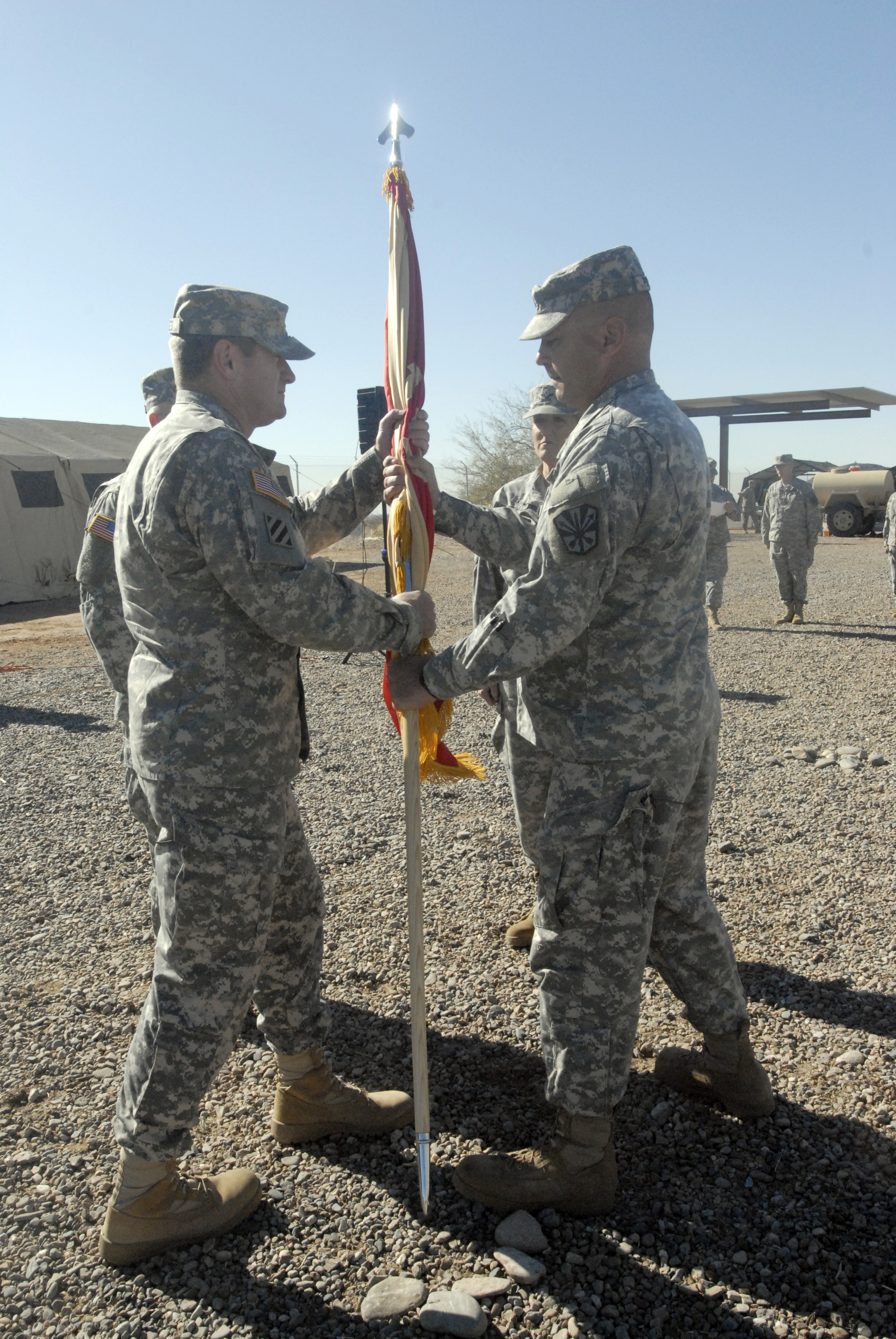
Col. Harold B. Jones, Jr. receives the group flag during a change of command ceremony conducted January 8, 2011, at the Florence Military Reservation.

In mid-2011, the group Headquarters and Headquarters Company was located in Phoenix.

In 2019, soldiers of the unit were deployed for 12 months to Jordan. In 2023-2024 soldiers of the 198 RSG were deployed to Poland to support local troops as well as USAREUR forces.

== Subordinate Units ==
- 158th Combat Sustainment Battalion (CSSB)
- 153rd Combat Sustainment Battalion (CSSB)
