= 1st Armored Division Sustainment Brigade =

Basic logistics formation of the 1st Armored Division, US Army

- 1st Armored Division Shoulder sleeve insignia (SSI) and Combat Service Identification Badge worn by the 1st Armored Division Sustainment Brigade
- Active: 4 May 1966 – 20 October 1967; 21 September 1968 – 21 March 1973; 6 July 2005 – present
- Country: United States
- Allegiance: United States Army
- Branch: Active Duty
- Type: Sustainment Brigade
- Size: Brigade
- Part of: 1st Armored Division
- Garrison/HQ: Fort Bliss, Texas
- Nickname: "Wagonmaster" Brigade
- Motto: Support the Action

Commanders
- Brigade Commander: Col. Curtis A. Johnson
- Command Sergeant Major: Command Sgt. Maj. Larry A. Parks

Insignia
- Former 15th Sustainment Brigade SSI

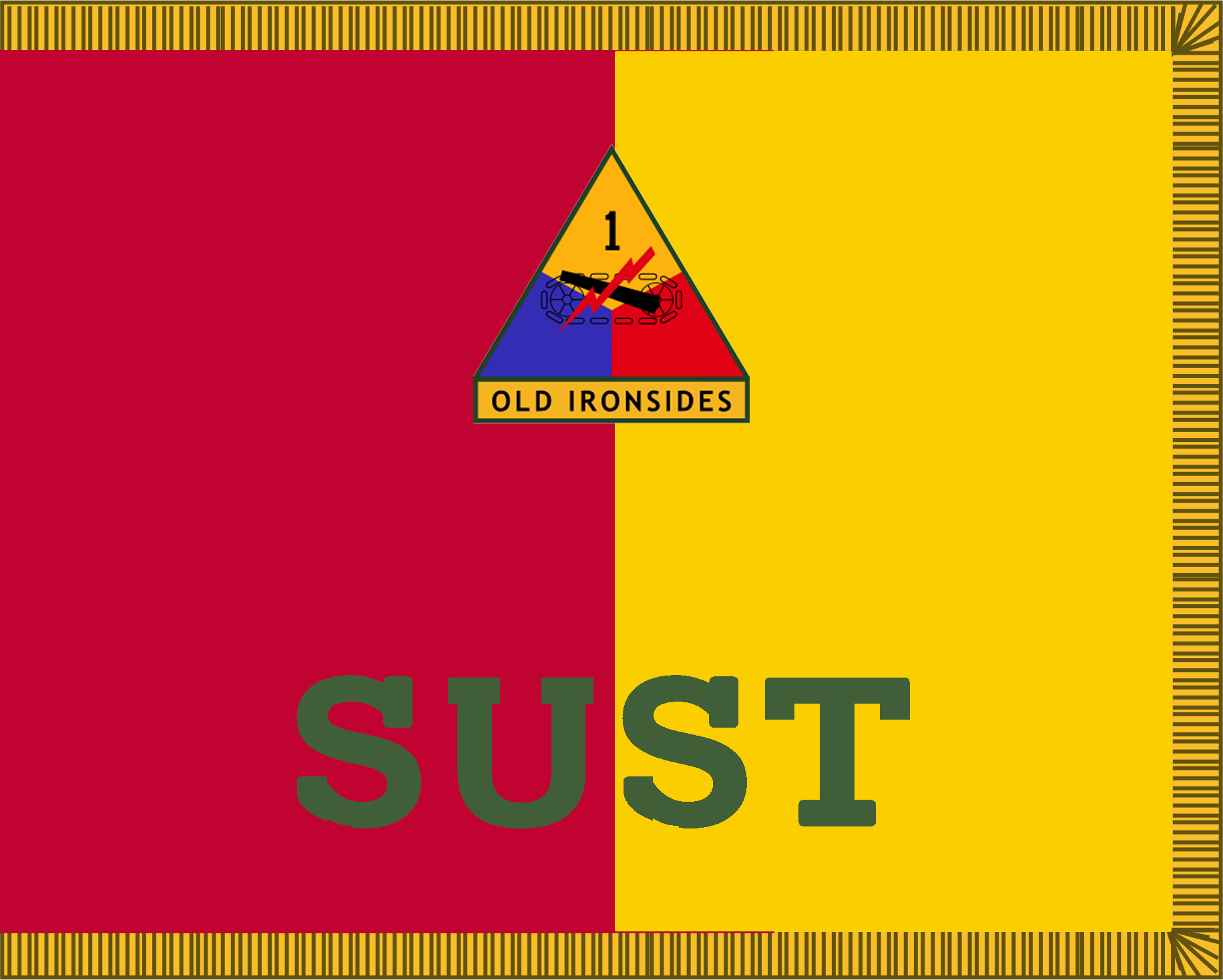
- 1st Armored Division Sustainment Brigade Flag

The 1st Armored Division Sustainment Brigade is a sustainment brigade of the United States Army based at Fort Bliss, Texas. It provides logistics support to the 1st Armored Division.

The brigade's lineage dates back to 1919, and it had a long and decorated history when designated as the supply command of the 1st Cavalry Division. Having seen service in every major conflict of the 20th century in support of its parent division, the unit was not designated as the 15th Sustainment Brigade permanently until 2005. In February 2008, the brigade was reassigned to the 13th Sustainment Command (Expeditionary), ending almost a century of association with the 1st Cavalry Division.

The 15th Sustainment Brigade's extensive lineage also carries many honors for the unit. What is now the 15th Sustainment Brigade, and its previous incarnations, have earned 17 campaign streamers, as well as numerous awards, mostly for service during the Vietnam War. These decorations include the Presidential Unit Citation, the Valorous Unit Award, and five Meritorious Unit Commendations.

== Organization ==
The 15th Sustainment Brigade was permanently attached to the 1st Cavalry Division, though it could operate independently when needed. Currently, it falls under the organization of the 1st Armored Division, having relocated as part of the Base Realignment and Closure 2005. This assignment allows the unit maximum flexibility when deployed, as it can provide any support function needed, without being permanently attached to any particular unit or area of operations.

The unit has two permanently assigned battalions along with its Headquarters and Headquarters Company (HHC). They consist of the 15th Special Troops Battalion, and the 142nd Combat Sustainment Support Battalion which are also headquartered at Fort Bliss, Texas. 72nd Brigade Support Battalion inactivated in November 2014, in conjunction with inactivation of 212th Fires Brigade (United States) in July 2014. In addition, Company A, 125th Brigade Support Battalion (formerly with 3rd BCT), in conjunction with the inactivation of 3rd BCT, completed a high-visibility project: Company A produced the first Redistribution Property Accountability Team (RPAT) yard in the continental US, which gives commanders a clear picture of property redistribution, especially during a unit's closure. The brigade command is modular in design, allowing it to assume command of additional units when deployed. The command is preparing for deployment to Southwest Asia in 2015.

== History ==
=== Origins ===
The 15th Support Brigade was originally constituted on 4 May 1966 in the Regular Army as a Headquarters and Headquarters Company. It was first activated on 1 July 1966. On 20 October 1967, the 15th Support Brigade was inactivated after providing support to units in Vietnam, only to be reactivated on 21 September 1968 at Fort Lewis, Washington. The Brigade later inactivated at Fort Lewis on 21 March 1973 having received campaign credits for its support for Counteroffensive Operations (Phase II and III) in Vietnam.

As mentioned above, the 15th Support Brigade replaced the "Division Support Command" of the 1st Cavalry Division. The history of the organization can be traced back to 1919 when one of its present units, the 15th Forward Support Battalion, existed as the 615th Motor Transport Company. The Division Support Command (DISCOM) thus predated the 1st Cavalry Division itself, which was not established until 1921.

In the years before World War II, most of the units of the 1st Cavalry Division that were not assigned to larger unit commands were under the control of the Headquarters, Division Special Troops of the division; an independent unit for various supporting units for a division. These included the service and support elements of the division. After World War II, however, the Special Troops Headquarters was reorganized into Headquarters, Division Trains. This designation immediately predates the "Division Support Command" (DISCOM) designation. The division trains were activated 1 November 1957 in Korea. Although a new organization, 1st Cavalry Division's Division Trains employed concepts and tactics similar to those of U.S. armored division trains that were originated in World War I.

=== Vietnam War ===
Insignia of the 1st Cavalry Division, the former commanding unit of the 15th Sustainment Brigade and basis for its own insignia.

On 1 September 1963, Headquarters, Division Trains was reorganized under the "R.O.A.D." (Reorganization of the Army Divisions) plan and redesignated as Headquarters, Headquarters Company and Band, 1st Cavalry Division, 1st Cavalry Division Support Command. Accompanying the division to Vietnam in August 1965, the Support Command participated in all of the same campaigns that the division did, providing logistics support for the 1st Cavalry Division throughout the entire conflict.

The unit's first major operation was the Pleiku campaign. During this action, the command supported the division during 35 days of continuous airmobile operations. The opening battle of the campaign, the Battle of Ia Drang Valley, was described in the book We Were Soldiers Once...And Young which was also the basis of the subsequent Mel Gibson film We Were Soldiers.

For most of 1967 and early 1968, the formation supported the 1st Cavalry Division through Operation Pershing. This was a large scale search of areas under the jurisdiction of the US II Corps which, according to the US Army, saw 5,400 enemy killed and 2,000 captured. The division re-deployed to Camp Evans, north of Hue in the I Corps Tactical Zone, during the 1968 Tet Offensive It was involved in recapturing Quang Tri and Hue regions. After intense fighting in Hue, the division then moved to relieve US Marine Corps units besieged at the Khe Sanh combat base in Operation Pegasus through March 1968. The 1st Cavalry Division next conducted major clearing operations in the Ashau Valley from mid-April through mid-May 1968. From May until September 1968, the division participated in local pacification missions, as well as Medical outreach programs intended to offer medical support to the Vietnamese local population. During this time, the division and support command were assigned to I Corps.

In the autumn of 1968, the 1st Cavalry Division relocated south to the III Corps Tactical Zone northwest of Saigon, adjacent to a Cambodian region commonly referred to as the "Parrots Beak", due to its shape. In May 1970, the division was among U.S. units participating in the Cambodian Incursion, withdrawing from Cambodia on 29 June. The division thereafter took a defensive posture while the withdrawal of U.S. troops from Vietnam continued. The bulk of the division was withdrawn on 29 April 1971.

The Division Support Command received all of the same honors as the division headquarters throughout the conflict. These awards included the Presidential Unit Citation for the actions in Pleiku Province and the Valorous Unit Award for action in the "Parrots Beak" area of Cambodia (referred to as the "Fish Hook" area in the unit's award streamer). In addition, Support Command received three Meritorious Unit Commendations and four Republic of Vietnam Cross of Gallantry awards throughout the deployments.

On 15 May 1971, the DISCOM was reorganized and designated as Headquarters and Headquarters Company, 1st Cavalry Division Support Command. Most major subordinate units of the DISCOM had returned from Vietnam in 1971 and were stationed at Fort Hood. By the end of June 1971, the DISCOM was a large command composed of HHC, Support Command, 15th Adjutant General Company/Band, 15th Medical Battalion, 15th Supply and Transport Battalion, 27th Maintenance Battalion, 8th Engineer Battalion, 315th Composite Support Battalion, 15th Finance Company (the latter two units had been transferred from the 1st Armored Division), and the 15th Data Processing Unit.

=== Reorganizations & The Gulf War ===
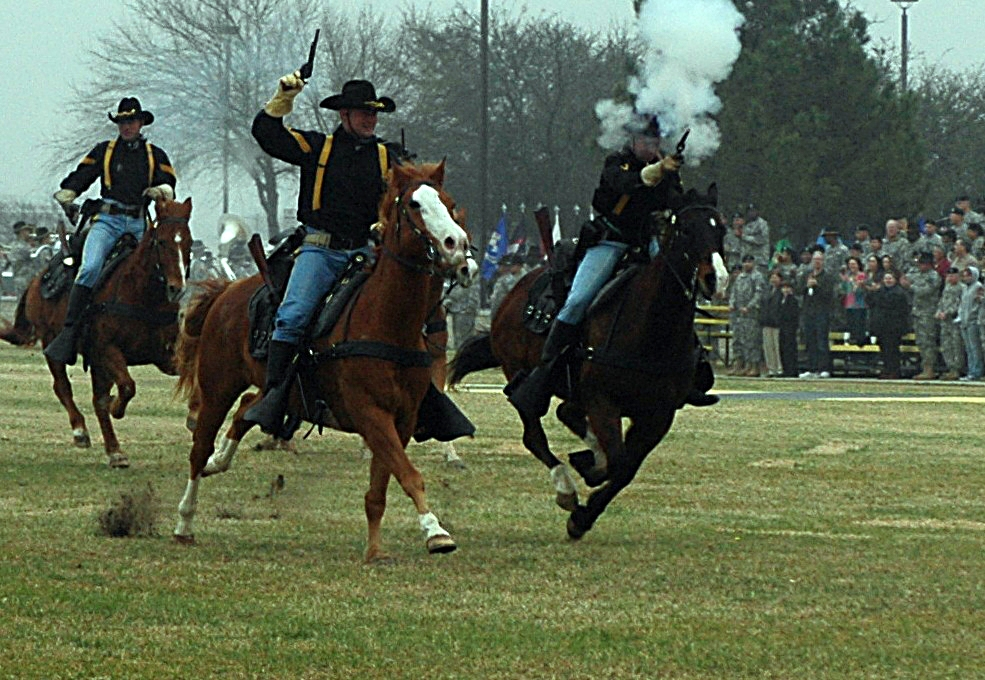
Soldiers of the 1st Cavalry Division perform a mock cavalry charge during the 15th Sustainment Brigade's change of command ceremony, alluding to the brigade's history as a cavalry unit.

During the early 1980s, the DISCOM consisted of a Headquarters Company, a Division Materiel Management Center, a Division Data Center, the 15th Medical Battalion, 15th Adjutant General Battalion, 15th Finance Company, 15th Supply and Transport Battalion, 27th Maintenance Battalion and the 68th Chemical Company. In October 1984, the 1st and 2nd Forward Support Battalions were activated from elements of the three functional battalions attached to the unit. The following year saw the Army of Excellence Reorganization (AOE) transform the remaining elements of the three functional battalions (maintenance, medical, and supply and transport) into the 4th Main Support Battalion. The AOE reorganization also added the 493rd Transportation Company (Aircraft Maintenance) to the Division Support Command. The forward and main support battalions, along with the Aviation Maintenance Company, were redesignated in 1987, becoming the 15th and 115th Forward Support Battalions, 27th Main Support Battalion, and 227th Transportation Company (Aviation Maintenance).

On 28 September 1990, the Division Support Command deployed to the Middle East in support of Operation Desert Shield. In January 1991, Division Support Command provided support to the 1st Cavalry Division throughout Operation Desert Storm, leading to a quick liberation of Kuwait. On 16 December 1991, the 215th Forward Support Battalion was activated at Fort Hood bringing the number of active duty forward support battalions to three. On 8 July 1996, the 615th Support Battalion (Aviation) was provisionally organized. The battalion was formally activated on 17 September 1996.

=== Activation & Operation Iraqi Freedom ===
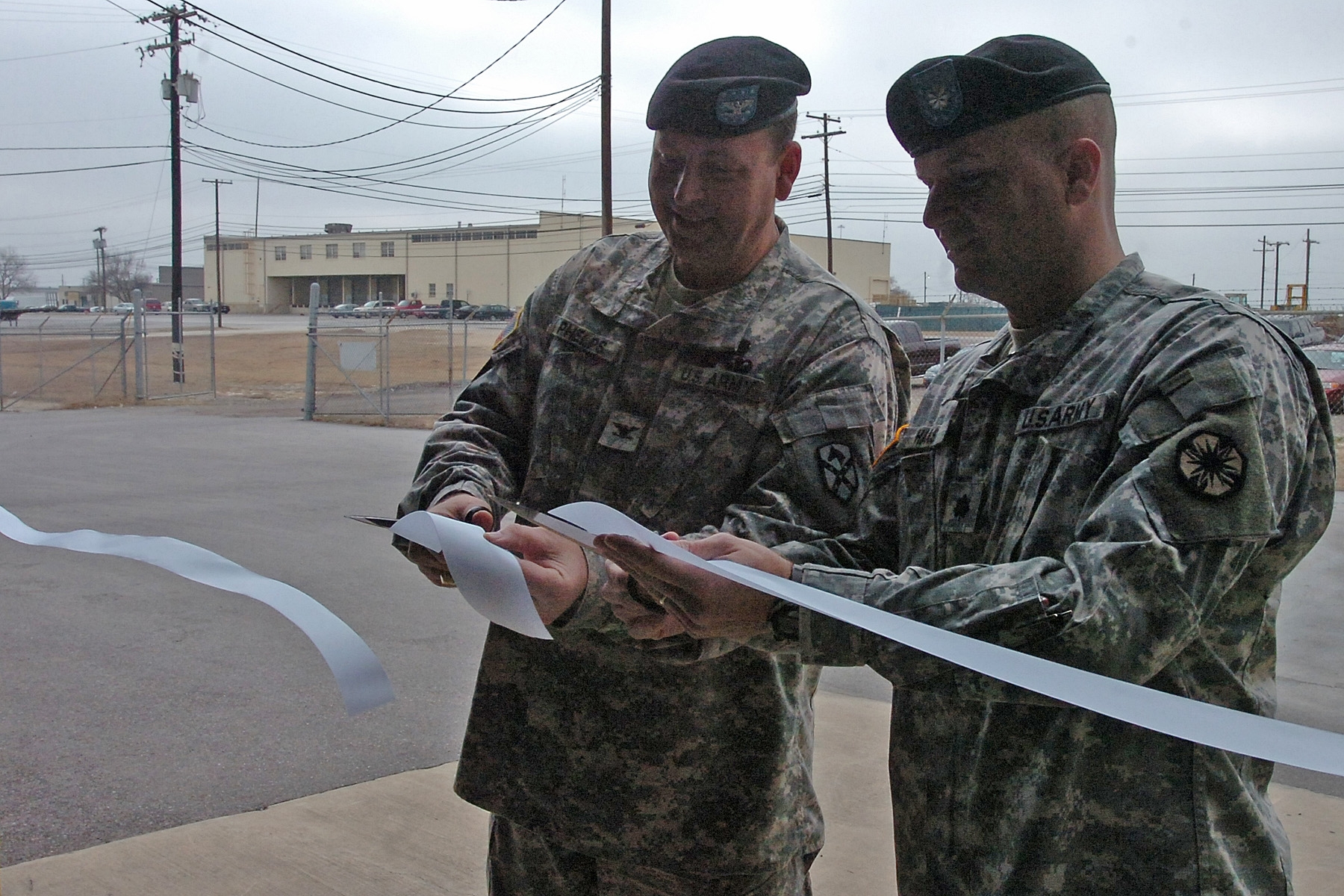
The brigade commander, Colonel Larry Phelps and the commander of the 49th Transportation Battalion cut a ribbon for a completed project during Operation Iraqi Freedom in February 2008.

On 6 July 2005, the Division Support Command (DISCOM) of the 1st Cavalry Division was inactivated and redesignated the 15th Sustainment Brigade. DISCOM's previously subordinate Forward Support Battalions were redesignated Brigade Support Battalions and task organized under their supported maneuver brigade.

The 15th Sustainment Brigade was the first element of the 1st Cavalry Division to return to Iraq and assumed control for logistics in the Baghdad area of operations in July 2006. The Brigade provided command and control for numerous units not normally associated with the 1st Cavalry Division. It had sustained several casualties during its tour in the country, including a mortar attack that killed two soldiers and injured five more in October 2007. Tasks the unit completed during its 2006–2007 tour in Iraq included construction and maintenance of sustainment facilities, and maintaining vehicles, including adding additional armor to Humvee vehicles for other US units operating in the country.

The Brigade changed its higher command for the first time in its history on 15 February 2008. It was reassigned from the 1st Cavalry Division to the 13th Sustainment Command (Expeditionary), holding a mock cavalry charge to celebrate the occasion. This would also mark the first time that the brigade served independently from the 1st Cavalry Division. Since returning from Iraq, the brigade has undertaken a number of duties around Fort Hood. These activities include testing new systems for use during deployments, remodeling infrastructure around the fort, and training on personal safety.

== Honors ==
=== Unit Decorations ===
Ribbon	Award	Year	Notes
	Presidential Unit Citation (Army)	1967	for fighting in the Pleiku
	Valorous Unit Award	1965–1967	streamer embroidered "Fish Hook"
	Meritorious Unit Commendation (Army)	1967–1968	for service in Vietnam
	Meritorious Unit Commendation (Army)	1968–1969	for service in Vietnam
	Meritorious Unit Commendation (Army)	1970–1971	for service in Vietnam
	Meritorious Unit Commendation (Army)	1990–1991	for service in Southwest Asia
	Meritorious Unit Commendation (Army)	2004–2005	for service in Southwest Asia
	Republic of Vietnam Cross of Gallantry with Palm	1965–1969	for service in Vietnam
	Republic of Vietnam Cross of Gallantry with Palm	1969–1970	for service in Vietnam
	Republic of Vietnam Cross of Gallantry with Palm	1970–1971	for service in Vietnam
	Republic of Vietnam Civil Action Honor Medal, First Class	1969–1970	for service in Vietnam

=== Campaign streamers ===
Conflict	Streamer	Year(s)
Vietnam War	Vietnam Defense	1965
Vietnam War	Counteroffensive, Phase I	1965–1966
Vietnam War	Counteroffensive, Phase II	1966–1967
Vietnam War	Counteroffensive, Phase III	1967–1968
Vietnam War	Tet Counteroffensive	1968
Vietnam War	Counteroffensive, Phase IV	1968
Vietnam War	Counteroffensive, Phase V	1968
Vietnam War	Counteroffensive, Phase VI	1968–1969
Vietnam War	Tet 69/Counteroffensive	1969
Vietnam War	Summer–Fall 1969	1969
Vietnam War	Winter–Spring 1970	1970
Vietnam War	Sanctuary Counteroffensive	1970
Vietnam War	Counteroffensive, Phase VII	1970–1971
Gulf War	Defense of Saudi Arabia	1991
Gulf War	Liberation and Defense of Kuwait	1991
Operation Iraqi Freedom II	Iraq	2004–2005
Operation Iraqi Freedom 06-08	Iraq	2006–2007
Operation Iraqi Freedom 09-11	Iraq	2009–2010
Operation Enduring Freedom 13-14	Afghanistan	2013-2014

== Legacy ==
The Sustainment Brigade and its soldiers have been the subject of numerous army publications during its tours in Iraq, most of which having to do with the culture and lifestyle of soldiers serving the unit. Among these have been feature stories by the Multi-National Force: Iraq public affairs office, on married soldiers who deploy together. The Army Logistician, an Army publication for soldiers serving in support units, published a feature story on the stories of soldiers serving in Iraq for their September–October 2007 issue. This story was intended to display the versatility of sustainment brigades overall. Another story was written for defenselink.mil, the press service for the United States Armed Forces in March 2007 about soldiers of the brigade and how they react to the desert climate of the country, having to cope with sandstorms and other issues.
