= 142nd Division Sustainment Support Battalion =

142nd Division Sustainment Support Battalion (142nd DSSB)
- Active: 13 January 1944 – Present
- Country: United States of America
- Allegiance: United States Army
- Branch: Regular Army
- Type: Battalion
- Role: Force sustainment
- Part of: Forces Command
- Garrison/HQ: Fort Bliss
- Nickname: Atlas
- Motto: "Support For Strength"

Commanders
- Current commander: LTC Jamail R. McGlone
- Command Sergeant Major: CSM Christopher R. Lockett

142nd Division Sustainment Support Battalion (142nd DSSB) is a multifunctional logistics headquarters. It is task organized as a Division Sustainment Support Battalion with capability required to support specified mission requirements. The CSSB supports echelon above brigade units, multifunctional brigades (maneuver enhancement brigade, field artillery brigade, and combat aviation brigade), functional support brigades (military police, signal, and engineer brigades), and brigade combat teams. The 142nd DSSB is currently stationed at Fort Bliss, Texas, and is a subordinate unit of the 1st Armored Division Sustainment Brigade.

== Capabilities ==
The role of a DSSB is to exercise mission command for task organized companies, teams, and detachments executing logistics operations. The DSSB is task organized with functional companies, teams, and detachments. It is designed to employ and control up to six company-sized units conducting logistics operations. The requirements for the number and type of units attached to a CSSB is mission dependent. Attaching additional units to a CSSB task organization may increase responsiveness but reduces agility of the CSSB specifically in the ability to provide effective mission command. See ADRP 6-0, Mission Command.

== History ==
- 13 January 1944 Constituted as Headquarters and Headquarters Detachment, 142d Quartermaster Battalion, Mobile.
- 31 January 1944 activated at Camp Butner, North Carolina
- 1 September 1946 reorganized and redesignated as Headquarters and Headquarters Detachment, 142d Quartermaster Battalion.
- 8 December 1950 allotted to the Regular Army
- 15 December 1962 reorganized as the 142d Quartermaster Battalion (Direct Support)
- 1 October 1964 inactivated at Pusan, Korea
- 16 March 1981 reactivated and redesignated at Wiesbaden, Germany, as Headquarters and Headquarters Company, 142d Supply and Service Battalion
- 25 January 1993 reorganized and redesignated as the 142d Corps Support Battalion and moved from Germany to Fort Polk, LA.
- 17 August 2005 142nd conducts Relief in Place for 17th Corps Support Battalion LSA Diamondback, Mosul Iraq
- 3 July 2006 142nd conducts Transfer of Authority to 352nd Corps Support Battalion LSA Diamondback, Mosul Iraq
- 15 October 2006 finally reorganized and redesignated to its current designation as the 142d Combat Sustainment Support Battalion.
- 1 May 2009 battalion moves from Fort Polk, LA, to Fort Bliss, TX.
- 26 May 2011 142nd conducts Relief in Place for the 17th Combat Sustainment Support Battalion, Bagram Airfield Afghanistan
- 28 April 2012 142nd conducts Transfer of Authority to the 548th Combat Sustainment Support Battalion, Bagram Airfield Afghanistan
- 7 August 2014 142nd conducts Transfer of Authority to the 553rd Combat Sustainment Support Battalion, Bagram Airfield Afghanistan
- 24 April 2021 142nd conducts Transfer of Authority to the 393rd Combat Sustainment Support Battalion, Camp Buehring, Kuwait
- 21 October 2021 142nd Division Sustainment Support Battalion (DSSB) companies uncased their newest guidons, Alpha Company formerly known as the 504th Composite Supply Company, Bravo Company formerly known as the 147th Support Maintenance Company, and Charlie Company formerly known as the 47th Transportation Company.

=== Korean War ===
The Pittsburgh Press - 20 October 1951 Missing 'Epistle' Bronze Star Clue

Capt. Thomas H. Westermann is a letter writer with a system. First of all, he has written his wife, Mary, of 104 W. Steuben St., Crafton, every day since he left Pennsylvania Station and home last 27 Dec.. Every day, that is, except one. This day has gone down on the family calendar as an eventful day. Capt. Westermann copped the Bronze Star on this occasion for heroic deeds in Korea proved his undoing. Try as he did to conceal his exploits from the family, his letter-writing system proved his undoing. Seems he numbers every letter he writes. When Mrs. Westermann last heard from him on 8 October, he had been away from home 285 days. Thus the note that day was labeled "Daily Epistle No. 285." Capt. Westermann, a native of Carnegie, is plans and operations officer of the 142nd Quartermaster Battalion in Korea. His outfit operates one of the largest supply depots on this side of the 38th Parallel. The supply dump bulges with ammunition, shells, food, and vital fuel. On 11 February, a train loaded with ammunition and high explosive shells caught fire at the depot. In a matter of minutes, it seemed the whole dump was going to blow up. Rations, arms, and fuel which had been lugged overseas for months to put a muscle in the U.N. punch were being destroyed. Capt. Westermann refused to quit the supplies although explosions were rocking the area a mile around the dump. He and a small band of GIs braved the flying shell fragments and exploding ammo to save 43 carloads of supplies and several hundred tons of ammunition. They battled the fire 24 hours. Capt. Westermann missed writing Letter 46 that night. Next evening, before he sank into his bed, he wrote: "Dear Mary: Sorry I couldn't write last night. We had a little fire here." At the top of the note, he scribbled Nos. 46-47. "I didn't worry," Mrs. Westermann explained, "but I knew something serious had happened." A few weeks ago, she received a small box mailed from Korea. Inside was the Bronze Star. The accompanying citation, describing Capt. Westermann's bravery revealed for the first time what had happened to "Daily Epistle No. 46."

=== Korean Armistice ===
Pusan, South Korea, December, 1957: The picture to the right shows Master Sgt. Robert S. Boyd, left, and Pvt. Allen G. Ladwig check a mountain of boxes containing stored meals at the 142nd Quartermaster Battalion's Plant No. 1. The giant supply operation was responsible for, among other things, receiving, storing and issuing all perishable foods arriving at Pusan port from the U.S., Japan and Okinawa. The 142 used 100 tons of ice and 1.5 million pounds of salt to keep everything fresh during the summer; a bakery unit attached to the battalion baked about 45,000 one-pound loaves of bread per month for troops in the Pusan Area Command.

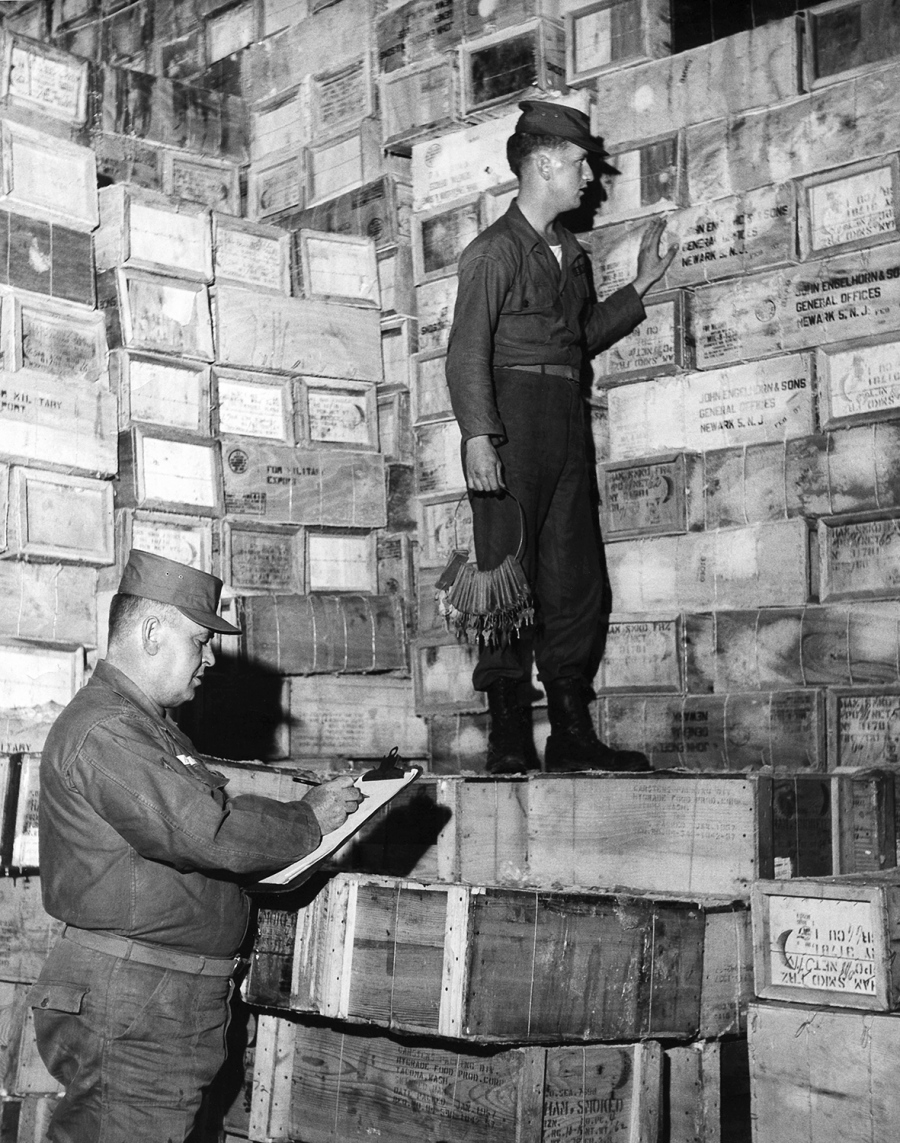
142nd Soldiers in Korea inventory rations

1 May 1955, the 55th Quartermaster Base Depot was relocated to Bupyong (ASCOM city), subsequently named Camp Market. The 142nd Quartermaster Battalion was moved from Masan and assumed the mission of providing Quartermaster support to US/UN Forces in the Southern area plus Class I perishable support for all US Forces in Korea.

=== Operation Iraqi Freedom I ===
The battalion was deployed to Iraq from 6 April 2003 to 8 April 2004. Crossed LD ISO 3d ACR providing DS CSS to Corps units within 3d ACR task organization. Occupied Forward Log Base PECAN and supported 3d ACR and 2/3 ID throughout Al Anbar Province (MND-W). Supported the relief in place of 3d ACR and 82d ABN DIV by providing direct support to 82d combat forces until closure of the 82d Division Support Command (DISCOM). Supported non-divisional forces in 82d Task Organization, provided reinforcing support to 82d DISCOM and provided DS CSS on an area basis upon closure of the 82d DISCOM. Provided initial support to 1 MEF & 1 FSSG (USMC) during the TOA with TF 82.

Bulk Fuel Operations

- Served as liaison to COSCOM for all bulk fuel storage and distribution issues in MND-W sector
- Operated 350,000 gal bulk fuel facility on FOB RIDGWAY
- Average daily issues = 30,000 gal
- Deployed Fuel System Supply Point (FSSP) to two locations in support of 82d ABN DIV RSOI
- Supported 1/1 IN w/ fuel distribution (5K tankers) to Junction City
- Supported 82 ABN DIV CA initiatives with captured Iraqi fuel
- 5,375,213 total gallons distributed

Bulk Water Operations

- Served as liaison to COSCOM for all water production and storage issues in MND-W sector
- Potable water production operations at Al Asad and FOB RIDGWAY
- Average daily water production at FOB RIDGWAY = 140,000 gal
- Storage capacity = 300,000 gal
- 12,777,080 total gallons produced
- Transitioned to LOGCAP water production & storage

Field Service Operations

- Sole provider of military shower, laundry and clothing repair (SLCR)in MND-W sector
- Had 3 additional SLCR detachments at one time
- Conducted SLCR operations at 8 locations
- Transitioned to LOGCAP laundry and bath operations
- Completed 120,171 bundles of laundry and provided 265,213 showers

Ammunition Operations

- Operated the only two ASPs in Iraq
- Operated Ammo Support Activity at TAJI ISO 1AD CLV Retrograde
- Ammo Support Activity established at RIDGWAY in mid-Feb ’04
- Established and operated regional CEA depot until transition to contract
- Supported CEA reduction efforts at FOB RIDGWAY – clearing 1,210 st
- Managed over 800st CLV at RIDGWAY ASP

Maintenance Operations

- 602d OD Co provided DS maintenance support to non-DIV units VIC FOB RIDGWAY and back-up support to 82d DISCOM
- Deployed 5 MSTs ISO 3d ID, 82d ABN DIV, and 1st AD
- Provided recovery support as required throughout AO
- Conducted convoy security missions for contracted trucks

Transportation Operations

- Provided back-up transportation to TF 82
- Provided GS transportation support as directed by 16th CSG
- Routinely operated at over 75% of capability
- Averaged 4-6 convoys per week
- Long-term support of light forces w/ M923 5 ton cargo trucks
- Supported early retrograde of equipment to Kuwait ISO of TF82 forces
- Over 750,000 miles driven in Iraq

=== Operation Enduring Freedom III ===
The 142nd Corps Support Battalion deployed to LSA Daimondback Mosul Iraq in support of Operation Iraqi Freedom 05-07 between 23 July 2005 and 7 July 2006. The unit preceded the arrival of the 101° Sustainment Brigade by one month and immediately established command relationships with the 917" Corps Support Group and the I" Corps Support Command. Over the course of the deployment over 1,400 Soldiers fell under the 142nd command and control in 15 different units spread across five locations in MND-N. The 142nd became an integral team player and provided unmatched support to Task Force Freedom in Multi-National Forces-North West (MNF-N W) and its highly-diversified subordinates, including the 3s Armored Cavalry Regiment and 1/25 SBCT. The unit launched on average 7 Combat Logistical Patrols every night along the IED-infested roads of northern Iraq constantly, ranging from downtown Mosul to remote sites. The unit orchestrated incredibly detailed, comprehensive combined-arms mission sets which set the standard for Combat Service Support conduct of Combat Logistics Patrols (CLPs). It supervised the movement of Combat Logistics Patrols escorting 106,623 TCN Commercial Trucks traveling 1,746,812 miles, transporting 5,844 20 foot containers of various supplies throughout the theatre. The 142nd accomplished this with a varied unit set of Active Component (AC) and Reserve Component (RC), including two AC artillery batteries serving in lieu of transportation companies. Besides the more traditional reinforcing Direct Support (DS) to an Armored Cavalry Regiment (ACR), two consecutive Stryker Brigade Combat Teams (SBCTs) and a mechanized Brigade Combat Team (BCT), these missions also involved the daily escort of up to two 90-white-truck Third Country National (TCN) CLPs each way from the Iraqi-Turkish border with its rugged mountainous approaches to the General Support (GS) Hub for MND-N as well as the DS Hub. The unit relentlessly and meticulously sought ways to harness the latest technology in the counter-IED fight. In the process, the 142nd leadership became the Subject Matter Expert (SME) in the most effective placement and utilization of Electronic Counter-Measures (ECM). The 142nd also provided battalion-level command and control of both the internal and external Military Transition Teams (MiTTs) for the Iraqi Army (IA) 3s Division's Motorized Transportation Regiment (MIII). Under the mentorship of the 142nd the 3" MTR became the premier MTR of the Iraqi Army, a living symbol of Iraqi Soldiers serving brother Soldiers and civilians, including support during the historic 15 October 2005 Referendum and the 15 December 2005 Election. The unit lost two soldiers during the deployment, one to a HMMWV roll over accident and another to enemy small arms fire. After the roll over incident the 142nd worked to mitigate the risk by unveiling the first and only HMWVV Egress Assistance Trainer, or HEAT, in Iraq 14 June 2006, giving the Soldiers another weapon in the safety arsenal to combat HMWVV rollovers, which claimed 13 lives throughout Iraq in 2006 alone.

Logistical Statistics

- Management of 19.5 million gallons of Bulk fuel
- 676,189 gallons of water distribution
- 64,000 cases of various Class I products
- 61,717 receipts processed within the Supply Support Activity
- 7.6 million pounds of mail,
- 101 remains processed
- 45,000 Showers and
- 144,000 bundles of laundry
- 5,632 flights bringing in and out more than 10,740 pallets and 77,641 passengers
- 3,317 Direct Support maintenance job orders
- 82 off-FOB recovery missions

=== Operation Enduring Freedom ===
- The battalion deployed to Afghanistan 11 May 2011 to 3 May 2012. The multifunctional Battalion consisted of six Combat Service Support companies from multiple Army components deployed to Afghanistan consisting of 1,268 Soldiers and contract oversight of over 300 civilians. Provided direct support logistics, during the most austere challenging environments on earth; battling the harsh winters, demanding terrain, and relentless enemy; to more than 50,000 U.S. and Coalition Forces assigned to CJTF-I operating in Regional Command East (RC-E/C) to enable joint efforts in Counter Insurgency Operations. Managed 450 combat patrols, multiple company-level transitions, was responsible for the largest ammunition point in Afghanistan, thousands of containers and Host-Nation Trucks uploaded and downloaded. The battalion was the most complex of three Battalions in the 10th Sustainment Brigade; five transportation companies moving supplies daily to sustain the momentum of the campaign, helping to grow ANSF capability and facilitating the start of retrograde of the US Army’s excess property to CONUS. Supported Operation Devil Hammer, a surge brigade build-out for an Airborne Task Force, at the height of the winter season while enduring freezing temperatures, treacherous road conditions, and heavy snowfall. Set the right conditions for success during the 2012 spring and summer fighting seasons.
- The Battalion Deployed to Kandahar AB Afghanistan 1 May 2014 to 14 October 2014

== Honors ==
=== Unit decorations ===
Ribbon	Award	Period of Award	PO	Date
	Meritorious Unit Commendation	23 July 2005 to 22 July 2006	2016-13	19 October 2016
	Meritorious Unit Commendation	13 October 2007 to 5 January 2009	019-21	19 January 2010
	Meritorious Unit Commendation	11 May 2011 to 3 May 2012	173-12	21 June 2012
	Meritorious Unit Commendation	1 May 2014 to 14 October 2014	2019-07	23 October 2019

== Campaign participation credit ==
Conflict	Campaign Name	Year(s)	Streamer
World War II	European-African-Middle Eastern Theater without Inscription	1945	
Korean War	UN Defensive	15 September 1950	
Korean War	CCF Intervention	3 November 1950 – 24 January 1951	
Korean War	First UN Counteroffensive	25 January-21 April 1951	
Korean War	CCF Spring Offensive	22 April-8 July 1951	
Korean War	UN Summer-Fall Offensive	9 July-27 November 1951	
Korean War	Second Korean Winter	28 November 1951 – 30 April 1952	
Korean War	Summer-Fall 1952	1 May-30 November 1952	
Korean War	Third Korean Winter	1 December 1952 – 30 April 1953	
Korean War	Summer 1953	1 May-27 July 1953	
Operation Iraqi Freedom	Transition of Iraq	2 May 2003 – 28 June 2004	
Operation Iraqi Freedom	Iraqi Governance	29 June 2004 – 15 December 2005	
Operation Iraqi Freedom	National Resolution	16 December 2005 – 9 January 2007	
Operation Iraqi Freedom	Iraqi Surge	10 January 2007 – 31 December 2008	
Operation Iraqi Freedom	Iraqi Sovereignty	1 January 2009 – 31 August 2010	
Operation Enduring Freedom	Consolidation III	1 December 2009 – 30 June 2011	

== Fallen Soldiers Remembered ==
- Army Staff Sgt. Craig Davis 37, of Opelousas, Louisiana. Davis was on board a UH-60 Blackhawk helicopter when it crashed near Fallujah, Iraq while on a MEDEVAC mission. He was assigned to the 603rd Transportation Company, 142nd Corps Support Battalion, Fort Polk, Louisiana. Died on 8 January 2004.
- Army 2nd Lt. Clifford V. Gadsden 25, of Red Top, South Carolina. Gadsden died in Balad, Iraq, when a vehicle-born improvised explosive device detonated near his convoy vehicle. He was assigned to the 603rd Transportation Company, 142nd Corps Support Battalion, Warrior Brigade, Fort Polk, Louisiana. Died on 29 April 2005.
- Army Sgt. Frank M. Sandoval 27, of Yuma Arizona, died 18 June 2007, in Palo Alto, California, of wounds suffered when his unit was attacked in Tikrit on 28 Nov. 2005. He was assigned to Bravo Battery 2-5 FA, 142nd Corps Support Battalion, 101st Sustainment Brigade, LSA Diamondback Mosul Iraq.

== Subordinate units ==
2021- Garrison Operations Fort Bliss

- Headquarters and Headquarters Company (HHC)
- 504th Quartermaster Company
- 47th Transportation Company
- 68th Transportation Company
- 377th Transportation Company
- 606th Transportation Detachment

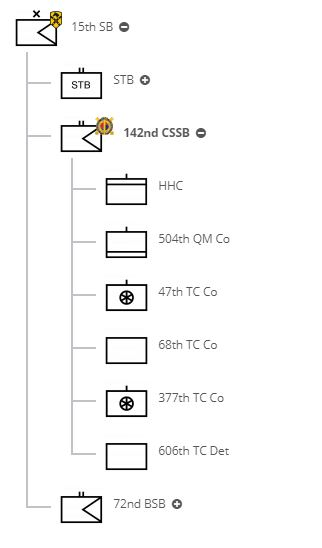

2020 - 2021 Kuwait Operation Spartan Shield Task Force Atlas 25 August 2020 – 24 April 2021

- Headquarters and Headquarters Company (HHC)
- 47th Heavy Composite Truck Company
- 154th Heavy Composite Truck Company
- 236th Inland Cargo Transfer Company (IL USAR
- 203rd Inland Cargo Transfer Company (MN USAR)
- 1487th Transportation Company (OH NG)
- 720th Transportation Company (NM NG)
- 227th Composite Supply Company
- 247th Composite Supply Company
- 3666th Support Maintenance Company (AZ NG) "Desert Demons"
- 3654th Support Maintenance Company (IA NG)
- 592nd Ordnance Company (MT USAR)
- 163rd Ordnance Company (CA USAR)
- 151st Quartermaster Detachment (Rigger)

2014 Afghanistan Taskforce Muleskinner 1 May 2014 to 14 October 2014

- Headquarters and Headquarters Company (HHC)
- 1460th Transportation Company - MI NG
- 1742nd Transportation Company - SD NG
- 1176th Transportation Company - TN NG
- 96th Transportation Company
- 111th Mortuary Affairs Team

2011-2012 Afghanistan

- Headquarters and Headquarters Company (HHC)
- 131st Transportation Company (PA NG)
- 109th Transportation Company
- 236th Inland Cargo Transfer Company
- 584th Maintenance Company
- 59th Quartermaster Company

2007-2009 Operation Iraqi Freedom V/VI 13 October 2007 to 5 January 2009

- Headquarters and Headquarters Company (HHC)
- 603d Transportation Light-Medium Truck Company
- 1710th Transportation Company
- 216th MP Company
- Company A, 39th BSB (TACON)
- Company F, 39th BSB (TACON)
- Company A, 217th BSB (TACON)
- Company B, 217th BSB (TACON)
- 206th Transportation Company
- 46th Chemical Company

2006-2007 Garrison Operations Fort Polk, LA

- Headquarters and Headquarters Company (HHC)
- 11th Public Affairs Detachment
- 383 Movement Control Team
- 488th Quartermaster Company
- 585 Movement Control Team
- 603d Transportation Light-Medium Truck Company
- 546th Support Maintenance Company
- F DET/ 18th PSB

2005-2006 LSA Diamondback Mosul Iraq Operation Iraqi Freedom III

- Headquarters and Headquarters Company (HHC)
- Bravo Battery 2-5 Field Artillery
- Alpha Battery 1-321st Field Artillery
- 872nd Maintenance Company USAR Ogden Utah
- 473rd Quartermaster Company
- 298th Ordnance Company
- 551st Inland Cargo Transfer Company

2004-2005 Garrison Operations Fort Polk, LA

- Headquarters and Headquarters Company (HHC)
- 11th Public Affairs Detachment
- C/126th Finance
- 383rd Movement Control Team
- 488th Force Provider Company
- 585th Movement Control Team
- 603d Transportation Light-Medium Truck Company
- 546th Support Maintenance Company
- E DET/ 18th PSB
- F DET/ 18th PSB

2003-2004 Operation Iraqi Freedom I, 6 April 2003 to 8 April 2004

- Headquarters and Headquarters Company (HHC)
- 209th QM (DS) (-) Indiana RC
- 602d Maint (DS) Ft Hood Organic to 553rd CSB
- 603d TC (LMT)(-) Ft Polk Organic to 142nd CSB
- 974th QM (FS)(-) Texas RC
- 608th OD CO (MOADS) Ft Benning Organic to 13th CSB
- 24th TC (PLS) Ft Riley Organic to 541st CSB
- 2632d TC (LMT) California NG

Attachments

- C/109th ASMC (DS) Colorado RC (mobilized 24 Jan 03)
- A76/16 Sig BN (DS) Ft Hood Organic to 16 Sig BN
- PLT, 528th POL CO Ft Lewis Task organized to 7th CSG
- ROWPU TM, 326th QM CO Pennsylvania Task organized to 7th CSG
- Bag PLT, 288th QM CO Ft Lewis Task organized to 7th CSG
- SLCR TM, 430th QM (FS) Puerto Rico RC (mobilized 15 Mar 03)

1981-1993 Germany

- Headquarters and Headquarters Company (HHC) (Camp Pieri in Wiesbaden)
- 24th Supply and Service Company (Giessen)
- 26th Supply and Service Company (Pioneer Kaserne in Hanau)
- 29th Supply and Service Company (Baumholder)
- 56th Repair Parts Supply Company (Pioneer Kaserne in Hanau)
- 58th General Supply Company (Schloss Kaserne in Butzbach)

1950-1953 Korean War

- Headquarters and Headquarters Company (HHC)
- 549th Quartermaster Laundry Company
- 20th Quartermaster Subsistence Supply Company
- ?? Pipeline Company
- 550th Quartermaster Refrigerator Company
- 108th Quartermaster Bakery Company Mobile

== Battalion Commanders ==
- LTC Richard E. Beale Jr. March 1981 — June 1982
- LTC Robert S. Hartman June 1982 — December 1984
- LTC Charles K. Ford December 1984 — January 1987
- LTC Rodney S. Okabayashi January 1987 — January 1989
- LTC Gary L. Juskowiak January 1989 — January 1991
- LTC Nancy E. Burton January 1991 — January 1993
- LTC Ronnie R. Roberts January 1993 — February 1995
- LTC Aaron B. Hayes February 1995 — February 1997
- LTC Sharon R. Duffy February 1997 — March 1999
- LTC John A. Herman March 1999 — May 2001
- LTC Mark A. Olinger May 2001 — June 2003
- LTC Michael G. Morrow June 2003 — May 2005
- LTC Ronald L. Green May 2005 — June 2007
- LTC Timothy A. McKernan June 2007 - June 2009
- LTC Peter J. Kim July 2009 - June 2011
- LTC Jose Solis June 2011 - Jan 2013
- LTC Edward Ivey January 2013 - January 2015
- LTC Raphael S. Heflin - January 2015 - December 2016
- LTC Asuero N. Mayo Jr. December 2016 - December 2018
- LTC Ryan Swedlow December 2018 — June 2021
- LTC Kalin M. Reardon June 2021 — June 2023
- LTC Steven T. Smith June 2023 - June 2025
- LTC Jamail R. McGlone June 2025 - present

== Command Sergeants-Major ==
- Command Sergeant Major Bobby Owens 1988
- Command Sergeant Major Oscar Patton 1991-1993
- Command Sergeant Major Edward L. Johnson 2005-2007
- Command Sergeant Major James Harmon
- Command Sergeant Major Patrick Daniel
- Command Sergeant Major Ibrahim Canbaz October 2015 - October 2017
- Command Sergeant Major Eric D. Hunt October 2017 - June 2020
- Command Sergeant Major Jefferey L. Gross II June 2020 – December 2022
- Command Sergeant Major Rodrigo Raeder December 2022 – November 2024
- Command Sergeant Major Christopher R. Lockett November 2024 - Present

== Distinguished Alumnus ==
1. MG Richard E. Beale, Jr. retired as Director of the Defense Commissary Agency (DECA) and former 142nd S&S Battalion Commander

== Miscellaneous News Articles ==
142nd S&S Batalion's 26th S&S Company trained for Mass Burial Cpl. William T. Westerdick

Soldiers, Families Not Alone In Maintaining Mental Health During COVID-19

Central Texas soldier hailed as hero after El Paso rampage found dead

Soldier channels training and courage during tragedy

Archived Facebook Newsfeed
