= 87th Division Sustainment Support Battalion =

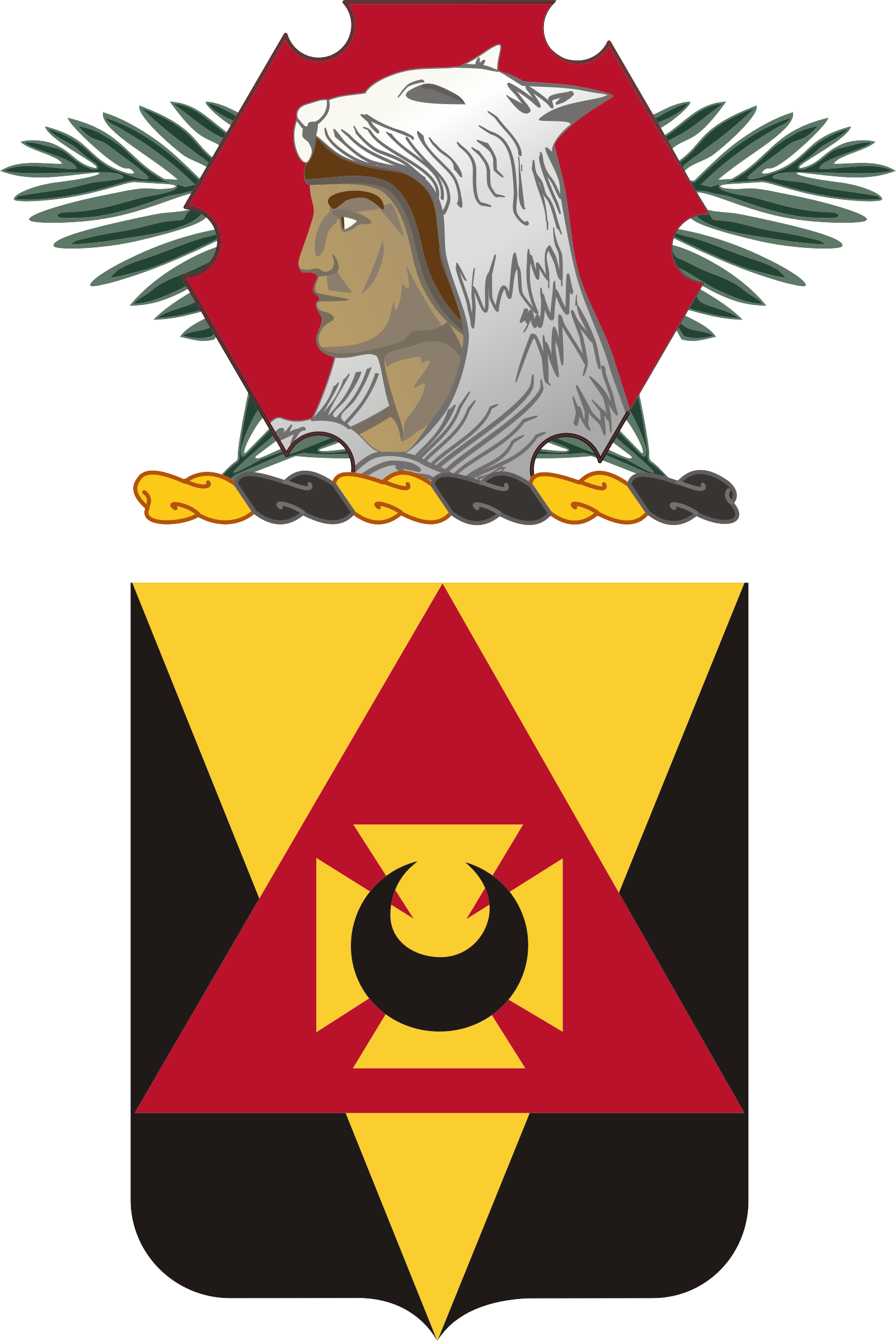
- Coat of arms
- Country: United States
- Branch: United States Army

Insignia
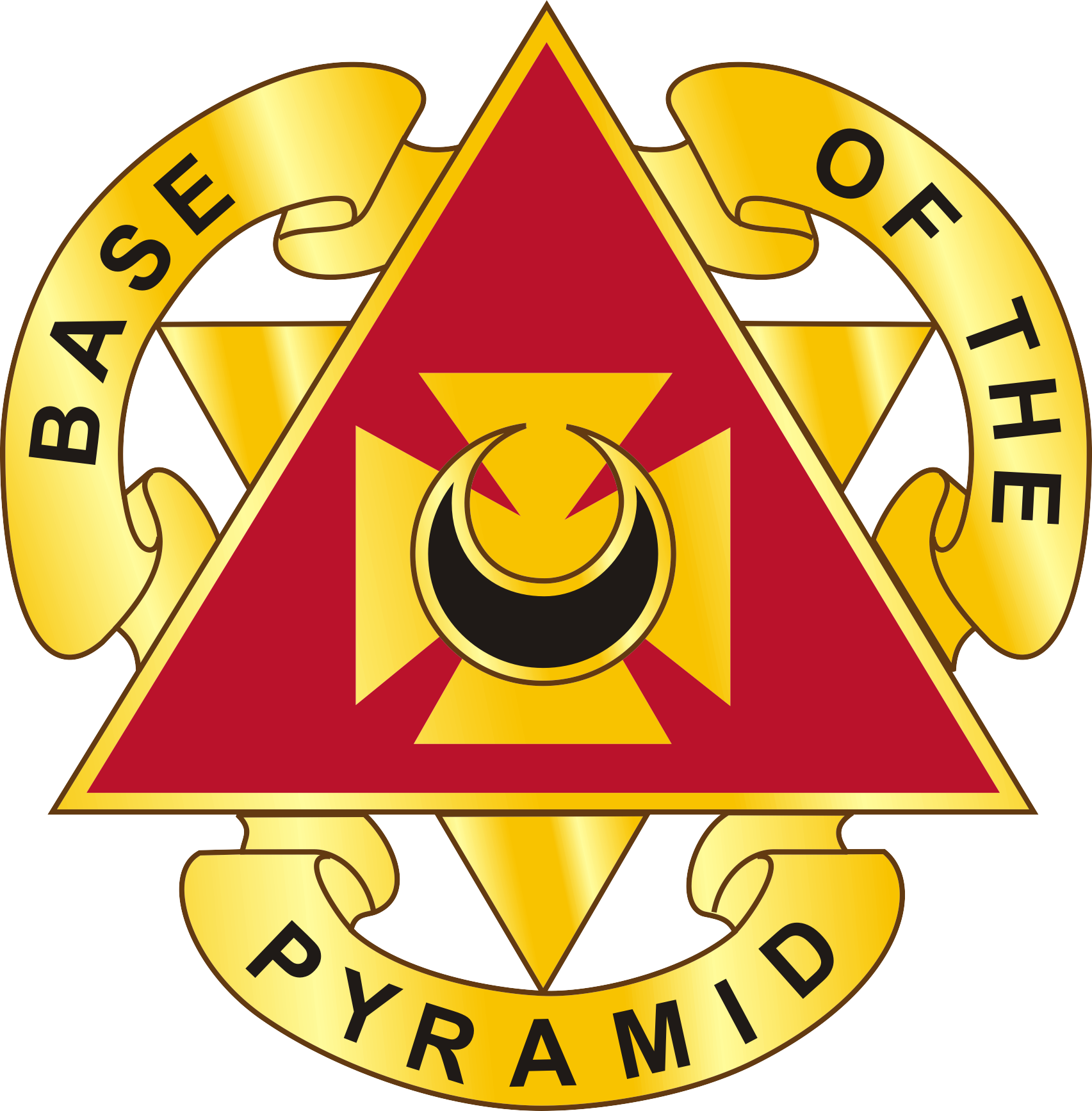
- Distinctive unit insignia

The 87th Support Battalion (Corps) was constituted on 1 May 1936 in the U.S. Army as the 87th Separate Quartermaster Battalion (Light Maintenance) at Fort Des Moines, Iowa.

In 2023, it was renamed from the 87th Combat Sustainment Support Battalion (CSSB) to the 87th Division Sustainment Support Battalion (DSSB) in accordance with new Army sustainment doctrine and unit designations.

The unit is headquartered at Fort Stewart, Georgia.

== Unit Organization ==
=== Pre-2023 ===
- 87th Combat Sustainment Support Battalion
  - Headquarters and Headquarters Detachment
  - 24th Ordnance Ammunition Company
  - 135th Quartermaster Fuel Company
  - 226th Composite Supply Company
  - 233rd Heavy Equipment Transportation Company (deactivated 15 JUN 15)
  - 396th Light-Medium Composite Truck Company
  - 495th Movement Control Team
  - 632nd Service Maintenance Company
  - 94th Maintenance Company

=== Post-2023 ===
In accordance with new Army doctrines and policies regarding Sustainment Brigades, subsequent deactivations and realignments were made within 87th DSSB.

- 87th Division Sustainment Support Battalion
  - Headquarters and Headquarters Detachment
  - Alpha Company
  - Bravo Company
  - Charlie Company
  - 24th Ordnance Ammunition Company
  - 135th Quartermaster Fuel Company

== Deployments ==
In November 1942, the battalion arrived in Africa. Assigned to II Corps, it was to provide 3rd Echelon Maintenance and Supply to Corps troops, 1st Infantry, 1st Armored and 34th Infantry Divisions in and around Oran, Algeria. In early 1943, the battalion was assigned to Fifth Army and then to the 1st Destroyer Group which operated south of Oran near Sebban. By September 1943, the battalion boarded the USS Korea for movement to Salerno, Italy.

Between September 1943 and July 1945, the battalion established a number of ammunition supply points throughout Italy, ranging from Prestum to Monecatini. In addition, the unit was tasked to provide material while working under adverse conditions. The unit handled 89,499 tons of ammunition during a 30-day period.

The battalion earned six battle streamers for participating in six major campaigns in North Africa and Italy. It also received a Meritorious Unit Commendation with streamer embroidered "EUROPEAN THEATER."

On 2 December 1990, the battalion advance party arrived in Saudi Arabia and on 15 December, the battalion began its movement to the desert in support of Operation Desert Shield. Immediately following Operation Desert Shield, the 87th Maintenance Battalion began preparation to reorganize from Wertheim, Germany to Fort Stewart as part of the Army European drawdown. The unit completed this mission on 1 Jan. 1992.

On 30 September 1992, the battalion deployed troops to Homestead Air Force Base, Florida, for Operation Hurricane Andrew Relief, to help support the citizens after a major national disaster. The troops returned on 6 November 1992. On 16 October 1993, the battalion was officially re-designated as the 87th Support Battalion (Corps) with the motto: "Base of the Pyramid".

On 11 September 1994, the battalion deployed to Operation Vigilant Warrior, Kuwait. While deployed, the battalion provided all classes of support to the 24th Infantry Division (Mechanized) deployed in theater.

From January 2005 to February 2006, the battalion deployed to Camp Taji, Iraq where they provided all classes of support, convoy security, force protection, and division distribution to the 3rd Infantry Division. The battalion drove more than two million miles, transporting multiple classes of supply, supporting election operations, and moving several combat units within the division's area of responsibility. The battalion also supported port operations as part of the division's redeployment.
