= Arizona Army National Guard =

Component of the US Army and military of the U.S. state of Arizona

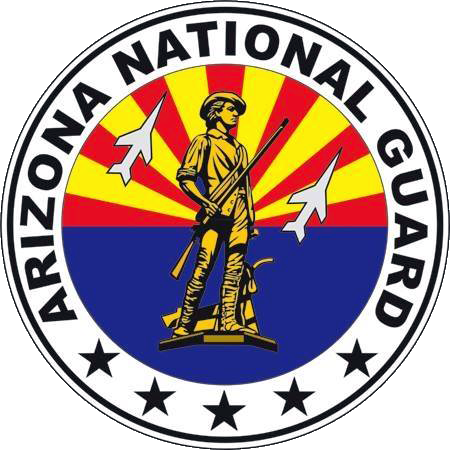
- Seal of the Arizona National Guard
- Active: 1865–present
- Country: United States
- Allegiance: Arizona
- Branch: United States Army National Guard
- Type: ARNG Headquarters Command
- Part of: Arizona National Guard
- Garrison/HQ: Phoenix, Arizona
- Mottos: Always Ready, Always there

Commanders
- Current commander: Brigadier General Lonnie J. Branum

Insignia
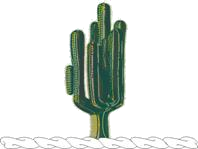
- Crest (Affixed to an Arizona Army National Guard unit's coat of arms)

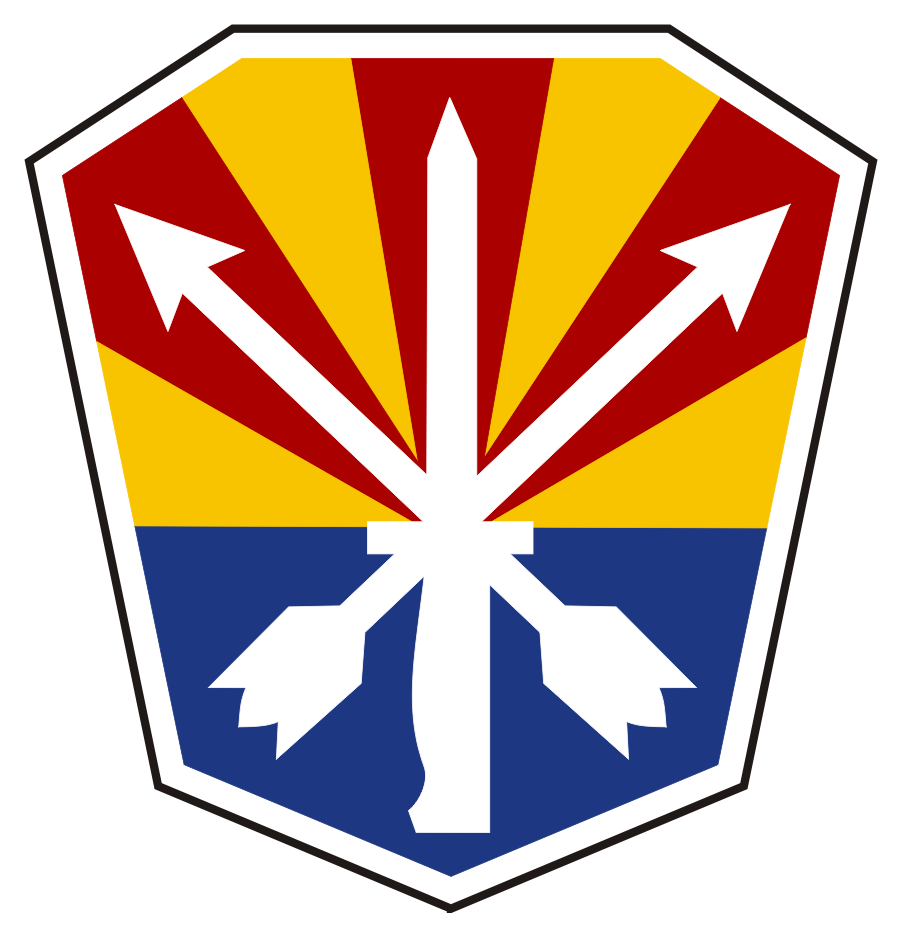
- Shoulder sleeve insignia of the Arizona Army National Guard Element, Joint Forces Headquarters

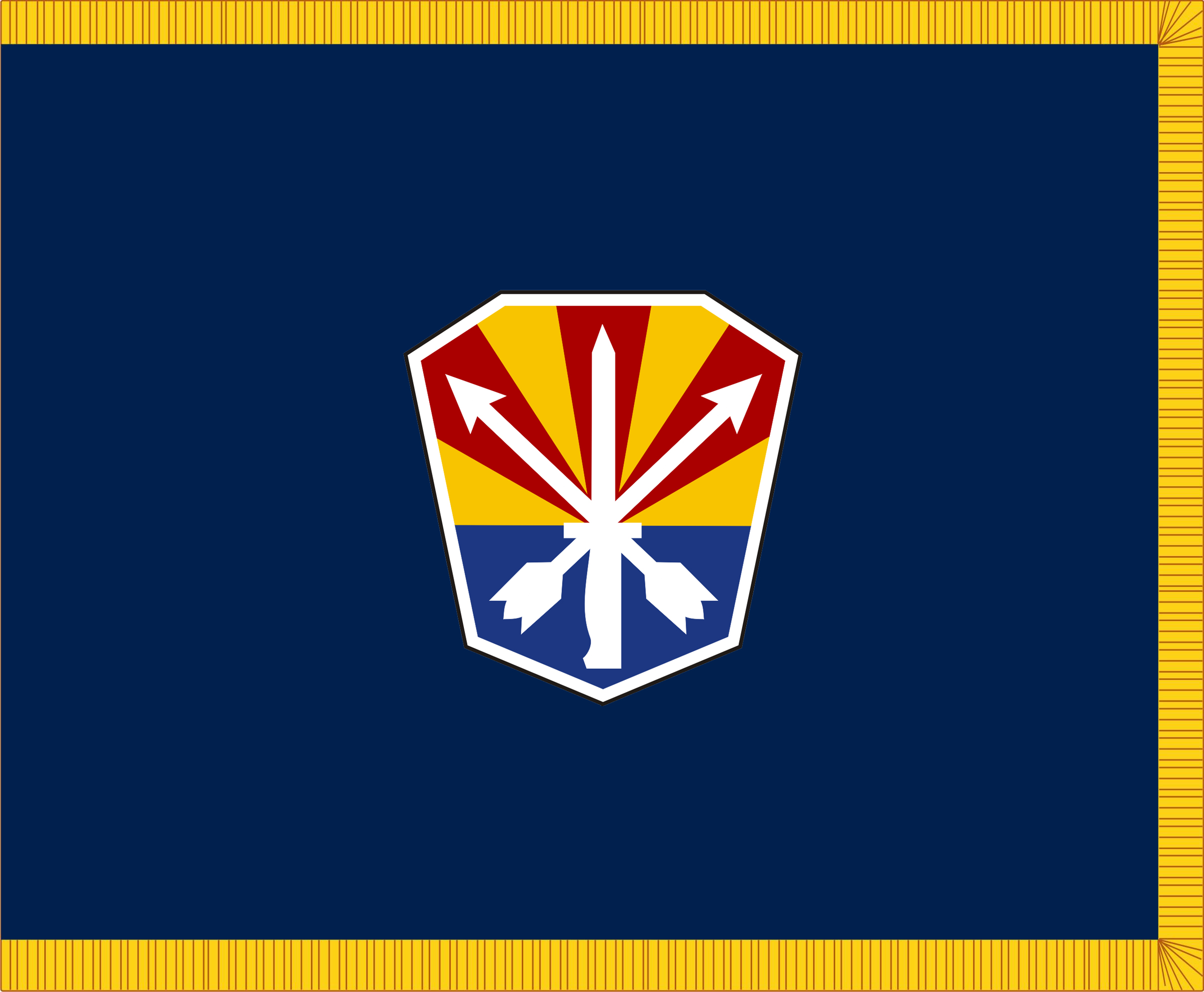
- Flag of the Arizona Army National Guard Element, Joint Forces Headquarters

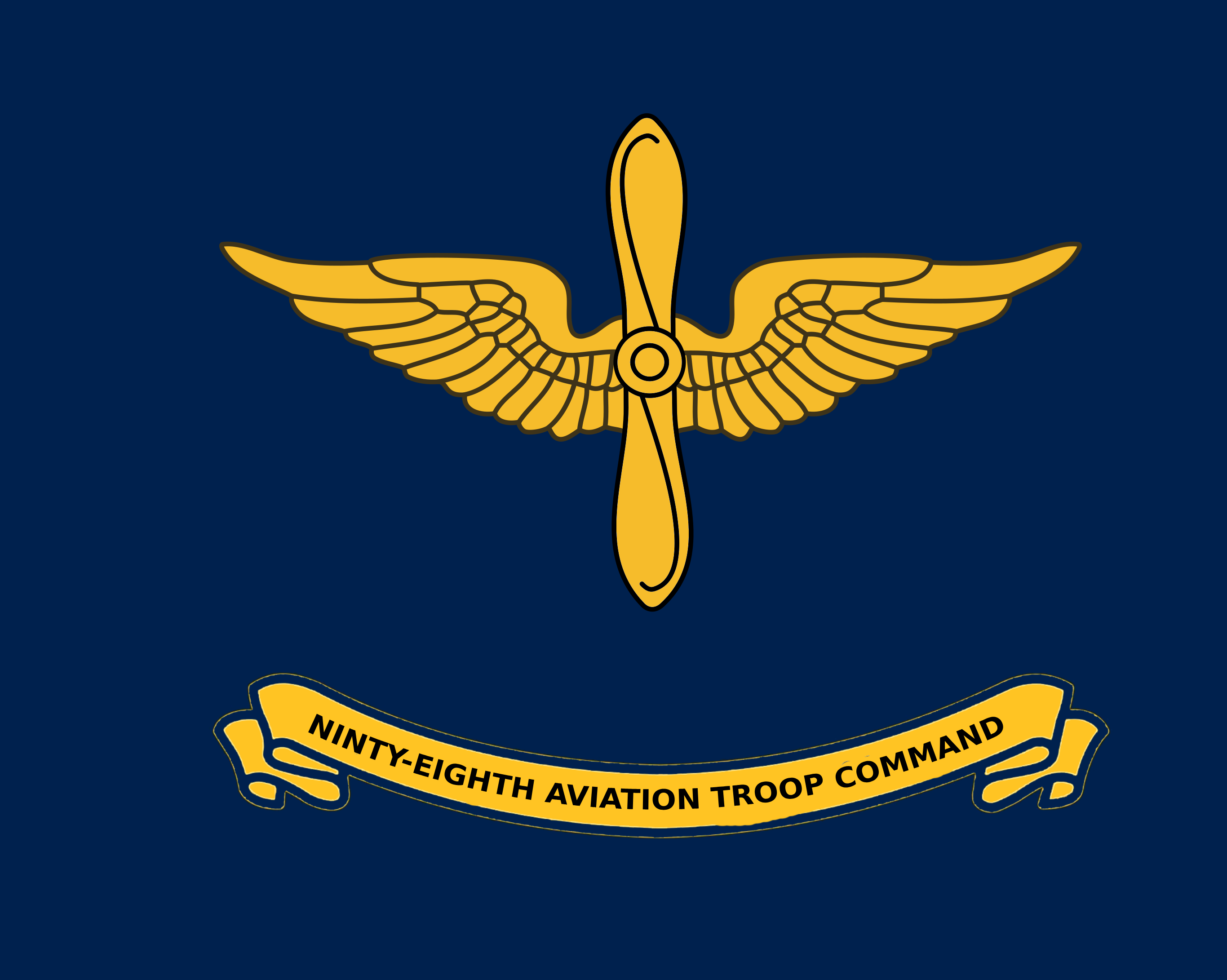
- Flag of the 98th Aviation Troop Command AZNG

The Arizona Army National Guard is a component of the United States Army and the United States National Guard. National coordination of various state National Guard units are maintained through the National Guard Bureau.

Arizona Army National Guard units are trained and equipped as part of the United States Army. The same ranks and insignia are used and National Guardsmen are eligible to receive all United States military awards. The Arizona National Guard also bestows a number of state awards for local services rendered in or to the state of Arizona.

As of 2026, there are approximately 5,100 soldiers serving in the Arizona Army Guard.

== History ==
In response to the Indian wars, the Arizona Army National Guard was formed on September 2, 1865. In 1898, hundreds of Arizonans joined the ranks of the Rough Riders during the Spanish–American War. The Militia Act of 1903 organized the various state militias into the present National Guard system.

Since then, the Arizona Army National Guard has been deployed to Korea, Vietnam, Iraq, and Afghanistan. Units from Arizona also deployed to Louisiana to assist with the Hurricane Katrina aftermath.

The 158th Infantry Regiment was created September 2, 1865, as the First Arizona Volunteer Infantry. Subsequent to Pancho Villa's murder of American civilians and soldiers in Columbus, New Mexico in 1916, the 1st Arizona Infantry was activated and headquartered at Camp Naco, Arizona and assigned border protection duties.

The regiment was drafted into Federal Service for World War I, 5 August 1917 as part of the 40th Infantry Division. Reorganization after the 1st World War assigned the 158th Infantry to the 45th Infantry Division. On 16 September 1940, the declaration of the National Emergency, the 158th Infantry joined its parent organization, the 45th Division at Fort Sill, Oklahoma. After being relieved by divisions in campaign after campaign across the Pacific, the 158th Infantry was selected to spearhead the final invasion of Japan.

Units from Arizona were called into action on September 26, 1940. The 158th Regimental Combat Team were given the name the "Bushmasters," named after the deadly Bushmaster snake in Panama. General Douglas MacArthur said, "No greater fighting combat team has ever deployed for battle."

The 158th Infantry was demobilized and returned to state service following the end of World War II. It was redesignated in June 1967 as the 258th Infantry Brigade. It was subsequently reorganized and redesignated in August 1968 as the 258th Military Police Brigade. In August 1976 the unit was reorganized and redesignated as the 258th Support Center, later the 258th Rear Area Operations Center. The Cannon Company, 158th Infantry was reorganized as the 153d Field Artillery Brigade (including units of the 180th Field Artillery Regiment).

With implementation of the Arizona Army National Guard Aviation Force Modernization Program on 1 October 1986, it was planned that Army Aviation units in Arizona would restructure to a Combat Aviation Group, one Attack Helicopter Battalion, and a Combat Aviation Company. The 385th Combat Aviation Group was to be the Command and Control Headquarters for the 551st Aviation Battalion in Arizona, the 419th Aviation Battalion in Florida (see 111th Aviation Regiment), and the 437th Aviation Battalion in Arkansas. The Group was to provide Command Staff Planning and Control of operations of assigned units in support of III Corps, Fort Hood, Texas. The Combat Aviation Company was planned to be part of the 135th Combat Aviation Battalion in Kansas to support I Corps, Fort Lewis, Washington.

The 153d FA Brigade was reorganized and redesignated as the 98th Troop command in 2006. In September 2010 the unit was reorganized and redesignated as the 158th Maneuver Enhanced Brigade. The 1st Battalion, 180th Field Artillery Regiment was reorganized and redesignated in 2006 as the 1st Battalion, 158th Infantry Regiment and assigned as an element of the 29th Infantry Brigade Combat Team (HI ARNG).

The official national motto of the Army National Guard is "Always Ready, Always There". Like the majority of all 54 states and territories, the Arizona Army National Guard has its own official motto "Protecting What Matters".

== Duties ==
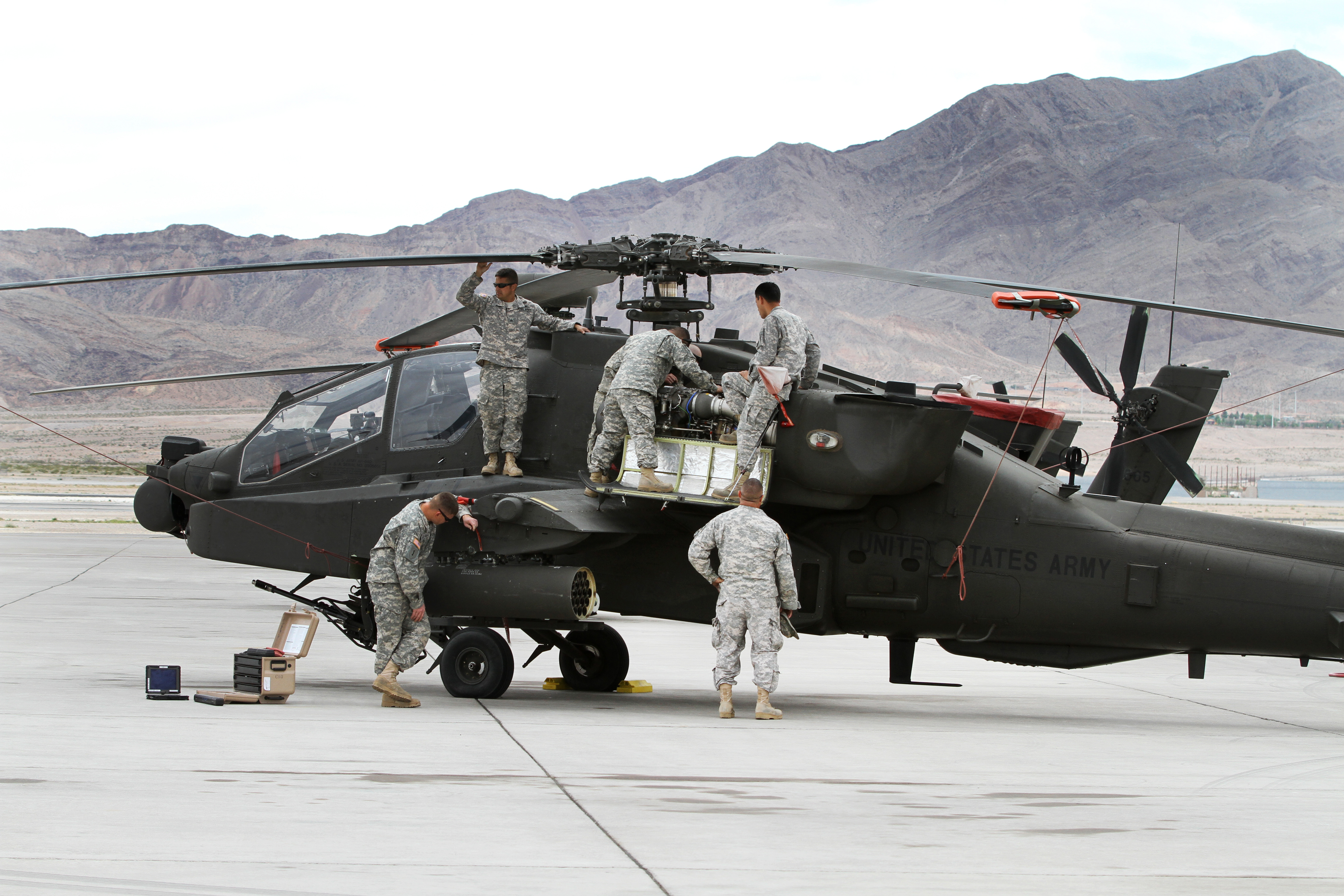
Arizona Army National Guardsmen working on an AH-64 Apache

National Guard units can be mobilized at any time by presidential order to supplement regular armed forces, and upon declaration of a state of emergency by the governor of the state in which they serve. Unlike Army Reserve troops, Arizona Army National Guard Soldiers cannot be mobilized individually (except through voluntary transfers or approved temporary duty assignments), but only as part of their respective units.

=== Active duty callups ===
For much of the final decades of the twentieth century, National Guard personnel typically served "One weekend a month, two weeks a year", with a portion working for the Guard in a full-time capacity. The current forces formation plans of the US Army call for the typical National Guard unit (or National Guardsman) to serve one year of active duty for every three years of service. More specifically, current Department of Defense policy is that no Guardsman will be involuntarily activated for a total of more than 24 months (cumulative) in one six-year enlistment period (this policy is due to change 1 August 2007, the new policy states that soldiers will be given 24 months between deployments of no more than 24 months, individual states have differing policies).

== Organization ==
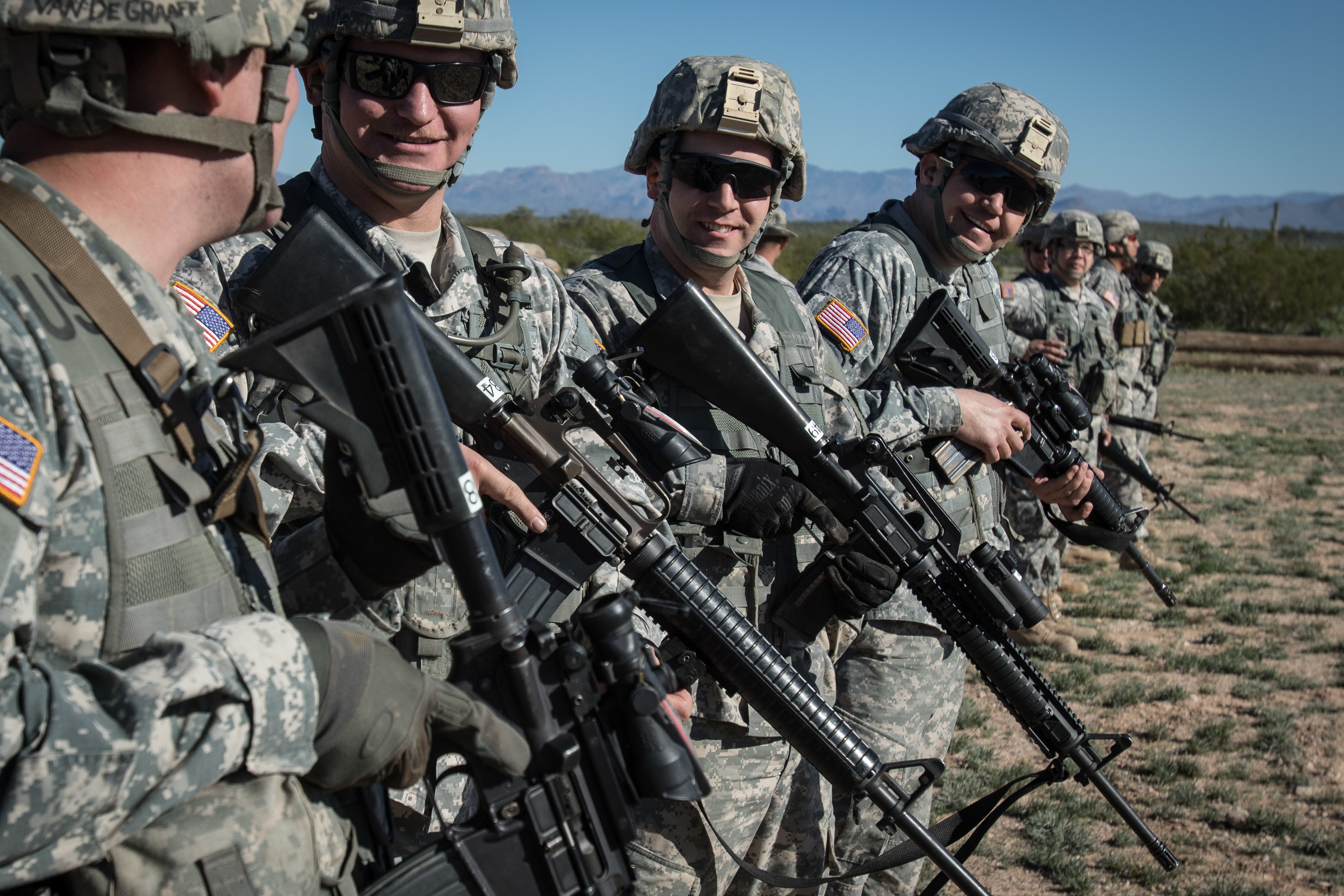
Arizona Army National Guardsmen from Alpha Company, 422nd Expeditionary Signal Battalion

As of January 2026 the Arizona Army National Guard consists of the following units:

- Joint Force Headquarters-Arizona, Army Element, at Papago Park Military Reservation
  - Headquarters and Headquarters Company, Joint Force Headquarters-Arizona, Army Element, at Papago Park Military Reservation
  - Arizona Recruiting & Retention Battalion, at Papago Park Military Reservation
  - Arizona Medical Detachment, at Papago Park Military Reservation
  - Western Army National Guard Aviation Training Site, at Silverbell Army Heliport
  - 91st Civil Support Team (WMD), at Papago Park Military Reservation
  - 123rd Mobile Public Affairs Detachment, at Papago Park Military Reservation
  - 180th Electronic Warfare Company, at Papago Park Military Reservation (forming)
  - Army Aviation Support Facility #1, at Papago Army Heliport
  - Army Aviation Support Facility #2, at Silverbell Army Heliport
  - Unit Training Equipment Site #1, at Florence Military Reservation
  - Combined Support Maintenance Shop #1, at Papago Park Military Reservation
  - Field Maintenance Shop #1, at Papago Park Military Reservation
  - Field Maintenance Shop #3, at Silverbell Army Heliport
  - Field Maintenance Shop #4, at Florence Military Reservation
  - Field Maintenance Shop #6, at Camp Navajo
  - Field Maintenance Shop #7, at Papago Park Military Reservation
  - Field Maintenance Shop #8, in Valencia
  - Camp Navajo Training Center, in Bellemont
    - Range Operations Section, at Camp Navajo
    - Range Operations Section, at Florence Military Reservation
    - 194th Engineer Detachment (Fire Fighting Team — Fire Truck), at Camp Navajo
  - 48th Ordnance Group (EOD), at Papago Park Military Reservation
    - Headquarters and Headquarters Company, 48th Ordnance Group (EOD), at Papago Park Military Reservation
    - 157th Ordnance Battalion (EOD), at Papago Park Military Reservation
      - Headquarters and Headquarters Detachment, 157th Ordnance Battalion (EOD), at Papago Park Military Reservation
      - 361st Ordnance Company (EOD), at Papago Park Military Reservation
      - 363rd Ordnance Company (EOD), in Coolidge (part of 741st Ordnance Battalion (EOD))
      - 1003rd Ordnance Company (EOD), in Glendale
  - 98th Aviation Troop Command, at Papago Army Heliport
    - Headquarters and Headquarters Company, 98th Aviation Troop Command, at Papago Army Heliport
    - Company F (ATS), 1st Battalion (General Support Aviation), 168th Aviation Regiment, at Papago Army Heliport (part of 40th Combat Aviation Brigade)
      - Detachment 6, Company E (Forward Support), 1st Battalion (General Support Aviation), 168th Aviation Regiment, at Papago Army Heliport
    - Detachment 4, Company A, 2nd Battalion (Fixed Wing), 641st Aviation Regiment (Detachment 31, Operational Support Airlift Activity), at Goldwater Air National Guard Base (C-26E Metroliner)
    - Detachment 1, Company D (Military Intelligence), 227th Brigade Engineer Battalion, at Fort Huachuca (RQ-28A UAV) (part of 29th Infantry Brigade Combat Team)
    - 260th Engineer Detachment (Fire Fighting Team — Fire Truck), in Florence
    - 2nd Battalion (Assault), 285th Aviation Regiment, at Papago Army Heliport (part of 77th Combat Aviation Brigade)
      - Headquarters and Headquarters Company, 2nd Battalion (Assault), 285th Aviation Regiment, at Papago Army Heliport
        - Detachment 1, Headquarters and Headquarters Company, 2nd Battalion (Assault), 285th Aviation Regiment, at Bismarck Airport (ND) — (North Dakota Army National Guard)
      - Company A, 2nd Battalion (Assault), 285th Aviation Regiment, at Papago Army Heliport (UH-60M Black Hawk)
      - Company B, 2nd Battalion (Assault), 285th Aviation Regiment, at Papago Army Heliport (UH-60M Black Hawk)
      - Company C, 2nd Battalion (Assault), 285th Aviation Regiment, at Bismarck Airport (ND) (UH-60M Black Hawk) — (North Dakota Army National Guard)
      - Company D (AVUM), 2nd Battalion (Assault), 285th Aviation Regiment, at Papago Army Heliport
        - Detachment 1, Company D (AVUM), 2nd Battalion (Assault), 285th Aviation Regiment, at Bismarck Airport (ND) — (North Dakota Army National Guard)
      - Company E (Forward Support), 2nd Battalion (Assault), 285th Aviation Regiment, at Papago Army Heliport
        - Detachment 1, Company E (Forward Support), 2nd Battalion (Assault), 285th Aviation Regiment, at Bismarck Airport (ND) — (North Dakota Army National Guard)
      - Company B, 3rd Battalion (Security & Support), 140th Aviation Regiment, at Silverbell Army Heliport (UH-72A Lakota) (part of 40th Combat Aviation Brigade)
      - Detachment 1, Company C (MEDEVAC), 2nd Battalion (General Support Aviation), 149th Aviation Regiment, at Silverbell Army Heliport (HH-60M Black Hawk)
        - Detachment 4, Company D (AVUM), 2nd Battalion (General Support Aviation), 149th Aviation Regiment, at Silverbell Army Heliport (AZ)
        - Detachment 4, Company E (Forward Support), 2nd Battalion (General Support Aviation), 149th Aviation Regiment, at Silverbell Army Heliport (AZ)
      - Detachment 2, Company C (MEDEVAC), 2nd Battalion (General Support Aviation), 149th Aviation Regiment, at Papago Army Heliport (HH-60M Black Hawk)
        - Detachment 5, Company D (AVUM), 2nd Battalion (General Support Aviation), 149th Aviation Regiment, at Papago Army Heliport (AZ)
        - Detachment 5, Company E (Forward Support), 2nd Battalion (General Support Aviation), 149th Aviation Regiment, at Papago Army Heliport (AZ)
      - Detachment 1, Company B (AVIM), 640th Aviation Support Battalion, at Silverbell Army Heliport (part of 40th Combat Aviation Brigade)
    - 1120th Transportation Battalion (Motor), in Glendale
      - Headquarters and Headquarters Detachment, 1120th Transportation Battalion (Motor), in Glendale
      - 222nd Transportation Company (Medium Truck) (Cargo), in Chandler
        - Detachment 1, 222nd Transportation Company (Medium Truck) (Cargo), in Flagstaff
      - 1404th Transportation Company (Medium Truck) (PLS), at Camp Navajo
        - Detachment 1, 1404th Transportation Company (Medium Truck) (PLS), in Show Low
      - 2220th Transportation Company (Medium Truck) (Cargo), in Tucson
        - Detachment 1, 2220th Transportation Company (Medium Truck) (Cargo), in Douglas
  - 158th Maneuver Enhancement Brigade, at Papago Park Military Reservation
    - Headquarters Support Company, 158th Maneuver Enhancement Brigade, at Papago Park Military Reservation
    - 365th Signal Company, at Papago Park Military Reservation
    - 1st Battalion, 158th Infantry Regiment, at Papago Park Military Reservation (part of 29th Infantry Brigade Combat Team)
      - Headquarters and Headquarters Company, 1st Battalion, 158th Infantry Regiment, at Papago Park Military Reservation
      - Company A, 1st Battalion, 158th Infantry Regiment, in Tucson
      - Company B, 1st Battalion, 158th Infantry Regiment, in Florence
      - Company C, 1st Battalion, 158th Infantry Regiment, in Prescott
      - Company D (Weapons), 1st Battalion, 158th Infantry Regiment, in Buckeye
      - Company G (Forward Support), 29th Brigade Support Battalion, in Mesa
    - 253rd Engineer Battalion, in Florence
      - Headquarters and Headquarters Company, 253rd Engineer Battalion, in Florence
      - Forward Support Company, 253rd Engineer Battalion, in Florence
      - 257th Engineer Detachment (Well Drilling), at Camp Navajo
      - 258th Engineer Company (Engineer Construction Company), in Safford
      - 259th Engineer Platoon (Quarry), at Camp Navajo
      - 262nd Engineer Detachment (Asphalt), at Camp Navajo
      - 263rd Engineer Detachment (Concrete), at Camp Navajo
      - 819th Combat Engineer Company Armored (CEC-A), in Florence
    - 850th Military Police Battalion, at Papago Park Military Reservation
      - Headquarters and Headquarters Detachment, 850th Military Police Battalion, at Papago Park Military Reservation
      - 855th Military Police Company (Combat Support), at Papago Park Military Reservation
      - 856th Military Police Company (Combat Support), at Camp Navajo
        - Detachment 1, 856th Military Police Company (Combat Support), in Prescott
      - 860th Military Police Company (Combat Support), in Tucson
  - 198th Regional Support Group, at Papago Park Military Reservation
    - Headquarters and Headquarters Detachment, 198th Regional Support Group, at Papago Park Military Reservation
    - 153rd Combat Sustainment Support Battalion, at Papago Park Military Reservation
      - Headquarters and Headquarters Company, 153rd Combat Sustainment Support Battalion, at Papago Park Military Reservation
      - 159th Financial Management Support Detachment, at Papago Park Military Reservation
      - 905th Quartermaster Platoon (Field Feeding), at Papago Park Military Reservation
      - 996th Medical Company (Area Support), in Tempe
      - 1348th Ordnance Company (Support Maintenance), at Papago Park Military Reservation
    - 158th Combat Sustainment Support Battalion, in Tucson
      - Headquarters and Headquarters Company, 158th Combat Sustainment Support Battalion, in Tucson
      - 108th Army Band, at Papago Park Military Reservation
      - 160th Financial Management Support Detachment, at Papago Park Military Reservation
      - 448th Signal Company (Tactical Installation/Networking), in Casa Grande (part of 422nd Expeditionary Signal Battalion-Enhanced)
      - 913th Quartermaster Platoon (Field Feeding), in Tucson
      - 3666th Ordnance Company (Support Maintenance), in Tucson
  - 215th Regiment, Regional Training Institute, at Papago Park Military Reservation
    - Officer Candidate School
    - Warrant Officer Candidate School
    - Military Police Transition Company
    - Multi-functional Training Company

Aviation unit abbreviations: MEDEVAC — Medical evacuation; AVUM — Aviation Unit Maintenance; AVIM — Aviation Intermediate Maintenance; ATS — Air Traffic Service

== See also ==
- State defense force
- Militia
- Camp Naco, Arizona
- List of armored and cavalry regiments of the United States Army
