= 48th Ordnance Group (EOD) =

48th Explosive Ordnance Group
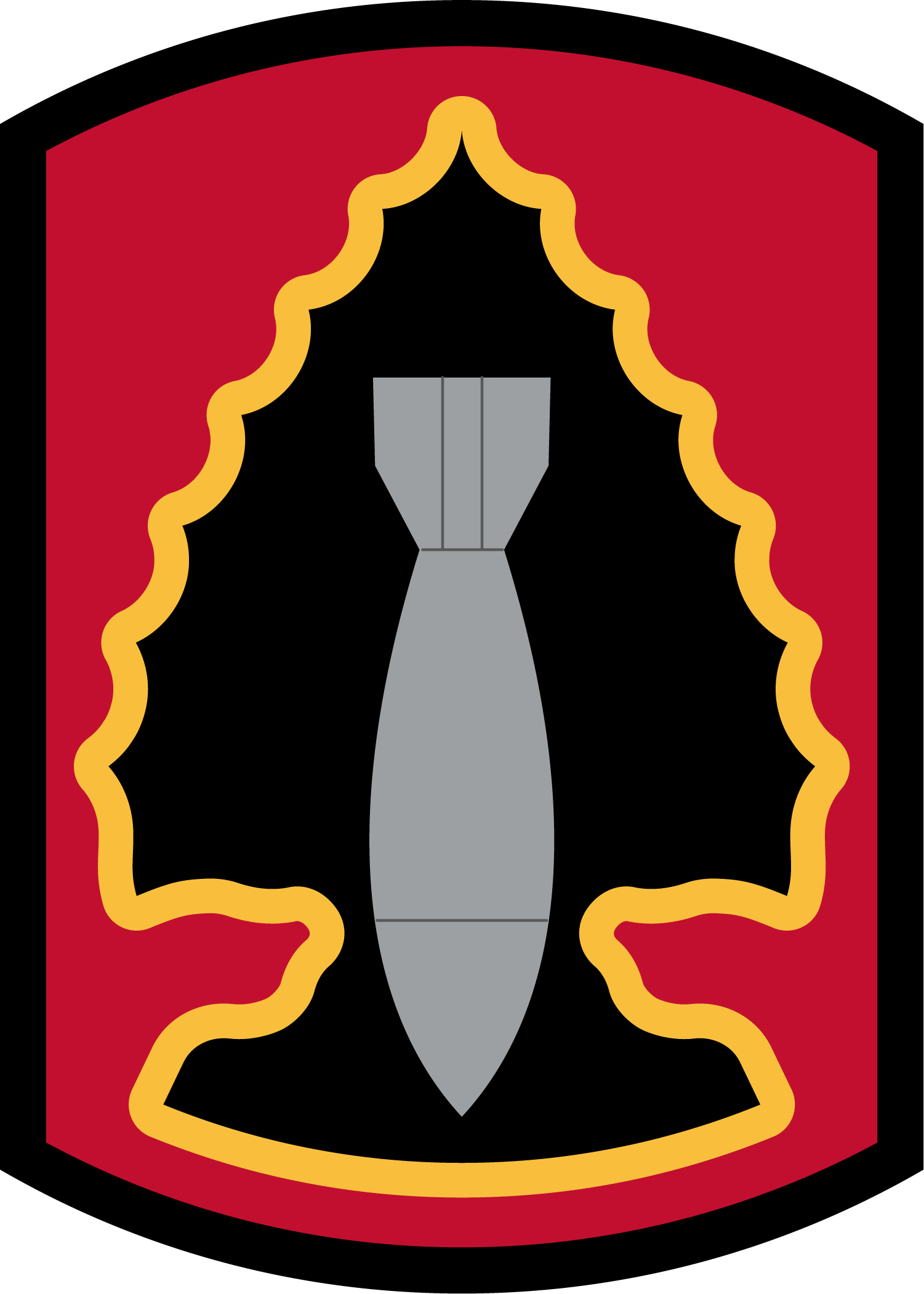
- Active: 2023-present
- Country: United States
- Allegiance: Arizona
- Branch: Army National Guard
- Role: Explosive Ordnance Disposal
- Part of: Arizona Army National Guard
- Garrison/HQ: Papago Park Military Reservation, Phoenix, Arizona
- Motto: It Pays To Win

Commanders
- Current commander: Col. Nathaniel T. Panka
- Command Sergeant Major: CSM Michael G. Lamme

48th Ordnance Group (EOD) is the only EOD group in the Army National Guard, stationed at Papago Park Military Reservation in Phoenix, Arizona. Their core mission is to eliminate and/or reduce chemical, biological, radiological, nuclear, and explosive (CBRNE) hazards, including Improvised Explosive Devices (IEDs) and conventional US and foreign Unexploded Ordnance (UXO).

The unit was activated on 15 February 2023.

== Organization ==
48th Ordnance Group (EOD) Arizona ARNG (Phoenix, AZ)

157th Ordnance Battalion (EOD) Arizona ARNG (Phoenix, AZ)

- 202nd Ordnance Company (EOD) — Georgia ARNG (Waynesboro, GA)
- 221st Ordnance Company (EOD) — Florida ARNG (Camp Blanding, FL)
- 361st Ordnance Company (EOD) — Arizona ARNG (Phoenix, AZ)
- 387th Ordnance Company (EOD) — Massachusetts ARNG (Camp Edwards, MA)
- 430th Ordnance Company (EOD) — North Carolina ARNG (Washington, NC)
- 745th Ordnance Company (EOD) — Michigan ARNG (Camp Grayling, MI)
- 753rd Ordnance Company (EOD) — West Virginia ARNG (Camp Dawson, WV)
- 1003rd Ordnance Company (EOD) — Arizona ARNG (Phoenix, AZ)
- 1600th Ordnance Company (EOD) — Puerto Rico ARNG (Camp Santiago, PR)

501st Ordnance Battalion (EOD) New York ARNG (Newburgh, NY)

- 1108th Ordnance Company (EOD) — New York ARNG (Glenville, NY)

741st Ordnance Battalion (EOD) Washington ARNG (Tacoma, WA)

- 217th Ordnance Company (EOD) — California ARNG (Camp Roberts, CA)
- 319th Ordnance Company (EOD) — Washington ARNG (Pasco, WA)
- 363rd Ordnance Company (EOD) — Arizona ARNG (Phoenix, AZ)
- 3665th Ordnance Company (EOD) — Nevada ARNG (Las Vegas, NV)
