= 141st =

141st is the ordinal form of the number 141. 141st or One hundred and forty-first may also refer to:

- A fraction, 1/141, equal to one of 141 equal parts

== Geography ==
- 141st meridian east, a line of longitude
- 141st meridian west, a line of longitude

== Military ==
- 141st Brigade (disambiguation)
- 141st Division (disambiguation)
- 141st Regiment (disambiguation)

== See also ==
- May 21, 141st day of the year in a standard year
