= 387th Division =

387th Division may refer to:

- 387th Infantry Division, Wehrmacht, Germany
- 387th Rifle Division, Soviet Union

== See also ==
- List of military divisions by number
- 387th (disambiguation)
