= 141st Brigade =

141st Brigade may refer to:

- 141st Mixed Brigade, Spain
- 141st Mechanized Brigade, Ukraine
- 141st (5th London) Brigade, United Kingdom
- 141st Maneuver Enhancement Brigade, United States

== See also ==
- 141st Division (disambiguation)
- 141st Regiment (disambiguation)
