= 285th Regiment =

285th Regiment may refer to:

- 285th Aviation Regiment, United States
- 285th (Essex) Parachute Field Regiment Royal Artillery
