= List of flags of North Dakota =

This list of flags of North Dakota includes the state flag, the governor's flag, flags of units of the North Dakota Army National Guard, the flag of Bismarck, historical flags used in what is now North Dakota, and proposed state flags. The current state flag, adopted in 1911, features an eagle bearing a shield, arrows, an olive branch, and scrolls on a blue field; the list also includes historical flags used at Pembina and state flag proposals from 1909 and 1952.

== State flag ==
Flag	Date	Use	Description
	1911–present	State and civil flag	On a blue field, an eagle with outspread wings and opened beak, the left foot grasping a sheaf of seven arrows and the right foot grasping an olive branch showing three red berries. On the breast of the eagle is displayed a shield, the lower part showing seven red and six white stripes placed alternately, with a blue chief at the top. Through the open beak of the eagle passes a red scroll bearing the words "E Pluribus Unum" in gold letters. Beneath the eagle is a red scroll bearing the words "North Dakota" in white letters. Over the scroll carried through the eagle’s beak are thirteen gold five-pointed stars, arranged in two parallel arcs of seven and six, the whole device surmounted by a gold sunburst. 26:33 aspect ratio.
	1911–present	Governor's flag	Flag used by the governor. A green field with the Coat of arms of North Dakota charged in the middle, and four stars arranged in the corners of the flag.

== Military flags ==
Flag	Date	Use	Description
		North Dakota Army National Guard Headquarters	A blue field, defaced with the insignia of the North Dakota Army National Guard.
		North Dakota ARNG 68th Troop Command	A tricolor of blue-maize-blue, defaced with the insignia of the North Dakota Army National Guard.

== City flags ==
Flag	Date	Use	Description
		Flag of Bismarck	A horizontal white-red bicolor with a gold border, with the logo of Bismarck in the middle.

== Historic flags ==
Flag	Date	Use	Description
	1801	Flag of the North West Company	Flag used in what is now North Dakota's settlement of Pembina
		Flag of the Hudson's Bay Company	Flag used in what is now North Dakota's settlement of Pembina as Rupert's Land

== Proposed flags ==
Flag	Date	Use	Description
	1909	Proposed flag	
	1952	Proposed flag (by Clell Gannon)	A green field with a grain of wheat and a sunburst charged on the left and right of the flag, respectively.
