= 141st Division =

141st Division may refer to:

- 141st Reserve Division, Germany (Wehrmacht)
- 141st Rifle Division, Soviet Union (Red Army)

== See also ==
- List of military divisions by number
- 141st Brigade (disambiguation)
- 141st Regiment (disambiguation)
- 141st (disambiguation)
