= George M. Gould =

American physician and lexicographer

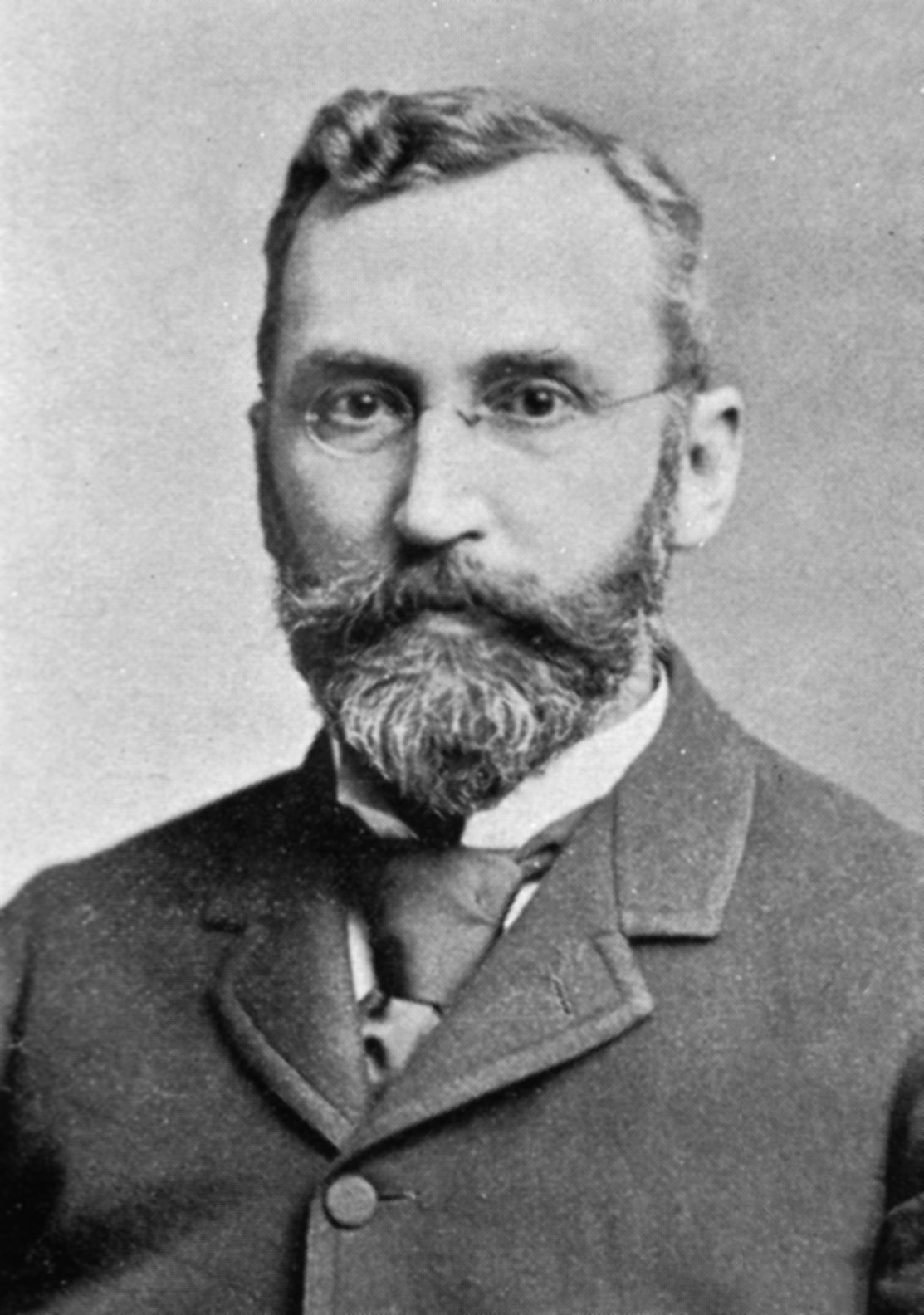

George Milbr(e)y Gould (November 8, 1848 in Auburn, Maine – August 8, 1922 in Atlantic City) was an American physician and lexicographer.

== Life ==
At 12 years, he enlisted and became a drummer boy in the American Civil War, serving in the 63rd Ohio Infantry (1861–2) and later in Company K, 141st Ohio Infantry during 1864.

After the war, he entered the Ohio Wesleyan University and received a Bachelor of Arts in 1873 and a Master of Arts in 1892. He also received the Phi Beta Kappa key. He graduated from Harvard Divinity School (1874) and worked as the owner of a bookstore. He entered Jefferson Medical College in 1885 and graduated in 1888. He then opened an Ophthalmology office in Philadelphia. During that time he invented the cemented bifocal lens.

He was the first president of the Association of Medical Librarians (now the Medical Library Association). He served from 1898 to 1901.

After twenty years of practice, he moved to Ithaca, New York and three years later to Atlantic City.

A collection of papers about his life are held at the National Library of Medicine in Bethesda, Maryland.

== Works ==
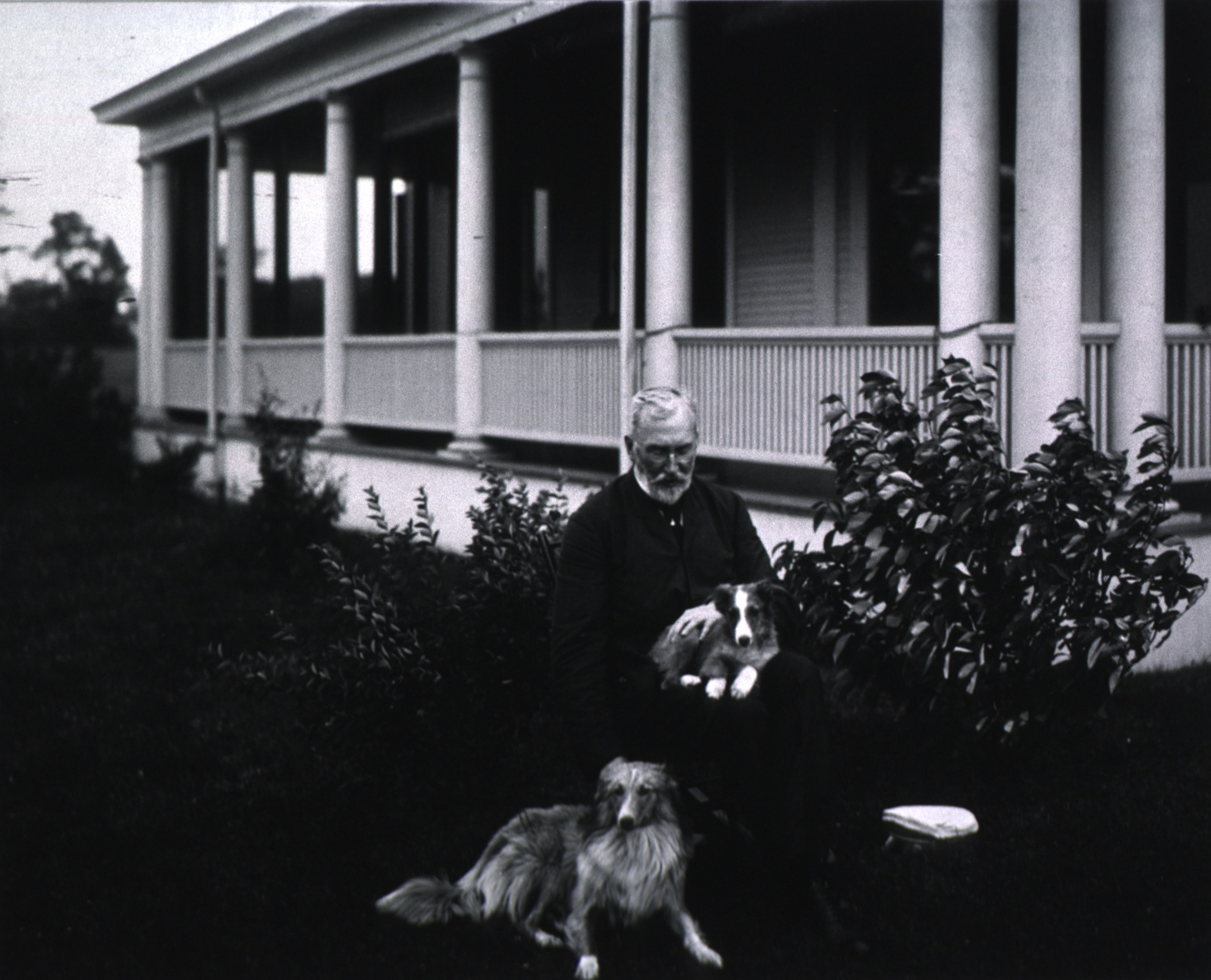
Gould, with dogs

- Students' Medical Dictionary
- A Pocket medical dictionary (1890)
- Anomalies and Curiosities of Medicine (with Walter Lytle Pyle) (1896)
- A book of poems (1897)
- Biographic Clinics (1903)-Volume I – The Origin of Ill Health of De Quincey, Carlyle, Darwin, Huxley and Browning
- Biographic Clinics (1904)-Volume II – The Origin of Ill Health of George Eliot, George Henry Lewes, Wagner, Parkman, Jane Welch Carlyle, Spencer, Whittier, Margaret Fuller Ossoli, and Nietzsche
- Biographic Clinics (1904)-Volume III – Influence of Visual Function Upon Health
- Concerning Lafcadio Hearn (with Laura Stedman) (1908)
- Righthandedness and lefthandedness (1908)
- The Practitioner's Medical Dictionary (with R J E Scott) (1910)
- The Infinite Presence (1910)
