= Flag of North Dakota =

U.S. state flag

North Dakota
- Use: Civil and state flag
- Proportion: 26:33
- Adopted: March 3, 1911 (standardized 1943)
- Design: On a blue field, an eagle with outspread wings and opened beak, the left foot grasping a sheaf of seven arrows and the right foot grasping an olive branch showing three red berries. On the breast of the eagle is displayed a shield, the lower part showing seven red and six white stripes placed alternately, with a blue chief at the top. Through the open beak of the eagle passes a red scroll bearing the words "E Pluribus Unum" in gold letters. Beneath the eagle is a red scroll bearing the words "North Dakota" in white letters. Over the scroll carried through the eagle’s beak are thirteen gold five-pointed stars, arranged in two parallel arcs of seven and six, the whole device surmounted by a gold sunburst.
- Flag of the Governor of North Dakota
- Use: State flag

The flag of North Dakota represents the U.S. state of North Dakota. Adopted on March 11, 1911, its design is an almost exact replica of the regimental banner carried by the state's troop contingent in the Philippine–American War (1899–1902), the only difference being that the unit designation inscribed on the scroll was replaced by the state's name.

== Design and specifications ==
=== Statute ===
The North Dakota Century Code specifies that the flag of North Dakota must:

consist of a field of blue silk or material which will withstand the elements four feet four inches [132.08 centimeters] on the pike and five feet six inches [167.64 centimeters] on the fly, with a border of knotted yellow fringe two and one‑half inches [6.35 centimeters] wide.

The statute further specifies that:

On each side of said flag in the center thereof, must be embroidered or stamped an eagle with outspread wings and with opened beak. The eagle must be three feet four inches [101.6 centimeters] from tip to tip of wing, and one foot ten inches [55.88 centimeters] from top of head to bottom of olive branch hereinafter described. The left foot of the eagle shall grasp a sheaf of arrows, the right foot shall grasp an olive branch showing three red berries. On the breast of the eagle must be displayed a shield, the lower part showing seven red and six white stripes placed alternately. Through the open beak of the eagle must pass a scroll bearing the words 'E Pluribus Unum'. Beneath the eagle there must be a scroll on which must be borne the words 'North Dakota'. Over the scroll carried through the eagle’s beak must be shown thirteen five‑pointed stars, the whole device being surmounted by a sunburst.

The statute continues by specifying that:

The flag must conform in all respects as to color, form, size, and device with the regimental flag carried by the First North Dakota Infantry in the Spanish American War and Philippine Insurrection, except in the words shown on the scroll below the eagle. To ensure historical accuracy, reproductions of the flag of North Dakota must adhere to the official design and industry color chart codes provided by the state historical society.

And in the concluding note that:

Flags purchased by a state entity or a political subdivision must substantially meet the requirements of this section. This section does not apply to the purchase of an item that is not a flag but which portrays a likeness of the flag of North Dakota, for example, a miniature flag, food, clothing, a lapel pin, a paper product, or other nonflag item.

=== Colors ===
Reproductions of the flag of North Dakota must adhere to the official design and industry color chart codes provided by the state historical society, designating the following color guide:

Name	Pantone	Usage on Flag
Gold	131 C	Scroll ornamentation; shield border on eagle; eagle iris; "E Pluribus Unum"; scroll border in eagle's beak; 13 stars; sunburst
Red	187 C	Scroll beneath eagle; shield stripes; eagle tongue; olive branch berries; scroll in eagle's beak
Yellow	1225 C	Eagle feet and beak
Brown	139 C	Shadows on eagle feet and beak
Green	356 C	Olive branch
Yellow-Green	384 C	Olive branch
Silver	409 C	Eagle claws; arrow shafts and points; tail feather coverts; wing coverts
Dark Brown	469 C	Arrow fletching and points; eagle thigh feathers; wing marginal coverts and alula
Light Tan	468 C	Tail feathers; arrow points; primaries and secondaries of wings; eagle neck and head
Medium Brown	1535 C	Arrow points; top feathers of marginal coverts and alula; eagle breast
Medium Blue	301 C	Chief on eagle's shield
White	White	Words "North Dakota" on scroll; shield stripes; eye reflection; top head feathers
Black	Black	Eagle pupil and nostril
Dark Blue (Flag Field)	654 C	Flag background

=== Design ===
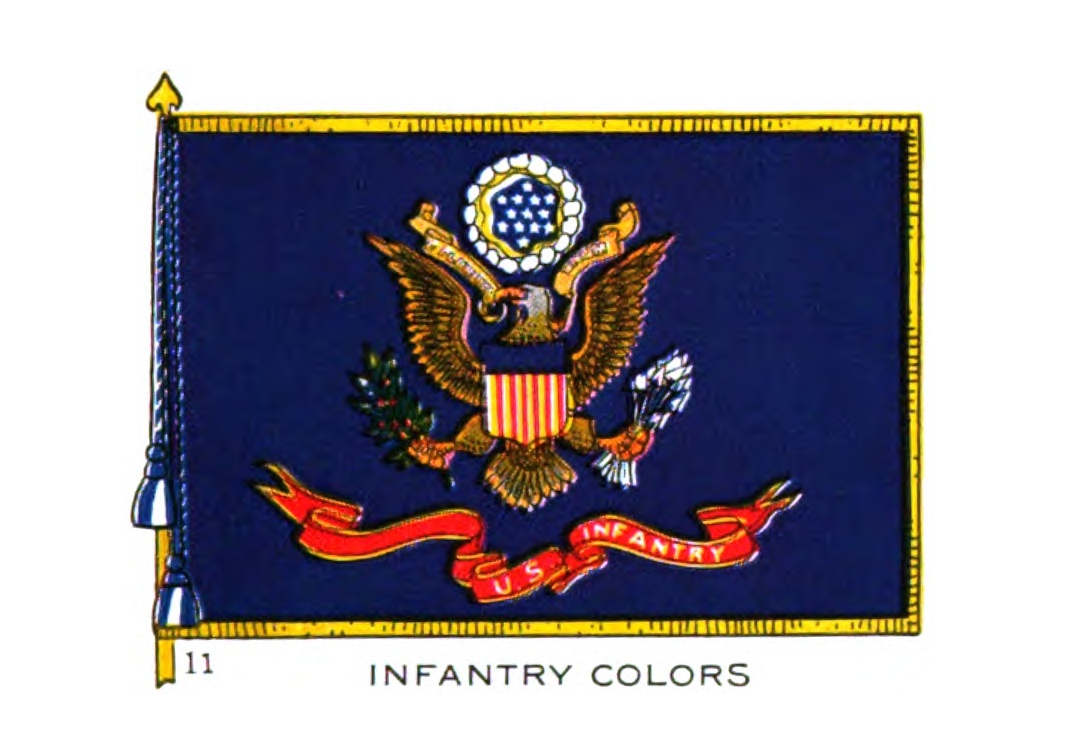
United States Infantry Colors as depicted in National Geographic, 1917

The flag's official proportions are 33:26, which is notably shorter than many other state flags. However, in practice, the flag is often produced and sold in 5:3 ratios.

According to state law, the design of the flag mirrors that of the First North Dakota Infantry's standard during the Spanish–American War and the Philippine–American War. This makes the flag similar to the greater coat of arms of the United States, and nearly identical to many other regimental standards, and current state flags.

A banner with the national coat of arms was carried by all infantry regiments from 1890 to 1904, with the sole distinction being the unit designation inscribed on the scroll underneath the coat of arms. The regimental colors of the North Dakotan troops, for instance, were adorned with the inscription "1st North Dakota Infantry".

It is one of nine U.S. state flags to feature an eagle, alongside those of Illinois, Iowa, Michigan, Missouri, New York, Oregon, Pennsylvania, and Wyoming.

== History ==
Proposed flag, per description

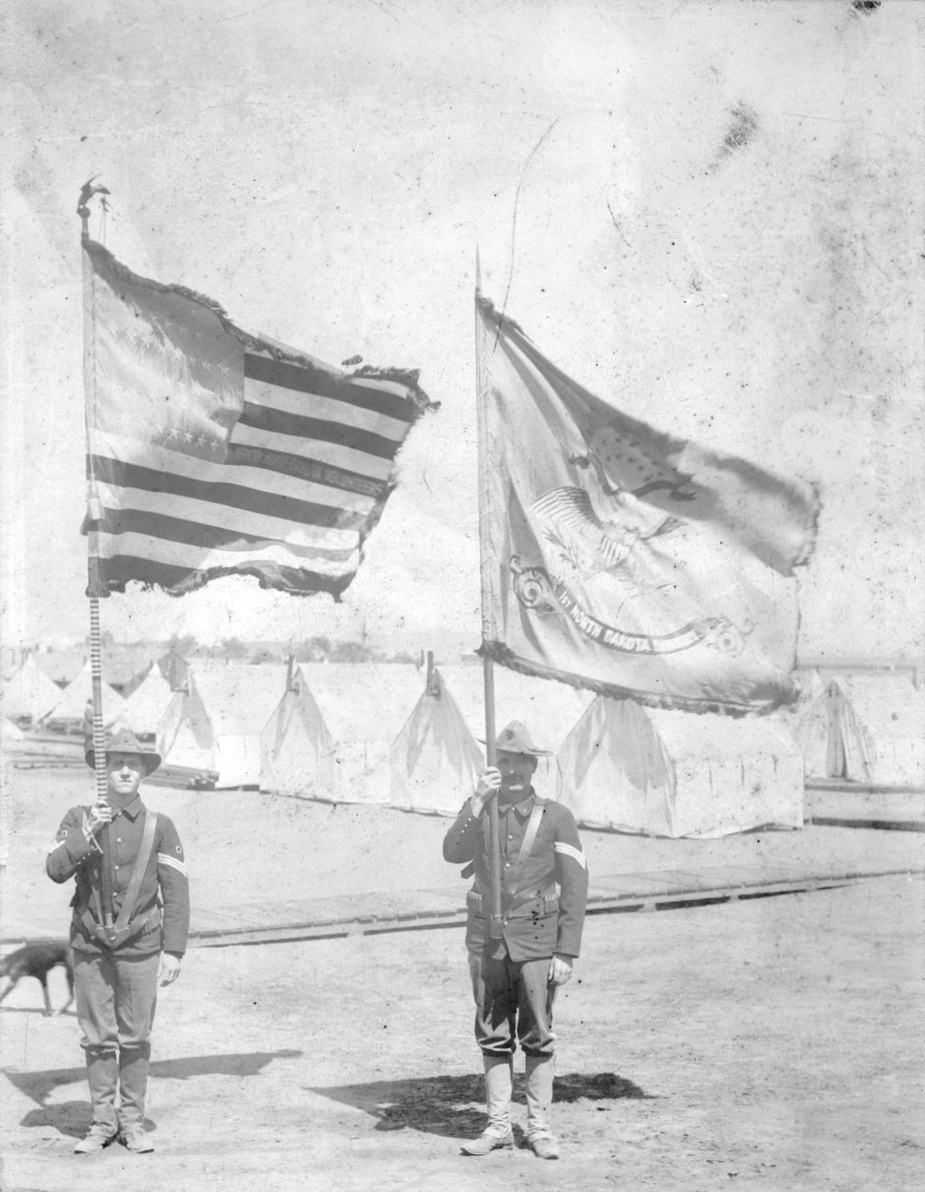
Two soldiers of the 1st North Dakota Infantry with regimental flags, Philippines, 1898

=== Pre-official flags (before 1911) ===
In 1889, members of a local temperance chapter made a state flag to be displayed at their personal booth during the Paris Exposition. It was again displayed at National temperance conference in Chicago . The flag was later sold for $10 ($356 adjusted for inflation). Its design is not known.

There was mention of "North Dakota banners" on display during the 1906 State Fair, but their design remains unknown. While the wording suggests they were in some way representative of or associated with the state, it's unclear whether they were flags, military banners, or something else entirely.

In early 1909 a committee was set up to select a design for a state flag. They received many proposals but on March 4, they sent the outline to the state legislative assembly. It was described as a white-bordered flag of 3:4 proportions, featuring three horizontal stripes: a blue stripe at the top, a wider white stripe in the center, and a red stripe at the bottom. In the center of the white stripe appeared the state seal, with the word "North" to its left, and "Dakota" to its right. In the center of the blue stripe, was a white star bearing the number 39, with the date "March 4" to the left of the star, and the year "1909" to the right. In the center of the red stripe was a golden bundle of grain with a prairie rose on each side.

On March 5, 1909 Mr. Fraine proposed a state flag consisting of a blue background with the state coat of arms in the center. The idea was immediately turned down by the house.

=== Current flag (1911–present) ===
Colonel John H. Fraine, a former officer who had commanded North Dakotan troops during the war, was serving as a Representative in the North Dakota Legislature in 1911. On January 21, 1911, he introduced House Bill No. 152 (H.B. 152), proposing that the flag carried by the First North Dakota Infantry Regiment be adopted as the official state flag.

The design was officially approved by the North Dakota Legislative Assembly on March 3, 1911, though the original legislation did not specify the flag’s precise colors or proportions. In 1943, additional legislation was enacted to more closely align the state flag's design with the original military banner it was based on.

== 1951 Flag Commission ==
The design recommended for adoption by the North Dakota State Flag Commission

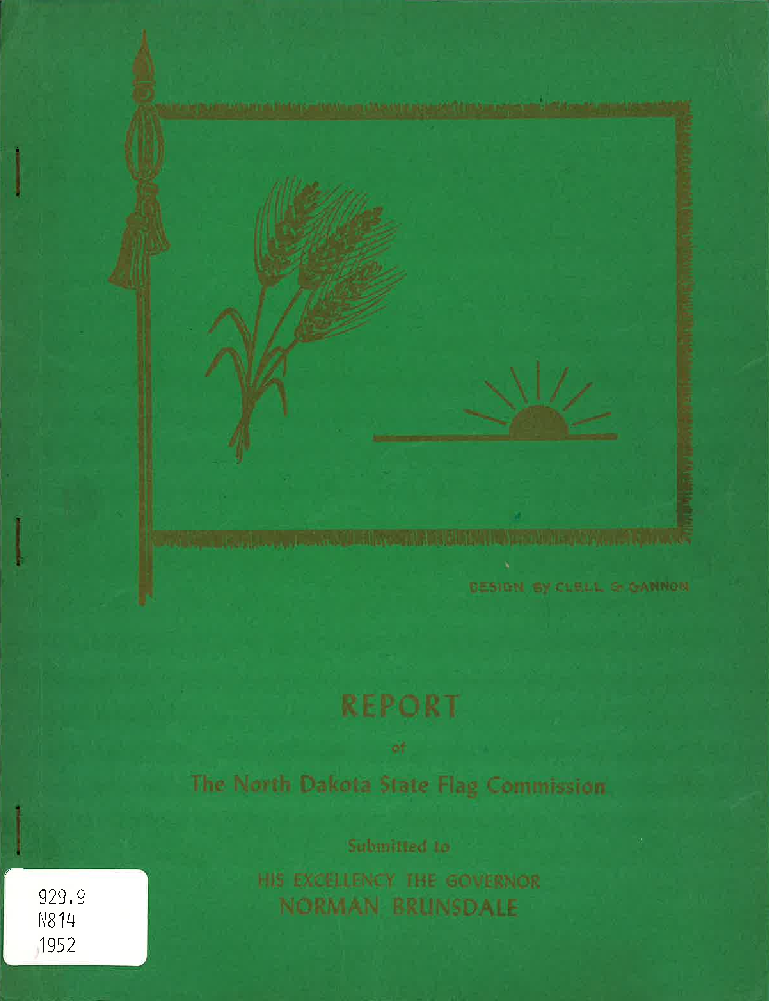
Front cover of the 1952 report of the North Dakota State Flag Commission

In 1951, the North Dakota State Flag Commission was established by S.B. No. 156 (1951 S.L., ch.303) to assess the flag's origins, dimensions, and its suitability as a symbol for North Dakota. Composed of five members appointed by the Governor, the commission operated until December 31, 1952.

While acknowledging flag's long-standing presence since 1911 and its association with North Dakota troops in historic conflicts, the commission noted that these factors alone did not inherently make it emblematic of the state. Despite minor variations, they deemed the flag too closely resembled the United States coat of arms, suggesting that its symbolism belonged to the entire nation rather than any individual state, and emphasized the importance of distinctiveness. In pursuit of a more fitting motif, the commission explored various avenues including historical figures, state nicknames, and indigenous symbols. However, each option presented challenges or lacked resonance with North Dakota's identity. Certain themes were deemed either historically inaccurate or too regionally specific. Here, the commission deemed the sources of symbolism that would later be used for the state's coat of arms as unsuitable, leaving only the color palette as a point of agreement.

Through a process of elimination, the commission arrived at wheat and sunset as the most suitable symbols for the state flag. Wheat, as the primary crop and symbol of North Dakota's agricultural heritage, represented the state's economic backbone. While the sunset exemplified the state's distinctive sunsets and natural beauty. The commission's recommendation ultimately resulted in a proposal: a green flag adorned with golden wheat stems and heads, accompanied by a radiant golden sunset. This design aimed to encapsulate the essence of the state's identity while adhering to principles of originality, symbolism, and simplicity, as outlined by the commission's thorough examination of flag design principles and historical context.

The proposed changes were ultimately met with resistance. S.B. No. 265, incorporating the commission's suggestions, was presented in the 1953 session but failed to pass.

== 1989 Centennial Flag ==
A flag was created by the North Dakota Centennial Commission in 1985, a few years ahead of the state's 1989 centennial celebration.

Set against a white background, the flag features the official centennial logo. At its center is a depiction of The Pioneer Family statue sculpted by Avard Fairbanks (showing pioneers standing atop the Badlands) beneath a vast blue sky. The scene looks out over a North Dakotan landscape with the Missouri River. The years “1889” and “1989” flank the circular graphic, while the words “NORTH DAKOTA CENTENNIAL” appear below, with CENTENNIAL rendered in a distinctive Old West-inspired font.

The logo was illustrated by Burdette B. Calkins, who described it as a tribute to North Dakota’s people and land symbolizing the state’s legacy of immigrant settlement, agricultural development, and enduring spirit.

== Gallery ==
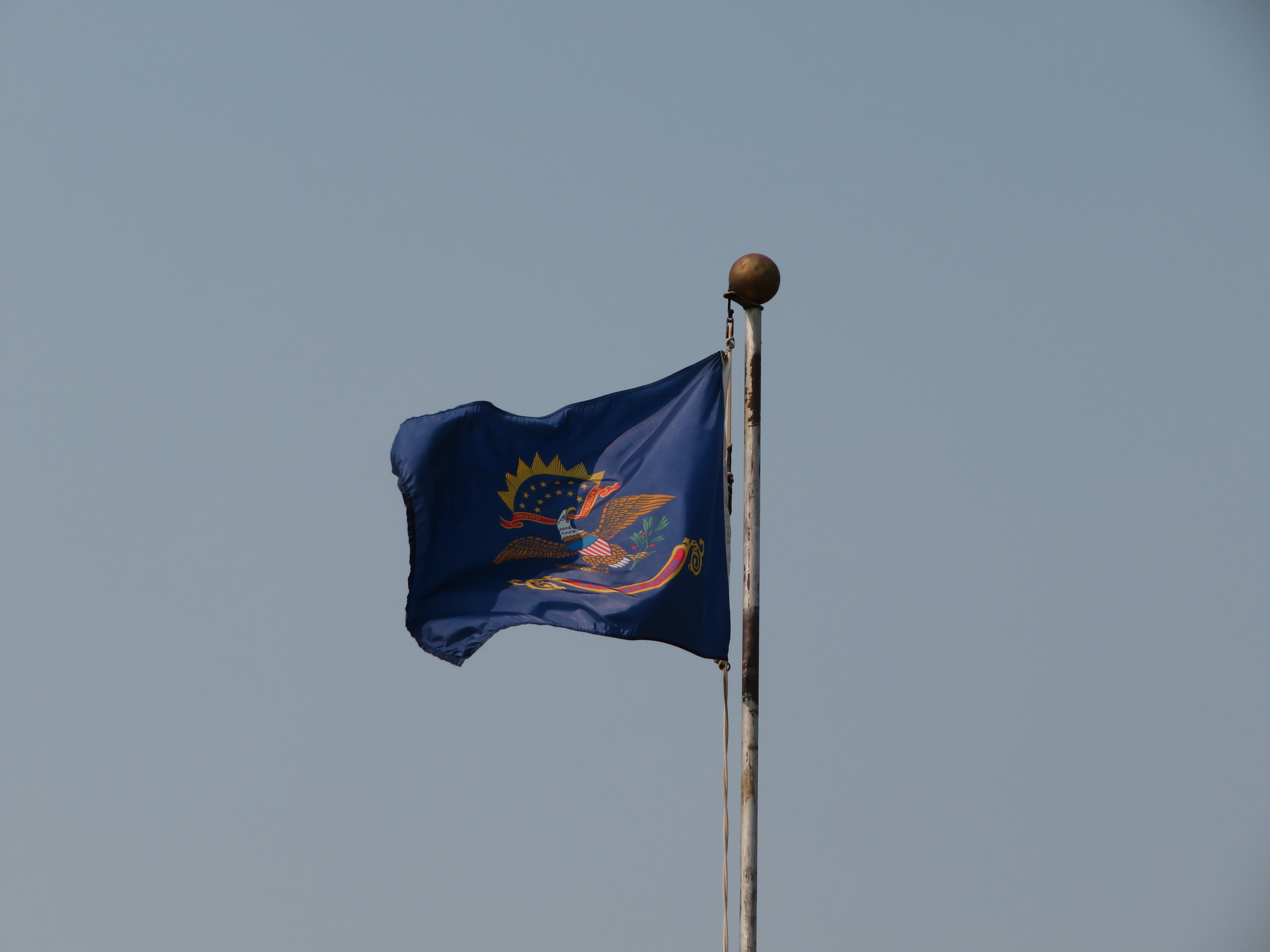
Flag of North Dakota at the International Peace Garden, North Dakota-Manitoba Border

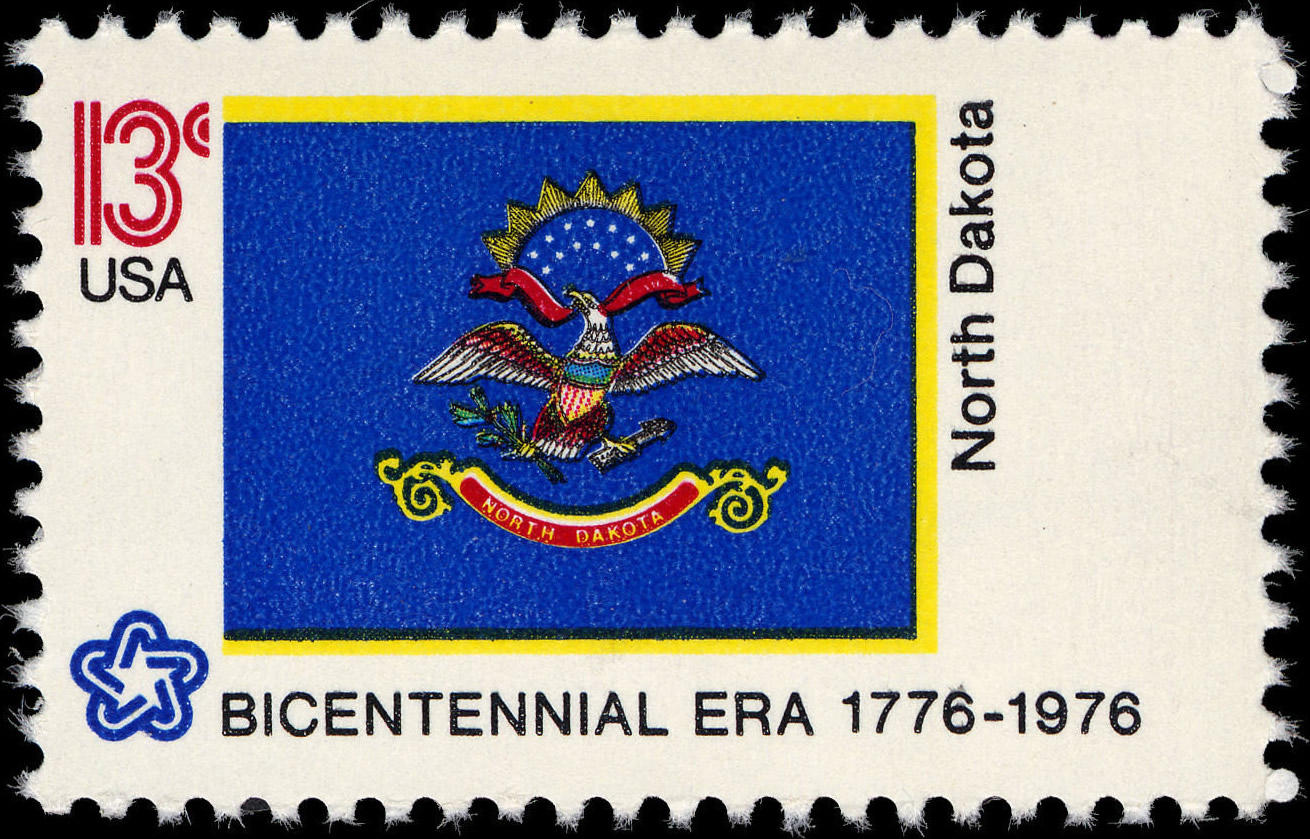
The North Dakota state flag as depicted in the 1976 bicentennial postage stamp series

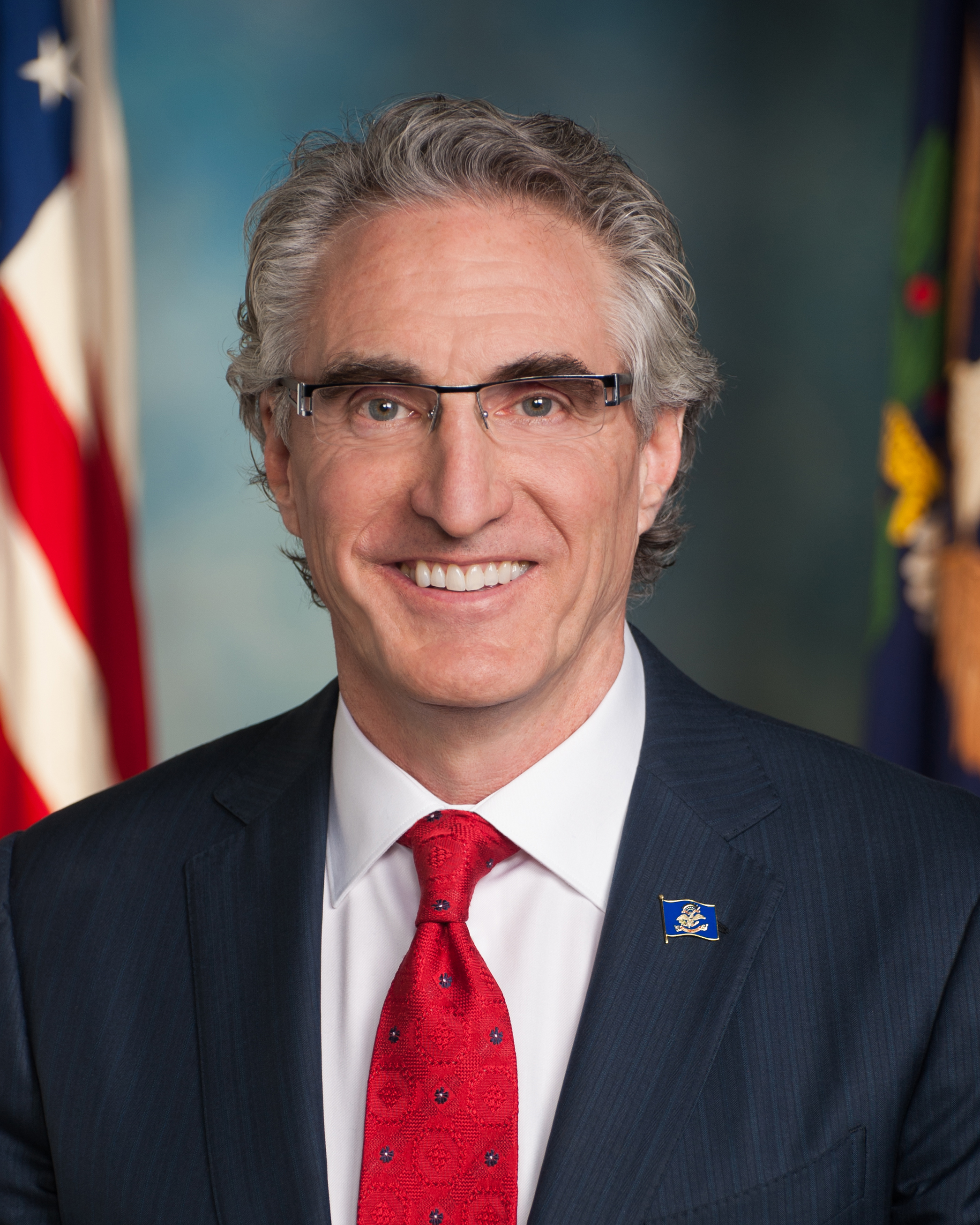
Gov. Doug Burgum (2016–2024) wearing a North Dakota State Flag lapel pin

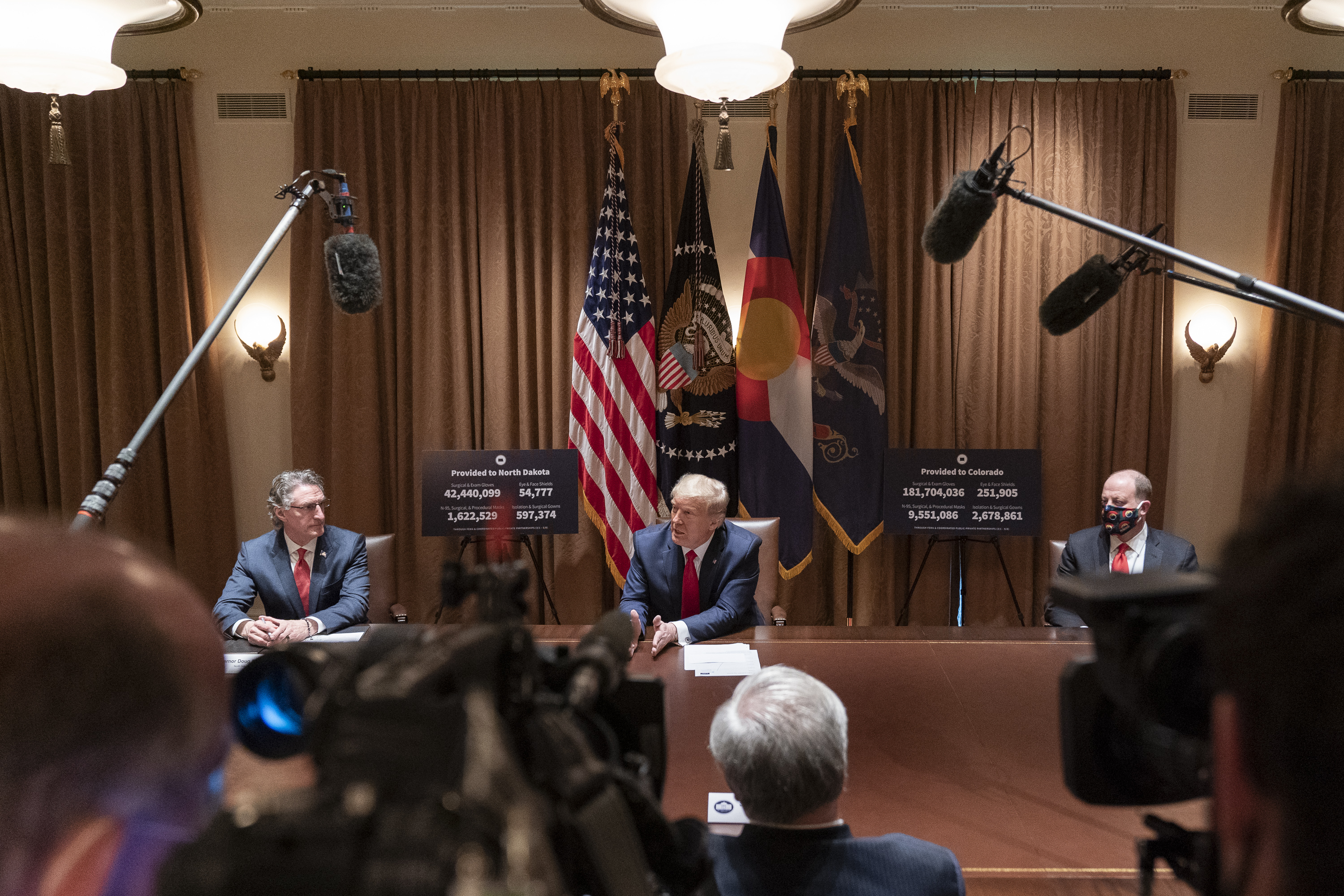
President Trump meeting with Governors Doug Burgum and Jared Polis, with the North Dakota State Flag in the background

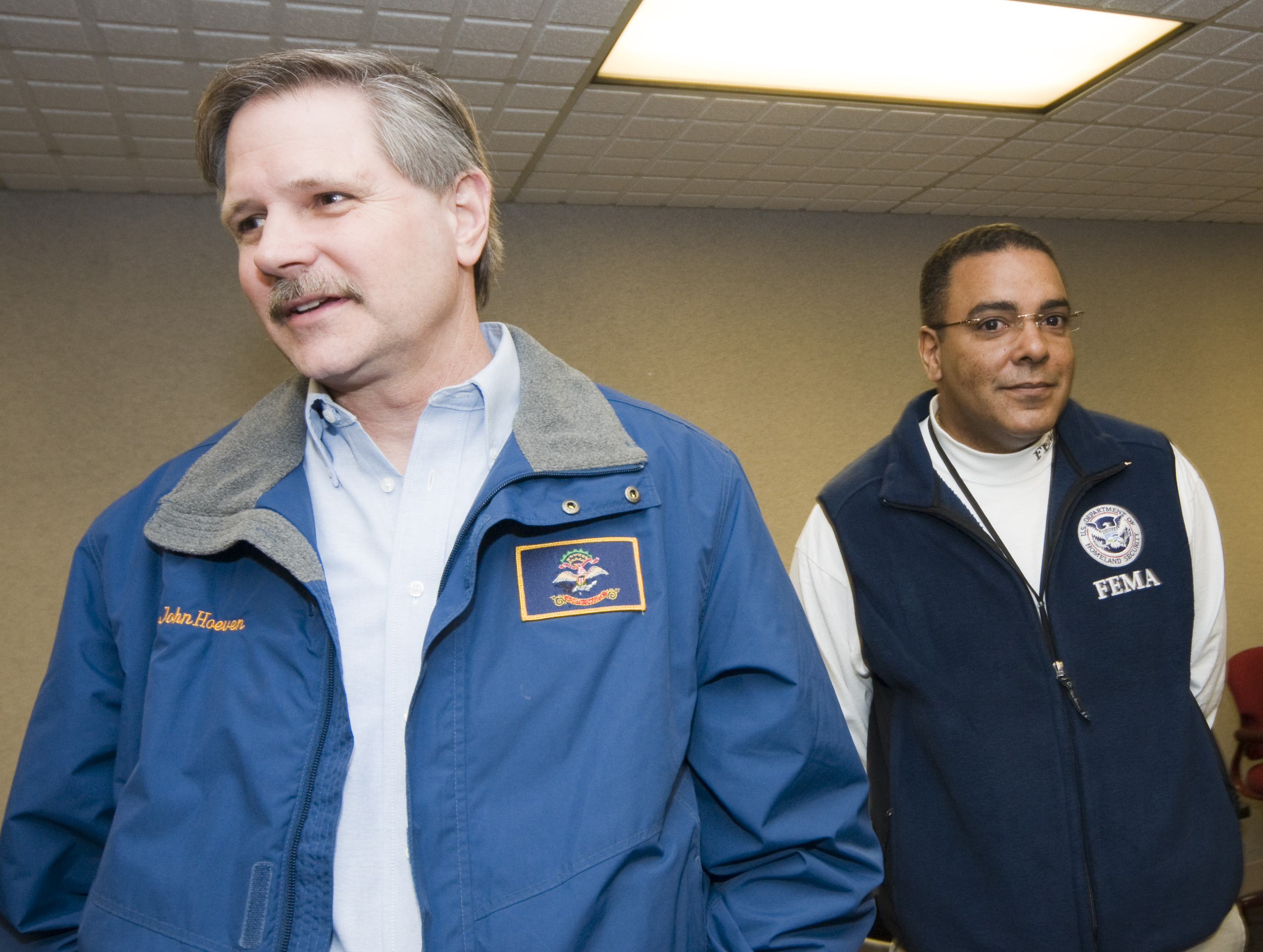
Gov. John Hoeven (2000–2010) wearing a North Dakota State Flag patch on his jacket at a press conference in Fargo

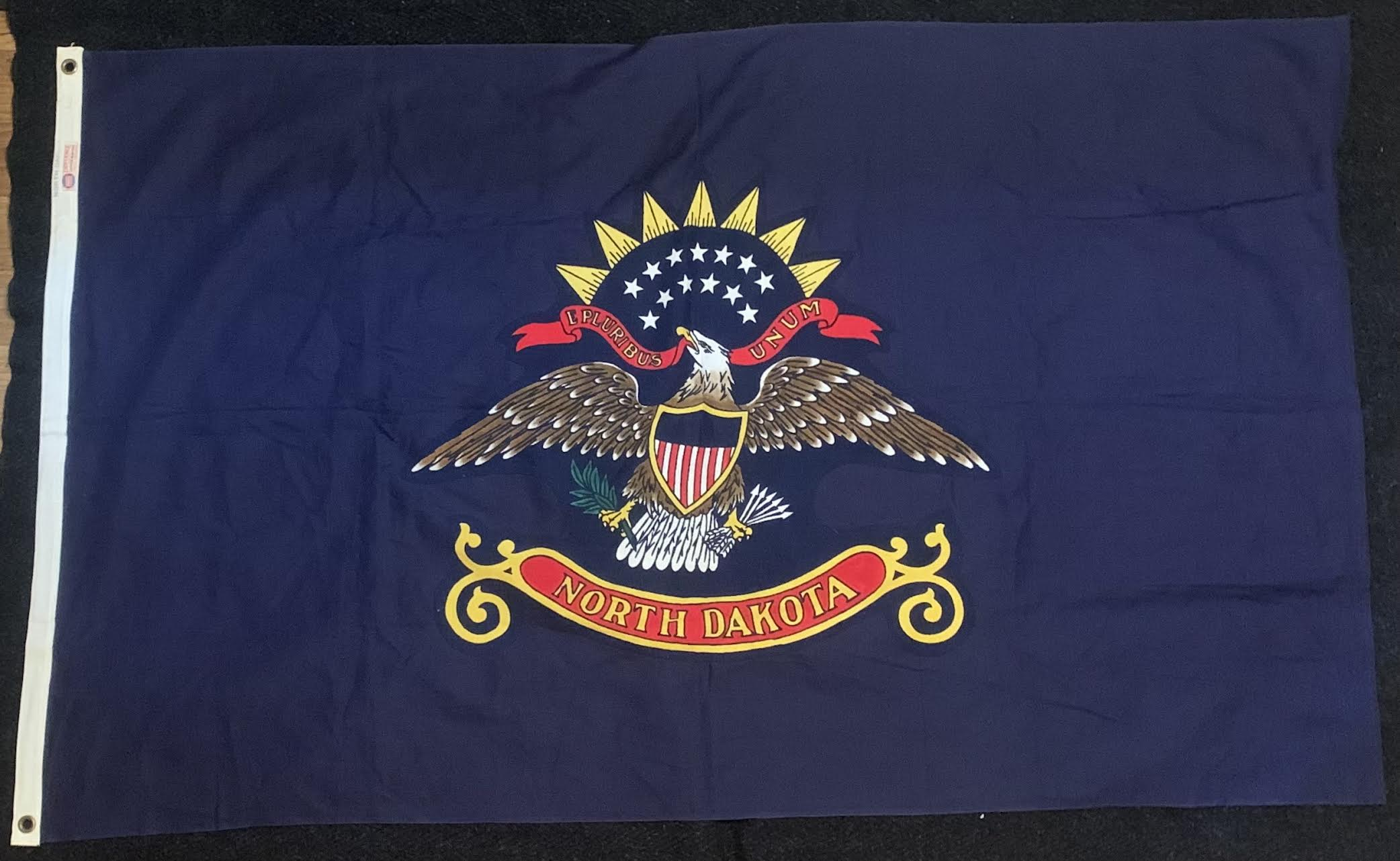
Vintage state flag featuring white stars and gold text

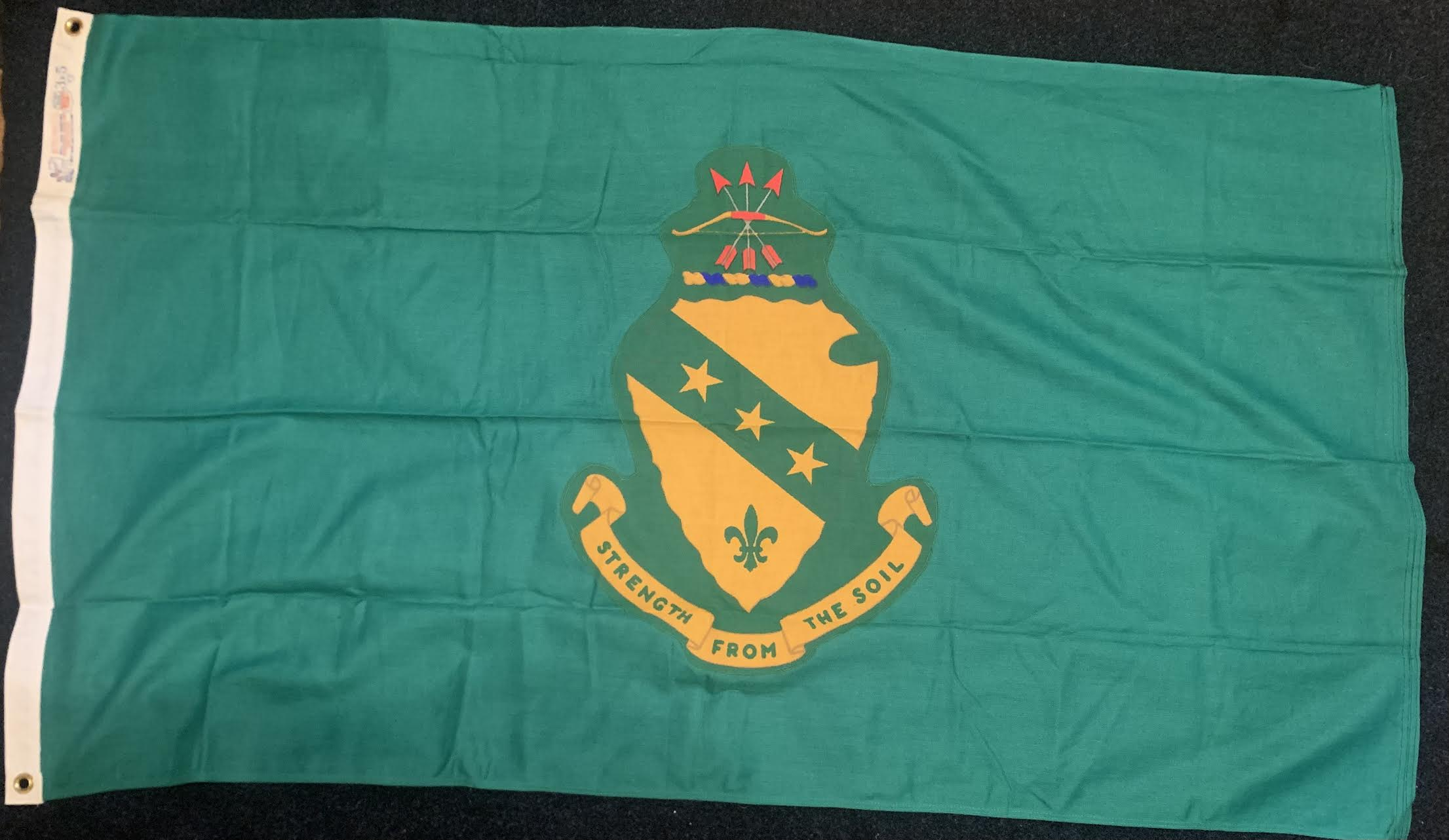
Vintage North Dakota Governor flag with no stars

== See also ==
- List of flags of North Dakota
- Flags of governors of the U.S. states
- Symbols of the state of North Dakota
- Seal of North Dakota
