= 387th =

387th may refer to:

- 387th Air Expeditionary Group (387 AEG) is a provisional United States Air Force unit assigned to the 386th Air Expeditionary Wing at Ali Al Salem Air Base, Kuwait
- 387th EOD (Explosive Ordnance Disposal) Company, part of the 79th Troop Command, Massachusetts Army National Guard, United States Army National Guard
- 387th Fighter Squadron or 175th Fighter Squadron, unit of the South Dakota Air National Guard stationed at Joe Foss Field Air National Guard Station, South Dakota
- 387th Tactical Fighter Squadron, inactive United States Air Force unit

== See also ==
- 387 (number)
- 387, the year 387 (CCCLXXXVII) of the Julian calendar
- 387 BC
