= 141st Maneuver Enhancement Brigade =

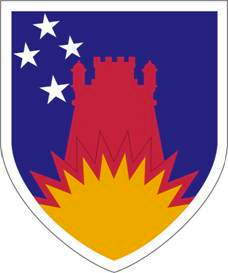
- Active: 2008 - Present
- Country: United States
- Branch: United States Army National Guard
- Type: Maneuver Enhancement
- Size: Brigade
- Part of: North Dakota Army National Guard
- Garrison/HQ: Fargo Armed Forces Reserve Center, Fargo, ND
- Motto: Defending Freedom

Insignia
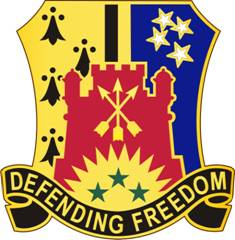
- 141ST MEB DUI

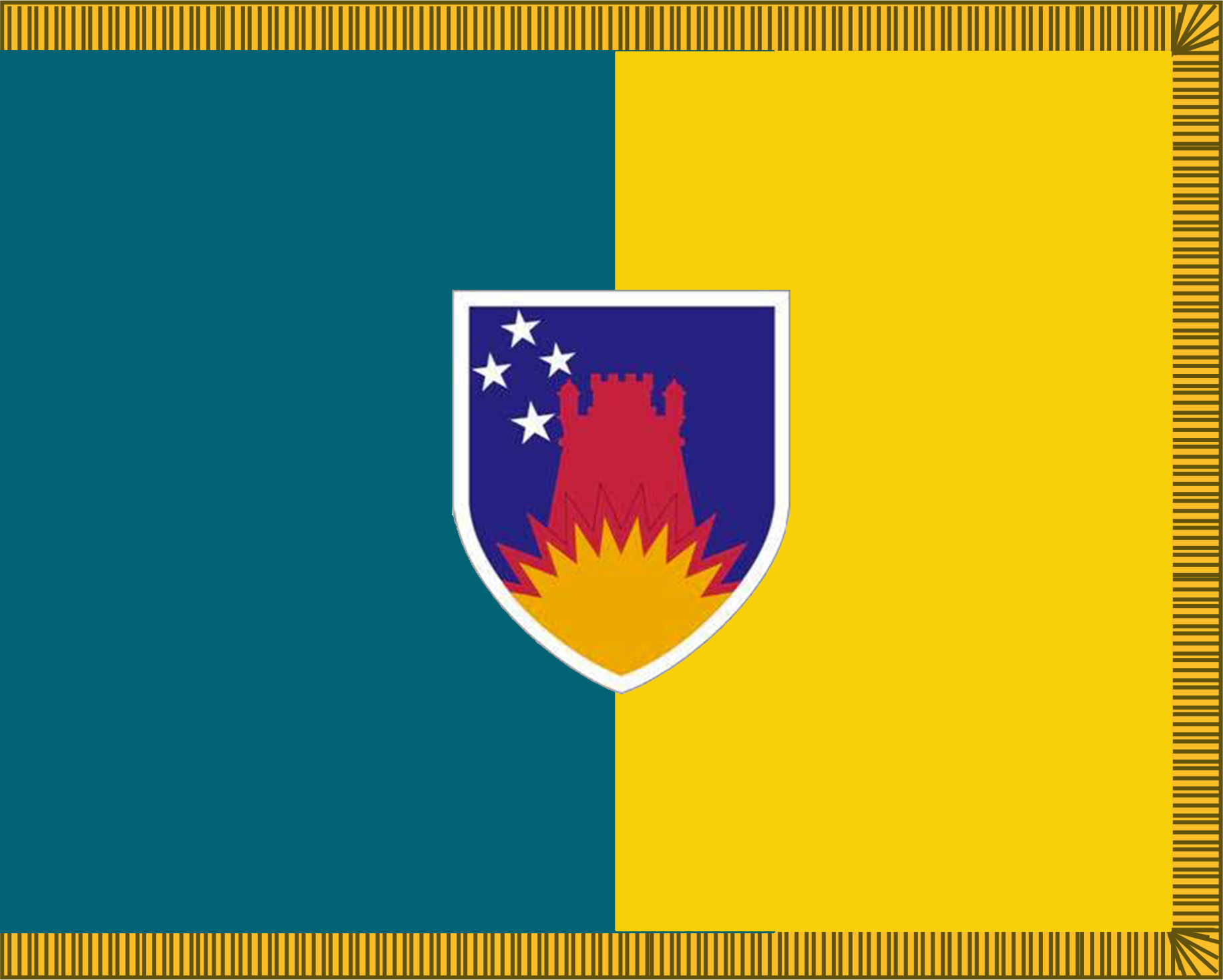
- 141st Maneuver Enhancement Brigade Flag

The 141st Maneuver Enhancement Brigade is a unit of the North Dakota Army National Guard that was redesignated in 2008. The 141 MEB has a long history beginning in 1883 as Company A Dakota Militia. It served in federal service in 1899 against Spain and in World Wars I and II.

In 1955 it was redesignated as the 141st Engineering Group and laster as an Engineer Brigade.

== Subordinate Units ==
- 141st Maneuver Enhancement Brigade (ND ARNG) Fargo Armed Forces Reserve Center | Fargo, North Dakota
  - Headquarters and Headquarters Company
- 231st Brigade Support Battalion Valley City Armory
- Headquarters and Headquarters Detachment
  - Company A Fargo Armed Forces Reserve Center
  - Company B. Fargo Armed Forces Reserve Center
- 426th Signal Company
- 1st Battalion, 188th Air Defense Artillery Regiment Grand Forks Armory
  - Headquarters and Headquarters Battery
  - Battery A Raymond J. Bohn Armory | Bismarck
  - Battery B
  - Battery C Fargo Armed Forces Reserve Center | Fargo
  - Battery D
