= 285th Aviation Regiment =

1st Battalion, 285th Aviation Regiment
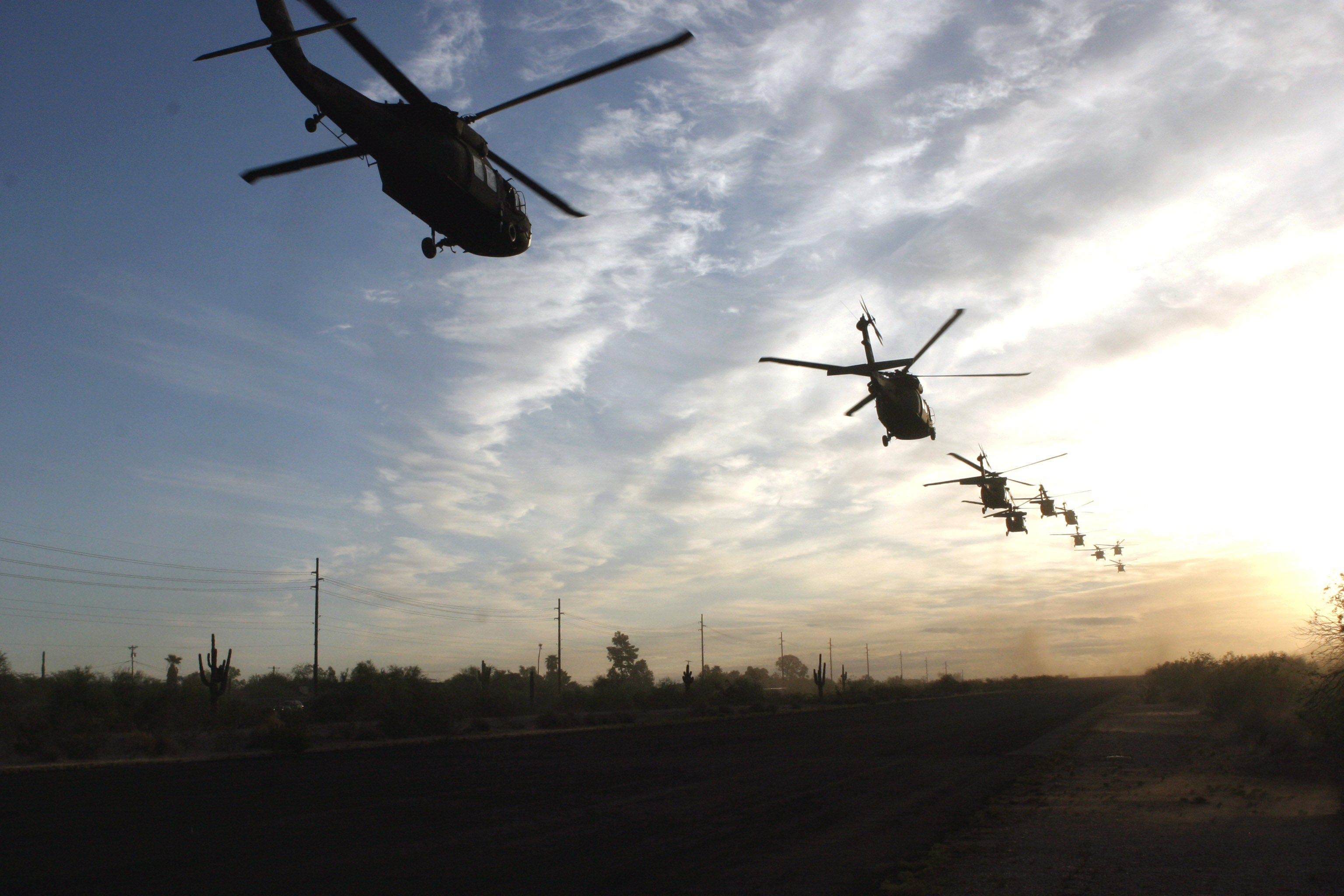
- Country: United States
- Branch: United States Army Aviation Branch
- Type: Aviation
- Part of: Arizona Army National Guard
- Garrison/HQ: Papago Park Military Reservation
- Nickname: Desert Hawks

Commanders
- Current commander: LTC Donald Kwan 2004-2007

Aircraft flown
- Attack helicopter: AH-64D Apache
- Utility helicopter: UH-60L Black Hawk

The 285th Aviation Regiment is a parent aviation regiment of the United States Army.

The lineage of the 1st Battalion, 285th Aviation Regiment began in 1971 with the formation of the 997th Aviation Company (Assault Helicopter) at Papago Army Airfield. Its Platoon D ("Delta") was equipped with UH-1M Huey gunships. On 30 September 1978 the unit was organized and federally recognized in the AZ ARNG in Phoenix as Detachment 1, Company D, 149th Aviation Battalion, an element of the 49th Armored Division. On 1 May 1982 it was designated as Company D, 149th Aviation Battalion and relocated to Marana, Arizona. On 14 April 1986 the unit transitioned to the AH-1S Cobra.

In October 1986 the unit was released from the 49th Armored Division and redesignated as the 551st Aviation Battalion. A year later it was reorganized and redesignated as the 285th Aviation, a parent regiment under the United States Army Regimental System, to consist of the 1st Battalion. It was equipped with AH-64A Apache aircraft in 1991.

On 1 October 2005 the unit was redesignated as the 1st Battalion (Attack Reconnaissance), 285th Aviation Regiment and on 1 May 2006 it was mobilized to conduct the AH-64D Unit Fielding Training Plan and deploy in support of Operation Enduring Freedom VIII.

In April 2012 and August 2013 the unit deployed its Companies A and B in support of Operation Enduring Freedom XII and XIII.

== Structure ==
- 1st Battalion (Attack Reconnaissance)
  - Headquarters and Headquarters Company (HHC)
  - Company A
  - Company B
  - Company C
  - Company D
  - Company E
- 2nd Battalion (Assault Helicopter)
  - Headquarters and Headquarters Company (HHC)
    - Detachment 2 (AR ARNG)
  - Company A
  - Company B (AR ARNG)
  - Company C (UH-60) (ND ARNG)
  - Company D (Aircraft Maintenance)
    - Detachment 1 (AR ARNG)
  - Company E (Ground Maintenance)
    - Detachment 1 (AR ARNG)
