= Camp Navajo =

Military facility and cemetery in Bellemont, Arizona

Coordinates: 35°11′37″N 111°50′31″W

Camp Navajo was originally opened in 1942 in Bellemont, Arizona, United States. It was originally designated Navajo Ordnance Depot, and its primary use was the storage of ammunition used in the Pacific Theater of World War II. It was renamed Navajo Army Depot in 1965, changed to Navajo Depot Activity in 1982, and then changed in 1993 to its current name. In 1993 the Department of Defense transferred all ammunition activities to Hawthorne Army Ammunition Plant in Nevada. Following the transfer, Camp Navajo remained federal land under the Department of the Army, overseen by the Arizona Army National Guard. The Ordnance Operations and Industrial Park are managed by the Arizona Department of Emergency and Military Affairs (AZDEMA), and the military training mission remains managed by the Arizona Army National Guard. All authority is given through the Department of Defense Army Corps of Engineers regarding engineering, design, and construction management processes for potential DoD and DoD type customers.

== Current use ==
Camp Navajo is an industrial park, munitions storage facility, and regional training site overseen by the Arizona Army National Guard, and managed by the Arizona Department of Emergency and Military Affairs.

Units located on base include:

- Headquarters and Headquarters Company, Camp Navajo
- 362nd Ordnance Company (Explosive Ordnance Disposal)
- 819th Engineer Company (Sapper)
- 856th Military Police Company

Camp Navajo is also an active munitions storage site, and industrial park, supporting numerous civilian and military customers. The camp is an inspectable site under the Strategic Arms Reduction Treaty (START). The camp has 776 igloo structures for storage of munitions.

=== Cemetery ===
Camp Navajo is the location for one of four Arizona Veterans Memorial Cemeteries.

== Camp Navajo Railroad ==
Thirty-eight miles of railroad track were built as part of the original Navajo Ordinance Depot. As the facility evolved into Camp Navajo, the Arizona Army National Guard took over operation of the tracks, to speeds up to ten miles an hour, as the Camp Navajo Railroad. The line has a junction with the nearby BNSF Railway.
