= Papago Park Military Reservation =

Arizona Army National Guard facility in Phoenix, Arizona

Coordinates: 33°28′8.89″N 111°57′40.08″W

Papago Park Military Reservation (Arizona)

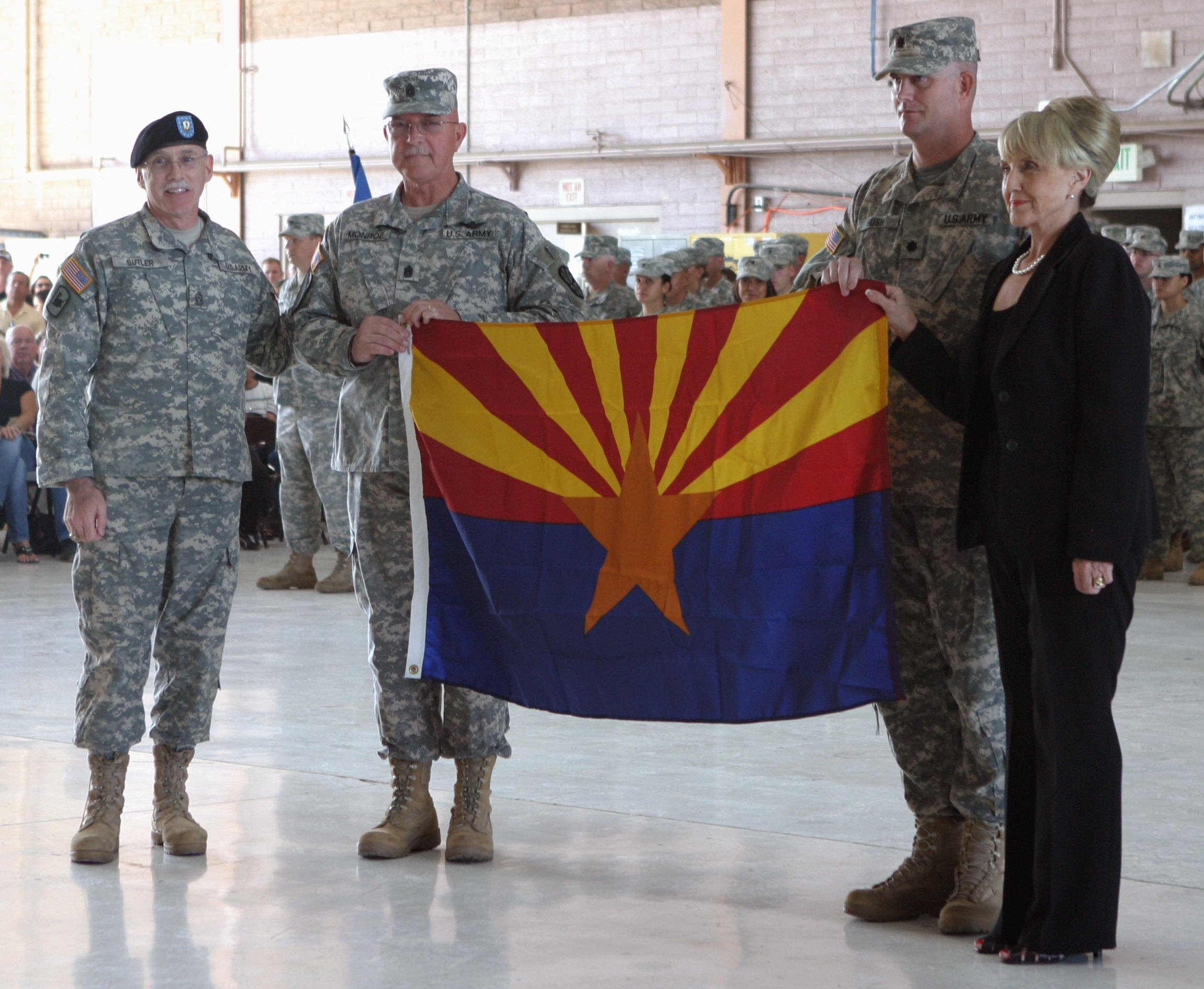
Arizona Army National Guard State Command Sgt. Maj. Max Butler, far left, and Gov. Janice K. Brewer, far right, present the state flag to 2-285 Assault Helicopter Battalion Command Sgt. Maj. Calvin Monroe, second from left, and unit commander Lt. Col. Greg Bush.

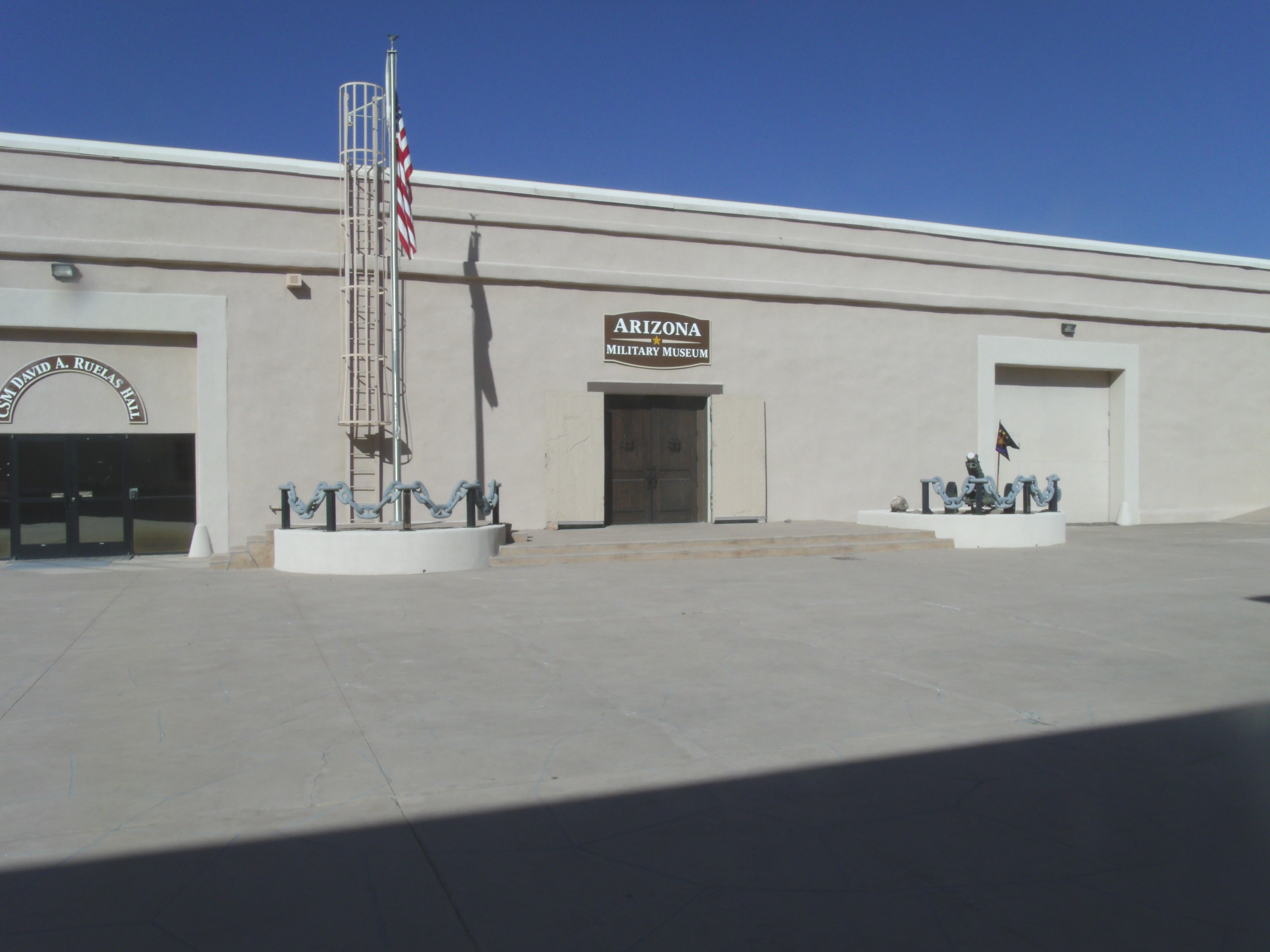
Arizona Military Museum

Papago Park Military Reservation is a facility of the Arizona Army National Guard in Phoenix, Arizona that is home to the Papago Army Aviation Support Facility, Papago Army Heliport and the Arizona Military Museum. Formerly, it was also home to the World War II POW Camp Papago Park that is adjacent to Papago Park.

The Reservation was established on April 21, 1930 by the 71st Congress.

On Halloween of 2014, a crew from the 2nd Battalion, 285th Aviation Regiment, stationed at Papago Army Heliport, dropped candy on a local Phoenix neighborhood.
