= 141st Ohio Infantry Regiment =

- Active: May 14 – September 3, 1864
- Country: United States
- Allegiance: Union
- Branch: Infantry

The 141st Ohio Infantry Regiment, sometimes 141st Ohio Volunteer Infantry (or 141st OVI) was an infantry regiment in the Union Army during the American Civil War.

== Service ==
The 141st Ohio Infantry was organized in Gallipolis, Ohio, and mustered in May 14, 1864, for 100 days service under the command of Colonel Anderson L. Jaynes.

The regiment left Ohio for Charleston, West Virginia, May 21. Assigned to garrison duty at Charleston and attached to Reserve Division, Department of West Virginia, until August 25.

The 141st Ohio Infantry mustered out of service September 3, 1864, at Gallipolis.

== Ohio National Guard ==
Over 35,000 Ohio National Guardsmen were federalized and organized into regiments for 100 days service in May 1864. Shipped to the Eastern Theater, they were designed to be placed in "safe" rear areas to protect railroads and supply points, thereby freeing regular troops for Lt. Gen. Ulysses S. Grant’s push on the Confederate capital of Richmond, Virginia. As events transpired, many units found themselves in combat, stationed in the path of Confederate Gen. Jubal Early’s veteran Army of the Valley during its famed Valley Campaigns of 1864. Ohio Guard units met the battle-tested foe head on and helped blunt the Confederate offensive thereby saving Washington, D.C. from capture. Ohio National Guard units participated in the battles of Monacacy, Fort Stevens, Harpers Ferry, and in the siege of Petersburg.

== Casualties ==
The regiment lost 6 enlisted men during service; 2 killed by bushwhackers and 4 due to disease.

== Commanders ==
- Colonel Anderson L. Jaynes

== Notable members ==
- Musician George M. Gould, Company K - noted doctor and lexicographer; inventor of the cemented bifocal lens

== See also ==
- List of Ohio Civil War units
- Ohio in the Civil War
