= Papago Army Heliport =

Airport in Maricopa County, Arizona

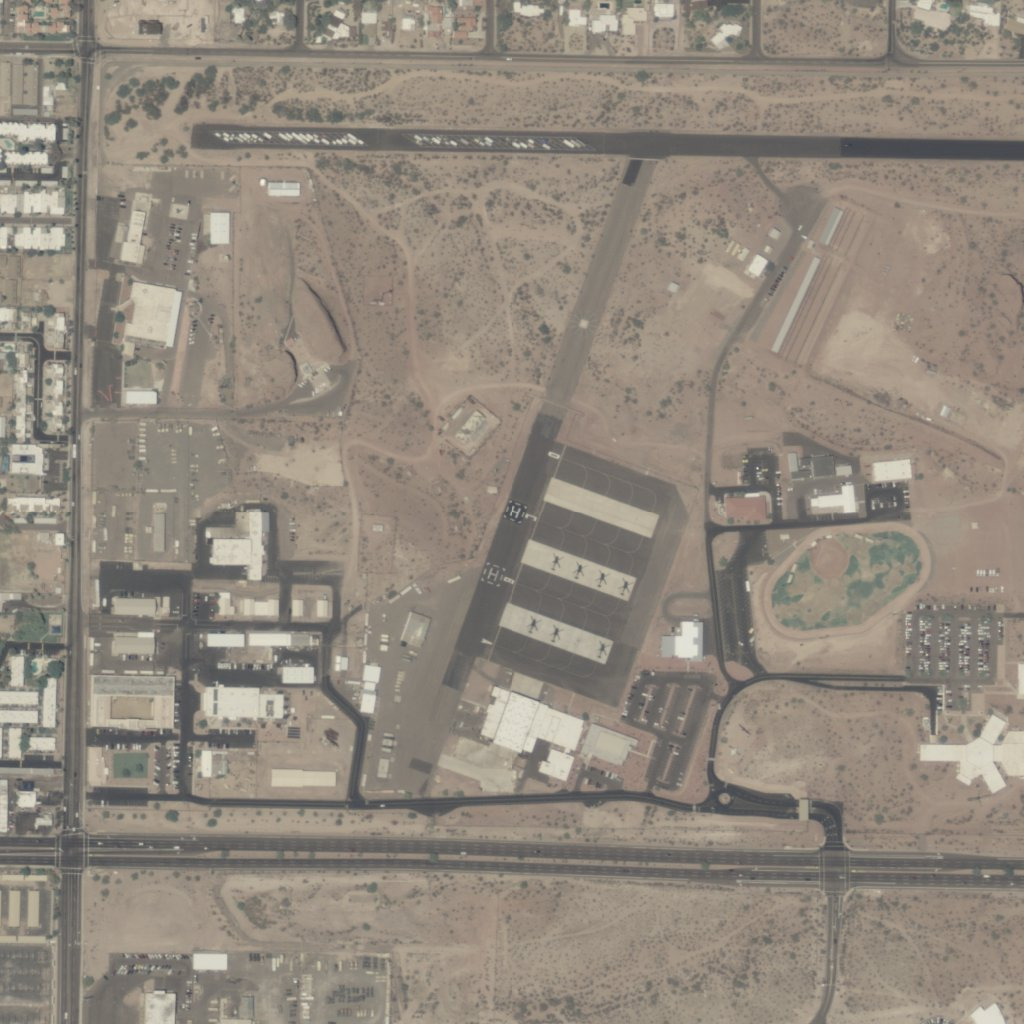
- IATA: none; ICAO: none; FAA LID: P18

Summary
- Airport type: Military
- Owner/Operator: United States Army
- Location: Phoenix, Arizona
- Elevation AMSL: 1,250 ft / 381 m
- Coordinates: 33°28′19″N 111°57′50″W

Map

Helipads
Number	Length		Surface
Number	ft	m	Surface
H1	600	183	Asphalt

Papago Army Heliport (FAA LID: P18) is a United States Army heliport at Papago Park Military Reservation. It is home to the 2nd Battalion, 285th Aviation Regiment. The airport is 6 miles (5.2 nmi; 9.7 km) east of the central business district of Phoenix, a city in Maricopa County, Arizona, United States. It is 3.5 miles (3.0 nmi; 5.6 km) northeast of Phoenix Sky Harbor International Airport.

Although most U.S. airports use the same three-letter location identifier for the FAA, IATA, and ICAO, this airport is only assigned P18 by the FAA.

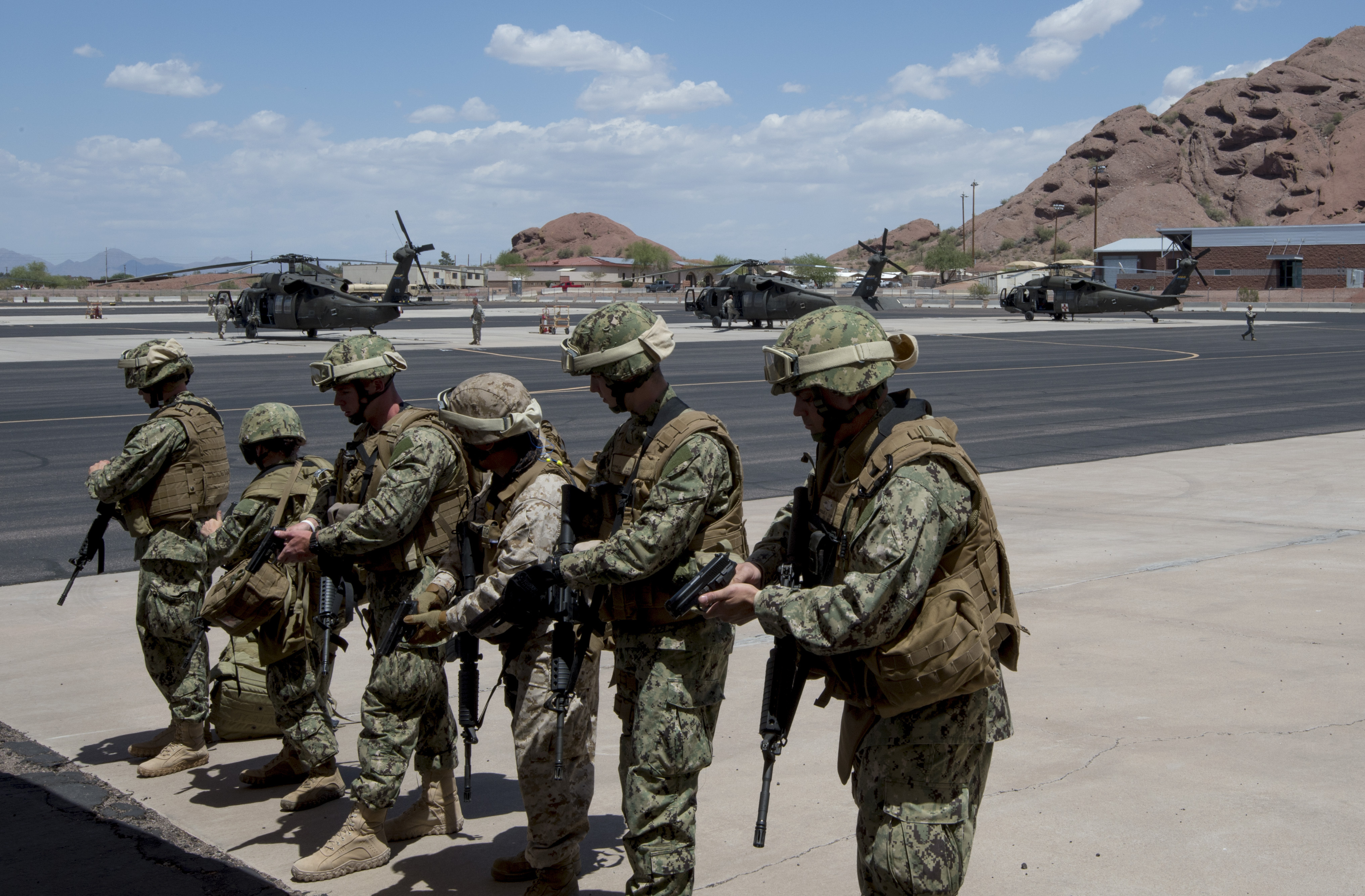
Marines at Papago Army Heliport

== Facilities and aircraft ==
Papago Army Heliport is at an elevation of 1,250 ft (380 m) above mean sea level. It has one asphalt helipad:

- 12/30 measuring 600 ft × 400 ft (180 m × 120 m)
