= 387th Explosive Ordnance Disposal Company =

387th Explosive Ordnance Disposal Company is part of the 79th Troop Command, Massachusetts Army National Guard, United States Army National Guard.

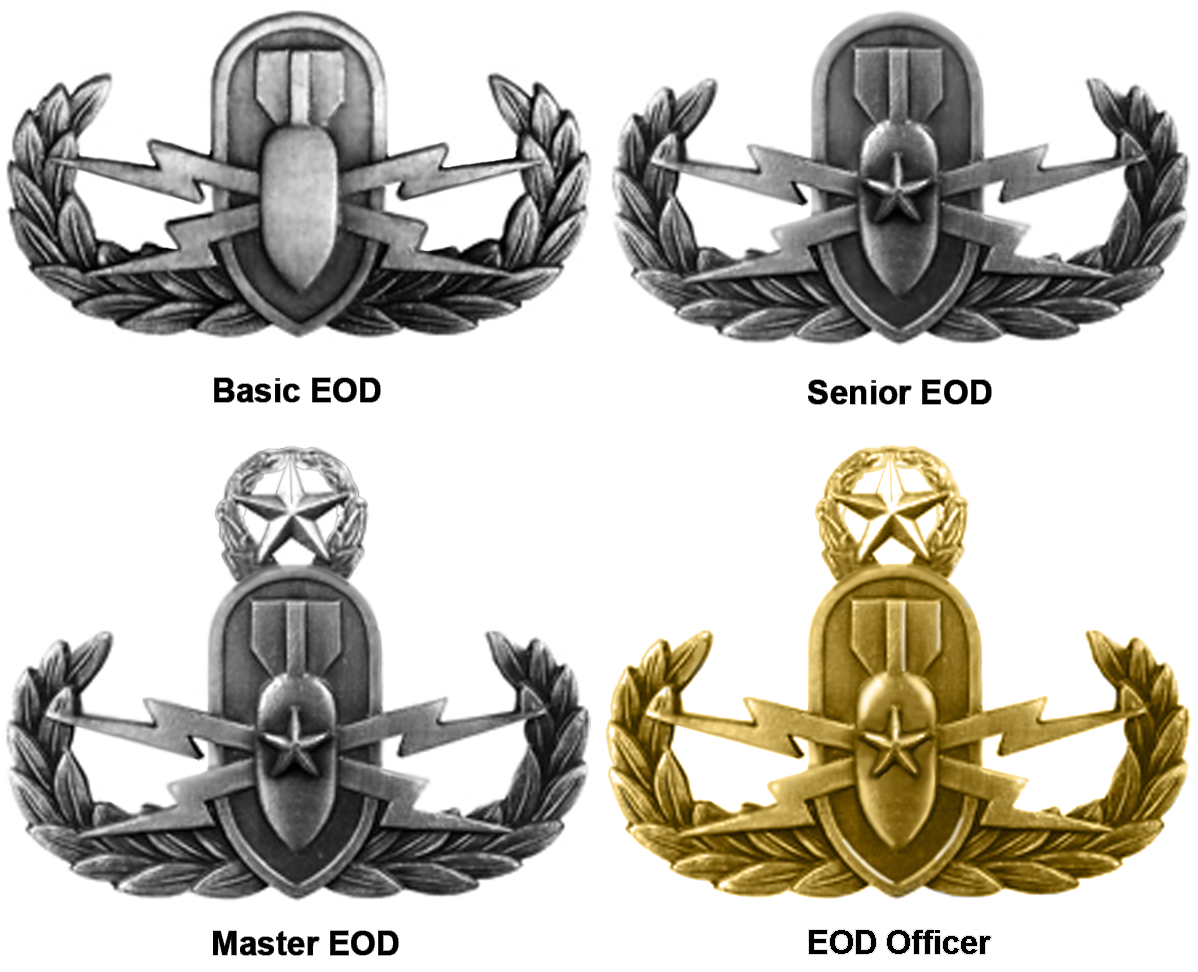
EOD Badge

== Location ==
The 387th EOD Company is located on Camp Edwards, Otis Air National Guard Base, Cape Cod, Massachusetts.

== Description of Duties ==
EOD Soldiers are the Army's "preeminent tactical and technical explosives experts. They are warriors who are properly trained, equipped and integrated to attack, defeat and exploit unexploded ordnance, improvised explosive devices and weapons of mass destruction."
