= 141st Regiment =

There have been several military units called 141st Regiment:

- 141st Aviation Training Regiment, unit of the Yugoslav Air Force
- 141st Field Artillery Regiment
- 141st Infantry Regiment "Catanzaro"
- 141st Infantry Regiment (United States)
- 141st Special Motorized Regiment
- 141 Regiment Royal Armoured Corps

== American Civil War regiments ==
- 141st Indiana Infantry Regiment
- 141st Illinois Infantry Regiment
- 141st New York Infantry Regiment
- 141st Ohio Infantry Regiment
- 141st Pennsylvania Infantry Regiment
