= North Dakota Army National Guard =

Component of the US Army and military

North Dakota National Guard
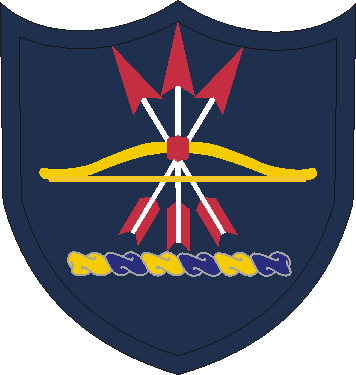
- Shoulder sleeve insignia of the North Dakota Army National Guard based on the crest of the coat of arms of North Dakota
- Active: 1883-present
- Country: United States
- Allegiance: North Dakota
- Branch: United States Army
- Role: United States Army National Guard
- Size: 3,500+
- Garrison/HQ: Fraine Barracks, Bismarck, ND
- Motto: “Strength from the soil”
- Colors: Or, Azure, Argent (Gold, Blue, Silver)

Commanders
- Current commander: BG Jonathan J. Erickson

Insignia
- North Dakota Army National Guard Crest

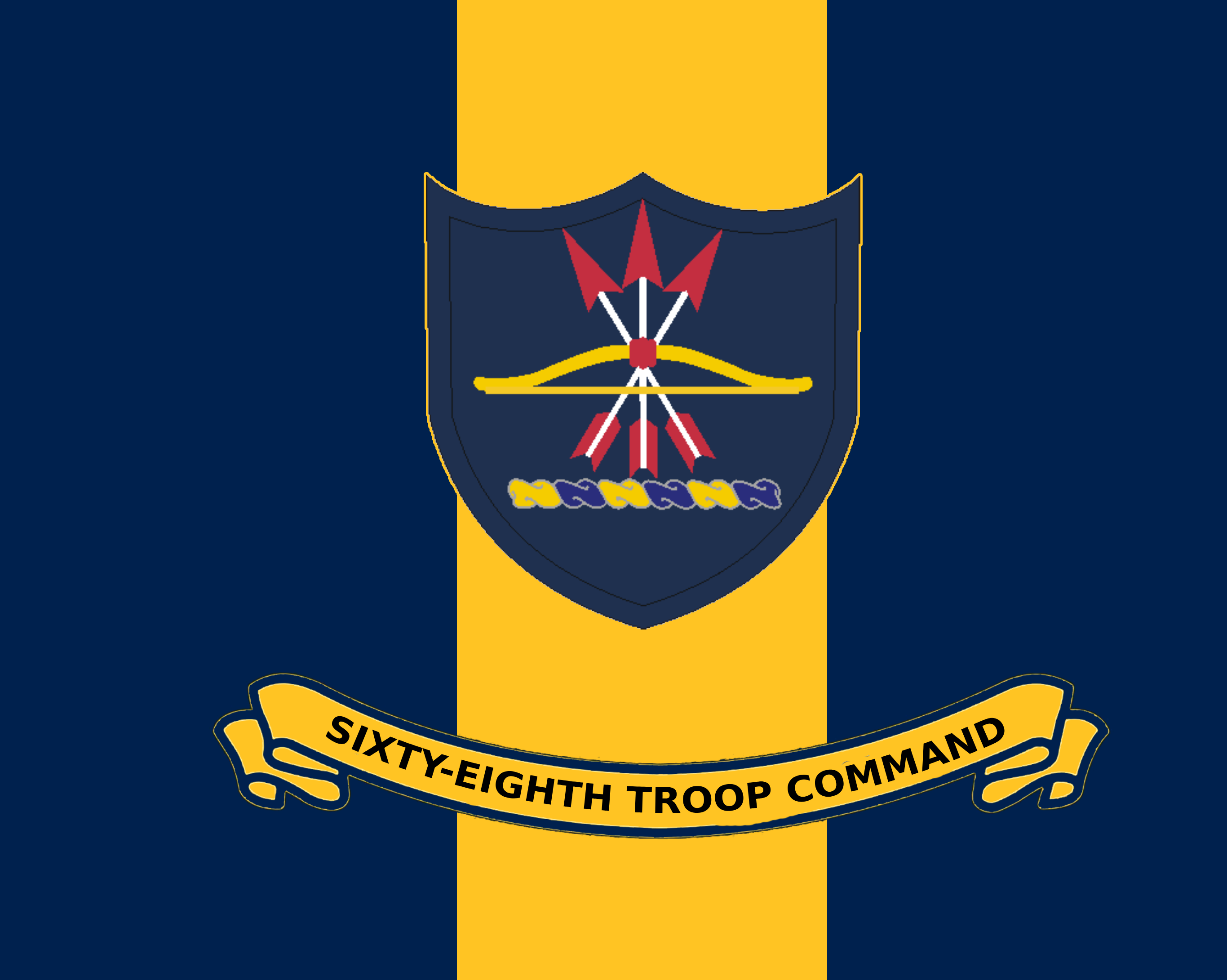
- North Dakota Army National Guard 68th Troop Command Flag

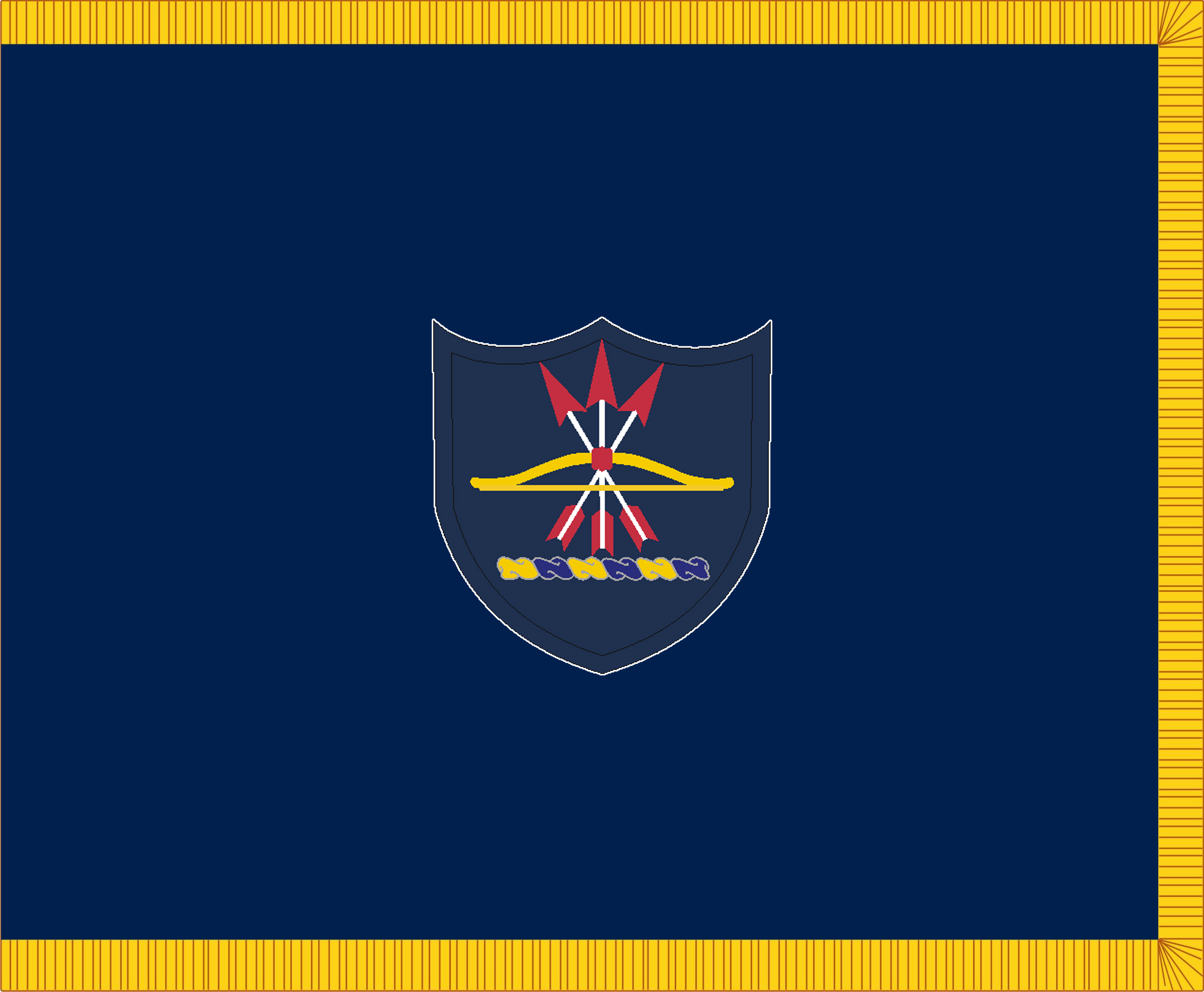
- North Dakota Army National Guard Headquarters Flag

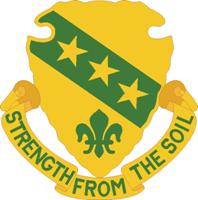
- North Dakota ARNG STARC DUI

The North Dakota Army National Guard (ND ARNG) is headquartered at the Fraine Barracks in Bismarck, North Dakota, and consists of the 68th Troop Command, headquartered in Bismarck, and the 141st Maneuver Enhancement Brigade, headquartered in Fargo, North Dakota. Their main installation and armory is at Camp Grafton.

== Structure ==
- Joint Force Headquarters-Bismarck
  - 1919th Contract Team-Bismarck
  - 3/819th JAG Team-Bismarck
- 68th Troop Command-Bismarck
- ARNG Medical Detachment-Bismarck
- Recruiting & Retention Battalion-Bismarck
- 116th Public Affairs Detachment-Bismarck
- 142d Engineer Battalion (previously the 231st Brigade Support Battalion)-Valley City
  - Headquarters and Headquarters Company-Valley City
  - Company A-Fargo
    - Detachment 1-Valley City
  - Company B-Fargo
- 164th Regiment (Regional Training Institute)
- 141st Maneuver Enhancement Brigade, in Fargo
  - Headquarters and Headquarters Company
  - 131st Military Police Battalion, in Bismarck, North Dakota
- 3662nd Maintenance Company-Camp Gilbert C. Grafton-Devils Lake
- 816th Military Police Company-Dickinson
- 1/816th Military Police Company-Bismarck
- 1/132nd Quartermaster Detachment-Bottineau
- 164th Engineer Battalion Headquarters-Minot
  - Headquarters & Headquarters Company-Minot
  - 164th Forward Support Company-Minot
  - 817th Engineer Company (Sapper)-Jamestown
  - 818th Engineer Company (Sapper)-Minot
    - Detachment 1-Williston
      - Engineer Platoon (Sapper)
      - Engineer Platoon (Sapper)
  - 957th Engineer Company (Multi Role Bridge)-Bismarck
- Detachment 42, Organizational Support Airlift-Bismarck
- 81st Civil Support Team-Bismarck
- 3662nd Component Repair Company Maintenance Company-Bismarck
- 1st Battalion (Security & Support), 112th Aviation Regiment-Bismarck
- C Company, 2nd Battalion, 285th Aviation Regiment-Bismarck
- 2-832nd Medical Company-Bismarck
- 814th Medical Detachment-Bismarck
- 2/191st Military Police Company- Bismarck
- 2/132nd Quartermaster Detachment-Rugby
- 835th Engineer Detachment-Camp Grafton
- 897th Engineer Detachment (Concrete)-Camp Grafton
- 815th Engineer Company (Horizontal)-Edgeley
  - Detachment 1-Wishek
  - Detachment 2-Lisbon
  - Detachment 3-Jamestown
- 188th Engineer Company (Vertical)-Wahpeton
  - Engineer Platoon (Vertical)
  - Engineer Platoon (Vertical)
  - Engineer Platoon (Horizontal)
- 188th Army Band-Fargo
- 191st Military Police Company-Fargo
- 231st Distribution Company-Fargo
- 231st Support Maintenance Company-Fargo
- 426th Signal Company-Fargo
- 1/231st Distribution Company-Valley City
- 1/231st Support Maintenance Company-Valley City
- 1/191st Military Police Company-Grand Forks
- 132nd Quartermaster Company-Grand Forks
- 1st Battalion, 188th Air Defense Artillery Regiment
  - Headquarters & Headquarters Battery-Grand Forks
  - Battery A-Bismarck
  - Battery B-Grand Forks
  - Battery C-Fargo
  - Detachment D-Grand Forks
- 133rd Quartermaster Detachment-Grafton
- 134th Quartermaster Detachment-Cavalier
- 3/132nd Quartermaster Detachment-Cando

== History ==
In 1883, Company A, First Regiment, Dakota National Guard, was organized at Bismarck, Dakota Territory. In 1889, North Dakota became the Union's thirty-ninth state. The North Dakota National Guard was organized, comprising six infantry companies, two cavalry troops, and one artillery battery. Eight infantry companies of the First North Dakota Regiment were mobilized for the Spanish–American War and the Philippine–American War in 1898. The Regiment earned thirty-nine silver battle rings for its guidon and ten members of the First North Dakota Infantry Volunteers were awarded the Medal of Honor.

=== Historic units ===
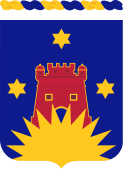
- 164th Infantry Regiment
