= 158th Infantry Regiment (United States) =

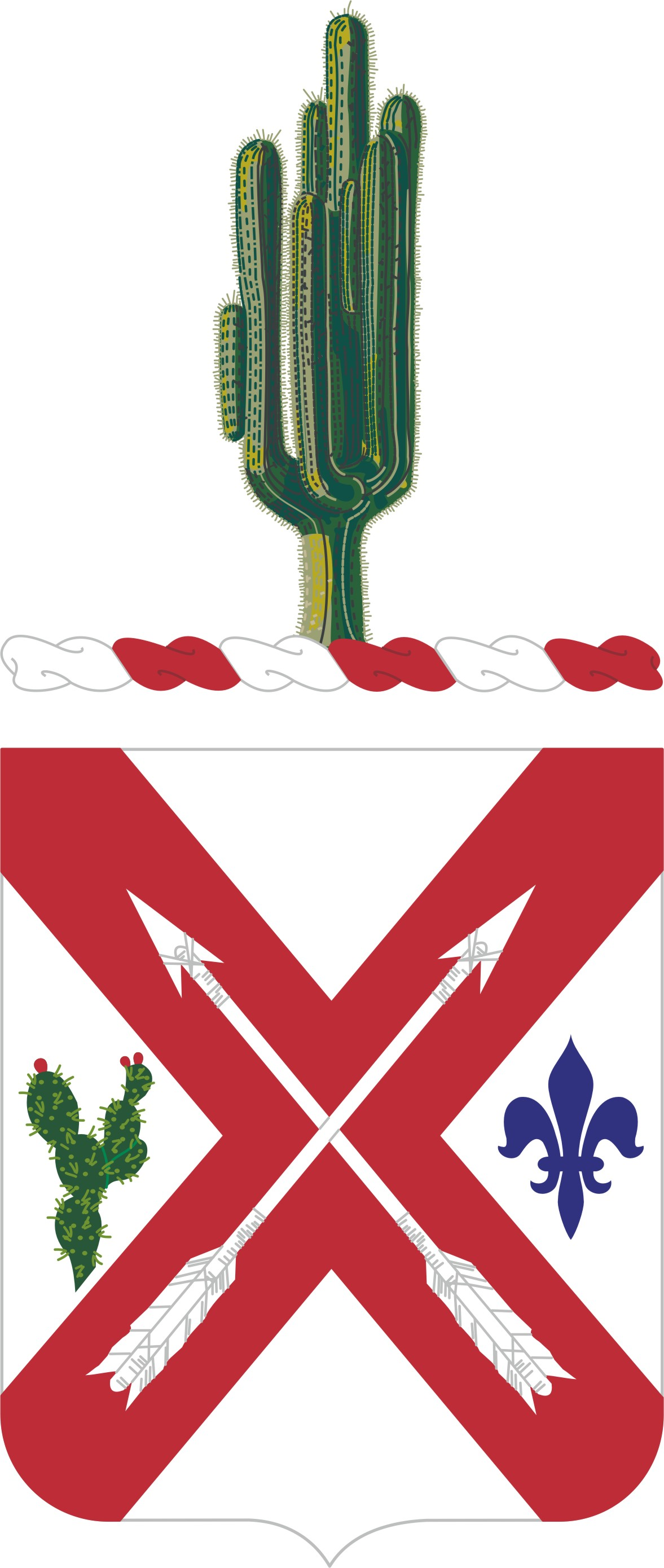
- Coat of arms
- Active: 1865-66; 1892-1919; 1924-46; 1947-67; 2005-
- Country: United States
- Allegiance: Arizona
- Branch: Arizona Army National Guard
- Type: Infantry
- Role: Light Infantry
- Size: HHC 1-158th IN (Phoenix, AZ); A-CO 1-158th IN (Tucson, AZ); B-CO -158th IN (Florence, AZ); C-CO 1-158th IN (Prescott, AZ); D-CO 1-158th IN (Buckeye, AZ); G-CO 29th BSB (Phoenix, AZ)
- Part of: 158th Maneuver Enhancement Brigade (Arizona headquarters); 29th Infantry Brigade Combat Team (Hawaii headquarters)
- Headquarters: Papago Military Reserve
- Nickname: Bushmasters (special designation)
- Motto: Cuidado (Take Care)
- Anniversaries: December 3rd was proclaimed Bushmaster Day by Governor Jack Williams in 1967
- Engagements: Indian Wars; Mexican Expedition; World War I World War II; War in Afghanistan
- Decorations: Philippine Republic Presidential Unit Citation Presidential Unit Citation (G-CO) Meritorious Unit Commendation

Commanders
- Current commander: LTC Brian Gaume
- Command Sergeant Major: CSM Whaley Wong
- Notable commanders: Col. J. Prugh Herndon Col. Earle O. Sandlin Cpt. Harold “Hal” Braun

Insignia
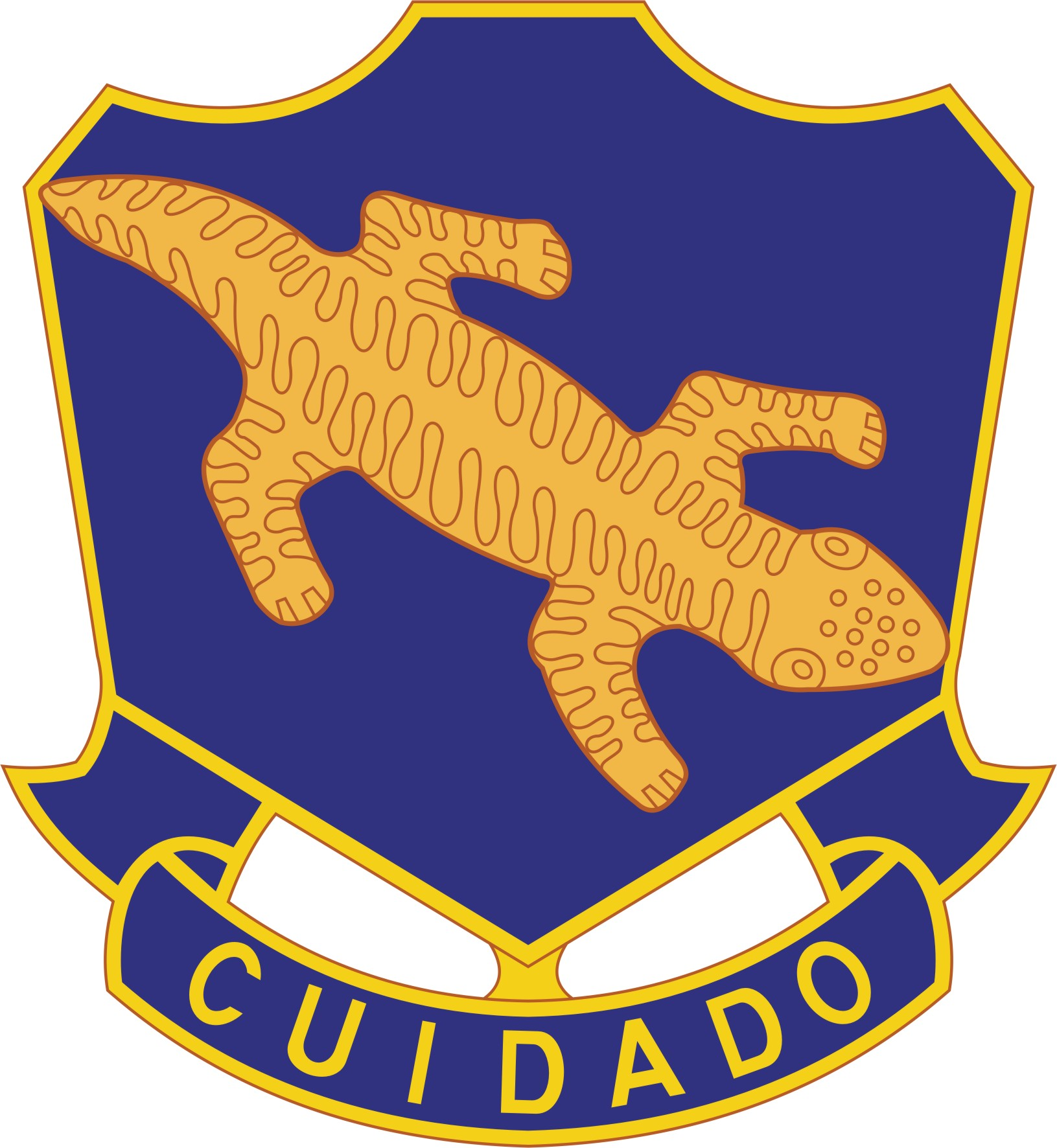
- Distinctive unit insignia

- 29th Infantry Brigade Combat Team Unit Patch: 29th Infantry Brigade Combat Team shoulder sleeve insignia

The 158th Infantry Regiment ("Bushmasters") is an infantry regiment of the Arizona Army National Guard. Its lineage extends to the 1st Arizona Volunteer Infantry, organized in 1865, and includes service during the Apache Wars, on the Mexican border, in World War I, throughout the Pacific theater of World War II, in Afghanistan, and during subsequent operations in the Middle East. The sole active element is the 1st Battalion, an Arizona Army National Guard unit for which the 158th Maneuver Enhancement Brigade serves as the Arizona headquarters and which is also aligned with the Hawaii Army National Guard's 29th Infantry Brigade Combat Team.

== History ==
=== Territorial origins and Apache Wars ===
The official lineage of the 158th Infantry begins with the 1st Arizona Volunteer Infantry, which was organized and mustered into federal service by companies between September and November 1865. The regiment comprised Companies A, B, C, E and F, totaling slightly more than 350 enlisted men and nine officers. Companies A, E and F were recruited principally among Arizona Territory's Mexican and Mexican-American population. Company B was composed principally of Maricopa people and Company C principally of Pima people. The companies normally operated as separate garrisons and field detachments rather than as a single regiment.

The Spanish motto Cuidado, meaning "Take Care", dates to the regiment's service as the 1st Arizona Volunteer Infantry. It served as both a warning to those opposing the regiment and a caution to its own soldiers.

Companies B and C helped construct Fort McDowell on the Verde River as a buffer for farms along the Verde and Salt rivers. Companies A and E occupied Camp Lincoln on the Verde River, while Company F established an outpost in Skull Valley. From these posts, the volunteers conducted scouts, guarded farms and settlements, escorted supply and freight trains, and searched the surrounding mountains for Apache raiding parties and camps.

==== Fort McDowell operations ====
Antonio Azul was an Akimel O’odham leader associated with Company C of the First Arizona Volunteer Infantry. The Salt River Pima-Maricopa Indian Community identifies him as the highest-ranking O’odham member of the regiment.

The regiment's first recorded field operation began on 8 September 1865, when soldiers of Companies B and C accompanied California volunteers on a scout into the Tonto Basin in search of Tonto Apache rancherias. After traveling approximately 110 miles, a Company B advance party located an Apache camp about nine miles east of Green Valley. The volunteers attacked and destroyed the camp before returning to Fort McDowell on 19 September. On 7 October, Company C encountered and routed an Apache group near the mouth of Tonto Creek. The contemporary report recorded five Apache fighters killed and eight people captured.

Veterans of Company B, First Arizona Volunteer Infantry, who served during the Arizona territorial campaigns of 1865–1866.

During the winter of 1865-1866, the Fort McDowell companies continued operations in the Tonto Basin and Mazatzal Mountains despite snow, worn footwear and limited supplies. On 1 January 1866, an Apache force attacked a Company C detachment traveling toward the Pima Villages, killing Hownik Mawkum and Juan Lewis.

In early March, a combined Pima and Maricopa force under Lieutenants Thomas Ewing and John D. Walker located an Apache camp approximately 40 miles from Fort McDowell. Although an accidental discharge alerted its occupants, the volunteers pursued the Apaches until sunrise, destroyed the camp and recovered property belonging to a Company C soldier killed in January.

The largest expedition launched from Fort McDowell began on 27 March 1866. Companies B and C were reinforced by approximately 300 Pima, Maricopa and Tohono O'odham auxiliaries. The force established a temporary supply point on Tonto Creek, followed Apache tracks into the mountains and approached an Apache camp on foot at night. Contemporary reports credited the expedition with 25 Apaches killed, 16 prisoners taken and eight horses recovered that had been identified as taken from the Pima villages. Three Pima soldiers were wounded and one later died.

During March and April, Company C's record of events credited the unit with 23 Apache fighters killed and 12 prisoners taken.

==== Camp Lincoln operations ====
Companies A and E operated from Camp Lincoln, protecting Verde Valley settlements, scouting the surrounding mountains and maintaining the supply route to Fort Whipple.

On 11 February 1866, Lieutenant Manuel Gallegos, contract surgeon Edward Palmer and 45 soldiers of Company E began a five-day expedition with 30 rounds of ammunition per man. After a night approach, they attacked a group of caves defended by Apaches at daybreak. The action, subsequently called the Battle of the Five Caves, ended with the lower caves taken. The contemporary report recorded 30 Apaches killed and 12 prisoners captured. Seven volunteers were wounded, and the detachment returned to Camp Lincoln on 15 February. Palmer's first-hand account stated that the soldiers marched more than 100 miles over rugged country during the operation.

From 20 to 25 March, Lieutenant Cervantes led 26 Company A soldiers on another expedition from Camp Lincoln. The detachment approached an Apache camp before daylight, attacked at close range, destroyed the camp and returned with two soldiers wounded by arrows. Contemporary accounts differed on the number of Apache casualties.

In mid-April, Captain Hiram Washburn led 25 Company E soldiers westward to improve the wagon route to Fort Whipple. During the movement, the detachment fought an Apache group reported as numbering approximately 30, killed six, wounded several, took one prisoner and continued the route mission.

In early June, an Apache force estimated at approximately 90 people ambushed Sergeant Miguel Elias and nine Company E soldiers escorting supplies from Fort Whipple at Grief Hill west of Camp Lincoln. Elias and one soldier were wounded, cattle were driven off and two pack mules were killed. A follow-up force tracked the Apache raiders toward Black Canyon, and a later patrol recovered two of the cattle. Companies A and E also escorted supply parties and guarded cornfields at the Clear Fork settlement.

==== Skull Valley operations ====
While Companies B and C operated from Fort McDowell and Companies A and E operated from Camp Lincoln, Company F was assigned to an outpost in Skull Valley southwest of Prescott. Its principal mission was to protect settlers and travelers and escort freight along the Prescott-La Paz road, an important supply route connecting Fort Whipple with the Fort Yuma depot.

In January 1866, a force described in the surviving records as numbering approximately 50 attacked five Company F soldiers guarding an ammunition wagon from Fort Yuma to Fort Whipple about eight miles from Skull Valley. Two guards were killed and a third was wounded during the three-hour fight. The wagon was carrying a large shipment of ammunition intended for Fort Whipple.

From 13 to 27 July, Lieutenant Oscar F. Hutton led 18 Arizona volunteers and 18 California volunteers on an approximately 300-mile expedition through the mountains north of Prescott. The soldiers traveled through rugged country for nearly two weeks before locating a camp. The force attacked and destroyed the camp, killed one of its occupants, wounded two and took two prisoners. The surviving account describes its occupants as Indians but does not identify their tribal affiliation more specifically.

On 13 August, Company F moved to protect another wagon train near Skull Valley after a confrontation developed with a large armed group. The military records identified members of the group as Apache-Mojave, Mojave, Hualapai and Tonto people. Close fighting lasted approximately 45 minutes. One Company F soldier was killed and another suffered severe cuts, while the civilian teamsters remained uninjured. Period reports credited the volunteers with 23 opposing fighters killed and approximately 50 wounded.

The most detailed academic study of the 1st Arizona Volunteer Infantry's service was completed by Lonnie Edward Underhill as a 1979 master's thesis in the University of Arizona Department of History. Underhill reconstructed the regiment's history using original company and regimental muster rolls, company record-of-events cards, expedition reports, post returns, officers' correspondence, War Department records and contemporary Arizona newspapers.

Underhill's examination of the muster rolls counted ten volunteers killed in engagements, thirteen seriously wounded, five deaths from illness and two soldiers killed while fishing near the Verde River. He found that the surviving operational reports collectively credited the volunteers with approximately 150 to 173 Apaches killed, 38 seriously wounded and 58 captured. Underhill cautioned that the totals varied because reports submitted by the Pima and Maricopa companies may have counted some of the same casualties.

In addition to their field operations, the five companies constructed much of their own shelter and post infrastructure while enduring chronic shortages of food, clothing, footwear, transportation and pay. The regiment's companies were mustered out of federal service at different times between September and November 1866.

=== Territorial militia and Spanish-American War era ===
Between May 1882 and April 1892, Arizona's militia companies were reorganized as the 1st Regiment, Infantry. The territorial militia was redesignated the Arizona National Guard on 19 March 1891. During the Spanish-American War, members of the Arizona National Guard entered federal service through temporary volunteer organizations. Ten officers and 117 enlisted men volunteered for the 1st United States Volunteer Cavalry, popularly known as the Rough Riders. Arizona's contingent included troops led by Captains William "Buckey" O'Neill and James H. McClintock, with former Arizona regimental commander Alexander O. Brodie serving as a major.

The Rough Riders fought at Las Guasimas on 24 June 1898, where Brodie and McClintock were wounded. On 1 July, the regiment seized Kettle Hill and continued onto the heights overlooking Santiago. O'Neill was killed during the fighting. The capture of the heights supported the investment of Santiago and preceded the Spanish surrender there.

Arizona also furnished Companies A, B and C and the regimental band of the 1st Territorial Volunteer Infantry, commanded by former territorial governor Myron H. McCord. The Arizona companies assembled at Fort Whipple and departed Prescott on 28 September 1898 to join volunteers from New Mexico, Oklahoma and Indian Territory at Camp Hamilton near Lexington, Kentucky. The regiment later moved to Camp Churchman near Albany, Georgia, and was mustered out in February 1899.

=== Camp Perry and the Arizona State Flag ===

The regiment's pre-World War I history is connected with the creation of the flag of Arizona. The Arizona Army National Guard's official history states that a majority of the personnel serving on Arizona's rifle teams at the National Matches at Camp Perry, Ohio, were members of the First Arizona Infantry. Charles W. Harris, captain of the territorial rifle team, had been commissioned as a first lieutenant in Company C, First Arizona Infantry, on 27 July 1909.

During the 1910 National Matches, the Arizona team was reportedly the only participating National Guard team without its own flag or identifying emblem. Harris developed a design incorporating thirteen alternating red and yellow rays, a copper-colored star and a blue lower field. A flag based on the design accompanied the Arizona rifle team to Camp Perry in 1911. The design subsequently became the basis of the Arizona state flag, which was adopted by the state legislature in 1917.

The rifle-team members served before the organization received the 158th Infantry designation. The Army's official lineage records that the First Arizona Infantry was reorganized and redesignated as the 158th Infantry on 3 October 1917. The Camp Perry rifle team's connection to the Bushmasters is therefore through the regiment's organizational lineage.

=== Mexican Border service ===
Following raids and continued instability along the United States-Mexico border, President Woodrow Wilson called the Arizona, New Mexico and Texas National Guards into federal service on 9 May 1916. The 1st Arizona Infantry, commanded by Colonel Alexander M. Tuthill, mobilized at Camp Harry J. Jones in Douglas and was mustered into federal service during May and June. Elements served at Douglas, Naco, Ajo, Nogales, Fort Huachuca and other Arizona border outposts.

The regiment guarded and patrolled the Arizona border, maintained observation posts and protected border communities and lines of communication while Regular Army units operated with Pershing's expedition in Mexico. The mobilization also provided sustained field training under operational conditions. The border service continued into 1917. On 5 August 1917, the regiment was drafted into federal service for World War I. It was reorganized and redesignated the 158th Infantry on 3 October and assigned to the 40th Division.

=== World War I ===
The 1st Arizona Infantry was drafted into federal service 5 August 1917 and re-designated as the 158th Infantry Regiment as part of the 79th Brigade, of the 40th Division. The division was sent overseas to France in August 1918. The regiment saw no active service at the front, however, its men furnished replacement personnel to other units. The regiment acted as the guard of honor to President Woodrow Wilson during his visit to France in 1918, and the regimental band marched and performed in the Allied Victory Parade which he attended. On April 6, 1919, the regiment sailed from the Port of Bordeaux, France and arrived at the port of Hoboken, New Jersey on April 17, 1919, aboard the USS Iowan, The 158th Infantry was relieved from assignment to the 40th Division on 20 April 1919, and was demobilized on 3 May 1919 at Camp Kearny, California.

=== Interwar period ===
1-158th Infantry Soldiers Manning a Machine Gun Position at the Colorado River

The 158th Infantry was reconstituted in the National Guard in 1921, assigned to the 45th Division, and allotted to the state of Arizona. The regiment was reorganized from 1922 to 1924, with the headquarters organized and federally recognized at Phoenix, Arizona, on 12 September 1924. The headquarters was relocated on 11 October 1932 to Tucson, Arizona. In 1924, F Company was formed as an all-native American unit made up of alumni of the Phoenix Indian School. In March 1934 the 158th Infantry Regiment participated in an unusual deployment. After California unilaterally announced, without the agreement of Arizona, it would begin construction of the Parker Dam across the Colorado River, Arizona's governor Benjamin Baker Moeur sent a contingent of six members of the Arizona National Guard to the banks of the river. In November 1934, after California began building a bridge across the river to begin dam construction, the governor declared martial law and mobilized 100 National Guard troops with rifles and machine guns from the 158th Infantry Regiment under the command of Major Franklin Pomeroy to block construction. The troops commandeered two steamboats, mounted machine guns on the boats, and thus was born what would be nicknamed the Arizona Navy. The issue was later resolved peacefully through federal law and negotiations as part of the Colorado River Compact.

=== World War II ===
U.S. Army Jungle Tab

==== Mobilization and Panama Canal defense ====
The 158th Infantry was ordered into federal service on 16 September 1940 and initially trained at Fort Sill, Oklahoma. The regiment moved to Camp Barkeley, Texas, in February 1941 and subsequently participated in large-scale maneuvers in Louisiana. Following the United States' entry into World War II, the regiment was ordered to the Panama Canal Zone, arriving on 2 January 1942. On 11 February it was relieved from assignment to the 45th Infantry Division and thereafter served as a separate infantry regiment.

The 158th joined the Panama Mobile Force, where it served alongside the 5th Infantry and 14th Infantry in the defense of the Canal Zone. Its soldiers constructed training areas, conducted extended jungle patrols and experimented with equipment, weapons, rations and tactics intended for tropical warfare. In 1942 the 158th was one of four Panama Mobile Force infantry regiments directed to establish experimental jungle platoons whose experiences contributed to the expansion of jungle-warfare training throughout the Caribbean Defense Command.

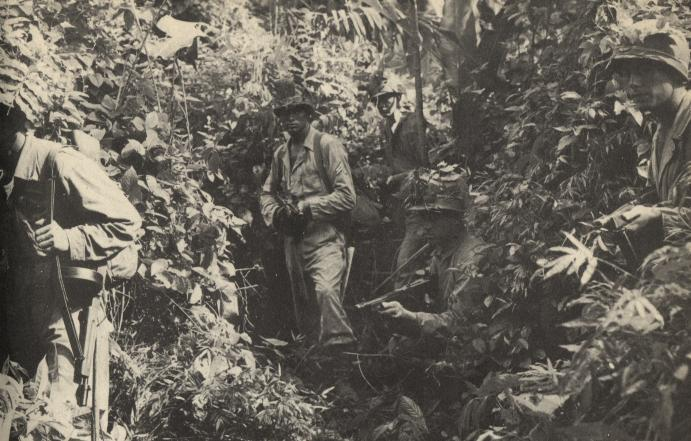
Jungle patrol in Panama

During this period the regiment adopted the name Bushmasters, after the highly venomous bushmaster snake encountered in the Central American jungle. The wartime unit insignia depicted a bushmaster coiled around a machete or bolo, combining the hazards of the jungle with the principal tool used by soldiers to move through it. The imagery complemented the regiment's older Spanish motto, Cuidado ("Take Care").

In November 1942 the regiment was ordered to prepare for movement to the Southwest Pacific. It departed Panama in early January 1943 and arrived at Brisbane, Australia, later that month before moving to Port Moresby, New Guinea, in March.

==== Southwest Pacific deployment and Operation Chronicle ====
The earliest combat contact involving the regiment recorded in the Army's postwar combat chronicle occurred on 9 March 1943, when 42 Japanese survivors of a convoy destroyed near Lae reached Goodenough Island. According to the chronicle, most of the group was killed or captured by a patrol of the 158th, while other small groups were pursued on the New Guinea mainland.

The regiment subsequently moved through Milne Bay and the islands east of New Guinea as Allied forces prepared Operation Cartwheel, the campaign intended to isolate the Japanese base at Rabaul. On 24 June 1943 an advance party of the 158th under Lieutenant Colonel Floyd G. Powell landed at Kiriwina to prepare for the main landing. On 30 June the 158th Infantry, less the 2nd Battalion, landed near Losuia as the principal infantry component of Kiriwina Force. The operation was unopposed; the regiment's mission was to occupy and defend the island while engineers constructed an airfield and support installations.

The 2nd Battalion meanwhile performed security duties for Sixth Army headquarters at Milne Bay and later on Goodenough Island. Elements of the regiment also served on Kiriwina and Woodlark Islands. Although these operations involved little or no Japanese opposition, they provided experience in amphibious movement, jungle operations and the establishment of forward bases later used during combat operations.

==== Bismarck Archipelago campaign ====
===== Battle of Arawe =====
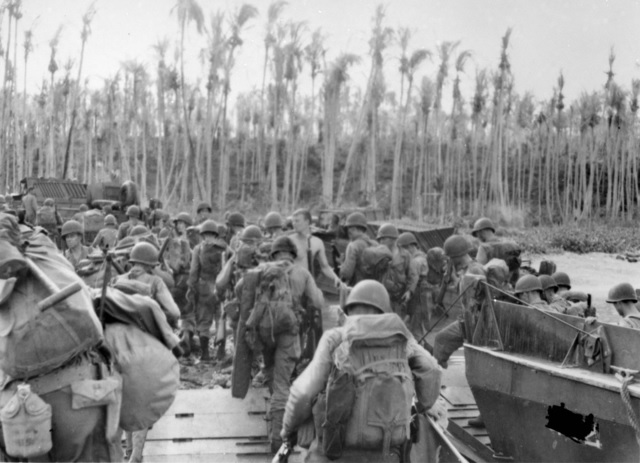
American troops during operations at Arawe, New Britain, in December 1943. The 2nd Battalion, 158th Infantry later reinforced the Arawe beachhead.

The 158th entered sustained ground combat during the Battle of Arawe on New Britain. The Arawe landing had been conducted on 15 December 1943 by the Director Task Force under Brigadier General Julian W. Cunningham, principally using the 112th Cavalry Regiment. The 2nd Battalion, 158th Infantry was designated as a reserve available to reinforce the beachhead.

Brigadier General Julian W. Cunningham at Arawe. Cunningham commanded the Director Task Force during the Arawe operation.

The Japanese initially possessed only a small force around Arawe, but reinforcements were moving toward the American perimeter. These included elements of the 17th Division, including Major Masamitsu Komori's elements of the 1st Battalion, 81st Infantry Regiment and troops of the 1st Battalion, 141st Infantry Regiment. The combined Japanese force around Arawe became known as the Komori Force. Japanese troops operated through trackless jungle and suffered from limited supplies, disease and repeated American air and artillery attacks.

After Japanese forces pushed toward the American main line of resistance in late December, Cunningham requested reinforcements. Company G ("George Company"), 2nd Battalion, 158th Infantry arrived on 27 December, followed by additional elements of the battalion. Patrols of the Bushmasters and 112th Cavalry made repeated contact with Japanese forces near Umtingalu and the approaches to the American perimeter.

When attempts by the cavalry to reduce the Japanese defensive line failed, Cunningham requested additional infantry and tanks. Company F ("Fox Company") of the 158th arrived on 10 January 1944, followed by light tanks of Company B, 1st Marine Tank Battalion. The infantry and Marine tankers then conducted several days of combined-arms training.

On 16 January, after attacks by B-24 and B-25 aircraft and an artillery and mortar preparation, elements of the 158th, Marine tanks and C Troop of the 112th Cavalry attacked the Japanese defensive position. The tanks led with infantry following closely to destroy or bypass bunkers and firing positions. The attack broke the Japanese defensive line and forced Komori's troops away from the American perimeter.

First Lieutenant Robert Knight Perry, executive officer of a rifle company of the 158th, was severely wounded during an assault against a heavily defended Japanese position at Arawe. Although unable to stand, Perry assumed command after the company suffered numerous casualties. From an exposed position approximately 25 yards from several Japanese machine guns, he continued reporting the tactical situation to battalion headquarters, identified enemy machine-gun positions, directed tanks and infantry against them and supervised evacuation of wounded soldiers. Perry refused evacuation for approximately three and one-half hours and was subsequently awarded the Distinguished Service Cross.

After the Arawe operation, the 2nd Battalion moved to Finschhafen, where it rejoined the regiment's other battalions.

==== New Guinea campaign ====
===== 158th Regimental Combat Team =====
Members of the 158th Regimental Combat Team push a jeep ashore from an LCVP during amphibious training exercises on Guadalcanal, Solomon Islands, on 11 March 1944.

The 158th Infantry became the infantry nucleus of the 158th Regimental Combat Team. The combat team normally combined the 158th Infantry with the 147th Field Artillery Battalion and supporting medical, engineer and service units. Its composition could be enlarged or reduced according to the mission, allowing it to operate independently in areas where a full infantry division was unnecessary or unavailable.

Its principal supporting elements included the 147th Field Artillery Battalion, the 506th Medical Collecting Company and 1st Platoon, 637th Medical Clearing Company. During later operations additional engineers, tanks, artillery and service troops were attached as required.

===== Wakde–Sarmi and the Battle of Lone Tree Hill =====
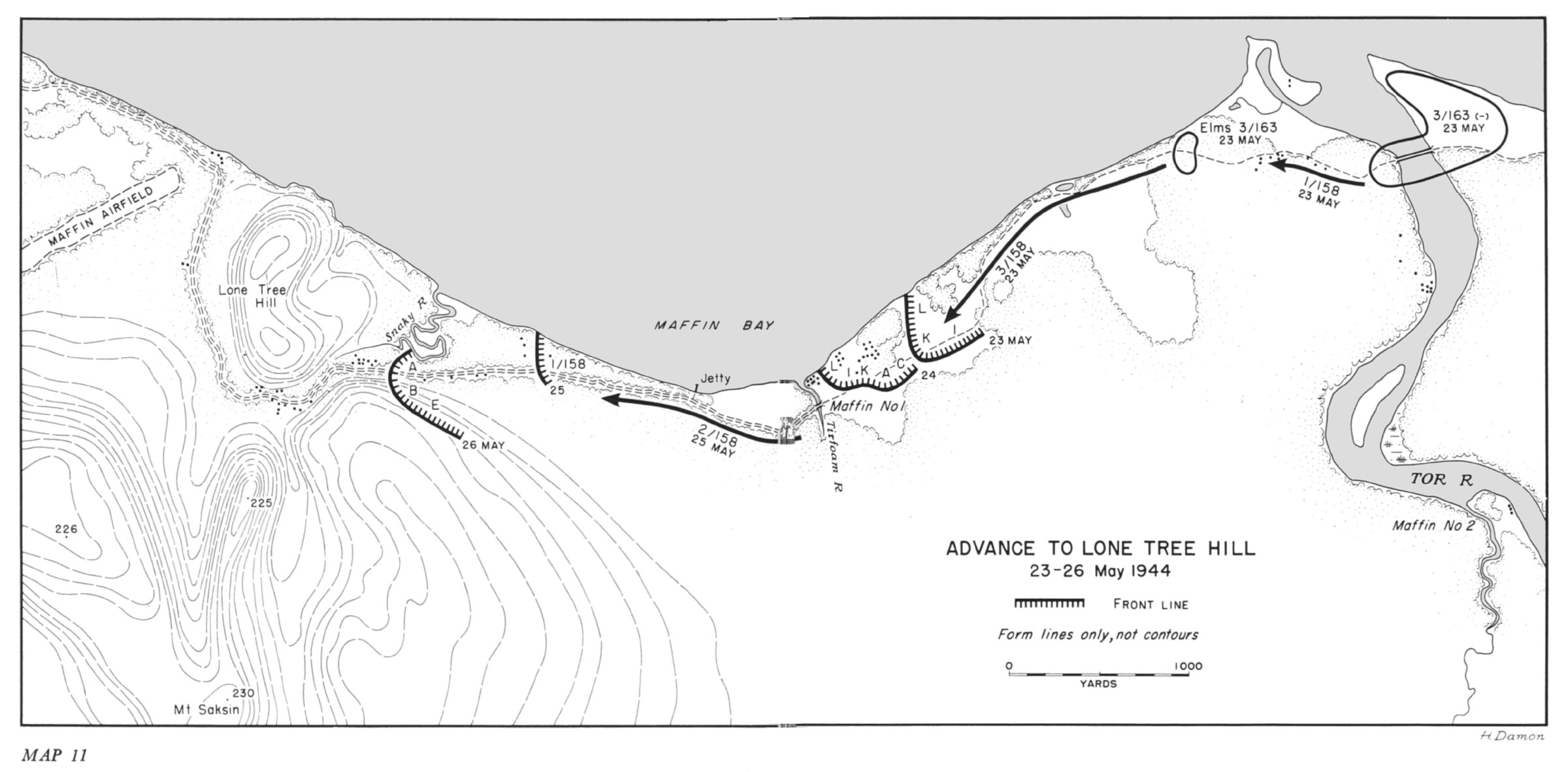
Advance of the 158th Regimental Combat Team toward Lone Tree Hill, 23–26 May 1944. The map shows the movements of the 1st, 2nd and 3rd Battalions of the 158th Infantry during the Wakde–Sarmi campaign.

In May 1944 the 158th RCT was ordered to the Wakde–Sarmi area on the north coast of Netherlands New Guinea. The regiment arrived near Toem on 21 May and began relieving elements of the 163rd Regimental Combat Team. Its mission was to advance west along the narrow coastal corridor toward Sarmi and seize terrain controlling the Japanese airfield at Maffin Bay.

The Bushmasters were opposed by elements of Lieutenant General Hachiro Tagami's 36th Division, particularly troops of the 223rd and 224th Infantry Regiments. Japanese troops had established concealed positions throughout dense jungle and coral terrain around Maffin Bay and the feature the Americans named Lone Tree Hill. Other Japanese elements maneuvered through the jungle against the Bushmasters' flanks and rear, threatening the narrow supply route connecting the regiment with the Toem–Arara beachhead.

On 23 May the regiment crossed the Tor River and advanced west. Forward elements reached Maffin village but encountered sniper fire and increasingly organized resistance. The fighting intensified as the Bushmasters approached Lone Tree Hill and the Snaky River.

On 24 May, Staff Sergeant Clarence L. Smith of Company K ("King Company"), 3rd Battalion was serving as a communications guide when his platoon was stopped by a fortified Japanese position. Smith moved forward under fire, located the position and helped orient supporting infantry against it. When that effort failed, he guided a tank against the strongpoint and subsequently directed flamethrower teams that destroyed it. Later, despite exhaustion and having gone approximately sixteen hours without food, Smith volunteered to guide a patrol to assist another Bushmaster platoon under counterattack. He was killed during the action and posthumously awarded the Distinguished Service Cross.

On 25 May the 1st Battalion encountered strong Japanese positions near the eastern approaches to Lone Tree Hill. Japanese artillery, mortars, machine guns and small arms struck the advancing Bushmasters from concealed positions in the jungle and along the coral ridges. Twenty-two Americans were killed and 26 wounded during the day's fighting, almost all from the 1st Battalion.

The attack resumed on 26 May following naval gunfire and artillery preparation. Company B ("Baker Company") led the 1st Battalion westward. When Japanese fire from the southeastern portion of Lone Tree Hill stopped the advance, heavy machine guns from Company D ("Dog Company") were brought forward to suppress the wooded Japanese positions, allowing Baker Company to continue moving. Fighting frequently developed at close range in terrain where visibility was severely restricted by jungle growth.

Japanese resistance proved substantially stronger than had initially been anticipated. The Bushmasters were simultaneously attempting to advance west while Japanese forces infiltrated toward their rear and threatened the Toem–Arara beachhead. What had begun as an advance toward Sarmi therefore became both a battle for Lone Tree Hill and a fight to protect the regiment's own line of communications.

On 29 May, Technician Fifth Grade Dennis E. Pingel of the 147th Field Artillery Battalion was occupying a trench near Maffin with two other soldiers when a Japanese grenade landed among them. Pingel threw himself onto the grenade and absorbed the explosion with his body, saving the other soldiers. He was killed and posthumously awarded the Distinguished Service Cross.

The Japanese threat to the American rear culminated during the fighting around Arara on 30–31 May. On 30 May, Private First Class Jack W. Carson was manning a machine-gun position with eight other soldiers when a Japanese grenade landed inside the emplacement. Carson threw himself onto the grenade. Although severely wounded by the explosion, he resumed firing his weapon until he was killed by a Japanese bayonet during the close-quarters fighting. Carson's action protected the other men in the position, and he was posthumously awarded the Distinguished Service Cross.

On 31 May an estimated 75 to 100 Japanese soldiers attacked another Bushmaster perimeter under darkness and heavy cloud cover. According to the Distinguished Service Cross citation of Private First Class Hubert William Ashby, some of the attackers shouted in English for the Americans to hold their fire and entered the perimeter carrying explosives and mines.

Ashby was serving as an acting heavy-machine-gun gunner when a ruptured cartridge disabled his weapon after approximately 30 rounds. With Japanese troops already inside and immediately outside the perimeter, he fought with a Thompson submachine gun and pistol until his ammunition was exhausted. He then fought with a trench knife around the machine-gun position. Ashby's citation credited him with killing at least five Japanese soldiers. Twenty-four Japanese bodies were subsequently counted within seven yards of the American line and three more inside the perimeter. Ashby retained possession of the position and was awarded the Distinguished Service Cross.

On 11 June, First Lieutenant George William Butler volunteered to lead an assault against a Japanese force occupying entrenched positions within approximately 100 yards of the Bushmasters' defensive line. Butler personally led the attack and remained at the front as his men overran the position. He was killed near the end of the assault, which destroyed the entrenched enemy force, and was posthumously awarded the Distinguished Service Cross.

The 6th Infantry Division began relieving the 158th in June and continued the battle for Lone Tree Hill. The Bushmasters were relieved in mid-June to prepare for another amphibious operation.

During its operations in the Wakde–Sarmi area, the 158th RCT suffered 70 killed, 257 wounded and four missing. The combat team took 11 Japanese prisoners and estimated that approximately 920 enemy troops had been killed during its portion of the fighting.

===== Noemfoor Island =====
Javanese laborers who escaped Japanese control on Noemfoor Island are brought in by soldiers of the 158th Infantry Regiment during the July 1944 operation.

On 2 July 1944 the 158th RCT landed on Noemfoor Island as the principal infantry element of Cyclone Task Force. Its mission was to seize the island's airfields, beginning with Kamiri and Kornasoren, and secure them for Allied air operations supporting the advance toward the Philippines.

The Japanese garrison numbered fewer than approximately 2,000 men, of whom perhaps 900 were effective infantry. Its principal combat element was the 3rd Battalion, 219th Infantry Regiment, reinforced by elements of the 2nd Battalion, 219th Infantry and the 222nd Infantry Regiment of the Japanese 36th Division. The island garrison was commanded by Colonel Suesada Shimizu. Hundreds of Formosan and Javanese laborers were also present on the island.

The 1st and 2nd Battalions formed the principal assault force at Kamiri. The Bushmasters crossed the airfield and established themselves along a coral ridge beyond it. The 2nd Battalion encountered organized resistance approximately 500 yards east of the runway when around 40 Japanese troops emerged from a cave complex. The group was destroyed by Bushmaster small-arms and automatic-weapons fire and supporting amphibious vehicles.

The 1st Battalion met less opposition west of the airfield and pushed south toward the Kamiri River. The 3rd Battalion landed behind the assault force and joined clearing operations east of the airfield. By late afternoon all three battalions had established a beachhead approximately 3,000 yards wide extending to the Kamiri River.

On 3 July the 1st Battalion patrolled south of the river while the 2nd and 3rd Battalions advanced toward Kornasoren Airfield. The 3rd Battalion was temporarily delayed by a minefield until engineers opened a route. Many prepared Japanese positions had been abandoned following the preliminary bombardment and rapid American landing.

The resistance encountered during the initial assault was significantly lighter than at Wakde–Sarmi, although Japanese troops continued scattered resistance inland. The seizure of Noemfoor provided the Allies with airfields from which aircraft could support subsequent operations farther west.

==== Luzon campaign ====
===== Lingayen Gulf and advance on Damortis =====
Members of the 158th Regimental Combat Team approach Damortis, Luzon, during the January 1945 advance from Lingayen Gulf.

Chūkonhi memorial at Damortis, Luzon, Philippines. The approximately 15-foot obelisk was erected by the Imperial Japanese Army in 1942 following the Japanese conquest of the Philippines and bore the inscription Chūkonhi (忠魂碑), commemorating fallen Japanese soldiers. After the U.S. Army’s 158th Regimental Combat Team (“Bushmasters”) captured Damortis in January 1945, Bushmaster soldiers repainted the monument with the words “TAKEN BY THE 158th RCT ‘Bushmasters’ 13th JAN ’45.”

The 158th RCT returned to combat on Luzon in January 1945. On 11 January, two days after the principal Lingayen Gulf landings, the combat team came ashore on the northern flank of I Corps. The 158th initially moved north along the coastal road and was subsequently attached to the 43rd Infantry Division.

The regiment's principal objective became the Damortis–Rosario road and the junction of Routes 3 and 11 east of Rosario. Control of the junction would protect Sixth Army's northern flank and open an important avenue toward Baguio through the Bued River valley.

The Japanese defense of the sector was centered on the 58th Independent Mixed Brigade. Approximately 6,000 Japanese troops occupied the Damortis–Rosario area, with infantry and supporting artillery positioned among ridges, ravines, caves and tunnel systems overlooking the road. Allied naval gunfire, aircraft and artillery had driven many defenders from exposed coastal positions into reverse-slope and defilade positions that were difficult to observe from the west.

Patrols entered Damortis and found little resistance, and the town was occupied as the regiment prepared for its attack east toward Rosario.

===== Bloody Sunday =====
The attack began on the morning of 14 January 1945. It progressed for approximately five minutes before the leading elements entered a shallow defile about one-half mile east of the Damortis coastal-road junction. Japanese artillery and mortar fire struck the highway while machine-gun fire swept the exposed slopes on either side.

Arizona National Guard accounts identify Company A ("Able Company") as leading the advance with Company C ("Charlie Company") following. Charlie Company came under intense fire while crossing exposed rice paddies. Able Company, farther forward along the road, became partially isolated and was subjected to additional Japanese artillery fire.

The forward companies withdrew from their exposed positions during the afternoon. The 158th lost 20 soldiers killed and 65 wounded. The engagement became known among Bushmaster veterans as "Bloody Sunday".

Wounded soldiers of the 158th Regimental Combat Team wait for litter bearers near Damortis, Luzon, on 14 January 1945, during the fighting remembered by Bushmaster veterans as "Bloody Sunday".

Guadalupe “Lupe” Lopez of Company C, 158th Infantry Regiment, who was awarded the Silver Star for his actions during the 14 January 1945 fighting near Damortis, Luzon.

One of the soldiers distinguished during the withdrawal was Guadalupe "Lupe" Lopez of Charlie Company, a Tucson native. Assigned to the rear guard, Lopez repeatedly returned under heavy fire to assist wounded Bushmasters and helped carry them to evacuation vehicles. His actions were credited with saving lives, and he was subsequently awarded the Silver Star.

Members of the 1st Battalion, 158th Regimental Combat Team, rest with wounded soldiers near Damortis, Luzon, during the January 1945 fighting.

===== Battle for the Damortis–Rosario road =====
The Bushmasters resumed the attack on 15 January, supported by the 147th Field Artillery Battalion's 105-mm howitzers, naval gunfire and carrier-based aircraft. The regiment gained approximately 1,000 yards east of Damortis on both sides of Route 3.

The advance then became a prolonged series of attacks against ridges and defiles commanding the road. By 17 January the regiment had advanced approximately 1.25 mi (2.01 km) east but encountered another Japanese defensive system near Amlang. A reinforced Japanese company occupied the ridge north of the road while additional elements of the 58th Independent Mixed Brigade held high ground to the south and east.

A wounded soldier of the 158th Regimental Combat Team receives plasma at a frontline aid position in the Philippines during the 1945 Luzon campaign.

The 158th coordinated its operations with the 63rd and 172nd Infantry Regiments. From 17 through 23 January the Bushmasters and the 63rd fought to clear the ridge systems around Amlang and the approaches to Rosario. During this phase the two American regiments suffered approximately 50 killed and 300 wounded, while the Japanese 58th Independent Mixed Brigade lost an estimated 650 killed.

Among the Bushmasters killed during these operations was Staff Sergeant Roy Hoahtewa. On 25 January his company was attacking a hill occupied by concealed Japanese positions when Hoahtewa, a squad leader, moved ahead to draw enemy fire and reveal their locations. From an exposed position approximately 75 yards from the Japanese line he directed American fire until he was killed by enemy shellfire. Hoahtewa was posthumously awarded the Silver Star.

The fighting continued across open hills and ridges under Japanese machine-gun, mortar and artillery fire. The Damortis–Rosario road was progressively opened and Japanese positions protecting the Routes 3–11 junction were reduced during the final week of January.

===== Company G and the Japanese heavy guns =====
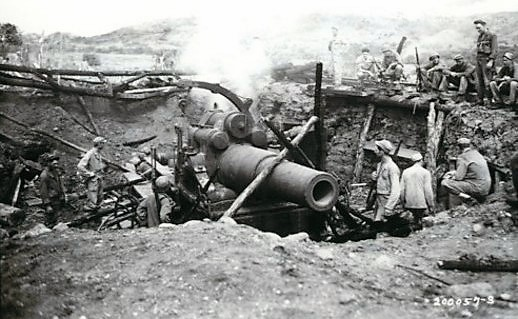
One of two Japanese 30 cm howitzers captured near Damortis, northern Luzon, by Company G, 158th Infantry.

Japanese heavy artillery remained a serious threat to American forces in the Damortis–Rosario sector. During heavy fighting on 1–2 February, Company G ("George Company") attacked fortified positions associated with two Japanese 30 cm howitzers that had been firing on American troops. The company captured the guns and was credited with killing 164 Japanese soldiers. For the action Company G was awarded the Presidential Unit Citation.

The regiment continued patrolling and repelling Japanese attempts to infiltrate the Rosario sector during early February. Three counterattacks were reported on 7 February, with further infiltration attempts on 8 February. The 158th continued destroying isolated Japanese groups until it was relieved by elements of the 33rd Infantry Division on 14 February.

==== Batangas campaign ====
After a short period out of the line, the 158th RCT was attached to the 11th Airborne Division for operations in Batangas Province. Beginning on 7 March 1945, the Bushmasters advanced southeast toward Balayan Bay and then eastward along the southern approaches to the Lipa corridor.

The regiment's mission was to clear the shores of Balayan and Batangas Bays, secure the Calumpang Peninsula, close Japanese routes through southern Batangas and ultimately establish contact with American forces operating toward the Lipa area.

The 158th reached the vicinity of Balayan on 7 March and Lemery on 8 March. On 9 March the regiment overcame resistance around Botong and sent patrols toward San Nicolas on Taal Lake. The Bushmasters continued east toward Batangas Bay, occupying Bauan and subsequently entering Batangas town.

Resistance increased significantly as the regiment moved inland. Japanese troops occupied fortified terrain around Camp McGrath, Mount Muntintubig, Cuenca and Mount Macolod. The Japanese force defending the Macolod area was estimated at approximately 1,250 men and possessed unusually heavy supporting weapons, including a large-caliber artillery piece, two 70-mm guns, ten or more 81-mm mortars, lighter mortars, machine guns and automatic cannon, some removed from disabled Japanese aircraft.

On 16 March elements of the 158th conducted an amphibious movement to Dagatan and advanced toward Mabini. Mabini and Mount Muntintubig were secured on 17 March, and Bushmaster troops repelled a Japanese counterattack near Mabini the following day.

On 20 March, the regiment attacked toward Cuenca and Mount Macolod. Sergeant Walter Whitlow, serving as an acting platoon leader in Company A ("Able Company"), 1st Battalion, encountered heavy Japanese sniper, machine-gun and mortar fire from concealed positions in wooded terrain near Cuenca. The position had stopped the battalion's advance.

Whitlow organized his platoon and an attached squad for a wide flanking movement while another platoon provided supporting fire. His force moved approximately 1,000 yards, much of it by crawling, before establishing an assault position. Within approximately 150 yards of the Japanese defenses the Bushmasters fought at close range for nearly an hour until the strongpoint was destroyed, allowing 1st Battalion to resume its advance. Whitlow was awarded the Distinguished Service Cross.

Heavy fighting continued on 21 and 22 March as the Bushmasters gained San Jose Hill, Cuenca and positions on the southwestern approaches to Mount Macolod. Before the remaining Japanese defenses on the mountain could be reduced, the 158th was ordered to disengage and prepare for another amphibious operation.

The 11th Airborne Division assumed responsibility for completing the reduction of Japanese forces around Mount Macolod. On 25 March the 158th RCT reverted to Sixth Army control at Lemery.

==== Bicol Peninsula campaign ====
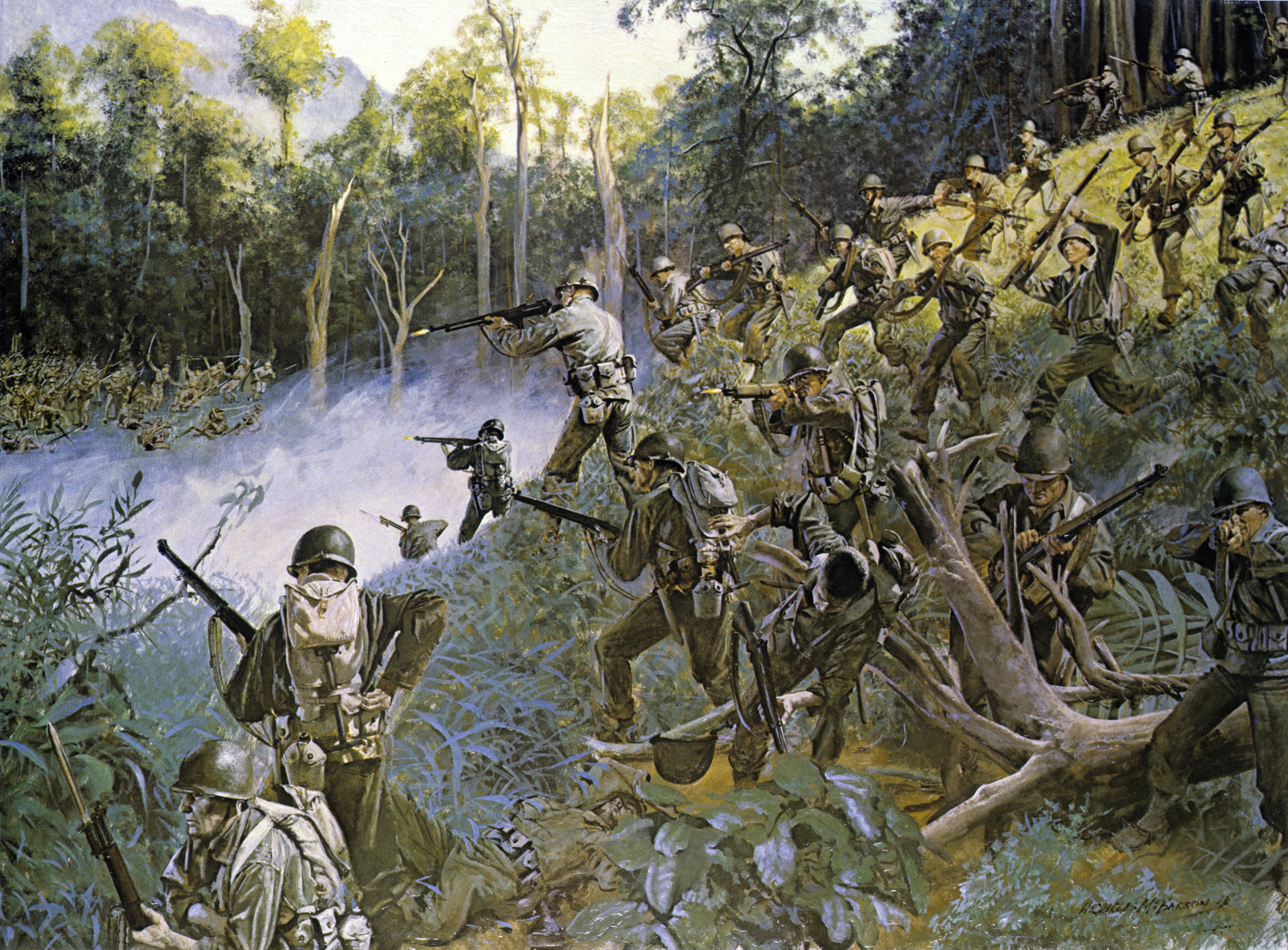
"Cuidado - Take Care, Bushmasters!" A painting depicting the 158th during the Bicol Campaign on Luzon, Philippine Islands, 3-4 April 1945.

===== Legaspi landings and Daraga =====
The 158th RCT landed at Legaspi on 1 April 1945 to begin operations to clear the Bicol Peninsula and open the Visayan sea passages to Allied shipping. The combat team numbered more than 5,000 personnel for the operation and again operated as a reinforced independent force under Brigadier General Hanford MacNider.

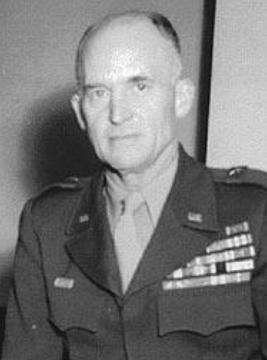
Brigadier General Hanford MacNider, commander of the 158th Regimental Combat Team during the Bicol Peninsula campaign.

The landing encountered little opposition on the beach, but Japanese artillery engaged the landing area and resistance developed inland around Legaspi, Daraga and Mount Linguion. The Bushmasters secured Legaspi and its airfield on 2 April and attacked Mount Linguion, which was captured on 3 April.

During the following week the regiment advanced around Daraga and the Yawa River valley. Japanese troops occupied mutually supporting positions in hilly and heavily vegetated terrain west and southwest of the town. Bushmaster units maneuvered against the flanks of these positions while artillery and other supporting weapons engaged identified strongpoints.

By 10–11 April the Japanese defenses around Daraga were collapsing. The regiment captured substantial supply dumps and pushed toward Camalig.

===== Sorsogon and outlying islands =====
While the main body fought around Daraga, the 2nd Battalion operated south through Sorsogon Province. Bushmaster forces occupied Sorsogon and patrolled toward Matnog and the San Bernardino Strait. Additional amphibious patrols and detachments cleared or reconnoitered Rapu-Rapu, Batan, Cagraray, San Miguel and other nearby islands and coastal areas.

These operations helped secure the northern side of the San Bernardino Strait and reduced the ability of surviving Japanese forces in southern Bicol to interfere with Allied shipping. The 2nd Battalion later returned north to rejoin the main body for the principal fight around Camalig.

===== Cituinan Hills and the Camalig pocket =====
On 11 April elements of the 158th entered Camalig after maneuvering around Japanese defenses in the nearby Cituinan Hills. General MacNider judged that leaving the position intact would threaten Route 1 behind the regiment and therefore endanger the combat team's supply line back to Legaspi.

On 12 April the 1st and 3rd Battalions began attacks against the Cituinan Hills. The terrain was exceptionally difficult: thick jungle covered steep slopes and ridges, restricting observation and movement while providing concealment for Japanese bunkers, machine guns and individual fighting positions. Japanese troops repeatedly counterattacked at night while Bushmaster patrols attempted to identify routes around and through the defensive system.

Progress remained slow. The two battalions fought through the hill mass for approximately a week without eliminating the position. On 19 April the 2nd Battalion returned from Sorsogon and joined the attack, allowing all three infantry battalions of the regiment to concentrate against the Camalig pocket.

The Bushmasters increasingly converged on the Japanese defenses from several directions. The Army combat chronicle records continued heavy resistance through 22–23 April and local gains during the following days. Organized resistance finally collapsed at the end of April.

The Cituinan Hills fighting cost the 158th approximately 40 killed and 235 wounded, while approximately 700 Japanese soldiers were estimated to have been killed. The destruction of the position effectively broke the principal organized Japanese resistance confronting the regiment in the central Bicol Peninsula.

===== Advance through Bicol and linkup with the 1st Cavalry Division =====
After clearing the Camalig pocket, the main body of the regiment resumed its movement northwest on 29 April. Remaining Japanese forces were increasingly fragmented and frequently abandoned prepared positions rather than contest the Bushmaster advance in strength.

On 1–2 May the regiment advanced across the Pawili River toward Pili and Naga. Patrols of the 158th established contact with elements of the 5th Cavalry Regiment, 1st Cavalry Division, near San Agustin. The linkup connected American forces advancing from opposite ends of the Bicol Peninsula and opened the principal land route through the region.

Bushmaster patrols subsequently searched the slopes of Mount Isarog and other areas where surviving Japanese troops had dispersed. In mid-May the 158th reported that organized Japanese resistance in the Bicol provinces had ceased.

The 158th and attached forces continued patrol, security and guerrilla-support operations into June. The campaign secured the Bicol Peninsula and helped complete the opening of the Visayan passages to Allied shipping.

==== Planned invasion and occupation of Japan ====
After the Luzon campaign the 158th was selected for participation in the planned invasion of Japan. Under planning associated with Operation Downfall, the Bushmasters were intended to participate in preliminary operations connected with the invasion of Kyushu, including a proposed seizure of Tanegashima. Japan surrendered before the operation could be executed.

Instead, the regiment entered Japan as part of the occupation force. The 158th RCT landed at Yokohama in October 1945 and performed occupation duties in Tochigi Prefecture and the Utsunomiya area. By January 1946 elements of the 97th Infantry Division had begun relieving the combat team of its occupation responsibilities.

The 158th Regimental Combat Team was inactivated at Utsunomiya, Japan, in January 1946.

General Douglas MacArthur was later quoted as describing the Bushmasters with the words, "No greater fighting combat team has ever deployed for battle."

==== Bushmaster Day ====
During World War II, Arizona governor Sidney P. Osborn proclaimed 28 January 1944 as “Bushmaster Day” in honor of the 158th Infantry Regiment. Osborn encouraged Arizonans to observe the occasion by purchasing war bonds to help the state meet its $30 million quota during the Fourth War Loan campaign.

Governor Sidney P. Osborne’s Bushmaster Day Proclamation for Jan 28th

More than two decades later, Governor Jack Williams proclaimed 3 December 1967 as Bushmaster Day in recognition of the regiment and its service. The proclamation preceded the 10 December 1967 reorganization in which the 158th Infantry’s battalions were converted into military-police and transportation organizations.

Governor Jack Williams Bushmaster Day Proclamation for December 3rd

=== 1947 to present ===
==== Postwar reorganization and reactivation ====
On 18 February 1947, the 158th Infantry was reorganized and federally recognized in the Arizona National Guard with its headquarters at Tucson. It became a parent regiment under the Combat Arms Regimental System in 1959 and was reorganized in 1963 to comprise the 1st, 2nd and 3rd Battalions.

The regiment was broken up on 10 December 1967. Its 1st Battalion was converted into the 1581st Military Police Battalion, redesignated as the 158th Military Police Battalion in 1969 and as Headquarters and Headquarters Detachment, 158th Military Police Group, in 1975. In 1976, the organization was converted into the 2nd Battalion, 180th Field Artillery. A 1992 reorganization consolidated it into the 180th Field Artillery lineage.

On 1 September 2005, the organization was converted back to infantry as the 158th Infantry, a parent regiment under the United States Army Regimental System, consisting of the 1st Battalion. It was redesignated as the 158th Infantry Regiment one month later.

This official lineage explains why the modern battalion passed through military-police and field-artillery designations before returning to the historic infantry number. The 158th Maneuver Enhancement Brigade is a separate Arizona Army National Guard headquarters whose organizational history developed through the former 258th Infantry Brigade and later support organizations. It is not a redesignation of the 1st Battalion, 158th Infantry, although it currently serves as the battalion's Arizona headquarters.

The infantrymen of the 158th Infantry Regiment, return drenched in sweat from a dismounted night patrol conducted July 18 in the Aleshang Valley of Laghman province, Afghanistan

==== 2007–2008 Afghanistan deployment ====
The reactivated battalion entered federal service on 3 January 2007 and deployed to Afghanistan as a force of approximately 692 soldiers drawn principally from the Arizona and Hawaii Army National Guards. After mobilization training at Fort Bragg, North Carolina, the battalion arrived in Afghanistan in late March. Battalion headquarters assumed responsibility for the Provincial Reconstruction Team at Mehtar Lam in Laghman Province on 11 April 2007.

A Soldier from 2nd Platoon, Company B, 1st Battalion, 158th Infantry Regiment, Arizona National Guard, who provides security and maneuver support to the Khowst PRT.

The battalion performed two principal missions: conducting infantry operations in Laghman Province and providing security forces for provincial reconstruction teams elsewhere in Afghanistan. In Laghman, Bushmasters conducted mounted and dismounted patrols with Afghan security forces, searched for improvised-explosive-device manufacturing sites and established a combat outpost in the Alishang Valley to extend the Afghan government's presence into an area used by insurgents.

During the deployment, the battalion distributed security-force elements among thirteen Provincial Reconstruction Teams. Battalion headquarters and 1st Platoon, Company B operated with PRT Mehtar Lam in Laghman Province; 2nd Platoon, Company B supported PRT Khowst; and 3rd Platoon, Company B supported PRT Qalat from FOB Lagman in Zabul Province. Company A supplied security forces to PRT Ghazni and PRT Paktika at FOB Sharana, Company C operated with PRT Nuristan from FOB Kalagush, and Company D served as the security element of PRT Farah. Other battalion elements supported PRT operations in Paktya Province, while an HHC maneuver element conducted patrol and quick-reaction missions. The scattered deployment required Bushmaster platoons to protect PRT installations, escort reconstruction and civil-affairs personnel, secure convoys and project sites, and respond to enemy activity across widely separated provinces..

Members of 2nd Platoon, Company A, 1st Battalion, 158th Infantry Regiment, and Provincial Reconstruction Team Ghazni personnel in a commemorative photograph honoring USDA agricultural adviser Steven Thomas Stefani IV (inset right), killed by an improvised explosive device on 4 October 2007, and U.S. Navy Lieutenant Jeffrey Alan Ammon (inset left), killed by an improvised explosive device on 20 May 2008.

Second Platoon, Company A assisted in recovering the remains of South Korean hostage and pastor Bae Hyeong-gyu in Qarabagh District. The platoon also guarded Afghan president Hamid Karzai while he addressed a gathering in Andar District on 10 June 2007. Taliban forces fired rockets at the gathering, but Karzai was unhurt and completed his speech.

On 4 October 2007, United States Department of Agriculture employee Steven Thomas Stefani was killed by a roadside bomb while accompanying Second Platoon, Company A in Ghazni Province.

Staff Sergeant Charles R. Browning (left), 1st Squad, 1st Platoon, Company B, 1st Battalion, 158th Infantry—killed in action near Mehtar Lam, Laghman Province, on 1 June 2007; and Private First Class Mykel F. Miller (right), 3rd Squad, 3rd Platoon, Company B, 1st Battalion, 158th Infantry—killed in action in Zabul Province on 6 September 2007.

Two Company B soldiers were killed in action during the deployment. Staff Sergeant Charles R. Browning, a team leader in 1st Squad, 1st Platoon, was killed on 1 June 2007 when his vehicle was struck by a second improvised explosive device while responding to an earlier bombing near Mehtar Lam in Laghman Province. Private First Class Mykel F. Miller, a member of 3rd Squad, 3rd Platoon and Provincial Reconstruction Team Qalat, was killed on 6 September 2007 when an improvised explosive device struck his vehicle during a ground-assault convoy mission in Zabul Province.

The battalion continued its operations through the winter. On 23 February 2008, Bushmasters participated in the rescue of United States senators John Kerry, Joe Biden and Chuck Hagel after their helicopter made an emergency landing in the mountains because of a blizzard. The battalion returned to the United States in 2008.

==== 2009–2010 Paktika deployment ====
1-158th IN FWD Platoon (Paktika) Conducting a dismounted foot patrol in Paktika Province, Afghanistan

In April 2009, the Bushmasters provided a platoon of volunteers for deployment to Afghanistan with the Nevada Army National Guard's 1st Squadron, 221st Cavalry Regiment. The squadron entered federal active service on 15 April 2009 in support of Operation Enduring Freedom. More than 700 soldiers participated in the mobilization, including personnel from five Nevada cavalry units, supporting platoons from Arizona, Arkansas, Guam and Georgia, and individual volunteers.

The deployed squadron had two principal missions. Approximately 250 soldiers operated in Laghman Province under the 4th Infantry Division, where they supported the development of the Afghan National Security Forces, conducted operations against insurgent forces and worked to extend the authority of the Afghan government. The remainder of the task organization supplied security-force platoons to eleven United States-supported Provincial Reconstruction Teams across Afghanistan. These platoons protected PRT personnel, installations, convoys and project sites while reconstruction and governance missions were conducted outside coalition bases.

The Bushmaster platoon served as a security-force element for Provincial Reconstruction Team Paktika and conducted security and combat operations in Paktika Province, including mounted and dismounted patrols in and around Sharana. A National Guard photograph taken in December 2009 documents a soldier from the 1st Battalion, 158th Infantry providing security during a PRT Paktika mission in Sharana. Department of the Army records also identify a detachment of the 1st Battalion, 158th Infantry as an attached element of Headquarters and Headquarters Troop, 1st Squadron, 221st Cavalry Regiment.

The Bushmaster platoon encountered multiple improvised explosive device incidents during the deployment. Sergeant First Class Joseph Masseur was severely wounded when his MRAP vehicle rolled over an improvised explosive device. He sustained severe injuries to both legs and a traumatic brain injury. After several operations, his treatment ultimately included the amputation of his left leg below the knee.

During the deployment, the Bushmaster platoon operated from two locations in Paktika Province. Three squads were based at Forward Operating Base Sharana and conducted missions from that installation, while one squad was stationed at Forward Operating Base Orgun-E and conducted operations in the surrounding area. Every member of the platoon was individually inducted into the cavalry’s Order of the Spur and received gold combat spurs in recognition of combat service with the 1st Squadron, 221st Cavalry Regiment.

Across the full 1-221 Cavalry task organization, soldiers conducted more than 6,200 mounted, dismounted and air-mobile combat patrols, raids and other missions. Squadron personnel received 44 Bronze Star Medals and 47 Purple Hearts during the deployment. Headquarters and Headquarters Troop and its listed attached units, including the 1-158 Infantry detachment, received the Meritorious Unit Commendation for service from 21 July 2009 through 21 March 2010.

The squadron's main body returned to Las Vegas on 1 April 2010 and entered the demobilization process. Nevada National Guard reporting subsequently described the year-long activation as concluding in May 2010. The Bushmaster platoon returned to Arizona as its mobilization and demobilization period concluded.

==== 2010–2011 Farah deployment ====
Soldiers from 1-158th IN FWD PLT (Farah) Conducting overwatch in Farah City, Afghanistan

In July 2010, another Bushmaster platoon began mobilization for deployment to Afghanistan in support of the Massachusetts Army National Guard's 1st Battalion, 181st Infantry Regiment. More than 670 soldiers of the parent battalion were honored at a send-off ceremony in Worcester, Massachusetts, on 1 August 2010. The deployment was described as the largest Massachusetts National Guard battalion deployment since World War II.

The 1-181 Infantry was assigned to provide security forces to twelve provincial reconstruction teams operating throughout Afghanistan. These teams worked to support reconstruction projects and extend the authority of the Afghan central government. The dispersed mission placed soldiers from the parent battalion at PRTs across the country, while other battalion elements supported security and humanitarian operations in the Kabul area. Contemporary issues of the battalion's Around the Powder Horn newsletter documented 1-181 personnel supporting PRT operations in Kunar, Nuristan, Kapisa, Ghazni, Khost, Laghman and Zabul provinces, in addition to operations around Kabul.

The attached Bushmaster platoon conducted security and combat operations in Farah Province. Its missions included protecting Provincial Reconstruction Team personnel, conducting mounted and dismounted patrols, providing convoy and route security, and establishing a squad sized element to maintain a combat outpost in Farah City. Department of the Army records confirm that a detachment of the 1st Battalion, 158th Infantry was attached to Headquarters and Headquarters Company, 1st Battalion, 181st Infantry Regiment during the deployment.

The parent battalion's PRT-security mission required its soldiers to accompany military and civilian specialists beyond established bases, protect reconstruction personnel and permit the teams to operate in areas threatened by insurgent activity and improvised explosive devices. Battalion publications documented security patrols, infrastructure projects, humanitarian missions and support to Afghan communities conducted by elements of the parent organization.

The 1-181 Infantry and its listed attached elements, including the 1-158 Infantry detachment, received the Meritorious Unit Commendation for service in Afghanistan from 24 October 2010 through 15 July 2011. Elements of the parent battalion returned to Massachusetts during the final week of July 2011; Company C was welcomed home on 24 July before beginning out-processing. Members of the Bushmaster platoon subsequently completed their demobilization and transition from federal active-duty status, with their orders extending into October 2011.

==== Interdeployment training ====
Arizona Army National Guard soldiers assigned to the 1st Battalion, 158th Infantry Regiment distribute soft drinks to friendly role-players during a key-leader engagement and simulated village assessment at the Joint Multinational Readiness Center in Hohenfels, Bavaria, Germany, 12 October 2014. (U.S. Army photo by Sgt. Tracy R. Myers)

Following the Afghanistan deployments, the battalion continued combat-readiness and multinational training. In 2014, soldiers of the 1st Battalion trained alongside Kazakhstani and Moldovan forces during Exercise Steppe Eagle at the Joint Multinational Readiness Center in Hohenfels, Germany. The Bushmasters were tasked with helping train the Kazakhstani Peacekeeping Battalion in crowd control and other peacekeeping operations.

The battalion also conducted air-assault, urban-operations and combined-arms training in Arizona while preparing for subsequent overseas missions.

==== 2018–2019 Middle East and Afghanistan deployments ====
Soldiers of the 1st Battalion, 158th Infantry Regiment stand in formation during their deployment ceremony on 7 July 2018, before departing for the Middle East in support of Operation Spartan Shield.

More than 400 soldiers of the 1st Battalion mobilized in July 2018. The battalion's principal deployment was in support of Operation Spartan Shield, where its missions included installation security, airfield and naval-facility protection and convoy escort operations.

Battalion elements also deployed to Afghanistan in support of Operation Freedom's Sentinel and NATO's Resolute Support Mission. Company C, based at Prescott, was documented serving in Afghanistan at Jalalabad in December 2018.

The battalion returned to Arizona in May 2019.

==== Southwest Border Mission ====
Following the battalion's return in 2019, a number of Bushmasters volunteered for orders supporting the Southwest Border Mission. Soldiers assigned to the mission assisted federal authorities with surveillance, logistical and administrative functions.

==== 2023–2024 Middle East deployment ====
Pfc. Matthew Arnold of Company C, 1st Battalion, 158th Infantry Regiment, stands in formation wearing the Purple Heart awarded to him for wounds sustained through enemy action, 3 March 2024. (U.S. Army photo by Sgt. Kadon Shelley)

The battalion deployed to the Middle East again in 2023–2024 in support of Operation Spartan Shield and Operation Inherent Resolve. Members of Company C were stationed at Tower 22 in northeastern Jordan when a one-way unmanned aircraft struck the installation on 28 January 2024.

The attack killed three soldiers of the United States Army Reserve's 926th Engineer Battalion and injured at least 41 National Guard personnel from several states, including members of the 1st Battalion, 158th Infantry.

More than 350 Arizona National Guard soldiers returned from the deployment in August 2024.

==== Current organization ====
The 1st Battalion, 158th Infantry is an Arizona Army National Guard battalion with relationships to two brigade-level headquarters. The Arizona Department of Emergency and Military Affairs identifies the 158th Maneuver Enhancement Brigade as the headquarters for the battalion. Separately, the Hawaii Army National Guard identifies the battalion as one of the infantry battalions comprising its 29th Infantry Brigade Combat Team, whose headquarters is at Kalaeloa, Hawaii. The two listings reflect the battalion's Arizona headquarters relationship and its alignment with the multi-state 29th IBCT for brigade organization and collective training.

The 29th served as a round-out brigade of the 25th Infantry Division from 1972 until 30 September 1986, when it became the 29th Infantry Brigade (Separate). It is therefore historically associated with the 25th Infantry Division but is not presently a subordinate brigade of that division.

== Commemoration and preservation ==
=== Fort Tuthill Military Museum ===
The Fort Tuthill Military Museum at the former Arizona National Guard training site south of Flagstaff preserves and interprets the history of the 158th Infantry from the territorial period through the modern battalion. The museum occupies original Fort Tuthill buildings and maintains exhibits, photographs, documents and veterans' recollections concerning the Bushmasters.

=== Bushmaster Park ===
Bushmaster Park in Flagstaff is named in memory of Company I, 158th Infantry Regiment

Wesley Bolin Memorial Plaza, Phoenix, AZ

=== Wesley Bolin Memorial Plaza ===
A monument honoring the Bushmasters stands in Wesley Bolin Memorial Plaza in downtown Phoenix. The monument was erected in 1985 and commemorates the service of the 158th Infantry and the 158th Regimental Combat Team.

=== Bushmaster Peak ===
Bushmaster Peak, Gates Pass, Tucson, AZ

Bushmaster Peak, near Gates Pass in Tucson Mountain Park, was named in honor of the regiment and its dead. Bushmaster veteran and Company B commander Harold "Hal" Braun helped secure the naming of the peak and promoted other public memorials to the unit.

=== Arizona State Route 64 ===
Arizona State Route 64 was designated the Bushmaster Memorial Highway in 1995 in honor of the 158th Infantry's World War II service.SR 64 stretches north from Williams to the Grand Canyon and then east to Cameron.

=== National Museum of the Pacific War Memorial ===
A memorial plaque honoring the 158th Regimental Combat Team stands in the World War II Veterans Memorial Courtyard at the National Museum of the Pacific War in Fredericksburg, Texas. The museum is a property of the Texas Historical Commission operated by the Admiral Nimitz Foundation.

The plaque traces the Bushmasters' service from their activation in 1940 through training, combat in the Southwest Pacific, occupation duty in Japan and inactivation in 1946. It identifies the 158th Infantry Regiment as the nucleus of the regimental combat team and names the 147th Field Artillery Battalion, 506th Medical Collecting Company and 1st Platoon, 637th Medical Clearing Company among its principal supporting elements. It also lists the regiment's service at Arawe, Wakde-Sarmi, Noemfoor, Lingayen Gulf, Batangas and Legaspi.

The plaque's location in Texas also recalls part of the regiment's preparation for war. After entering federal service and beginning training at Fort Sill, Oklahoma, the 158th Infantry moved to Camp Barkeley, near Abilene, Texas, in 1941. The regiment completed a training cycle there before being ordered to the Panama Canal Zone, where it arrived in January 1942 and developed the jungle-warfare identity associated with the Bushmaster name.

=== Browning–Miller Readiness Center ===

The Browning–Miller Readiness Center at Florence Military Reservation was named in memory of Staff Sergeant Charles R. Browning and Private First Class Mykel F. Miller, two soldiers of Company B, 1st Battalion, 158th Infantry who were killed in action during the battalion's 2007–2008 deployment to Afghanistan. Browning, a team leader in 1st Squad, 1st Platoon, Company B and a member of Provincial Reconstruction Team Mehtar Lam, was killed on 1 June 2007 when his vehicle was struck by a second improvised explosive device while responding to an earlier bombing near Mehtar Lam in Laghman Province. Miller, a member of 3rd Squad, 3rd Platoon, Company B and Provincial Reconstruction Team Qalat, was killed on 6 September 2007 when an improvised explosive device struck his vehicle during a ground-assault convoy mission in Zabul Province.

The center originated as Army National Guard military-construction project 040023. The fiscal year 2011 construction program authorized a $16.5 million readiness center on a proposed ten-acre site. It was intended to replace Company B's overcrowded leased facility in Gilbert and to support Company B, elements of the 29th Support Battalion and the 258th Engineer Company. The completed facility contains administrative and supply areas, classrooms, locker and shower rooms, training space, maintenance bays, an assembly hall and kitchen and dining facilities. It also includes approximately 7,200 sq ft (670 m^{2}) of shaded multipurpose space. The Arizona Department of Emergency and Military Affairs reported that the center was completed and dedicated during fiscal year 2014 and received LEED Gold certification. Company B continued to be based at Florence in the department's 2019 published force structure.

The center was also selected to preserve a battlefield memorial associated with Miller. A dining facility at Forward Operating Base Lagman in Qalat had been named for him. When the base was scheduled to close, soldiers arranged for its large memorial sign to be transported from Afghanistan to Arizona. The Arizona Army National Guard reported in 2013 that the sign was being refurbished for eventual display at the Browning–Miller Armory.

== Campaign streamers ==
=== Campaign credit ===
Conflict	Streamer	Year(s)
Indian Wars	Arizona	1866
World War I	Without Inscription	1918
World War II	New Guinea with Arrowhead	1943-44
World War II	Bismarck Archipelago	1943
World War II	Luzon with Arrowhead	1944-45
Afghanistan	OEF VIII	2007-2008

== Decorations ==
Ribbon	Award	Year	Notes
	Presidential Unit Citation (Army)	1945	Lingayen Gulf: Company G
	Meritorious Unit Commendation (Army)	2008	Southwest Asia: Headquarters and Headquarters Company and Company D
	Meritorious Unit Commendation (Army)	2018	Afghanistan
	Philippine Republic Presidential Unit Citation	1944-1945	Liberation of the Philippines

== Shoulder sleeve insignia and unit patches ==
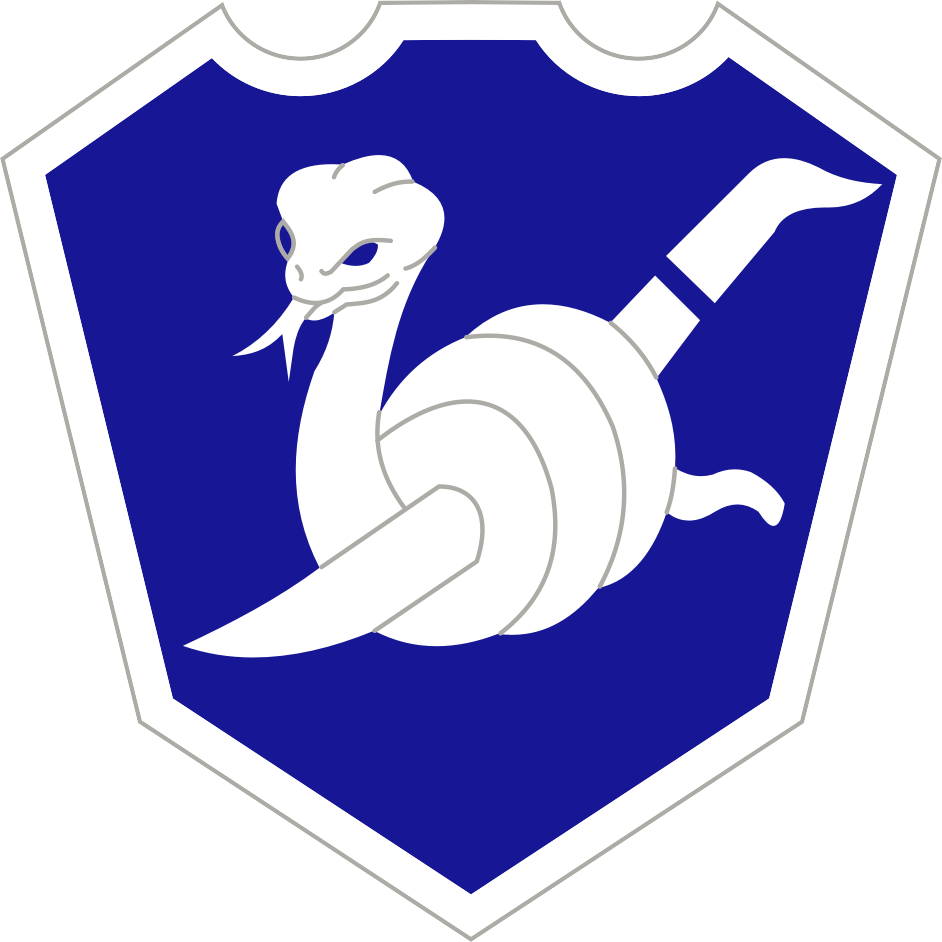
1-158th RCT Unit Insignia (Currently used by the 158th MEB)

During its Panama service the separate regiment adopted an unofficial shoulder sleeve insignia depicting a bushmaster snake coiled around a machete or bolo. The snake represented the dangerous Central American jungle in which the regiment trained, while the machete represented jungle movement and fieldcraft. The image became the identifying patch of the World War II 158th Regimental Combat Team and visually reinforced the warning expressed by the motto "Cuidado."

The historic snake-and-machete design is distinct from the 158th Infantry's distinctive unit insignia, which bears a Gila monster and the motto "CUIDADO." Soldiers of 1st Battalion, 158th Infantry wear the shoulder sleeve insignia of their operational headquarters, the 29th Infantry Brigade Combat Team, while retaining the 158th Infantry distinctive unit insignia and regimental identity.

The 158th Maneuver Enhancement Brigade uses a modern shoulder sleeve insignia derived from the Bushmaster image: a white bushmaster snake wrapped around a white machete on a blue shield. The Institute of Heraldry states that the snake and machete symbolize Canal Zone service and that the blue field recalls the organization's infantry heritage. The insignia was originally approved for the 258th Infantry Brigade in 1966, redesignated through later organizations and redesignated for the 158th Maneuver Enhancement Brigade effective 1 September 2010.

== Distinctive unit insignia ==
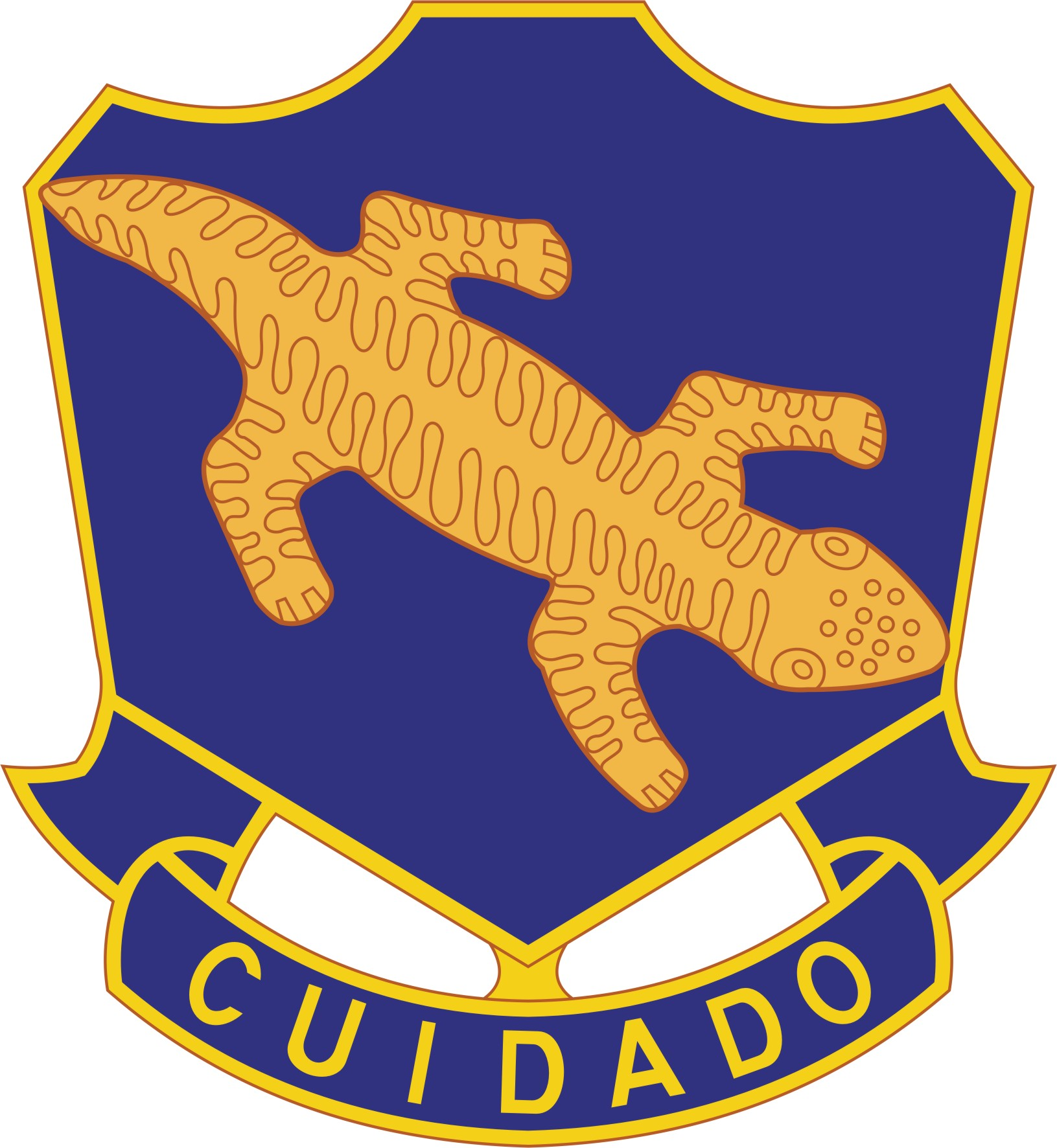
- Description

A gold color metal and enamel device 1 5/32 inches (2.94 cm) in height overall consisting of a blue shield charged with a Gila monster bendwise, head to base. Attached below the shield is a blue scroll inscribed "CUIDADO" in gold.

- Symbolism

The service of the former and current organization, the 158th Infantry Regiment is indicated by the Gila monster, indigenous to the State of Arizona, which is emblematic of tenacity and security. The color blue represents Infantry. It is also symbolic of loyalty and faith. The motto "CUIDADO" a Spanish word meaning "Take Care" is a caution first used by those serving in the regiment's progenitor, the 1st Arizona Volunteer Infantry.

- Background

The distinctive unit insignia was originally approved for the 158th Infantry Regiment, Arizona National Guard on 22 July 1924. It was amended to authorize its wear in pairs on 11 April 1926. It was redesignated for the 158th Regiment, Arizona Army National Guard with description and symbolism revised on 7 May 1998. The insignia was redesignated for the 158th Infantry Regiment, Arizona Army National Guard with symbolism revised on 22 November 2005.

== Coat of arms ==
- Blazon
  - Shield - Argent on a saltire Gules two arrows crossed of the field, in dexter fess a prickly pear cactus Vert and in sinister fess a fleur-de-lis Azure.
  - Crest - That for regiments and separate battalions of the Arizona Army National Guard: From a wreath Argent and Gules, a giant Saguaro cactus Proper.
  - Motto - CUIDADO (Take Care).
- Symbolism
  - Shield - The service of the former and current organization, the 158th Infantry Regiment, is indicated by the white shield, which represents Infantry. The red saltire cross recalls the fact that the regiment was organized in 1865, under an order from the Provost Marshal General of the United States, and under authority granted for the raising of troops for the Civil War. The arrows indicate the regiment's early service in fighting the Apache Indians. The motto has two meanings or rather two applications - a warning to those who might oppose the regiment and a caution to those who belong to it.
  - Crest - The crest is that of the Arizona Army National Guard.
- Background - The coat of arms was originally approved for the 158th Infantry Regiment, Arizona Army National Guard on 26 July 1924. It was redesignated for the 1581st Military Police Battalion, Arizona Army National Guard on 14 August 1969. It was redesignated for the 158th Military Police Battalion, Arizona Army National Guard on 26 September 1969. It was redesignated for the 158th Regiment, Arizona Army National Guard on 29 April 1998. The insignia was redesignated for the 158th Infantry Regiment, Arizona Army National Guard with symbolism revised on 22 November 2005.

== Published Books ==
- Arthur, Anthony (1987). Bushmasters: America's Jungle Warriors of World War II. New York: St. Martin's Press. ISBN 9780312004538.
- Braun, Harold "Hal". Braun's Battlin' Bastards: The Bushmasters of Company B, 1st Battalion, 158th R.C.T.
- Krueger, Walter (1953). From Down Under to Nippon: The Story of Sixth Army in World War II. Washington, D.C.: Combat Forces Press.
- Lancaster, Roy (1945). The Story of the Bushmasters. Detroit: Lancaster Publications.
- Miller, John Jr. (1959). CARTWHEEL: The Reduction of Rabaul (PDF). United States Army in World War II. Washington, D.C.: Office of the Chief of Military History.
- Smith, Robert Ross (1953). The Approach to the Philippines (PDF). United States Army in World War II. Washington, D.C.: Office of the Chief of Military History.
- Smith, Robert Ross (1963). Triumph in the Philippines (PDF). United States Army in World War II. Washington, D.C.: Office of the Chief of Military History.
- Walthall, Melvin Curtis (1975). We Can't All Be Heroes: A History of the Separate Infantry Regiments in World War II. Hicksville, New York: Exposition Press.

== Bushmasters Who Made the Ultimate Sacrifice ==
The following roll combines combat and non-combat losses from most recent to oldest within each war or campaign. The classification printed for each person is retained where a source provides one; an entry marked MIA records a wartime loss and does not by itself resolve the individual's ultimate fate. The World War I and World War II tables use a broad memorial index as a starting point and should be reconciled against the regiment's original casualty records, including the Bushmasters' Association folder titled "Arizona Bushmasters: Killed, Died in Service."

=== Operation Enduring Freedom ===
Two members of Company B were killed in action during the 2007-2008 Afghanistan deployment.

Date	Name	Rank	Unit	Classification	Nature of death or loss
6 September 2007	Mykel F. Miller	Private First Class	3rd Squad, 3rd Platoon, Company B, 1st Battalion, 158th Infantry; PRT Qalat	KIA	Killed when an improvised explosive device struck his vehicle during a ground-assault convoy in Zabul Province
1 June 2007	Charles R. Browning	Staff Sergeant	Company B, 1st Battalion, 158th Infantry	KIA	Killed when an improvised explosive device struck his vehicle near Mehtar Lam, Laghman Province

=== World War II ===
The list includes the 158th Infantry and the principal supporting elements of the 158th RCT: the 147th Field Artillery Battalion and 506th Medical Collecting Company. Published classifications are reproduced as recorded.

Date	Name	Rank	Unit	Classification	Nature of death or loss
15 October 1945	Thomas E Buck	Private	158th Infantry Regiment	KIA	Killed in action; further circumstances not stated in the cited record
8 October 1945	Bruno R Bernardini	Private First Class	158th Infantry Regiment	KIA	Killed in action; further circumstances not stated in the cited record
5 October 1945	Leonard C Briones	Private First Class	158th Infantry Regiment	Not stated	Cause or classification not stated in the cited record
5 October 1945	Richard E Burke	Private First Class	158th Infantry Regiment	KIA	Killed in action; further circumstances not stated in the cited record
18 July 1945	Sarapio Baca	Private	158th Infantry Regiment	Not stated	Cause or classification not stated in the cited record
4 June 1945	Armogene Vincent	Private First Class	158th Infantry Regiment	KIA	Killed in action; further circumstances not stated in the cited record
30 April 1945	Gabriel Carrasco	Staff Sergeant	158th Infantry Regiment	KIA	Killed in action; further circumstances not stated in the cited record
29 April 1945	Basil O Hartwell	Technician Fourth Class	158th Infantry Regiment	KIA	Killed in action; further circumstances not stated in the cited record
26 April 1945	Frank E Hicks	Private	158th Infantry Regiment	KIA	Killed in action; further circumstances not stated in the cited record
26 April 1945	Hubert J Missey	Sergeant	158th Infantry Regiment	KIA	Killed in action; further circumstances not stated in the cited record
22 April 1945	Frank L Moulton	Private	158th Infantry Regiment	DOW	Died of wounds; further circumstances not stated in the cited record
22 April 1945	George V Evans	Staff Sergeant	158th Infantry Regiment	KIA	Killed in action; further circumstances not stated in the cited record
21 April 1945	Allen M Pratt	Private First Class	158th Infantry Regiment	KIA	Killed in action; further circumstances not stated in the cited record
21 April 1945	Harold A Millard	Private	158th Infantry Regiment	KIA	Killed in action; further circumstances not stated in the cited record
21 April 1945	James E Perkins	Private	158th Infantry Regiment	KIA	Killed in action; further circumstances not stated in the cited record
21 April 1945	Richard N Laws	Private First Class	158th Infantry Regiment	DOW	Died of wounds; further circumstances not stated in the cited record
20 April 1945	William Bernard Walsh	Staff Sergeant	158th Infantry Regimental Combat Team	KIA	Killed in action; further circumstances not stated in the cited record
19 April 1945	Frederick N Herd	Technical Sergeant	158th Infantry Regiment	KIA	Killed in action; further circumstances not stated in the cited record
17 April 1945	Paul H Kees	Private First Class	158th Infantry Regiment	KIA	Killed in action; further circumstances not stated in the cited record
16 April 1945	Joseph W Scheblo	Private First Class	158th Infantry Regiment	KIA	Killed in action; further circumstances not stated in the cited record
12 April 1945	Peter Richard Anderson	Private First Class	158th Infantry Regiment	KIA	Killed in action; further circumstances not stated in the cited record
8 April 1945	Doyce F. Morgan	Private First Class	Company L, 158th Infantry	KIA	Killed in action on Luzon
8 April 1945	Richard L Humphrey	Private	158th Infantry Regiment	DOW	Died of wounds; further circumstances not stated in the cited record
8 April 1945	Robert C Doherr	Private	158th Infantry Regiment	KIA	Killed in action; further circumstances not stated in the cited record
8 April 1945	Samuel H Grant	Staff Sergeant	158th Infantry Regiment	DOW	Died of wounds; further circumstances not stated in the cited record
7 April 1945	Antonio M Elizondo	Private First Class	158th Infantry Regiment	KIA	Killed in action; further circumstances not stated in the cited record
7 April 1945	Kenneth Charles Burkhard	Private First Class	158th Infantry Regiment, 45th Infantry Division	DOW	Died of wounds; further circumstances not stated in the cited record
7 April 1945	Raymond R Ulibarri	Private First Class	158th Infantry Regiment	KIA	Killed in action; further circumstances not stated in the cited record
7 April 1945	Trinidad R Ontiveros	Private First Class	158th Infantry Regiment	KIA	Killed in action; further circumstances not stated in the cited record
6 April 1945	Ivan L Rogers	Private	158th Infantry Regiment	KIA	Killed in action; further circumstances not stated in the cited record
5 April 1945	Everett D Gehb	Private First Class	158th Infantry Regiment	KIA	Killed in action; further circumstances not stated in the cited record
5 April 1945	Leroy V Schmidt	Private First Class	158th Infantry Regiment	KIA	Killed in action; further circumstances not stated in the cited record
5 April 1945	Robert L Coulson	Private First Class	158th Infantry Regiment	KIA	Killed in action; further circumstances not stated in the cited record
4 April 1945	Kenneth R Wahl	Private First Class	158th Infantry Regiment	DOW	Died of wounds; further circumstances not stated in the cited record
3 April 1945	Clarence A Thompson	Second Lieutenant	147th Field Artillery Battalion	DOW	Died of wounds; further circumstances not stated in the cited record
3 April 1945	Garnett H Miles Jr	Staff Sergeant	158th Infantry Regiment	KIA	Killed in action; further circumstances not stated in the cited record
3 April 1945	Jose C Moreno	Private First Class	158th Infantry Regiment	KIA	Killed in action; further circumstances not stated in the cited record
2 April 1945	Charles Stoyko	Private	147th Field Artillery Battalion	DNB	DNB - Died Non-battle
2 April 1945	William H Walgenbach	Staff Sergeant	158th Infantry Regiment	KIA	Killed in action; further circumstances not stated in the cited record
24 March 1945	Kenneth Irvin Knoll	First Lieutenant	158th Infantry Regiment	DOW	Died of wounds; further circumstances not stated in the cited record
22 March 1945	Sam J Earle	Private First Class	158th Infantry Regiment	KIA	Killed in action; further circumstances not stated in the cited record
20 March 1945	Abeslin C Chavez	Private First Class	158th Infantry Regiment	KIA	Killed in action; further circumstances not stated in the cited record
20 March 1945	Edward J O'Brien	Private First Class	158th Infantry Regiment	KIA	Killed in action; further circumstances not stated in the cited record
20 March 1945	Leroy L Buysse	Staff Sergeant	158th Infantry Regiment	KIA	Killed in action; further circumstances not stated in the cited record
19 March 1945	Ralph E Ford	Private	158th Infantry Regiment	KIA	Killed in action; further circumstances not stated in the cited record
17 March 1945	Joseph P Huber	Private	158th Infantry Regiment	KIA	Killed in action; further circumstances not stated in the cited record
16 March 1945	Eldon Arden Sorenson	Private	158th Infantry Regiment, 45th Infantry Division	KIA	Killed in action; further circumstances not stated in the cited record
15 March 1945	Dannel M Sanders	Private	158th Infantry Regiment	KIA	Killed in action; further circumstances not stated in the cited record
15 March 1945	Jose R Valdez	Private First Class	158th Infantry Regiment	KIA	Killed in action; further circumstances not stated in the cited record
15 March 1945	Raymond R Lockwood	Private First Class	158th Infantry Regiment	KIA	Killed in action; further circumstances not stated in the cited record
14 March 1945	William E Allen	Private	158th Infantry Regiment	KIA	Killed in action; further circumstances not stated in the cited record
13 March 1945	Elmer W Dougherty	Private	158th Infantry Regiment	KIA	Killed in action; further circumstances not stated in the cited record
12 March 1945	John E Mellett	Private	40th Division, 158th Infantry Regiment	KIA	Killed in action; further circumstances not stated in the cited record
12 March 1945	William G Horn	Private First Class	158th Infantry Regiment	KIA	Killed in action; further circumstances not stated in the cited record
11 March 1945	James McNeilly	Private	158th Infantry Regiment	Not stated	Cause or classification not stated in the cited record
7 March 1945	Robert L Gee	Private	158th Infantry Regiment	KIA	Killed in action; further circumstances not stated in the cited record
5 March 1945	Thomas B McMahon	Staff Sergeant	158th Infantry Regiment	KIA	Killed in action; further circumstances not stated in the cited record
7 February 1945	Samuel Cerny	Private First Class	158th Infantry Regiment	KIA	Killed in action; further circumstances not stated in the cited record
6 February 1945	Max D Smith	Master Sergeant	147th Field Artillery Battalion	DOW	Died of wounds; further circumstances not stated in the cited record
4 February 1945	Earl M Stevens	Private First Class	158th Infantry Regiment	DOW	Died of wounds; further circumstances not stated in the cited record
1 February 1945	Paul Schwartz	Sergeant	158th Infantry Regiment	DOW	Died of wounds; further circumstances not stated in the cited record
27 January 1945	Franklin H Tice	Private First Class	158th Infantry Regiment	Not stated	Cause or classification not stated in the cited record
25 January 1945	Nash Abeyta	Private First Class	158th Infantry Regiment	KIA	Killed in action; further circumstances not stated in the cited record
25 January 1945	Roy Hoahtewa	Staff Sergeant	158th Infantry Regiment	KIA	Killed in action; further circumstances not stated in the cited record
25 January 1945	Thomas A Gedig	Private	147th Field Artillery Battalion	Not stated	Cause or classification not stated in the cited record
25 January 1945	Thomas J Smith	Sergeant	158th Infantry Regiment	DOW	Died of wounds; further circumstances not stated in the cited record
24 January 1945	David G Long	Private First Class	158th Infantry Regiment	DOW	Died of wounds; further circumstances not stated in the cited record
24 January 1945	George Bouffleur	Private First Class	158th Infantry Regiment	KIA	Killed in action; further circumstances not stated in the cited record
24 January 1945	Guy W Huckaby	Private First Class	158th Infantry Regiment	Not stated	Cause or classification not stated in the cited record
24 January 1945	Verl Johnson	Staff Sergeant	158th Infantry Regiment	KIA	Killed in action; further circumstances not stated in the cited record
20 January 1945	Richard G Mitchell	Private First Class	158th Infantry Regiment	DOW	Died of wounds; further circumstances not stated in the cited record
19 January 1945	Charles H Folchert	Private First Class	158th Infantry Regiment	KIA	Killed in action; further circumstances not stated in the cited record
19 January 1945	Irvin E Ellis	Staff Sergeant	158th Infantry Regiment	KIA	Killed in action; further circumstances not stated in the cited record
19 January 1945	Raymond A Avery	Staff Sergeant	158th Infantry Regiment	KIA	Killed in action; further circumstances not stated in the cited record
17 January 1945	James R Goodman	Private First Class	158th Infantry Regiment	DOW	Died of wounds; further circumstances not stated in the cited record
16 January 1945	Alexander S Kazmark	Private	158th Infantry Regiment	KIA	Killed in action; further circumstances not stated in the cited record
16 January 1945	Henry John Passig	Sergeant	158th Infantry Regiment	KIA	Killed in action; further circumstances not stated in the cited record
16 January 1945	Jose B Soliz	Private First Class	158th Infantry Regiment	KIA	Killed in action; further circumstances not stated in the cited record
16 January 1945	Juan A Jaramillo	Private First Class	158th Infantry Regiment	KIA	Killed in action; further circumstances not stated in the cited record
16 January 1945	Le Roy Kinser	Private First Class	158th Infantry Regiment	KIA	Killed in action; further circumstances not stated in the cited record
15 January 1945	Howard M Harden	Private First Class	158th Infantry Regiment	DOW	Died of wounds; further circumstances not stated in the cited record
15 January 1945	John M Rowen	Private	506th Medical Collecting Company	KIA	Killed in action; further circumstances not stated in the cited record
15 January 1945	Kenneth Edwin Roland	Private First Class	Company E, 158th Infantry Regiment, 45th Infantry Division	KIA	Killed in action; further circumstances not stated in the cited record
14 January 1945	Bob Everett Sharp	Private First Class	158th Infantry Regiment	KIA	Killed in action; further circumstances not stated in the cited record
14 January 1945	Frank L Hernandez	Private First Class	158th Infantry Regiment	MIA	Missing in action; further circumstances not stated in the cited record
14 January 1945	Joe G Herrera	Sergeant	158th Infantry Regiment	KIA	Killed in action; further circumstances not stated in the cited record
14 January 1945	Joseph E Beauchesne	Private First Class	158th Infantry Regiment	MIA	Missing in action; further circumstances not stated in the cited record
14 January 1945	Louis W Wallitsch Jr	Private First Class	158th Infantry Regiment	KIA	Killed in action; further circumstances not stated in the cited record
14 January 1945	Richard A Hoglund	Technician Fifth Class	158th Infantry Regiment	KIA	Killed in action; further circumstances not stated in the cited record
14 January 1945	Robert Keith Walling	Private First Class	158th Infantry Regiment	KIA	Killed in action; further circumstances not stated in the cited record
14 January 1945	Walter G Amerson	Private First Class	158th Infantry Regiment	KIA	Killed in action; further circumstances not stated in the cited record
13 January 1945	Floyd Choate	Private	158th Infantry Regiment	KIA	Killed in action; further circumstances not stated in the cited record
12 January 1945	Fred H Marx	Corporal	158th Infantry Regiment	DOW	Died of wounds; further circumstances not stated in the cited record
11 January 1945	Fred L Martinez	Private First Class	158th Infantry Regiment	KIA	Killed in action; further circumstances not stated in the cited record
11 January 1945	Harold C Gilmore	Technician Fifth Class	158th Infantry Regiment	KIA	Killed in action; further circumstances not stated in the cited record
11 January 1945	Harry F Shinn	Private First Class	158th Infantry Regiment	Not stated	Cause or classification not stated in the cited record
6 October 1944	Burton Harry Boettcher	Second Lieutenant	158th Infantry Regiment	Died-non-battle, accident, gunshot wound	Died-non-battle, accident, gunshot wound
16 September 1944	Frank C Peshlakai	Private First Class	158th Infantry Regiment	KIA	Killed in action; further circumstances not stated in the cited record
30 August 1944	Phil Morton Domer	Private	158th Infantry Regiment	KIA	Killed in action; further circumstances not stated in the cited record
20 August 1944	Tony R Rios	Staff Sergeant	158th Infantry Regiment	DNB	DNB - Died Non-battle
2 August 1944	Anthony English	Private	147th Field Artillery Battalion	MIA	Missing in action; further circumstances not stated in the cited record
30 July 1944	Max Strnisha	Private First Class	158th Infantry Regiment	KIA	Killed in action; further circumstances not stated in the cited record
7 July 1944	Alcide J Lavoie	Private	147th Field Artillery Battalion	Not stated	Cause or classification not stated in the cited record
5 July 1944	Jack R Vogel	Private	158th Infantry Regiment	KIA	Killed in action; further circumstances not stated in the cited record
2 July 1944	Q Udell Edwards	Private First Class	158th Infantry Regiment	KIA	Killed in action; further circumstances not stated in the cited record
12 June 1944	Alexander Hall	Private First Class	158th Infantry Regiment	KIA	Killed in action; further circumstances not stated in the cited record
11 June 1944	George William Butler	First Lieutenant	158th Infantry Regiment	KIA	Killed in action; further circumstances not stated in the cited record
10 June 1944	Eli Osborne	Private First Class	158th Infantry Regiment	KIA	Killed in action; further circumstances not stated in the cited record
10 June 1944	James Wesley Parrish	First Lieutenant	Company C, 158th Regimental Combat Team	DOW	Wounded on 27 May 1944 and died of wounds on 10 June
10 June 1944	John L Busby	Private	158th Infantry Regiment	KIA	Killed in action; further circumstances not stated in the cited record
10 June 1944	Thomas S Velasquez	Private First Class	158th Infantry Regiment	DOW	Died of wounds; further circumstances not stated in the cited record
8 June 1944	Angel O Carbajal	Private First Class	158th Infantry Regiment	KIA	Killed in action; further circumstances not stated in the cited record
6 June 1944	Julian Vigil	Private First Class	158th Infantry Regiment	KIA	Killed in action; further circumstances not stated in the cited record
6 June 1944	Matthew D Good Shield	Private	6th Division, 158th Infantry Regiment	KIA	Killed in action; further circumstances not stated in the cited record
4 June 1944	Minard G Kaufman	Private	158th Infantry Regiment	KIA	Killed in action; further circumstances not stated in the cited record
1 June 1944	George P Barrier	Staff Sergeant	158th Infantry Regiment	KIA	Killed in action; further circumstances not stated in the cited record
31 May 1944	Phillip W Robinson	Private First Class	158th Infantry Regiment	KIA	Killed in action; further circumstances not stated in the cited record
31 May 1944	Richard A Di Cocco	Private First Class	158th Infantry Regiment	KIA	Killed in action; further circumstances not stated in the cited record
30 May 1944	Arthur A Schlageter	Technician Fifth Class	158th Infantry Regiment	KIA	Killed in action; further circumstances not stated in the cited record
30 May 1944	Jack W. Carson	Private First Class	158th Regimental Combat Team	KIA	Killed in action at Arara, Netherlands New Guinea; posthumously awarded the Distinguished Service Cross
30 May 1944	Joseph L Cerny	Private First Class	158th Infantry Regiment	KIA	Killed in action; further circumstances not stated in the cited record
29 May 1944	Billie B Jack	Private First Class	158th Infantry Regiment	MIA	Missing in action; further circumstances not stated in the cited record
29 May 1944	Dennis E Pingel	Technician Fifth Class	147th Field Artillery Battalion	KIA	Killed in action; further circumstances not stated in the cited record
28 May 1944	Domenico N Baronti	Private	158th Infantry Regiment	MIA	Missing in action; further circumstances not stated in the cited record
28 May 1944	Michael S Mancuso	Private	158th Infantry Regiment	MIA	Missing in action; further circumstances not stated in the cited record
28 May 1944	Romie L Spurlin	Private First Class	158th Infantry Regiment	KIA	Killed in action; further circumstances not stated in the cited record
27 May 1944	Hollis J Holt	Private First Class	147th Field Artillery Battalion	KIA	Killed in action; further circumstances not stated in the cited record
26 May 1944	Edward J Sintic	Private First Class	158th Infantry Regiment	KIA	Killed in action; further circumstances not stated in the cited record
26 May 1944	Fily Martinez	Private First Class	158th Infantry Regiment	KIA	Killed in action; further circumstances not stated in the cited record
26 May 1944	Loyd H Cawley	Private First Class	158th Infantry Regiment	KIA	Killed in action; further circumstances not stated in the cited record
26 May 1944	Warren O Perkins Jr	Staff Sergeant	158th Infantry Regiment	MIA	Missing in action; further circumstances not stated in the cited record
24 May 1944	Carlos O Peters	Private First Class	158th Infantry Regiment	KIA	Killed in action; further circumstances not stated in the cited record
24 May 1944	Charles Pohonich	Private First Class	158th Infantry Regiment	KIA	Killed in action; further circumstances not stated in the cited record
24 May 1944	Edward Carrillo	Private First Class	158th Infantry Regiment	KIA	Killed in action; further circumstances not stated in the cited record
24 May 1944	Everett E King	Private	158th Infantry Regiment	KIA	Killed in action; further circumstances not stated in the cited record
24 May 1944	Glenn A Sire	Staff Sergeant	158th Infantry Regiment	KIA	Killed in action; further circumstances not stated in the cited record
24 May 1944	Joseph Stewart	Sergeant	158th Infantry Regiment	KIA	Killed in action; further circumstances not stated in the cited record
24 May 1944	Rudolph Thomas	Second Lieutenant	158th Infantry Regiment	KIA	Killed in action; further circumstances not stated in the cited record
23 May 1944	Alfonso Gonzales	Private First Class	41st Division, 158th Infantry Regiment	KIA	Killed in action; further circumstances not stated in the cited record
23 May 1944	Eugene Peters	Private First Class	Company M, 3rd Battalion, 158th Infantry	KIA	Killed in action in New Guinea
23 May 1944	Juan C Apodaca	Staff Sergeant	158th Infantry Regiment	KIA	Killed in action; further circumstances not stated in the cited record
23 May 1944	Lloyd Smith	Sergeant	158th Infantry Regiment	KIA	Killed in action; further circumstances not stated in the cited record
23 January 1944	Woodrow F Sanders	First Lieutenant	158th Infantry Regiment	KIA	Killed in action; further circumstances not stated in the cited record
22 January 1944	Burble Richardson	Private First Class	158th Infantry Regiment	KIA	Killed in action; further circumstances not stated in the cited record
22 January 1944	James W Brown	Sergeant	158th Infantry Regiment	KIA	Killed in action; further circumstances not stated in the cited record
22 January 1944	Merle E Houck	Private First Class	158th Infantry Regiment	KIA	Killed in action; further circumstances not stated in the cited record
22 January 1944	Richard Joel Krakora	Private	Company G, 158th Infantry Regiment	KIA	Killed in action; further circumstances not stated in the cited record
16 January 1944	Clark J Boyer	Private	158th Infantry Regiment	KIA	Killed in action; further circumstances not stated in the cited record
16 January 1944	Marion Robinson Howell	Private First Class	158th Infantry Regiment	KIA	Killed in action; further circumstances not stated in the cited record
12 January 1944	Alfredo B Chavez	Private	158th Infantry Regiment	KIA	Killed in action; further circumstances not stated in the cited record
6 January 1944	Joseph J Sinkus	Private	158th Infantry Regiment	KIA	Killed in action; further circumstances not stated in the cited record
5 November 1943	Carl S Robinson	Private First Class	158th Infantry Regiment	DNB	DNB - Died Non-battle
6 September 1943	Carl E Bannon	Second Lieutenant	158th Infantry Regiment	DNB	DNB - Died Non-battle

=== World War I ===
The 158th served as a replacement and depot organization rather than entering combat as a regiment. Consequently, memorial records describing some men as KIA or DOW require reconciliation with their final organization at the time of death.

Date	Name	Rank	Unit	Classification	Nature of death or loss
12 January 1919	Frederic C Robert	Private	40th Division, 158th Infantry Regiment	Died of Disease	Died of Disease
1 December 1918	Norvald Larson	Private	40th Division, 158th Infantry Regiment	Not stated	Cause or classification not stated in the cited record
17 November 1918	Edward J Losty	Private	40th Division, 158th Infantry Regiment, HQ Company	Died of Injuries, accidental discharge of gun	Died of Injuries, accidental discharge of gun
12 November 1918	Henry C Houston	Officer NCO	40th Division, 158th Infantry Regiment	Not stated	Cause or classification not stated in the cited record
11 November 1918	Clyde H Johnson	Corporal	40th Division, 158th Infantry Regiment	Died of Disease	Died of Disease
25 October 1918	Raymond J Cross	Private	40th Division, 158th Infantry Regiment	Died of Disease	Died of Disease
23 October 1918	Alfred Aamodt	Corporal	158th Infantry Regiment, 40th Division	Died of Disease	Died of Disease
14 October 1918	Mode Wilson	Private	158th Infantry Regiment, 42nd Division	DOW	Died of wounds; further circumstances not stated in the cited record
14 October 1918	Wilbur A Wright	Private	40th Division, 158th Infantry Regiment	Not stated	Cause or classification not stated in the cited record
13 October 1918	Arthur N Blower	Corporal	40th Division, 158th Infantry Regiment	Not stated	Cause or classification not stated in the cited record
13 October 1918	Thomas L Collins	Private First Class	40th Division, 158th Infantry Regiment	Not stated	Cause or classification not stated in the cited record
11 October 1918	Daniel E Jacobson	Private	40th Division, 158th Infantry Regiment	Died of Disease	Died of Disease
9 October 1918	Ralph B Rees	Private	40th Division, 158th Infantry Regiment	Died of Disease	Died of Disease
7 October 1918	Ralph Edward Brockman	Private	40th Division, 158th Infantry Regiment	DOW	Died of wounds; further circumstances not stated in the cited record
6 October 1918	William H Lahti	Private	40th Division, 158th Infantry Regiment	Died of Disease	Died of Disease
28 September 1918	Carl Ansel Miller	Private	Company D, 158th Infantry Regiment	KIA	Killed in action; further circumstances not stated in the cited record
26 September 1918	Frank Hancock	Private	158th Infantry Regiment, 40th Division	KIA	Killed in action; further circumstances not stated in the cited record
26 September 1918	Roy E Landes	Private	40th Division, 158th Infantry Regiment	Not stated	Cause or classification not stated in the cited record
5 September 1918	Floyd E Reavis	Private	40th Division, 158th Infantry Regiment	Not stated	Cause or classification not stated in the cited record
Date not stated	Arnold W Aosved	Private	Company A, 158th Infantry Regiment	KIA	Killed in action; further circumstances not stated in the cited record

=== Arizona campaigns, 1865-1866 ===
The regiment's earliest losses occurred during the operations of the 1st Arizona Volunteer Infantry.

Date	Name	Rank	Unit	Classification	Nature of death or loss
13 August 1866	Paulino Espinosa	Private	Company F, 1st Arizona Volunteer Infantry	KIA	Killed in action at Skull Valley
15 June 1866	McGill	Sergeant	Company B, 1st Arizona Volunteer Infantry	Battle death	Muster-roll summary counted the death as battle-related; engagement not established
20 April 1866	John Broderick	Private	Company A, 1st Arizona Volunteer Infantry	Hostile death	Killed by Apaches while fishing along the Verde River
10 April 1866	Au Papat	Private	Company C, 1st Arizona Volunteer Infantry	DOW	Died of wounds received in the engagement of 31 March 1866
28 February 1866	Roque Ramirez	Private	Company E, 1st Arizona Volunteer Infantry	Hostile death	Killed by Apaches while fishing along the Verde River
24 February 1866	Bernardino Escalante	Private	Company F, 1st Arizona Volunteer Infantry	KIA	Killed in action at Skull Valley
24 February 1866	Jose Anselmo	Private	Company F, 1st Arizona Volunteer Infantry	KIA	Killed in action at Skull Valley
18 January 1866	Hownik Mawkum	Private	Company C, 1st Arizona Volunteer Infantry	KIA	Killed in action near Fort McDowell
18 January 1866	Juan Lewis	Private	Company C, 1st Arizona Volunteer Infantry	KIA	Killed in action near Fort McDowell
10 December 1865	Santiago Gutierres	Private	Company E, 1st Arizona Volunteer Infantry	Disease	Died of illness near Tucson
18 November 1865	Felipe Cordova	Private	Company E, 1st Arizona Volunteer Infantry	Disease	Died of illness at Calabasas (Fort Mason)
Date not stated	Ke Du	Private	Company B, 1st Arizona Volunteer Infantry	Battle death	Killed in battle; date not recorded in the cited muster-roll study
Date not stated	Vicente Bracamontes	Private	Company E, 1st Arizona Volunteer Infantry	Disease	Died of illness at Tucson
Date not stated	Yosk	Corporal	Company B, 1st Arizona Volunteer Infantry	Battle death	Killed in battle; date not recorded in the cited muster-roll study
Date not stated	Zep Gosha	Private	Company B, 1st Arizona Volunteer Infantry	Battle death	Killed in battle; date not recorded in the cited muster-roll study
