= 158th Maneuver Enhancement Brigade =

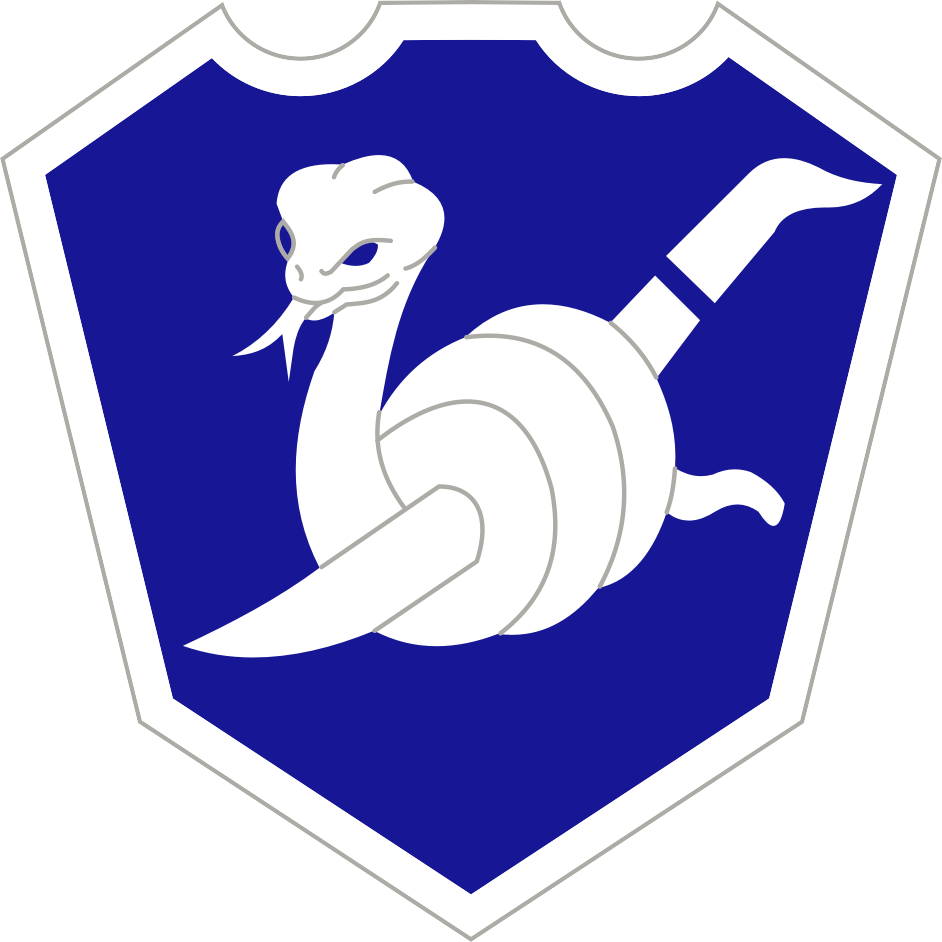
- Active: 2010-present
- Country: United States
- Branch: United States Army National Guard
- Type: Maneuver Enhancement
- Size: Brigade
- Part of: Arizona Army National Guard
- Garrison/HQ: SSG Thomas D. Rabjohn Readiness Center | Papago Park Mil Res, Phoenix, Arizona
- Nickname: Bushmasters
- Mottos: We Can, We Do
- Engagements: World War II; American Theater; New Guinea (with arrowhead); Luzon (with arrowhead)
- Decorations: Philippine Presidential Unit Citation; Meritorious Unit Citation

Commanders
- Current commander: Col. Peter Garver
- Command Sergeant Major: CSM Geoffrey Hunt

Insignia
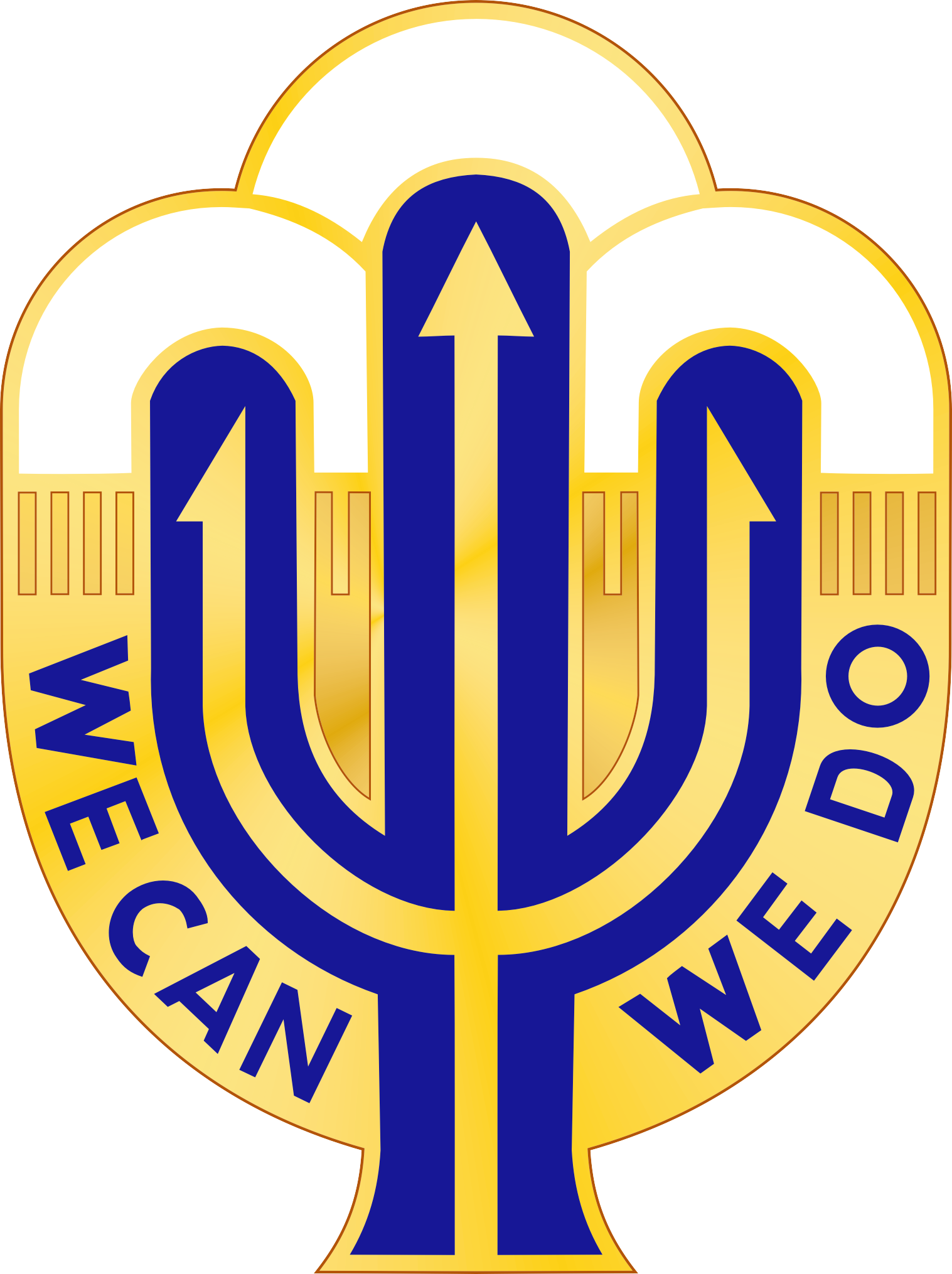
- 158th Maneuver Enhancement Brigade DUI

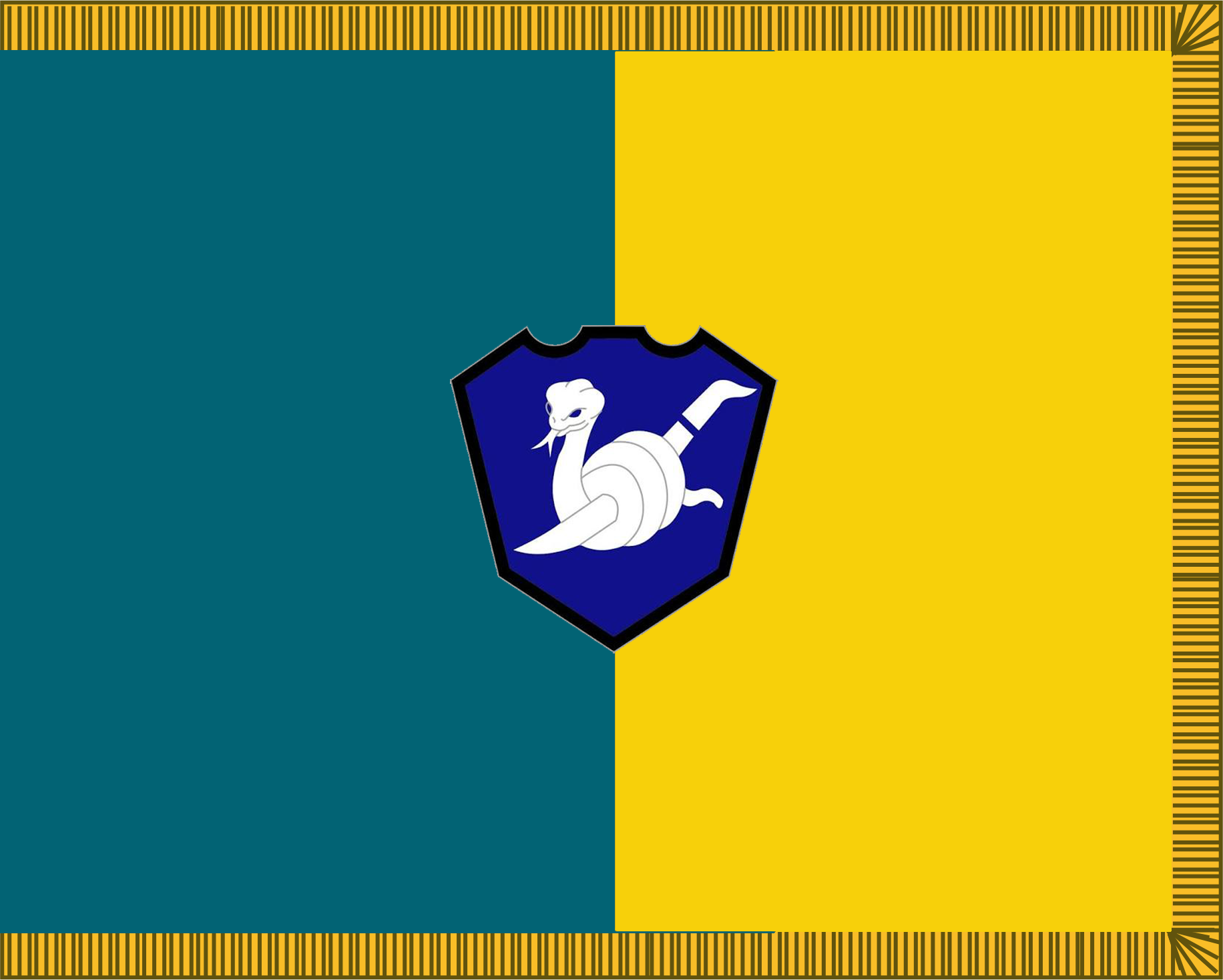
- 158th Maneuver Enhancement Brigade Flag

The 158th Maneuver Enhancement Brigade (158 MEB) "Bushmasters" is a unit of the Arizona Army National Guard since September 1, 2010. The unit traces it lineage back to the 258th Infantry Brigade, the 153rd Artillery Brigade and the 158th Infantry Regiment.

The unit began as Cannon Company, 158th Infantry Regiment of the Arizona National Guard stationed in the Panama Canal Zone as part of the 45th Infantry Division in December 1942. It was during their service in Panama they earned the nickname "Bushmasters." During World War II, the unit was sent to the Pacific Theater as part of the 41st Infantry Division, where they earned three Campaign Streamers: American Theater, New Guinea (with arrowhead), Luzon (with arrowhead) and a Philippine Presidential Unit Citation in 1945.

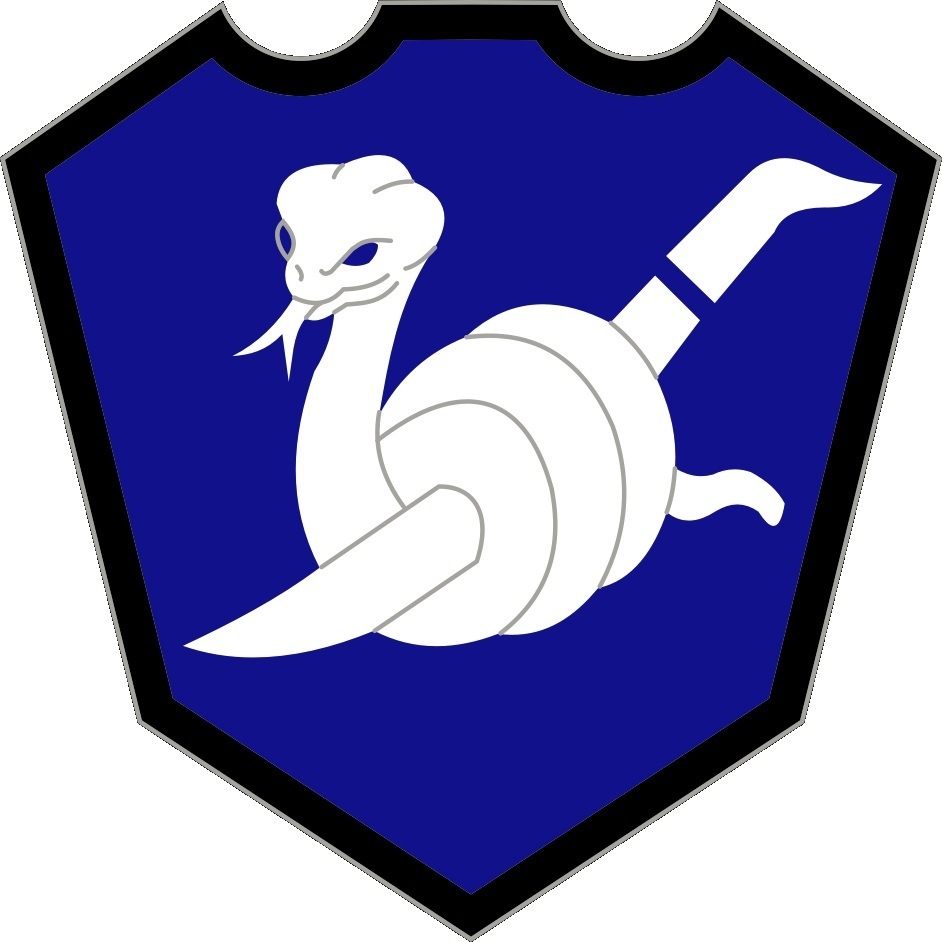
SSI of 258th Infantry Brigade / Military Police Company

After the war, they were reorganized in 1948 as the Heavy Mortar Co., 158th Infantry Regiment. It went through several other reorganizations until it became a HHC, 3rd Battalion, 158th Regiment, 258th Separate Infantry Brigade.

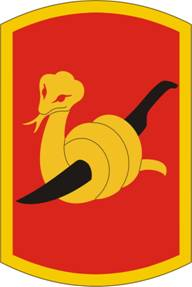
SSI of the 153rd Field Artillery Brigade

In 1967, the unit was converted to a Military Police Battalion until 1976 when it was redesignated as the 153rd Field Artillery Group and in 1978 became the 153rd Field Artillery Brigade. The unit moved to Phoenix in 1991 and participated in Operation Iraqi Freedom earning the Meritorious Unit Citation in 2006. In September 2010, the unit was redesignated as the 158th MEB.

== Subordinate Units ==
158th Maneuver Enhancement Brigade (AZ ARNG) SSG Thomas D. Rabjohn Readiness Center | Papago Park Mil Res, Phoenix, Arizona, United States

- Headquarters and Headquarters Company Papago Park Military Reservation
- 1st Battalion, 158th Infantry Regiment Mesa Armory | Mesa
  - Headquarters and Headquarters Company
  - Company A Valencia Armory | Tucson
  - Company B Arizona, United States
  - Company C Arizona, United States
  - Company D Arizona, United States
  - Company G, 29th Brigade Support Battalion (Attached)
- 253rd Engineer Battalion Florence Military Reservation | Florence
  - Headquarters and Headquarters Company
  - Forward Support Company
  - 258th Engineer Company Phoenix, Arizona, United States
  - 819th Engineer Company Camp Navajo
  - 194th Engineer Detachment Camp Navajo
  - 257th Engineer Detachment
  - 259th Engineer Detachment
  - 260th Engineer Detachment Camp Navajo
  - 362nd Ordnance Company Glendale Readiness Center | Glendale
  - 363rd Ordnance Company Coolidge Armory | Coolidge
  - Company A, 422nd Signal Battalion Casa Grande Armory
- 850th Military Police Battalion Papago Park Military Reservation
  - Headquarters and Headquarters Detachment
  - 855th Military Police Company Phoenix Armory
  - 856th Military Police Company Camp Navajo
  - 860th Military Police Company Valencia Armory | Tucson
- 153rd Brigade Support Battalion Papago Park Military Reservation
  - Headquarters and Headquarters Detachment
  - Company A Phoenix, Arizona, United States
  - Company B Phoenix, Arizona, United States
- 365th Signal Company Papago Park Military Reservation
