= 1st Arizona Volunteer Infantry =

Military unit in the Arizona Territory (1865 to 1866)

- Active: Sept. 2, 1865 – Nov. 7, 1866
- Country: United States
- Allegiance: United States Volunteers
- Branch: Infantry
- Type: Mounted infantry
- Role: Counterinsurgency
- Size: Five companies; ten officers and 333 enlisted
- Engagements: Apache Wars

Commanders
- Notable commanders: Colonel William H. Garvin, Territorial adjutant general

1st Arizona Volunteer Infantry was an infantry regiment in federal service from Arizona Territory that served under special provisions during the Apache Wars in 1865–1866. The regiment was primarily raised among the native and indigenous population of Arizona, Mexicans, Maricopas, and Pima. It was thwarted by the US Army, and disbanded when the federal government refused to continue funding.

== Formation ==
After the end American Civil War, the last troops of the California Column returned to California. Due to the ongoing Apache Wars, the need for a local fighting force still existed. The territorial legislature discussed the feasibility of creating a corps of territorial rangers, but the project died because its cost were approximated to be ten time as large as the annual tax revenue of the Territory. Already in 1864, governor John Noble Goodwin had been authorized to raise a regiment of volunteer infantry for three years or for the duration of the war. No troops had, however, been raised during the war. Approval for raising this regiment after the end of the war was given by the War Department in the Spring of 1865 because of the Indian menace, and about 350 men were recruited and mustered into federal service between Sept. 2 and Nov. 3, 1865.

== Organization ==
Colonel William H. Garvin was appointed adjutant general and the immediate superior of the regimental organization. The regiment would primarily be raised among the native and indigenous population of Arizona, Mexicans, Maricopas, and Pima, and be organized into six companies. Company D was, however, never organized.

Company	Officers	Recruitment area	Ethnicity of the enlisted men
A	First Lieutenant Primitivo Cervantes	Yavapai County, Mohave County, northern Yuma County	28 Mexicans, many from Sonora; 7 Europeans and Americans
B	Captain Juan Chevereah; First Lieutenant Thomas Ewing (commanding officer); Second Lieutenant Charles Riedt	Gila Valley and central Arizona	103 Maricopas
C	Captain J. Ross Browne (detached service); Captain John N. Coster (detached service); First Lieutenant John D. Walker (commanding officer); Second Lieutenant William A. Hancock,	Gila Valley and central Arizona	94 Pima
D	-	Tucson area	never recruited
E	Captain Hiram S. Washburn; First Lieutenant John M. Ver Mehr (detached service); Second Lieutenant Manuel Gallegos	southern Pima County	97 Mexicans, of which all but one was born in Sonora; at least 28 also lived there when recruited
F	Second Lieutenant Oscar F. Hutton	Mining region east of Tubac	32 Mexicans, of which all but one was born in Sonora

== Operations ==
The regiment never fought as a unit, but operated as one- or two-company detachments. The basic tactics were search and destroy operations under severe conditions; the United States Army denied the Arizona Volunteers proper quarters, even tents, and the footgear and uniforms were often deficient due to hard service. The indigenous soldiers were very efficient in fighting their traditional enemies, the Apaches. In spite of the demanding service only 20 men deserted. Ten had been killed in action, five died of diseases, and 13 were seriously wounded but survived.

== Disbandment ==
The regiment had been enlisted according to the war provisions of the Federal Government, but when Governor Richard Cunningham McCormick in 1866 wrote to the Secretary of war, Edwin Stanton, asking for a prolongation of the enlistment period of the Arizona Volunteers, Stanton denied the request as there were no law authorizing it. Attempts to include appropriation for its equipment, subsistence and payment failed. The regiment was officially disbanded on July 1, 1866. The actual discharge of the men took, however, much longer time; the last soldiers were discharged Nov. 7, 1866.
