= Densley =

Densley is a surname. Notable people with the surname include:

- Gentry Densley, American singer, guitarist and composer
- James Densley (born 1982), British-American sociologist
- Les Densley (1894–1974), farmer and politician in South Australia
- Peter Densley (born 1964), former Australian rules footballer

== See also ==
- 25670 Densley, minor planet discovered January 4, 2000
- Deley
- Ensley (disambiguation)
