= Ensley =

Ensley may refer to:

== People ==
=== Given name ===
- Ensley Bingham (born 1961), British boxer
- Ensley A. Carpenter (c. 1819–before 1910), American physician
- Ensley Llewellyn (born 1905), American Military Officer

=== Surname ===
- Elizabeth Piper Ensley (1848–1919), American suffragist
- Harold Ensley (1912–2005), American radio and television personality
- Newell Houston Ensley (1852–1888), American Baptist minister and civil rights activist

== Places ==
- Ensley (Birmingham), Alabama, United States
- Ensley, Florida, United States
- Ensley Township, Michigan, United States

== Other uses ==
- Ensley, a 2018 album by Pink Siifu
