= Randal B. Vandavall =

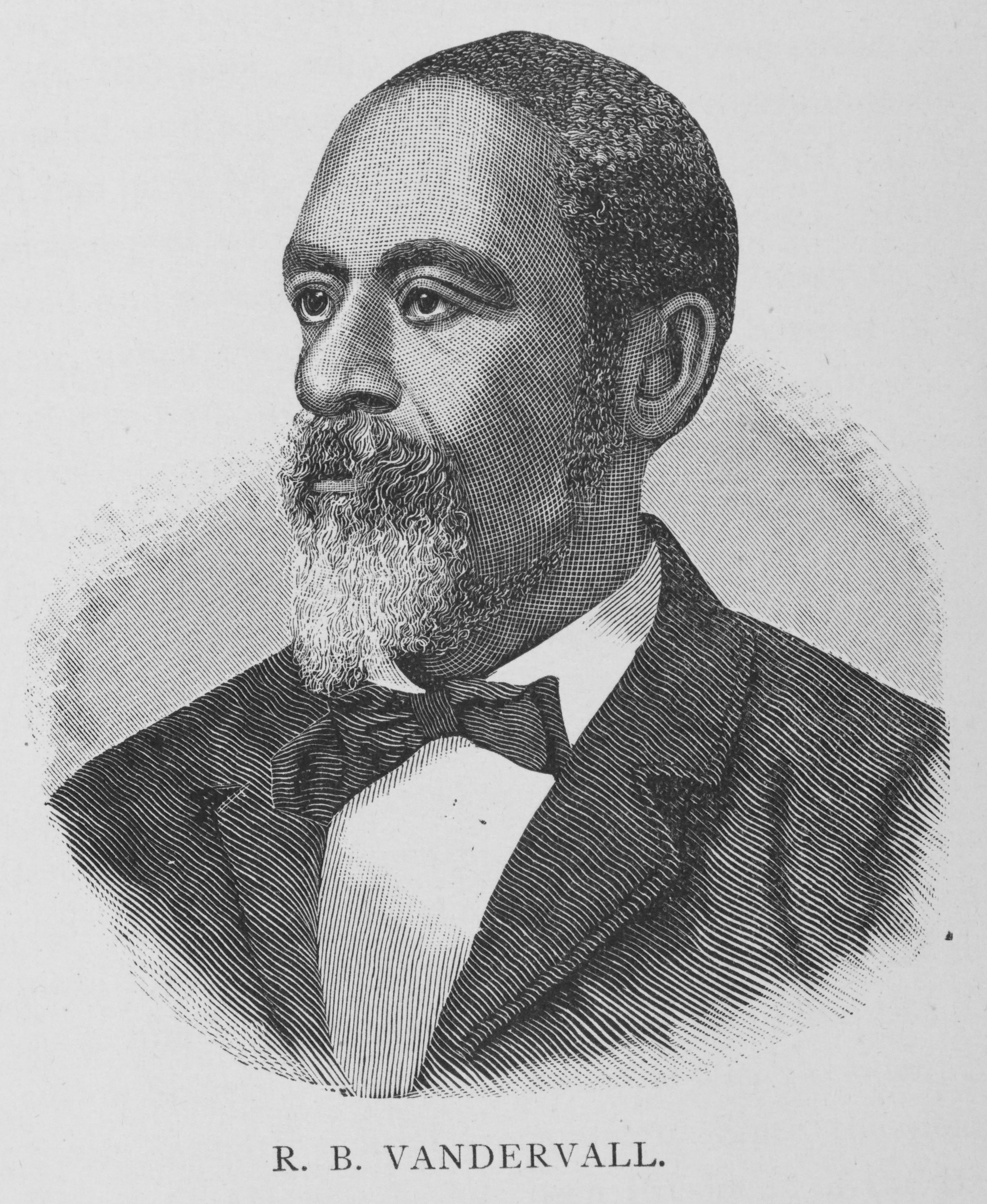
- Vandavall in 1887
- Born: March 23, 1832; Neely's Bend, Tennessee
- Died: 1898; Nashville, Tennessee, United States
- Occupations: Educator, minister

Religious life
- Religion: Baptist

Randal B. Vandervall (March 23, 1832 - 1898) was an early African-American Baptist preacher in Nashville, Tennessee. He began preaching while still a slave. After emancipation, he helped found Roger Williams University.

== Early life and career ==
Randal Bartholomew Vandervall was born a slave on March 23, 1832. (Note: His last name has been given in several spellings, including Venable, Vandervill, Vandervall, and Vandevall, and his first name is also spelled Randall) He was born near Neely's Bend in Tennessee about ten miles above Nashville on the Cumberland River. His parents were named Sylvonia and Lewis. Sylvonia was owned by a man named Major Hall, and Lewis by a man named Foster. Lewis was a coachman and was only allowed to visit his wife and eleven children once per year. When Hall died, his daughter Anna took possession of Sylvonia and her children, whom she hired out. On New Years Day at the age of seven, Randal was hired out, leaving his mother and siblings. In his new surroundings he was permitted to attend school and learned to spell. After three years, he was taken to Nashville where he was hired to another man named Garite. Later, Charles Hall, a relative of Anna and Major Hall, secured Randal and sought to take him to Kansas. Randal hid, and did not go west. Instead he was purchased by a man named Vandervall with whom he was living. Vandervall had a son, John, who continued Randal's lessons - which Randal paid for by rail splitting. At the age of 15, Randal converted to the Baptist religion and at the age of 16 began preaching. He also continued to work on constructing railroads.

He married a woman named Martha Nicholson of Hillbrook and was allowed to live with her. When the man who hired him learned he could read and write, he was abused and ran away, returning to his master and persuading him to change his work. Randal was hired out to work in Nashville, paying his master $200 per year for the privilege. This situation was not satisfactory to the master, and he decided to sell Randal south. Randal desired to purchase himself, and a price of $1800 was agreed, and Randal eventually succeeded in raising the money. Martha was the daughter of her master, and when Martha's master died and she was sold to her deceased master's grandson, Nelson Nicholson. Randal hired Martha from Nelson until, just before the American Civil War (1861-1865), Nelson decided to purchase Randal to allow the two to remain together with him, as Nelson was planning to leave Nashville. When the war broke out, Nelson did not leave town after all, and he hired Martha and Randal out. Before the end of the war, Martha and Randal and their child, James N., were purchased by a Mr. McKenzie.

== Later career ==
In January 1862, Vandavall was elected pastor of the African Mission of the white Spring Street Baptist Church, although when the Union Army arrived in February, the Spring Street church dissolved, and the African Mission with it. The church reformed with a white Northern minister, Daniel W. Phillips, who recruited Vandavall to aid him in creating a college to train black preachers. In 1866 this school became the Nashville Normal and Theological Institution with Phillips as president and Vandavall as a trustee. It was later known as Roger Williams University. After freedom came at the end of the war (1865), Vandavall was legally married to his wife by his friend Rev. Phillips.

In 1866, Vandavall formed the Second Colored Baptist Church, later called the First Baptist Church of East Nashville. Services were initially held in Vandavall's home before moving to old Union Army barracks, and then to a building called McClure's Hall. Vandervall was a very successful preacher, organizing a total of nine churches. He was a life member of the American Baptist Publication Society and president of the Tennessee Sunday School Convention for many years. He also served terms as president of the Baptist State convention. He was closely connected to Roger Williams University throughout his life and received from it a Doctorate in Divinity in 1886.

Vandavall was also a noted teacher. In 1880, the city opened a school in a four-room house on Wetmore and Spring Streets and named it for Vandavall. He was a delegate to the first annual meeting of the Tennessee Conference of Educational Workers in 1895. He served on the negro committee of the Tennessee Centennial Exposition in 1897.

== Death ==
Vandavall died in 1898.
