= Washington Army National Guard =

Headquarters, State Area Command Washington Army National Guard
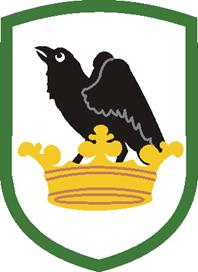
- Shoulder sleeve insignia
- Active: 1854–Present
- Country: United States
- Allegiance: Washington
- Branch: United States Army
- Type: ARNG Headquarters Command
- Role: United States Army National Guard
- Part of: Washington National Guard
- Garrison/HQ: Camp Murray, Washington
- Engagements: World War I World War II; Korean War; Persian Gulf War; Kosovo War; War in Afghanistan; Iraq War; War Against the Islamic State

Commanders
- Current commander: BG Paul T. Sellars
- Command Chief Warrant Officer: CW5 Marc Brackett
- Command Sergeant Major: CSM Eric D. Honeycutt

Insignia
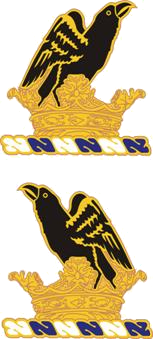
- Distinctive unit insignia

- Washington Army National Guard Crest

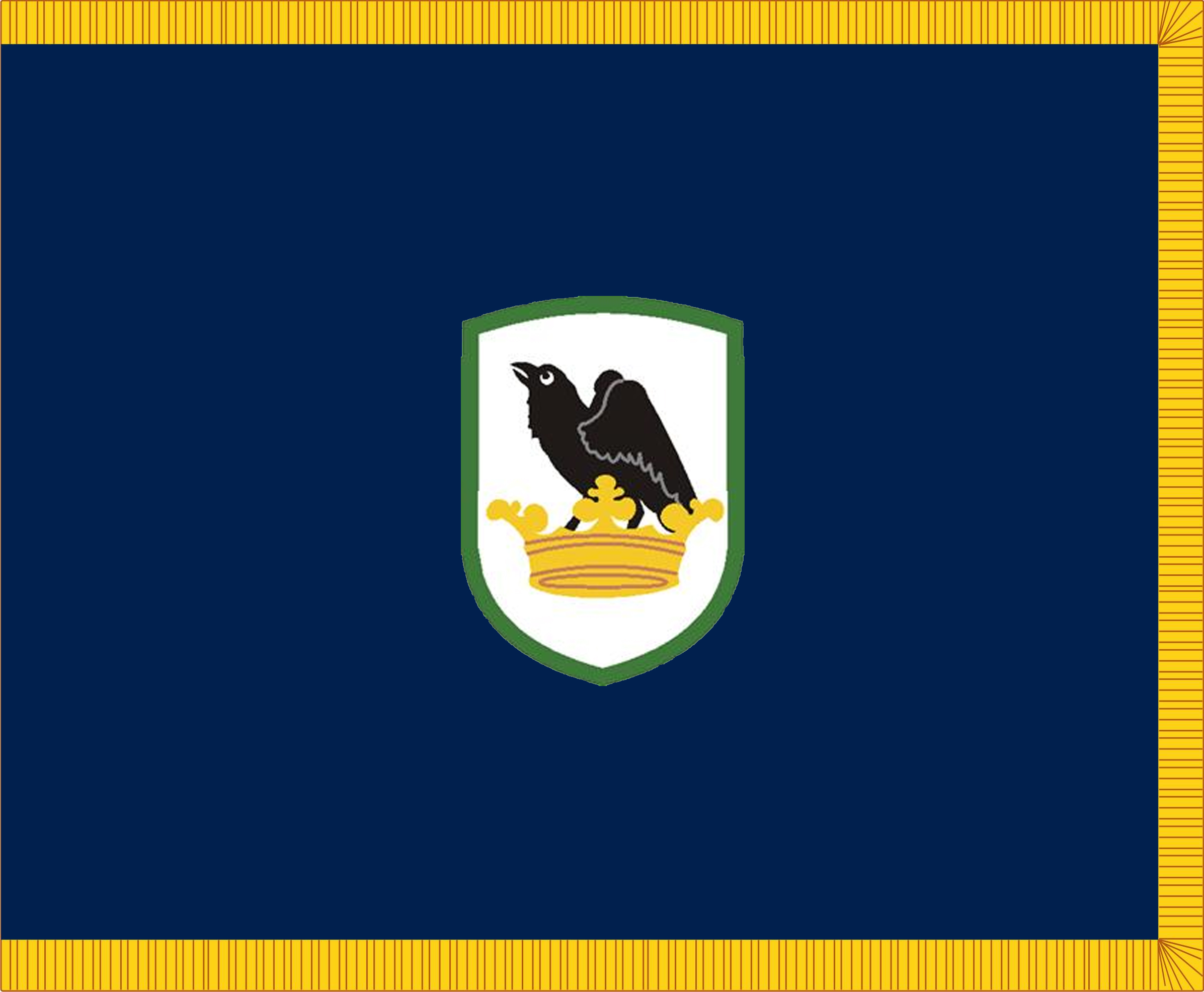
- Washington Army National Guard Headquarters Flag

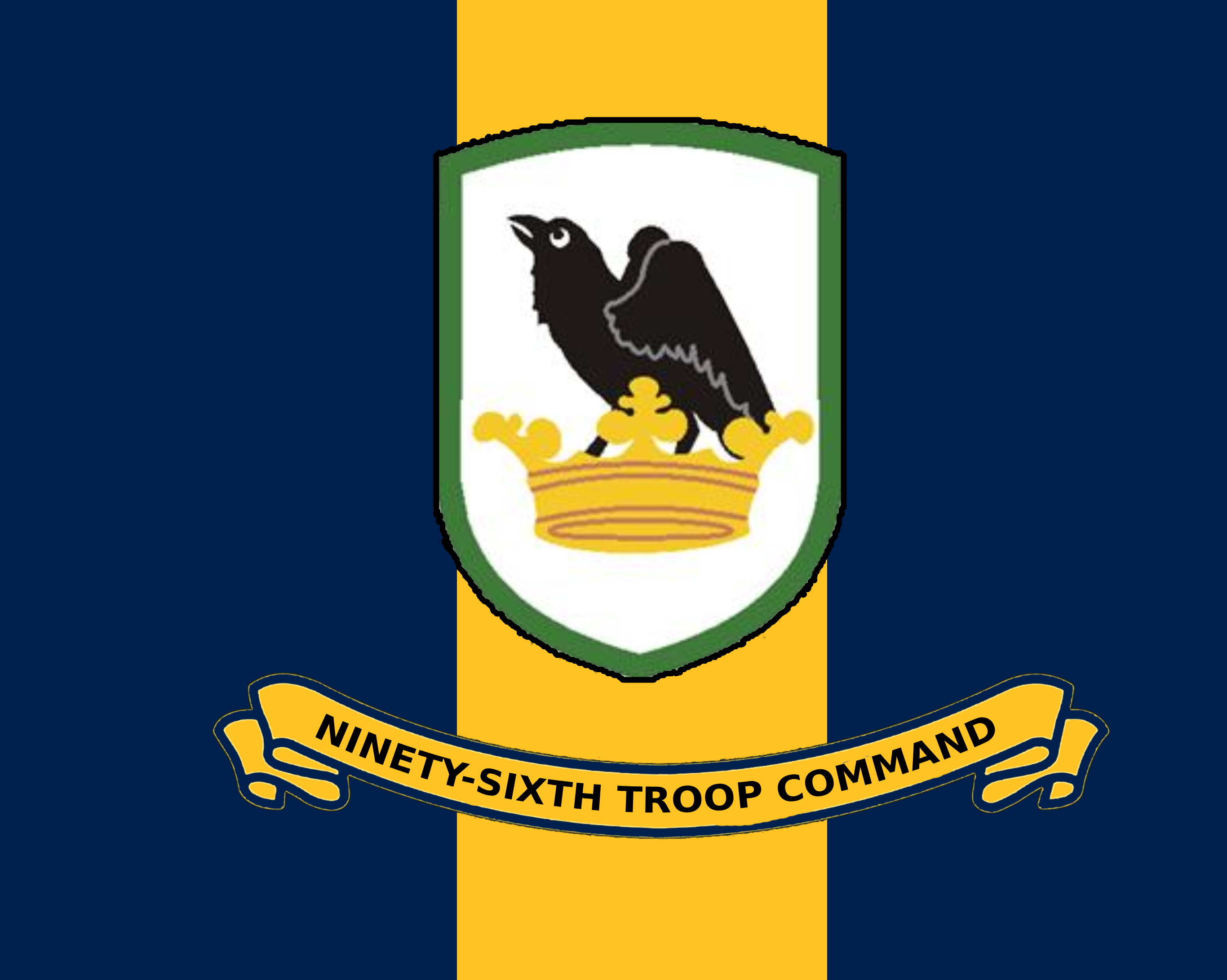
- Washington Army National Guard 98th Troop Command Flag

The Washington Army National Guard is a component of the United States Army and the Washington National Guard based in Washington. The history of the Washington Army National Guard dates back to 1854 with formation of the Washington Territorial Militia. The command is headquartered at Camp Murray in Pierce County. It consists of 6,200 soldiers in two brigades and various smaller units located throughout the state.

== Organization ==
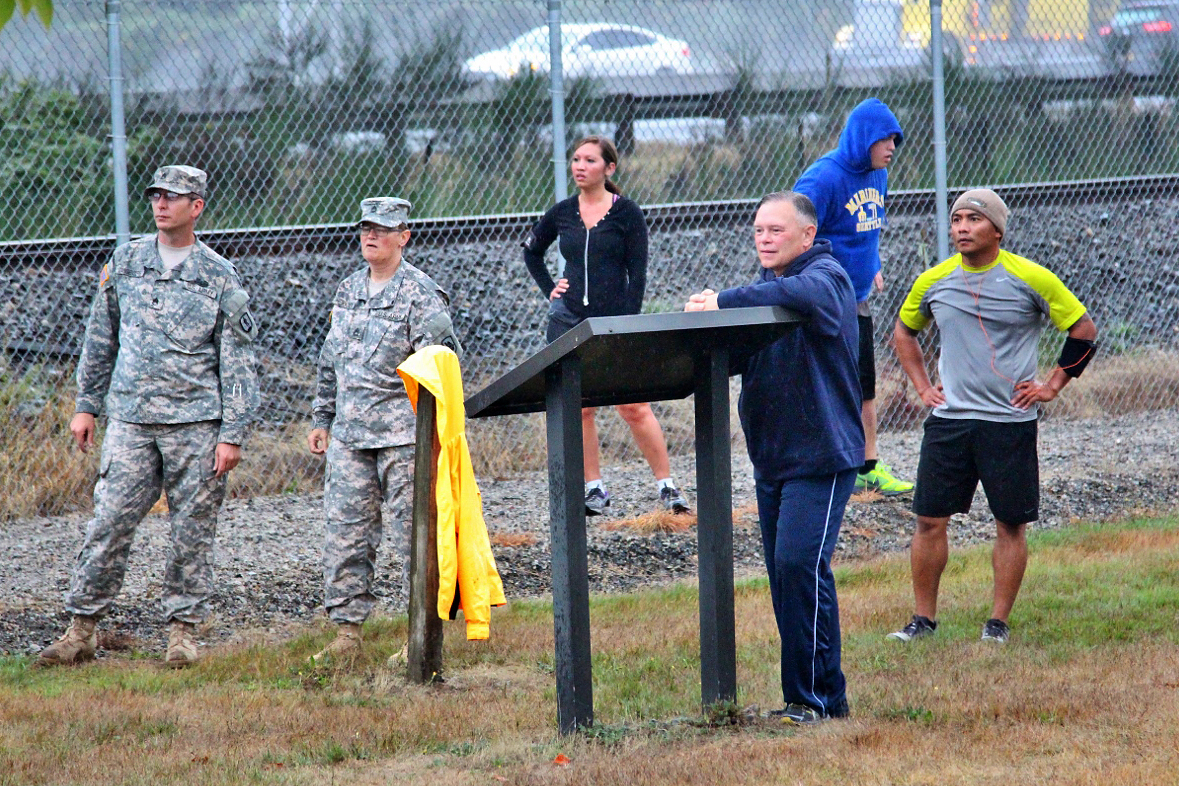
Washington Army National Guardsmen look on as runners race in a suicide awareness run

As of January 2026 the Washington Army National Guard consists of the following units:

- Joint Force Headquarters-Washington, Army Element, at Camp Murray
  - Headquarters and Headquarters Detachment, Joint Force Headquarters-Washington, Army Element, at Camp Murray
  - Washington Recruiting & Retention Battalion, at Camp Murray
    - Company A, Washington Recruiting & Retention Battalion, in Spokane
      - Detachment 1, Company A, Washington Recruiting & Retention Battalion, in Spokane
      - Detachment 2, Company A, Washington Recruiting & Retention Battalion, in Kent
    - Company B, Washington Recruiting & Retention Battalion, in Lakewood
      - Detachment 3, Company B, Washington Recruiting & Retention Battalion, in Marysville
      - Detachment 4, Company B, Washington Recruiting & Retention Battalion, in Longview
      - Detachment 5, Company B, Washington Recruiting & Retention Battalion, in Yakima
      - Detachment 6, Company B, Washington Recruiting & Retention Battalion, at Camp Murray
      - Detachment 7, Company B, Washington Recruiting & Retention Battalion, in Olympia
  - Washington Medical Detachment, at Camp Murray
    - Detachment 1, Washington Medical Detachment, at Geiger Field
  - Washington Detachment, Army National Guard Training Site, at Camp Murray
  - 10th Civil Support Team (WMD), at Camp Murray
  - 1244th Judge Advocate General Trial Defense Team, at Camp Murray
  - Army Aviation Support Facility #1, at Gray Army Airfield
  - Army Aviation Support Facility #2, at Pangborn Memorial Airport
  - Maintenance and Training Shop, at Yakima Training Center
  - Field Maintenance Shop 1, in Seattle
  - Field Maintenance Shop 2, in Ephrata
  - Field Maintenance Shop 3, in Sedro-Woolley
  - Field Maintenance Shop 4, in Montesano
  - Field Maintenance Shop 5, at Fairchild Air Force Base
  - 56th Theater Information Operations Group, at Joint Base Lewis–McChord
    - Headquarters and Headquarters Company, 56th Theater Information Operations Group, at Joint Base Lewis–McChord
    - Company A, 1st Battalion, 19th Special Forces Group (Airborne), in Buckley
    - Detachment 1, Company D (Support), 1st Battalion, 19th Special Forces Group (Airborne), in Buckley
    - Special Operations Detachment-Pacific (Airborne), at Joint Base Lewis–McChord
      - 1161st Quartermaster Detachment (Aerial Delivery), at Joint Base Lewis–McChord
    - 110th Information Operations Battalion, in Annapolis (MD) — (Maryland Army National Guard)
    - 122nd Theater Public Affairs Support Element, at Joint Base Lewis–McChord
      - 141st Military History Detachment, at Joint Base Lewis–McChord
    - 156th Information Operations Battalion, at Joint Base Lewis–McChord
      - Headquarters and Headquarters Detachment, 156th Information Operations Battalion, at Joint Base Lewis–McChord
      - Company A, 156th Information Operations Battalion, at Joint Base Lewis–McChord
      - Company B, 156th Information Operations Battalion, at Joint Base Lewis–McChord
    - 341st Military Intelligence Battalion (Linguist), at Joint Base Lewis–McChord (part of 300th Military Intelligence Brigade (Linguist))
      - Headquarters and Headquarters Company, 341st Military Intelligence Battalion (Linguist), at Joint Base Lewis–McChord
      - Company A, 341st Military Intelligence Battalion (Linguist), at Fairchild Air Force Base
        - Detachment 1, Company A, 341st Military Intelligence Battalion (Linguist), at Joint Base Lewis–McChord
        - Detachment 2, Company A, 341st Military Intelligence Battalion (Linguist), in Vancouver
      - Company B, 341st Military Intelligence Battalion (Linguist), at Joint Base Lewis–McChord
      - Company C, 341st Military Intelligence Battalion (Linguist), in Chicago (IL) — (Illinois Army National Guard)
      - Company D, 341st Military Intelligence Battalion (Linguist), at Joint Base Lewis–McChord
  - 81st Stryker Brigade Combat Team, at Camp Murray
    - Headquarters and Headquarters Company, 81st Stryker Brigade Combat Team, at Camp Murray
    - 1st Squadron, 82nd Cavalry Regiment, in Bend (OR) — (Oregon Army National Guard)
    - 1st Battalion, 161st Infantry Regiment, in Spokane
      - Headquarters and Headquarters Company, 1st Battalion, 161st Infantry Regiment, in Spokane
        - Detachment 1, Headquarters and Headquarters Company, 1st Battalion, 161st Infantry Regiment, in Richland
      - Company A, 1st Battalion, 161st Infantry Regiment, at Yakima Training Center
        - Detachment 1, Company A, 1st Battalion, 161st Infantry Regiment, in Wenatchee
      - Company B, 1st Battalion, 161st Infantry Regiment, in Richland
        - Detachment 1, Company B, 1st Battalion, 161st Infantry Regiment, in Walla Walla
      - Company C, 1st Battalion, 161st Infantry Regiment, in Spokane
        - Detachment 1, Company C, 1st Battalion, 161st Infantry Regiment, at Geiger Field
    - 3rd Battalion, 161st Infantry Regiment, in Kent
      - Headquarters and Headquarters Company, 3rd Battalion, 161st Infantry Regiment, in Kent
      - Company A, 3rd Battalion, 161st Infantry Regiment, in Anacortes
        - Detachment 1, Company A, 3rd Battalion, 161st Infantry Regiment, in Redmond
      - Company B, 3rd Battalion, 161st Infantry Regiment, in Kent
      - Company C, 3rd Battalion, 161st Infantry Regiment, in Bremerton
        - Detachment 1, Company C, 3rd Battalion, 161st Infantry Regiment, in Port Orchard
    - 1st Battalion, 185th Infantry Regiment, in San Bernardino (CA) — (California Army National Guard)
    - 2nd Battalion, 146th Field Artillery Regiment, in Olympia
      - Headquarters and Headquarters Battery, 2nd Battalion, 146th Field Artillery Regiment, in Olympia
        - Detachment 1, Headquarters and Headquarters Battery, 2nd Battalion, 146th Field Artillery Regiment, in Moses Lake
        - Detachment 2, Headquarters and Headquarters Battery, 2nd Battalion, 146th Field Artillery Regiment, in San Bernardino (CA) — (California Army National Guard)
      - Battery A, 2nd Battalion, 146th Field Artillery Regiment, in Olympia
        - Detachment 1, Battery A, 2nd Battalion, 146th Field Artillery Regiment, in Moses Lake
      - Battery B, 2nd Battalion, 146th Field Artillery Regiment, in Olympia
      - Battery C, 2nd Battalion, 146th Field Artillery Regiment, in Olympia
    - 898th Brigade Engineer Battalion, in Marysville
      - Headquarters and Headquarters Company, 898th Brigade Engineer Battalion, in Marysville
      - Company A (Combat Engineer), 898th Brigade Engineer Battalion, at Yakima Training Center
      - Company B (Engineer Support), 898th Brigade Engineer Battalion, in Vancouver
      - Company C (Signal), 898th Brigade Engineer Battalion, in Marysville
      - Company D (Military Intelligence), 898th Brigade Engineer Battalion, at Camp Murray
        - Detachment 1, Company D (Military Intelligence), 898th Brigade Engineer Battalion, at Yakima Training Center (RQ-28A UAV)
    - 181st Brigade Support Battalion, in Seattle
      - Headquarters and Headquarters Company, 181st Brigade Support Battalion, in Seattle
      - Company A (Distribution), 181st Brigade Support Battalion, in Seattle
      - Company B (Maintenance), 181st Brigade Support Battalion, in Seattle
      - Company C (Medical), 181st Brigade Support Battalion, in Seattle
      - Company D (Forward Support), 181st Brigade Support Battalion, in Prineville (OR) — attached to 1st Squadron, 82nd Cavalry Regiment (Oregon Army National Guard)
      - Company E (Forward Support), 181st Brigade Support Battalion, in Marysville — attached to 898th Brigade Engineer Battalion
        - Detachment 1, Company E (Forward Support), 181st Brigade Support Battalion, at Yakima Training Center
        - Detachment 2, Company E (Forward Support), 181st Brigade Support Battalion, in Vancouver
      - Company F (Forward Support), 181st Brigade Support Battalion, in Olympia — attached to 2nd Battalion, 146th Field Artillery Regiment
      - Company G (Forward Support), 181st Brigade Support Battalion, in Ephrata — attached to 1st Battalion, 161st Infantry Regiment
        - Detachment 1, Company G (Forward Support), 181st Brigade Support Battalion, at Yakima Training Center
      - Company H (Forward Support), 181st Brigade Support Battalion, in Barstow (CA) — attached to 1st Battalion, 185th Infantry Regiment (California Army National Guard)
      - Company I (Forward Support), 181st Brigade Support Battalion, in Kent — attached to 3rd Battalion, 161st Infantry Regiment
  - 96th Troop Command, at Joint Base Lewis–McChord
    - Headquarters and Headquarters Detachment, 96th Troop Command, at Joint Base Lewis–McChord
    - 133rd Army Band, at Camp Murray
    - 144th Digital Liaison Detachment, at Geiger Field
    - 1st Squadron, 303rd Cavalry Regiment, in Centralia (part of 41st Infantry Brigade Combat Team)
      - Headquarters and Headquarters Troop, 1st Squadron, 303rd Cavalry Regiment, in Centralia
      - Troop A, 1st Squadron, 303rd Cavalry Regiment, in Montesano
      - Troop B, 1st Squadron, 303rd Cavalry Regiment, in Longview
      - Troop C (Dismounted), 1st Squadron, 303rd Cavalry Regiment, in Centralia
      - Company D (Forward Support), 141st Brigade Support Battalion, in Montesano
    - 420th Chemical Battalion, in Yakima
      - Headquarters and Headquarters Company, 420th Chemical Battalion, in Yakima
      - 39th Military Police Detachment (Law Enforcement), in Redmond
      - 176th Engineer Company (Vertical Construction Company), in Snohomish
        - Detachment 1, 176th Engineer Company (Vertical Construction Company), in Yakima
      - 286th Engineer Detachment (Fire Fighting Team — Fire Truck), at Fairchild Air Force Base
      - 506th Military Police Detachment (Law Enforcement), at Joint Base Lewis–McChord
      - 540th Chemical Detachment, in Yakima
      - 792nd Chemical Company, in Grandview
        - Detachment 2, 792nd Chemical Company, in Redmond
      - 941st Quartermaster Platoon (Field Feeding), in Yakima
      - 1041st Transportation Company (Light-Medium Truck), at Fairchild Air Force Base
        - 1041st Transportation Company (Light-Medium Truck), at Camp Murray
    - 741st Ordnance Battalion (EOD), in Bremerton
      - Headquarters and Headquarters Detachment, 741st Ordnance Battalion (EOD), in Bremerton
      - 217th Ordnance Company (EOD), at Camp Roberts (CA) — (California Army National Guard)
      - 319th Ordnance Company (EOD), in Pasco
      - 363rd Ordnance Company (EOD), in Coolidge (AZ) — (Arizona Army National Guard)
      - 3665th Ordnance Company (EOD), in North Las Vegas (NV) — (Nevada Army National Guard)
  - 96th Aviation Troop Command, at Gray Army Airfield
    - Headquarters and Headquarters Company, 96th Aviation Troop Command, at Gray Army Airfield
    - Company C, 1st Battalion (Security & Support), 112th Aviation Regiment, at Pangborn Memorial Airport (UH-72A Lakota)
    - Detachment 7, Company A, 2nd Battalion (Fixed Wing), 245th Aviation Regiment (Detachment 51, Operational Support Airlift Activity), at Gray Army Airfield (C-12 Huron)
    - 1st Battalion (General Support Aviation), 168th Aviation Regiment, at Gray Army Airfield (part of 40th Combat Aviation Brigade)
      - Headquarters and Headquarters Company, 1st Battalion (General Support Aviation), 168th Aviation Regiment, at Gray Army Airfield
        - Detachment 1, Headquarters and Headquarters Company, 1st Battalion (General Support Aviation), 168th Aviation Regiment, at Gowen Field (ID) — (Idaho Army National Guard)
        - Detachment 2, Headquarters and Headquarters Company, 1st Battalion (General Support Aviation), 168th Aviation Regiment, at Pendleton Army Airfield (OR) — (Oregon Army National Guard)
        - Detachment 3, Headquarters and Headquarters Company, 1st Battalion (General Support Aviation), 168th Aviation Regiment, at Bryant Army Heliport (AK) — (Alaska Army National Guard)
        - Detachment 4, Headquarters and Headquarters Company, 1st Battalion (General Support Aviation), 168th Aviation Regiment, at Buckley Space Force Base (CO) — (Colorado Army National Guard)
      - Company A (CAC), 1st Battalion (General Support Aviation), 168th Aviation Regiment, at Bryant Army Heliport (AK) (UH-60L Black Hawk) — (Alaska Army National Guard)
      - Company B (Heavy Lift), 1st Battalion (General Support Aviation), 168th Aviation Regiment, at Gray Army Airfield (CH-47F Chinook)
        - Detachment 1, Company B (Heavy Lift), 1st Battalion (General Support Aviation), 168th Aviation Regiment, at Pendleton Army Airfield (OR) — (Oregon Army National Guard)
      - Company C (MEDEVAC), 1st Battalion (General Support Aviation), 168th Aviation Regiment, at West Bend Airport (WI) (HH-60L Black Hawk) — (Wisconsin Army National Guard)
        - Detachment 1, Company C (MEDEVAC), 1st Battalion (General Support Aviation), 168th Aviation Regiment, at Buckley Space Force Base (CO) — (Colorado Army National Guard)
        - Detachment 2, Company C (MEDEVAC), 1st Battalion (General Support Aviation), 168th Aviation Regiment, at Gray Army Airfield (WA)
      - Company D (AVUM), 1st Battalion (General Support Aviation), 168th Aviation Regiment, at Gray Army Airfield (WA)
        - Detachment 1, Company D (AVUM), 1st Battalion (General Support Aviation), 168th Aviation Regiment, at Gowen Field (ID) — (Idaho Army National Guard)
        - Detachment 2, Company D (AVUM), 1st Battalion (General Support Aviation), 168th Aviation Regiment, at Pendleton Army Airfield (OR) — (Oregon Army National Guard)
        - Detachment 3, Company D (AVUM), 1st Battalion (General Support Aviation), 168th Aviation Regiment, at Bryant Army Heliport (AK) — (Alaska Army National Guard)
        - Detachment 4, Company D (AVUM), 1st Battalion (General Support Aviation), 168th Aviation Regiment, at Buckley Space Force Base (CO) — (Colorado Army National Guard)
        - Detachment 5, Company D (AVUM), 1st Battalion (General Support Aviation), 168th Aviation Regiment, at Santa Fe Airport (NM) — (New Mexico Army National Guard)
      - Company E (Forward Support), 1st Battalion (General Support Aviation), 168th Aviation Regiment, at Gray Army Airfield (WA)
        - Detachment 1, Company E (Forward Support), 1st Battalion (General Support Aviation), 168th Aviation Regiment, at Gowen Field (ID) — (Idaho Army National Guard)
        - Detachment 2, Company E (Forward Support), 1st Battalion (General Support Aviation), 168th Aviation Regiment, at Pendleton Army Airfield (OR) — (Oregon Army National Guard)
        - Detachment 3, Company E (Forward Support), 1st Battalion (General Support Aviation), 168th Aviation Regiment, at Bryant Army Heliport (AK) — (Alaska Army National Guard)
        - Detachment 4, Company E (Forward Support), 1st Battalion (General Support Aviation), 168th Aviation Regiment, at Buckley Space Force Base (CO) — (Colorado Army National Guard)
        - Detachment 5, Company E (Forward Support), 1st Battalion (General Support Aviation), 168th Aviation Regiment, at Santa Fe Airport (NM) — (New Mexico Army National Guard)
        - Detachment 6, Company E (Forward Support), 1st Battalion (General Support Aviation), 168th Aviation Regiment, at Papago Army Heliport (AZ) — (Arizona Army National Guard)
      - Company F (ATS), 1st Battalion (General Support Aviation), 168th Aviation Regiment, at Papago Army Heliport (AZ) — (Arizona Army National Guard)
      - Company G (MEDEVAC), 1st Battalion (General Support Aviation), 168th Aviation Regiment, at Santa Fe Airport (NM) (HH-60L Black Hawk) — (New Mexico Army National Guard)
        - Detachment 1, Company G (MEDEVAC), 1st Battalion (General Support Aviation), 168th Aviation Regiment, at Gowen Field (ID) — (Idaho Army National Guard)
      - Company A (CAC), 2nd Battalion (General Support Aviation), 135th Aviation Regiment, at Gray Army Airfield (WA) (UH-60L Black Hawk) — (Army Reserve Aviation Command)
        - Detachment 2, Company D (AVUM), 2nd Battalion (General Support Aviation), 135th Aviation Regiment, at Gray Army Airfield (WA) — (Army Reserve Aviation Command)
        - Detachment 2, Company E (Forward Support), 2nd Battalion (General Support Aviation), 135th Aviation Regiment, at Gray Army Airfield (WA) — (Army Reserve Aviation Command)
      - Company F (ATS), 2nd Battalion (General Support Aviation), 135th Aviation Regiment, at Gray Army Airfield (WA) — (Army Reserve Aviation Command)
      - Company C, 1st Battalion (Assault), 140th Aviation Regiment, at Gray Army Airfield (UH-60M Black Hawk)
        - Detachment 1, Headquarters and Headquarters Company, 1st Battalion (Assault), 140th Aviation Regiment, at Gray Army Airfield
        - Detachment 1, Company D (AVUM), 1st Battalion (Assault), 140th Aviation Regiment, at Gray Army Airfield
        - Detachment 1, Company E (Forward Support), 1st Battalion (Assault), 140th Aviation Regiment, at Gray Army Airfield
      - Detachment 1, Company B (AVIM), 351st Aviation Support Battalion, at Gray Army Airfield
  - 205th Regiment, Regional Training Institute, at Camp Murray
    - Headquarters and Headquarters Company, at Camp Murray
    - 1st Battalion, at Yakima Training Center
    - 2nd Battalion, at Camp Murray

Aviation unit abbreviations: CAC — Command Aviation Company; MEDEVAC — Medical evacuation; AVUM — Aviation Unit Maintenance; AVIM — Aviation Intermediate Maintenance; ATS — Air Traffic Service

== History ==
The history of the National Guard of Washington begins in 1855 before it was granted statehood, when the Washington Territorial Legislature created an organized militia. Washington was granted statehood in 1890, after which the organized militia transformed into a state militia. This militia was known as the Washington State Militia, and fought its first major conflict during the Spanish American War. In 1903, the Washington National Guard (Alongside all other state militias) were given to joint federal-state control after the passage of the Militia Act of 1903.

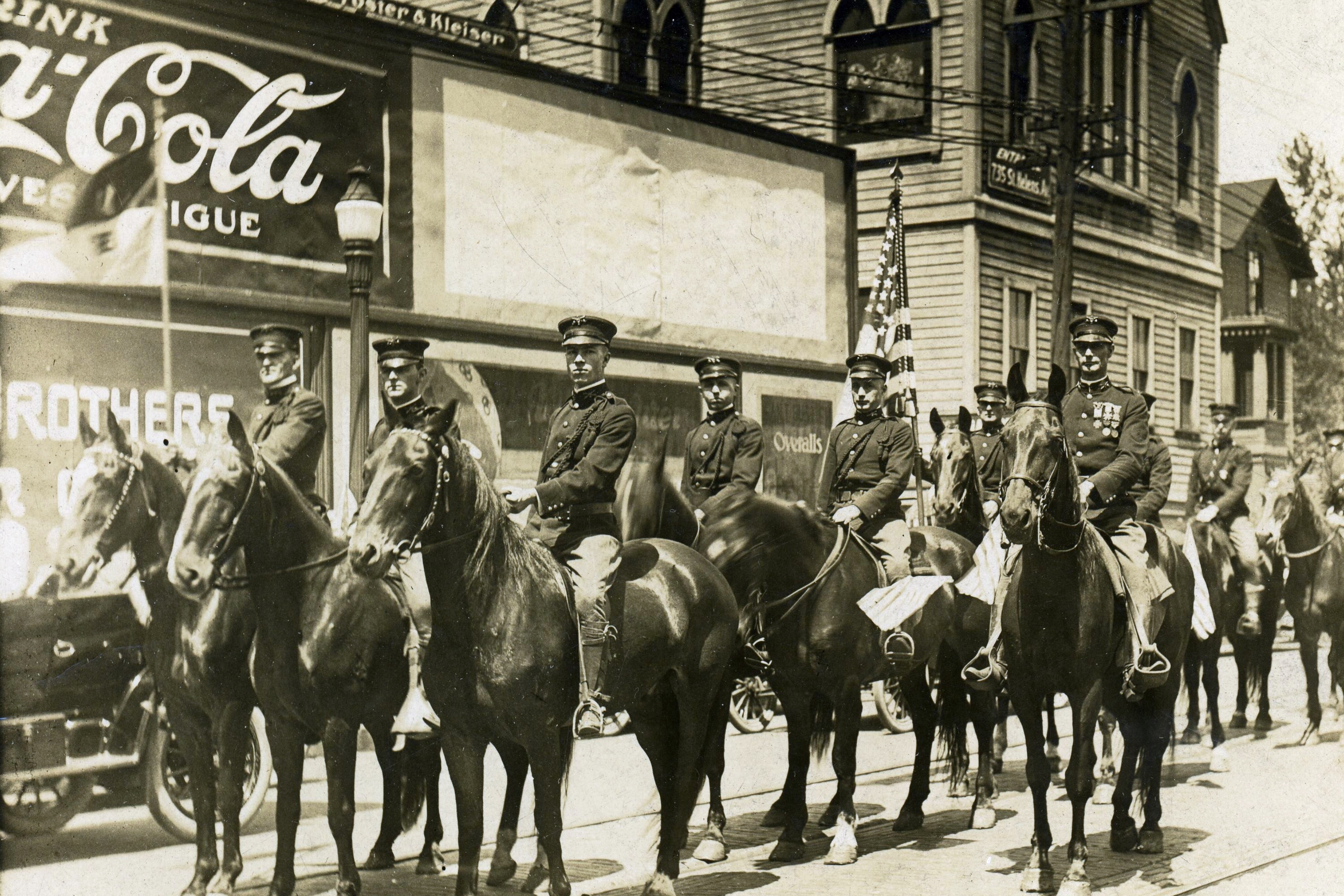
Washington Army National Guardsmen of Troop B, Washington Cavalry in Tacoma in 1907

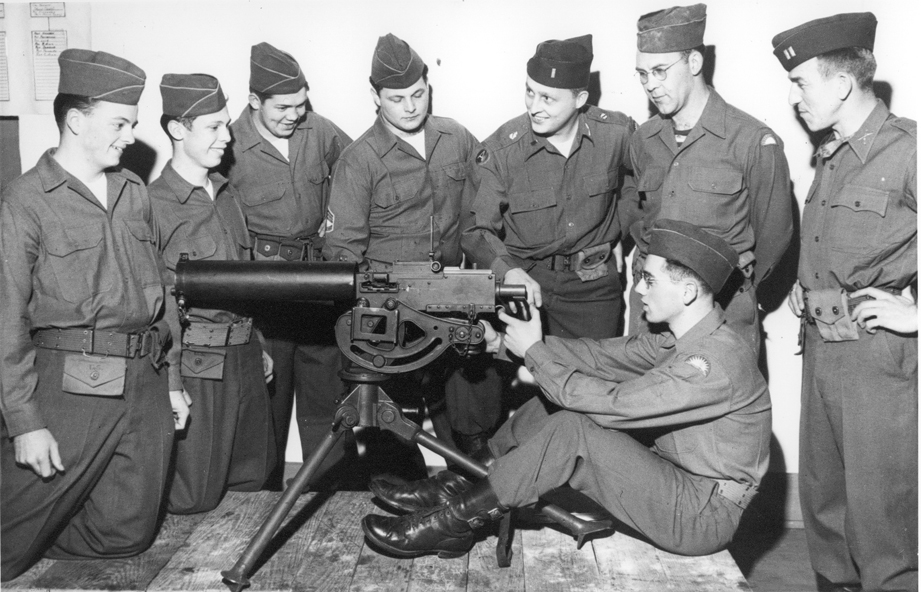
Washington Army National Guardsmen at Camp Murray after World War II

=== Activations ===
- 1917 — World War I
- 1940 — World War II
- 1948 — Flood relief in Ellensburg
- 1950 — Korean War
- 1980 — Mount St. Helens eruption
- 1990-1991 — Persian Gulf War
- 1990s — Bosnia-Herzegovina
- 1994 — Central Washington forest fires
- 1999 — Seattle WTO Protests
- 2000 — Operation Joint Guardian
- 2000 — North Macedonia
- 2002–2014 — Operation Enduring Freedom
  - 2002-2014 — Operation Enduring Freedom – Philippines
  - 2002-2014 — Operation Enduring Freedom – Horn of Africa
- 2003-2011 — Operation Iraqi Freedom
- 2006 — Eastern Washington forest fires
- 2007 — Flood relief for five western counties
- 2014–present — Operation Inherent Resolve
- 2014 — Oso landslide
- 2014 — 2014 Wildfires
- 2015 — 2015 Wildfires
- 2015-2021 — Operation Freedom's Sentinel
- 2017 — 2017 Wildfires
- 2018 — 2018 Wildfires
- 2021 ― Operation Capitol Response

=== Historic units ===
- 41st Infantry Division
- 66th Theater Aviation Command
- 116th Rear Area Operations Center (RAOC)
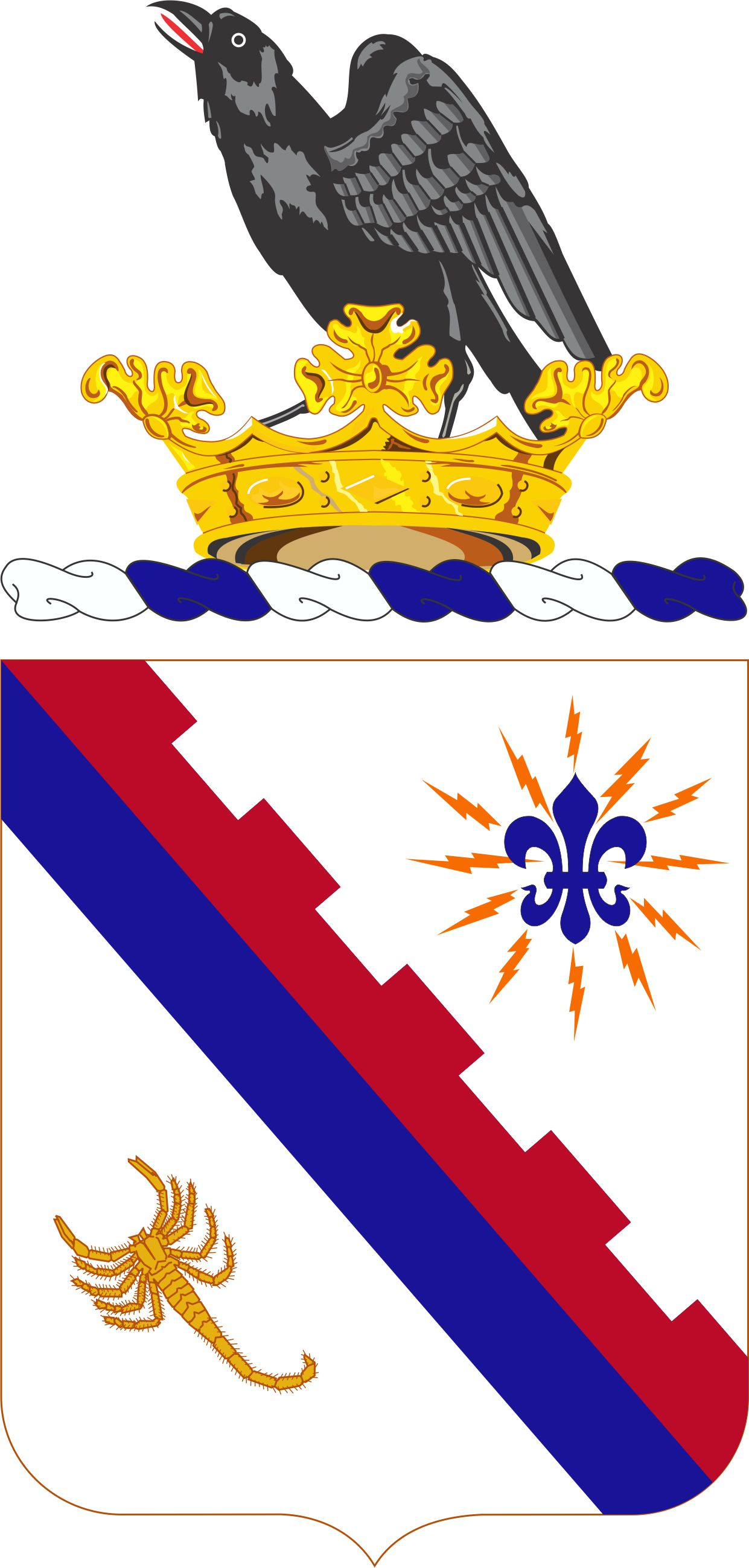
- 161st Infantry Regiment
- 144th Transportation Battalion (Terminal), Pier 23, Tacoma. The last watercraft battalion in the National Guard.
  - 506th Transportation Company: operated MV Betsy Ross (FS-313) (Sister ship of U.S.S. Pueblo)
  - 604th Transportation Detachment: operated USAV General Brehon B. Somervell (LSV-3)
  - 783rd Transportation Company: operated 100-foot long tugboats (LT), 65-foot short tugboats (ST), and the 188-foot MV Encounter Bay, purchased from the DEA after it was seized smuggling marijuana in 1988.
  - 1118th Transportation Company: operated LCM-8 landing craft
- 1444th and 241st TC Detachment
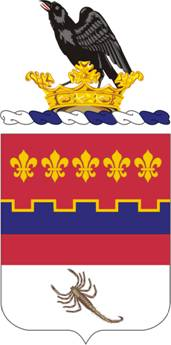
- 146th Field Artillery Regiment
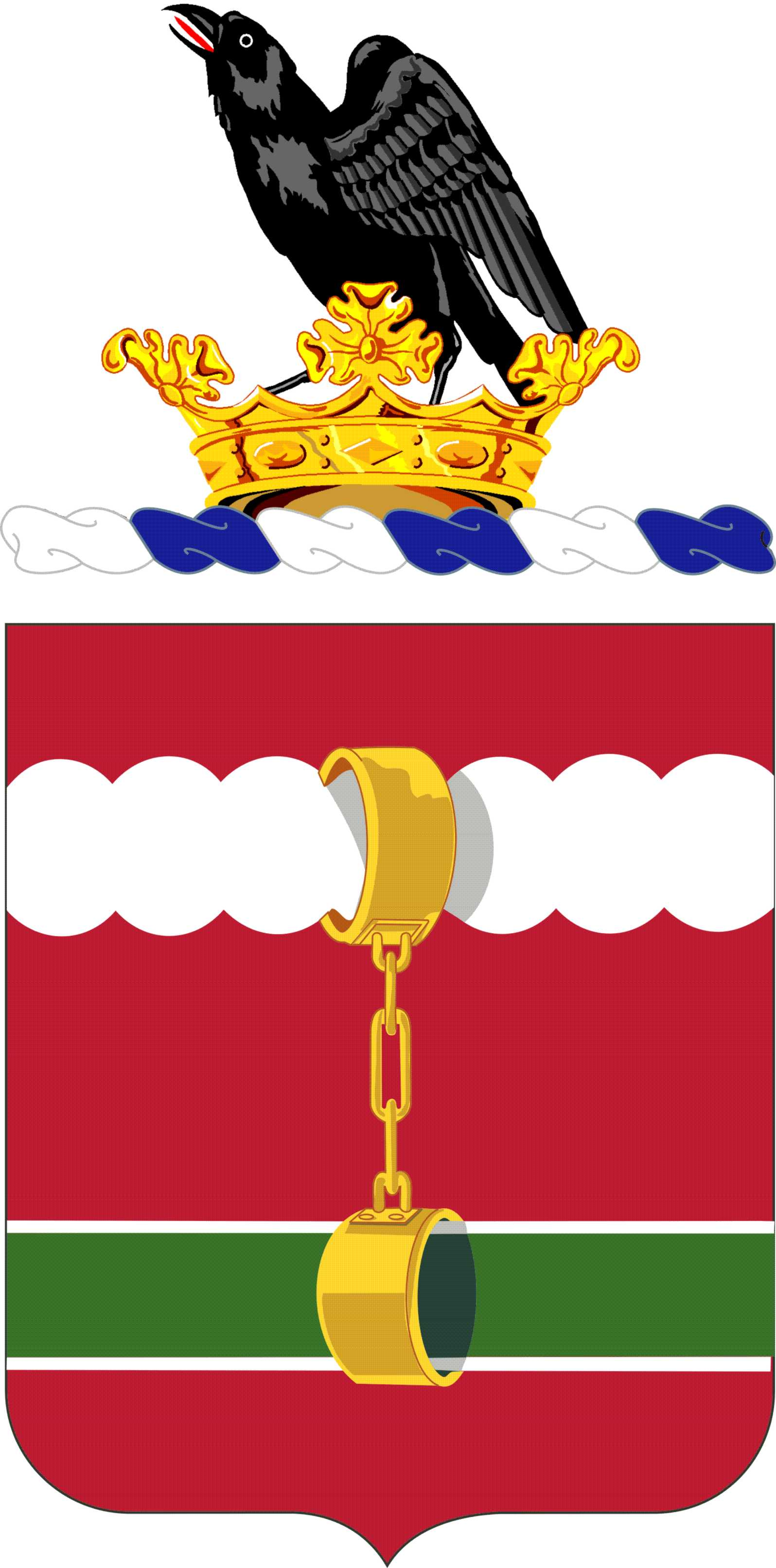
- 205th Air Defense Artillery Regiment
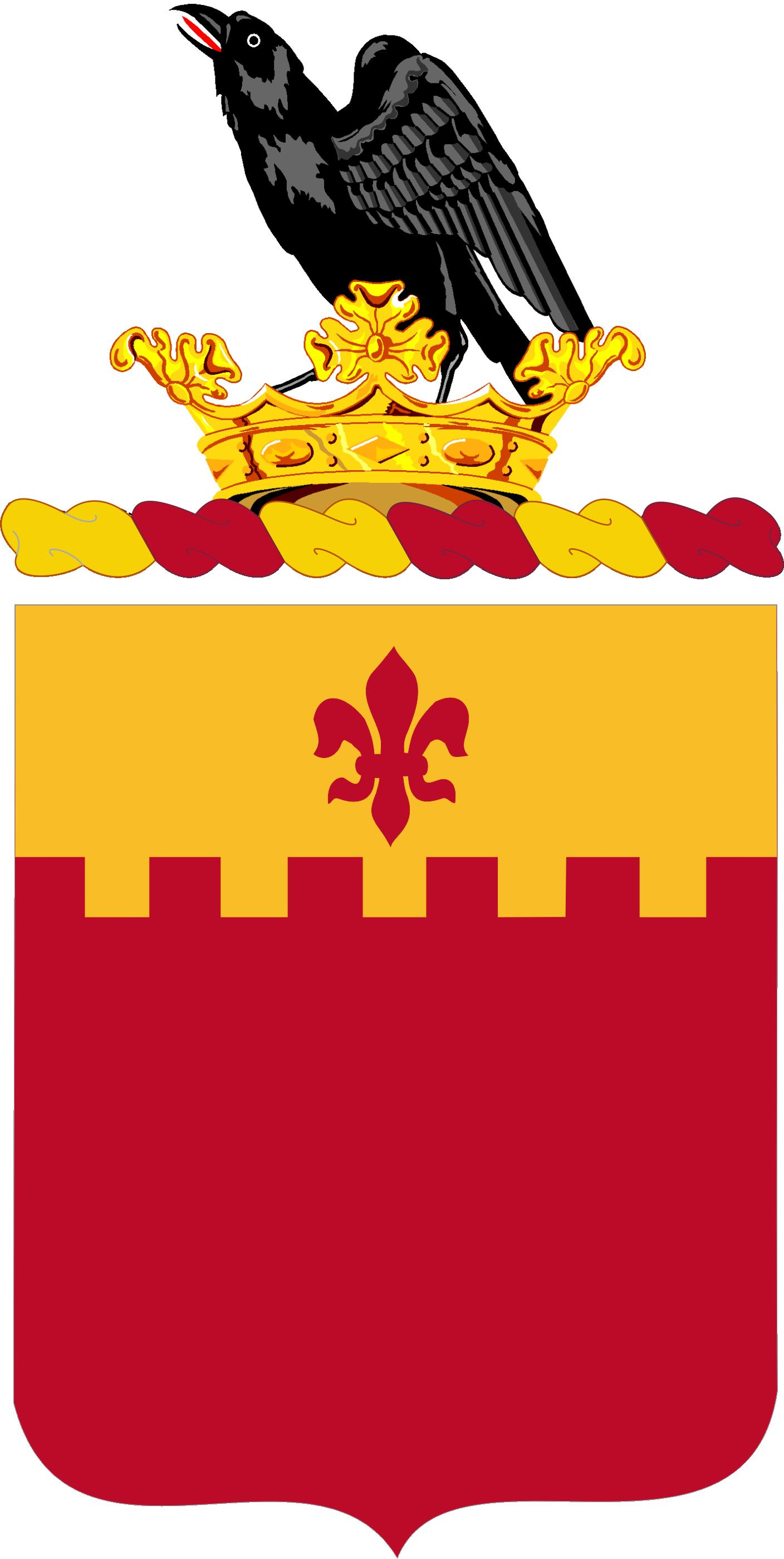
- 248th Coast Artillery Regiment
- 248th Rear Area Operations Center (RAOC)
- 303d Armor - The regiment traces its history from the 803d Tank Battalion, redesignated from 803d Tank Destroyer Battalion on 13 September 1946. Reorganized and federally recognized 18 March 1947 with HQ at Centralia. Reorganized and redesignated 15 April 1959 as the 303d Armor, with one battalion (1959-1963), two battalions (1963-1968), and one battalion from that date. Consolidated with 803d Armor (constituted 1 January 1974) between 15 April and 1 September 1993.
- 303d Cavalry Regiment - The Regiment was constituted on 1 January 1968 as the 303d Cavalry, a parent regiment under CARS, and on the same day ('concurrently') organized to consist of Troop E, a component of the 81st Infantry Brigade. Transferred from CARS to USARS 1 June 1989 with headquarters at Camp Murray. Reorganized, redesignated, and consolidated 1 May 1992, consisting (unchanged) as Troop E, a component of the 81st Infantry Brigade, at Puyallup.

== See also ==
- Troop B, Washington Cavalry
- Washington Air National Guard
- Washington State Guard
- Washington Military Department
