= 319th Explosive Ordnance Disposal Company =

319th Ordnance Company (Explosive Ordnance Disposal)
- Active: 2003 - Present
- Country: United States
- Allegiance: Washington
- Branch: United States Army
- Type: Explosive Ordnance Disposal
- Role: Tactical and technical explosives experts
- Size: Company
- Part of: Washington Army National Guard
- Garrison/HQ: Pasco, Washington
- Motto: In Periculo Ludunt
- Decorations: Presidential Unit Citation; Meritorious Unit Commendation

The 319th Ordnance Company (EOD) soldiers are one of the United States Army National Guards pre-eminent tactical and technical explosives experts. The company is part of 96th Troop Command.

== Overview ==
These soldiers are trained, equipped, and integrated to attack, defeat, and exploit unexploded ordnance (UXO), improvised explosive devices (IED), chemical, biological, and nuclear ordnance and weapons of mass destruction (WMD).

These EOD specialists perform duties locating, identifying, rendering safe and disposing of foreign and domestic conventional, biological, chemical, or nuclear ordnance and IEDs; WMDs and large vehicle bombs; they conduct intelligence gathering operations on first seen ordnance and IEDs, and support very important persons (VIP) missions for the United States Secret Service, State Department and other federal agencies.

== Commanders ==
- CPT Michael Slevin (2003–2005)
- CPT Alfred Johnson (2005–2011)
- 1LT Keith Toohey (2011)
- CPT Tammi Croteau (2012–2014)
- CPT Ryan Loyd (2014-2016)
- CPT Greg McClendon (2016-2018)
- CPT Kimberly McCarty (2018-2020)
- CPT Justin Bowen (2020-2022)
- CPT Joe Webster (2022-2024)
- CPT Garrett Franzen (2024-2026)

== Operations ==
- Operation Iraqi Freedom (2004–2005)
- Operation Enduring Freedom (2010–2011)
- Operation Allies Refuge (2021)
- Operation Epic Fury (2026)
