= Troop B, Washington Cavalry =

Historic Washington State National Guard unit

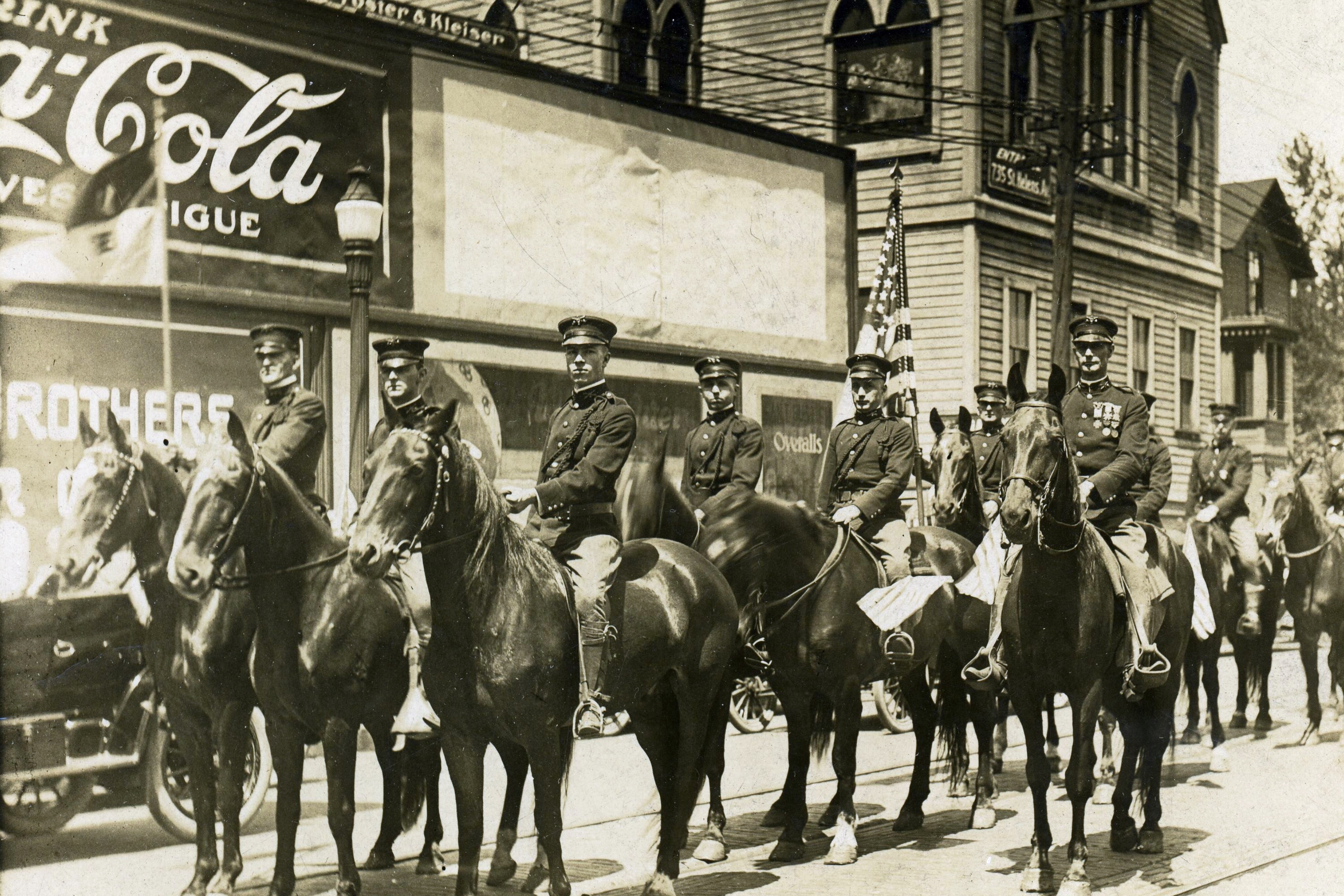
- Troop B on parade in Tacoma, Washington, in 1907
- Active: 1889–1940
- Country: Washington
- Allegiance: United States
- Branch: Washington National Guard
- Type: Cavalry
- Size: 35 (1889); 55 (1916); 99 (1922)
- Garrison/HQ: Tacoma Armory
- Engagements: Border War; World War I

Troop B, Washington Cavalry was a troop of the Washington National Guard's single regiment of cavalry. Raised in 1889, it served in California during the Mexican border war from 1916 to 1917 and in France during World War I. In 1921 it was redesignated Headquarters Troop of the 24th Cavalry Division. On the eve of World War II, it was converted into the Headquarters Company of the 103rd Anti-Tank Battalion.

== History ==
=== Formation and early history ===
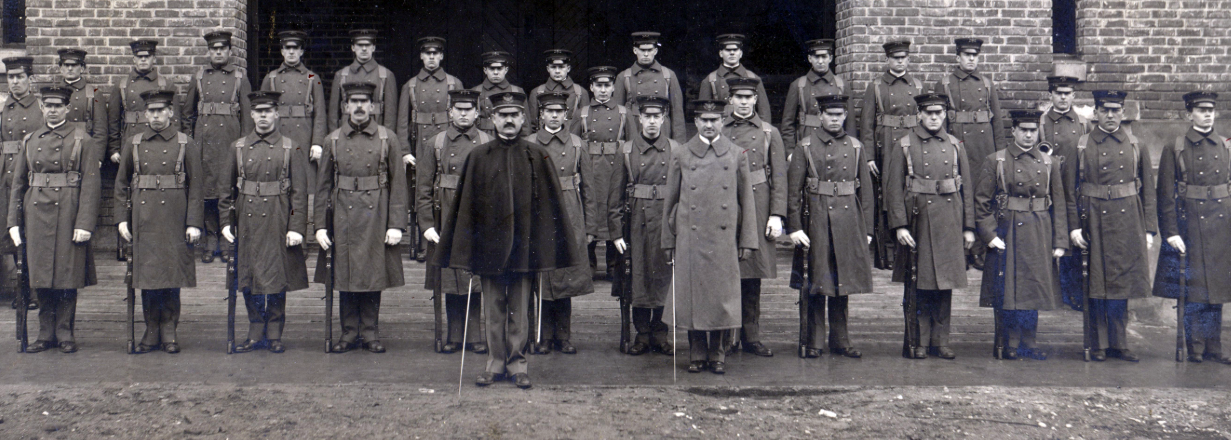
Troop B dismounted, circa 1905

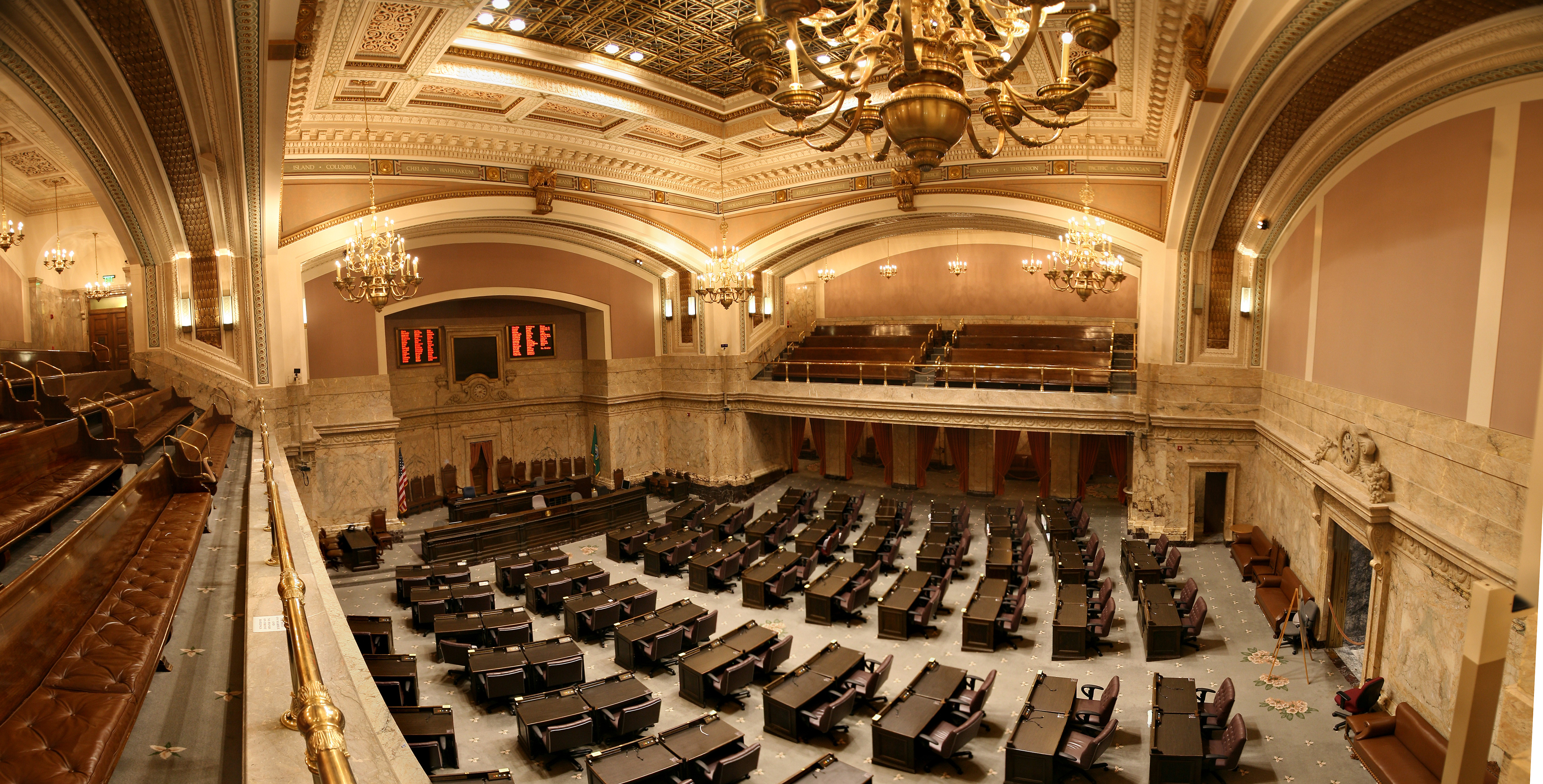
Upon return from deployment to the Mexican border, Troop B was given the liberty of the chamber of the Washington House of Representatives (pictured here in 2009).

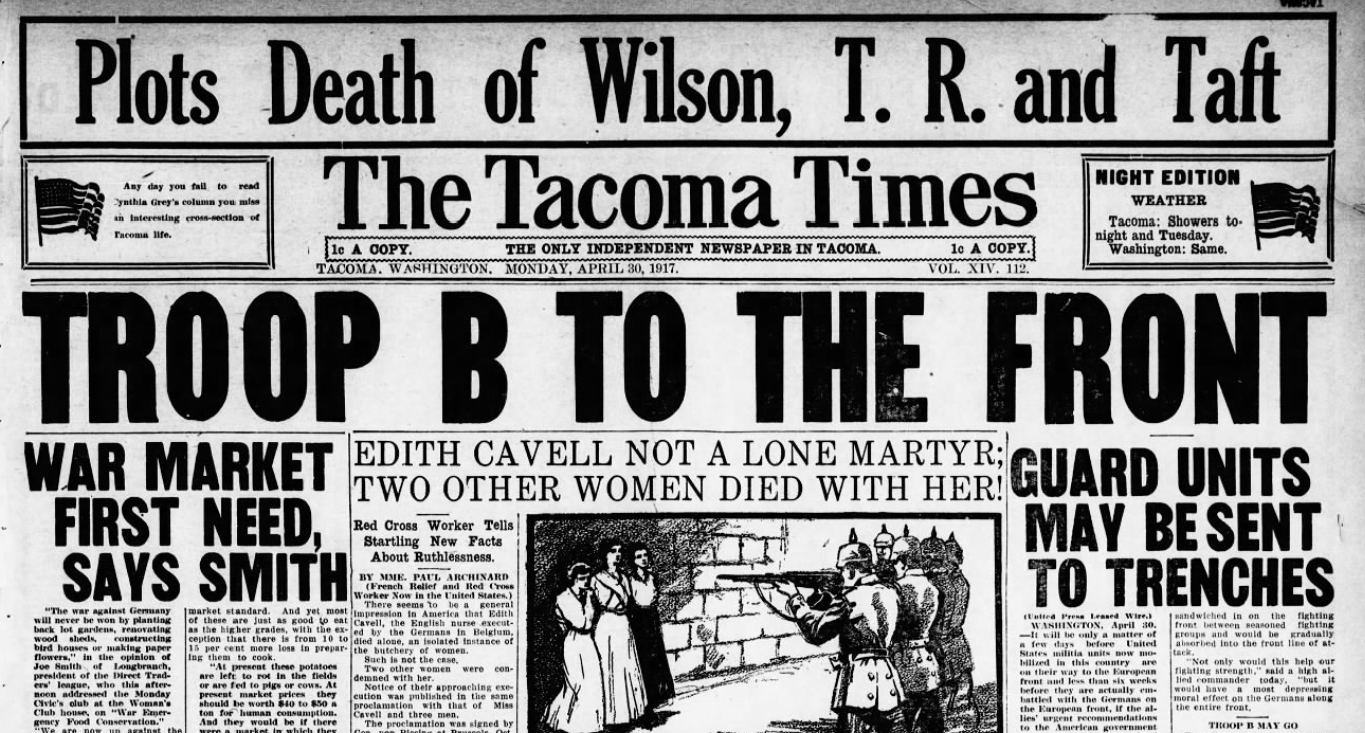
The front page of The Tacoma Times on April 30, 1917

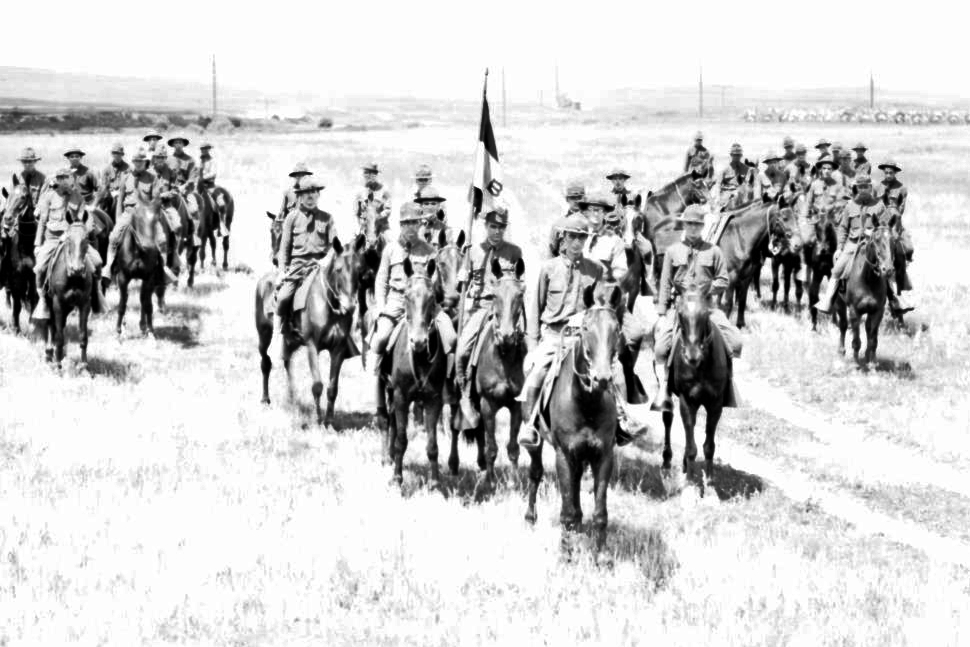
Elements of Troop B of the 58th Machine Gun Squadron, pictured in Wyoming in 1923

The Tacoma City Troop of the Washington Territorial Militia was activated in 1889 and redesignated Troop B of the Washington Cavalry, an unnumbered cavalry regiment sometimes referred to as the 1st Washington Cavalry, upon the accession of Washington to the United States that year. It served as the mounted escort to Governor of Washington Elisha P. Ferry during his inauguration in 1892.

Following the 1902 death of Governor John Rankin Rogers, eight soldiers of Troop B were assigned to provide the guard of honor for the lying in state of Rogers' remains.

In 1904, the troop participated in maneuvers at American Lake involving, in addition to other units of the Washington National Guard, elements of the Oregon National Guard and the United States Army.

=== Deployments ===
==== Mexican border emergency ====
As of March 1916 the troop had an authorized strength of 103, and an actual strength of 55.

During the Mexican border emergency of 1916, Troop B was among the Washington units called up and "performed the considerable feat of recruiting up to wartime strength and assembling at their mobilization camp in six days". The troop departed for Calexico, California by rail on June 30 and, by July 7, had set-up camp.

In late July, Sergeant W.R. Tyree commented on conditions in Calexico in a letter to his wife:

... an extension of Calexico, is Mexicali, one of the most wicked little towns in all Mexico ... [Baja California Governor Esteban] Cantú's best band is stationed in Mexicali, with his troops there, scarcely half a mile from our camp, and we hear it almost every evening.

The following November, Governor Ernest Lister departed for California to visit the men in camp.

Troop B remained on duty in California until early 1917 and was mustered out of federal service in Vancouver, Washington, in February of that year. Prior to dismissal, it was invited to the Washington House of Representatives and, by a resolution of that body, extended the liberty of the chamber, making it the only state legislature to give a National Guard unit the privileges of the house for service during the border emergency.

During the Troop B deployment, discharged veterans of the unit organized a rump replacement to maintain "a semblance of a mounted organization in Tacoma" during that year's Preparedness Day parade.

==== World War I ====
Within a few months after its return from Mexican border service, Troop B was again mobilized due to United States entry into World War I. On September 19, 1917, it was redesignated for federal service as Company B, 116th Trains, Headquarters, and Military Police, 41st Division and deployed to France.

In correspondence home in February 1918, Corporal Charles Sweet remarked that:

France is a strange but wonderful land. The customs and the people are so different from what we are accustomed to seeing that it is an education in itself just to look around ... I have seen some French soldiers over here, some of them lame and many that have been gassed. Poor fellows! And they surely put up a game fight. I admire them very much and they think the Americans are all O.K.

It was redesignated as 217th Company, Military Police Corps on November 1, 1918, and became the 267th Military Police Company on January 15, 1919. The troop was demobilized on July 14, 1919 at Fort Lewis.

=== Later history ===
Troop B was assigned to the 58th Machine Gun Squadron of the 24th Cavalry Division in June 1921; as of 1922 it reported an actual strength of four officers and 95 men. It was redesignated as Headquarters Troop of the 24th Cavalry Division on November 1, 1924. Despite its redesignation, the troop continued to be known in the Tacoma area as "Troop B."

By 1937, Headquarters Troop was the oldest extant military unit in the state of Washington.

General Orders No. 25 of September 30, 1940 converted the former Headquarters Troop, 24th Cavalry Division into Headquarters Company, 103rd Anti-Tank Battalion. (Note: The 103rd Anti-Tank Battalion was, itself, later redesignated the 803rd Tank Destroyer Battalion. One of its soldiers, Charles "Charley" Havlat, of Nebraska, is considered the last United States Army soldier to be killed in action in the European Theater of World War II.)

== Legacy ==
The Tacoma Riding Club, later the Woodbrook Hunt Club, was founded by Troop B veterans.

== Notable members ==
- Francis Cushman – member of the United States Congress
- Ensley Llewellyn – founder of the reestablished Stars and Stripes newspaper

== See also ==
- 303rd Cavalry Regiment
- Washington State Guard
