= 303rd Cavalry Regiment =

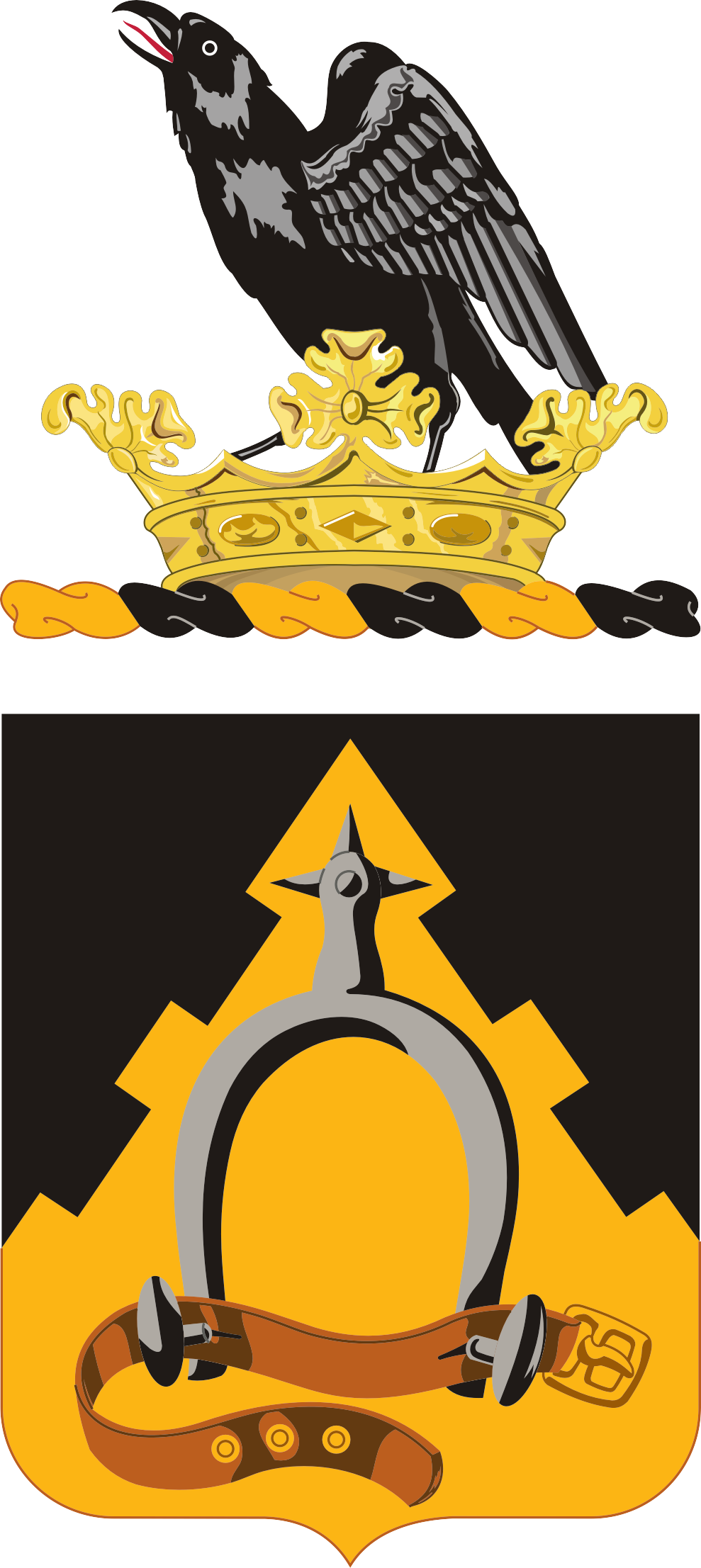
- Coat of Arms of the 303rd Cavalry
- Active: 1940–present
- Country: United States
- Branch: United States Army
- Type: Reconnaissance (Parent Regiment under United States Army Regimental System)
- Part of: 96th Troop Command (1st Squadron)
- Garrison/HQ: Vancouver, Washington (1st Squadron)
- Motto: Always in the Lead
- Engagements: World War II; Operation Iraqi Freedom

Commanders
- Current commander: LTC Eric Seeb

Insignia
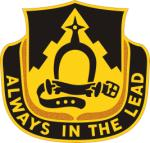
- Distinctive Unit Insignia

The 303rd Cavalry Regiment is a United States cavalry regiment, currently represented in the Washington Army National Guard (WA ARNG) by the 1st Squadron, 303rd Cavalry, headquartered at Centralia, Washington, part of the 96th Troop Command. It incorporates the lineage of the 303rd Cavalry, 303rd Armor, and 803rd Armor Regiments of the Washington Army National Guard.

== History ==
=== Predecessor units of the 303rd Armor ===
The 303rd Armor traced its lineage back to the 103rd Antitank Battalion, constituted on 14 August 1940 in the Washington National Guard. The 103rd was organized and federally recognized on 30 September from new and existing units, and was headquartered at Tacoma. After being inducted into Federal service on 10 February 1941 at home stations, it was converted into the 103rd Infantry Battalion, Antitank, on 24 July 1941. On 15 December 1941, after the United States entered World War II, it became the 803rd Tank Destroyer Battalion.

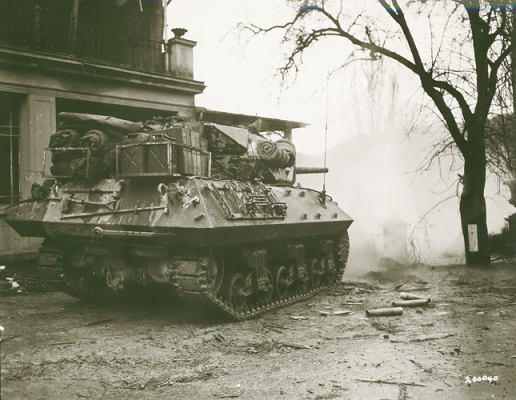
An M10 tank destroyer from the battalion firing on a German pillbox on the other side of the Sauer River near Echternach, Luxembourg, supporting an advance by the 5th Infantry Division's 11th Infantry Regiment.

On 24 June 1943, the battalion departed for England. Days after Allied troops landed in Normandy on 6 June, the 803rd landed at Omaha Beach on 13 June, equipped with the M10 tank destroyer. It helped capture Saint-Lô during the Battle of Saint-Lô in July. The battalion rapidly advanced across northern France in August when German lines disintegrated and through Belgium and Holland before reaching the Siegfried Line in September, where the Allied advance bogged down. In October, it supported operations north of Aachen and transferred to the Hürtgen Forest. Just before the Battle of the Bulge began in December, the 803rd was relocated to the Ardennes. It was sent into the renewed assault against the Siegfried Line in early 1945 and converted to the M36 tank destroyer in February. The battalion fought in the capture of Trier and the crossing of the Rhine at Oppenheim on 23 March. The 803rd helped eliminate the Ruhr Pocket in April, then advanced southeast through Austria and Czechoslovakia, ending the war there in May. During its combat service, the battalion was attached to the 82nd Airborne Division, 3rd Armored Division, 2nd Infantry Division, 5th Infantry Division, 8th Infantry Division, 29th Infantry Division, 30th Infantry Division, and the 1st Belgian Brigade. The 803rd was inactivated postwar at Camp Kilmer, New Jersey on 1 December 1945.

On 13 September 1946, the 803rd became a tank battalion, and was allocated to the state of Washington, with an authorized strength of 607 men on 31 October. It was reorganized and federally recognized on 18 March 1947 with its headquarters at Centralia, under the command of Lieutenant Colonel Lilburn H. Stevens. Between 29 May and 5 June 1948, Stevens led 44 men from the battalion in flood control duty during the 1948 floods along the Columbia River. On 1 February 1949, it was redesignated the 803rd Heavy Tank Battalion, and joined the 41st Infantry Division. On 1 September 1950, it was redesignated yet again, dropping the "Heavy" designation.

=== 303rd Armor ===
On 15 April 1959, the 803rd was reorganized and redesignated as a Combat Arms Regimental System (CARS) parent regiment, the 303rd Armor. The new regiment included the 1st Tank Battalion, part of the 41st Infantry Division . On 1 April 1960, the battalion became the 1st Medium Tank Battalion. The 303rd added a 2nd Battalion in the Oregon Army National Guard on 1 March 1963 and its 1st Battalion simultaneously joined the Washington Army National Guard. Both battalions remained part of the 41st Division.

On 1 January 1968, the 303rd Armor was reorganized to consist of the 1st Battalion, part of the 81st Infantry Brigade. On 1 June 1989, the regiment was withdrawn from the CARS and reorganized as a parent regiment under the United States Army Regimental System (USARS). Between 15 April and 1 September 1993, the 303rd was consolidated with the 803rd Armor, which had been organized on 1 January 1974 in the WA ARNG as a CARS parent regiment. The 803rd included a 1st Battalion, created from existing units in northwest Washington. On 1 June 1989, it was reorganized under USARS after being withdrawn from CARS with its headquarters at Everett. The new unit retained the designation of the 303rd Armor and its 1st Battalion remained with the 81st Brigade.

=== 303rd Cavalry and predecessor units ===
Troop E, 303rd Cavalry was first organized at Tacoma in November 1889 as the Tacoma City Troop. It was reorganized on 27 June 1890 as Troop B, 1st Cavalry, Washington National Guard. On 28 June 1916, it was mustered into Federal service at Camp Murray to guard the Mexican border in place of Regular Army units deployed to support the Pancho Villa Expedition. Mustered out on 15 February 1917 at Vancouver Barracks, it was drafted into Federal service on 5 August at Tacoma after the United States entered World War I. On 19 September, it was redesignated Company B, 116th Train Headquarters and Military Police, 41st Division. It was redesignated as 217th Company, Military Police Corps on 1 November 1918, and became the 267th Military Police Company on 15 January 1919. The company was demobilized on 14 July 1919 at Fort Lewis.

It was reorganized and Federally recognized on 18 August 1920 at Tacoma as Troop B, 2nd Cavalry, Washington National Guard. It became B Troop, 58th Machine Gun Squadron, Cavalry, on 16 May 1922, conducting annual summer training at Camp Murray. It was redesignated as Headquarters Troop, 24th Cavalry Division on 1 November 1924. On 30 September 1940, it was redesignated as Headquarters Company, 103rd Antitank Battalion. Inducted into Federal service on 10 February 1941 at Tacoma, the battalion became the 103rd Infantry Battalion, Antitank, on 24 July 1941, and the 803rd Tank Destroyer Battalion on 15 December. The headquarters company was inactivated along with the battalion on 1 December 1945 at Camp Kilmer. On 5 July 1946, the battalion became the 803rd Tank Battalion. The company was reorganized and Federally recognized on 18 March 1947 at Centralia. On 1 February 1949, it became Headquarters, Headquarters, and Service Company, 803rd Heavy Tank Battalion. The battalion dropped the "Heavy" designation on 1 September 1950. On 15 April 1959, the company became Headquarters and Headquarters Company (HHC), 1st Battalion, 303rd Armor. The battalion became a medium tank battalion on 1 April 1960 and dropped the medium tank battalion designation on 1 March 1963.

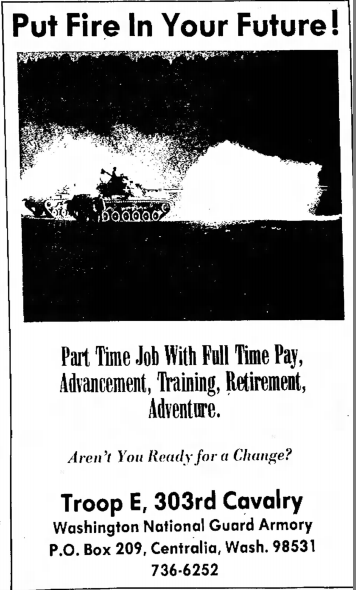
A 1977 newspaper recruiting advertisement for Troop E, 303rd Cavalry

The other regiment in the modern 303rd's lineage, the 303rd Cavalry, was constituted on 1 January 1968 in the WA ARNG, a CARS parent regiment. It included Troop E, part of the 81st Infantry Brigade. On 1 June 1989, the regiment was withdrawn from CARS and reorganized under USARS. On 15 November 2003, the 303rd Cavalry was ordered into active Federal service at Puyallup. It was released from active service on 13 May 2005 and reverted to state control.

On 1 September, the 303rd Armor was consolidated with the 303rd Cavalry, a USARS parent regiment, consisting of the 1st Squadron, part of the 81st Armored Brigade Combat Team. The new unit adopted the 303rd Cavalry's name. On 1 October, it was redesignated as the 303rd Cavalry Regiment. On 16 August 2008, the 303rd was ordered into active Federal service at home stations. It deployed to Iraq to participate in Operation Iraqi Freedom with the rest of the 81st Brigade, and after returning home was released from active Federal service on 19 September 2009. During the 2014 Washington wildfires, the 1/303rd was called up for firefighting duty in the Chiwaukum Complex during July 2014, and was commended for its performance by the Washington State Legislature in February 2015. In August 2015, the 1st Squadron was called up for state service to fight record wildfires.

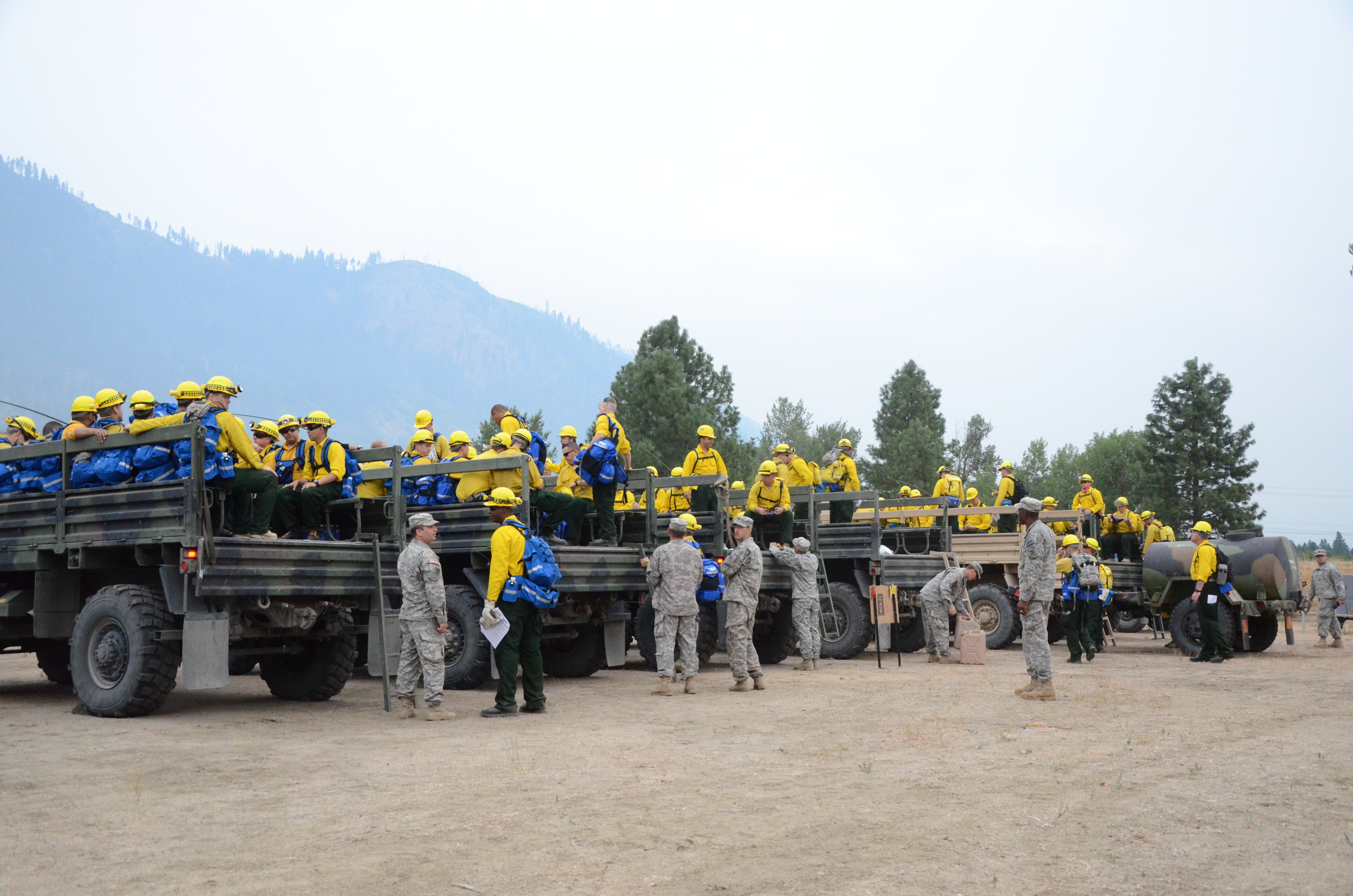
1/303rd Guardsmen depart for final training to assist in firefighting during the 2014 Washington wildfires

On 21 February 2016, the 1st Squadron was inactivated as the 81st Brigade transformed into a Stryker Brigade Combat Team. The squadron was reactivated on 7 May 2016 at the Camp Rilea Armed Forces Training Center in Warrenton, Oregon, operationally controlled by the 96th Troop Command. In event of mobilization, it was to become part of the Oregon Army National Guard's 41st Infantry Brigade Combat Team. The 303rd's headquarters was moved to Vancouver from Kent. Lieutenant Colonel Chris Blanco took command of the new 1st Squadron. The 1/303rd was replaced at Kent on 28 August by the reactivation of the 3rd Battalion, 161st Infantry, forming part of the 81st Stryker Brigade Combat Team. In September 2019, the 303rd Cavalry Regiment was mobilized in support of Operation Spartan Shield. The main body was deployed to Joint Training Center Jordan, while the B Troop was placed in Bahrain. The unit later demobilized in Fort Bliss, TX in mid-June and early July 2020. In October 2020, the 303rd was activated on a state level in response to possible civil unrest prior to and after the 2020 November elections. They were later activated in January 2021 following the trespassing on the Governor's residence and prior to President Biden's Inauguration, remaining in the state capitol of Olympia for three weeks.

== Honors ==
=== Campaign streamers ===
The 303rd is entitled to the following Campaign streamers: Iraq War campaign streamers are not yet listed on the Center of Military History's official lineage and honors document, but are listed here based on 303rd's deployment dates.

Conflict	Streamer	Dates of campaign
World War II	Normandy	6 June–24 July 1944
World War II	Northern France	25 July–14 September 1944
World War II	Rhineland	15 September 1944 – 21 March 1945
World War II	Ardennes-Alsace	16 December 1944 – 25 January 1945
World War II	Central Europe	22 March–11 May 1945
Iraq War	Iraqi Surge	10 January 2007 – 31 December 2008
Iraq War	Iraqi Sovereignty	1 January 2009 – 31 August 2010

Headquarters Troop, 1st Squadron, is additionally entitled to the following streamers:

Conflict	Streamer	Dates of campaign
World War II	Guadalcanal	7 August 1942 – 21 February 1943
World War II	New Guinea	24 January 1943 – 31 December 1944
World War II	Northern Solomons	22 February 1943 – 21 November 1944
World War II	Luzon	15 December 1944 – 4 July 1945
World War II	Southern Philippines	27 February–4 July 1945

Troop A, 1st Squadron, is additionally entitled to the following streamer:

Streamer
World War I without inscription

=== Decorations ===
Headquarters Troop, 1st Squadron is entitled to the following decorations:

- Philippine Presidential Unit Citation, Streamer embroidered 17 October 1944 to 4 July 1945

Troop A, 1st Squadron is entitled to the following decorations:

- Presidential Unit Citation (Army), Streamer embroidered Hurtgen Forest
- Belgian Fourragere 1940
- Cited in the Order of the Day of the Belgian Army for action in Belgium
- Cited in the Order of the Day of the Belgian Army for action along the river Meuse
