= Elizabeth Piper Ensley =

American educator, suffragist, journalist and activist

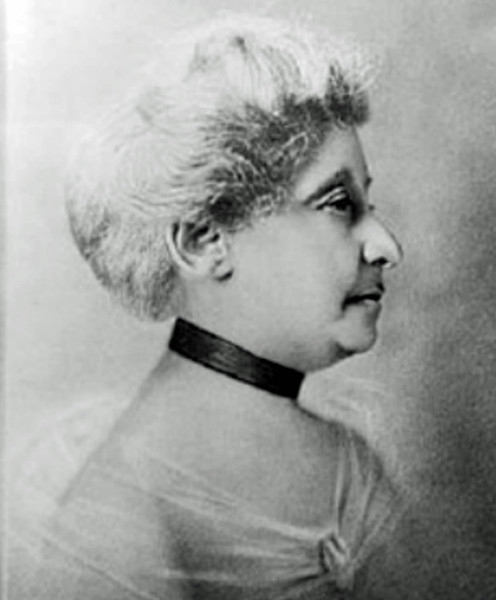
- Born: Elizabeth Piper; January 19, 1847; New Bedford, Massachusetts, US
- Died: February 23, 1919 (aged 72); Denver, Colorado, US
- Known for: Women's suffrage
- Spouse: Newell Houston Ensley (m. 1882)
- Children: 3

Elizabeth Piper Ensley (January 19, 1847 – February 23, 1919), was an educator and an African-American suffragist. Born in Massachusetts, Ensley was a teacher on the eastern coast of the country. She moved to Colorado where she achieved prominence as a leader in the Colorado suffrage movement. She was also a journalist, activist, and a leader and founder of local women's clubs.

== Early life and education ==
Although some sources claim that Ensley was born in 1848 in the Caribbean, census and marriage records, as well as her grave, place her birth at New Bedford, Massachusetts, on January 19, 1847. Her father, Phillip F. Piper, was born in Virginia and her mother, Jane Gibson, was born in Georgia. (Note: Philip, born about 1820, was the son of William and Amelia Piper. William Piper, a former slave in Alexandria, Virginia, was a domestic servant for William Rotch Rodman, who earned his income from the banking and whaling industries. Piper, known for his skill in caring for horses, lived at 54 Bedford Street, two blocks from Rodman's residence at 58 Bedford Street, in what is now a historical area in New Bedford. Former slaves often became part of the middle class in New Bedford. Piper's wife, Amelia, was also a former slave.) Her father worked on the ship Rebecca Simms. (Note: In 1839, he was a captain of Rebecca Simms (sailed out of New Bedford - general trading service; refitted as a whaler before 1850) and lived at 87 S. Sixth Street, New Bedford, Massachusetts.) In 1868, she graduated from the West Newton English and Classical School, also known as the Allen School. From 1869 to December 1870, she traveled to England and Europe. (Note: It is said that during the early 1870s, Ensley studied abroad in Germany and Switzerland, but she is said to have returned to the United States in December 1870.)

== Marriage and children ==
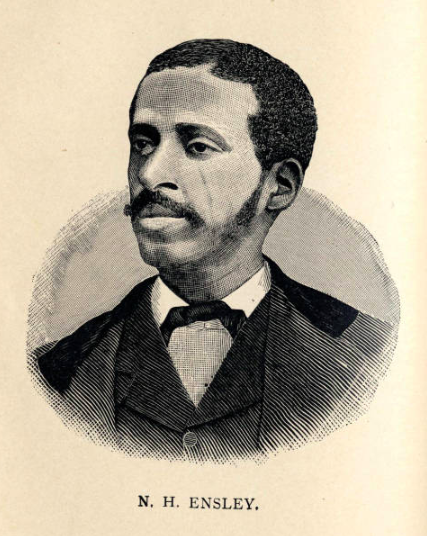
Newell Houston Ensley (1852-1888)

She married her husband Newell Houston Ensley on September 4, 1882, in Boston. Newell, born in Nashville, Tennessee on August 23, 1852, was the son of Clara and George Ensley. Born into slavery, he was owned by his maternal grandfather who hired a teacher to teach him to read and write. (Note: Both of his parents were literate. He was a buggy boy, servant, and rent collector to his grandfather. After the Civil War, he was a paid worker for his grandfather, until his death. His mother was established in a cabin on 30 acres in 1866.) After the Civil War, Newell worked and attended a school near her home and became the teacher and a Sunday school teacher. He desired to become a preacher. (Note: He toured the north with Dr. Phillips, representing the Home Mission schools.) He graduated third in his class from Roger Williams University in Nashville in June 1878, and then attended Newton Theological Seminary in Massachusetts, where he was the only black man in his graduating class (ca. 1881). He first taught Latin and theology at a school in Raleigh, North Carolina. He was a professor of rhetoric, Hebrew, and science at Howard University and Alcorn State University. Among his favored topics were "Toussaint L'Ouverture," "Pluck versus Luck," "The Rights of Women," "Temperance" and "The Rights of the Negro." They had three children: Roger (b. 1883), Charlotte (b. 1885), and Jean (March 1888 – June 1888).

They lived in Washington in 1880s, and then Mississippi, before moving to Denver, Colorado in 1887 or 1888. (Note: Jameson states that she came to Denver in the early 1890s.) The African-American community was only about 2% of Denver's total population. Newell died in Denver, Colorado, on May 23, 1888. Ensley lived at 855 S. Emerson, in a craftsman house. She also lived at 1722 Logan, Denver, Colorado in 1900, when her mother and her two surviving children (of three) lived with her.

== Career ==
Upon returning from Europe on December 22, 1870, she established a circulating library in Boston and became a public school teacher, working in Trenton, New Jersey. From 1882 to 1883, Elizabeth was a member of the faculty of Howard University. She taught at Alcorn State University in Mississippi before moving to Denver. Ensley was the Denver correspondent for The Woman's Era, the national publication of the National Association of Colored Women's Clubs (NACWC) by 1894, when she reported on the first election in which women could vote. It was the first monthly newspaper published by and for African-American woman.

== Activism ==
=== Relief efforts ===
Due to the Silver Panic of 1893, miners who had lost their jobs were in Denver with their families. In Colorado, Elizabeth joined Denver's relief efforts for the poor and the homeless, contacting people that she knew in Washington, D.C., and Boston to help fund relief efforts.

=== Suffrage and politics ===
Women had the right to vote in school board elections, but not in other elections, in accordance with the state constitution of 1876. Inspired by her experiences with the women's suffrage groups in Boston, Elizabeth joined the campaign to put a women's suffrage amendment on the November 1893 ballot in Colorado, so that women could vote in all elections. She was the treasurer of the Colorado Non-Partisan Equal Suffrage Association, and beginning with a fund of 25 dollars, helped gain the money necessary for the campaign. Ensley worked to persuade African-American men to vote in favor of voting rights for women. The suffrage amendment was approved in November 1893, making Colorado the second state to grant voting rights to women.

Alongside Ida Clark DePriest, she organized the Colorado Colored Women's Republican Club to teach African-American women to be educated voters. While she identified most with the Republican Party, she wrote that "there should be thorough and systematic organization of the women of all parties."

She established the Women's League in 1894 to inform black women how to vote, communicate the importance of voting, and communicate the nature of the issues. She was also very involved in ensuring equality for all and civil rights.

=== Women's clubs ===
She founded the Colorado Association of Colored Women's Clubs (CACW) in 1904, which created a stronger alliance by joining eight organizations throughout Colorado. The CACW led community and educational programs, including the George Washington Carver Day Nursery. Ensley served as the second Vice President of the Colorado State Federation of Colored Women's Clubs. She delivered an address to the Federation in 1906 titled "Women and the Ballot." Ensley was the only African-American member of the predominantly white board of the Colorado Federation of Women's Clubs.

== Death and legacy ==
She died on February 23, 1919, in Denver, (Note: The Friends of the Riverside Cemetery stated that she died on June 6, 1919, but The New York Age had reported in March of that year that she died on February 23.) at the home of her daughter, Charlotte Ensley Britton. She is buried in the Ensley family plot at Riverside Cemetery in Denver, Colorado.

In 2020, Ensley was posthumously named an honoree of the National Women's History Alliance and inducted into the Colorado Women's Hall of Fame.
