= Ida Clark DePriest =

American suffragist (c.1869–1938)

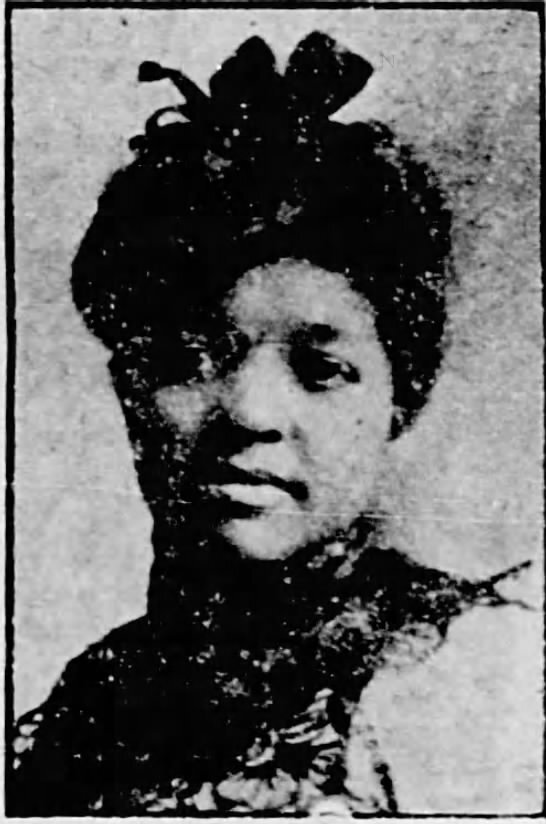
- Born: 1869; Kansas
- Died: August 1938 (aged 68–69)
- Occupation: Suffragist

Ida Clark DePriest (c. 1869 – August 1938) was an African-American suffragist, activist, and clubwoman, known for her work for women's suffrage in Colorado.

== Biography ==
Ida Clark was born in Kansas around 1869 to Mary Ellen Clark, and had one brother, Duff. Clark grew up in Colorado, graduating from Denver High School in 1889. In 1891, she married painter Richard K. DePriest in 1891, and the couple had a son named Claude H. DePriest around 1895, as well as a second child who died in infancy.

Ida C. DePriest dedicated her career to political activism, working to register and educate Colorado's women voters, who had gained suffrage in 1893. Alongside Elizabeth Piper Ensley, she founded the Colored Women's Republican Club of Colorado, which was instrumental in the election of Joseph Henry Stuart, a black lawyer, to the Colorado State Legislature in 1894. From 1895 to 1896, DePriest served as corresponding secretary to the Woman's League of Denver, an organization affiliated with the State Association of Colored Women's Clubs. In 1895, DePriest was elected vice president of the Colorado State Republican League, and often hosted club meetings and events at her home. In October of that year, DePriest and Lizzie Olden attended the first annual meeting of the Colorado Federation of Women's Clubs in Colorado Springs, as the only two black delegates from the Denver Women's League. Addressing an audience of mostly white women, DePriest presented a paper discussing trends in popular literature. Her work was well received by the other clubwomen at the meeting.

In addition to her club work, DePriest was also interested in education. She was a founding member of the Colored Women's League of Denver, a chapter of the National Association of Colored Women's Clubs (NACW), organized in 1894 to provide educational and social services to African American children. The club adopted the NACW's motto "Lifting as We Climb." In August 1911, DePriest attended a meeting of the National Negro Educational Congress in Denver as a delegate.

DePriest held a clerk position in the office of Colorado Secretary of State Timothy O'Connor, but resigned in 1909 after becoming the target of racist remarks from Secretary Elect James B. Pearce. Perhaps because few political jobs were open to black women, she later took a position as a maid at The Denver Dry Goods Company. Still, DePriest remained active in various Colorado women's clubs throughout her life, and worked for Denver's Election Commissioner in 1916, registering voters before the presidential election.

DePriest died on July 28, 1938 in Pasadena, California at the age of 69. Though she spent the later years of her life in California with her son, she is buried in Riverside Cemetery in Denver.
