= Rear Area Operations Center =

A Rear Area Operations Center (RAOC) was a U.S. Army MTOE unit that served as a command and control facility that provided an rear area and/or sub-area commander's planning, coordinating, monitoring, advising and directing agency for area security operations.

According to U.S. doctrine, a RAOC is a reserve component organization of approximately 30 personnel that contains no organic life support capabilities. It must rely on another sustainment brigade or group headquarters to which they are assigned for those functions. When deployed, an assigned sustainment brigade usually has tactical control authority over it while operational control authority is retained by a corps rear area commander.

RAOCs have been operationally deployed to Operation Desert Storm and Operation Iraqi Freedom. It is believed that the U.S. Army has deactivated all RAOCs.

== Units ==
Unit	Years active	Affiliation	Notes
35th Rear Area Operations Center		Missouri Army National Guard	
25th Rear Area Operations Center		Arkansas Army National Guard	
44th Rear Area Operations Center		Illinois Army National Guard	
51st Rear Area Operations Center	-May 2013	South Carolina Army National Guard	
53rd Rear Area Operations Center		New York Army National Guard	
116th Rear Area Operations Center	Oct 1971-Sep 2006	Washington Army National Guard	Lineage carried over to 56th Theater Information Operations Group
251st Rear Area Operations Center	-May 2013	South Carolina Army National Guard	
248th Rear Area Operations Center		Washington Army National Guard	
258th Rear Area Operations Center		Arizona Army National Guard	
