= Roger Williams University (Tennessee) =

Historically black college in Nashville, Tennessee

Coordinates: 36.2024°N 86.7901°W

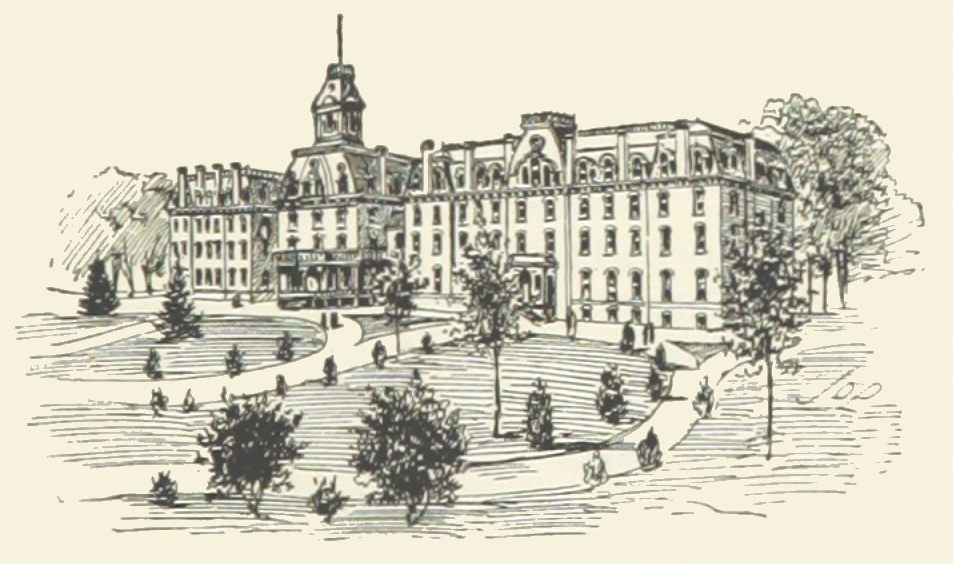
- Former names: Nashville Normal and Theological Institute
- Active: 1866–1929
- Founder: American Baptist Home Mission Society
- Location: Nashville, Tennessee, United States
- Campus: Currently occupied by American Baptist College

Roger Williams University was a historically black college in Nashville, Tennessee. It was founded in 1866 as the Nashville Normal and Theological Institute by the American Baptist denomination, which established numerous schools and colleges in the South. Renamed for Roger Williams, the founder of the First Baptist Church in America, it became the largest Baptist college in the area for educating African Americans. It was founded in a period when Protestant mission groups sponsored numerous educational facilities for freedmen in the South.

By 1874, the college occupied a 28-acre site on a knoll near Hillsboro Pike. In 1905, its buildings were destroyed by two fires of suspicious origin, which led it to close. In 1908, it opened with a new campus at a different location. By 1922, there were only 159 students and 12 faculty members. On July 12, 1927, the decision was made to merge with Howe Institute in Memphis. The students and teachers left for Memphis on December 29, 1929.

== History ==
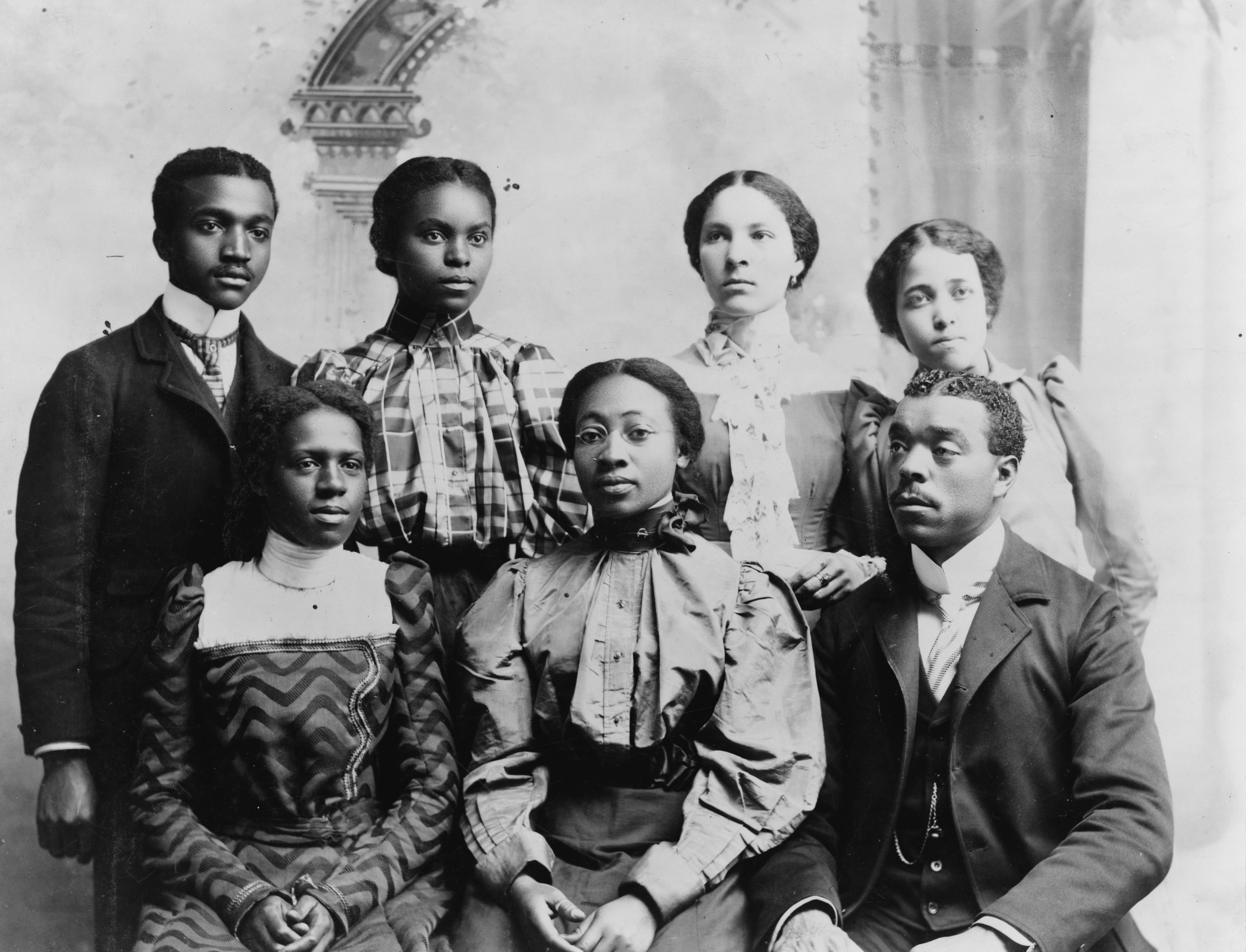
A group of students in 1899

Daniel W. Phillips, a white minister and freedmen's missionary from Massachusetts, taught the first classes at what was called Nashville Institute. In 1866, the Baptist Home Mission Board sponsored selected African-American men for the first classes here, including Hardin Smith and Martin Winfield from Haywood County, Tennessee. After they returned to their home communities of Nutbush and Brownsville, respectively, they became ministers and founded several Baptist churches in the area, as well as the first school for freedmen in the county.

In 1874, the college, now known as Roger Williams University after Roger Williams, the Baptist founder of the Colony of Rhode Island and Providence Plantations and one of the first abolitionists, built a campus on a 28-acre site near Hillsboro Pike in Nashville. In 1886 it added a master's degree program. It operated here until 1905, when "the main building of Roger Williams burned on the night of January 24...and the last of the two Roger Williams buildings burned the night of May 22. News stories contained suggestions of incendiary origin..." The campus was sold by developers posing as a Christian missionary agency, under a restrictive covenant barring African Americans from living on the land. The school closed for three years; the site is currently occupied by Peabody College (merged in 1979 with Vanderbilt University). After Baptist fundraising Roger Williams reopened in 1908 at a new location. In 1922 it had 159 students and 12 faculty.

Numerous African Americans who became teachers, ministers, doctors, and other leaders in the South were educated here throughout the 19th and early 20th centuries. Graduates included William Madison McDonald, who became an influential Republican politician in Texas.

In 1929, the university, already afflicted by financial problems made worse by the stock market crash of 1929, ceased operations; students and faculty were moved to Howe Institute in Memphis (today LeMoyne–Owen College). The site is currently occupied by American Baptist College, a historically black college, and the World Baptist Center.

== Honors ==
- The site of the college from 1874 to 1905 near Hillsboro Pike is commemorated by a state historical marker.

== Notable alumni and faculty ==
- Allen Allensworth
- William Herbert Brewster, Sr., gospel composer
- Newell Houston Ensley
- Betty Hill, civil rights leader
- Elijah P. Marrs, faculty in 1874
- William Madison McDonald, politician in Texas
- Inman E. Page, president of Roger Williams in 1920 and 1921
- Chasteen C. Stumm, minister, newspaper publisher, journalist, and teacher; attended Roger Williams in the 1870s
- Randal B. Vandavall, co-founder and early trustee
