= Peter Densley =

Australian rules footballer

Personal information
- Full name: Peter Densley
- Born: 1 June 1964 (age 62)
- Original teams: Scots School, Albury
- Height: 178 cm (5 ft 10 in)
- Weight: 70 kg (154 lb)

Playing career^{1}
Years	Club	Games (Goals)
1984	North Melbourne	11 (4)
- ^{1} Playing statistics correct to the end of 1984.

Peter Densley (born 1 June 1964) is a former Australian rules footballer who played with North Melbourne in the Victorian Football League (VFL).
