= Neely's Bend =

Coordinates: 36.219221°N 86.659441°W

Neely's Bend is a major bend in the Cumberland River just northeast of Nashville, Tennessee and south of the Nashville suburb of Madison. This area contains several hundred acres and is some of the most rural land remaining in Davidson County, Tennessee, especially toward its southern end, with several large farms including a major equestrian operation. At the southernmost point is a boat ramp onto the Cumberland, which is the major current feature of Peeler Park, a property of the Metropolitan Nashville Department of Parks and Recreation that is as of 2006 still largely undeveloped. Peeler Park contains a model airplane landing strip and a new greenway. The northern end includes a middle school and an elementary school. The land within the bend is mostly visible from neighborhoods across the river (and atop river bluffs) in Donelson and East Nashville. The area's lack of development is largely due to its lack of accessibility; there is no ferry or bridge across the Cumberland from Neely's Bend into Nashville proper and access to the southern end is only by a narrow two-lane road.
