= Newell Houston Ensley =

American minister, activist, and professor

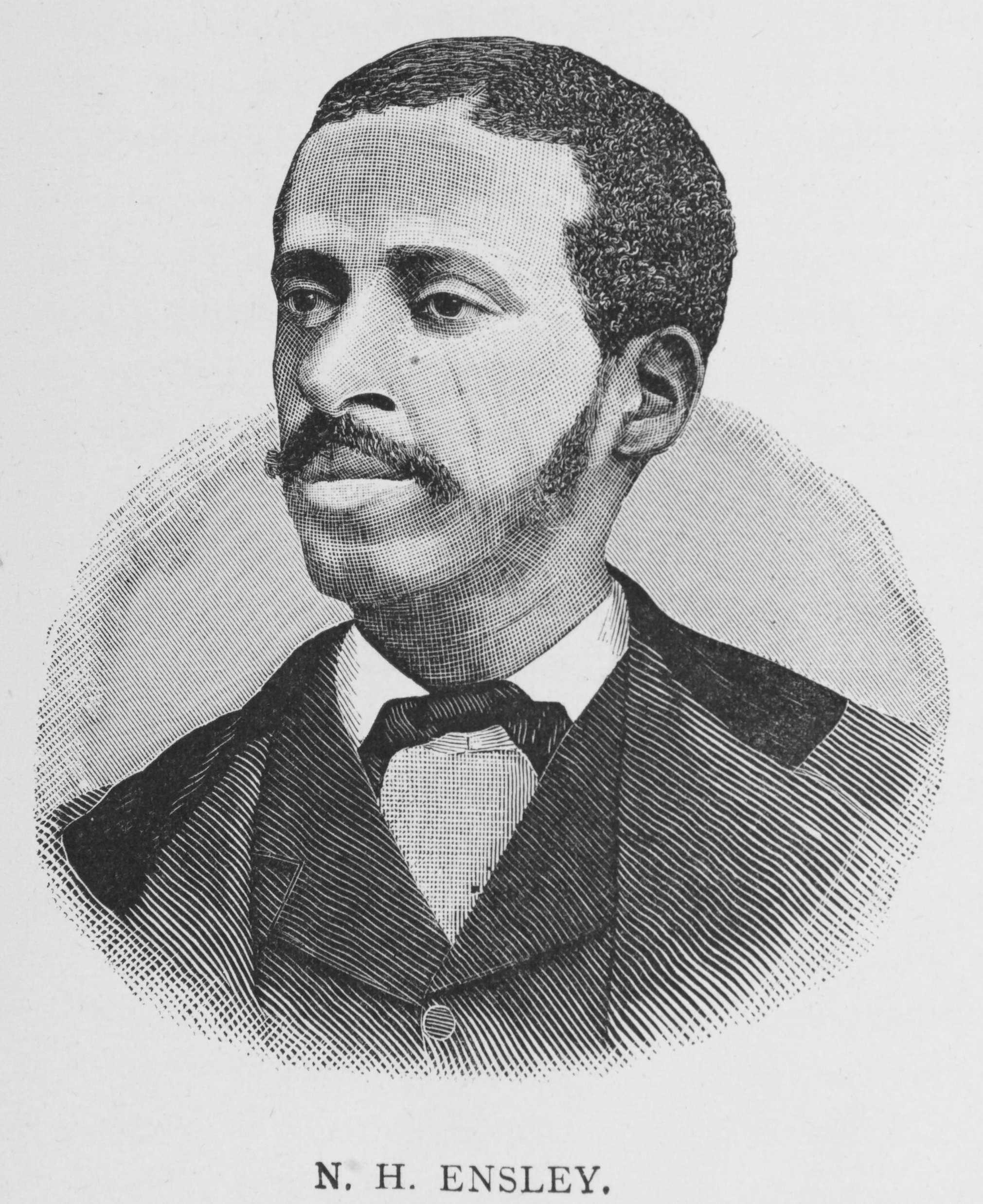
- Ensley in 1887
- Born: August 23, 1852; Nashville, Tennessee, U.S.
- Died: May 23, 1888 (aged 35); Denver, Colorado
- Occupations: Professor, musician
- Spouse: Elizabeth Piper Ensley (m. 1882)
- Children: 3

Newell Houston Ensley (August 23, 1852 – May 23, 1888) was an American Baptist minister and civil rights activist. He was a professor at Shaw University, Howard University, and Alcorn University.

== Early life ==
Newell Houston Ensley was born a slave in Nashville, Tennessee on August 23, 1852 to George and Clara Ensley. His family was owned by his mother's father and Ensley was allowed to play with the white children on the farm and was taught to read and write. Both of his parents were also literate. He was a buggy boy, servant, and rent collector to his grandfather. While still a child during the American Civil War (1861–1865), Ensley ran away and hid in Union Army camps that were nearby until the Army moved on and he returned to the farm where he received a whipping. In spite of this, Ensley remained on the farm after the war was over and the abolition of slavery.

After the Civil War, he was a paid worker for his grandfather, until the grandfather's death in 1866. His mother was established in a cabin on 30 acres in that year. Ensley's father died some time earlier, and his step-father did not wish him to attend school. In spite of this, he did attend lessons; one of his teachers was Benjamin Holmes, who later was a member of the Fisk Jubilee Singers.

Newell worked and attended a school near his mother's cabin and became a schoolteacher and Sunday school teacher, desiring to become a preacher.

When Holmes left the school to join the Jubilee Singers on their first tour in 1871, Ensley was appointed in his stead. On top of his teaching duties, Ensley taught the Sunday school. He was also baptized and became a deacon. In February 1871, he entered Roger Williams University where he studied under Daniel W. Phillips. About this time he was licensed to preach. He also became known for his singing. In June 1878, he graduated third in his class and entered Newton Theological Seminary in Newton Center, Massachusetts. He graduated three years later as the only black person in a class of seven. He toured the north with Dr. Phillips, representing the Home Mission schools.

During his studies at Roger Williams, he attended the six-year classical course Nashville Baptist Institute, receiving a diploma in May 1877.

== Career ==
After graduating from Newton, Ensley took a position of professor of theology and Latin at Shaw University in Raleigh, North Carolina.

One year later, he moved to Howard University in Washington, DC, serving as a professor of rhetoric, Hebrew, and science. About this time he married. He then moved to Alcorn University in Lorman, Mississippi where he held the title of professor of rhetoric, natural sciences, and vocal music from 1882 until his death in 1888. He was a scholar of Greek, and a noted orator and poet.

Among his favorite lecture topics were "Toussaint L'Ouverture," "Pluck versus Luck," "The Rights of Women," "Temperance," and "The Rights of the Negro."

=== Civil Rights ===
Later in his life, Ensley frequently traveled to give talks about African-American issues. In June 1883, he was in Chicago for a Baptist Minister Conference at the Grand Pacific Hotel. Reverend E. O. Taylor and a group of ministers including Ensley went to Race Brothers' oyster house. The restaurant had a rule against serving black people, and Ensley was thrown out in an affair which received national coverage. In 1886, he traveled to St. Louis for the First National Convention of Colored Baptists. At that meeting, he spoke out against the poor behavior of certain leaders of the Colored Conventions Movement

== Personal life and death ==
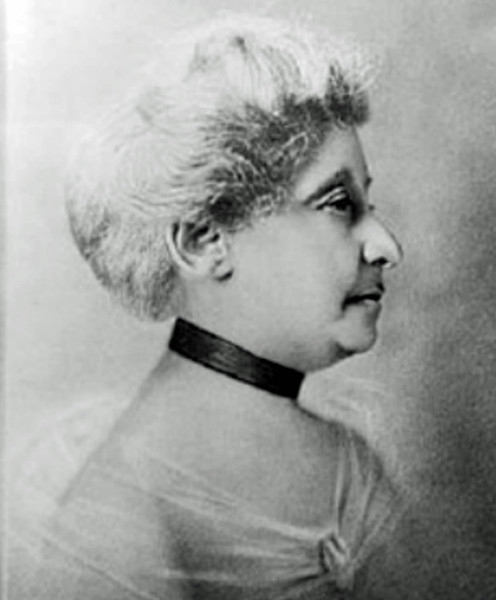
Elizabeth Piper Ensley was an educator, suffragette, journalist and activist

Ensley married Elizabeth Piper Ensley on September 4, 1882, in Boston. They had three children: Roger (b. 1883), Charlotte (b. 1885), and Jean (March 1888–June 1888).

In 1887, Ensley was in ill health and was travelling and speaking throughout the country. He died in Denver, Colorado on May 23, 1888.
