= Ensley Llewellyn =

American military officer (1905–1989)

Ensley M. Llewellyn (1905–1989) was a United States military officer credited for reestablishing Stars and Stripes when it resumed publication in 1942, following a hiatus after World War I. He later served as adjutant general of the Washington National Guard.
