= 167th Infantry Regiment (United States) =

The 167th Infantry Regiment (nicknamed "4th Alabama") is an infantry regiment of the Alabama National Guard.

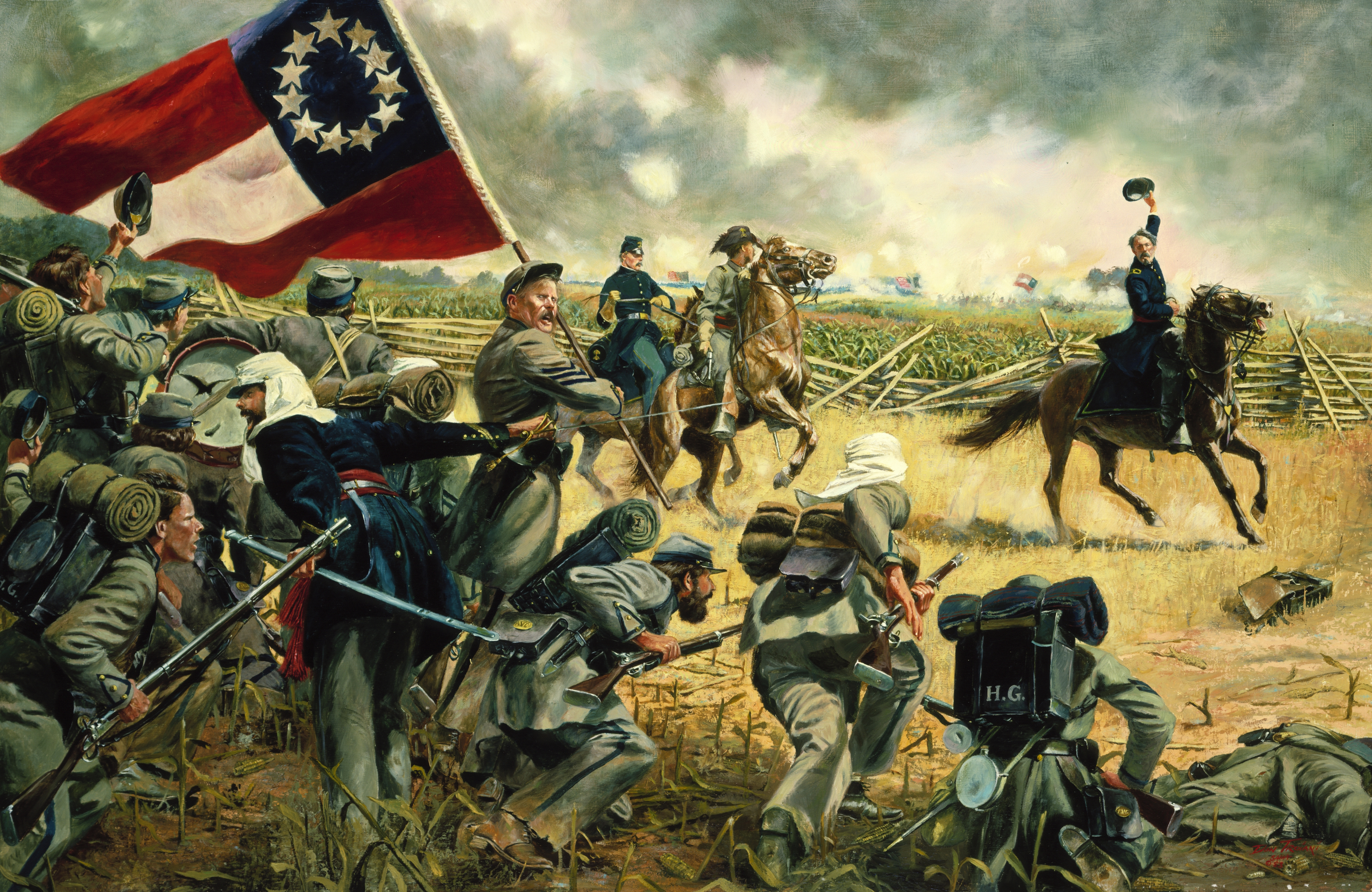
General Barnard Elliott Bee Jr. leads the 4th Alabama against Matthew's Hill.

== History ==
The 167th Infantry Regiment traces its lineage to 1836, when it was organized as the Regiment of Alabama Militia. During the early nineteenth century, it served primarily as state troops but was called into federal service during the Seminole Wars and the Mexican–American War. After the war, it continued service as independent companies.

167th Infantry Regiment
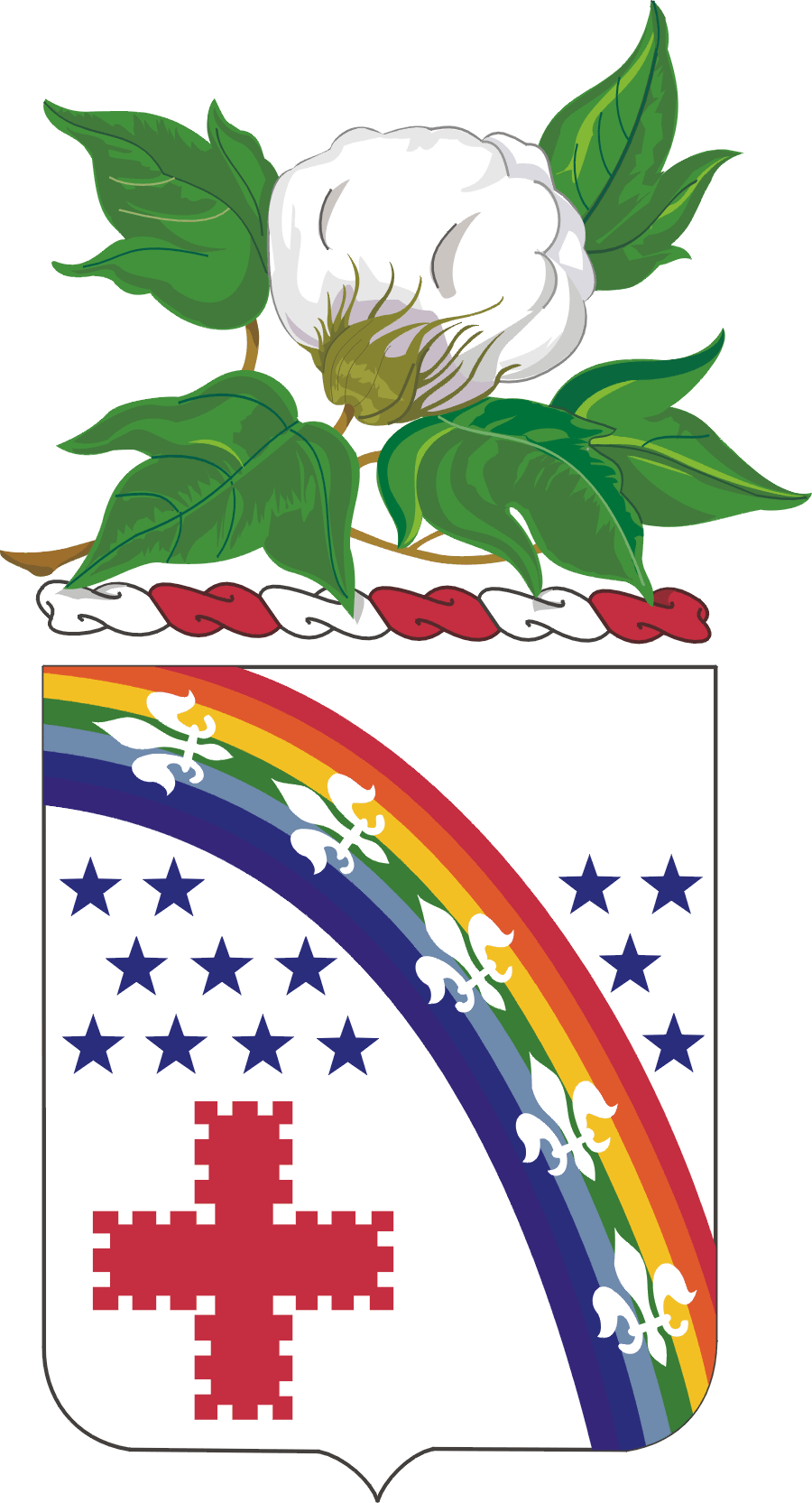
- Coat of arms
- Active: 1836-present
- Country: United States
- Allegiance: Alabama
- Branch: United States Army
- Type: Light Infantry
- Size: Battalion
- Part of: Alabama Army National Guard
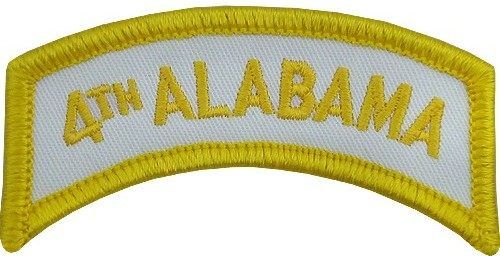
- Nickname: "4th Alabama" (special designation)
- Motto: SIGNA INFEREMUS (We Shall Drive Forward)
- Engagements: Seminole Wars; Mexican–American War; American Civil War; World War I; World War II; Western New Guinea campaign; Maffin Bay; Battle of Morotai; Philippines campaign (1944–1945); Battle of Mindanao; Operation Iraqi Freedom; Operation Enduring Freedom

Insignia
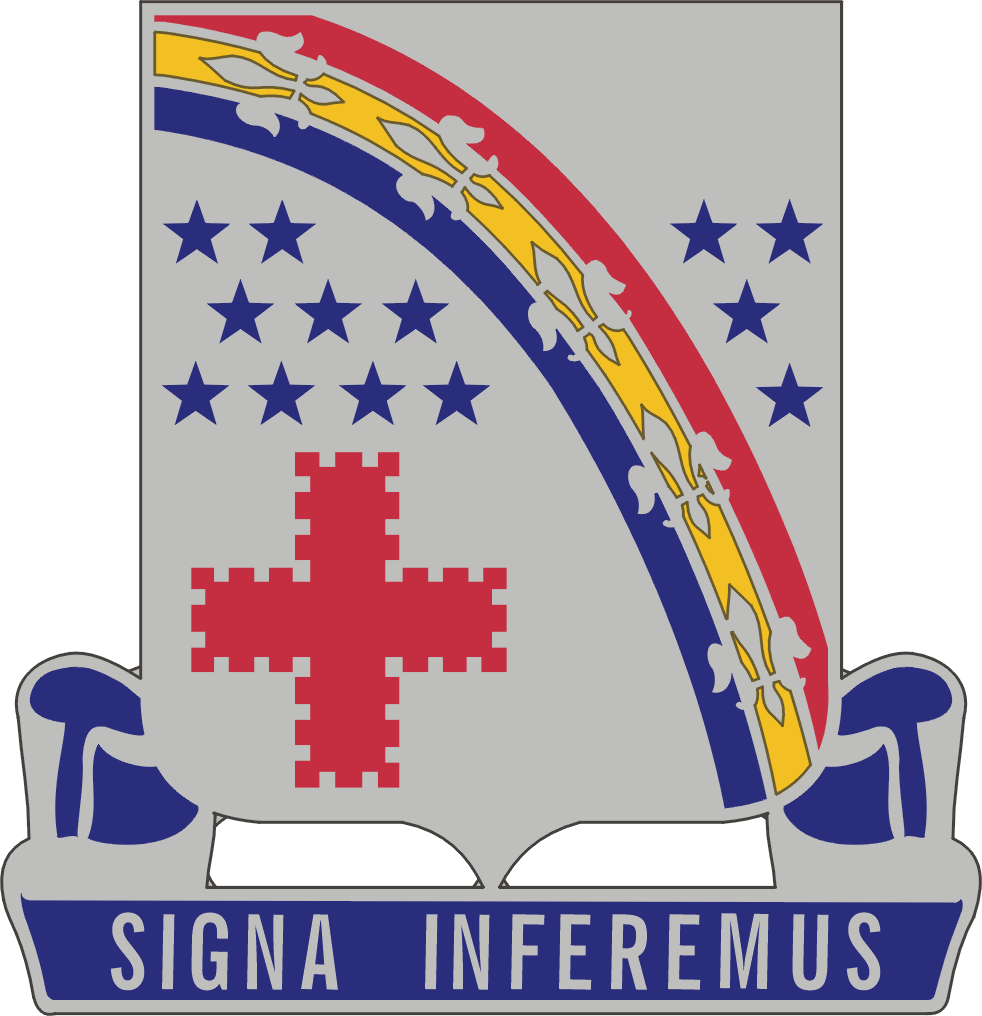
- Distinctive unit insignia

=== American Civil War ===
During the American Civil War, it mustered on the side of the Confederacy in May 1861 as the 4th Regiment at Dalton, Georgia and fought as part of the Alabama Brigade in the Second Battle of Bull Run, the Battle of Antietam, Gettysburg, Chickamauga, the Wilderness, and Spotsylvania Court House. The unit surrendered in Appomattox on April 12, 1865, with 202 men. A total of 1,422 men had served with it over the course of the war. Approximately 240 died in battle and 100 of disease.

=== Postbellum ===
On 30 September 1875, the 1st Infantry Regiment was reorganized in central and southern Alabama from independent companies of the Alabama Volunteer Militia at Montgomery, Selma, Greenville, Conecuh, Troy, Union Springs, Eufaula, Birmingham, Opelika, Gainesville, and Tuskegee. It was redesignated the 2nd Infantry Regiment on 25 November 1875, with companies in the southern part of the state having been transferred to the 1st Infantry Regiment on 29 September 1875. The Alabama Volunteer Militia was redesignated the Alabama State Troops on 9 February 1877. The 2nd Infantry Regiment was expanded and reorganized in 1887-1888 with units in the central and northwest parts of the state, with the 3rd Infantry Regiment encompassing companies in the central and northeastern parts of the state. The Alabama State Troops were redesignated the Alabama National Guard on 18 February 1897.

The 3rd Infantry Regiment was mustered into federal service for the Spanish-American War from 9-24 May 1898 as the 1st Alabama Volunteer Infantry, and was mustered out 31 October 1898 at Birmingham. In 1898-1899, the regiment was reorganized in the central and northern parts of the state as the 3rd Infantry, and was redesignated the 4th Infantry Regiment on 15 July 1911.

=== Mexican Border and World War I ===
In 1916, the unit was stationed along the Mexican border to guard against Pancho Villa's bandits. Its efforts were not entirely effective, but the experience conditioned the troops for future combat in World War I. In preparation for the upcoming war, the 4th Alabama was recalled to Montgomery and assigned guard duties at various strategic sites.

On August 15, 1917, the 4th Alabama was federalized as the 167th Infantry Regiment and joined other similar units to form the 42nd "Rainbow" Division. The 167th embarked for Liverpool, England and from there moved to Le Havre, France to fight in World War I. By February 1918, it had completed most of its trainings and began entering the front lines. They were given a unique regimental flag that contain a blue field with a golden eagle and the name of the regiment in gold, it was made in Alabama.

During the following nine months, the unit participated in five major operations. It helped turn back a last-ditch German offensive during the Second Battle of the Marne and push back German forces near the town of Chateau-Thierry. Its fiercest fighting occurred in July 1918 during the Battle of Soissons against German strong points at the Croix Blanche and Croix Rouge farms in Aisne. The regiment forced a German retreat and secured a crossing over the river Ourcq, which helped Allied troops dislodge entrenched Germans from their positions in France. Due to poor planning and coordination, the victory came at a heavy cost for the 167th, which lost over 160 men. The commander of the supporting 168th Infantry and the commander of 84th Brigade, higher HQ of the 167th, were both relieved of their duty. Soldiers of the 167th were subsequently recognized for their actions and service, and a memorial to the 42nd Division was established there in 2011–12.

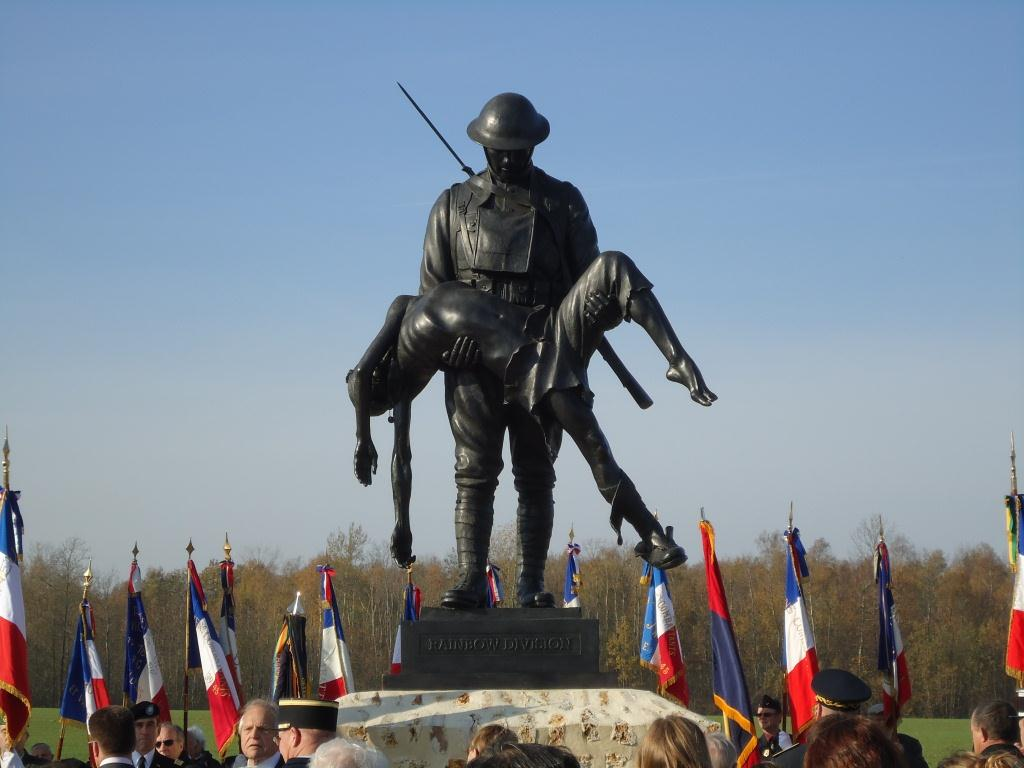
World War I Memorial at La Croix Rouge Farm, France honoring the 42nd Division.

=== Inter-war period ===
The 167th was part of the occupying force after the war ended. The regiment arrived at the port of New York on 25 April 1919 on the USS North Carolina and was demobilized on 19 May 1919 at Camp Shelby, Mississippi. The 167th Infantry was reconstituted in the National Guard in 1921 pursuant to the National Defense Act of 1920 and was allotted to the state of Alabama. It was concurrently relieved from the 42nd Division and assigned to the 39th Division. It was reorganized on 16 December 1921 by redesignation of the 4th Infantry, Alabama National Guard (organized 1 July 1919). The regimental headquarters was organized on 10 April 1922 and federally recognized at Montgomery, Alabama. The regiment was relieved from the 39th Division on 1 July 1923 and assigned to the 31st Division. The regimental headquarters was successively relocated to Birmingham, Alabama, September 1929, and to Gadsden, Alabama, 11 January 1932.

The regiment, or elements thereof, was called up to perform the following state duties: 3rd Battalion performed riot control during a railroad workers’ strike at Birmingham, 4 August 1922 – 4 January 1923; performed border guard duty along the Florida state line in connection with the Mediterranean fruit fly quarantine, April–July 1929; 3rd Battalion performed riot duty in connection with criminal trials at Eufaula, Alabama, July 1929, and Montgomery, February–March 1930; Company C performed a man-hunt and captured bank robbers in Dallas County, Alabama, in December 1930; 2nd Battalion performed escort duty for the defendants of the Scottsboro trials in Scottsboro, Alabama, 5–9 April 1931; 3rd Battalion performed escort duty in connection with protecting black prisoners against race riots in Birmingham, 2–4 October 1931; 2nd Battalion performed tornado relief at Northport, Alabama, 21–23 March 1932; several companies performed riot control during a workers’ strike at cotton mills in Anniston, Alabama, in May 1933; 1st Battalion performed escort duty in connection with protecting black prisoners in Tuscaloosa, Alabama, July–August 1933. The regiment conducted annual summer training most years at Camp McClellan, Alabama, 1921–39.

=== World War II ===
The 167th Regiment was assigned to the 31st "Dixie" Division during World War II and fought in the western Pacific, notably in New Guinea and the Philippines. It participated in the battles for Morotai and Mindanao. For its service, the unit received the Philippine Republic Presidential Unit Citation. It remained in the theater until the end of the war in 1945. It was reorganized on 2 December 1946, with headquarters federally recognized at Birmingham.

=== 1960s ===
During the civil rights movement, the federal government activated the 167th as a National Guard unit, twice in 1963 and once in 1965, to protect demonstrators such as the Freedom Riders.

=== 21st century ===
==== Iraq ====
The 167th served in Iraq during the Second Gulf War from 2001 to 2002, in 2005, and from 2007 to 2008.

When the 1-167th Infantry Battalion deployed to Iraq in 2005, Company A was officially selected for mobilization, but additional men were drawn from Company B and C. The infantrymen's mission was focused on finding and fixing insurgents. They also provided security for the population as a whole, particularly during the 2005 Iraqi elections.

When the 1-167th Infantry Battalion deployed to Iraq in 2007, Company C was mobilized. The unit provided security escorts from the Kuwaiti border crossing throughout Iraq to all Forward Operating Bases (FOBs), including those of other countries, such as the South Korean FOB near the border with Turkey.

The largest of all 1144th Joint Logistics Task Force elements, the 4th Alabama brought 196 members to Operation Iraqi Freedom, out of the 210 members that had been activated.

==== Afghanistan ====
In 2012, about 600 members of the 1-167th Infantry Battalion deployed to Afghanistan to conduct security force missions in support of NATO Training Mission - Afghanistan (NTM-A), providing freedom of maneuver for NTM-A and regional support command assets.

=== Commands and commanders ===
- William P. Screws, during the Mexican Border War and World War I
- Col. Laroy S. Graham, May 16, 1945 -

The 1-167th Infantry has been under many different higher commands, including the 31st Infantry Division, the 35th Infantry Division, the 149th Armor Brigade, the 226th Maneuver Enhancement Brigade, the 31st Separate Armored Brigade, the 48th Brigade Combat Team, and the 142nd Battlefield Surveillance Brigade. The 1-167th Infantry is the 3rd maneuver battalion assigned to the 53rd Infantry Brigade Combat Team.

== Current status ==
In 2008, the 167th was consolidated with the 31st Cavalry Regiment.

In 2017, the state of Alabama dedicated a monument at the Union Station in Montgomery. The statue honors 167th's service as part of the 42nd "Rainbow" Division during World War I and was created by James Butler, the same sculptor who had made a similar sculpture for the Croix Rouge Farm memorial in France in 2011–12.

The unit has been headquartered at Talladega, Alabama with companies in Tuscaloosa, Pelham, Cullman, Calera, and Oxford.

== Symbols ==
=== Insignia and coat of arms ===
The five fleurs-de-lis on the unit's coat of arms symbolize the five major operations it participated in during World War I. Its engagement at La Croix Rouge Farm is represented by the embattled red cross. The coat of arms was approved in 1923. In 1971, thirteen stars were added to symbolize the battles the unit fought during the Civil War. The insignia was approved that same year.

=== The 4th Alabama tab ===
The tab was created to honor the 1-167th's Civil War history as the 4th Alabama Regiment. This lineage has been officially acknowledged by the United States Department of the Army's Center of Military History with the "4th Alabama" special designation.

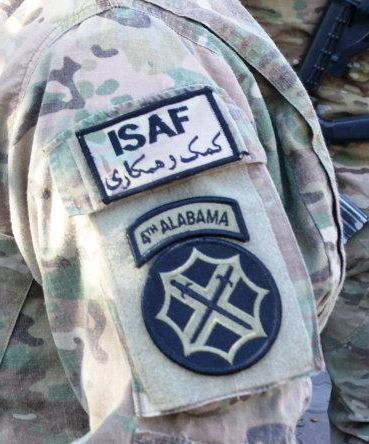
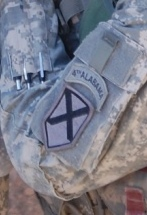

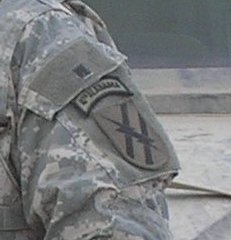
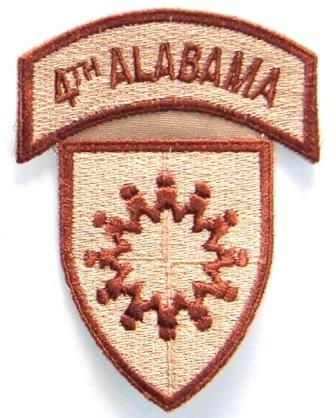

== Honors and awards ==
=== Campaign credits ===
Indian Wars

- Seminoles

Mexican War

- Streamer without inscription

Civil War (Confederate service)

- Bull Run
- Peninsula
- Manassas
- Antietam
- Fredericksburg
- Chancellorsville
- Gettysburg
- Chickamauga
- Wilderness
- Spotsylvania
- Cold Harbor
- Petersburg
- Appomattox

World War I

- Champagne-Marne
- Aisne-Marne
- Lorraine
- Champagne
- St. Mihiel
- Meuse-Argonne

World War II

- New Guinea (with arrowhead device)
- Western Pacific (with arrowhead device)
- Southern Philippines

=== Awards ===
- Philippine Presidential Unit Citation with streamer embroidered 17 OCTOBER 1944 to 4 July 1945 (Department of the Army General Orders No. 47, 1950)

== Notable former members ==
- Joe Starnes, World War I, U.S. Representative (1935–45) from Alabama
- Robert T. Coles, Civil War, Author of “From Huntsville to Appomattox: R. T. Cole's History of 4th Regiment, Alabama Volunteer Infantry, C. S. A., Army of Northern Virginia.”

== See also ==
- The Alabama Brigade (American Civil War)
- 31st Infantry Division
