= 31st Infantry Division (United States) =

Inactive US Army National Guard formation

31st Chemical Brigade
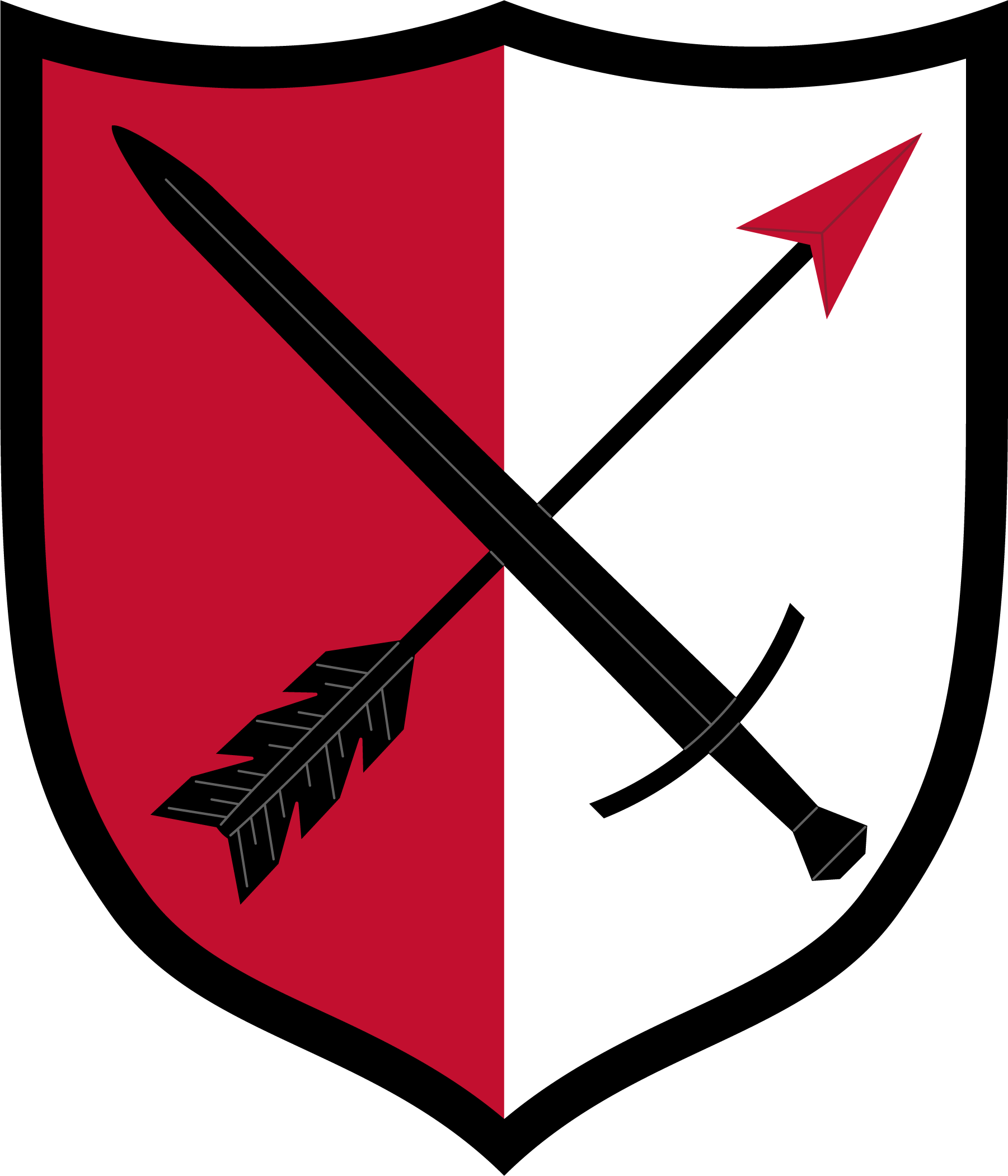
- 31st Chemical Brigade SSI
- Active: 1 November 1973–30 September 2002 (31st Armored Brigade); 30 September 2002 –present (31st Chemical Brigade)
- Country: United States
- Branch: United States Army National Guard
- Type: Chemical
- Size: Brigade
- Part of: Alabama Army National Guard
- Garrison/HQ: 10300 Hwy 69 S, Tuscaloosa, AL
- Nickname: "Dragon Brigade"

Insignia
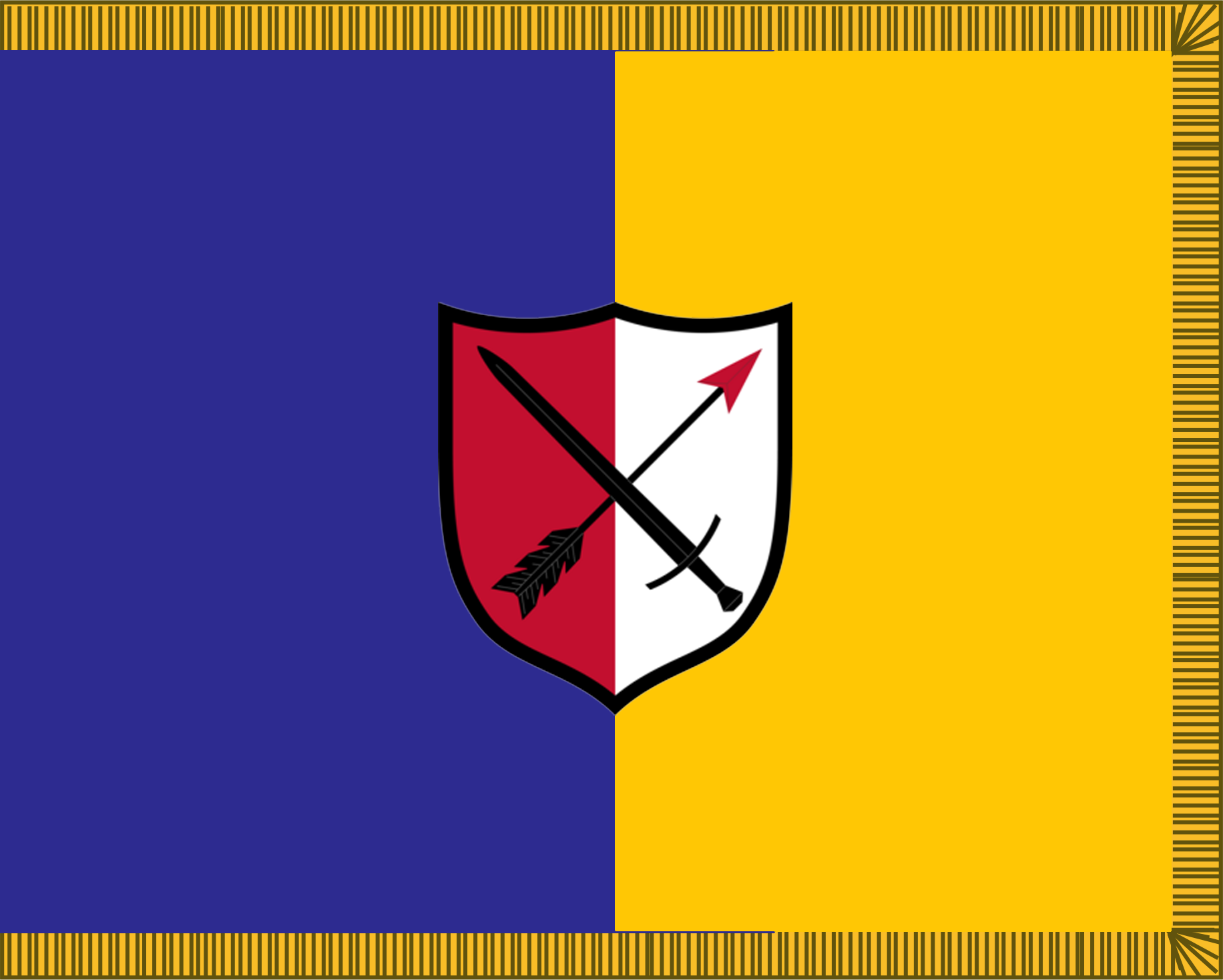
- 31st Chemical Brigade Flag (2024-present)

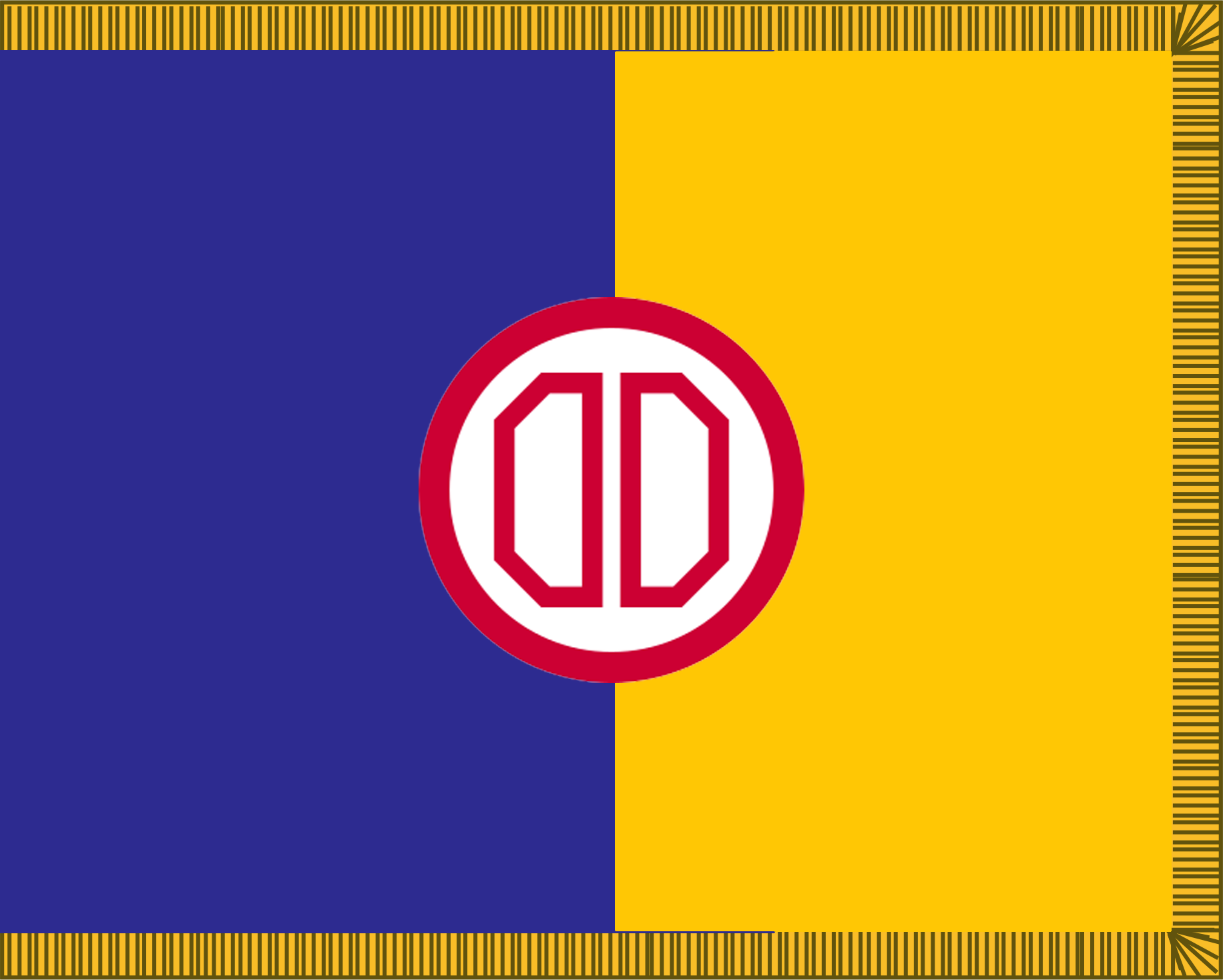
- 31st Chemical Brigade Flag 2002-2024

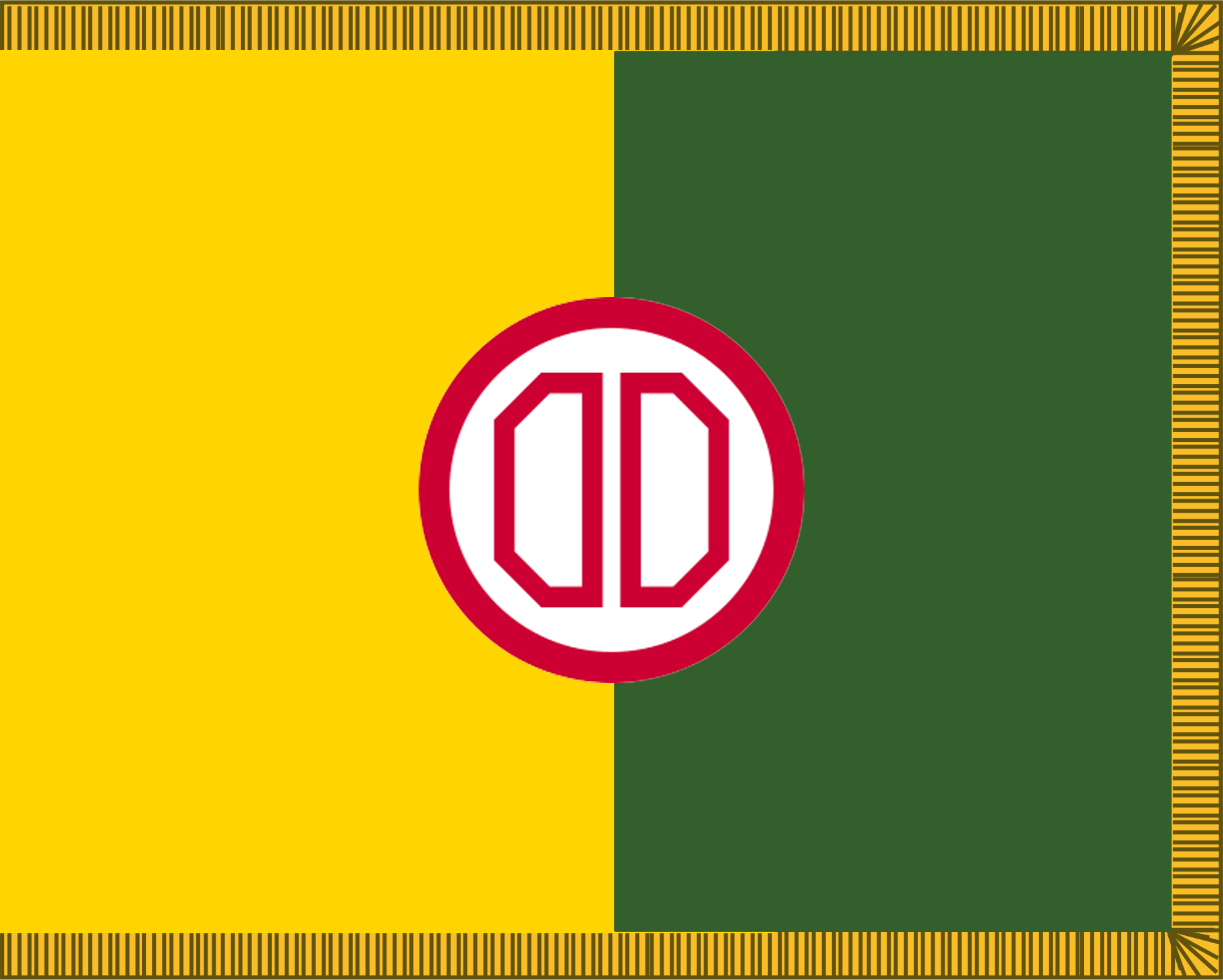
- 31st Armored Brigade flag

The 31st Chemical Brigade is an Army National Guard CBRN brigade. The brigade was reduced in size from a division in 1973 when it became the headquarters of the 31st Armored Brigade. The brigade traces its lineage back to the 31st Infantry Division ("Dixie"), active almost continuously from 1917 to 1968. It was made up of Alabama, Florida, Georgia, Louisiana, Michigan, Illinois, and Mississippi personnel at various points in its existence. The division saw battle in both World War I and World War II. It was mobilized during the Korean War but not sent overseas.

Organized in 1917 during World War I from the national guardsmen of Alabama, Florida, and Georgia, the division deployed to France in September 1918, arriving weeks before the Armistice of 11 November that ended the war. In France, it was reduced to a cadre and most of its troops used to provide replacements for units already in France. It returned to the United States in December and was demobilized in January 1919.

The 31st was reorganized in 1923 with national guardsmen from Alabama, Florida, Louisiana, and Mississippi. It was mobilized in 1940 during World War II, and spent several years training in the United States. In 1944 it was sent to the South-West Pacific Area, fighting in the New Guinea campaign and in the Battle of Mindanao. After the end of the war the division was demobilized in December 1945.

In 1946, the 31st was reactivated with Alabama and Mississippi units. Mobilized during the Korean War, the division served stateside at Camp Atterbury and Camp Carson. The 31st was demobilized in 1954 and reorganized in Alabama and Mississippi. During the height of the Civil rights movement, Mississippi elements of the division were called up to restore order during the Ole Miss riot of 1962, while Alabama elements were Federalized to ensure school integration during 1963 and to keep order during the Selma to Montgomery marches of 1965. In 1968 the division was eliminated, with its units becoming part of the 30th Armored Division.

== History ==
=== World War I ===
31st Infantry Division
- 31st Infantry Division SSI
- Active: 18 July 1917–14 January 1919 (31st Division); 15 October 1924–21 December 1945 (31st Infantry Division); 1 November 1946–15 January 1968 (31st Infantry Division); 15 January 1968–1 November 1973 (31st Brigade, 30th Armored Div.)
- Country: United States
- Allegiance: Alabama
- Branch: US Army National Guard
- Type: Infantry
- Size: Division
- Nickname: "Dixie Division"
- Motto: It shall be done
- Engagements: World War I; World War II; New Guinea (with arrowhead); Southern Philippines; Western Pacific

Commanders
- Notable commanders: Albert H. Blanding; John C. Persons; Clarence A. Martin

Insignia
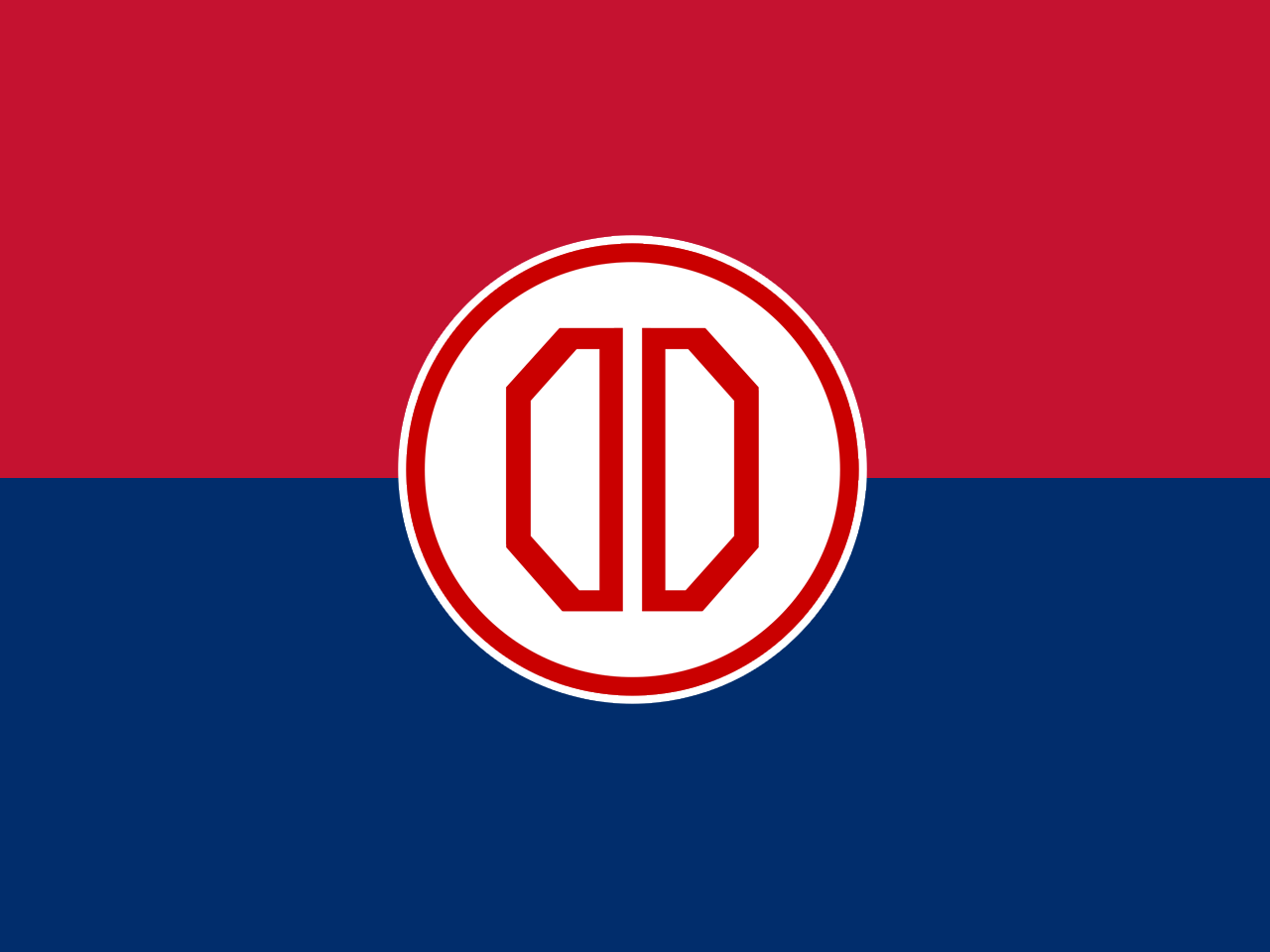
- Flag of the United States Army 31st Infantry Division

==== Organization and training ====
According to the 5 May 1917 organization plan of National Guard divisions, selected units from Alabama, Florida, and Georgia were to form the 10th Division, though it was not organized at the time. On 18 July, the War Department designated National Guard troops of these three states to form the 31st Division. For training, the division was directed to concentrate at Camp Wheeler, Georgia, on 3 August; the Alabama, Florida, and Georgia National Guards were drafted into federal service two days later. However, the units that were to form the 31st did not begin concentration until 25 August, when Major General Francis Joseph Kernan took command. Kernan was replaced by 56th Field Artillery Brigade commander Brigadier General John Louis Hayden, the senior brigade commander, on 18 September.

The division included the 61st and 62nd Infantry Brigades and the 56th Field Artillery Brigade by the end of the concentration period. The 61st included the 5th Georgia Infantry, separate Georgia infantry companies, and detachments of the 1st and 2nd Georgia and 1st Florida Regiments of Infantry; the 62nd included the 1st Alabama and 2nd Florida Infantry, and detachments of the 1st Florida and 1st Georgia Regiments of Infantry and of the 1st Alabama Cavalry; the 56th included detachments of the Georgia Field Artillery, the 1st Florida, 1st Georgia, and 2nd Alabama Regiments of Infantry, and of the 1st Alabama Cavalry.

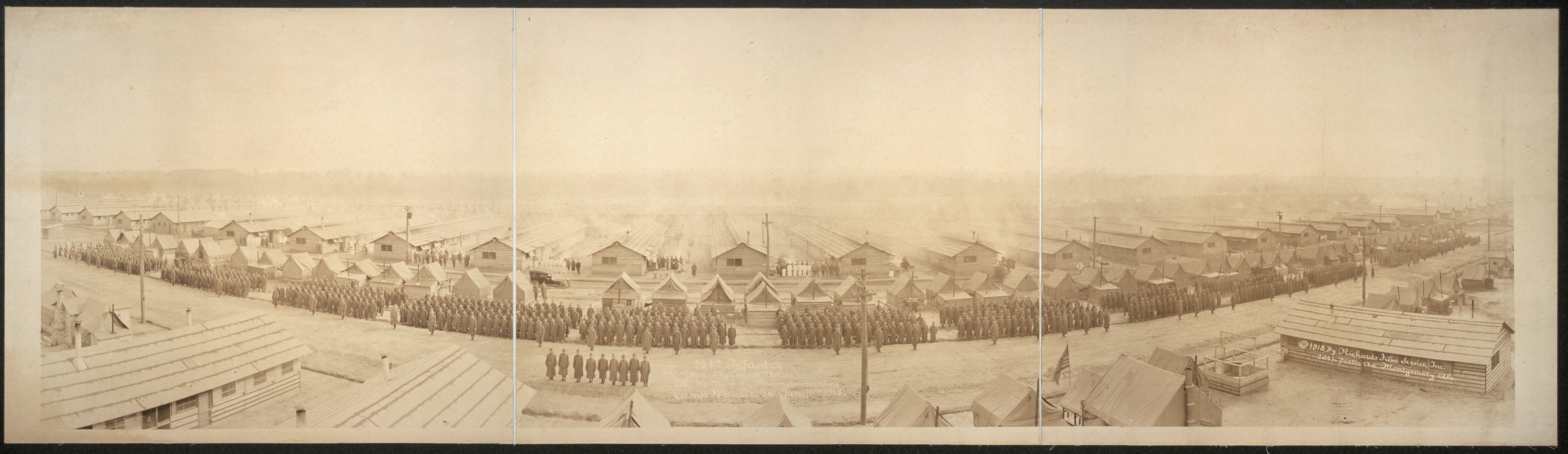
Panoramic photograph of the 124th Infantry at Camp Wheeler, January 1918

On 1 September, the 31st was reorganized in accordance with the tables of organization of 8 August, which called for a square division with four infantry regiments. As a result, the 61st Brigade included the 121st and 122nd Infantry with the 117th Machine Gun Battalion, the 62nd included the 123rd and 124th Infantry with the 118th Machine Gun Battalion, and the 56th included the 116th, 117th, and 118th Field Artillery Regiments with the 106th Trench Mortar Battery. During October, the division was reinforced with 10,000 Selective Service draftees from Alabama, Florida, and Georgia, transferred from Camp Gordon, Georgia, Camp Jackson, South Carolina, and Camp Pike, Arkansas, as it began systematic training on 22 October. On 15 March 1918, Major General Francis H. French became division commander; he was replaced by Major General LeRoy Springs Lyon two months later.

A film showing activities of the division at Camp Wheeler, February 1918

However, from November 1917 to June 1918, the 31st transferred or otherwise lost almost all of its infantry privates and about half of its artillery privates, including 4,300 who were sent to Camp Merritt, New Jersey, in June for shipment overseas as replacements. In June, 9,200 men from Michigan and Illinois were transferred to the division, followed by 5,700 more from Illinois in July. By 21 July, the division fielded 24,000 men, with its officers mostly from the Organized Reserve Corps and the National Army. The 56th Field Artillery Brigade left to train at Camp Jackson on 24 July, while the 2nd Battalion, 122nd Infantry relocated to Camp Greene, North Carolina, on 20 August. During the latter month, 2,000 men, including 1,200 from Camp Travis, Texas, joined the 31st. On 28 September, the 61st Infantry Brigade commander, Brigadier General Walter Alexander Harris, took command of the division, leading it until 14 November.

==== Overseas deployment and demobilization ====
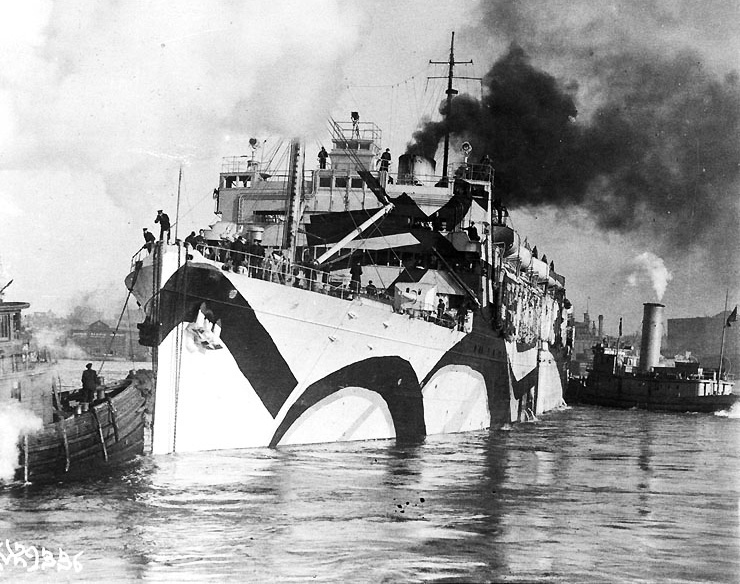
The USS Orizaba departing from New York in 1918

The division began its overseas movement in September, relocating via Camp Mills to the Brooklyn, Hoboken, and New York Ports of Embarkation. The 106th Engineers and Train were the first to depart from New York on 16 September, arriving in Scotland on 29 September. On the latter date, the Advance Detachment of the division sailed from Hoboken, arriving at Brest on 7 October. The division headquarters (aboard the USS Orizaba), most of the infantry, the 106th Field Signal Battalion, and the 106th Train Headquarters and Military Police sailed between 30 September and 11 October. They landed at Brest between 13 and 21 October, except for the 117th and 118th Machine Gun Battalions and the 106th Train Headquarters and Military Police, which arrived in England on 17 October. The 56th Field Artillery Brigade sailed with the remaining infantry and trains between 14 and 28 October, and landed at Brest between 25 October and 9 November, except for the 124th Infantry, which landed in England on 24 October. The troops in England spent a brief period in rest camps, then moved to Brest through Cherbourg and Le Havre.

For duty with the Services of Supply, the 106th Engineers, without Train, relocated from Le Havre to Brest on 4 October. Once in France, the 31st was planned to become the seventh depot division, a cadre formation responsible for processing replacements and forwarding them to frontline units. As six depot divisions were already operating, the American Expeditionary Forces' Chief of Staff did not believe that a seventh depot division was necessary, and on 17 October the 31st Division was instead ordered skeletonized. Two days later, the division headquarters, both infantry brigades, the 116th Machine Gun Battalion, 106th Supply Train, and 106th Train Headquarters and Military Police moved to Le Mans, with some units relocating through the Loches area, while the remaining units were detached from the division when they arrived at Brest. On 29 October, the division was ordered to be further reduced to a record cadre numbering 10 officers and 102 men, although the 56th Field Artillery Brigade was detached to Camp Coëtquidan for training. The 106th Trench Mortar Battery of the brigade relocated to Vitrey on 4 November, preceded by the 106th Field Signal Battalion, which left for the Signal Corps Replacement Depot at Cour-Cheverny on 30 October.

The division headquarters, both infantry brigades, the 116th Machine Gun Battalion, and 106th Train Headquarters and Military Police were skeletonized early in November. Most of the personnel were transferred to the 2nd Depot Division for processing and reassignment as replacements. The 106th Sanitary Train, which had remained at Brest, relocated to Camp de Souge on 25 November, and thence to the American Embarkation Center at Le Mans in December, where it was skeletonized. On 27 November, the record cadre and 56th Field Artillery Brigade (without the 106th Trench Mortar Battery) moved to Brest, from which they sailed aboard the USS Manchuria between 9 and 10 December. After arriving at Camp Merritt on 20 December, they moved to Camp Gordon on 1 January 1919, where the record cadre and 56th Brigade demobilized on 14 January.

Elements of the division remained in France for several months longer, however. The 106th Supply Train relocated to Camp de Souge on 29 November. The 106th Trench Mortar Battery and part of the 106th Sanitary Train sailed on 2 and 15 January, respectively. The 106th Field Signal Battalion departed Bordeaux on 18 April, and the last units of the division overseas, the 106th Engineers and 106th Supply Train, returned to the United States on 5 July.

=== Interwar period ===
Under the National Defense Act of 1920, the 39th Division was allotted to Alabama, Arkansas, Florida, Louisiana, and Mississippi, part of IV Corps, in 1921. On 1 July 1923 it was reorganized, less the Arkansas units, and renamed the 31st Division, following the recommendations of a joint board of Regular and Guard officers, due to its allocation to states which raised the 31st Division in World War I. In August 1924, the division, except for the 124th Infantry, conducted squad and platoon level training at Camp McClellan, its designated mobilization training center, due to its troops being relatively inexperienced. Its headquarters was organized and Federally recognized on 15 October of that year, stationed at St. Augustine, Florida, under the command of Major General Albert H. Blanding of Florida. During the interwar period, the division was organized in accordance with a square organization similar to its World War I structure, although medical and quartermaster regiments and a separate headquarters for special troops (the division headquarters, ordnance, signal, and light tank companies) were added and the division artillery initially lacked a 155 mm howitzer regiment.

The 141st Field Artillery (75 mm) was initially assigned to the states of Louisiana and Alabama, but was reorganized in 1926 when the Louisiana elements were reorganized as the 167th Separate Battalion, Field Artillery (Horse) and assigned to the 23rd Cavalry Division. The regiment, by this time an all-Alabama unit, was redesignated the 117th Field Artillery in 1927, taking the designation of a partially Alabama-organized unit that had served with the 31st Division in World War I. In 1932-1933, the 114th Field Artillery (155 mm howitzer) was organized in Mississippi and assigned to the division.

During the interwar period, the division did not train together in most years, as separate summer camps were held for the units of each state. Florida units trained at Camp J. Clifford R. Foster, Alabama units at Camp McClellan, Mississippi units at Camp Shelby, and Louisiana and sometimes Mississippi units at Camp Beauregard. The division staff, which included men from all four states, conducted joint summer training at Camp McClellan between 1924 and 1926 and 1929 and 1931, Camp Beauregard in 1927, Camp Foster in 1928, and Fort Oglethorpe, Georgia, in addition to participation in multiple corps area and army command post exercises, including the September 1936 Third Army command post exercise at San Antonio. On 4 March 1933, the divisional headquarters was relocated to Bartow, Florida.

Elements of the 31st were called up for state duty several times during the interwar period. Its Louisiana and Mississippi units were called up to provide emergency relief due to the Great Mississippi Flood of 1927. Florida units provided relief in response to the 1926 Miami hurricane, the 1928 Okeechobee hurricane, and the 1935 Labor Day hurricane. They also helped to enforce the 1928–1930 Mediterranean fruit fly quarantine.

Blanding became Chief of the National Guard Bureau on 30 January 1936 and was temporarily replaced by Louisiana Brigadier General Louis F. Guerre during his tenure in that position, which lasted until 30 January 1940. In August 1938, the division was reunited for the Fourth Corps Area concentration of the Third Army Maneuver in the De Soto National Forest, during which it operated as part of the provisional IV Corps. Between 17 and 23 December 1939, the division staff conducted supplementary winter training at Jackson Barracks to prepare for the upcoming Louisiana Maneuvers. During the maneuvers, held in the Kisatchie National Forest during August 1940, the 31st operated as part of IV Corps against VIII Corps. On 10 November the division headquarters relocated to Birmingham; Blanding retired on 18 November and was replaced by Alabama Major General John C. Persons, who led the division for most of the next four years.

=== World War II ===
==== WWII division organization ====
===== Square division =====
On 25 November 1940, the 31st Division was inducted into federal service at home stations and then assembled at Camp Blanding in Florida, where the division arrived on 22 December and discovered that the camp was still under construction. At the time the division still retained its World War I square organization and consisted of the following units.

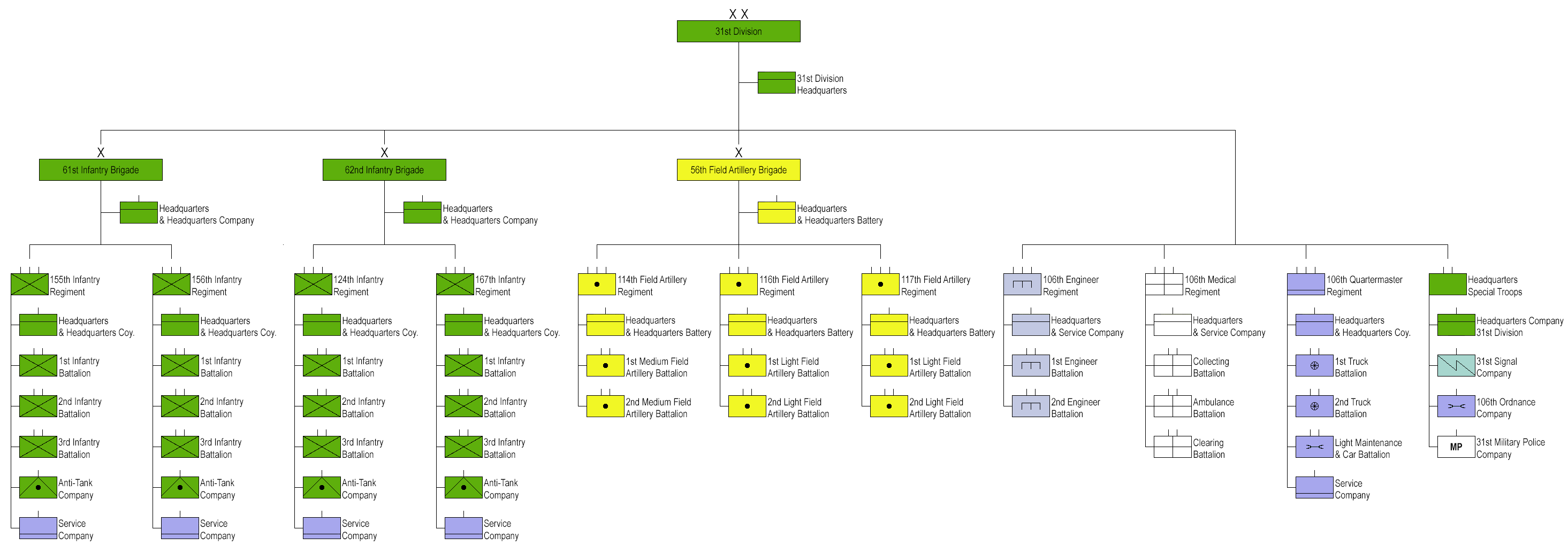
31st Division square organization (click to enlarge)

- 31st Division, in Bartow (FL)
  - 31st Division Headquarters
  - 61st Infantry Brigade, in Baton Rouge (LA)
    - Headquarters and Headquarters Company
    - 155th Infantry Regiment, in Vicksburg (MS)
      - Headquarters and Headquarters Company
      - 3× Infantry battalions
        - each battalion consists of: 1× Headquarters and Headquarters Detachment, 3× Rifle companies, 1× Weapons Company
      - Anti-Tank Company (M3 37mm Anti-Tank guns)
      - Service Company
    - 156th Infantry Regiment, in Shreveport (LA)
      - same organization as 155th Infantry Regiment
  - 62nd Infantry Brigade, Birmingham (AL)
    - Headquarters and Headquarters Company
    - 124th Infantry Regiment, in Jacksonville (FL)
      - same organization as 155th Infantry Regiment
    - 167th Infantry Regiment, in Gadsden (AL)
      - same organization as 155th Infantry Regiment
  - 56th Field Artillery Brigade, in Jacksonville (FL)
    - Headquarters and Headquarters Battery
    - 114th Field Artillery Regiment, in Greenville (MS)
      - Headquarters and Headquarters Battery
      - 2× Medium Field Artillery battalions
        - Headquarters and Headquarters Battery
        - 3× Howitzer batteries (M1918 155mm towed howitzers, replaced by M1 155mm towed howitzers in 1941)
        - Anti-Tank Battery (M1897 75mm anti-tank guns)
        - Service Battery
    - 116th Field Artillery Regiment, in Tampa (FL)
      - Headquarters and Headquarters Battery
      - 2× Light Field Artillery battalions
        - Headquarters and Headquarters Battery
        - 3× Howitzer batteries (M1897 75mm field guns), replaced by M2 105mm towed howitzers in 1941)
        - Service Battery
    - 117th Field Artillery Regiment, in Florala (AL)
      - same organization as 116th Field Artillery Regiment
  - 106th Engineer Regiment, in Jackson (MS)
    - Headquarters and Headquarters and Service Company
    - 2× Engineer battalions
      - each battalion consists of: 1× Headquarters, 3× Engineer companies
  - 106th Medical Regiment, in New Orleans (LA)
    - Headquarters and Headquarters and Service Company
    - Collecting Battalion
      - battalion consists of: 1× Headquarters, 3× Collecting companies
    - Ambulance Battalion
      - battalion consists of: 1× Headquarters, 3× Ambulance companies
    - Clearing Battalion
      - battalion consists of: 1× Headquarters, 3× Clearing companies
  - 106th Quartermaster Regiment, in St. Augustine (FL)
    - Headquarters and Headquarters Company
    - 2× Truck battalions
      - each battalion consists of: 1× Headquarters, 2× Truck companies
    - Light Maintenance and Car Battalion
      - battalion consists of: 1× Headquarters, 1× Light Maintenance Company, 1× Car Company
    - Service Company
  - Headquarters, Special Troops, in Mobile (AL)
    - Headquarters Company, 31st Division, in Mobile (AL)
    - 31st Signal Company, in Mobile (AL)
    - 106th Ordnance Company, in Mobile (AL)
    - 31st Military Police Company, in Prichard (AL)

On 15 December 1941, the 124th Infantry Regiment was relieved from assignment to the 31st Division and moved to Fort Benning, Georgia, where it was used as a demonstration unit for the United States Army Infantry School.

===== Triangular division =====
On 27 February 1942, as a part of an Army-wide reorganization of National Guard divisions, the 31st Division was reorganized as a triangular division. The division's two brigade headquarters were disbanded in favor of a structure containing three separate regimental commands reporting directly to the division headquarters, as well as four field artillery battalions under a division artillery headquarters, with the engineer, medical, and quartermaster regiments also reduced to battalions. On 26 February 1942, the 156th Infantry Regiment was reorganized as a separate regimental combat team and moved to Camp Bowie in Texas. The regiment was officially relieved from assignment to the division on 14 July 1942. With the reorganization the division was renamed 31st Infantry Division. Afterwards the 31st Infantry Division was composed of the following units:

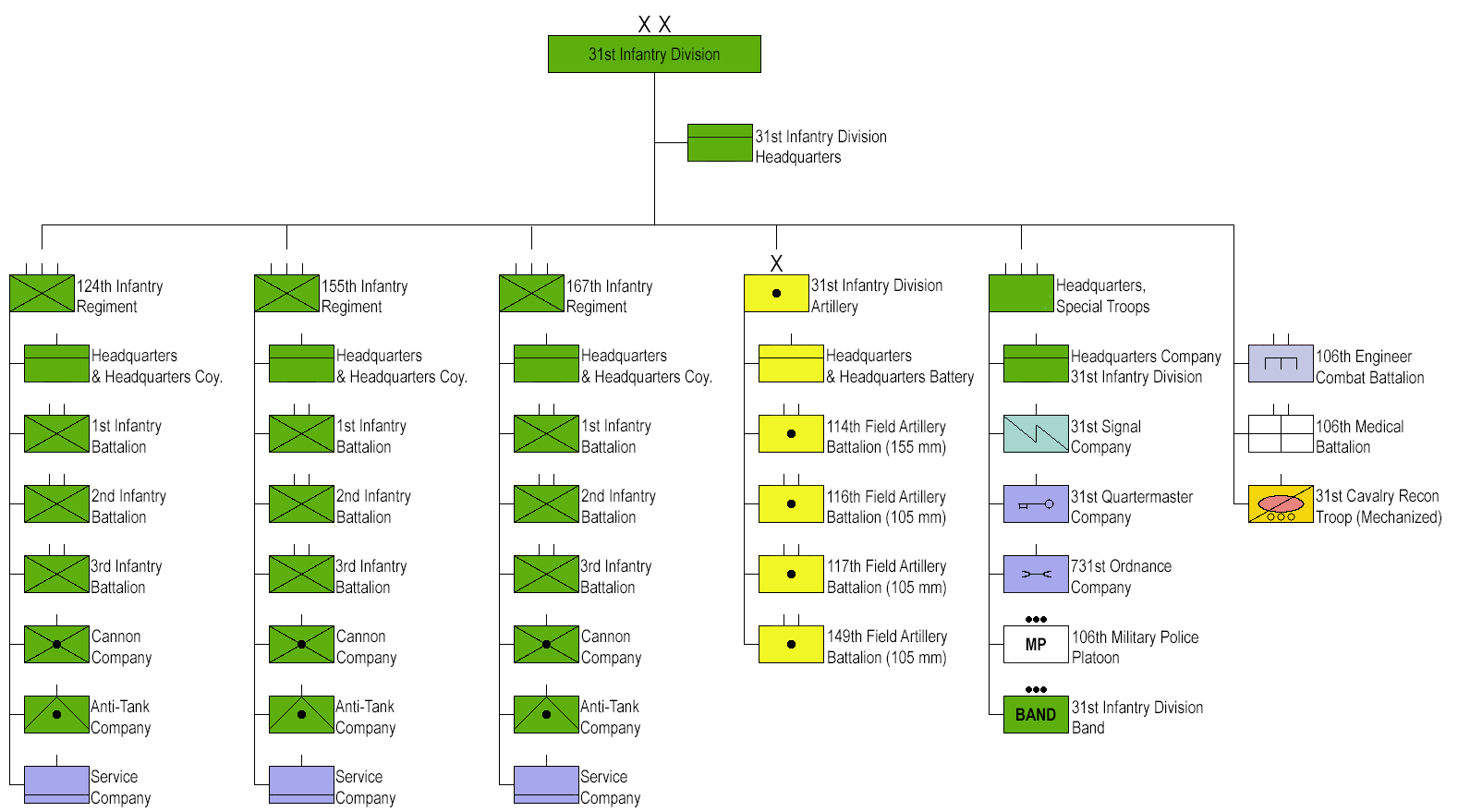
31st Infantry Division triangular organization (click to enlarge)

- 31st Infantry Division
  - 31st Infantry Division Headquarters
  - 31st Cavalry Reconnaissance Troop (Mechanized) (M3 scout cars and then M8 Greyhound armored cars)
  - 124th Infantry Regiment (relieved from assignment to the division on 15 December 1941; inactivated on 2 March 1944 at Fort Jackson, South Carolina; reactivated on 5 April 1944 in New Guinea with the personnel of the 154th Infantry Regiment)
    - Headquarters and Headquarters Company
    - 3× Infantry battalions
      - each battalion consists of: 1× Headquarters and Headquarters Company, 3× Rifle companies, 1× Heavy Weapons Company
    - Cannon Company (T12 Gun Motor Carriages and T19 Howitzer Motor Carriages, later replaced by either M3 105mm towed howitzers or M7 Priest self propelled howitzers)
    - Anti-Tank Company (M3 37mm anti-tank guns, which were replaced by 1944 with M1 57mm anti-tank guns)
    - Service Company
  - 154th Infantry Regiment (activated and assigned to division on 20 September 1942; inactivated in New Guinea on 5 April 1944 and its personnel used to reactivate the 124th Infantry Regiment)
    - same organization as 124th Infantry Regiment
  - 155th Infantry Regiment
    - same organization as 124th Infantry Regiment
  - 167th Infantry Regiment
    - same organization as 124th Infantry Regiment
  - 31st Infantry Division Artillery
    - Headquarters and Headquarters Battery
    - 114th Field Artillery Battalion
      - Headquarters and Headquarters Battery
      - 3× Batteries (M1 155mm towed howitzers)
      - Service Battery
    - 116th Field Artillery Battalion
      - Headquarters and Headquarters Battery
      - 3× Batteries (M2 105mm towed howitzers)
      - Service Battery
    - 117th Field Artillery Battalion
      - same organization as 116th Field Artillery Battalion
    - 149th Field Artillery Battalion
      - same organization as 116th Field Artillery Battalion
  - Headquarters Special Troops
    - Headquarters Company, 31st Infantry Division
    - 31st Signal Company
    - 31st Quartermaster Company
    - 731st Ordnance Light Maintenance Company
    - 106th Military Police Platoon
    - 31st Infantry Division Band (attached)
  - 31st Quartermaster Battalion (Between September and November 1942 Quartermaster battalions were disbanded and their platoons used to form a Quartermaster Company and an Ordnance Company, which were both assigned to Headquarters Special Troops)
    - Headquarters and Headquarters Company (includes a service platoon and a maintenance platoon)
    - Truck Company
  - 106th Engineer Combat Battalion
    - Headquarters and Headquarters and Service Company
    - 3× Engineer combat companies
  - 106th Medical Battalion
    - Headquarters and Headquarters Detachment
    - 3× Collecting companies
    - Clearing Company

==== Training ====
After being brought to war strength by the assignment of Selective Service draftees from its home area of Alabama, Florida, Louisiana, and Mississippi, the division participated in the IV Corps Louisiana Maneuvers in August 1941, the GHQ maneuvers near Good Hope Church between September and October as part of IV Corps, and the First Army Carolina Maneuvers near Ruby and Chesterfield, South Carolina during October and November as part of IV Corps, before returning to Camp Blanding. On 15 December 1941, the 124th Infantry Regiment was relieved from assignment to the 31st Division. It was used as school troops for the Infantry School at Fort Benning, Georgia until it was inactivated at Fort Jackson, South Carolina, on 2 March 1944.

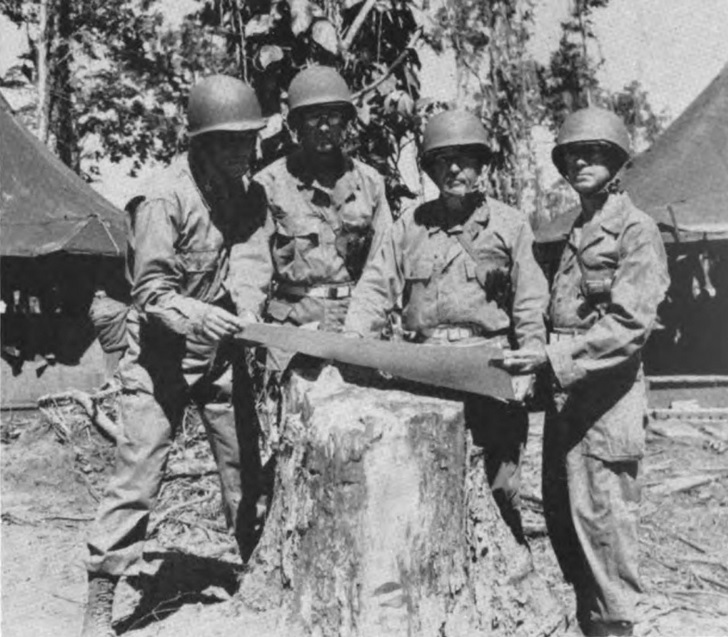
The Dixie Division's first wartime commander, MG John C. Persons (center) discussing the situation over a map with his officers in New Guinea in July 1944. Left to right: commander of 167th Infantry Regiment, Colonel LeRoy S. Graham; division artillery commander BG Sumter L. Lowry; MG Persons; and assistant division commander BG Joseph C. Hutchinson.

During mid-1942, six National Guard divisions were used as "virtual pools" by the Army Service Forces to provide cadres and fillers for thousands of new service units not previously envisioned in the Army troop basis, many earmarked for the upcoming Allied invasion of Axis-occupied French North Africa. The 30th, 31st, and 33rd Infantry Divisions were stripped of over 50% of their strength, while the 35th, 38th, and 44th Infantry Divisions suffered losses almost as great. The 31st Infantry Division declined from a strength of 15,200 in June 1942 to 7,200 in August. In the 38 months following its federalization in November 1940, the division gave up 1,453 officers and 22,511 enlisted men, enough personnel to man two divisions' worth of officers and one-and-a-half divisions' worth of enlisted men.

The 156th Infantry Regiment of the Louisiana National Guard was separated from the 31st Division on 14 July 1942. The unit was sent to England and then to Oran, Algeria, where it was redesignated the 202nd Infantry Battalion and assigned to military police duties due to the large number of French-speaking members of the unit. Portions of the unit participated in the D-Day landings, with the entire unit being reunited on 24 June 1944. The unit was later used to guard allied headquarters and supply lines in liberated territory. The unit returned to the US on 11 March 1946.

The 124th Infantry was temporarily replaced in the 31st Division by the 154th Infantry Regiment (a former designation of the 1st Florida Infantry Regiment from 1921-1923 until it was redesignated the 124th Infantry), which was activated 20 September 1942 in the Army of the United States. On 5 April 1944, the 154th Infantry was disbanded and its personnel and equipment used to reactivate the 124th Infantry Regiment.

The 31st Infantry Division staged at Camp Pickett, near Blackstone, Virginia, until it departed the Hampton Roads Port of Embarkation on 13 March 1944.

==== Combat chronicle ====
The 31st Infantry Division arrived in Oro Bay, New Guinea, 24 April 1944, and engaged in amphibious training prior to entering combat. Alerted on 25 June 1944 for movement to Aitape, New Guinea, the 124th RCT left Oro Bay and landed at Aitape 3–6 July 1944. The combat team moved up to advanced positions and took part in the general offensive launched 13 July, including the bloody Battle of Driniumor River.

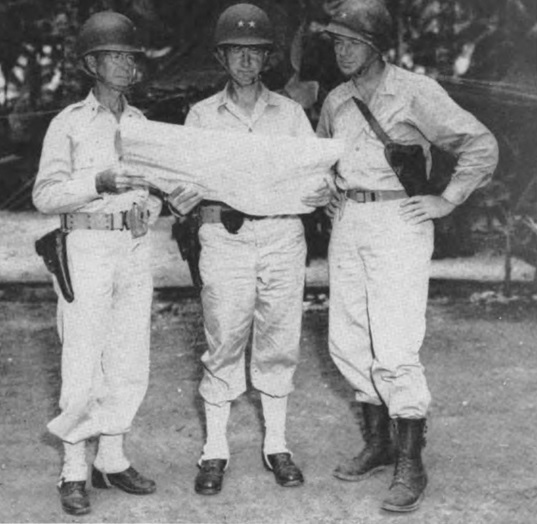
Dixie Division's commander MG Clarence A. Martin (center) with division's artillery commander BG Joseph C. Hutchinson and division's assistant commander BG Thomas F. Hickey (right) over the map in Pacific in late 1944.

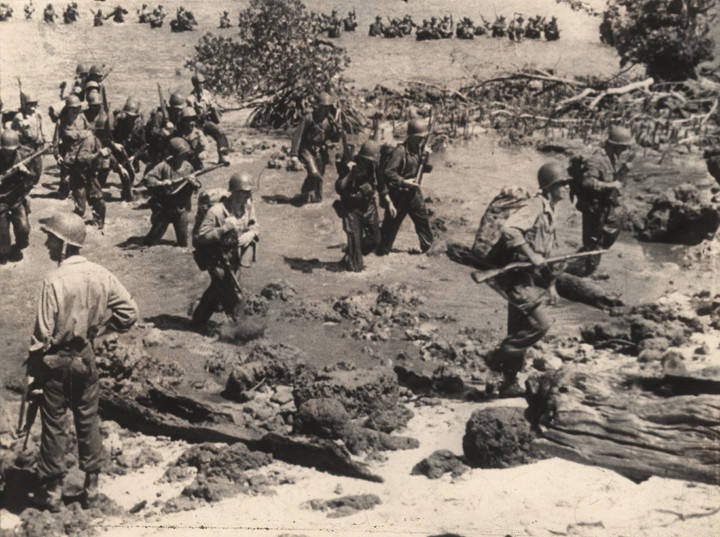
Soldiers of the division landing on Morotai

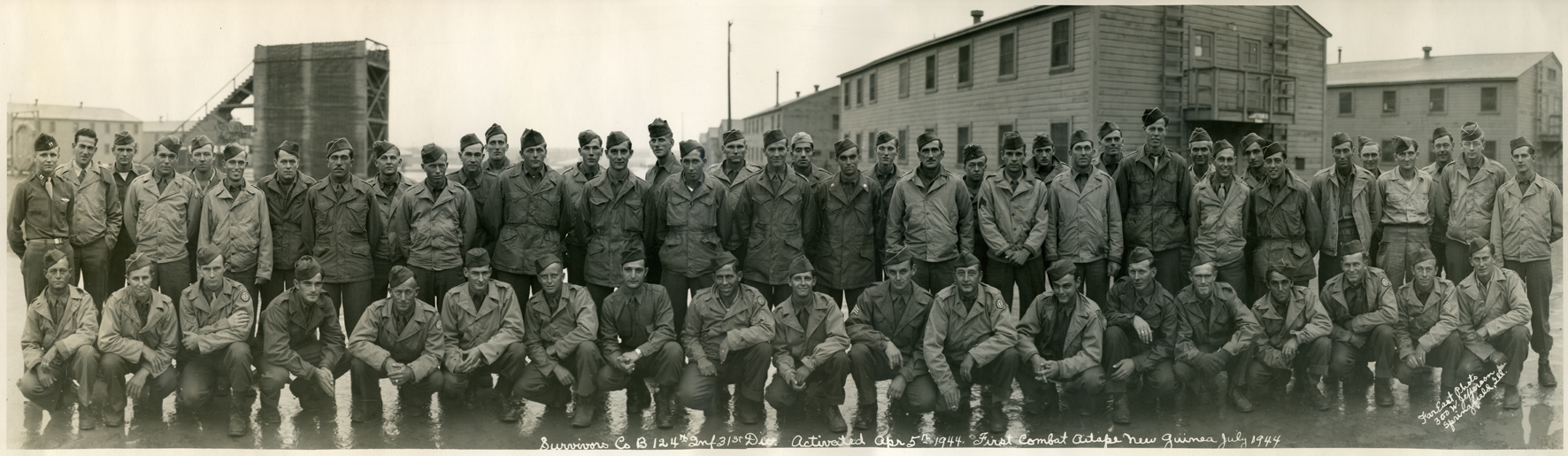
World War II combat survivors of Company B, 124th Infantry Regiment, U.S. 31st Infantry Division. The regiment arrived at the San Francisco Port of Embarkation on 14 December 1945 and was inactivated a week later at Camp Stoneman, California, where this photo was taken.

Meanwhile, the remainder of the division relieved the 6th Infantry Division in the Sarmi-Wakde island area, 18 July 1944, built bridges, roads, and docks, patrolled the area, and engaged small units of the enemy, trying not to provoke a large scale counterattack by the enemy. Over 1,000 Japanese were killed in these actions. In mid-August the division began to stage for a landing on Morotai, leaving Aitape and Maffin Bay, 11 September 1944. The division made an assault landing on Morotai, 15 September 1944, meeting only light opposition. During the occupation of Morotai, elements of the division, primarily the 167th Infantry Regiment, seized Mapia, 15–17 November, and waded ashore on the Asia Islands, 19–20 November, only to find the Japanese had already evacuated.

Other elements reverted to Sansapor, where they maintained and operated the base. On 22 April 1945, the division landed on Mindanao to take part in the liberation of the Philippines. The division was helped by the Filipino troops under the Philippine Commonwealth Army and Philippine Constabulary units and the local organized Christian and Islamic guerrillas fight the Japanese. Moving up the Sayre Highway and driving down the Kibawe-Talomo trail, fighting in knee-deep mud and through torrential rains, the 31st forced the enemy to withdraw into the interior and blocked off other Japanese in the Davao area. With the end of hostilities on 15 August, the 31st and the Philippine Commonwealth military were accomplished the surrender of all Japanese forces remaining in Mindanao.

The division returned to the United States and was inactivated at Camp Stoneman on 21 December.

==== Casualties ====
- Total battle casualties: 1,733
- Killed in action: 340
- Wounded in action: 1,392
- Prisoner of war: 1

==== Statistics ====
- Called into federal service: 25 November 1940; Camp Blanding, Florida (National Guard Division from Alabama, Florida, Louisiana, and Mississippi).
- Overseas: 12 March 1944.
- Campaigns: New Guinea, Southern Philippines.
- Distinguished Unit Citations: 1.
- Awards: MH-1; DSC-7; DSM-3; SS-178; LM-11; DFC-1; SM-73; BS-948; AM-77.
- Commanders: Maj. Gen. John C. Persons (25 November 1940 – 23 September 1944), Maj. Gen. Clarence A. Martin (23 September 1944 to inactivation).
- Assistant Commanders: Brig. Gen. Joseph C. Hutchinson (21 February 1942 to inactivation)
- Returned to U.S.: 12 December 1945.
- Inactivated: 21 December 1945

=== Postwar ===
The division was reorganized postwar in Alabama and Mississippi, with its Alabama part federally recognized at Birmingham on 1 November 1946, followed by the Mississippi part at Greenville on 2 December.

After the Korean War broke out in 1950, the division was called to active duty on 16 January 1951 at Birmingham. No units were deployed, but individuals representing three-fourths of the authorized strength were sent to either Korea or Japan as replacements. The 31st Infantry Division was transferred to Fort Carson, Colorado in February 1954 from Camp Atterbury. The 31st Division as an active service formation was then inactivated, with its personnel and equipment transferring to the 8th Infantry Division on 15 June. Meanwhile, in Alabama and Mississippi, units of the National Guard of the United States were organized to replace those on active duty, including a NGUS division headquarters at Birmingham on 26 June 1953.

The 31st Infantry (NGUS) Division was effectively reformed with units from Alabama and Mississippi, with its headquarters moving to Mobile on 10 December 1956 and back to Birmingham on 2 May 1959. It served as a National Guard division until its inactivation on 14 January 1968.

The division headquarters became the headquarters of the 31st Brigade, 30th Armored Division at Tuscaloosa on the next day. The headquarters company of the 2nd Brigade became the headquarters company of the new 31st Brigade. The Mississippi part of the Headquarters Battery of the Division Artillery became the Headquarters Battery of a new 631st Artillery Group.

Headquarters and Headquarters Company, 31st Brigade, 30th Armored Division was reorganized and redesignated 1 November 1973 as Headquarters and Headquarters Company, 31st Armored Brigade, and relieved of assignment from the 30th Armored Division. Location changed 1 February 1979 to Northport, Alabama. In 1984-5 the 31st Armored Brigade comprised the 1st Battalion, 131st Armor Regiment, 1st-152nd Armor, 1st-167th Infantry Regiment, 1st Battalion, 117th Field Artillery, E Troop, 31st Cavalry and the 31st Engineer Company. In 2002 it started transitioning to a chemical brigade, initially designated the 122nd. In November 2002 the brigade was redesignated the 31st Chemical Brigade.

On September 6, 2024, the 31st Chemical Brigade inactivated the Dixie Division SSI and transitioned to the new shoulder sleeve insignia.
