= Joseph C. Hutchinson =

United States Army general (1894–1982)

Joseph Carson Hutchison
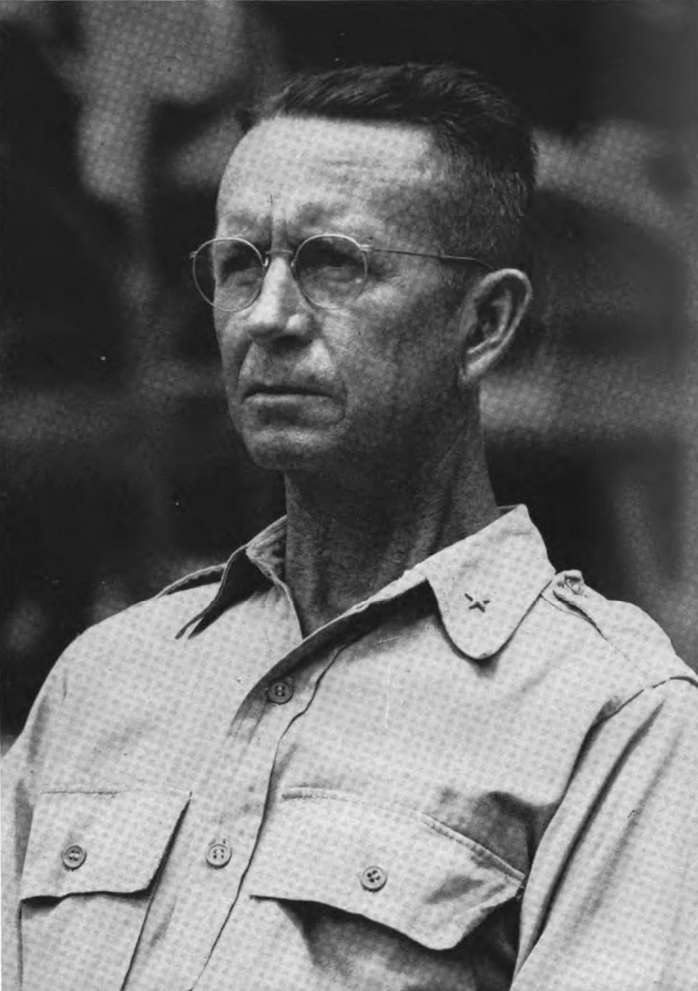
- Hutchinson as a brigadier general, June 1944.
- Born: September 17, 1894; Cross Hill, South Carolina
- Died: December 7, 1982 (aged 88); Sanford, Florida
- Military career
- Branch: United States Army
- Service years: 1917–1952
- Rank: Lieutenant General
- Unit: Field Artillery Branch
- Commands: 48th Infantry Division; 31st Infantry Division; 124th Infantry Regiment
- Conflicts: World War I World War II: New Guinea campaign; Battle of Morotai; Battle of Mindanao
- Awards: Silver Star; Bronze Star Medal; Air Medal

Joseph Carson Hutchison (September 17, 1894 – December 7, 1982) was a politician, businessman and decorated officer in the United States Army and Florida National Guard during World War II. He is most noted for his service as the assistant commander of the 31st Infantry Division during the Battle of Mindanao in 1945, when he accepted the surrender of the Japanese 35th Army under lieutenant general Gyosaku Morozumi on behalf of the Allied command.

== Early career ==
Joseph C. Hutchinson was born on September 17, 1894, in Cross Hill, South Carolina as the son of Joseph C. and Elizabeth Cauthen Hutchison. He attended the public schools in Ninety Six, South Carolina, and graduated from high school there in summer of 1912. Hutchinson then enrolled the Wofford College in Spartanburg, South Carolina, completing his courses in three years, he graduated with Bachelor of Arts degree in May 1915. While at the university, he was a Class Vice President and was active in the varsity football club, which he captained in his Senior year.

Upon his graduation, Hutchinson became a teacher of mathematics and sports coach in Seabreeze High School in Daytona, Florida. He later moved to Sanford, Florida and worked as a teacher of mathematics until the United States' entry into World War I in April 1917. He enlisted the United States Army in September 1917 and was assigned as Private to the Battery "B", 316th Field Artillery Regiment at Camp Jackson, South Carolina. Hutchinson was promoted to corporal one month later and participated in the intensive training for combat deployment in France.

Following his promotion to sergeant in April 1918, Hutchinson was transferred to the 333rd Field Artillery Regiment at Camp Grant, Illinois. His regiment embarked for France in August that year as a part of the 86th Division and after its arrival in Europe, Hutchinson was commissioned a second lieutenant in the field artillery on September 1, 1918.

He was subsequently ordered for additional officers' training to the Artillery School at Saumur on Loire river and remained there for one month. Hutchison then rejoined his unit, but the War ended before he could take a part in the action against German forces. He returned to the United States after the Armistice and was discharged from Federal Service in February 1919.

== Interwar period ==
After the war, Hutchinson returned to Sanford, Florida and became the manager of a Sanford grower; it was during a time when Sanford was becoming the center of Florida's truck farming industry, primarily by growing celery. He reenlisted the Florida National Guard and was assigned as a private to the 1st Infantry of Florida. His officer rank was confirmed one month later and he was commissioned a first lieutenant in the Infantry.

His unit was redesignated to a federally recognized 124th Infantry Regiment and during the following years, Hutchinson was consecutively promoted to Captain (May 1923), Major (February 1929), and lieutenant colonel (November 1933). Beside the annual summer trainings at Camp Joseph E. Johnston and Camp J. Clifford R. Foster (both located at the present site of Naval Air Station Jacksonville), Hutchinson's unit participated in the relief work and guard duty to prevent looting after the hurricanes of September 1926, September 1928, and September 1935; riot duty and protection of jailed prisoners from a mob in Tampa, Florida, in May and June 1927; guard and security duties in connection with the visit of President Franklin Roosevelt to Winter Park, Florida, in March 1935 and other.

Hutchins formed the J.C. Hutchison Co. in 1935, and later helped set up a network of crop growers in Florida. He assumed command of the 124th Infantry Regiment in August 1940 and was promoted to the rank of Colonel shortly after. The regiment was then a part of the 62nd Infantry Brigade under Brigadier general John C. Persons and upon Persons' promotion to the command of 31st Infantry Division "Dixie" on November 19, 1940, Hutchinson succeeded him as Brigade commander.

The whole 31st Division including Hutchinson's 62nd Brigade was called up for Federal service on November 25, 1940, and Hutchinson was promptly promoted to the rank of Brigadier general on that day. He then supervised the brigade's transfer to Camp Blanding, Florida as a new location for divisional headquarters was located there. He then took part in the Louisiana Maneuvers in August 1941, and continued in the First Army Carolina Maneuvers in October–November 1941.

== World War II ==
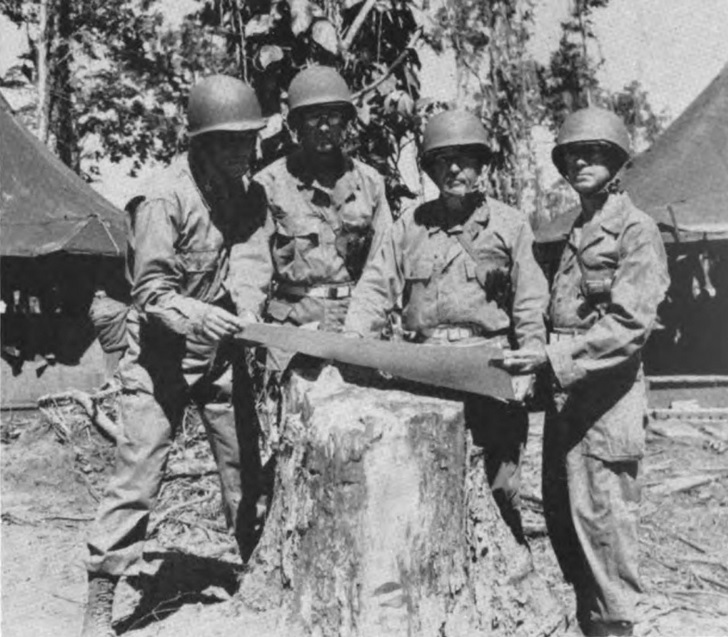
Hutchinson (right) during the field briefing with 31st Division's first commander MG John C. Persons over the map at New Guinea in July 1944.

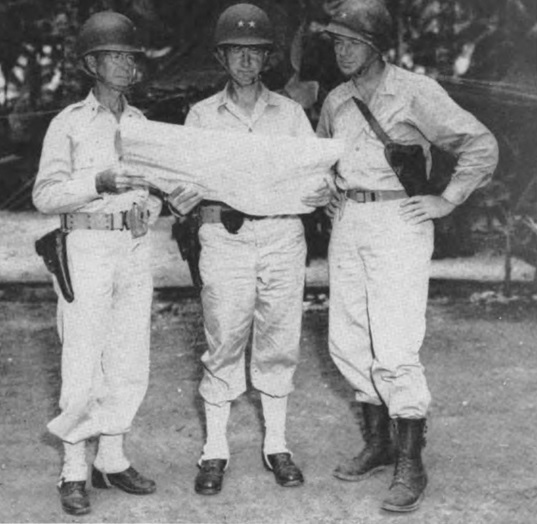
Hutchinson (left) over the map with 31st Division's commander MG Clarence A. Martin (center) and division's artillery commander BG Thomas F. Hickey (right) in Pacific in late 1944.

Following the Japanese Attack on Pearl Harbor and the United States' entry into World War II, the 31st Infantry Division was transformed from "square" infantry division structure into a triangular organization, centered on three instead of four infantry regiments. With the disbandment of Brigade's headquarters, Hutchinson was appointed Assistant Division Commander of 31st Infantry Division under Major general Persons in late February 1942.

He was then co-responsible for the division's intensive training and preparations for combat deployment until the beginning of 1944, when 31st Division received orders for movement to South West Pacific. The 31st Division arrived in Oro Bay, New Guinea on April 24, 1944, and engaged in amphibious training prior to entering combat.

Hutchinson then accompanied the division to Wakde, New Guinea, which served as a staging area for a landing near a village of Sarmi on the mainland. He was a Deputy Commander of Wakde Task Force under Persons and took part in the offensive against Japanese forces on division's perimeter to enlarge his sector. The 31st Division then built bridges, roads, and docks, patrolled the area, and engaged small units of the enemy, trying not to provoke a large scale counterattack by the enemy. Over 1,000 Japanese were killed in these actions.

He then participated in the assault landing on Morotai in the Dutch East Indies to secure a location for airfield, which could be used for the bombing of Japanese positions in the Philippines. Following a departure of Major general Persons by the end of September, new divisional commander, Clarence A. Martin retained Hutchinson as his deputy and they both supervised the division's training for the upcoming liberation of the Philippines while stationed on Sansapor and Morotai. For his service on Morotai, Hutchinson received Bronze Star Medal.

The 31st Division was ordered to combat in late April 1945 and landed on Mindanao and Hutchinson participated in the combats in the Agusan River and in the jungles around Waloe against the disintegrated Japanese 35th Army until the cessation of hostilities on August 15, 1945. Following the Japanese surrender, Hutchinson assumed temporary command of the 31st Infantry Division, when general Martin departed for the United States. While in this capacity, he accepted surrender of 35,000 men from the Japanese 35th Army under lieutenant general Gyosaku Morozumi on September 8, 1945.

Upon general Martin's return, Hutchinson relinquised division's command to Martin and resumed his duty as Assistant Division Commander. The 31st Division was then responsible for the evacuation of the Japanese personnel back to Japan until the end of October, when it was ordered back to the United States. For his service on Mindanao, Hutchinson received the Silver Star. He also received the Air Medal for participation in the aerial reconnaissance over Mindanao.

== Postwar service ==
The 31st Division returned to the United States on December 19, 1945, and Hutchinson was co-responsible for the division's inactivation at Camp Stoneman near Pittsburg, California two days later. He was released from Federal service on April 18, 1946, and resumed his duties with the Florida National Guard. Hutchinson returned to Sanford, Florida and became a community leader and local politician.

Following the activation of 48th Infantry Division of the Florida National Guard at Fort McClellan, Alabama in mid-September 1946, Hutchinson assumed duty as Assistant Division Commander under Major general Henry D. Russell. He succeeded general Russell as Division's commander in February 1951 and was promoted to the rank of Major General in the Florida National Guard one month later. While in this capacity, Hutchinson presided over the first division annual training event at Fort McClellan.

He retired from the Florida National Guard on February 29, 1952, and was advanced to the rank of lieutenant general in the Florida National Guard for his distinguished service during the war. Hutchinson then served as a member of the Seminole County Commission and served as its chairman in 1960–1964.

The General Joseph C. Hutchinson Parkway was named in his honor in 1963 (Until 1963, the stretch of two-lane pavement between U.S. Highway 17–92 and County Road 427 was known as Pennsylvania Parkway). In 1974, Hutchinson also received an annual Randall Chase Memorial Award for outstanding citizenship from the Kiwanis.

Lieutenant General Joseph C. Hutchinson died after a long illness on December 7, 1982, aged 88, in Sanford, Florida. He was buried at Evergreen Municipal Cemetery in Sanford. He was married to Annie Caldwell Whitner and they had two daughters.

== Decorations ==
Here is the list of Hutchinson's decorations with ribbon bar:

1st Row	Silver Star	Bronze Star Medal	Air Medal
2nd Row	World War I Victory Medal with one battle clasp	American Defense Service Medal	Asiatic–Pacific Campaign Medal with three 3/16-inch service stars
3rd Row	American Campaign Medal	World War II Victory Medal	Philippine Liberation Medal with one star

Military offices
Preceded by Henry D. Russell	Commanding General, 48th Infantry Division; February 7, 1951 – February 29, 1952	Succeeded by Joseph B. Fraser
