= 117th Field Artillery Regiment =

114th Field Artillery Regiment
- Country: (United States)
- Branch: United States Army
- Type: Field artillery
- Role: USARS parent regiment
- Size: regiment

The 117th Field Artillery Regiment is a field artillery regiment of the Alabama Army National Guard. The regiment's 1st Battalion is a cannon battalion assigned to the 142nd Field Artillery Brigade.

== Lineage and honors ==
=== Lineage ===
- Organized August–September 1916 in the Alabama National Guard as the 1st Cavalry.
- Mustered into Federal service 23 September 1916.
- Assigned 18 July 1917 to the 31st Division.
- Drafted into Federal service 5 August 1917.
- Converted and redesignated 4 October 1917 as the 117th Field Artillery and remained assigned to the 31st Division.
- Demobilized 17 January 1919 at Camp Gordon, Georgia.
- Reconstituted 1921–1922 in the Alabama National Guard as the 2d Battalion, 141st Field Artillery, an element of the 39th Division.

(141st Field Artillery relieved 1 July 1923 from assignment to the 39th Division and assigned to the 31st Division.)

- 2d Battalion, 141st Field Artillery, expanded, reorganized, and redesignated 17 January 1927 as the 117th Field Artillery with headquarters at Florala, and remained assigned to the 31st Division.
- Consolidated 15 March 1929 with the 55th Machine Gun Squadron (organized December 1921–January 1922 in the Alabama National Guard) and consolidated unit designated as the 117th Field Artillery.
- Inducted into Federal service 25 November 1940 at home stations.
- Regiment broken up 10 February 1942 and its elements reorganized and redesignated as follows: Headquarters and the 1st Battalion as the 117th Field Artillery Battalion, an element of the 31st Infantry Division; 2d Battalion as the 2d Battalion, 137th Field Artillery, and relieved from assignment to the 31st Division (Headquarters Battery consolidated with the Pioneer Company, 631st Tank Destroyer Battalion—hereafter separate lineage).
- 117th Field Artillery Battalion inactivated 8 December 1945 at San Francisco, California.
- Reorganized and Federally recognized 5 December 1946 with headquarters at Andalusia.
- Ordered into active Federal service 16 January 1951 at home stations.

(117th Field Artillery Battalion [NGUS] organized and Federally recognized 12 March 1953 with headquarters at Andalusia.)

- Released 15 June 1954 from active Federal service and reverted to state control; Federal recognition concurrently withdrawn from the 117th Field Artillery Battalion (NGUS).
- 2d Battalion, 137th Field Artillery, reorganized and redesignated 8 February 1943 as the 933d Field Artillery Battalion.
- Inactivated 29 October 1945 at Camp Kilmer, New Jersey.
- Reorganized and Federally recognized 4 December 1946 with headquarters at Enterprise as an element of the 31st Infantry Division.
- Ordered into active Federal service 16 January 1951 at home stations.

(933d Field Artillery Battalion [NGUS] organized and Federally recognized 27 February 1953 with headquarters at Enterprise.)

- Released 15 June 1954 from active Federal service and reverted to state control; Federal recognition concurrently withdrawn from the 933d Field Artillery Battalion (NGUS).
- 117th and 933d Field Artillery Battalions consolidated 2 May 1959 to form the 117th Artillery, a parent regiment under the Combat Arms Regimental System, to consist of the 1st and 2d Howitzer Battalions, elements of the 31st Infantry Division.
- Reorganized 15 April 1963 to consist of the 1st and 2d Battalions, elements of the 31st Infantry Division.

(1st and 2d Battalions ordered into active Federal service 11 June 1963 at home stations; released 23 June 1963 from active

Federal service and reverted to state control. Ordered into active Federal service 10 September 1963 at home stations; released 12 September 1963 from active Federal service and reverted to state control. 1st Battalion ordered into active Federal service 20 March 1965 at home stations; released 29 March 1965 from active Federal service and reverted to state control.)

- Reorganized 15 January 1968 to consist of the 1st Battalion, an element of the 30th Armored Division.
- Redesignated 1 February 1972 as the 117th Field Artillery.
- Reorganized 1 November 1973 to consist of the 1st Battalion, an element of the 31st Armored Brigade.
- Reorganized 1 November 1980 to consist of the 1st Battalion, an element of the 31st Armored Brigade, and the 2d and 3d Battalions.
- Withdrawn 1 May 1989 from the Combat Arms Regimental System and reorganized under the United States Army Regimental System.
- Reorganized 1 September 1992 to consist of the 1st Battalion, an element of the 31st Armored Brigade, and the 3d Battalion.
- Reorganized 1 September 1995 to consist of the 1st Battalion, an element of the 31st Armored Brigade, and the 2d and 3d Battalions.
- Reorganized 30 September 2002 to consist of the 1st and 3d Battalions.

=== Campaign participation credit ===
- World War I: Streamer without inscription
- World War II: Naples-Foggia: Rome-Arno: Southern France: Rhineland: Central Europe: New Guinea: Southern Philippines

Battery B (Luverne), 1st Battalion, additionally entitled to:
* World War II – AP: Papua; East Indies; Luzon

=== Decorations ===
- French Croix de Guerre with Silver Gilt Star, World War II, Streamer embroidered ROME-ARNO (933d Field Artillery Battalion cited; DA GO 43, 1950)
- French Croix de Guerre with Palm, World War II, Streamer embroidered ALSACE (933d Field Artillery Battalion cited; DA GO 43, 1950)
- Philippine Presidential Unit Citation, Streamer embroidered 17 OCTOBER 1944 TO 4 JULY 1945 (117th Field Artillery Battalion cited; DA GO 47, 1950)

Battery B (Luverne), 1st Battalion, additionally entitled to:
* Presidential Unit Citation (Army), Streamer embroidered PAPUA (Papuan Forces, United States Army, Southwest Pacific Area, cited; WD GO 21, 1943)

== Heraldry ==
=== Distinctive unit insignia ===
Description/Blazon A Gold color metal and enamel device 1 inch (2.54 cm) in height consisting of a shield blazoned: Gules, a fleur-de-lis within a diminished bordure dovetailed Or. Attached below and to the sides of the shield a Red scroll inscribed "PARATI ARMIS" in Gold letters. Symbolism The shield is red for Artillery with yellow bordure, showing that the regiment was originally Cavalry and was dovetailed into Artillery. The fleur-de-lis is for service in France. Background The distinctive unit insignia was originally approved for the 117th Field Artillery Regiment on 22 January 1927. It was redesignated for the 117th Field Artillery Battalion on 8 October 1942. It was redesignated for the 117th Artillery Regiment on 13 December 1960. The insignia was redesignated for the 117th Field Artillery Regiment on 11 July 1972.

=== Coat of arms ===
Description/Blazon Gules, a fleur-de-lis within a diminished bordure dovetailed Or. That for the regiments and separate battalions of the Alabama Army National Guard: On a wreath of the colors Or and Gules, a slip of cotton plant with full bursting bell, Proper. PARATI ARMIS (Ready at the Guns). Symbolism The shield is red for Artillery with yellow bordure, showing that the regiment was originally Cavalry and was dovetailed into Artillery. The fleur-de-lis is for service in France. The crest is that of the Alabama Army National Guard. Background The coat of arms was originally approved for the 117th Field Artillery Regiment on 25 January 1927. It was redesignated for the 117th Field Artillery Battalion on 8 October 1942. It was redesignated for the 117th Artillery Regiment on 13 December 1960. The insignia was redesignated for the 117th Field Artillery Regiment on 11 July 1972.

== See also ==
- Field Artillery Branch (United States)
- Army National Guard
- National Guard of the United States
