= John C. Persons =

United States Army general (1888–1974)

John Cecil Persons
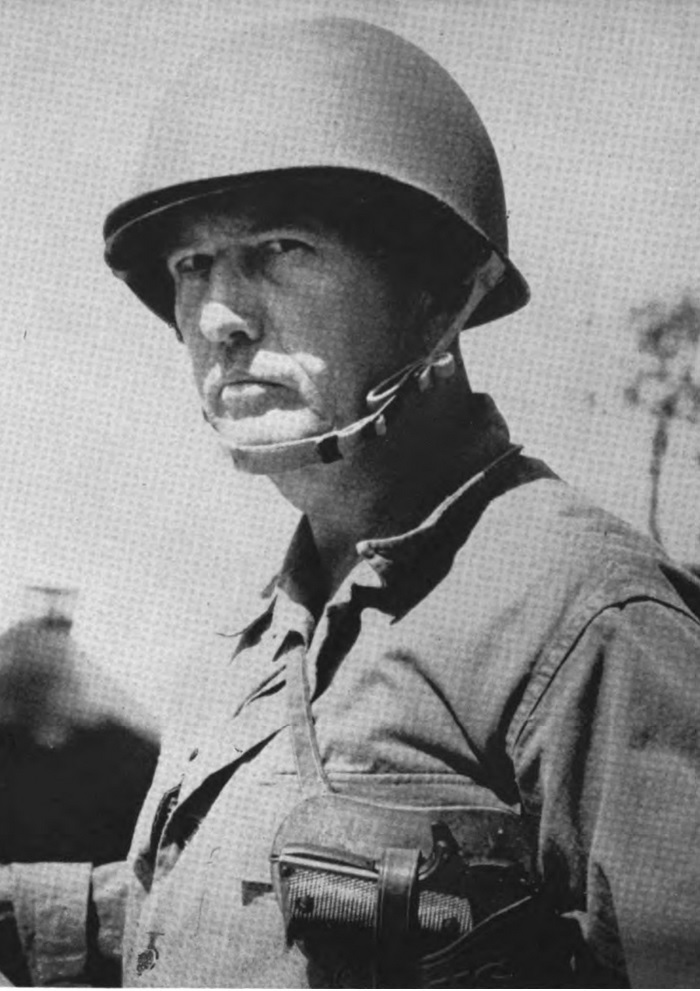
- Persons while in the Pacific in the summer of 1944
- Born: May 9, 1888; Atlanta, Georgia
- Died: December 22, 1974 (aged 86); Birmingham, Alabama
- Military career
- Branch: United States Army
- Service years: 1917–1919; 1924–1948
- Rank: Lieutenant general
- Service number: 0-203751
- Unit: Infantry Branch
- Commands: 31st Infantry Division
- Conflicts: World War I: Second Battle of the Marne; Meuse-Argonne Offensive; World War II: New Guinea campaign; Battle of Morotai
- Awards: Distinguished Service Cross; Army Distinguished Service Medal

John Cecil Persons (May 9, 1888 – December 22, 1974) was a lawyer, banker, and highly decorated officer in the United States Army and Alabama National Guard, who is most noted as the commanding general of the 31st Infantry Division during World War II.

Persons began his career as a lawyer and later served as an infantry officer during World War I, when he distinguished himself during the Second Battle of the Marne. He received the Distinguished Service Cross, the second highest decoration of the United States Army, and remained active in the Alabama National Guard after the war. Following the United States' entry into World War II, Persons commanded the 31st Infantry Division in the Southwest Pacific theatre.

== Early career ==
=== Civil career ===
Persons was born on May 9, 1888, in Atlanta, Georgia, as the son of William Matthew Persons and Alice Virginia Longshore. Following the high school, Persons moved to Birmingham, Alabama, in 1904 and was employed by the Alabama Consolidated Coal and Iron Company as an accountant, before he was admitted to the University of Alabama in summer of 1906. While at the university, he was a member of the Scabbard and Blade, Phi Kappa Sigma and Omicron Delta Kappa and Phi Beta Kappa.

Persons graduated with Bachelor of Laws degree in 1910 and following the admission to the Alabama bar, he began practicing law in Tuscaloosa, Alabama. He also served for a year as Treasurer of the University of Alabama and was appointed city attorney of Tuscaloosa in 1915.

=== World War I ===
Following the American entry into World War I, Persons enlisted the United States Army and was ordered to the Citizens' Military Training Camp in Plattsburgh, New York, for basic training. He was appointed Captain in the Infantry on November 27, 1917, and joined the 47th Infantry Regiment at Camp Syracuse. Persons assumed command of Company "F" and supervised the unit's initial training for upcoming deployment overseas. He was appointed Adjutant of his regiment in February 1918 and embarked for France two months later.

Persons arrived to Brest, France, in mid-May 1918 and after two months of additional training, his regiment was assigned to the VII French Army Corps near Bois du Chatelet. When the Germans launched Major offensive on the Marne River on July 15, 1918, the 47th Infantry was located near the town of Thibaud. The telephone lines to the rear had been destroyed by Germans and regimental commander, Colonel Herman Hall ordered Persons to deliver a message to the Brigade commander, Benjamin A. Poore.

Accompanied by a corporal and private, Persons reached Poore's headquarters under intense machine gun and rifle fire. He noticed that corporal from his party had been hit by enemy fire and was unable to move; Persons returned to the battlefield and with disregard for his own safety, he carried the wounded man to a dressing station in a storm of enemy fire, saving the corporal's life. For this act of valor, he was decorated with the Distinguished Service Cross, the second highest decoration of the United States Army. The citation for the medal reads:-

The President of the United States of America, authorized by Act of Congress, July 9, 1918, takes pleasure in presenting the Distinguished Service Cross to Captain (Infantry) John C. Persons, United States Army, for extraordinary heroism in action while serving with 47th Infantry Regiment, 4th Division, A.E.F., at St. Thibault, France, 8 August 1918. While serving as adjutant, 47th Infantry, Captain Persons was instructed by his regimental commander to deliver a message to the brigade commander. The telephone lines to the rear having been destroyed, he proceeded under intense enemy fire through a narrow pass, accompanied by a corporal and private of his regiment. Exposed to constant enemy fire, he had reached a place of safety when he learned that the corporal had been hit by enemy fire. Immediately returning, he carried the corporal to a dressing station in a storm of machine-gun and rifle fire from the enemy lines, thus saving the soldier's life and in utter disregard for his own safety.

He later returned to his regiment and received promotion to major on September 23, 1918. Following Hall's promotion and succession by Colonel Troy H. Middleton, Persons remained as his Regiment Adjutant and participated in the combats near Cuisy, Septsarges, and Brieulles-sur-Meuse until the Armistice.

== Interwar period ==
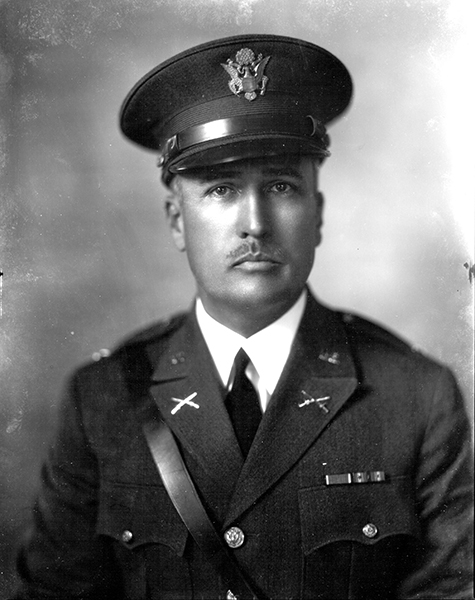
Persons as lieutenant colonel of the Alabama National Guard in the 1930s.

Following the war, Persons returned to the United States and was discharged from federal service on February 19, 1919. He subsequently started his own business, establishing the Persons Lumber Company. He sold lumber for one year before entering the banking industry, serving successively as vice president of the First National Bank of Tuscaloosa, president of the Traders National Bank in Birmingham, Alabama, and president of the American Traders National Bank.

On June 7, 1924, Persons entered the Alabama National Guard with the rank of lieutenant colonel and was appointed G-1 (assistant chief of staff for personnel) of the 31st Division, nicknamed the "Dixie" Division as it contained National Guardsmen from the Southern states of Alabama, Florida, Louisiana, and Mississippi. He was later appointed president of the First National Bank of Birmingham, and while in this capacity he also held additional responsibility as director of the Birmingham Branch of the Federal Reserve Bank.

On August 27, 1930, Persons was promoted to the rank of brigadier general and assumed command of the 31st Division's 62nd Infantry Brigade. His brigade consisted of two infantry regiments with National Guardsmen from Alabama and Florida. Besides the annual summer training, Persons led his unit in providing protection to civilians during race riots in Birmingham in early October 1931. Persons' unit was called up again in May 1937, when his brigade was tasked with relief duty in Bibb and Shelby Counties, Alabama, during hurricanes, and for flood relief duty at Prattville on April 16–19, 1939. For his service during these events, Persons received commendations from both the Alabama and Florida National Guards.

== World War II ==
=== Training and mobilization ===
The 31st Division was inducted into active federal service on November 25, 1940, and following the transfer of the divisional headquarters to Camp Blanding, Florida, Persons supervised the movement of his units from Birmingham. He was appointed commanding general of the 31st Division shortly afterwards, and promoted to the temporary rank of major general.

After the division's initial train-up period, Persons led it in the Louisiana Maneuvers in August 1941, and continued in the First Army Carolina Maneuvers in October–November 1941. Persons was then responsible for the division's transformation from square" infantry division structure into a "triangular" organization, centered on three instead of four infantry regiments. The 31st Infantry Division stayed at Camp Blanding, Florida, conducting intensive training until early 1944, when it received orders for deployment to the Southwest Pacific, partially because Persons complained to his superior officers that his division was far better prepared for combat deployment than many less-experienced divisions that were already overseas.

=== New Guinea ===
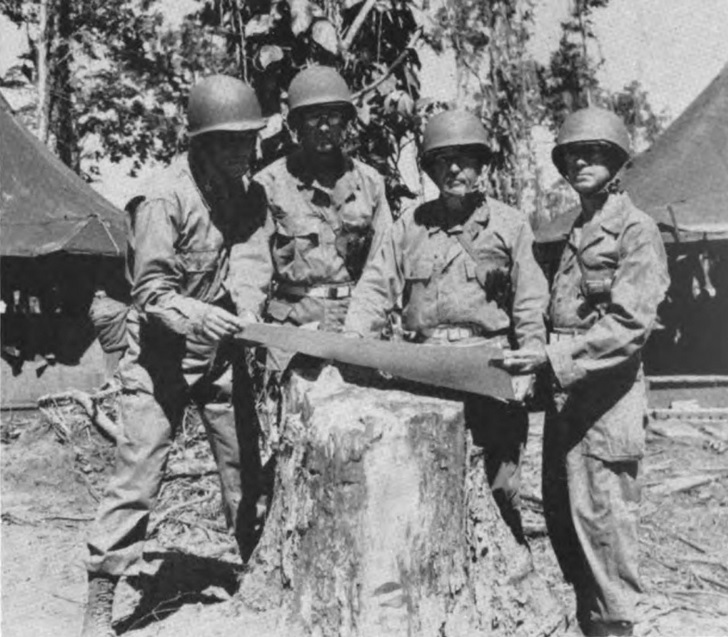
Persons discussing the situation over the map with his officers at New Guinea in July 1944.

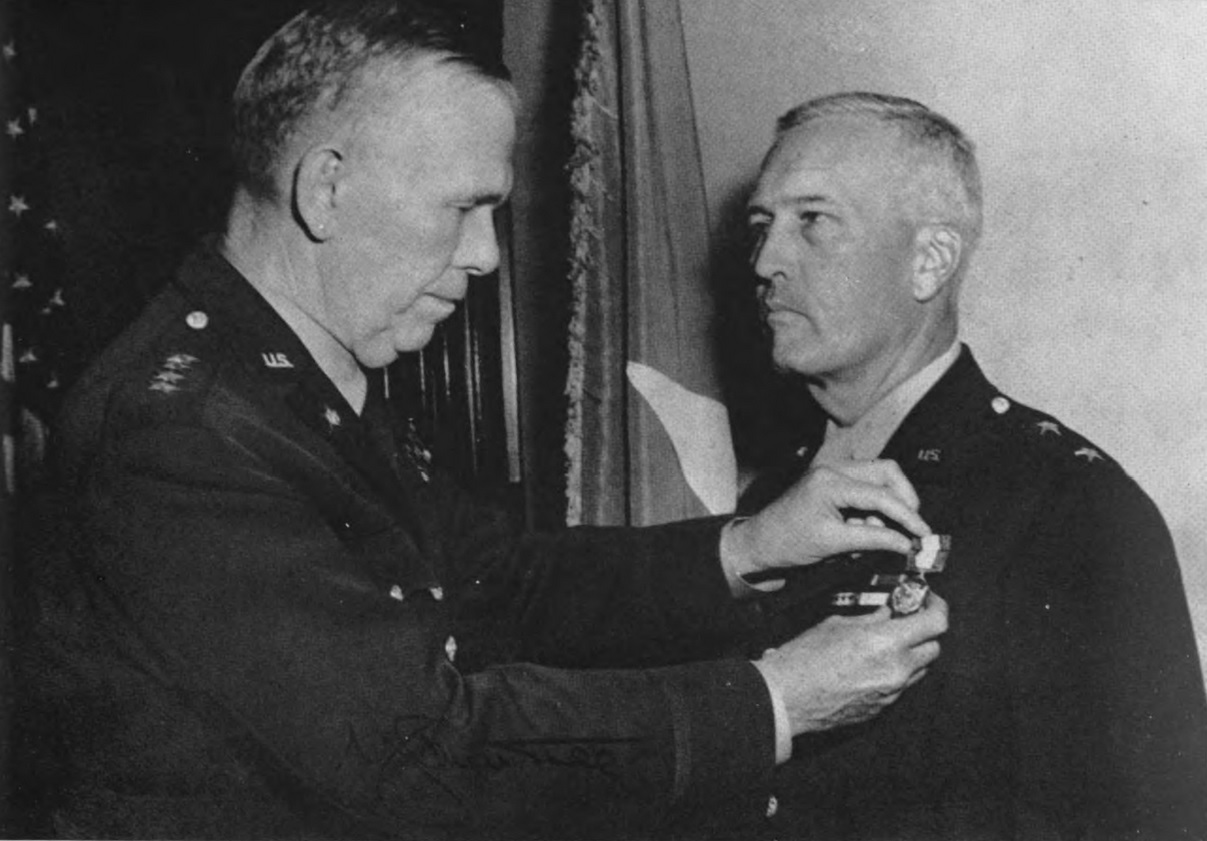
Persons receives Army Distinguished Service Medal from Chief of Staff, General George C. Marshall for his service with 31st Infantry Division at New Guinea at his retirement ceremony on January 1, 1945.

Persons and his division arrived in Oro Bay, New Guinea on April 24, 1944, and engaged in amphibious training prior to entering combat. In early July, parts of the 31st Division were ordered to Aitape, New Guinea, where it took part in the general offensive launched July 13, including the bloody Battle of Driniumor River.

Meanwhile, the remainder of the division relieved the 6th Infantry Division on Wakde, New Guinea, which served as a staging area for a landing near a village of Sarmi on the mainland. Persons assumed duty as commander of Wakde Task Force and launched an offensive against Japanese forces on his perimeter to enlarge his sector. The 31st Infantry Division then built bridges, roads, and docks, patrolled the area, and engaged small units of the enemy, trying not to provoke a large-scale counterattack by the enemy. Over 1,000 Japanese were killed in these actions.

To prepare for the liberation of the Philippines, General Douglas MacArthur ordered the capture of Morotai Island in the Dutch East Indies to secure a location for airfield, which could be used for the bombing of Japanese positions in the Philippines. Persons led 28,000 men ashore in early morning of September 15, 1944, meeting only light opposition. Despite the extremely difficult conditions on the beaches, he was able to land his troops in a few hours, and the original Japanese airfield on Morotai was secured before sunset.

However, only eight days later, Persons requested to be relieved of command, which was approved, and he turned over the division to Major General Clarence A. Martin. Persons stated that he decided to leave command due to his five-year absence threatening his position in the Birmingham Bank, but his subordinates believed he was disappointed when he realized that the Army would not promote him to corps command. He left for the United States, arriving to San Francisco, California, in early October 1944.

Persons was given a three-month leave of absence, which was to be followed by his transfer to an inactive status. Before that, he was ordered to Washington, D.C., where he received the Army Distinguished Service Medal from the Army Chief of Staff, George C. Marshall, for his service with the 31st Infantry Division. Persons underwent a routine examination at the Walter Reed General Hospital before he retired on January 1, 1945.

== Postwar career ==
Persons returned to Birmingham and took part in the reorganization of the Alabama National Guard, for which he was advanced to the rank of lieutenant general in the Alabama National Guard in June 1948. Persons then continued as the chairman of the board and president of the First National Bank in Birmingham and became a respected citizen of Birmingham. In 1972, he was appointed a member of the Alabama Academy of Honor.

Persons died following a stroke on December 22, 1974, aged 86, in St. Vincent's Hospital in Birmingham, Alabama. He was buried at Elmwood Cemetery there together with his wife, Elonia Dudley Hutchinson. They had together two daughters, Alice Virginia and Elonia.

== Decorations ==
Here is the list of Persons' decorations with ribbon bar:

1st Row	Distinguished Service Cross		Army Distinguished Service Medal
2nd Row	World War I Victory Medal with three battle clasps	American Defense Service Medal	American Campaign Medal
3rd Row	Asiatic–Pacific Campaign Medal with three 3/16-inch service stars	World War II Victory Medal	Alabama Distinguished Service Medal
4th Row	Alabama Commendation Medal	Alabama Faithful Service Medal	Florida Distinguished Service Medal

Military offices
Preceded by Albert H. Blanding	Commanding General, 31st Infantry Division; November 19, 1940 – September 23, 1944	Succeeded by Clarence A. Martin
