= 31st Cavalry Regiment (United States) =

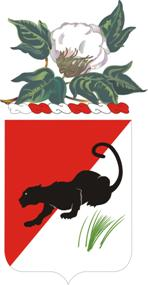
- 31st Cavalry coat of arms
- Active: 1821–60, 1860–65, 1874, 1898, 1916–17, 1921–42, 1942–60, 1973–2005
- Country: United States
- Branch: Army
- Type: Cavalry
- Nickname: "Super Quick Cav" (old)
- Mottos: "Celer et Non Visi" (Swift and Unseen)
- Engagements: Indian Wars; Mexican–American War; American Civil War; War with Spain; Mexican Border Conflict; World War I World War II; Korea; Iraq War

Insignia
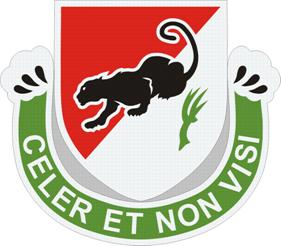
- Distinctive unit insignia

The 31st Cavalry is a historical organization within the United States Army and the Alabama Army National Guard that began as a Troop of Cavalry under "The Alabama Militia Law of 1820". The unit was constituted on 24 July 1821 in the Alabama Militia as the 1st Regiment Cavalry Troop at Jackson, Alabama

== History ==
The last unit to fly a guidon with a 31st Cavalry designation was Troop E, 31st Cavalry, a rapid deployment unit of the Alabama Army National Guard in Sylacauga, Alabama from 1973 to 2005. Troop E was formed in 1973 without an official history. It was created as a new unit to be the reconnaissance for the recently formed 31st Armored Brigade. When E-Troop of the 31st Cavalry was created, no one bothered to document the correct history of the unit. There was an unofficial and incorrect history done that attempted to trace the history of Troop E, 31st Cavalry, but that version would more correctly be titled a history of units that occupied the armory in Sylacauga, Alabama—and not a history of the 31st Cavalry and its lineage. Because the 31st Armored Brigade traced its history and lineage from the former 31st Infantry Division, that history makes the 31st Cavalry a direct lineal descendant of the earlier 31st Cavalry Reconnaissance Troop of the 31st Infantry Division.

The 31st Infantry Division was originally created in 1917, and after service in World War I, World War II, and the Korean War, it was later deactivated in 1968 as a part of a Department of Defense budget restructuring in order to make funds available to modernize several other National Guard Divisions. From 1968 until 1974 the Alabama units that had formerly been assigned to the 31st Infantry Division were transferred to the 30th Armor Division. In 1974 the 31st Separate Armor Brigade was formed, and in consequence, they became the inheritors of the 31st Division lineage. Upon the creation of the new 31st Brigade, they drew their manpower from the Alabama units that had previously been a part of the 31st Infantry Division. "E" Troop is specifically named in the Order of Battle for the 31st Armor Brigade, dating from 2005, back to the Brigades inception in 1974. The "official" lineage of E Troop / 31st Cavalry states that it was constituted on 1 November 1973, however, its lineage traces much further back into history. Prior to the 1973-4 creation of the 31st Cavalry, and its parent organization the 31st Armored Brigade, the 31st Infantry Division "order of battle" doesn't list a specific "31st Cavalry Reconnaissance Troop" until prior to 1960. During the period, from 1960, until the disbandment of the division in 1968: the reconnaissance mission for the 31st Infantry Division was first assigned to the 2nd Reconnaissance Squadron, 198th Armor (MSARNG); and in 1965 to that unit's later incarnation as the 1st Squadron, 98th Cavalry (MSARNG) and in 1973 to the still later incarnation as A Troop / 98th Cavalry (MSARNG) now located in Louisville, Mississippi. While A Troop / 98th Cavalry, of the 155th Armor Brigade does claim the lineage of having once been the reconnaissance asset of the former 31st Infantry Division from 1960 to '68, ... their own unit history ends further historical lineage by tying their history to the 750th Tank Battalion (with Headquarters in Greenville) as created in 1959. Alabama's "E Troop" is in no way lineal descended from Mississippi's 98th Cavalry, but is more akin to a prodigal brother, who after an absence of about 14 years had resumed the 31st's reconnaissance mission after the 1968 demise of the 31st Infantry Division, and the 1974 creation of the 31st Brigade.

According to the 31st Division order of battle, there was a "31st Reconnaissance Company" from 1954 to 1960. Prior to that, there was a "31st Reconnaissance Troop" from 1945 to 1954. Prior to that, there was a "31st Cavalry Reconnaissance Troop" from 1942 to 1945. According to the 1951 "Dixie Division" Year Book, the "31st Cavalry Reconnaissance Troop" was reorganized and redesignated as the "31st Reconnaissance Company" on 23 January 1948. It additionally states that prior to that, the Alabama-Mississippi National Guard was reorganized in 1946, and the Jackson, Mississippi based "31st Cavalry Recon Troop" was activated as a part of the "Dixie Division" on 26 February 1947. According to the 31st Division in World War II Year Book, the 31st Cavalry Reconnaissance Troop was formed on 26 February 1942 from the officers of Headquarters Company of the 61st Infantry Brigade, and from men from across the 31st Division's various regiments (including the Alabama 167th Infantry and 117th Field Artillery) who had been training in reconnaissance as a "special duty" assignment since early in 1941. Prior to the 1942 revision of the division level T/O & E (table of organization and equipment,) the 31st Division was not authorized its own direct reconnaissance asset. These are the same unit, with era modified designations, and are the direct lineal forebears of the modern "E-Troop, 31st Cavalry."

The division was organized at Camp Wheeler, Georgia (near Macon, Georgia,) on 1 October 1917. The 31st Division was composed of National Guard Troops from Georgia, Alabama and Florida, and included as its reconnaissance asset the 1st Regiment of Alabama Cavalry. Shortly after the division was formed, the T, O & E for infantry divisions deleted a reconnaissance asset at that level, relinquishing that mission to the Corps Level only.

The men, horses and equipment of the 1st Alabama Cavalry Regiment was divided into the 117th Field Artillery, the 106th Trench Mortar Battery, and the 118th Machine Gun Battalion.

In a 1949 publication of the 31st Division World War II history, the 117th Field Artillery claims to have begun its existence as the 1st Alabama Cavalry that was organized in 1916. Apparently the majority of former 1st Alabama Cavalry personnel gravitated to the horses of the then still "horse-drawn" Artillery.

The 106th Trench Mortar Battery was organized in September 1917 at Camp Wheeler, Georgia as component of 31st Division (56th Field Artillery Brigade) (formed from troops, 1st Cavalry, AL NG). Moved overseas in October 1918. Returned to the US January 1919 and demobilized at Camp Gordon, Georgia.

The 118th Machine Gun Battalion was organized October 1917 at Camp Wheeler, GA as component of 31st Division (62nd Infantry Brigade) (formed from the Machine Gun Troop., 1st Cavalry, AL NG, two companies, 1st Infantry, GA NG, and personnel from 1st Infantry, Florida NG). Moved overseas October 1918. Skeletonized November 1918. Returned to the US December 1918 and demobilized January 1919 at Camp Gordon, GA.

As a division, the 31st remained in training at Camp Wheeler until September 1918. The first units sailed for overseas on 16 September 1918, and the last units arrived in France on 9 November 1918. Upon arrival in France the division was designated as a replacement division and ordered to the Le Mans area. The personnel of most of the units were withdrawn from the division and sent to other divisions as replacements, causing the 31st to exist only as a skeletonized division. After returning to the United States, the division was demobilized in 1919. ... In 1923, the division was reorganized as a National Guard Division drawing its personnel from Louisiana, Mississippi, Alabama, and Florida. As an "infantry" division, the 31st was still not authorized its own reconnaissance asset under the then current T, O & E. The division also did not reorganize the 106th Trench Mortar Battery, or any of its Machine Gun Battalions. Personnel from those units who desired to continue National Guard Service were reassigned to other units.

The 117th Field Artillery had been reorganized in 1921 as the 141st Field Artillery under Colonel Allison Owen, and was Federally recognized on 26 March 1925. In 1926, another battalion and a squadron of cavalry were transferred into the 141st, completing the regiment. On 17 January 1927 the 141st F.A. was redesignated as the 117th Field Artillery, and on 1 August 1933, the regiment officially exchanged its horses for motorized transport.

The 1874 Adjutant Generals Report lists the following units as accepted into the Alabama Militia, (1) the Canebrake Guards as Cavalry and armed with Spencer Carbines, (2) the Wilcox Rangers as Cavalry and armed "privately", and (3) the Eutaw Guards as Cavalry armed with Spencer Carbines. And later, in 1898 the "Montgomery Mounted Rifles" were described as an independent Company of the Alabama Militia who had formed for the war with Spain in 1898, but were not called into active federal service, and did not deploy outside of its home state of Alabama. Prior to this incarnation, the Montgomery Mounted Rifles had once been a part of the First Alabama Cavalry during the American Civil War in the 1860s. Unanswered at this time is whether any of the other former companies of the First Alabama Cavalry, ... or any other cavalry company from Alabama made an attempt to reform. It is known that in 1898, that the former Confederate Fourth Alabama Infantry had reformed and joined into a brigade with other Alabama units, and were sent to Mobile, Alabama, but did not deploy into combat in either Cuba, Puerto Rico, or the Philippines.

With World War I looming overseas, the "First Alabama Cavalry" had been formed as a result of the "National Defense Act of 1916", and its troops were spread throughout the state. Their first lieutenant colonel was David Bibb Graves, who would later become Alabama's fortieth and forty-second Governor. Immediately after its formation, the regiment was assigned to the Alabama Brigade, and sent westward to New Mexico to participate in the Mexican Punitive Expedition against Poncho Villa. With valuable combat experience under their belt, they returned to Alabama in 1917 just in time to be assigned to the 31st Division as described earlier.

Going back to the period of the American Civil War, the lineage of the 31st Cavalry divides through the two different 1st Alabama Cavalry Regiments. There were in fact two different 1st Alabama Cavalry Regiments: one US; and one CS. Each was, Cavalry, and each were from Alabama, each can claim common lineage, but one unit served the Confederacy, while the other (obviously) served the Union. Ironically, they fought against each other in several campaigns and battles throughout the war.

Of the several companies of the First Alabama Cavalry, the "Montgomery Mounted Rifles" were the only Company who had acquired recent actual combat experience. While they were still an independent company, and were training with other southern troops at General Braxton Braggs "Camp of Instruction" in Pensacola, Florida, the "Montgomery Mounted Rifles", landed on Santa Rosa Island, Florida on 19 July 1861. They attacked a small boat from the Union ship – Mohawk, that was attempting to resupply the Union held Fort Pickens there on that island. The Federal crew suffered a number of wounded, and the officer in charge of the landing party was killed.

Prior to the Civil War period, the cavalry was formed as Independent Company's, that referred to themselves as "Alabama Mounted Volunteers." To differentiate between the different companies, they referred to themselves either by the name of their commander, or by a name given to themselves, (much like modern sports team names.) It is as these loosely knit independent companies that the lineage of the cavalry in Alabama traces back through the Mexican–American War, the Creek War and the Seminole Wars, and back to the Alabama Militia Law of 1820.

According to the Alabama Militia Law of December 1820, the Militia of Alabama included every able bodied male between the age of 18 and 45. The state was divided into four divisions, which was sub-divided into nine brigades, and sub-divided into thirty-two regiments, and each of those divided into between two and five companies each. Section 42. of the law stated that there may be one troop of cavalry, and one Company of Artillery in each regiment, organized in the same manner and liable to perform the same duties as volunteer companies. In Section 3, The County of Jackson, Alabama was designated as the First Regiment of the Alabama Militia, and thus was the origin of the 1st Regiment Cavalry Troop, the earliest documentable unit in the lineage of the modern E Troop / 31st Cavalry. Each company consisted of not less than forty privates and was commanded by a captain, followed by a lieutenant and an ensign, four sergeants, four corporals and two musicians. According to the Alabama Military Register, The first commander of the 1st Regiment of Alabama Militia was Colonel Louis Kirby, who received his commission on 28 March 1821, and the 1st Regiment's cavalry troop commander was Captain John Hampton, who received his commission on 24 July 1821.

Prior to Alabama becoming a US Territory, US dragoons and Tennessee Mounted Militia rode through what is now Alabama during the War of 1812. The US campaign was in retaliation for the 1813 "Red Stick" Creek Indian attack that killed over 400 settlers at Fort Mims just north of Mobile, Alabama. The "Red Sticks" got their name because of the US war with Great Britain, a schism had developed between two factions of the Creek Confederacy during the War of 1812 . During a ceremony, the two factions chose their allegiance by drawing either a "red stick" for war with the Americans (and an alliance with the British with the hope of reclaiming lost lands), while the others chose a "white stick" for peace with the Americans. In the resulting Creek War, General Andrew Jackson commanded combined forces of Tennessee militia, U.S. regulars, and Cherokee and Southern "White Stick" Creek Indians. Jackson defeated the Red Stick Creeks at the Battle of Horseshoe Bend in 1814, and afterwards initiated construction of a Fort atop the site of the old French Fort Toulouse near present-day Wetumpka, Alabama. Jackson briefly traveled to Washington and in his absence the fort was named "Jackson" in his honor. After Jackson's return, he imposed the Treaty of Fort Jackson upon the entire Creek Nation, regardless that the Southern half of the Creek Confederacy had been his "White Stick" Ally. The defeat of the Creeks allowed Jackson to take his troops on to New Orleans where he defeated a numerically superior English force in January 1815. Many of those Tennessee militiamen later migrated into the Alabama Territory and filled the ranks of the first Alabama militia.

== Chronological history ==
1820 – Authorized by Article #34 – Sections 3 and 42 "The Alabama Militia Law of 1820" and mustered for service in Jackson County as the Cavalry Troop of the 1st Regiment of the Alabama State Militia.

1833 – Reorganized for service against the Creek and Seminole Indians as several independent Companies of Cavalry, including (but not limited to): the "Autauga Light Horse" on 10 January 1833; the "Maplesville Light Horse" in 1833; the "Centerville Light Horse Company" on 18 January 1834; the "Canebreak Legion of Calvery" (s.i.c.) on 9 January 1835; Fry's Company of Alabama Mounted Volunteers on 5 September 1836; the "Coosa Calvery" (s.i.c.) on 23 December 1836; Bryson's Company of the North Alabama Mounted Volunteers on 26 October 1837; the "Greensborough Cavalry Company" in 1839; the "Dallas Mounted Guards" in 1845; the "Eutaw and Clinton Dragoons" in 1845.

1846–48 – Reorganized as a regiment of independent companies of Alabama Mounted Volunteers for service in the War with Mexico, including: the "Bouge Chitto Dragoons" on 1 March 1848; the "Catoma Light Horse of Montgomery Co." on 4 March 1848; the "Lowndesboro Cavalry" in 1848; the "Montgomery Dragoons" in 1848. During the Mexican–American War, the Alabama Mounted Volunteers served first on the Rio Grande, and subsequently with General Winfield Scott's forces at Veracruz, Alvarado, Tampico, and Jalapa.

1855–58 – Reorganized for the 3rd Seminole War of 1855–1858 as independent companies, including: the "Dale Dragoons" in 1850; the "Marshall Cavaliers" in 1850; and the "Alabama Dragoons" of Montgomery on 18 February 1854.

1860–61 – Reorganized as independent companies to be a part of the "Alabama Volunteer Corps" in anticipation of disunion and imminent Civil War, including: the "Coffee Mounted Guards" on 21 February 1860; the "McKinley Cavalry" in 1860; the "Montgomery Mounted Rifles" in 1860; the "Pleasant Hill Cavalry" in 1860; the "Prattville Dragoons" in December 1860; the "Sumter Mounted Guards" in 1860; the "Wilcox Dragoons", in 1860; the "Pearson Dragoons" of Tallapoosa Co. in 1861; and the "Powell's Dragoons" of Calhoun Co., also in 1861.

1861–65 – Reorganized as 1st Alabama Cavalry Regiment, (CSA) formed at Montgomery on 12 November 1861, including the "Montgomery Mounted Rangers" as Company "A;" the "Pearson Dragoons" as Company "D;" "Powell's Dragoons" as Company "E;" and the "Montgomery Mounted Rifles" as Company "K." It surrendered on 26 April 1865 as part of Hagan's Brigade, Allen's Division, at Salisbury, North Carolina, about 150 strong. This regiment participated in more engagements of one kind or another than any other unit in either army.

1862–65 – Concurrently also reorganized 1st Alabama Cavalry (USV) formed in 1862 in Huntsville, AL – While the vast majority of personnel came from Winston County, the 1st Ala Cav. USV drew troops from 38 different Alabama Counties. By the time Gen. William Sherman's forces entered Atlanta in late 1864, the "1st Ala. Cav.'s" reputation was secure. One general called the Alabama troops "invaluable." And Major General John A. Logan, commanding the 15th Army Corps in Sherman's forces, praised the troopers as "the best scouts I ever saw." General Sherman, chose them as his escort on the march from Atlanta to the sea. On 20 October 1865 the Regiment mustered out in Huntsville, AL.

1865–74 – Disbanded during the Post Civil War Reconstruction era.

1874 – The 1874 Adjutant General's Report lists the following units as accepted into the Alabama Militia: (1) the Canebrake Guards as cavalry and armed with Spencer Carbines, (2) the Wilcox Rangers as cavalry and armed "privately", and (3) the Eutaw Guards as cavalry armed with Spencer Carbines.

1898 (+/−) – Reconstituted as Montgomery Mounted Rifles, Alabama Militia for service in the Spanish–American War, but was never activated for Federal Service.

June 1916 – Reconstituted as 1st Regiment Alabama Cavalry, National Guard

25 August 1917 – Reassigned as 1st Regiment Alabama Cavalry, 31st Division, National Guard

September 1917 – Reorganized as 106th Trench Mortar Battery, 31st Division, National Guard. Organized at Camp Wheeler, GA as component of 31st Division (56th FA Brigade) (formed from troop, 1st Cavalry, AL NG). Moved overseas October 1918. Returned to the US January 1919 and demobilized at Camp Gordon, GA.

1 October 1917 – Also Reorganized as 118th Machine Gun Bn, 31st Division, National Guard at Camp Wheeler, GA as component of 31st Division (62nd Infantry Brigade) (formed from MG Trp, 1st Cavalry, AL NG, two companies, 1st Infantry, GA NG, and personnel from 1st Infantry, FL NG). Moved overseas October 1918. Skeletonized November 1918. Returned to the US December 1918 and demobilized January 1919 at Camp Gordon, GA.

Reorganized in 1921 as the 141st Field Artillery from the former 117th Field Artillery, 106th Trench Mortar Battery, and personnel of the former 31st Division machine gun battalions, the 141st F.A. was federally recognized on 26 March 1925. In 1926, another battalion and a squadron of cavalry were transferred into the 141st, completing the regiment. On 17 January 1927 the 141st F.A. was redesignated as the 117th Field Artillery, and on 1 August 1933, the regiment officially exchanged its horses for motorized transport.

25 November 1940 – The division was activated, and initially stationed at Camp Blanding, Florida without an integral reconnaissance asset..

26 February 1942 – While at Camp Bowie, Texas – Reorganized as 31st Cavalry Reconnaissance Troop. It was formed out equal numbers of men from the division's four Infantry regiments and engineers, ... the 31st Cavalry Reconnaissance Troop was reincarnated under its current name.

1944–45 – The 31st Infantry Division was ordered to the Southwest Pacific, and arrived in Oro Bay, New Guinea, 24 April 1944. Overseas, the Troop seldom worked as a unit, but attached elements to the regimental combat teams for all operations in which the division participated. For amphibious warfare, the Troop was provided with "tank landing craft" which it habitually employed as the first wave on landings as the Cavalrymen would clear the way across the beaches for the incoming Infantry. Alerted on 25 June 1944 for movement to Aitape, the 124th Regt. Combat Team (with a platoon of the 31st Cavalry Reconnaissance Troop) left Oro Bay and landed at Aitape, New Guinea, 3–6 July 1944. The combat team moved up to advanced positions and took part in the general offensive launched 13 July, running into bloody fighting along the Drinumor River. Meanwhile, the remainder of the division relieved the 6th Infantry Division (United States) in the Sarmi-Wakde Island area, 18 July 1944, and engaged small units of the enemy, trying not to provoke a large scale counterattack. Over 1,000 Japanese were destroyed in these actions. In mid-August the division began to stage for the Morotai operation, leaving Aitape and Maffin Bay, 11 September 1944. The Division made an assault landing on Morotai, 15 September 1944. During the occupation of Morotai, elements of the division seized Mapia, 15–17 September, and waded ashore on the Asia Islands, 19–20 September. Other elements reverted to Sansapor, where they maintained and operated the base. On 22 April 1945, the division landed on Mindanao to take part in the liberation of the Philippines. Moving up the Sayre Highway and driving down the trail, the 31st forced the enemy to withdraw into the interior and blocked off other Japanese in the Davao Region. With the surrender of General Tomoyuki Yamashita's Japanese forces on the Philippine Island of Mindanao, and the end of hostilities on 15 August 1945, the 31st Cavalry Reconnaissance Troop continued long range reconnaissance patrols into the hills of the Philippine's to contact and accept the surrender of various scattered detachments of the Imperial Japanese Army. In December, 1945, the Dixie Division returned home and was deactivated on 21 December 1945 at Camp Stoneman, California and returned to National Guard duty.

In 1946, the Alabama and Mississippi National Guards were reorganized, and the Jackson, Mississippi-based "31st Cavalry Recon Troop" was assigned as a part of the 31st "Dixie Division."

26 February 1947 – Redesignated as 31st Reconnaissance Troop, 31st Infantry Division (United States).

23 January 1948 – Reorganized and redesignated as the "31st Reconnaissance Company," 31st Infantry Division (United States).

16 January 1951 – Activated for Korean War service, and deployed to Camp Atterbury, Indiana, as "Training Troops. The division "was later ordered for deployment to Korea as "combat troops," but did not deploy as the "cease-fire" was called prior to their departure. Later transferred to Ft. Carson Co. in February 1954, prior to deactivation and return to National Guard Service.

1960–68 – The reconnaissance mission of 31st Infantry Division was assigned to 98th Cavalry (MSARNG).

1 November 1973 – Reorganized E Troop, 31st Cavalry, (Superquick Cav), 31st Armored Brigade

3 September 2002 – Activated for "Operation Noble Eagle" and deployed to Ft. Stewart, GA

In October 2002, E Troop, 31st Cavalry was reassigned as the brigade reconnaissance team (BRT) to the 149th Armored Brigade, 35th Infantry Division, while its former parent organization, the 31st Armor Brigade was reclassified as the 31st Chemical Brigade.

16 May 2004 – The 149th Armored Brigade was reassigned from the 35th Infantry Division to the 38th Infantry Division. E Troop, 31st Cavalry maintained its assignment as the BRT (brigade reconnaissance team) to the 149th Armored Brigade.

2005 – Deactivated and personnel and equipment reassigned to D Company, 1st Battalion 167th Infantry.

== Campaigns ==
Campaign participation credit

- 1st Alabama Cavalry Troop
  - Indian Wars: Creeks, February 1836 – July 1837; Seminoles, 28 December 1835 – 14 August 1842; 15 December 1855 – May 1858
  - Mexican War: Vera Cruz, 9–29 March 1847
- 1st Alabama Cavalry Regiment (CSA)
  - Civil War (Confederate service): Shiloh, 6–7 April 1862; Murfreesboro, 26 December 1862 – 4 January 1863; Chickamauga, 16 August – 22 September 1863; Chattanooga, 23–27 November 1863; Atlanta, 7 May 2 September 1864
- 1st Alabama Cavalry Regiment (USV)
  - Civil War (Union service): Murfreesboro, 26 December 1862 – 4 January 1863; Atlanta, 7 May – 2 September 1864
  - Mexican Expedition: Mexico 1916–1917, 14 March 1916 – 7 February 1917
  - World War I: Streamer without inscription
- 31st Cavalry Reconnaissance Troop
  - World War II: New Guinea, 24 January 1943 – 31 December 1944 (with arrowhead); Western Pacific, 15 June 1944 – 2 September 1945 (with arrowhead); Southern Philippines, 27 February – 4 July 1945
- 31st Reconnaissance Troop
  - Korea: Streamer without inscription
- E Troop, 31st Cavalry Regiment
  - War on Terrorism Service: Operation Noble Eagle I; Operation Noble Eagle II; Operation Noble Eagle III

Decorations

- 31st Cavalry Regiment
  - none

== Heraldry ==
Distinctive unit insignia

- Description: A Silver color metal and enamel device 1 1/8 inches (2.9 cm) in height overall consisting of a shield blazoned: Per bend sinister Gules and Argent, a crouching panther, tail elevated, Sable; to sinister a shrub Vert. Attached below a green motto scroll with the ends forming cat paws armed Sable, inscribed "CELER ET NON VISI" in Silver letters.
- Symbolism: Scarlet and white (silver) represent the Cavalry branch. The panther embodies the qualities emphasized by the motto, "Swift and Unseen." Black denotes strength and solidarity. The paws and claws terminating the motto scroll symbolize tenacity and a readiness to fight. The green of the scroll and shrub on the shield signify growth and the land which is a traditional cavalry environment. Scarlet also denotes courage and sacrifice.
- Background: The distinctive unit insignia was approved on 30 December 2003.

Coat of arms

- Blazon:
- Shield: Per bend sinister Gules and Argent, a crouching panther, tail elevated, Sable; to sinister base a stand of grasses Vert.
- Crest: That for the regiments and separate battalions of the Alabama Army National Guard: From a wreath Argent and Gules, a slip of cotton plant with full bursting boll Proper.
- Motto: CELER ET NON VISI (Swift and Unseen).
- Symbolism:
  - Shield: Scarlet and white represent Cavalry. The panther embodies the characteristics and abilities noted by the motto's meaning, "Swift and Unseen." Black denotes strength and solidarity. The grasses signify growth and the land, the traditional home of cavalry.
  - Crest: The crest is that of the Alabama Army National Guard.
- Background: The coat of arms was approved on 30 December 2003.
  - Note: The present DUI as adopted by vote of members of the troop while deployed for post 11 September 2001 homeland defense at Fort Stewart, Georgia as a part of Operation Noble Eagle. Historical research was conducted by then ranked SGT Rodger Williamson. The panther design was a homage to the World War II era unofficial DUI adopted by almost all reconnaissance cavalry Troops. That design was a yellow (for cavalry) triangle (for armor) with a leaping black panther (for the stealth and striking power of a reconnaissance unit.) Because E Troop, 31st Cavalry was in transition away from heavy armored cavalry into a light brigade reconnaissance team, the yellow triangle was replaced with a red & white shield to indicate the colors of a cavalry guidon. The motto was suggested by then ranked CPT Stephen Messer who was the troop commander, and by unit vote the motto was then translated into Latin. Artwork for the coat of arms and DUI was done by then ranked SSG Chris Smith.
