= 116th Field Artillery Regiment =

Florida army national guard unit

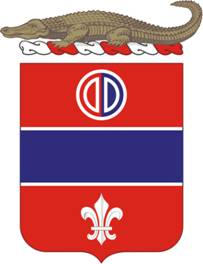
- Coat of arms
- Active: 1898 to present
- Country: United States
- Branch: Florida Army National Guard
- Type: Field Artillery
- Nickname: Gator Red Legs
- Motto: VESTIGIA NULLA RETRORSUM ("There Is No Going Back")
- Battle honours: World War I; World War II

Commanders
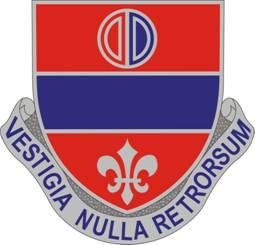
- Notable commanders

The 116th Field Artillery is a regiment of the Florida Army National Guard. Currently there are two battalions; 2-116th FA is fires battalion for the 53rd Brigade Combat Team, and 3-116th (HIMARS) is part of the 164th Air Defense Artillery Brigade, both of the Florida Army National Guard.

== History ==
The 116th Field Artillery has had a singular history in the period covered since the date of its organization in Florida. Perhaps no regiment of the Florida National Guard within the United States has had such dramatic calls upon its services. Woven into the pattern of everyday life, the work of the peacetime soldier calls forth little notice from the general public. However, when disaster threatens the structure of the commonwealth, either man-made, or by the hand of Providence, the National Guard steps promptly into the breach, and, with a steady hand firmly applied, brings aid and comfort to the stricken and punishment to the law breaker.

— From the official regimental history, compiled by Lieutenant Colonel George E. Grace, Florida Army National Guard

The regiment was originally organized as the 1st Florida Infantry during the Spanish–American War in 1898. During the First World War at Camp Wheeler, Georgia from 1 October 1917 through 1 November 1917, the 1st Florida Infantry was combined with other units from Alabama and Georgia to create the 116th Field Artillery, part of the 31st ("Dixie") Division. It consisted of the battalion headquarters and Batteries B and C from the 1st Battalion, Georgia Field Artillery, 4 officers and 99 men from the 1st Florida Infantry Regiment, Troops A, D, G, H, I, and the Supply Troop from the 1st Alabama Cavalry Regiment, and the Band from the 2nd Alabama Infantry Regiment. Although transported overseas, it saw no combat action and was mustered out of federal service on 16 January 1919.

On 5 December 1921 Sumter de Leon Lowry Jr., of Tampa, Florida, upon commission issued by the Adjutant General of the State of Florida, presented for federal recognition three batteries to constitute units of a regiment to be known as the 116th Field Artillery. Thus, on 5 December 1921, three firing batteries, A, B, and C, formed the basis of the First Battalion, 116th Field Artillery, Major Sumter L. Lowry Jr. commanding. The battalion was inspected and mustered into service by then-Lieutenant Colonel Vivian Collins, Adjutant General of Florida. Completion of the First Battalion was effected on 15 February 1922, with the establishment of the Headquarters Battery and Combat Train. In 1922, the City of Tampa and Hillsborough County furnished land and funds for the construction of stables, gunsheds, and armory buildings.

An expansive movement was made for the establishment of a full regiment by the founding of the Second Battalion. Firing batteries D, E, and F were located at Lakeland, Plant City, and Arcadia, with the Headquarters Battery and Combat Train of the Second Battalion in Bartow. The Second Battalion participated in the summer encampment in 1923, and was federally recognized as a unit on 23 August 1923, with Major Fred Hampton commanding. The regiment received federal recognition at Tampa on 20 January 1924.

Ultimately, the subordinate units of the 2nd Battalion, 116th Field Artillery were re-designated and relocated in some cases in different cities: HQ Battery – Lakeland. Battery A – Bartow. Battery B – Dade City. Battery C – Ocala. Service Battery – Haines City.

On 16 July 1933, the regiment was converted from horse-drawn to truck-drawn.

The regiment performed hurricane relief duties at Tampa and Moore Haven, Florida, from 16 September to 7 November 1926. The regiment, less two batteries, was used for riot control duties in connection with the protection of prisoners at the Hillsborough County Jail in Tampa, from 31 May to 6 June 1927. The entire regiment was used for duties associated with the Mediterranean Fruit Fly quarantine in July 1929. The 2nd Battalion performed hurricane relief duties at Palm Beach and Okeechobee from 17 September to 4 November 1928. The entire regiment was used for riot control duties in connection with elections in Tampa in September 1935. Several batteries were used for guard duties in connection with the visit of President Franklin D. Roosevelt to Winter Park, Florida, on 31 March 1936.

Organization of 116th Field Artillery Regiment, 1939
| Unit | Location | Federally recognized | Notes |
|---|---|---|---|
| Headquarters | Tampa | 20 January 1924 | |
| Medical Department Detachment | Tampa | 6 October 1922 | |
| Headquarters Battery | St. Petersburg | 13 January 1937 | Originally recognized as 118th Ambulance Company, 106th Medical Regiment, 15 April 1936; redesignated Company F, 106th Medical Regiment, 1 January 1937; redesignated Headquarters Battery, 116th Field Artillery, 13 January 1937 |
| Service Battery (less Band Section) | Arcadia | 1 April 1937 | Originally recognized as Battery F, 116th Field Artillery, 19 September 1923; redesignated Service Battery (less Band Section), 116th Field Artillery, 1 April 1937 |
| Headquarters, 1st Battalion | Tampa | 15 February 1922 | |
| Headquarters Battery and Combat Train, 1st Battalion | Tampa | 15 February 1922 | |
| Battery A | Tampa | 5 December 1921 | |
| Battery B | Tampa | 5 December 1921 | |
| Battery C | Tampa | 5 December 1921 | |
| Headquarters, 2nd Battalion | Haines City | 21 March 1924 | |
| Headquarters Battery and Combat Train, 2nd Battalion | Bartow | 21 August 1923 | |
| Battery D | Lakeland | 10 October 1923 | |
| Battery E | Plant City | 15 August 1923 | |
| Battery F | Winter Haven | 1 April 1937 | Originally recognized as Service Battery (less Band Section), 116th Field Artillery, 29 August 1923; redesignated Battery F, 116th Field Artillery, 1 April 1937 |

The 2nd Battalion, 116th Field Artillery has seen service in Iraq and Afghanistan and served in Homestead, Florida in the aftermath of Hurricane Andrew.

== Lineage and honors ==
=== Lineage ===
- Constituted 18 September 1917 in the National Guard as the 116th Field Artillery and assigned to the 31st Division.
- Organized 1 October–1 November 1917 at Camp Wheeler, Georgia, with National Guard personnel from Alabama, Florida, and Georgia.
- Demobilized 16 January 1919 at Camp Gordon, Georgia.
- Reconstituted 14 December 1921 in the Florida National Guard as the 116th Field Artillery and assigned to the 31st Division.
- Organized 1922–1924 in Florida; Headquarters Federally recognized 20 January 1924 at Tampa.
- Inducted into Federal service 25 November 1940 at home stations.
- Regiment broken up 27 February 1942 and its elements reorganized and redesignated as follows:

Headquarters disbanded
1st and 2d Battalions as the 116th and 149th Field Artillery Battalions, elements of the 31st Infantry Division (remainder of regiment—hereafter separate lineages)

- 116th Field Artillery Battalion inactivated 20 December 1945 at Camp Stoneman, California.
- Relieved 13 June 1946 from assignment to the 31st Infantry Division.
- Assigned 5 July 1946 to the 51st Infantry Division.
- Consolidated 7 November 1946 with Headquarters, 116th Field Artillery (reconstituted 25 August 1945), and consolidated unit reorganized and Federally recognized as the 116th Field Artillery Battalion with headquarters at Tampa.
- 149th Field Artillery Battalion inactivated 21 December 1945 at Camp Stoneman, California.
- Relieved 13 June 1946 from assignment to the 31st Infantry Division.
- Assigned 5 July 1946 to the 48th Infantry Division.
- Reorganized and Federally recognized 8 November 1946 with headquarters at Lakeland.
- Reorganized and redesignated 1 November 1955 as the 149th Armored Field Artillery Battalion, an element of the 48th Armored Division.
- 116th Field Artillery Battalion and 149th Armored Field Artillery Battalion consolidated 15 April 1959 to form the 116th Artillery, a parent regiment under the Combat Arms Regimental System, to consist of the 1st and 3d Howitzer Battalions, elements of the 51st Infantry Division, and the 2d Howitzer Battalion, an element of the 48th Armored Division.
- Reorganized 15 February 1963 to consist of the 1st and 3d Howitzer Battalions and the 2d Howitzer Battalion, an element of the 53d Separate Infantry Brigade.
- Reorganized 1 March 1964 to consist of the 1st and 3d Howitzer Battalions and the 2d Battalion, an element of the 53d Armored Brigade.
- Reorganized 20 January 1968 to consist of the 1st Battalion and the 2d Battalion, an element of the 53d Infantry Brigade.
- Redesignated 1 May 1972 as the 116th Field Artillery.
- Reorganized 1 October 1984 to consist of the 1st and 3d Battalions and the 2d Battalion, an element of the 53d Infantry Brigade.
- Withdrawn 1 June 1989 from the Combat Arms Regimental System and reorganized under the United States Army Regimental System.
- Reorganized 1 September 1993 to consist of the 2d Battalion, an element of the 53d Infantry Brigade, and the 3d Battalion.

=== Campaign participation credit ===
- World War I: Streamer without inscription
- World War II: New Guinea (with arrowhead); Southern Philippines\

Headquarters Battery (Lakeland), 2d Battalion, additionally entitled to:
- World War II – AP: Western Pacific (with arrowhead)

- Operation Enduring Freedom (2-116th)

- Consolidation Phase

- Operation Iraqi Freedom (3-116th)
- Operation Iraqi Freedom (2-116th)
- Operation New Dawn (2-116th)
- Operation Inherent Resolve (3-116th)

Operation Spartan Shield

=== Decorations ===
| Ribbon | Award | Streamer embroidered | Order No. | Unit Awarded |
|---|---|---|---|---|
| Red ribbon | Meritorious Unit Commendation | Afghanistan 10 July 2005 to 7 July 2006 | Army General Orders 2018–23, dated 6 September 2018 | 2d Battalion, 116th Field Artillery |
| Red ribbon | Meritorious Unit Commendation | Iraq 2005 to 2006 | AAMH-FPO Memorandum, dated 27 August 2008 | 3d Battalion, 116th Field Artillery |
| | Philippine Presidential Unit Citation | 17 October 1944 to 4 July 1945 | Department of the Army General Orders 47-1950 | 116th Field Artillery and 149th Field Artillery Battalions |

== See also ==
- 53rd Infantry Brigade Combat team
- 31st Infantry Division
- Florida Army National Guard
