= 53rd Infantry Brigade Combat Team =

- Shoulder sleeve insignia
- Active: 5 December 1921–20 December 1945 (elements of 116th Field Artillery); 5 July 1946–15 February 1963 (elements of 116th Field Artillery); 15 February 1963–1 March 1964 (HHC 53rd Infantry Div.); 1 March 1964–20 January 1968 (HHC 53rd Armored Bge.); 20 January 1968–mid 2006 (HHC 53rd Infantry Bge.); mid 2006-present (53rd IBCT)
- Country: United States
- Allegiance: Florida Army National Guard
- Branch: United States Army National Guard
- Type: light infantry
- Size: Brigade
- Part of: Separate infantry brigade, aligned to 29th Infantry Division (United States)
- Garrison/HQ: Pinellas Park, Florida
- Nickname: "Gator Brigade"
- Engagements: World War II; New Guinea; Southern Philippines; Global War on Terrorism; Afghanistan; Iraq; Operation Enduring Freedom – Horn of Africa

Insignia
- Distinctive unit insignia

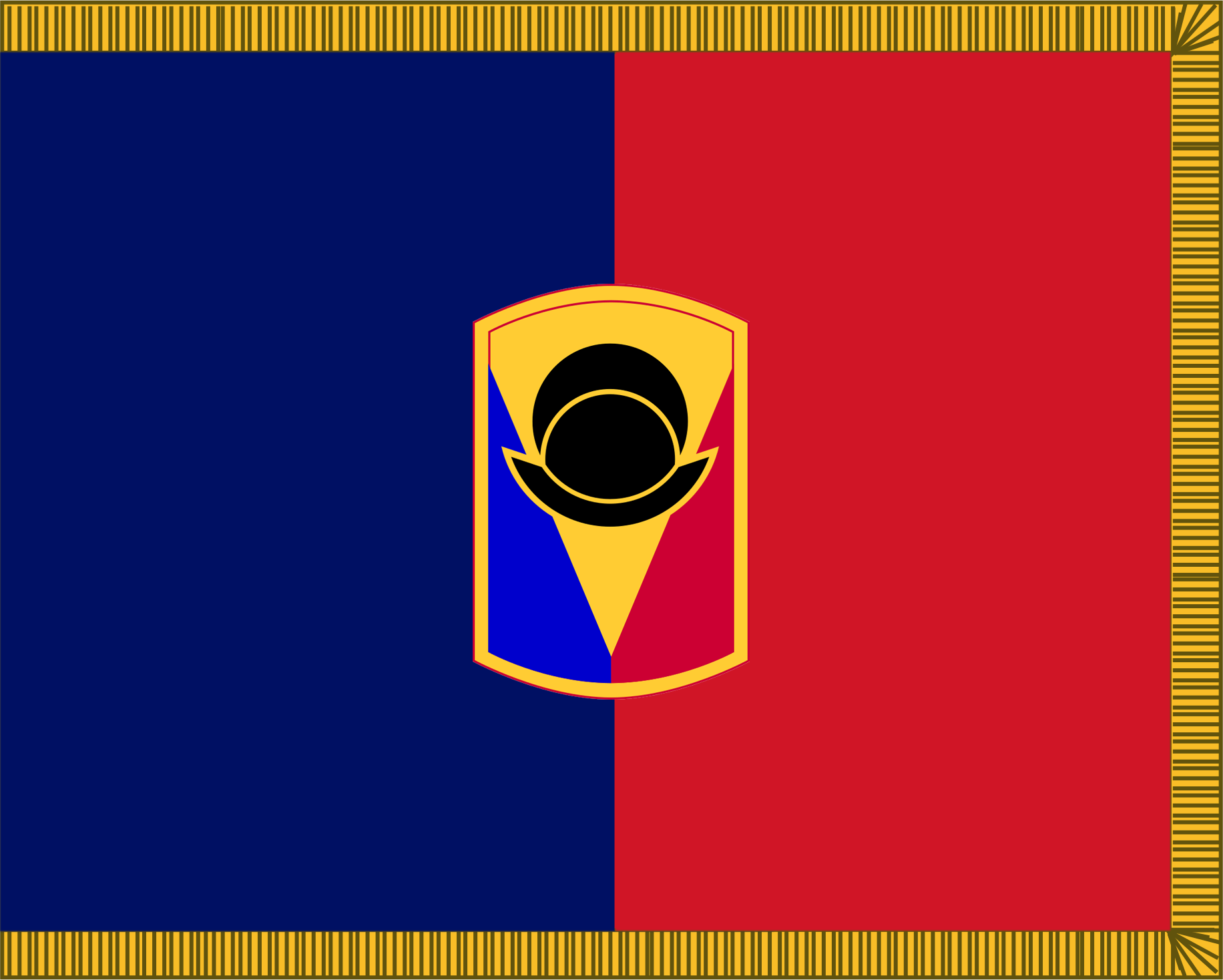
- 53rd Infantry Brigade Combat Team Flag

The 53rd Infantry Brigade Combat Team is an infantry brigade combat team of the Florida Army National Guard. The 53rd Infantry Brigade is the largest National Guard unit in the state of Florida. The brigade was one of fifteen enhanced readiness brigades, designed and trained to support active duty divisions. The brigade includes 32 units in Florida and Alabama with 4,166 authorized personnel.

== History ==
At the time the United States entered World War in 1917, a brigade of the New York National Guard, the 3rd, was redesignated the 53rd Infantry Brigade. That brigade saw overseas service with the 27th Infantry Division (United States). In the mid-2020s, that brigade's heritage is carried on by the 53rd Troop Command of the New York Army National Guard (NY ARNG).

The modern 53rd Infantry Brigade carries the lineage of Battery B, 116th Field Artillery that was organized 5 December 1921 in Tampa, Florida, after serving in World War II as part of the 31st Division it was inactivated 20 December 1945 at Camp Stoneman, California. It was reorganized 15 April 1947 in Tampa as Battery B., 1st Howitzer Battalion, 116th Artillery.

=== Cold War and 1990s ===
The 53rd Infantry Brigade (Separate) was formed in 1963; redesignated as an armored brigade circa 1 March 1964, and then returned to being an infantry brigade 1967-68.

When the 48th Armored Division was disbanded in 1968, its units in Florida became part of the 53rd Infantry Brigade (Separate). The distinctive unit insignia was originally approved for the non-color bearing units of the 53d Armored Brigade on 9 January 1967. It was redesignated for the 53d Infantry Brigade on 25 July 1968.

The brigade participated in hurricane relief operations in 1992 in response to Hurricane Andrew whereby the brigade was deployed for nearly two months to Miami.

The Florida Army National Guard 53rd Infantry Brigade was the first of fifteen Army National Guard enhanced readiness brigades to rotate through the Joint Readiness Training Center (JRTC) at Fort Polk, Louisiana, 10–26 June 1995. Participating in the training were 65 per cent of the Florida Army National Guard. A convoy of 1,000 vehicles traveled from Miami to Panama City, Florida to be loaded on barges and shipped to Fort Polk for the National Guard Brigade training. The brigade also has a training relationship with the 82nd Airborne Division.

The U.S. Army has since eliminated the "Enhanced Brigade" program of directly augmenting active duty combat arms units with Army National Guard units.

=== War on Terror (2001 - 2021) ===
==== Iraq 2003 ====
The brigade's three infantry battalions were activated in late December 2002 and sent to Fort Stewart, Georgia for training. 1st, 2nd, and 3rd Battalions deployed to the Persian Gulf in support of Operation Iraqi Freedom, and assumed a physical security mission in Kuwait and on the Jordan-Iraq border.

===== 1st Battalion, 124th Infantry =====
Following thirty-eight days of pre-mobilization training at Fort Stewart, GA, the Miami-based 1st Battalion, 124th Infantry Regiment, under the command of Lieutenant Colonel Hector Mirable deployed to Jordan where it initially served as the security force at Prince Hassan Air Base, a forward operating base for U.S. Special Operations Forces and A-10 Thunderbolt II attack aircraft of the United States Air Force.

In late April 2003, the battalion was attached to the 3rd Armored Cavalry Regiment and deployed into Iraq by air and ground assault convoy. After consolidation at Al Asad Air Base, Iraq, it moved to Ar Ramadi, the provincial capital of Al Anbar Province, where it was assigned an area of operation consisting of approximately 2,400 square kilometers and more than 350,000 Sunni Iraqi inhabitants.

While there, they provided local security and assisted in the reestablishment of the Iraqi Police and Ministerial Guard forces. The unit also conducted cordon and search operations. During one of these sweeps through the outskirts of Ar Ramadi on 20 August 2003, members of the 1–124 Infantry captured Salem Musa Ijly. Also known as Abu Inas, Ijly was a Jordanian national and member of al-Qaeda, who was facilitating weapons smuggling through Iraq into Jordan and maintaining weapons stockpiles in Ar Ramadi. He was also linked to a plot to assassinate King Abdullah II of Jordan.

During its deployment, the battalion captured 511 enemy combatants; recovered 2,399 small arms, 221 mortar tubes, 4,258 mortar round and 43 RPG launchers; captured, defused or engaged 715 improvised explosive devices; processed 7,422 detainees; and, disbursed more than $1.3 million in aid for repair or construction of numerous buildings, to include two hospitals, 67 schools and 52 mosques.

The 1–124 Infantry received the Valorous Unit Award for extraordinary heroism in operations. Soldiers of the unit were presented 65 Bronze Stars (two with "V" device), 379 Army Commendation Medals (13 with "V" device), and 63 Purple Hearts. Despite serving 291 continuous days in combat operations, the unit brought home every Soldier who deployed with it.

===== 2nd Battalion, 124th Infantry =====
The Orlando-based 2nd Battalion, 124th Infantry Regiment, deployed along the southern Iraq border and a 20-man detachment from Charlie Company, 2–124th was the first coalition unit into Iraq, providing security and quick-reaction force for Special Forces. During their brief stay at the Jordanian Air Base, the unit conducted security operations, physical fitness training, and honed their combat skills.

===== 3rd Battalion, 124th Infantry =====
The northern-Florida based 3rd Battalion, 124th Infantry Regiment, provided security and reconnaissance support to the air defense artillery elements supporting I MEF and TF Tarawa during the initial invasion, though initially only companies Alpha and Charlie deployed. Elements engaged in combat operations near Nasiriyah and Salman Pak. Subsequently, they were reassigned first to 3rd Infantry Division and later 1st Armored Division, where they were rejoined by the rest of the battalion, to provide security and stabilization operations in downtown Baghdad's Adhamiya and al-Mansour administrative districts. During this time, elements of the battalion conducted QRF operations with ODAs from 19th Special Forces Group. Despite taking some casualties from IEDs and hostile fire, the battalion rotated back to the United States and demobilized in 2004.

==== Afghanistan 2005–2006 and Iraq 2006–2007 ====
In 2005, more than 2,400 soldiers from the 53rd Infantry Brigade deployed to Afghanistan as part of the international coalition's Joint Task Force Phoenix, where they helped train the Afghan National Army. During their deployment, the task force saw eleven Afghan kandaks (battalions) graduate from Kabul Military Training Center, adding more than 7,000 soldiers to the Afghan National Army.

In June 2006, Delta Company, 2nd Battalion, 124th Infantry deployed to Mosul, Iraq for a one-year tour conducting stability operations and combat patrols. The unit worked in conjunction with elements of the 25th Infantry Division, United States Special Forces, and Company H, 121st LRRS.

In late 2005, the 3rd Battalion, 124th Infantry began preparing for conversion to a cavalry squadron to serve as the brigade's Reconnaissance Surveillance and Target Acquisition (RSTA) squadron; this was completed in 2007 and they were redesignated 1st Squadron, 153rd Cavalry.

==== Kuwait and Iraq 2010 ====
In January 2010, the 53rd Infantry Brigade was activated for service in Kuwait and Iraq in support of Operation Iraqi Freedom. The brigade mobilized at Fort Hood, Texas, and beginning in late February, began deploying to Kuwait. Although originally scheduled for deployment to Afghanistan in 2009, in 2008, the brigade learned that their mission had shifted from Infantry operations in Afghanistan to convoy security in Iraq.

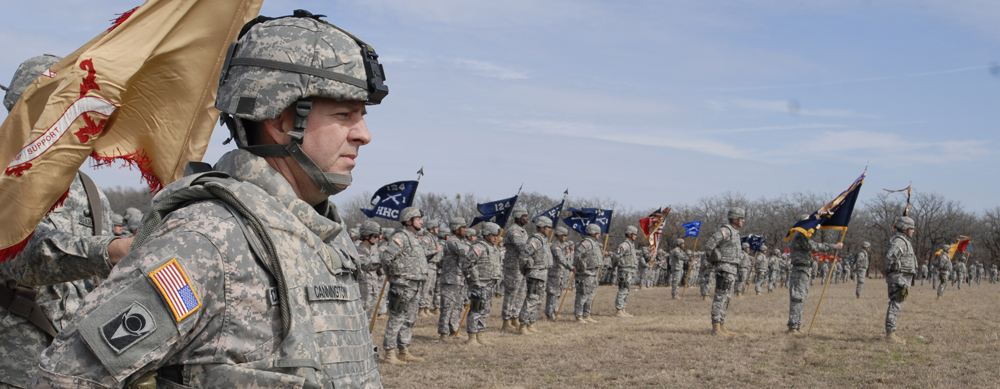
The 53rd IBCT standing in formation just before deployment to Kuwait and Iraq

The brigade's primary mission was to provide convoy security for logistical convoys moving in and out of Iraq. The 1st Battalion, 124th Infantry – the Hurricane Battalion – conducted medium and long haul missions from their base in Camp Buehring, Kuwait, while the 2nd Battalion, 124th Infantry – the Seminole Battalion – conducted short haul missions from their base in Camp Virginia, Kuwait. The 1st Squadron, 153rd Cavalry "Darkhorse" conducted security force missions in Northern Kuwait at Camps Buehring and Virginia as well as at Khabari Crossing in Kuwait. Bravo Troop, 1–153rd Cavalry was stationed at Camp As-Sayliyah, Qatar. The brigade headquarters element conducted administrative operations from Camp Arifjan, Kuwait.

In a ceremony on 5 November 2016, the 1st Battalion, 167th Infantry Regiment of the Alabama Army National Guard was re-patched to denote its attachment to the 53rd IBCT.

=== 2020 and beyond ===
Soldiers assigned to Task Force Seminole, 53rd Infantry Brigade Combat Team, Florida Army National Guard, conduct a mortar fire mission in the Horn of Africa, Sept. 24, 2026.

In November 2021, 160 soldiers of the 53rd IBCT, to include the brigade commander, were mobilized to active duty under Title 10 USC orders and forward deployed to Ukraine to advise and mentor Ukrainian military forces as part of Joint Multinational Training Group - Ukraine. In this capacity, the 53rd IBCT element was named Task Force Gator. In early February 2022, just prior to the 2022 Russian invasion of Ukraine, the 53rd IBCT element was ordered out of Ukraine by Secretary of Defense Lloyd Austin and repositioned elsewhere in Western Europe, continuing a training mission with NATO partner nations. In August 2022, the Task Force Gator element of the 53rd IBCT returned home to Florida and demobilized back to traditional National Guard status.

== Organization 2025 ==
The 53rd Infantry Brigade Combat Team is headquartered at the C.W. "Bill" Young Armed Forces Reserve Center in Pinellas Park in Florida. It has eight battalion-sized units located in Florida and Alabama. These include a cavalry squadron, three infantry battalions, a field artillery battalion, a brigade engineer battalion and a brigade support battalion. These Battalions are:

- 53rd Infantry Brigade Combat Team, in Pinellas Park
  - Headquarters and Headquarters Company, 53rd Infantry Brigade Combat Team, in Pinellas Park
  - 1st Squadron, 153rd Cavalry Regiment, in Panama City
    - Headquarters and Headquarters Troop, 1st Squadron, 153rd Cavalry Regiment, in Panama City
    - Troop A, 1st Squadron, 153rd Cavalry Regiment, in Bonifay
    - Troop B, 1st Squadron, 153rd Cavalry Regiment, in Pensacola
    - Troop C (Dismounted), 1st Squadron, 153rd Cavalry Regiment, in Tallahassee
  - 1st Battalion, 124th Infantry Regiment, in Miramar
    - Headquarters and Headquarters Company, 1st Battalion, 124th Infantry Regiment, in Miramar
    - Company A, 1st Battalion, 124th Infantry Regiment, in Fort Pierce
    - Company B, 1st Battalion, 124th Infantry Regiment, in Cocoa
    - Company C, 1st Battalion, 124th Infantry Regiment, in Miami
    - Company D (Weapons), 1st Battalion, 124th Infantry Regiment, in West Palm Beach
  - 2nd Battalion, 124th Infantry Regiment, in Orlando
    - Headquarters and Headquarters Company, 2nd Battalion, 124th Infantry Regiment, in Orlando
    - Company A, 2nd Battalion, 124th Infantry Regiment, in Leesburg
    - Company B, 2nd Battalion, 124th Infantry Regiment, in Sanford
    - Company C, 2nd Battalion, 124th Infantry Regiment, in Ocala
    - Company D (Weapons), 2nd Battalion, 124th Infantry Regiment, in Eustis
  - 1st Battalion, 167th Infantry Regiment, in Talladega (AL) (Alabama Army National Guard)
    - Headquarters and Headquarters Company, 1st Battalion, 167th Infantry Regiment, in Talladega (AL)
    - Company A, 1st Battalion, 167th Infantry Regiment, in Tuscaloosa (AL)
    - Company B, 1st Battalion, 167th Infantry Regiment, in Pelham (AL)
    - Company C, 1st Battalion, 167th Infantry Regiment, in Cullman (AL)
    - Company D (Weapons), 1st Battalion, 167th Infantry Regiment, in Calera (AL)
  - 2nd Battalion, 116th Field Artillery Regiment, in Lakeland
    - Headquarters and Headquarters Battery, 2nd Battalion, 116th Field Artillery Regiment, in Lakeland
    - Battery A, 2nd Battalion, 116th Field Artillery Regiment, in Dade City
    - Battery B, 2nd Battalion, 116th Field Artillery Regiment, in Winter Haven
    - Battery C, 2nd Battalion, 116th Field Artillery Regiment, in Ocala
  - 753rd Brigade Engineer Battalion, in Tallahassee
    - Headquarters and Headquarters Company, 753rd Brigade Engineer Battalion, in Tallahassee
    - Company A (Combat Engineer), 753rd Brigade Engineer Battalion, in Lake City
    - Company B (Combat Engineer), 753rd Brigade Engineer Battalion, in Quincy
    - Company C (Signal), 753rd Brigade Engineer Battalion, in Pinellas Park
    - Company D (Military Intelligence), 753rd Brigade Engineer Battalion, in Pinellas Park
      - Detachment 1, Company D (Military Intelligence), 753rd Brigade Engineer Battalion, at Camp Blanding (RQ-28A UAV)
  - 53rd Brigade Support Battalion, in St. Petersburg
    - Headquarters and Headquarters Company, 53rd Brigade Support Battalion, in St. Petersburg
    - Company A (Distribution), 53rd Brigade Support Battalion, in Pinellas Park
    - Company B (Maintenance), 53rd Brigade Support Battalion, in Tampa
    - Company C (Medical), 53rd Brigade Support Battalion, in Pinellas Park
    - Company D (Forward Support), 53rd Brigade Support Battalion, in Chipley — attached to 1st Squadron, 153rd Cavalry Regiment
    - Company E (Forward Support), 53rd Brigade Support Battalion, in Quincy — attached to 753rd Brigade Engineer Battalion
    - Company F (Forward Support), 53rd Brigade Support Battalion, in Bartow — attached to 2nd Battalion, 116th Field Artillery Regiment
    - Company G (Forward Support), 53rd Brigade Support Battalion, in Miramar — attached to 1st Battalion, 124th Infantry Regiment
    - Company H (Forward Support), 53rd Brigade Support Battalion, in Haines City — attached to 2nd Battalion, 124th Infantry Regiment
    - Company I (Forward Support), 53rd Brigade Support Battalion, in Oxford (AL) — attached to 1st Battalion, 167th Infantry Regiment (Alabama Army National Guard)
