= Florida Army National Guard =

Component of the US Army and military of the state of Florida

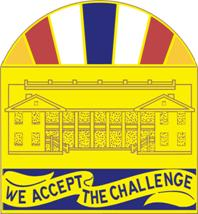
- Florida Army National Guard DUI
- Country: United States
- Allegiance: Florida
- Branch: United States Army National Guard
- Type: ARNG Headquarters Command
- Role: Military reserve force
- Part of: Florida National Guard
- Garrison/HQ: St. Augustine, Florida
- Motto: "We Accept the Challenge"

Commanders
- Current commander: Major General John D. Haas
- Deputy Commanding General: Major General Robert G. Carruthers, III
- Chief of Staff: Colonel Felix A. Rodriguez Jr.
- Command Chief Warrant Officer: Chief Warrant Officer 5 Robert (Rob) W. Gibson Sr.
- Command Sergeant Major - Army: Command Sergeant Major Jasen A. Pask

Insignia
- Florida National Guard Crest

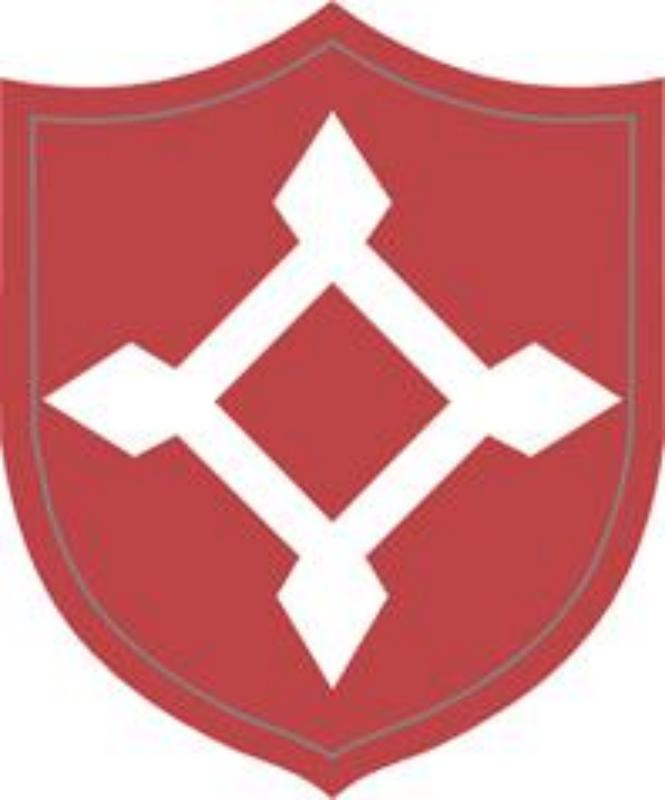
- Florida ARNG Headquarters SSI

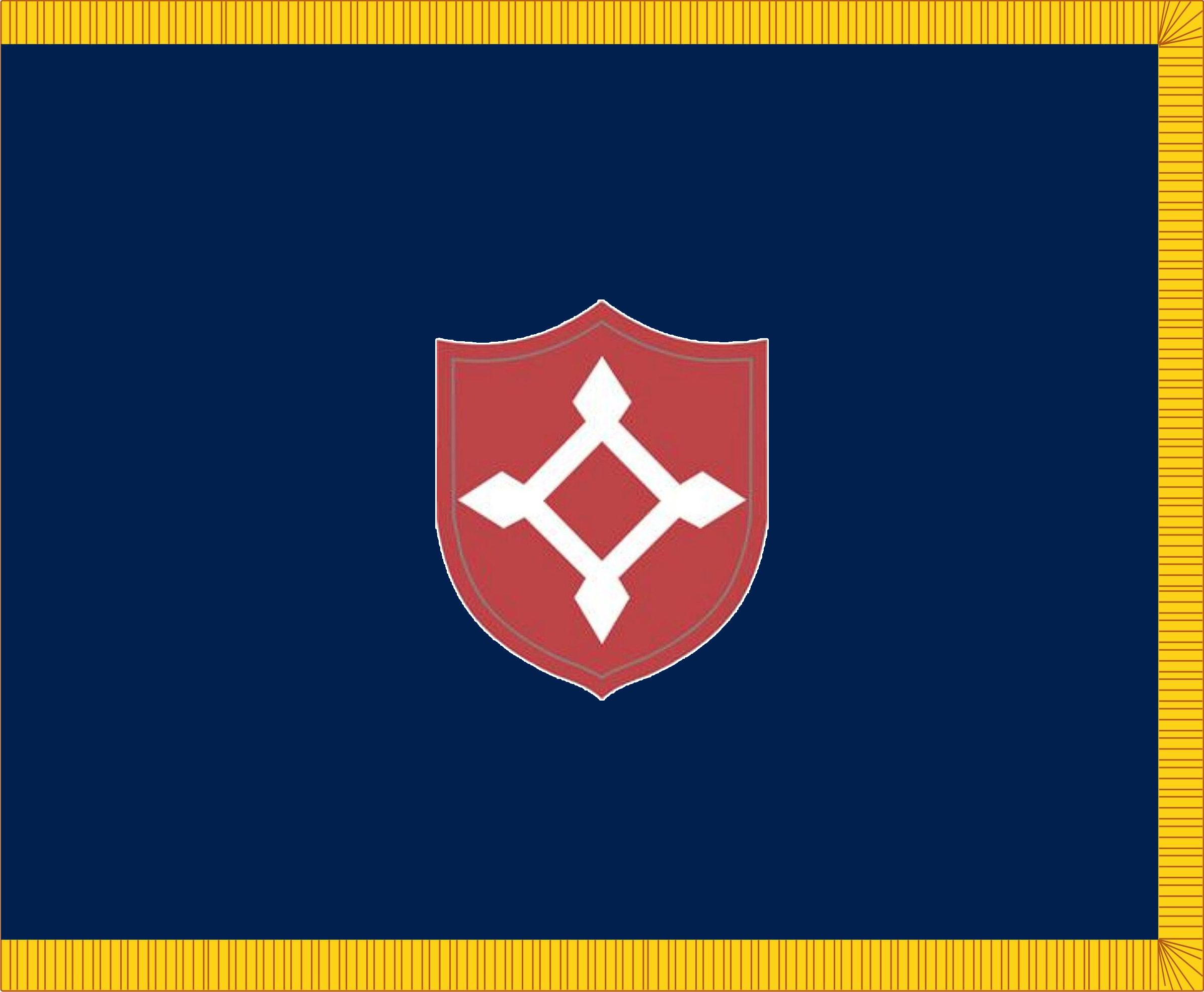
- Flag of Florida ARNG Headquarters

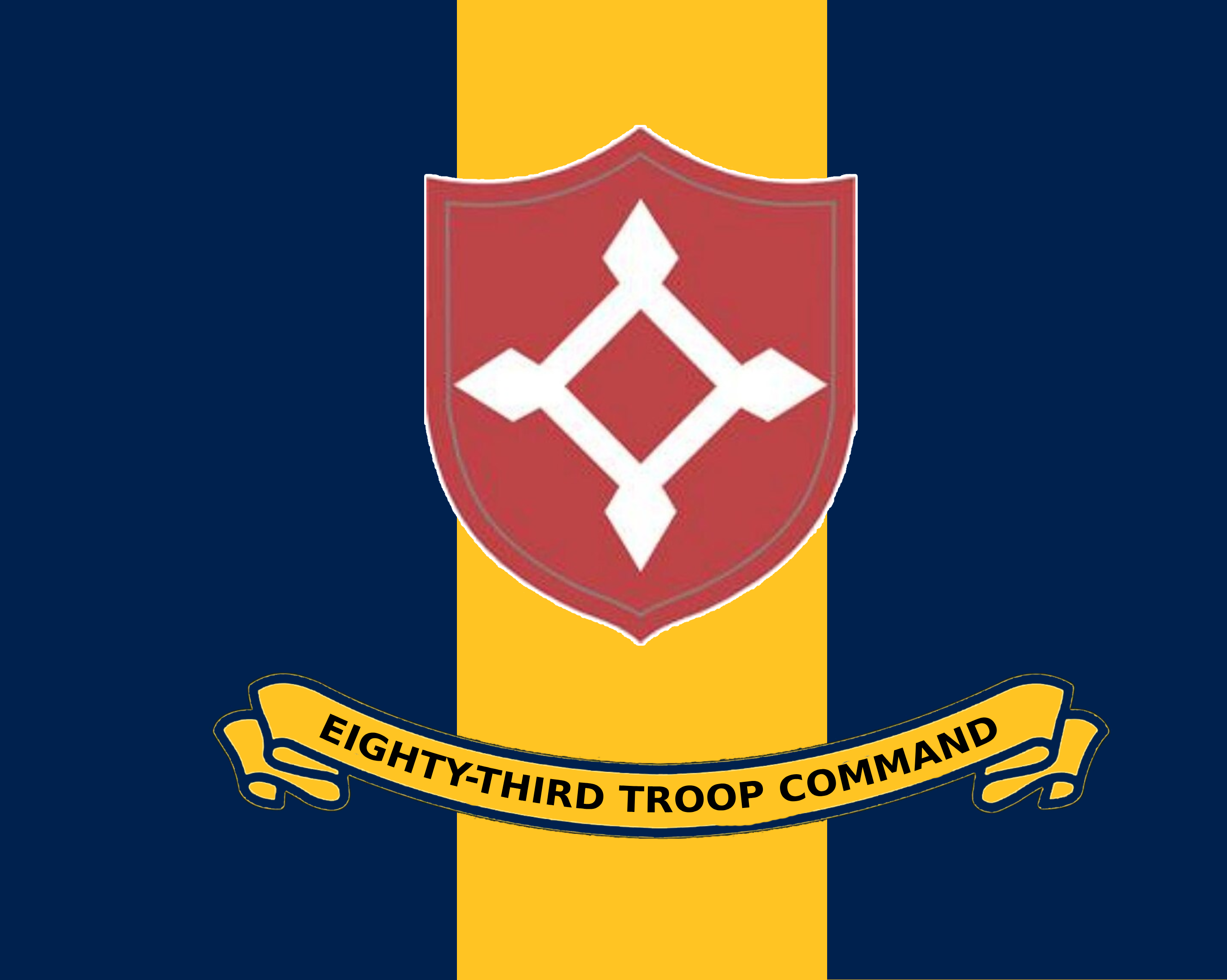
- Flag of Florida ARNG 83rd Troop Command

The Florida Army National Guard is Florida's component of the United States Army and the United States National Guard. In the United States, the Army National Guard comprises approximately one half of the federal army's available combat forces and approximately one third of its support organization. Federal coordination of various state National Guard units are maintained through the National Guard Bureau. The Florida Army National Guard was composed of approximately 10,000 soldiers (as of March 2009). The main state training grounds is Camp Blanding.

Florida Army National Guard units are trained and equipped as part of the United States Army. The same enlisted ranks and officer ranks and insignia used by the United States Army are used by Army National Guardsmen and the latter are eligible to receive all United States military awards. The Florida National Guard also bestows a number of state awards for local services rendered in or to the state of Florida.

== History ==
The predecessor of the Florida Army National Guard was a Spanish Florida militia formed in 1565 in the newly established presidio town of St. Augustine. On September 20, 1565, Spanish admiral and Florida's first governor, Pedro Menéndez de Avilés, attacked and defended Florida from an attempted French settlement at Fort Caroline, in what is now Jacksonville. The subsequent Florida militia served with the Spanish crown for 236 years, Great Britain for a 20 years, and the Confederate States of America for 5 years.

In 1702–1704, an inter-Indian Native American conflict started as part of Queen Anne's War involving the English armies on one side and the Spanish on another resulted in the Apalachee massacre. The conflict later also escalated into the Yamasee War. After the end of the First Seminole War in 1821, the Florida provinces joined the United States, a process finalized in the ratification of the Adams–Onís Treaty. From 1835 to 1842 the Second Seminole War resulted in the killing or elimination by force of most of the Native Americans from the territory. Florida was incorporated into the United States as a state in 1845. After Florida's incorporation into the United States problems with Seminoles continued until almost 1860.

Some of the immediate origins of the Florida ARNG today can be traced to the Florida State Troops. Today's 124th Infantry Regiment was reorganized and established in the Florida State Troops as five battalions between 1888 and 1892.

The Militia Act of 1903 organized the various state militias into the present National Guard system. The Florida ARNG included elements of the 51st Infantry Division from 11 September 1946 to 1963 and was originally headquartered at the Fort Homer Hesterly Armory in Tampa, Florida. The Florida ARNG also included the 48th Armored Division from 1954 to 1968.

The Florida Army National Guard Field Grade Officer Selection Board was established in October 1963. The board was composed of the Deputy Commander, 55th Command Headquarters, Divisional, as president; the Commanding General, 53rd Armored Brigade; the Commanding Officers of the 163rd Artillery Group, 164th Artillery Group, 260th Engineer Group, and 337th Signal Depot; and a recorder, from Headquarters, Military Department, State of Florida. At the time, the 164th Artillery Group (Air Defence) was made up of the HHB, the 120TH Signal Detachment (SRM), the 1st and 2nd All-Weather Battalions (Self-Propelled), 265th Artillery, and the 16th and 17th Detachments (Air Target).

On 3 January 1972 the 164th Artillery Group was reorganized and redesignated as the 227th Field Artillery Group. The 227th FA Group was upgraded to brigade status on 9 May 1978 and was active until 1 October 1988 when it was redesignated as Headquarters and Headquarters Company, 50th Support Group, though the 50th Support Group was inactivated in 1993. The Group is now active again as the 50th Regional Support Group.

In 1986, the 1st Battalion, 111th Aviation Regiment, was organized from pre-existing Florida ARNG aviation units at Craig Airport in Jacksonville and Lakeland Linder Regional Airport in Lakeland, the Lakeland unit relocating to Brooksville–Tampa Bay Regional Airport in Brooksville in 1999 and the Craig Airport unit relocating to Cecil Airport, the former NAS Cecil Field, in 2000.

The Florida Army National Guard was composed of approximately 9,950 soldiers in January 2001, subsequently increasing to its current size

=== Historic units ===
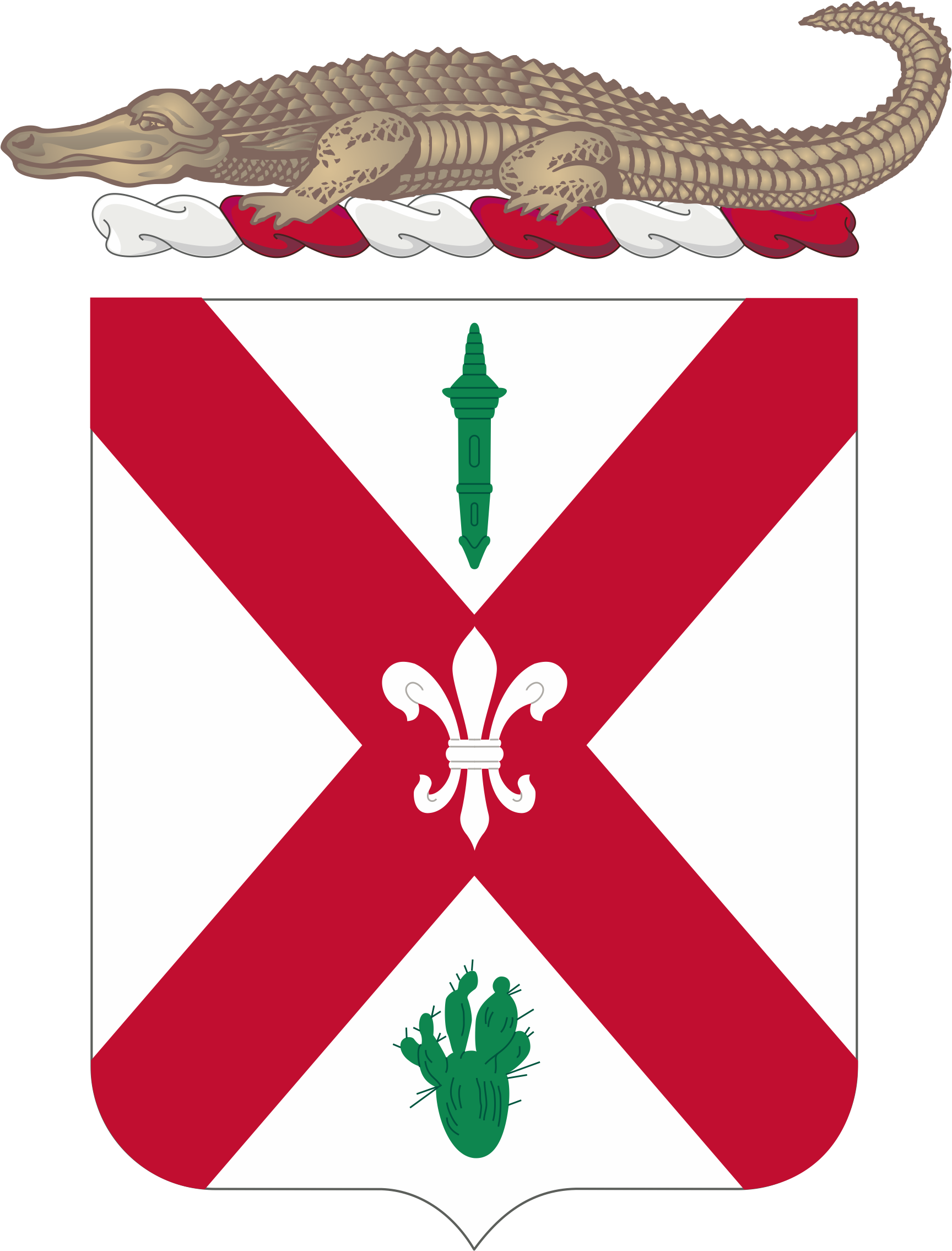
- 124th Infantry Regiment
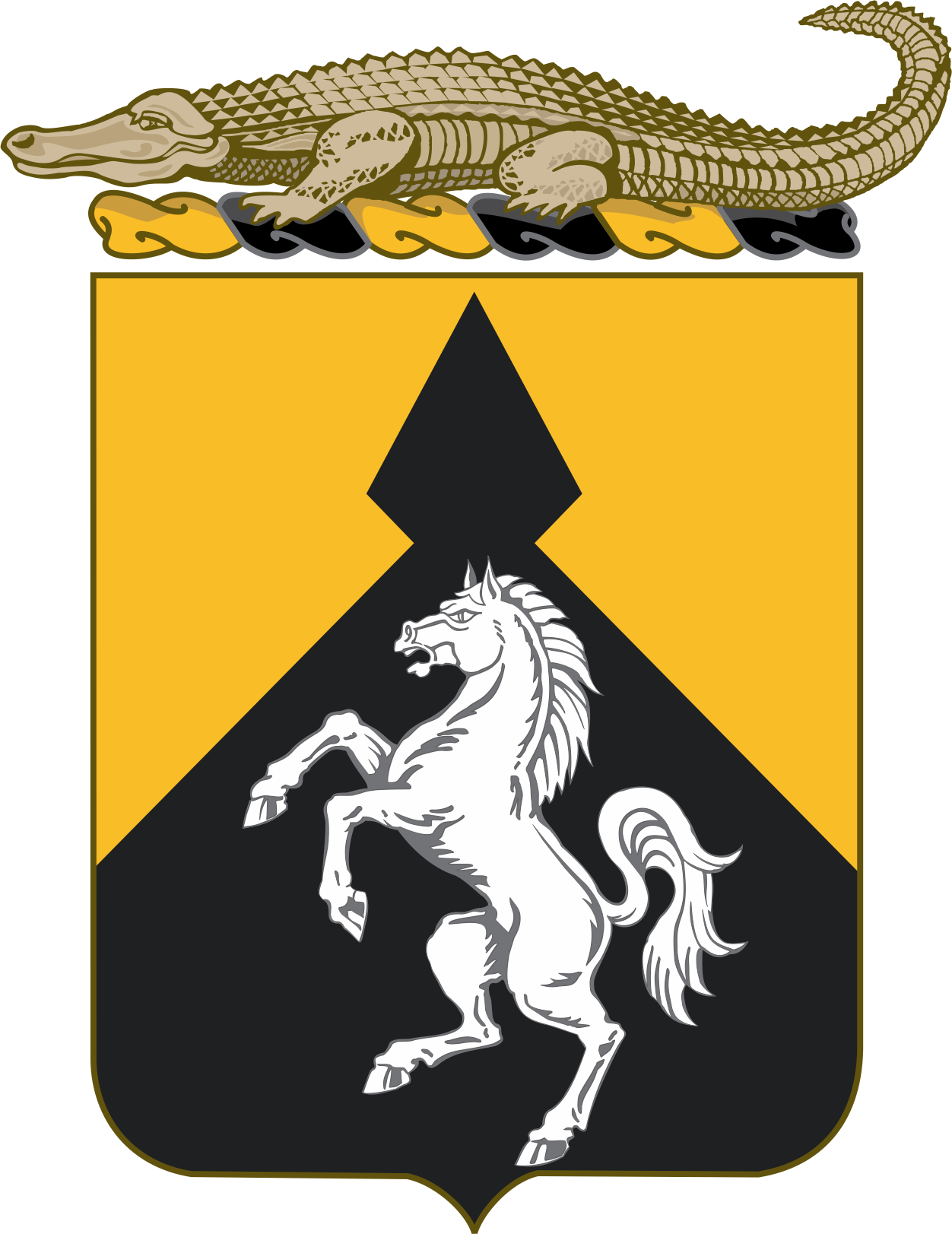
- 153rd Cavalry Regiment
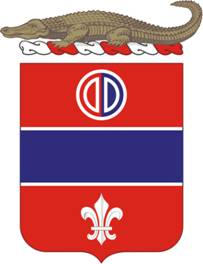
- 116th Field Artillery Regiment
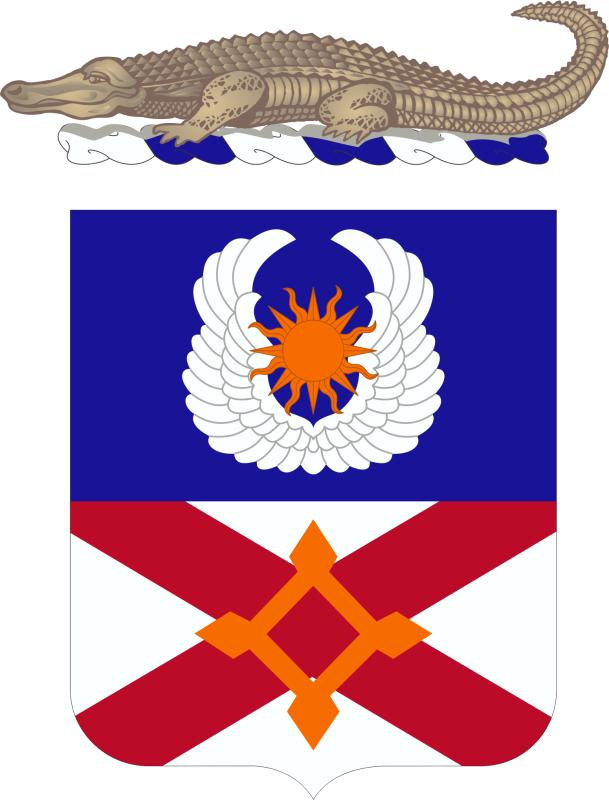
- 111th Aviation Regiment
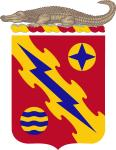
- 265th Air Defense Artillery Regiment
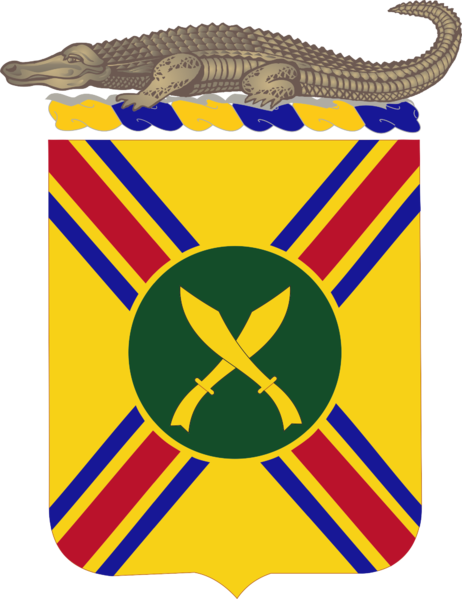
- 187th Armored Regiment

== Units ==
53rd Infantry Brigade Combat Team

- Headquarters and Headquarters Company
- 1st Battalion 167th Infantry Regiment
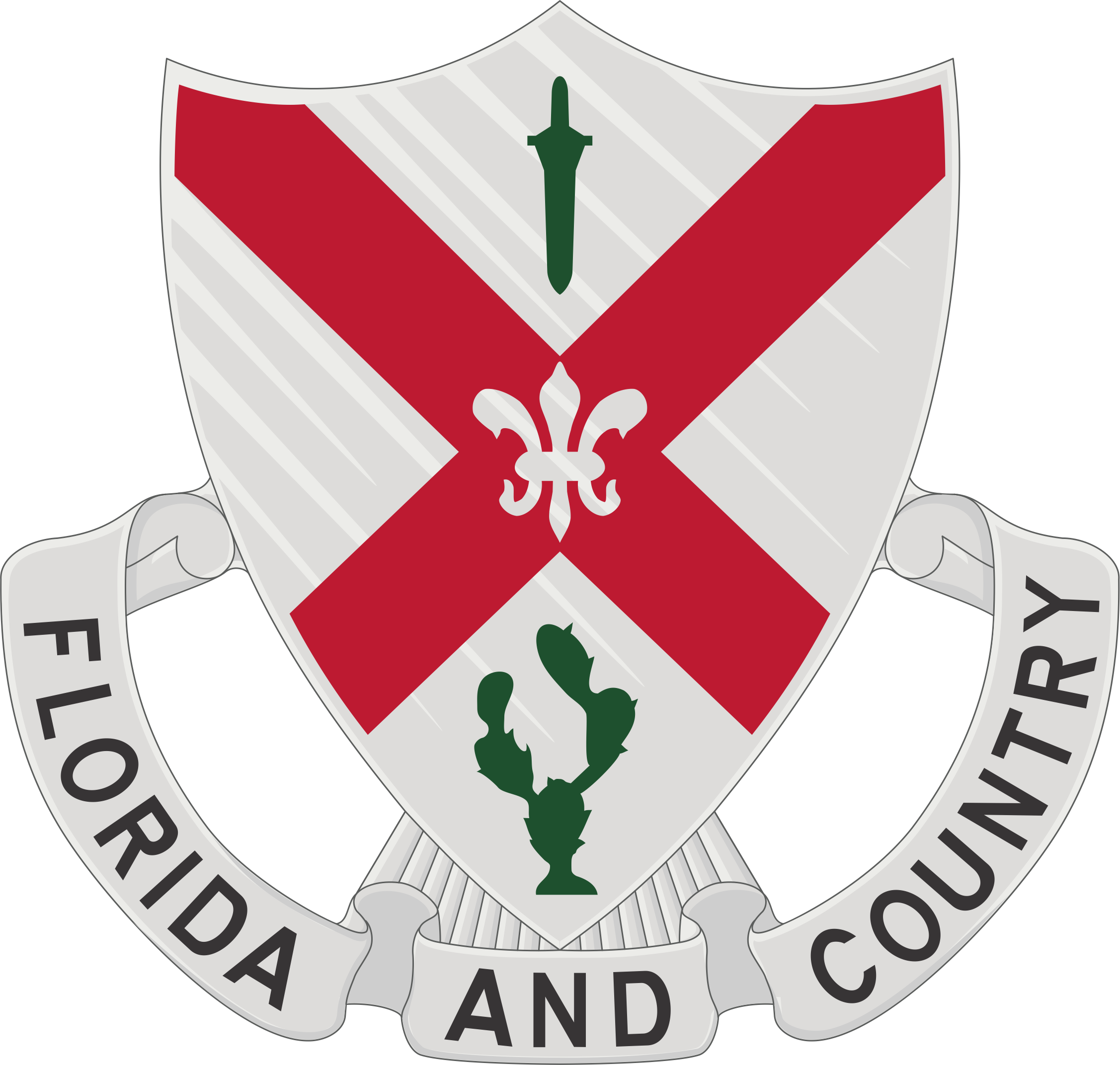
- 1st Battalion 124th Infantry Regiment
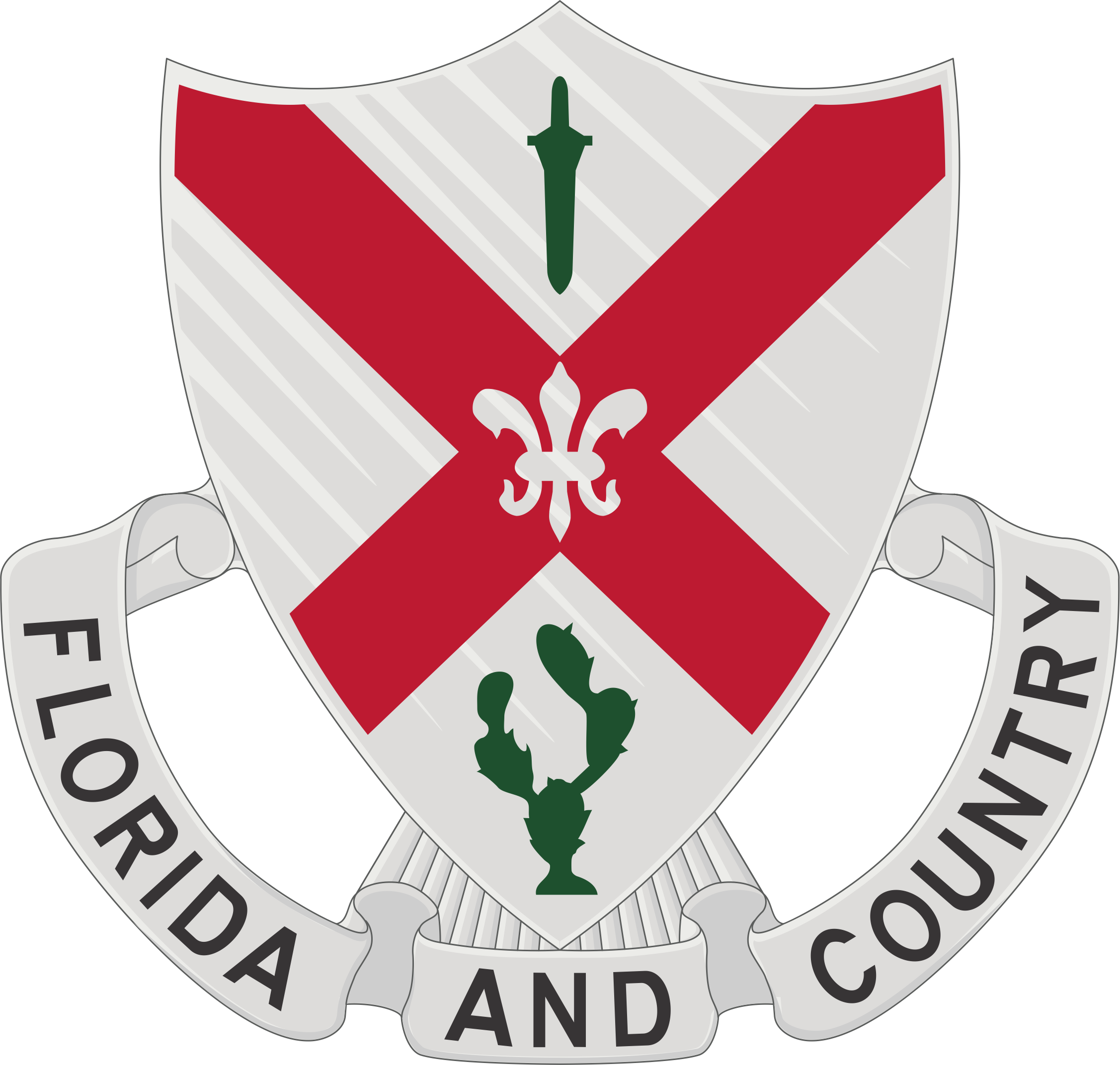
- 2nd Battalion 124th Infantry Regiment
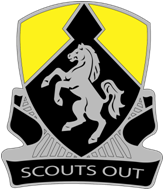
- 1st Squadron 153rd Cavalry Regiment
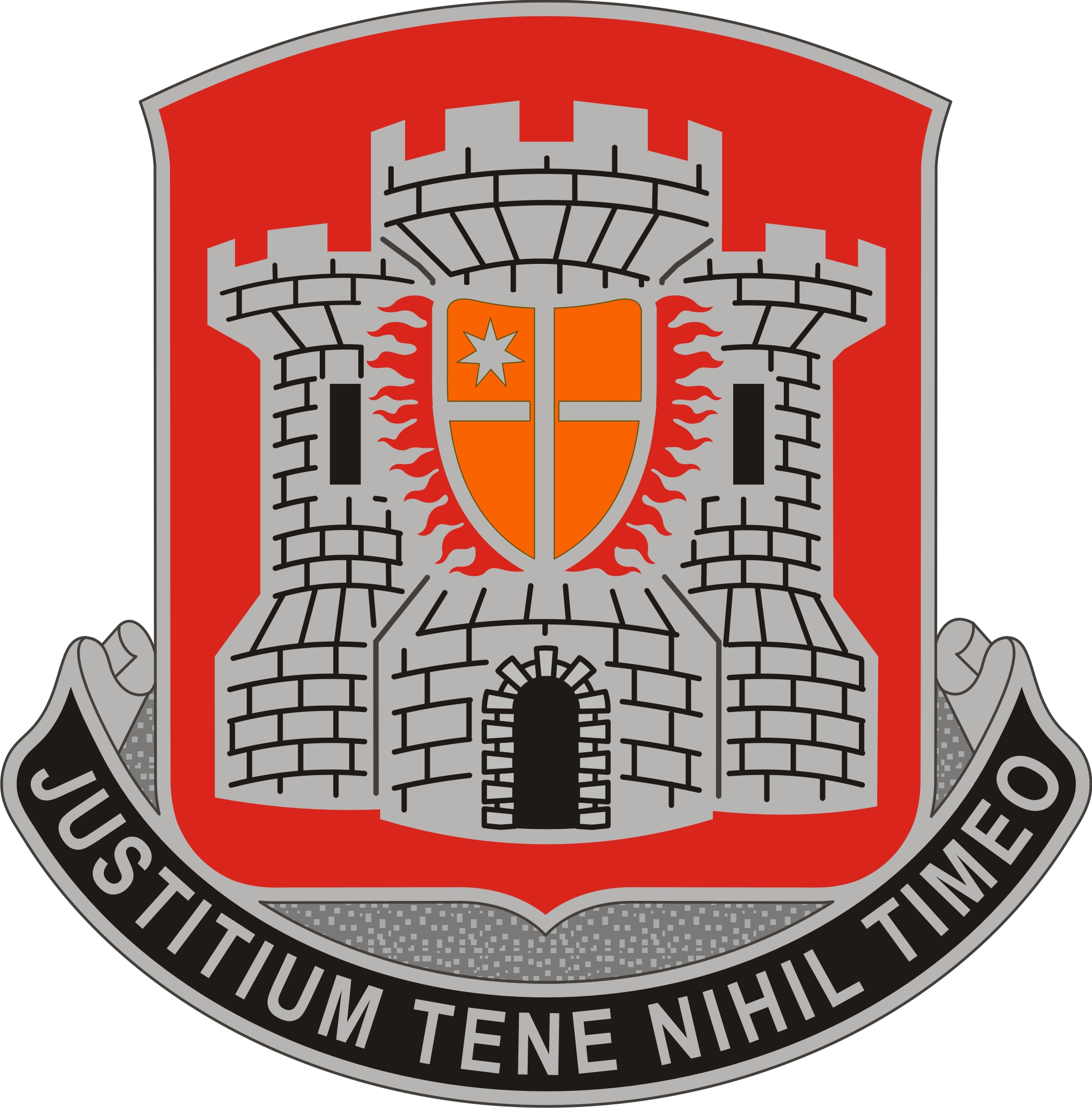
- 753rd Brigade Engineer Battalion

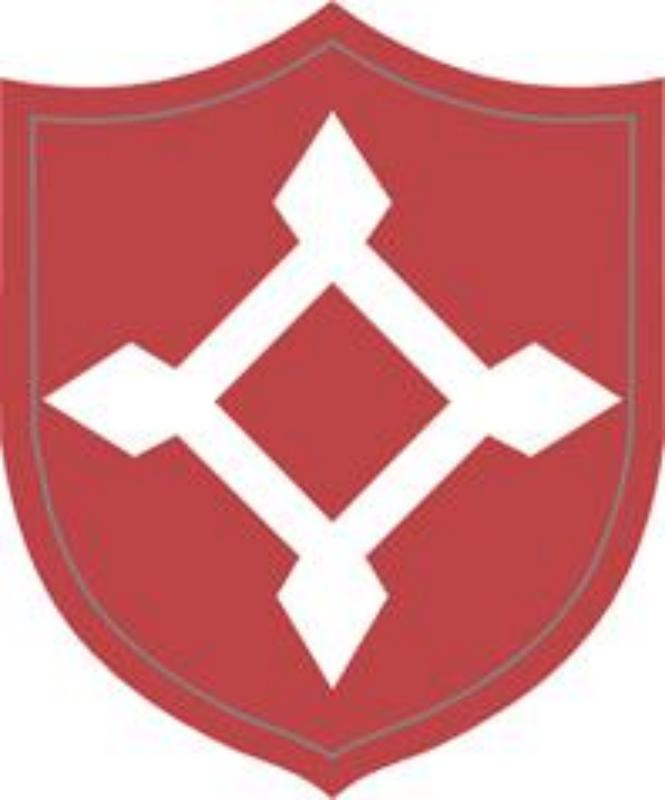
83rd Troop Command

- 3rd Battalion, 20th Special Forces Group
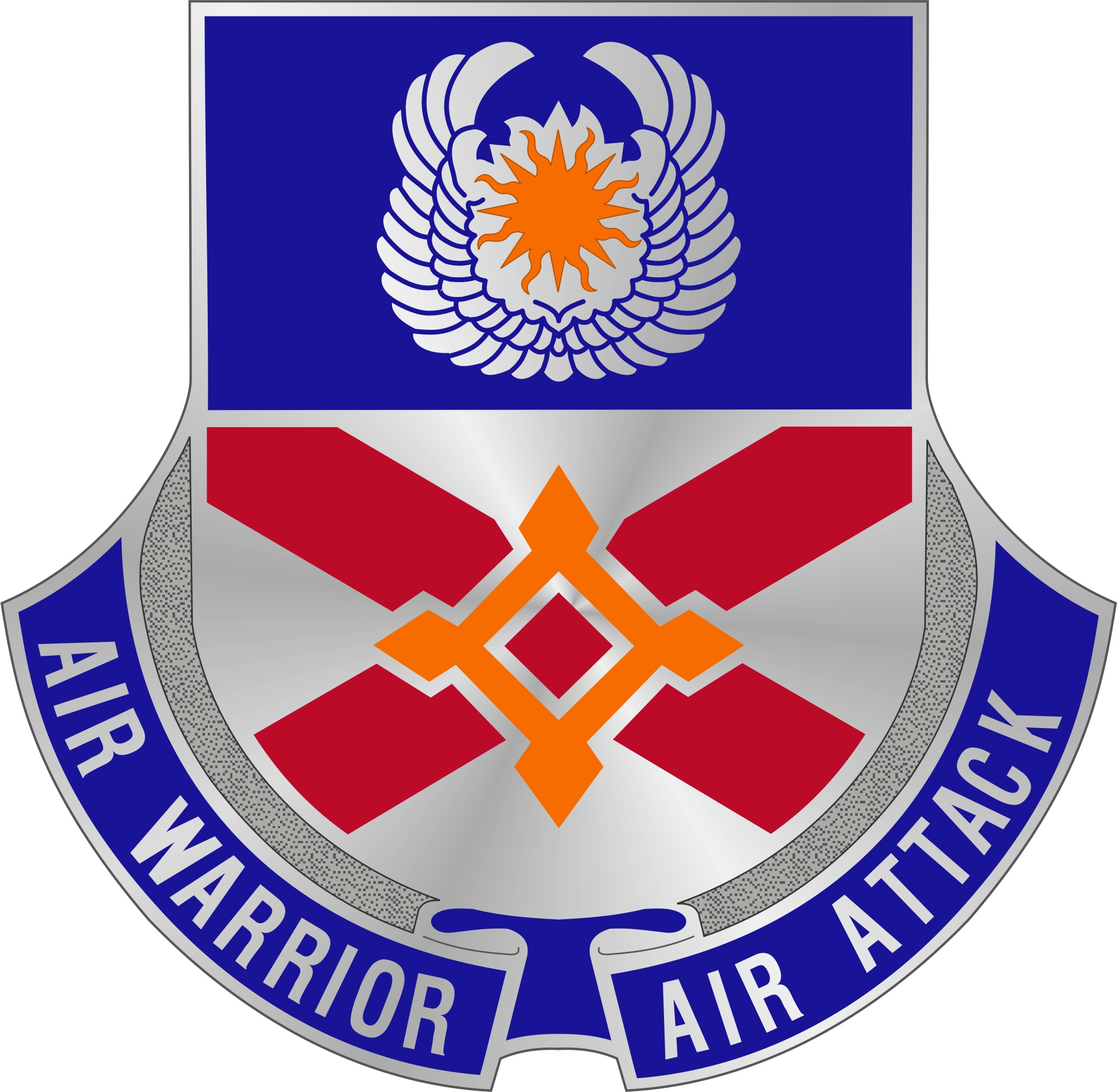
- 1st Battalion, 111th Aviation Regiment
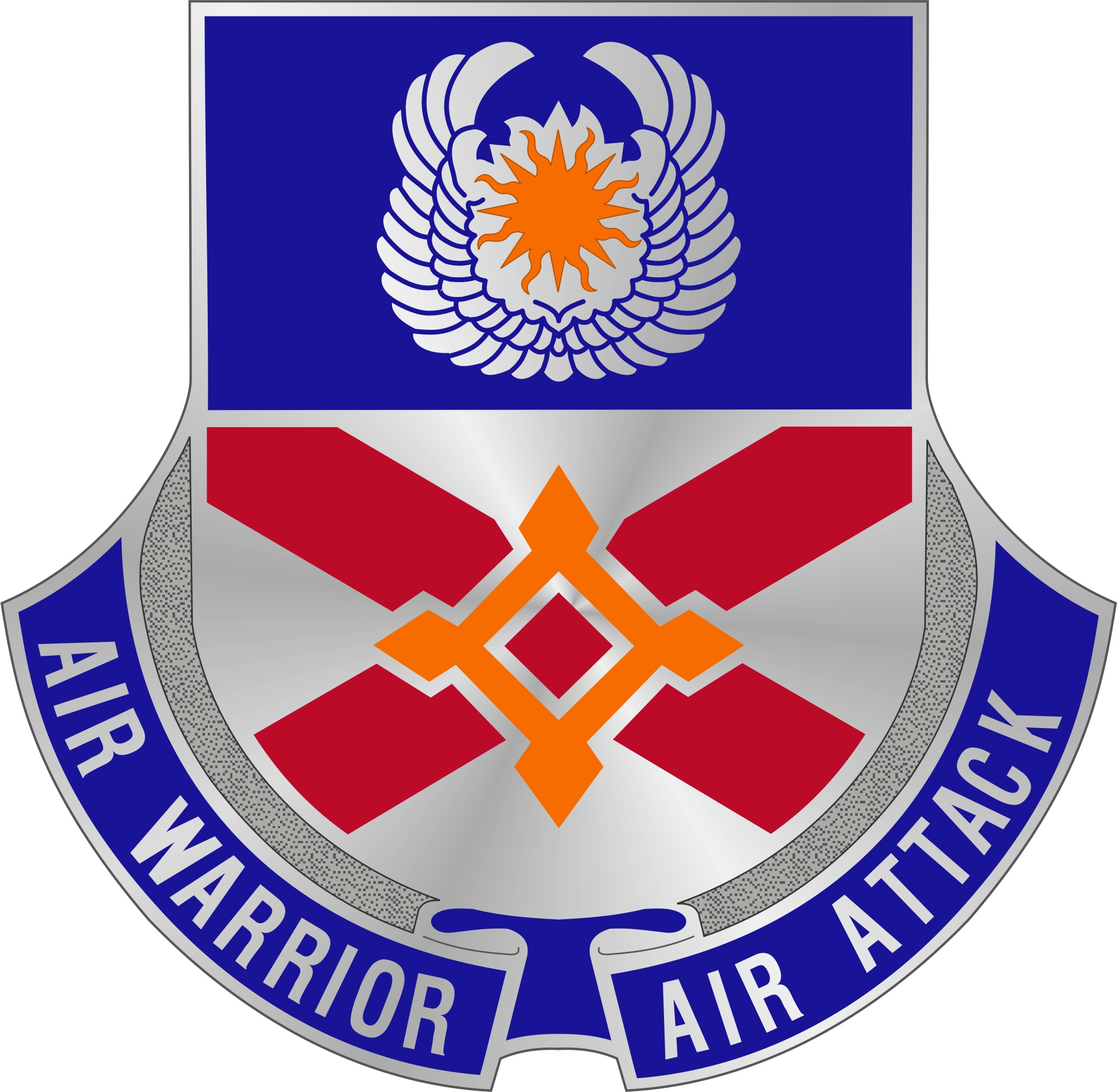
- 2nd Battalion, 111th Aviation Regiment (Airfield Operations Battalion) Returned home from a deployment in Iraq and Kuwait on May 8, 2010.
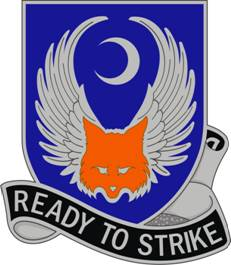
- 2nd Battalion, 151st Aviation Regiment (Support & Security/ Reconnaissance and Interdiction Detachment)
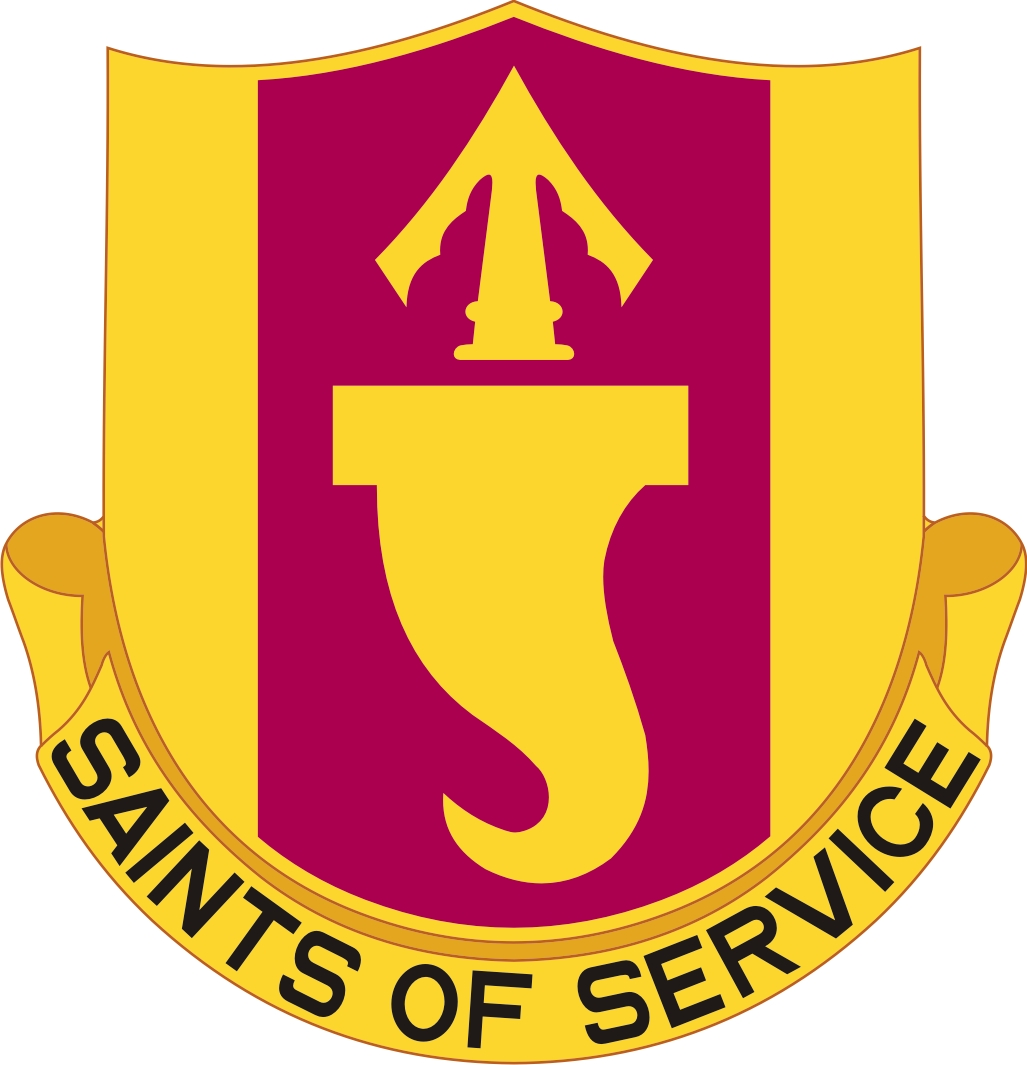
- 146th Expeditionary Signal Battalion
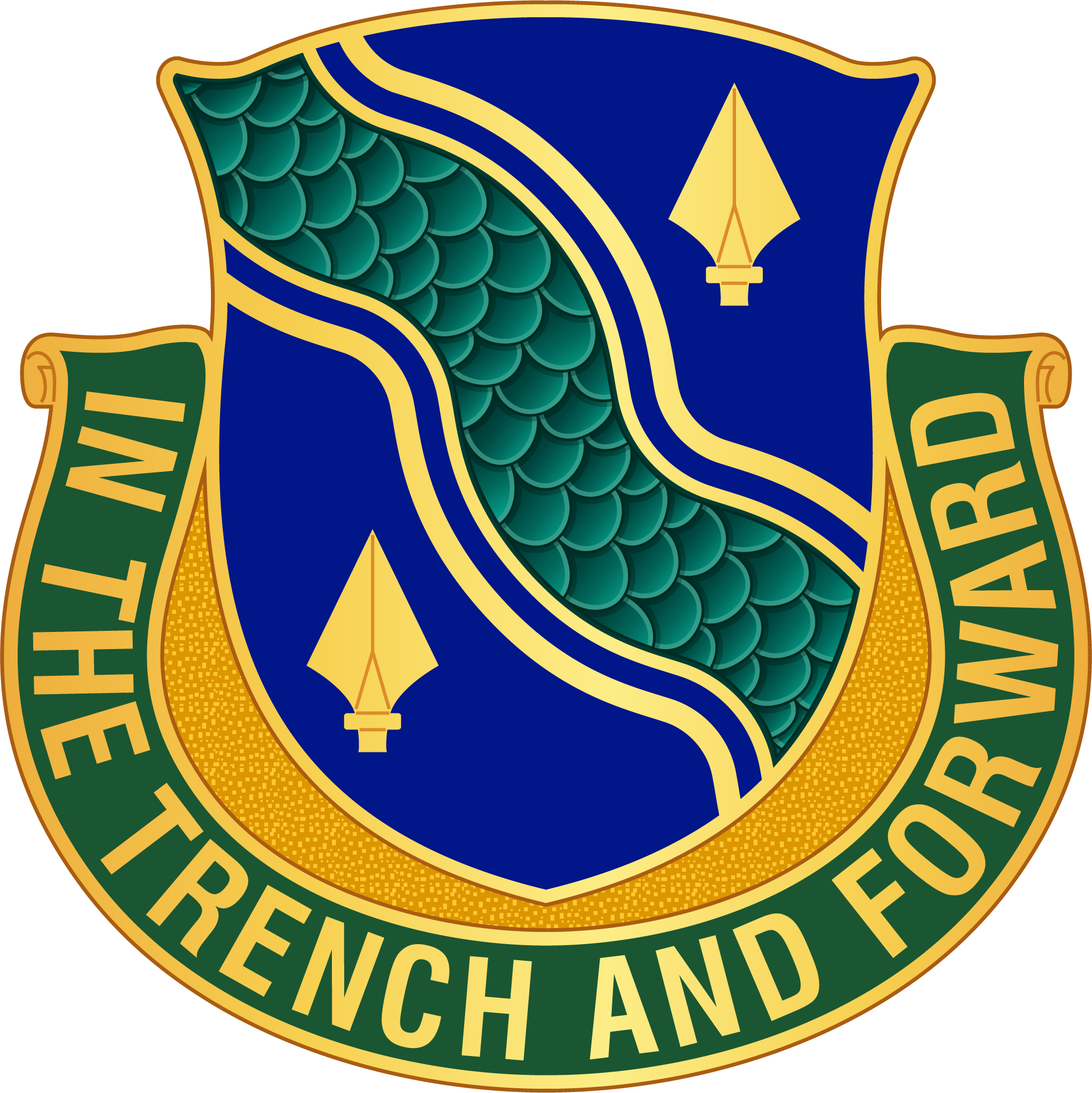
- 448th Chemical Battalion
- 870th Engineer Company
- 868th Engineer Company

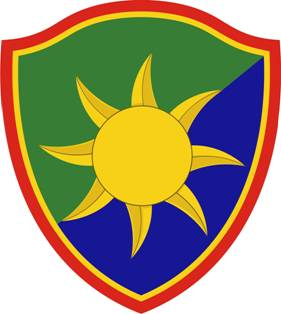

50th Regional Support Group

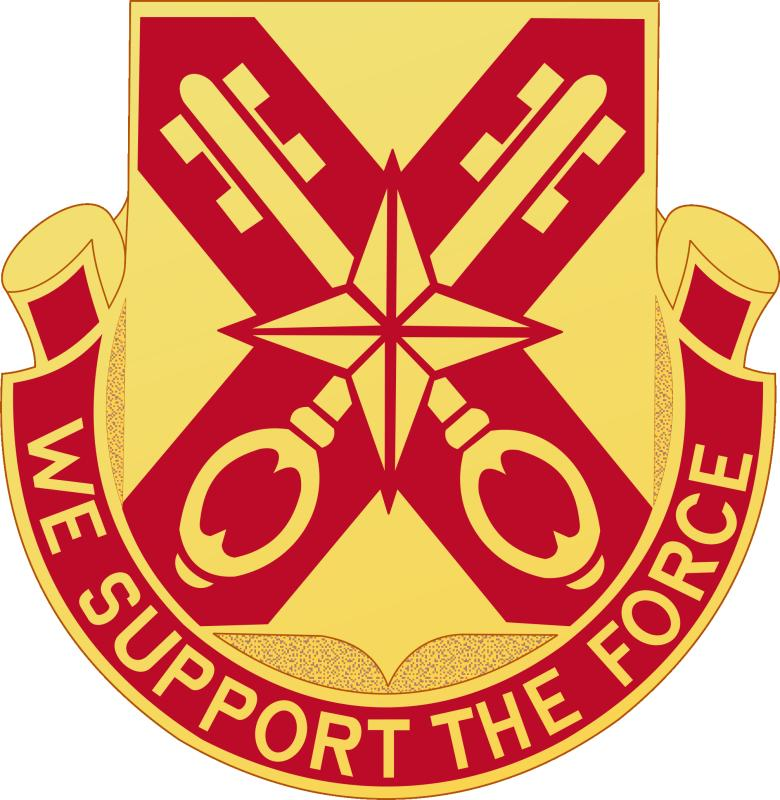
- 927th Combat Service Support Battalion
  - Headquarters and Headquarters Company
  - 631st Maintenance Company
  - 256th Medical Company
  - 144th Transportation Company
- Detachment 1, 32nd Army Air & Missile Defense Command
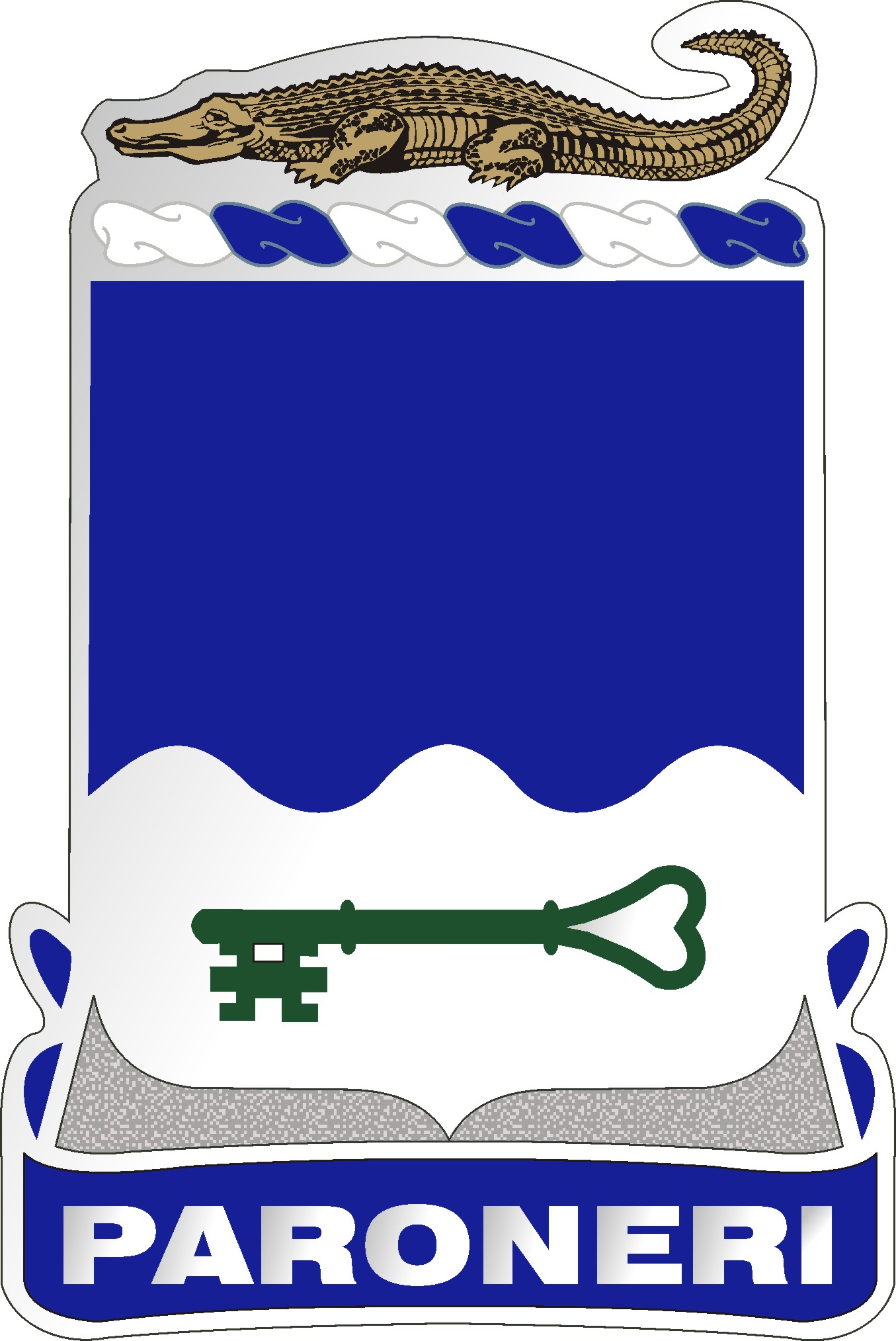
- 211th Infantry Regiment (Regional Training Institute)
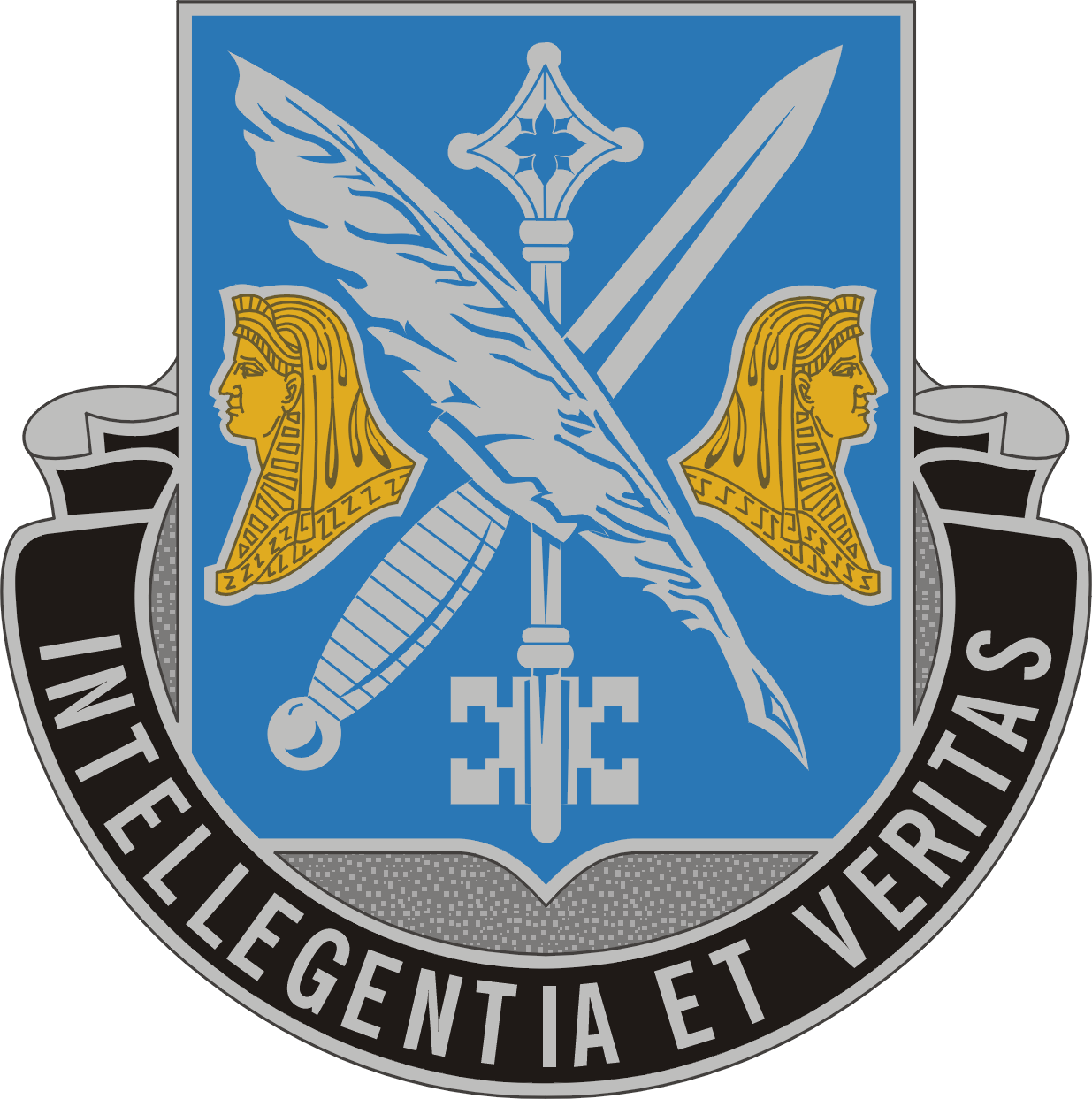
- 260th Military Intelligence Battalion (Linguist)
  - A Military Intelligence Company
  - B Military Intelligence Company
  - C Military Intelligence Company
  - 356th Quartermaster Company
  - 856th Quartermaster Company
  - 13th Army Band

164th Air Defense Artillery Brigade

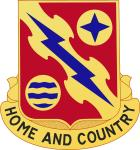
- 1st Battalion, 265th Air Defense Artillery Regiment (Avenger)
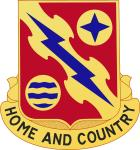
- 3rd Battalion, 265th Air Defense Artillery Regiment (Avenger)
- 3rd Battalion, 116th Field Artillery Regiment
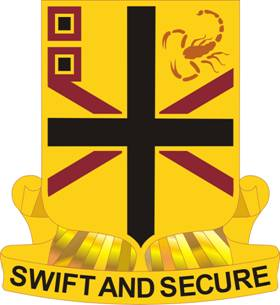
- 254th Transportation Battalion
  - Headquarters and Headquarters Detachment
  - 715th Military Police Company
  - 806th Military Police Company
  - 690th Military Police Company
  - 1218th Transportation Company (Cargo)
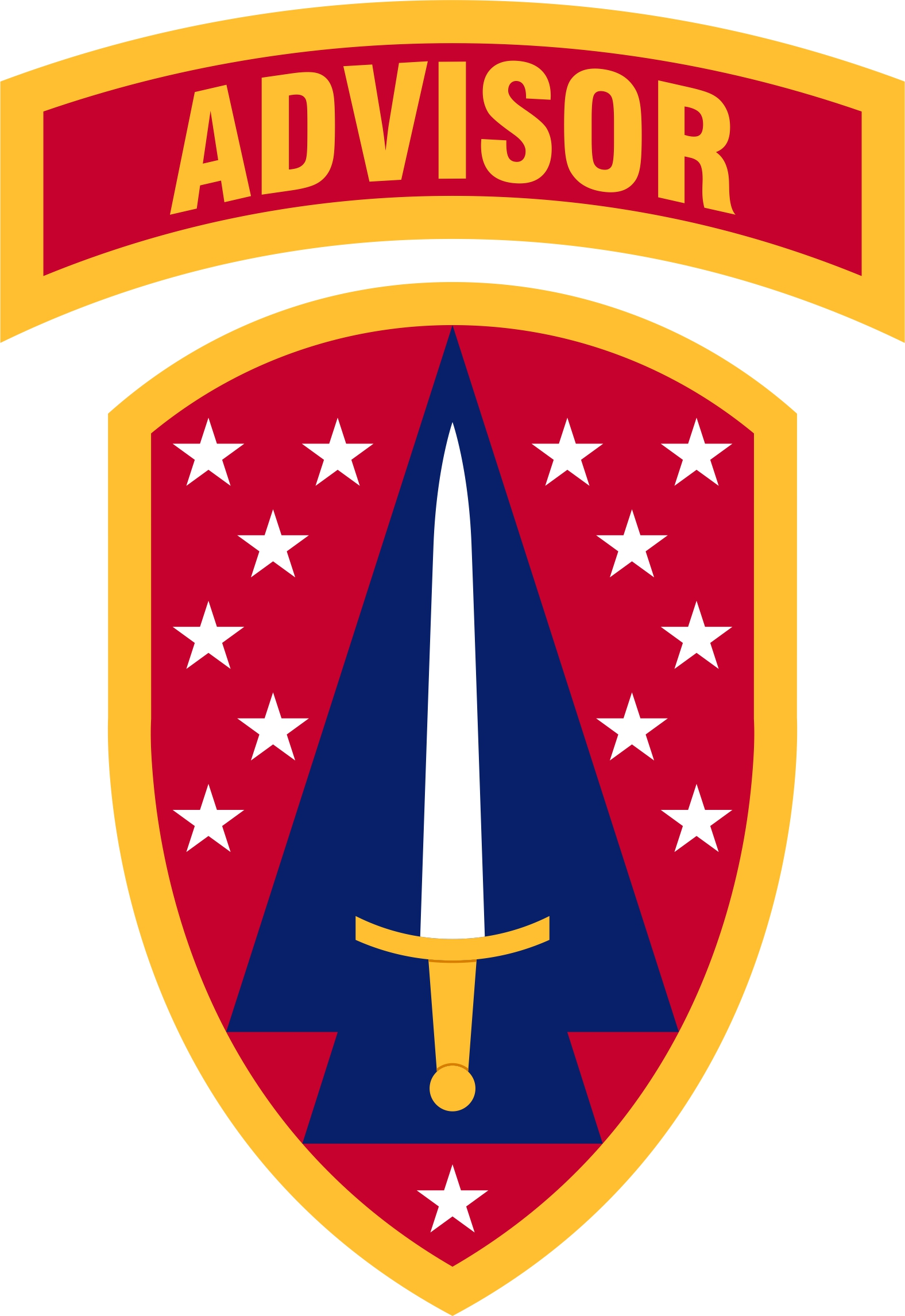
- 2nd Battalion, 54th Security Force Assistance Brigade
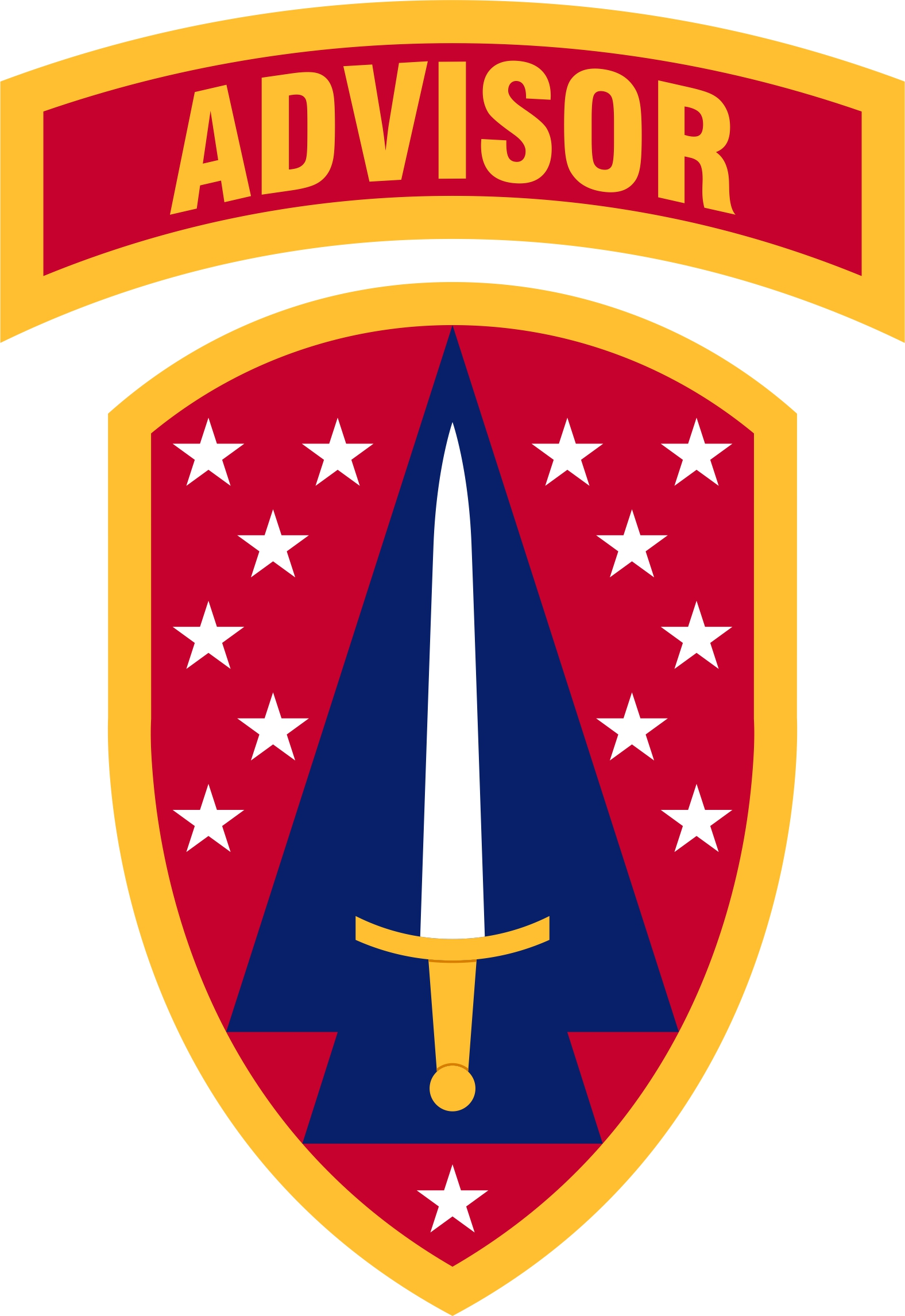
- 3rd Battalion, 54th Security Force Assistance Brigade

== Duties ==
National Guard units can be mobilized at any time by presidential order to supplement regular armed forces, and upon declaration of a state of emergency by the governor of the state in which they serve. Unlike Army Reserve members, National Guard members cannot be mobilized individually (except through voluntary transfers and Temporary Duty Assignments, e.g. TDY), but only as part of their respective units.

=== Active Duty Callups ===
Army National Guard personnel who are "Traditional Guardsmen" (TG) typically serve "One weekend a month, two weeks a year", with a smaller portion of personnel working for the Guard in a full-time capacity as either Active Guard Reserve (AGR) or Army Reserve Technicians (ART). TG personnel in more intensive combat specialties, such as on active flying status in Army Aviation or in unique ground units such as Special Forces, will often perform additional military duty beyond the standard 48 weekend drills and 17 days on active duty annual training, with such periods of duty often totaling in excess of 100 days per year.

Current Department of Defense policy is that no Guardsman will be involuntarily activated for a total of more than 24 months (cumulative) in one six-year enlistment period (this policy has changed 1 August 2007, the new policy states that soldiers will be given 24 months between deployments of no more than 24 months, individual states have differing policies). The largest mobilization in state history began in mid-2009. More than 4,000 FLARNG soldiers were called to active duty and most were to be deployed to Iraq and Afghanistan.

== See also ==
- Florida Naval Militia
- Florida State Guard
- MCTFT
