= 927th Combat Service Support Battalion =

927th Combat Sustainment Support Battalion
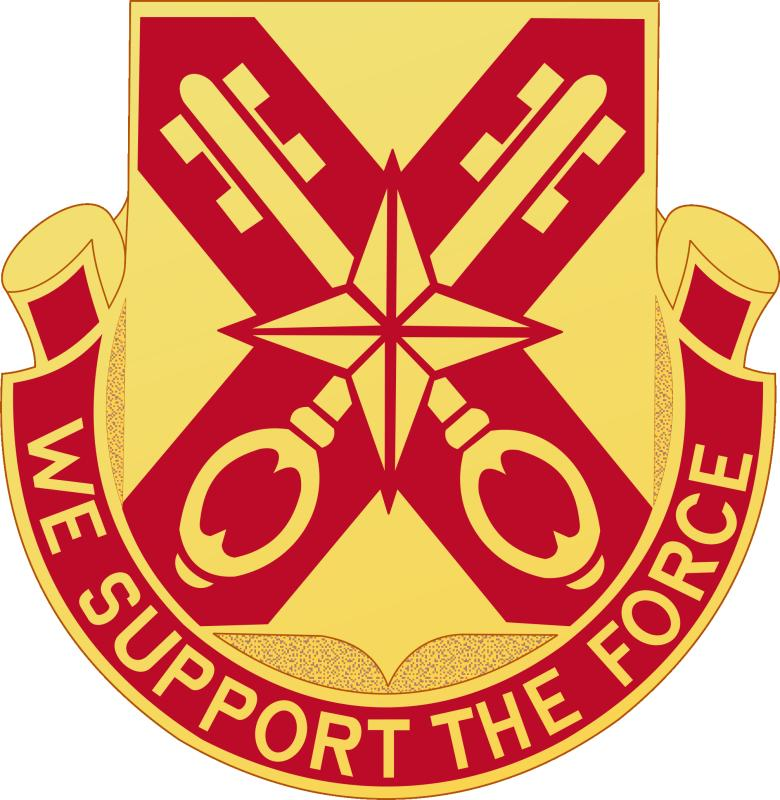
- Distinctive Unit Insignia
- Country: United States
- Branch: U.S. Army, FL Army National Guard
- Garrison/HQ: Camp Blanding, FL
- Motto: Victory Through Support

Insignia
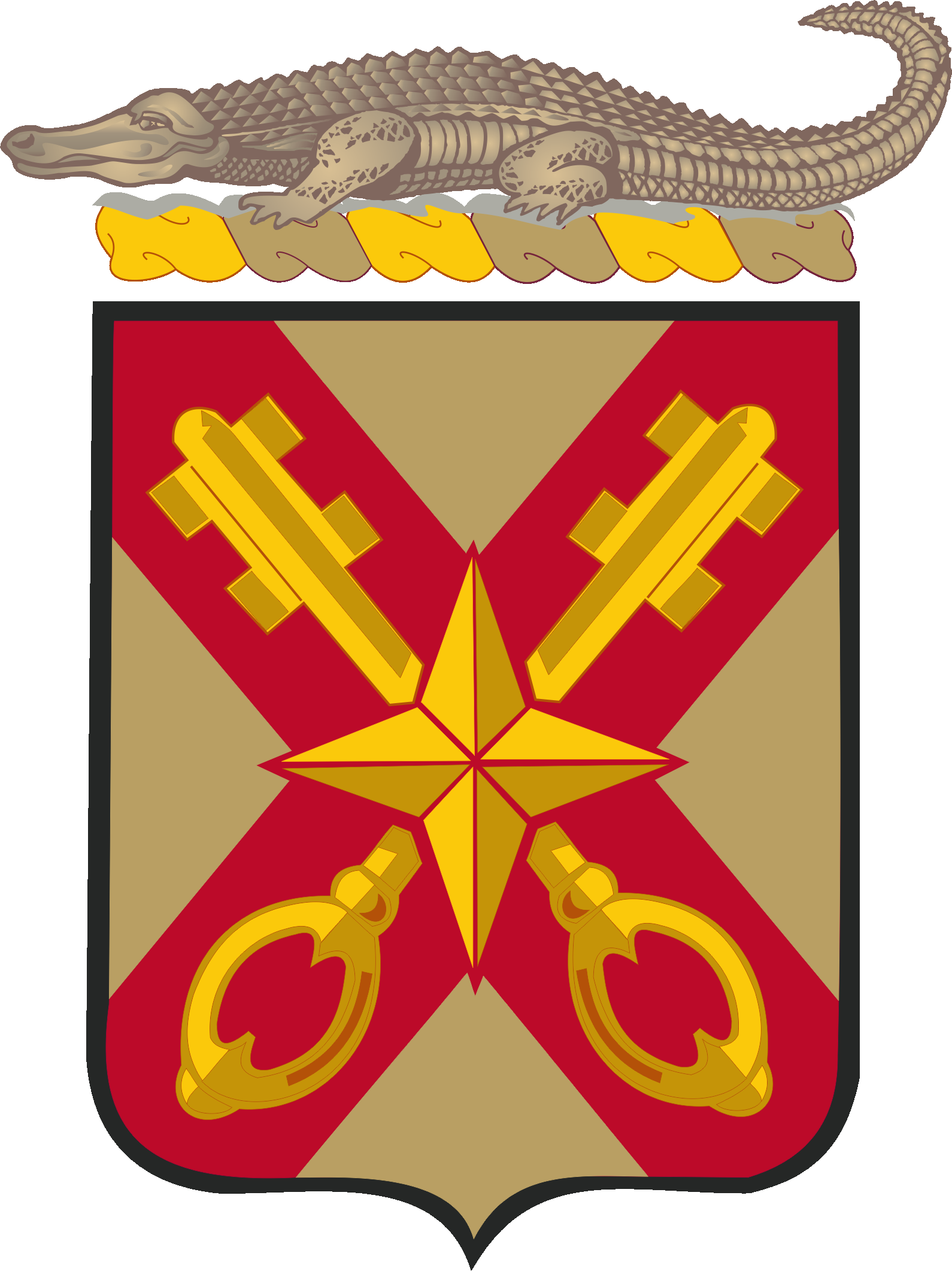
- Coat of Arms

The 927th Combat Sustainment Support Battalion is a component of the 50th Regional Support Group in the Army National Guard of the United States. Its headquarters are located at Camp Blanding in Florida. As of 2023, the battalion is commanded by Lieutenant Colonel Ben Ruffner and As of 2023, Command Sergeant Major Jose Cardona. Six companies are part of the 927th Combat Service Support Battalion:

- 356th Quartermaster Company
- 914th Quartermaster Company
- 907th Quartermaster Company
- 153rd Financial Management Support Unit
- 927th Headquarters Company
- 631st Maintenance Company
- 856th Quartermaster Company

The battalion headquarters returned from Operation Iraqi Freedom April 2008. LTC Valeria Gonzalez-Kerr and CSM Sally M Bailey was the first all woman command team in Iraq.
