= 631st Maintenance Company =

927th Combat Sustainment Support Battalion
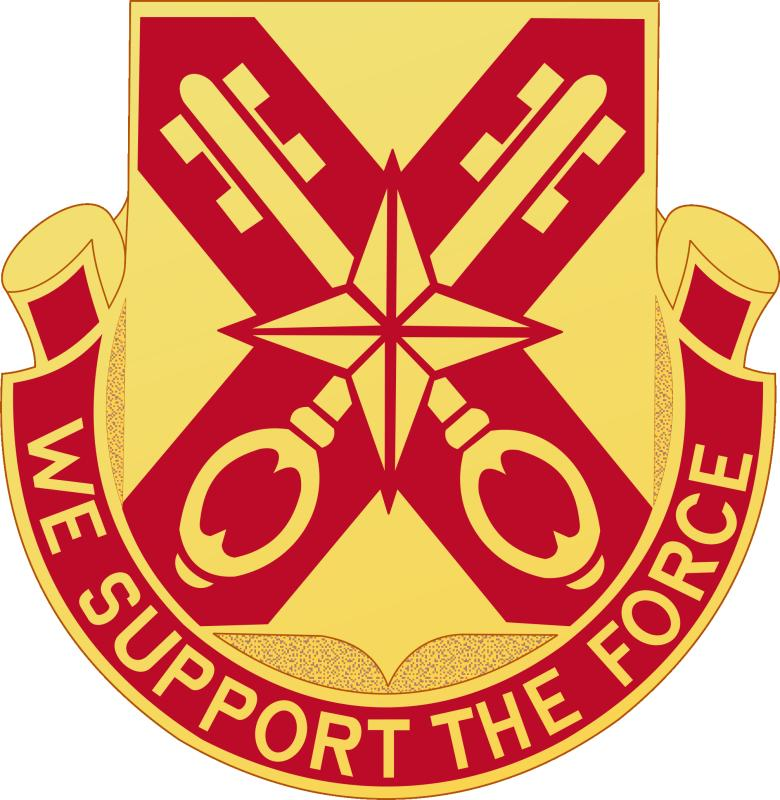
- Distinctive unit insignia
- Country: United States
- Branch: Florida Army National Guard
- Garrison/HQ: Camp Blanding, FL
- Motto(s): Victory Through Support

Insignia
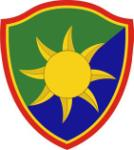
- Shoulder sleeve insignia

The 631st Maintenance Company is one of five companies of the 927th Combat Sustainment Support Battalion which is under the MSC of 50th Regional Support Group in the Army National Guard of the United States. Its headquarters are located at Starke, Florida. As of 2025, the company is commanded by CPT Chase Weiskopf and First Sergeant StClaire Sefcik.
