= 50th Regional Support Group =

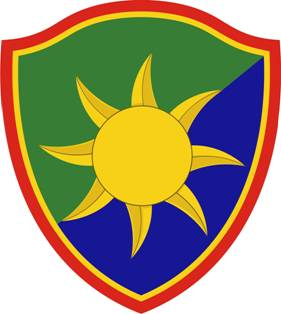
- Active: 1977 – present
- Country: United States
- Branch: United States Army National Guard
- Type: Support
- Size: Group
- Part of: Florida Army National Guard
- Garrison/HQ: Homestead ARB, Florida
- Motto: Success in Support

Commanders
- Current commander: Col. Jeremey M. Davis
- Command Sergeant Major: CSM Thomas Delano

Insignia
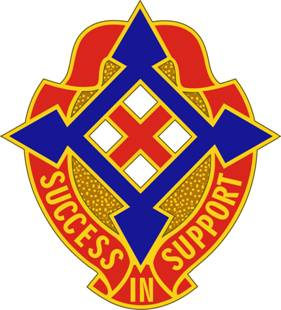
- 36th Regional Support Group DUI

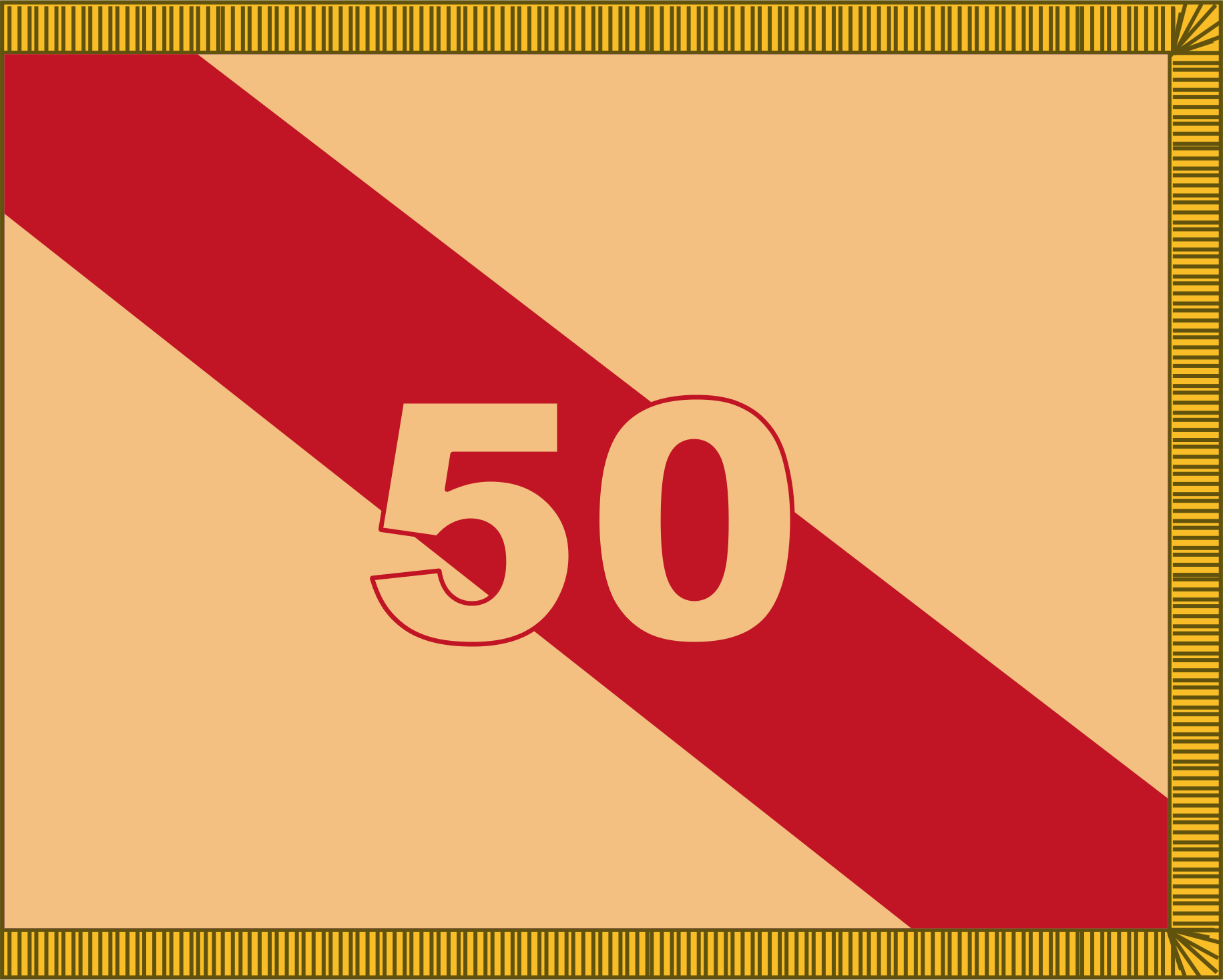
- 50th Regional Support Group Flag

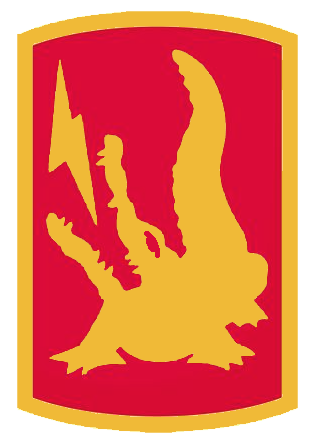
227th Field Artillery SSI

The 50th Regional Support Group is a unit of the Florida National Guard.

The 50th Area Support Group was constituted on 5 July 1946 in the Florida National Guard as Headquarters Company, 1st Battalion, 211th Infantry, an element of the 51st Infantry Division. It was federally recognized on 17 December 1946 at Miami. It consolidated on 15 April 1959 with the Service Company, 211th Infantry (organized and Federally recognized on 15 April 1947 at Miami), and the consolidated unit was reorganized and redesignated as the Combat Support Company, 1st Battle Group, 211th Infantry.

It converted and was redesignated on 15 April 1963 as Headquarters and Headquarters Battery 164th Artillery Group, and was relieved from assignment to the 51st Infantry Division. it consolidated on 1 May 1963 with Brigade Headquarters, 55th Operational Headquarters, and the consolidated unit was designated as Headquarters and Headquarters Battery, 164th Artillery Group.

Since 1988, the 50th Support Group had been stationed at the Homestead Armory, located on Homestead Air Reserve Base, Florida. Originally designated as the 50th Support Group, the unit adopted its current name in 2009. The 50th Support Group was reorganized from the 227th Field Artillery Brigade which was formed in May 1978.

In August of 2024 the 50th RSG was activated in response to Hurricane Debby.

== Organization ==
- 930th Digital Liaison Detachment Homestead
- 927th Combat Sustainment Support Battalion Camp Blanding
  - 356th Quartermaster Company Fort Lauderdale
  - 856th Quartermaster Company Arcadia
  - 144th Transportation Company Marianna
  - 631st Support Maintenance Company Starke
- 260th Military Intelligence Battalion Miami
  - 13th Army Band Miramar
- 146th Expeditionary Signal Battalion Jacksonville
- 254th Transportation Battalion West Palm Beach

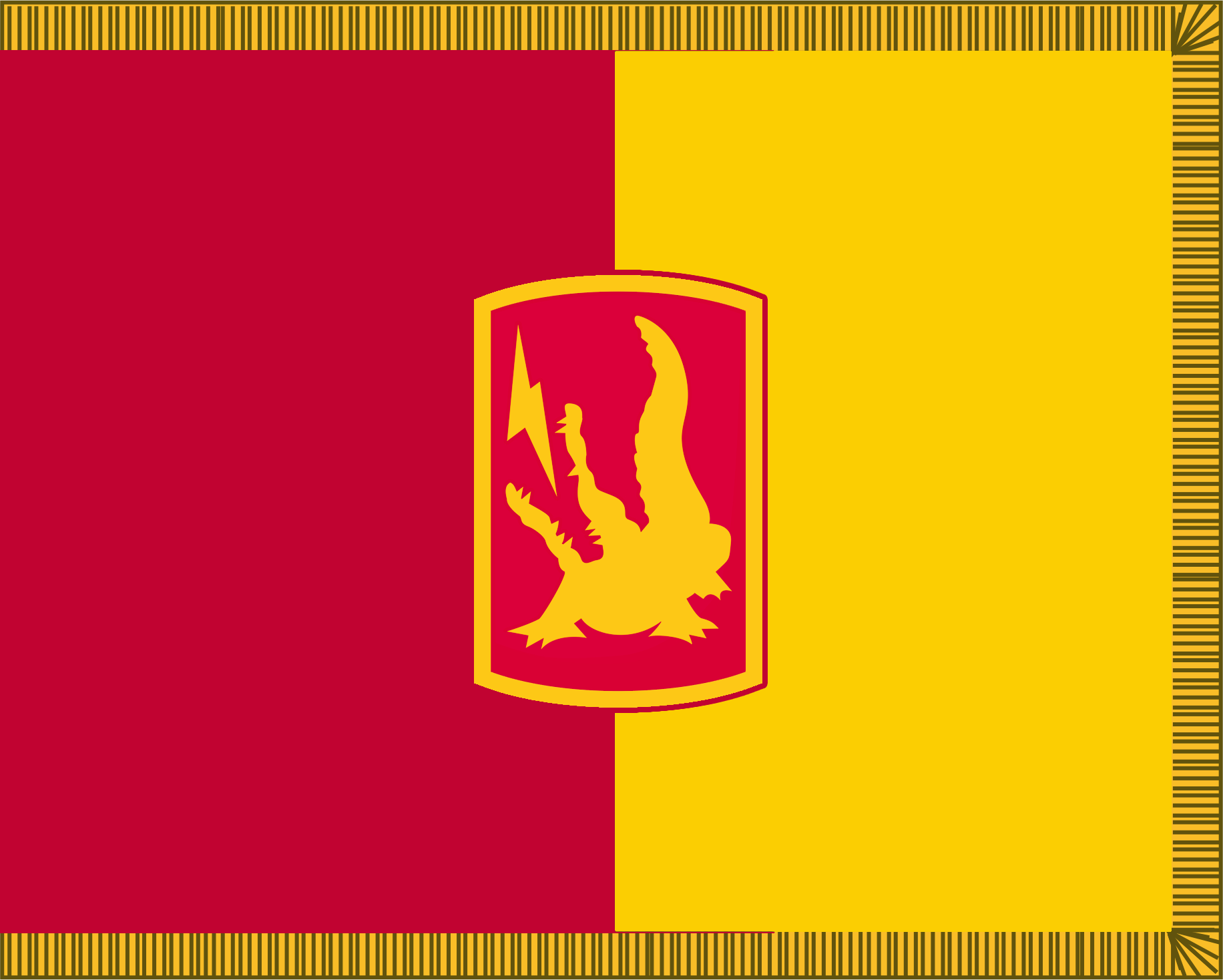
227th Field Artillery Brigade Flag
