= 164th Air Defense Artillery Brigade =

- 164th Air Defense Artillery Brigade shoulder sleeve insignia
- Active: 2004 – present
- Country: United States
- Branch: United States Army National Guard
- Type: Air defense artillery
- Size: Brigade
- Part of: Florida Army National Guard
- Garrison/HQ: Orlando, Florida
- Website: https://fl.ng.mil/Commands/164th-Air-Defense-Artillery-Brigade/

Commanders
- Current commander: COL Adam M. Curry

Insignia
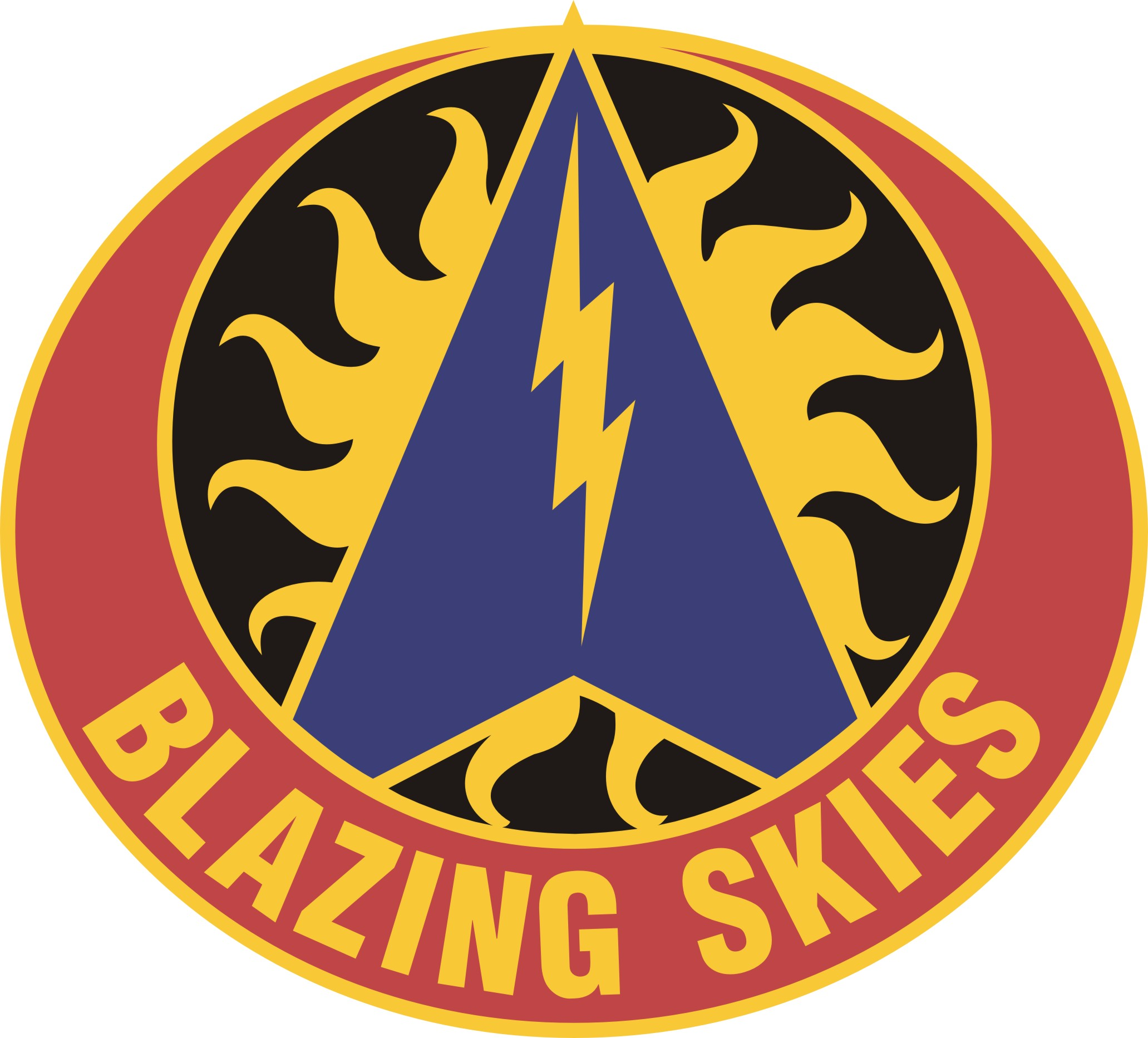
- Distinctive unit insignia

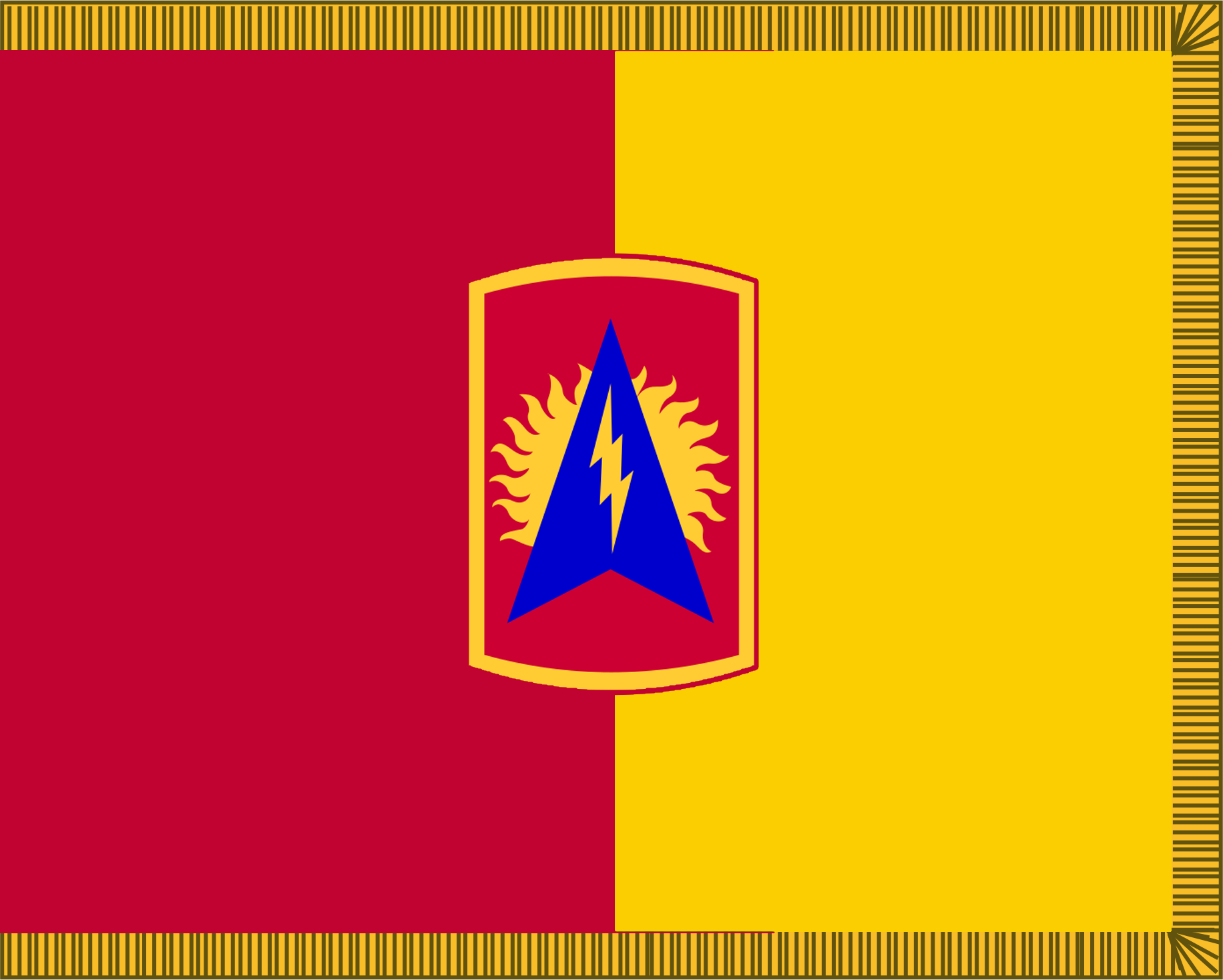
- 164th Air Defense Artillery Brigade Flag

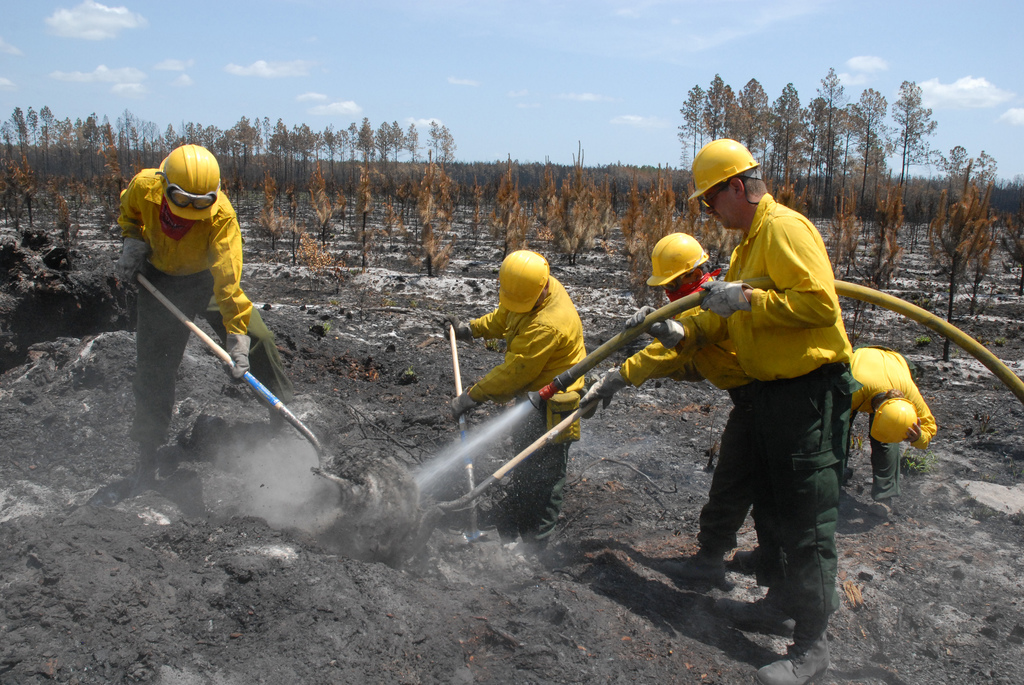
164th Air Defense Artillery Brigade soldiers help put out a wildfire.

The 164th Air Defense Artillery Brigade is an air defense artillery brigade of the United States Army as part of the Florida Army National Guard.

The unit is headquartered in Orlando, Florida on the site of the former McCoy Air Force Base and is composed of two air defense artillery battalions and one field artillery battalion located at 12 National Guard armories across Central Florida.

== Units ==
- 1st Battalion, 265th Air Defense Artillery Regiment(1-265th ADAR) (Avenger) - Palm Coast, FL
  - Headquarters and Headquarters Battery (HHB)- Palm Coast, FL
  - Battery A - Palatka, FL
  - Battery B - DeLand, FL
  - Battery C - Palm Coast, FL
  - Battery D - Palm Coast, FL
- 3rd Battalion, 265th Air Defense Artillery Regiment (3-265th ADAR) (Avenger) - Sarasota, FL
  - Headquarters and Headquarters Battery (HHB) - Sarasota, FL
  - Battery A - Bradenton, FL
  - Battery B - Fort Myers, FL
  - Battery C - Palmetto, FL
  - Battery D - Sarasota, FL

Peacetime mission command:

- 3rd Battalion, 116th Field Artillery Regiment (3-116th FAR) (HIMARS) High Mobility Artillery Rocket System - Plant City, FL
  - Headquarters and Headquarters Battery (HHB) - Plant City, FL
  - Battery A - Plant City, FL
  - Battery B - Avon Park, FL
  - 3116th Forward Support Company (3116th FSC) - Lake Wales, FL
  - 715th Military Police Company (715th MPC) - Melbourne, FL

== Commanders ==
Commander	From	To
BG Stephen "Steve" Villacorta	1 September 2002	31 August 2007*
BG James "Don" Tyre	1 September 2007	30 April 2009
BG Francis "Frank" Laudano III	1 May 2009	13 October 2012
COL Matthew "Matt" Hearon	14 October 2012	6 August 2015
COL Grant C. Slayden	7 August 2015	2 August 2018
COL Sean T. Boyette	3 August 2018	10 September 2022
COL Adam M. Curry	11 September 2022	Present

- First two years were in command of DET 1/32 AAMDC, which later became 164 ADA BDE.

== Recent Activities ==
The unit has supported the homeland defense mission through seven deployments commanding a multi-component task force responsible for securing the airspace in and around the National Capital Region. The latest deployment is Task Force Apollo.

In 2016, the brigade headquarters participated in Warfighter 16–3, a corps-level exercise in Fort Carson, Colorado, that allowed the unit to practice its warfighting functions, integrate as a fully functioning staff, and achieve its training objectives of planning and executing a theater-level air defense mission.

In response to Hurricane Matthew, the brigade was activated in its entirety, with 1,139 Soldiers assigned to 14 counties from 6–10 October 2016. Brigade Soldiers staffed 21 shelter in 5 counties for 3,304 displaced persons; distributed 34,824 bottles of water, 17,364 MREs, and 377 tarps at 6 Point of Distribution Sites; and conducted one security mission.

Later in 2016, the brigade headquarters participated in Yama Sakura 71, a theater-level exercise on Kyushu, Japan to enhance the U.S. and Japan's combat readiness and interoperability, strengthen bilateral relationships, and demonstrate U.S. resolve to support the security interests of allies and partners in the Indo-Asia-Pacific region.

In response to Hurricane Irma, the brigade was activated in its entirety and augmented with almost 400 Airmen, as well as Emergency Assistance Compact (EMAC) forces from the Georgia National Guard (both Army and Air), the New Jersey Army National Guard, and the United States Army Reserve, performing missions in 27 counties from 7–23 September 2017. Brigade Soldiers rescued hundreds of persons from rising water; staffed 79 shelters for 10,260 displaced persons; distributed 1,914,864 bottles of water, 1,013,808 MREs, and 366 tons of ice at 40 Point of Distribution Sites; and conducted six security missions. The University of Central Florida housed many brigade units in their stadium and practice field house, made available because of a canceled football game.
