= 265th Air Defense Artillery Regiment =

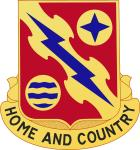
- Distinctive unit insignia
- Active: 1923–1944; 1946–present
- Country: United States
- Branch: Florida Army National Guard
- Type: Air Defense Artillery (current); Coast Artillery (1923–1944)
- Garrison/HQ: Central Florida
- Mottos: Home and Country
- Battle honours: WWII: Asiatic-Pacific Theater

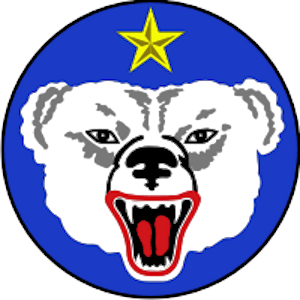
Alaskan Defense Command patch worn by the 265th while deployed to the Aleutian Islands in WWII.

The 265th Air Defense Artillery Regiment is an air defense artillery regiment in the Florida Army National Guard. The unit was formed 19 October 1923 in the Florida National Guard as the 1st Separate Battalion, Coast Artillery Corps. It was reorganized and redesignated as the 265th Coast Artillery Regiment (CA) (Harbor Defense) (HD) in 1929. The 265th was activated for World War II and served in the harbor defenses of Galveston, Texas, Los Angeles, California, Key West, Florida, Sandy Hook, New Jersey, and Alaska until broken up into battalions in July 1944. The unit lineage was carried by two antiaircraft battalions organized in 1946, one of which was federalized in Florida during the Korean War. They were consolidated with other units in 1959 as the 265th Artillery, and reorganized in 1987 as the 265th Air Defense Artillery.

== Lineage ==
=== Interwar period ===
The 265th Coast Artillery Battalion was constituted in the National Guard in 1924 as a three-battery battalion, allotted to the state of Florida, and assigned to the Harbor Defenses of Pensacola. The 1st Separate Battalion, Coast Artillery, was organized and federally recognized 14 November 1923 in the Florida National Guard with headquarters at Jacksonville, and was redesignated on 4 April 1924 as the 1st Separate Battalion, Coast Artillery Corps. The Battalion was redesignated on 22 July 1925 as the 265th Coast Artillery Battalion. The battalion was expanded to four batteries in February 1928, and on 20 November 1929, was expanded and reorganized as a five-battery, two-battalion regiment, as the 265th Coast Artillery Regiment. In October 1939, a sixth firing battery and a searchlight battery were organized. The regiment's designated mobilization training station was Fort Barrancas, Florida. The regiment conducted annual summer training most years at Key West Barracks, Florida, but also sometimes at Fort Barrancas, or Fort Monroe, Virginia.

In September 1926, September 1928, and September 1935, various elements of the regiment were called up to perform hurricane relief duty in South Florida. From July 1929 to June 1930, the regiment assisted with the Mediterranean fruit fly quarantine. From February to May 1935, the 2nd Battalion of the regiment was used for riot control in connection with a Veterans Works Project site. In March 1936, Battery C was used for guard and security duties when President Franklin D. Roosevelt visited Winter Park and Port Everglades, Florida.

Organization of 265th Coast Artillery Regiment (Harbor Defense), 1939
Unit	Location	Federally recognized	Notes
Headquarters	Jacksonville	14 November 1923	
Medical Department Detachment	Jacksonville	22 July 1921	
Headquarters Battery (less Band Section	Jacksonville	14 November 1923	
Band Section, Headquarters Battery	Miami	25 February 1930	
Headquarters, 1st Battalion	Jacksonville	7 December 1929	
Battery A	Jacksonville	25 May 1921	
Battery B	Jacksonville	28 September 1921	Originally recognized as 106th Motorcycle Co., 31st Div. Special Troops, 28 September 1921; redesignated 146th Motorcycle Co., IV Corps Quartermaster Train, 10 September 1925; redesignated Battery E, 265th CA (HD), 20 November 1929; redesignated Battery B, 265th CA (HD), 1 January 1930
Battery C	Daytona Beach	21 January 1921	Originally recognized as Battery D, 265th CA Bn. (HD), 1 July 1929; redesignated Battery D, 265th CA (HD), 20 November 1929; redesignated Battery C, 265th CA (HD), 1 January 1930
Headquarters, 2nd Battalion	Key West	16 December 1929	
Battery D	Pensacola	11 August 1927	Originally recognized as Battery C, 265th CA Bn. (HD), 11 August 1927' redesignated Battery C, 265th CA (HD), 20 November 1929; redesignated Battery D, 265th CA (HD), 1 January 1930; disbanded 15 November 35; rerecognized as Battery D, 265th CA (HD), 30 March 1936
Battery E	Orlando	29 June 1923	First organized in 1888 as "Island City Guards;" reorganized and recognized as 438th C.A. Co., 29 June 1923, assigned to 1st Sep. Bn., CA, 31 October 1923; redesignated Battery B, 9 February 1924; redesignated Battery B, 1st Sep. Bn., CA (HD), 4 April 1924; redesignated Battery B, 265th CA Bn. (HD), 22 July 1925; redesignated Battery B, 265th CA (HD), 20 November 1929; redesignated Battery E, 265th CA (HD) 1 Jan 1930
Battery F	Miami	2 October 1939	
Battery G (Searchlight)	Ocala	23 October 1939	

=== World War II ===
The regiment was inducted into federal service on 6 January 1941 at home stations. It moved to Fort Crockett, Texas, in the Harbor Defenses (HD) of Galveston, 15 January 1941. It operated these defenses alongside the Regular Army's 20th Coast Artillery Regiment. In December 1941, the 2nd Battalion was transferred to the HD of Los Angeles, California, where it was stationed until April 1942 when the regiment was ordered to Key West, Florida to man Fort Taylor in the HD of Key West, arriving 18 through 23 April 1942. The regiment operated the HD of Key West and various outposts in the Florida Keys and southern Florida until 21 December 1942, when movement to Fort Jackson, South Carolina, began, lasting until 23 January 1943. On 16 February 1943, the 265th CA departed Fort Jackson for Fort Hancock, New Jersey in the HD of Sandy Hook. There, the regiment helped to operate the HD of Sandy Hook and the HD of Southern New York until 19 June 1943, when it prepared for overseas deployment.

On 11 January 1944, the 265th CA departed New York for Fort Lawton, Washington, and deployment to Alaska, departing via the Seattle Port of Embarkation and arriving at Fort Greely in the HD of Kodiak, Alaska 24 January 1944. The 1st Battalion was transferred to Amchitka, while the 2nd Battalion went to Adak, both in the Aleutian Islands.

On 31 July 1944, the 265th Coast Artillery was inactivated and its elements redesignated. The Headquarters and Headquarters Battery (HHB) was disbanded. The 1st Battalion was redesignated the 277th Coast Artillery Battalion (155-mm Gun) (Separate) at Amchitka; the 2nd Battalion became the 278th Coast Artillery Battalion (155-mm Gun) (Separate) at Adak; and the 3rd Battalion, the 279th Coast Artillery Battalion (155-mm Gun) (Separate), at Shemya. The three battalions remained in the Aleutians through the end of the war, and were moved back to the United States via Seattle and inactivated in November 1945.

=== Cold War ===
The regiment was reconstituted 25 August 1945 in the Florida National Guard.

The headquarters and 1st Battalion, 265th Coast Artillery, were reorganized and federally recognized on 5 December 1946 as the 692nd Antiaircraft Artillery Automatic Weapons Battalion, an element of the 48th Infantry Division (later designated as the 48th Armored Division), with headquarters at Jacksonville; redesignated on 1 February 1949 as the 148th Antiaircraft Artillery Battalion.

The 2nd Battalion reorganized and federally recognized 17 December 1946 as the 712th Antiaircraft Artillery Gun Battalion with headquarters at Miami. It was ordered into active federal service 1 May 1951 during the Korean War at home stations; released 30 April 1953 from active federal service and reverted to state control. Location of headquarters changed 22 June 1953 to Sarasota. Redesignated 1 October 1953 as the 712th Antiaircraft Artillery Battalion (Headquarters Battery reorganized and federally recognized 15 September 1946 at Jacksonville as Headquarters and Headquarters Battery (HHB), 227th Antiaircraft Artillery Group; hereafter, separate lineage). The 148th and 712th Antiaircraft Artillery Battalions were consolidated on 15 April 1959 with the consolidated unit reorganized and redesignated as the 265th Artillery, a parent regiment under the U.S. Army Combat Arms Regimental System, to consist of the 1st Automatic Weapons Battalion and the 2nd Howitzer Battalion. Reorganized 15 February 1963 to consist of the 1st and 2nd Automatic Weapons Battalions and the 16th and 17th Detachments. Reorganized 20 January 1968 to consist of the 1st Battalion.

The 1st Battalion (Automatic Weapons) (Self-Propelled) was reorganized 1 October 1987 into the 1st and 3rd Battalions (Chaparral) with the HHB and Battery C forming HHB and Battery A of the 3rd Battalion. The regiment was withdrawn from the Combat Arms Regimental System on 1 October 1987 and reorganized under the United States Army Regimental System with headquarters at Palatka, Florida.

== Campaign streamers ==
World War II

- Asiatic–Pacific theater without inscription

== Coat of arms ==
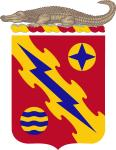

=== Motto ===
Home and Country

=== Symbolism ===
The colors scarlet and yellow are used for artillery. The unit’s service in Alaska during World War II is denoted by the bezant, a symbol for gold, and the four-pointed polar star. The diagonal stripe with the nebuly edges, heraldic symbol for clouds, bearing a lightning flash, signifies the Air Defense Artillery's mission. The barry wavy rounded alludes to water and refers to the regiment’s former Coast Artillery service. Additionally, it indicates the organization’s location in Florida and refers to the legendary "Fountain of Youth" sought by Juan Ponce de León, the discoverer of Florida. The alligator crest also represents the state of Florida.

=== Distinctive Insignia ===
The distinctive unit insignia is the shield and motto of the coat of arms.

== See also ==
- Escambia Rifles, a battery of the 265th Coast Artillery from 1936 - 1944.
- Seacoast defense in the United States
- United States Army Coast Artillery Corps
- Harbor Defense Command
