= Ocala Rifles =

Company C, 2nd Battalion, 124th Infantry
- Active: 1884-1919, 1939 - Present
- Country: United States
- Allegiance: United States
- Branch: Florida Army National Guard
- Type: Infantry (formerly Artillery, Cavalry and Armor)
- Size: Company
- Garrison/HQ: Ocala, Florida
- Nicknames: Historic: "Ocala Rifles"; Callsign: "Comanche"
- Engagements: World War I World War II; Iraq War; Afghanistan

Company C, 2nd Battalion, 124th Infantry is a historic unit of the Florida Army National Guard, stationed in Ocala, Florida. The company dates back to 1884 with the founding of the "Ocala Rifles". Ocala Rifles was an infantry company, serving on active duty in Florida and Alabama during the Spanish–American War and deploying to France with the 124th Infantry for World War I. Twenty years after the war, the company reorganized in Ocala as a battery in the 265th Coast Artillery, activating for harbor defense in January 1941 and eventually deploying to Alaska and the Aleutian Islands. After World War II, the company reorganized as an infantry company, then reorganized as a tank company and then in January 1968 as Troop E, 153rd Cavalry. The Cavalry unit served for 39 years and deployed to Afghanistan before consolidating with Company C, 2nd Battalion, 124th Infantry from Orlando in 2007. The company has deployed to Kuwait, Iraq and most recently, Djibouti and Kenya.

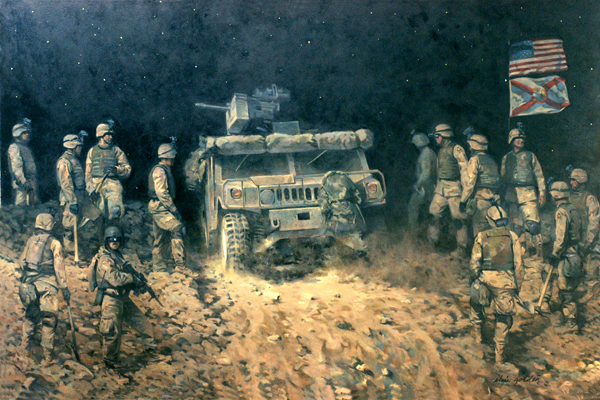
Company C, 2nd Battalion, 124th Infantry Regiment, of Orlando, clearing the berm for Special Forces soldiers to enter into Iraq, 19 March 2003.

== World War II ==
Battery G, 265th Coast Artillery was organized on October 23, 1939, in Ocala and less than one year later was reorganized on April 15, 1940, as Searchlight Battery, 265th Coast Artillery. On January 6, 1941, the Battery, along with its parent Regiment, was inducted into federal service and moved to Fort Crockett, TX arriving on January 15. Elements of the 265th helped man Forts Crockett, San Jacinto and Travis in the harbor defense of Galveston until April 1942 when the 265th was ordered to Key West, FL to man Fort Taylor. The 265th arrived at Key West between April 18 and 23, 1942, and manned Key West and various outposts in the Florida Keys and South Florida until December 21, 1942, when the movement of the 265th to Fort Jackson, SC began. By January 23, 1943, all elements of the 265th had cleared Key West. On February 16, 1943, the 265th CA departed Ft Jackson for Fort Hancock, NH to defend the harbor of Sandy Hook and harbors of southern New York, arriving there February 16, 1943. On June 19, 1943, the 265th started preparing for an overseas deployment. On January 11, 1944, the 265th departed New York for Fort Lawton, WA and deployment to Alaska departing via the Seattle port of entry and arriving at Fort Greely, in Kodiak, AK on January 24, 1944. The 1st Battalion was transferred to Amchitka while the 2nd Battalion went to Adak. On July 31, 1944, the 265th CA Regiment was inactivated.

== Post World War II ==
The unit reorganized after WWII as Company E, 124th Infantry in September 1948 in Ocala and then converted in 1955 as Company C, 187th Tank Battalion. In January 1968 the unit reorganized as Troop E, 153d Cavalry with 2d and 3d Armored Cavalry platoons stationed in Gainesville. The Gainesville platoons later became Detachment 1, Troop E. The Gainesville unit had been established post-WWII as Company G, 124th Infantry on May 10, 1948, then redesignated Company B, 187th Armor before becoming the Troop E Detachment. In October 1977, the Gainesville detachment consolidated with Troop E in Ocala.

== Global War on Terrorism ==
Troop E was mobilized and deployed to Afghanistan in 2005.

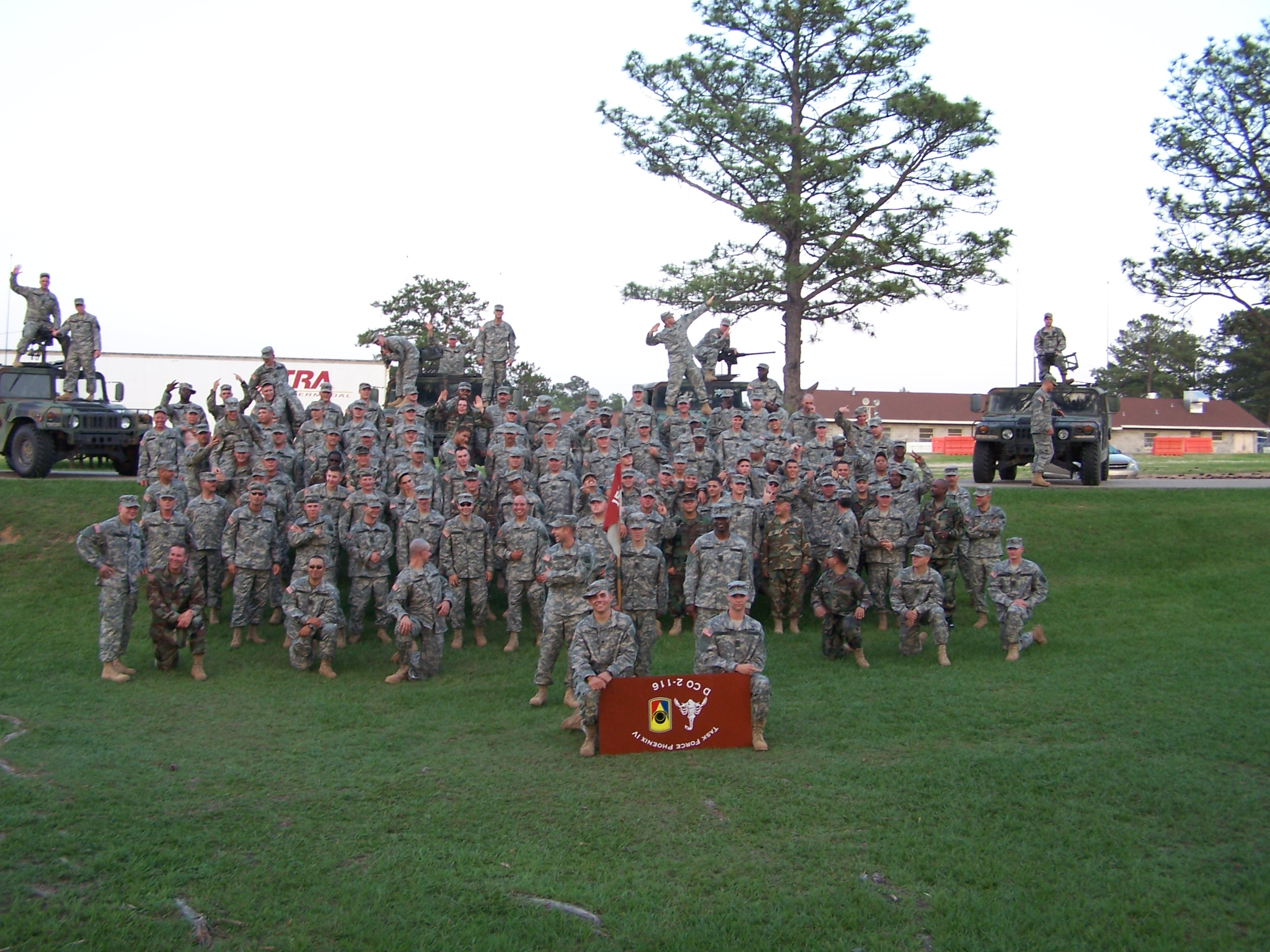
Troop E, circa 2005–06 before the unit deployed to Afghanistan.

On September 1, 2007, Troop E consolidated with a unit formerly based out of Orlando to create Company C, 2d Battalion, 124th Infantry. The 53d Infantry Brigade (Separate) went through a massive reorganization to become a Brigade Combat Team during 2006 to 2007. The Brigade lost its one reconnaissance troop, and converted one of its infantry battalions into a full reconnaissance squadron. Company C, 2d Battalion, 124th Infantry from Orlando had been constituted on July 1, 1979. The company, under command of Captain Jerry B. Glass, had served in Jordan and Iraq during the build up and invasion, and on the night of 19 March 2003, Company C assisted Special Forces units cross into Iraq by breaching the berms bordering Iraq and Jordan. The company was later stationed in Baghdad and was redeployed and released from active duty in April, 2004. The two companies were consolidated in Ocala and designated Company C, 2d Battalion, 124th Infantry.

Company C, and their parent unit, 2d Battalion, 124th Infantry and almost the entire 53d Infantry Brigade Combat Team mobilized under Title 10 orders on 2 January 2010 and moved to Fort Hood, Texas for nearly two months of training. In the first week of March the troop arrived at Camp Virginia, Kuwait. Company C conducting convoy escort missions into Iraq for the ten-month deployment. The company redeployed and demobilized at Fort Stewart, GA in December, 2010.

Company C, under command of Captain Ryan Knopfle, mobilized with its parent battalion in August 2015, training at Fort Bliss for just over one month and deploying to Djibouti where one platoon was attached to Company A, 2d Battalion, 124th Infantry. Company C (-) deployed from Djibouti to Kenya to provide security for the remote Camp Simba on Manda Bay. Company C and the 2d Battalion, 124th Infantry were sent to Fort Bliss in May thru June 5, 2016 to demobilize and release from active duty.

== Unit designations ==
- "Ocala Rifles", an independent company (1884 - 1919)
- Battery G, 265th Coast Artillery (October 23, 1939 - April 15, 1940)
- Searchlight Battery, 265th Coast Artillery (April 15, 1940 - 1945)
- Company E, 124th Infantry (September 9, 1948 - November 1, 1955)
- Company C, 187th Tank Battalion (120mm Gun) (November 1, 1955 - April 15, 1959)
- Company C, 1st Medium Tank Battalion (Patton), 187th Armor (April 15, 1959 - February 15, 1963)
- Troop E, 153d Cavalry (February 15, 1963 - September 1, 2007)
- Company C, 2d Battalion, 124th Infantry (September 1, 2007 - )

== See also ==
- Troop C, 1-153 Cavalry
- Escambia Rifles
- Suwannee Rifles
- Franklin Guards
