= 124th Infantry Regiment (United States) =

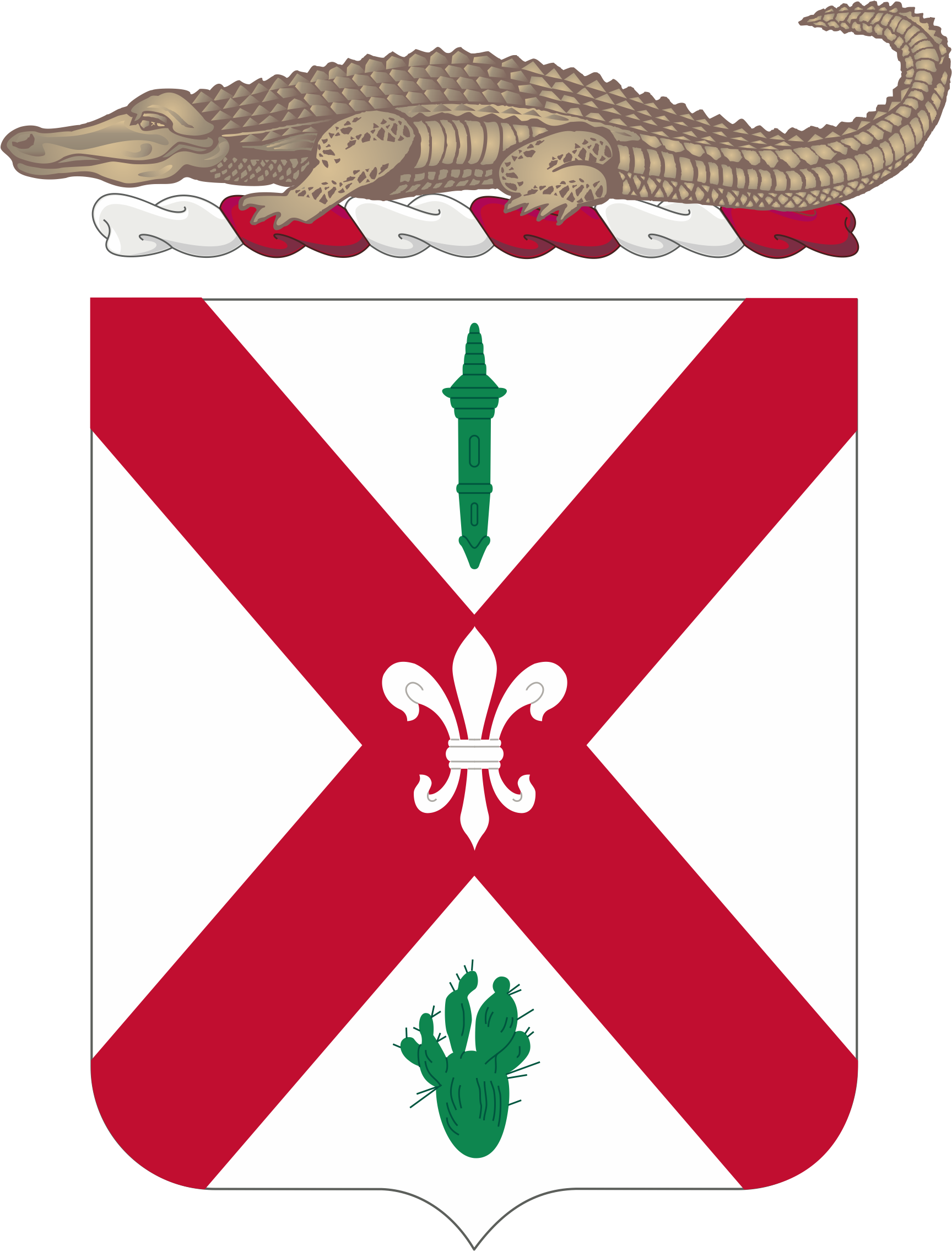
- Coat of arms
- Active: 1884–present
- Country: USA
- Branch: United States Army
- Type: Light infantry
- Nickname: First Florida
- Mottos: "Florida and Country"
- Engagements: American Civil War (elements); Spanish–American War; Pancho Villa Expedition; World War I World War II; Operation Iraqi Freedom; Operation Enduring Freedom
- Decorations: Presidential Unit Citation; Philippine Presidential Unit Citation

Commanders
- Notable commanders: Colonel Albert H. Blanding

Insignia
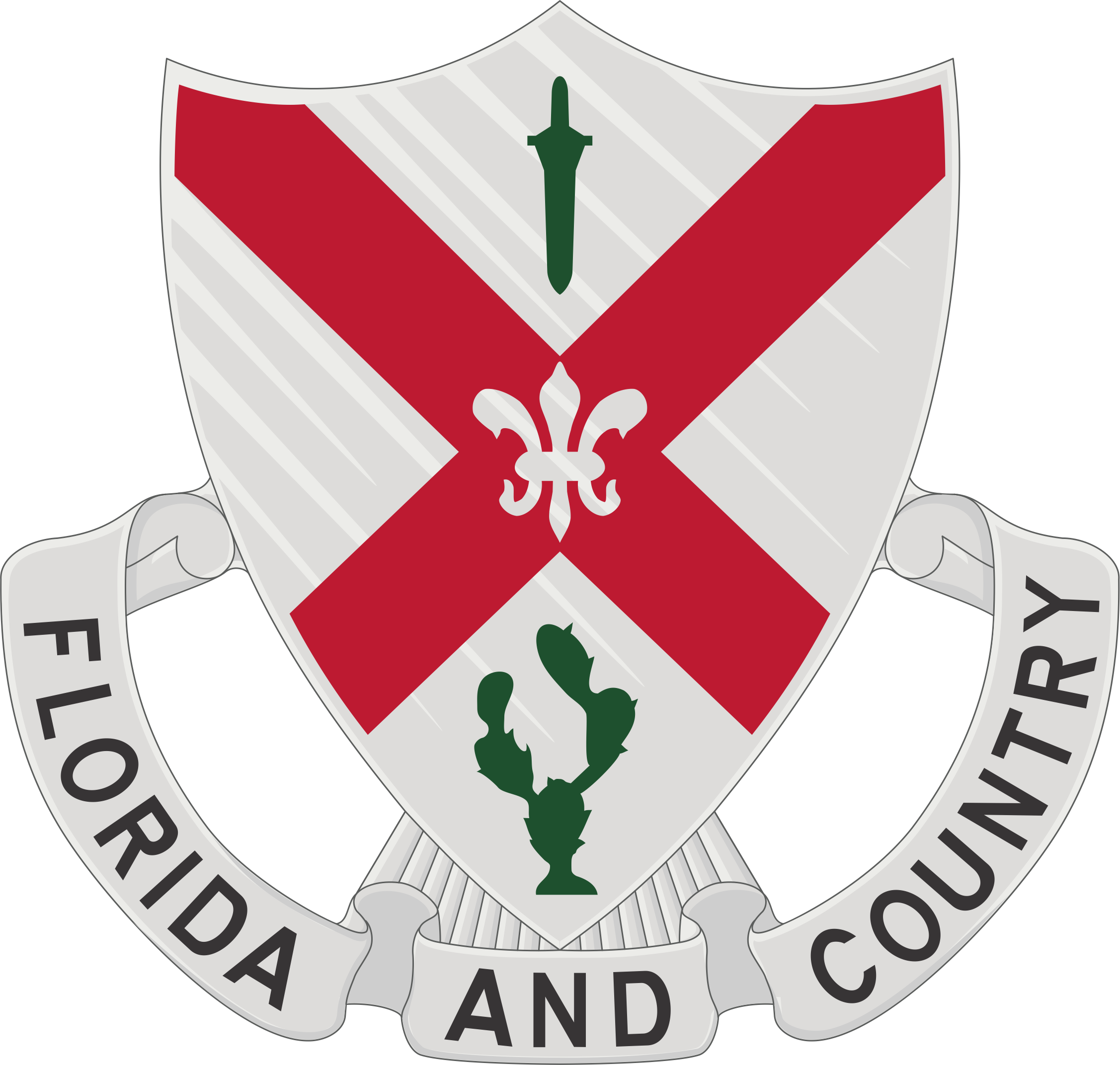
- Distinctive unit insignia

The 124th Infantry Regiment is a parent regiment of the United States Army, represented in the Florida Army National Guard by the 1st Battalion headquartered in Miramar and 2nd Battalion at Orlando. The two Battalions are elements of the 53rd Infantry Brigade Combat Team.

== History ==
The regiment was organized 1884–1892 in the Florida State Troops from new and existing companies as the 1st, 2d, 3d, 4th, and 5th Battalions of Infantry, with headquarters at Jacksonville, Ocala, Pensacola, Gainesville, and Arcadia, respectively.

In 1884, the 1st Battalion was formed in part by the Jacksonville Light Infantry, a company which was formed in April 1859, served in the Civil War, disbanded in 1865, and reorganized in 1880.

=== Spanish–American War ===
The battalions consolidated, reorganized, and mustered into federal service for the Spanish–American War 20–25 May 1898 at Tampa. The reorganized unit became the 1st Florida Volunteer Infantry Regiment. Eight companies of the regiment mustered out 3 December 1898 at Tampa and four companies mustered out 27 January 1899 at Huntsville, Alabama. The regiment's coat of arms bears a sheathed Roman sword, derived from the Spanish War Service Medal, representing service during that war.

The 1st Florida Volunteer Infantry was expanded and reorganized 17–18 August 1899 in the Florida State Troops as the 1st and 2nd Regiments of Infantry. The Florida State Troops were redesignated in 1909 as the Florida National Guard.

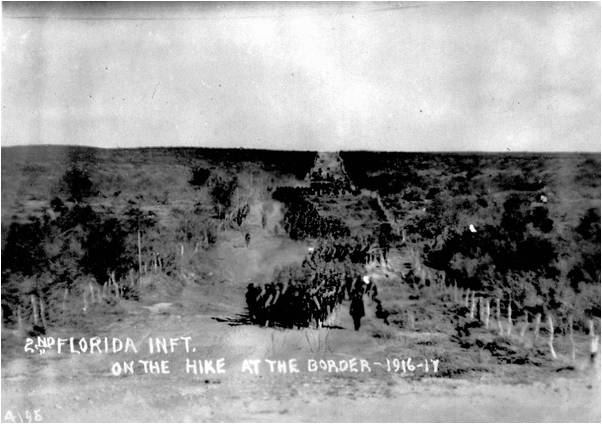
2nd Florida Infantry on the Mexican border, 1916–17.

=== Punitive Expedition ===
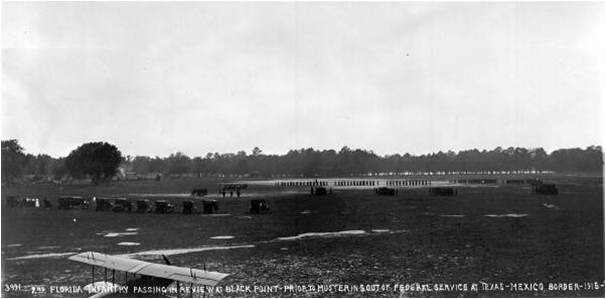
2nd Florida Infantry passing in review at Camp Foster prior to deployment on the Punitive Expedition

Commanded by Col. Albert H. Blanding, the 2nd Florida Infantry Regiment mustered into federal service in June 1916 at Camp Foster, Florida and then deployed to the Texas-Mexico border in support of the Punitive Expedition against Pancho Villa. The 2nd Florida mustered out of federal service in March 1917. The coat of arms bears a cactus symbolizing service on the border.

=== World War I ===
The 1st and 2nd Regiments of Infantry were drafted into federal service 5 August 1917 at Jacksonville and Wauchula, respectively.

The 1st and 2nd Regiments were consolidated, reorganized, and redesignated 1 October 1917 as the 124th Infantry and assigned to the 31st Division, as part of the mobilization for World War I. After the regiment arrived in France, it was split up and its soldiers were used to fill other units as replacements. The regiment demobilized 14 January 1919 at Camp Gordon, Georgia. The coat of arms bears a fleur-de-lis to symbolize its service in France during World War I.

=== Interwar years ===
In 1920–1921, the 1st Infantry Regiment was reorganized in the Florida National Guard, with the headquarters federally recognized 4 June 1921 at Jacksonville. The designations of the 30th, 31st, and 39th Divisions had been offered to the Fourth Corps Area in 1920-1921; the designations of the 30th and 39th Divisions were selected. The 31st Division, along with the 42nd Division, became the two divisions to be deleted from the postwar 18-division National Guard force structure.

During World War I, the 31st Division was made up of troops from Alabama, Florida, and Georgia, while the 39th Division was made up of troops from Arkansas, Louisiana, and Mississippi; in the postwar reorganization, the 39th Division had troops from Arkansas, Alabama, Florida, Louisiana, and Mississippi. The 154th Infantry Regiment, which had been made up of Arkansas troops during World War I, was reconstituted in the National Guard in 1921, allotted to the state of Florida, relieved from assignment to the 31st Division, and assigned to the 39th Division. The 154th Infantry was reorganized on 19 December 1921 by the redesignation of the 1st Infantry Regiment, Florida National Guard.

In 1923, the adjutants general of the affected states petitioned the War Department that the designation of the 39th Division be changed to the 31st Division, as most state units now assigned to the 39th Division had served in the 31st Division during World War I. On 1 July 1923, the 39th Division was redesignated as the 31st Division (less the Arkansas elements) and the 154th Infantry was concurrently relieved from assignment to the 39th Division, redesignated as the 124th Infantry, and assigned to the 31st Division.

In September 1926, September 1928, and September 1935, the regiment was called up to perform relief work and maintain order after strong hurricanes hit South Florida. From 31 May to 6 June 1927, the 3rd Battalion performed riot duty in Tampa, protecting a jailed accused killer from an angry mob; five rioters were killed by the Guardsmen defending the jail. Periodically between July 1929 and June 1930, the 1st Battalion and elements of the 2nd and 3rd Battalions performed guard duties in connection with the Mediterranean fruit fly quarantine in South Florida. In March 1933, Company H guarded Giuseppe Zangara, the would-be assassin of President Franklin D. Roosevelt, before his execution at the Florida State Prison at Raiford. From 7 to 9 June 1932, Companies A and B were used for guard and security duties in connection with the visit of Cuban national officials to Hollywood, Florida. In March 1935, elements were used for guard and security duties in connection with the visit of President Roosevelt to Winter Park, Florida.

The 124th Infantry conducted its annual summer training period at Camp Joseph E. Johnston or Camp J. Clifford R. Foster, Florida, and some years at Camp McClellan, Alabama. The regiment was inducted into active federal service at Jacksonville on 24 November 1940, and moved to Camp Blanding, Florida, where it arrived on 18 December 1940. In this period, the regiment participated in the Carolina and Louisiana Maneuvers.

=== World War II ===
==== Organization on 25 November 1940 ====
Unit	Headquarters location
Headquarters	Jacksonville
Headquarters Company	Jacksonville
Antitank Company	Jacksonville
Service Company	St. Augustine
Band Section, Service Company	Jacksonville
Medical Detachment	Sanford
Headquarters, 1st Battalion	Sanford
Headquarters Detachment, 1st Battalion	Sanford
Company A	Miami
Company B	Miami
Company C	West Palm Beach
Company D	Sanford
Headquarters, 2nd Battalion	Jacksonville
Headquarters Detachment, 2nd Battalion	Starke
Company E	Live Oak
Company F	Jacksonville
Company G	Jacksonville
Company H	Lake City
Headquarters 3rd Battalion	Orlando
Headquarters Detachment, 3rd Battalion	Winter Garden
Company I	Palmetto
Company K	Orlando
Company L	Bradenton
Company M	Tallahassee

On 15 December 1941, the 124th was relieved from assignment to the 31st Division. On 11 January 1942, it moved to Fort Benning, Georgia, where it was used as an additional demonstration unit for the students of the Infantry School. On 1 June 1942, it was assigned to the newly-activated Replacement and School Command, Army Ground Forces. It provided a portion of the cadre used to activate the 300th Infantry Regiment, another demonstration unit, on 10 December 1942. On 12 October 1943, it departed the Infantry School for Fort Jackson, South Carolina, under the XII and IX Corps. By the fall of 1943, less than half of the original Florida Guardsmen still remained with the unit. Large numbers of men from the regiment were subsequently transferred to the 4th Infantry Division, also at Camp Jackson, and the 30th Infantry Division, at Camp Atterbury, Indiana, while others were sent as individual replacements to the Mediterranean Theater. The 124th Infantry was formally inactivated on 2 March 1944.

The inactivation came as a shock to many in Florida, and the Governor, Spessard Holland, appealed to the Secretary of War that the 124th Infantry be kept in service. He stated that "Its inactivation would be a severe blow to morale both in and outside the service and arouse bitterness in the hearts of many of our citizens who have served in it in the past". The 124th Infantry was assigned on 5 April 1944 to the 31st Infantry Division and reactivated in Australia with the personnel and equipment from the 154th Infantry Regiment, 31st Infantry Division (activated 20 September 1942 in the Army of the United States), which was concurrently disbanded; at the time, the former 154th Infantry Regiment was composed of around ten percent Florida Guardsmen.

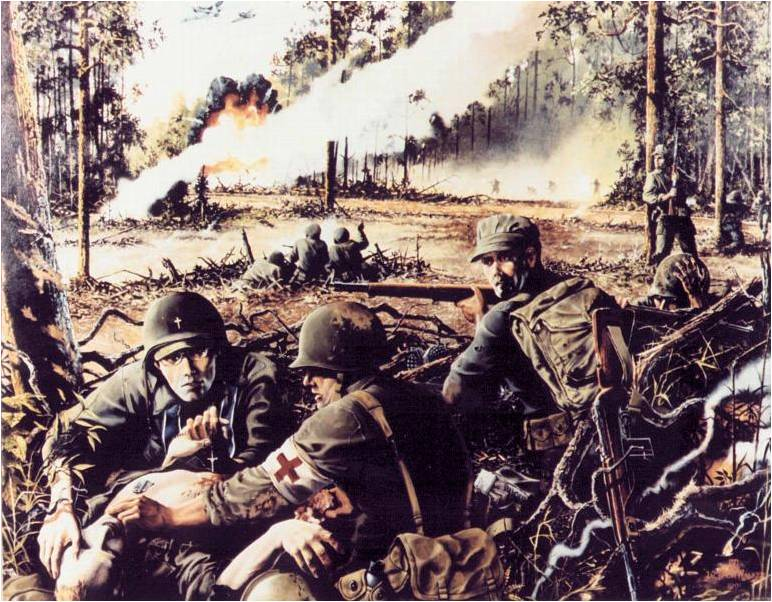
Colgan Woods by Jackson Walker

The 124th Regiment saw intense fighting on the island of Mindanao in the Philippines in 1945, especially in the Battle of Colgan Woods, named after Father Thomas Colgan, the Regimental Chaplain, who was killed in action while assisting wounded. Father Colgan was posthumously awarded the Distinguished Service Cross for his bravery. On 5 June, Corporal Harry R. Harr was killed covering a Japanese grenade with his body to save those around him. For this action, he was posthumously awarded the Medal of Honor. Lacking artillery support and facing an entrenched opponent, the 124th advanced for six days. The unit survived two banzai charges and inflicted heavy casualties on the Japanese. In the fighting, the 124th suffered 69 killed and 177 wounded.

The regiment was inactivated 16 December 1945 at Camp Stoneman, California.

=== Cold War ===
The regiment was reorganized, and federally recognized 15 February 1946 in the Florida National Guard as the 124th Infantry, with headquarters at Jacksonville and relieved 13 June 1946 from assignment to the 31st Infantry Division.

Assigned 5 July 1946 to the 48th Infantry Division. The 124th Infantry performed their first annual field training since reorganization at Fort Jackson from 18 July 18 to 1 August 1948.

==== Organization in 1948 ====
Headquarters	Company	Station
124 Infantry Regiment	Headquarters & Headquarters Company	Jacksonville, Florida
	Service Company	Jacksonville, Florida
	Heavy Mortar Company	Apalachicola, Florida
	Heavy Tank Company	Lake City, Florida
	Medical Company	Jacksonville, Florida
1st Battalion, 124th Infantry Regiment	Headquarters, 1–124 IN	Tallahassee, Florida
	Headquarters Company, 1–124 IN	Live Oak, Florida
	Company A, 1–124 IN	Tallahassee, Florida
	Company B, 1–124 IN	Marianna, Florida
	Company C, 1–124 IN	Panama City, Florida
	Company D, 1–124 IN	DeFuniak Springs, Florida
2nd Battalion, 124th Infantry Regiment	Headquarters & Headquarters Company, 2–124 IN	Lake City, Florida
	Company E, 2–124 IN	Ocala, Florida
	Company F, 2–124 IN	Jacksonville, Florida
	Company G, 2–124 IN	Gainesville, Florida
	Company H, 2–124 IN	Leesburg, Florida
3rd Battalion, 124th Infantry Regiment	Headquarters, 3–124 IN	Orlando, Florida
	Headquarters Company, 3–124 IN	Eustis, Florida
	Company I, 3–124 IN	Sanford, Florida
	Company K, 3–124 IN	Orlando, Florida
	Company L, 3–124 IN	Daytona Beach, Florida
	Company M, 3–124 IN	DeLand, Florida

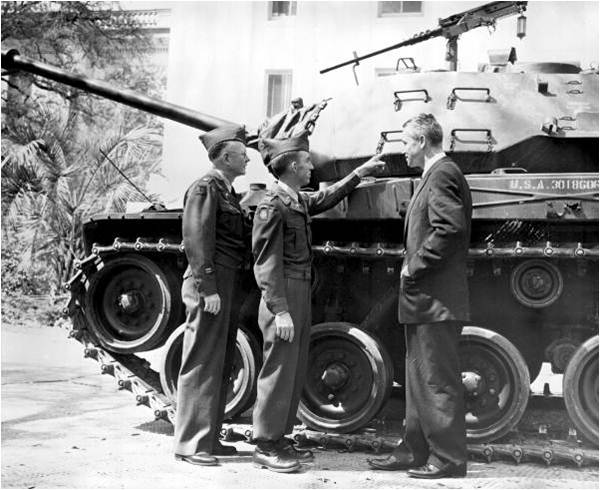
Lt. Col. Ralph C. Davis (Battalion Commander) and Capt. Russell W. Buckhalt (Alpha Co. Commander) brief Gov. LeRoy Collins on an M-41 tank in front of the Capitol in 1956.

The regiment was broken up 1 November 1955 and its elements reorganized and redesignated as follows: Headquarters and 1st Battalion as the 124th Armored Infantry Battalion and 3d Battalion as the 154th Armored Infantry Battalion; both assigned to the 48th Armored Division.

124th and 154th Armored Infantry Battalions consolidated 15 April 1959 to form the 124th Infantry, a parent regiment under the Combat Arms Regimental System, to consist of the 1st and 2d Armored Rifle Battalions, elements of the 48th Armored Division.

Reorganized 15 February 1963 to consist of the 1st and 2d Battalions, elements of the 53d Infantry Brigade (Separate).

Reorganized 1 March 1964 to consist of the 1st Battalion and the 2d Battalion, an element of the 53d Armored Brigade.

Reorganized 20 January 1968 to consist of the 1st, 2d, and 3d Battalions, elements of the 53d Infantry Brigade.

Withdrawn 1 May 1989 from the Combat Arms Regimental System and reorganized under the United States Army Regimental System with headquarters at Miami.

=== Afghanistan and Iraq from 2003 ===
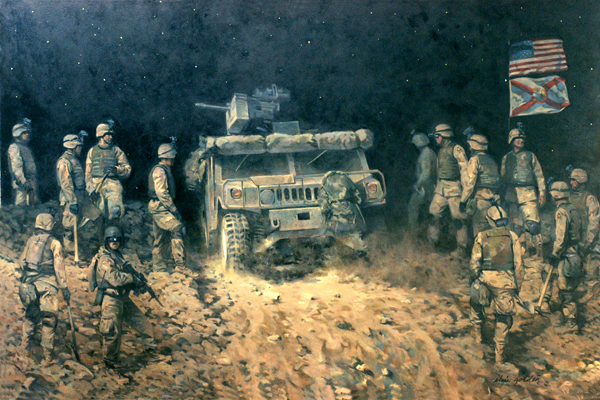
2nd Battalion, 124th Infantry Regiment clearing the berm for Special Forces soldiers to enter into Iraq, 19 March 2003.

On 26 December 2002, both 3rd and 2nd Battalions, 124th Infantry, were ordered into active federal service in support of the "war on terror". Ordered into active federal service 2–16 January 2003 at home stations; On the night of 19 March 2003, soldiers of C Company, 2nd Battalion, 124th Infantry, positioned in Jordan and both A and C Company, 3rd Battalion, 124th Infantry, positioned in Kuwait, were among the first U.S. soldiers to invade Iraq.

Released 11 April – 21 May 2004 from active federal service and reverted to state control.

In March 2005, elements of the 2nd Battalion were activated and deployed to the War in Afghanistan. In June 2006, D Company, 2nd Battalion, 124th Infantry, was activated and deployed as part of the Multi-National Force - Iraq.

The 2006–2007 Brigade Combat Team reorganization converted the 3rd Battalion, 124th Infantry into what is the 1st Squadron, 153rd Cavalry. The squadron was constituted entirely from the infantrymen of the 3rd Battalion, and so continue the 3rd Battalion's lineage.

The 2nd Battalion, 124th Infantry Regiment is currently headquartered in Orlando, Florida. It consists of six companies: Headquarters Company in Orlando, Company A in Leesburg, Company B in Sanford, Company C in Ocala, Company D in Eustis, and an attached Forward Support Company (FSC) - Co H, 53rd Brigade Support Battalion in Haines City.

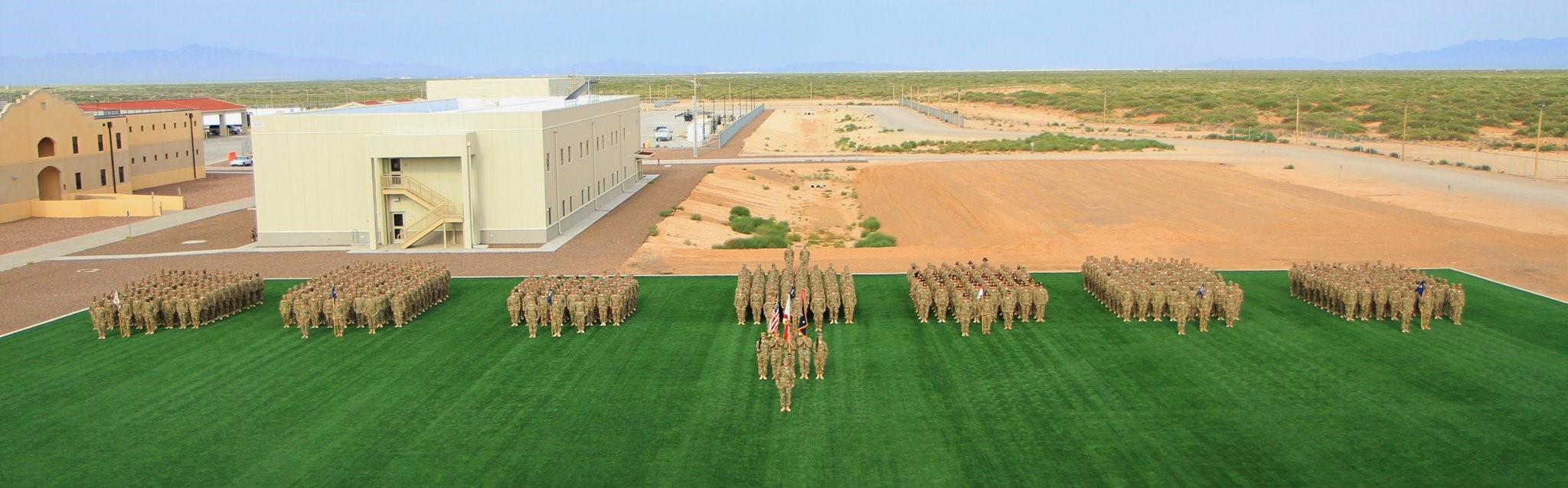
2d Battalion, 124th Infantry, Camp McGregor, New Mexico departing for Djibouti, September 2015.

== Distinctive unit insignia ==
- Description

A Silver color metal and enamel device 1 3/16 inches (3.02 cm) in height overall consisting of a shield blazoned: Argent, on a saltire Gules between in chief a Roman sword in sheath paleways point to base and in base a prickly pear cactus, both Vert, a fleur-de-lis of the first. Attached below and to the sides of the shield a Silver scroll inscribed "FLORIDA AND COUNTRY" in Black letters.

- Symbolism

The shield is white, the old Infantry color. The saltire is taken from the Florida State flag. The sheathed sword, from the Spanish War service medal, represents service during that war. The cactus symbolizes service on the Mexican Border, and the fleur-de-lis, service during World War I.

- Background

The distinctive unit insignia was originally approved for the 124th Infantry Regiment on 19 November 1927. It was redesignated for the 124th Armored Infantry Battalion on 20 April 1956. The insignia was redesignated for the 124th Infantry Regiment on 27 June 1960. It was amended to add a motto on 20 August 1968.

== Decorations ==
Ribbon	Award	Streamer embroidered	Order No.	Battalion
Dark blue ribbon with a gold border	Presidential Unit Citation (Army)	NEW GUINEA 1944		2nd & 3rd Battalions
Dark blue ribbon with a gold border	Presidential Unit Citation (Army)	IRAQ 2003	Permanent Order 110-15, 20 April 2009	3rd Battalion
blue, yellow, and red horizontal stripes	Presidential Unit Citation (Navy)	IRAQ 2003	Permanent Order 100-25, 9 April 2008	3rd Battalion
Vertical stripes alternating red, blue, white, blue, white, red, white, blue, white, blue, red with gold border	Valorous Unit Award	AL ANBAR PROVINCE 2003	Permanent Order 232-02, 19 August 2008	1st Battalion
Red ribbon	Meritorious Unit Commendation	IRAQ 2003	Permanent Order 222-30, 15 August 2007	HHC, 2nd Battalion
Red ribbon	Meritorious Unit Commendation	AFGHANISTAN JUL 05-JUL 06	Permanent Order 102-002, 15 August 2007	Co. C, 2nd Battalion (earned as Troop E, 153d Cavalry)
Red ribbon	Meritorious Unit Commendation	IRAQ OCT 2006-OCT 2007	Permanent Order 233-24, 21 August 2009=	Co. D, 2nd Battalion
Red ribbon	Meritorious Unit Commendation	IRAQ MAR–DEC 2010		2nd Battalion
Army Superior Unit Award ribbon	Superior Unit Award	2015-2016	Permanent Order 128-001, 8 May 2017	2nd Battalion
	Philippine Presidential Unit Citation	17 October 1944 to 4 July 1945		All
	Florida Governor's Meritorious Unit Citation	2003	(State award)	All
	Florida Governor's Meritorious Unit Citation	2010	(State award)	All
	Florida Governor's Meritorious Unit Citation	2022	Permanent Order 066-02, 16 March 2023(State award)	1st Battalion

== Regiment commanders ==
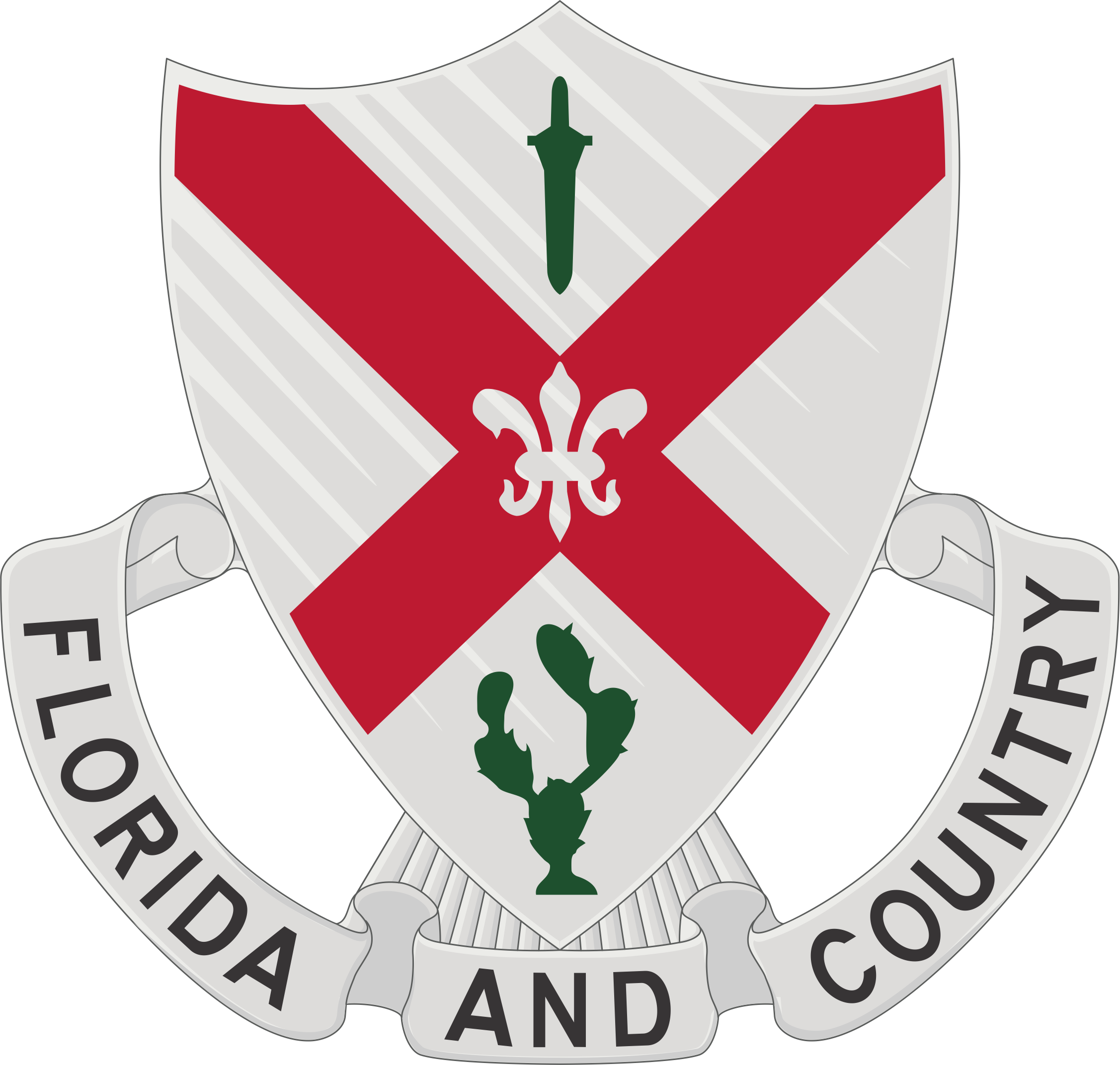
COL Raymond C. Turck, 124th Infantry Regiment, circa 1920s.

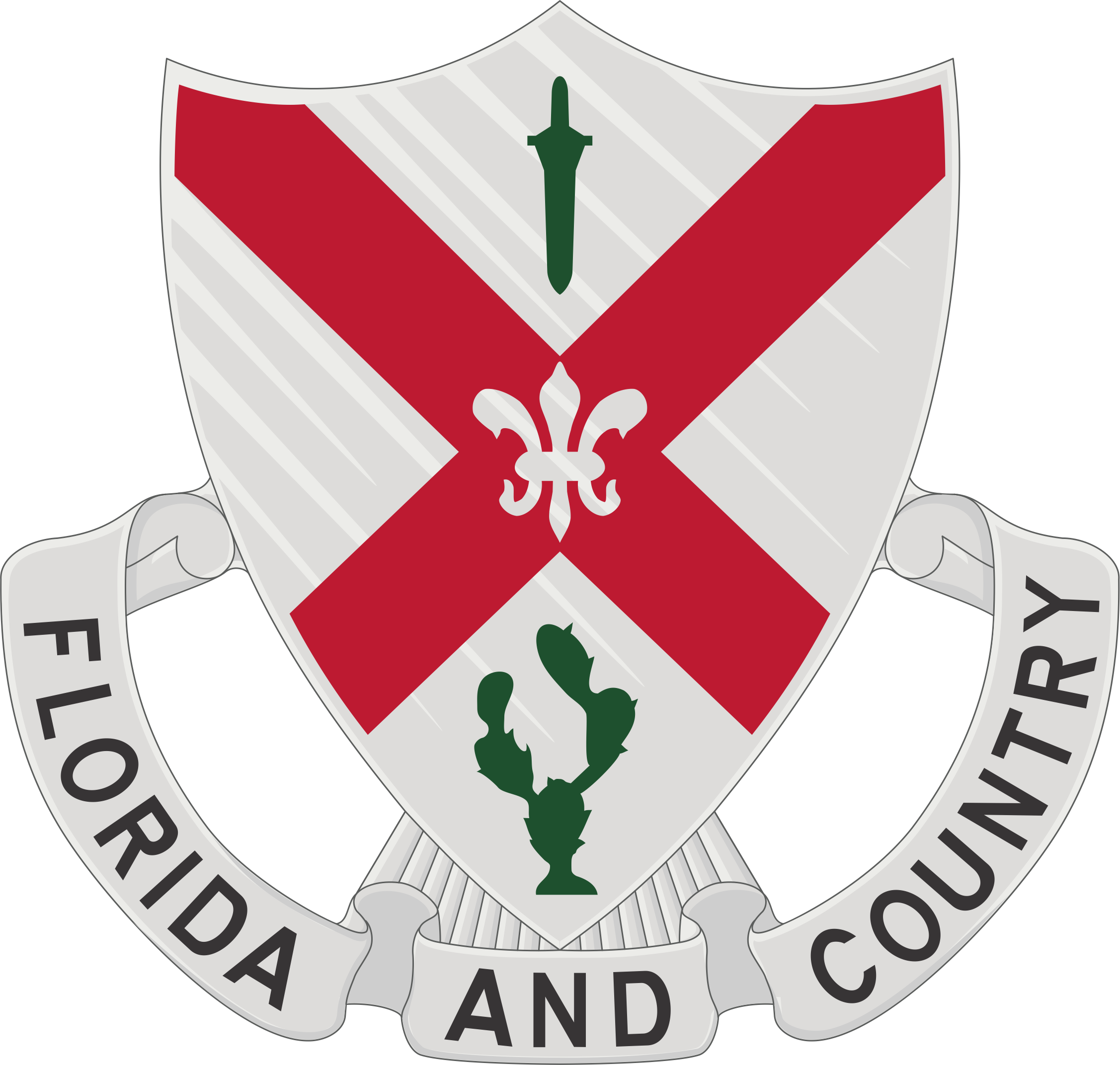
COL Vivian B. Collins, 124th Infantry Regiment, 9/30/1925 – 5/25/1928.

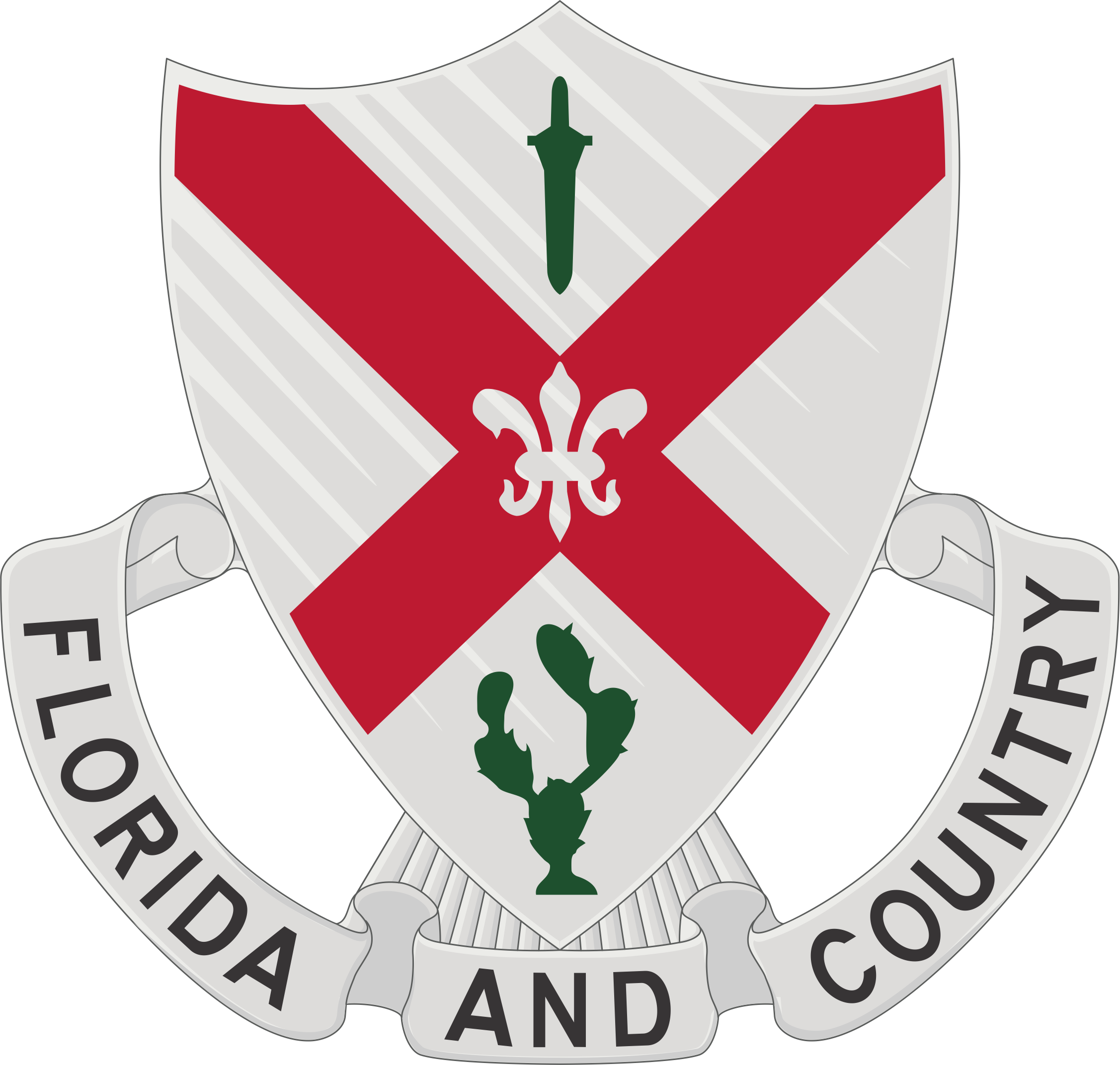
COL Chester Wilson, 124th Infantry Regiment, circa 1928–1934.

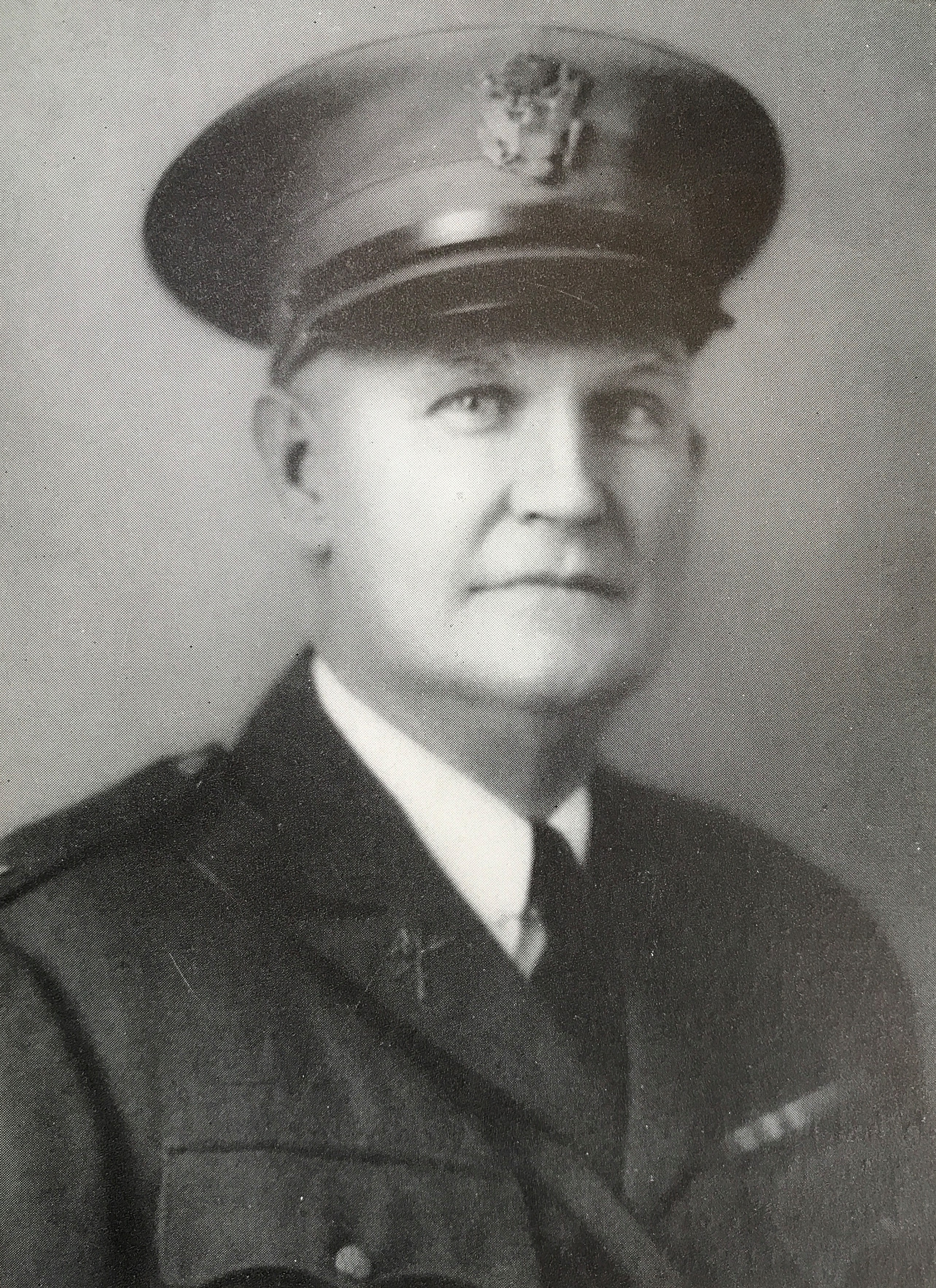
COL Preston Ayers, 124th Infantry Regiment, 7/13/1934 – circa 1940.

COL Fred Safay, 124th Infantry Regiment, 1940 - 1942.

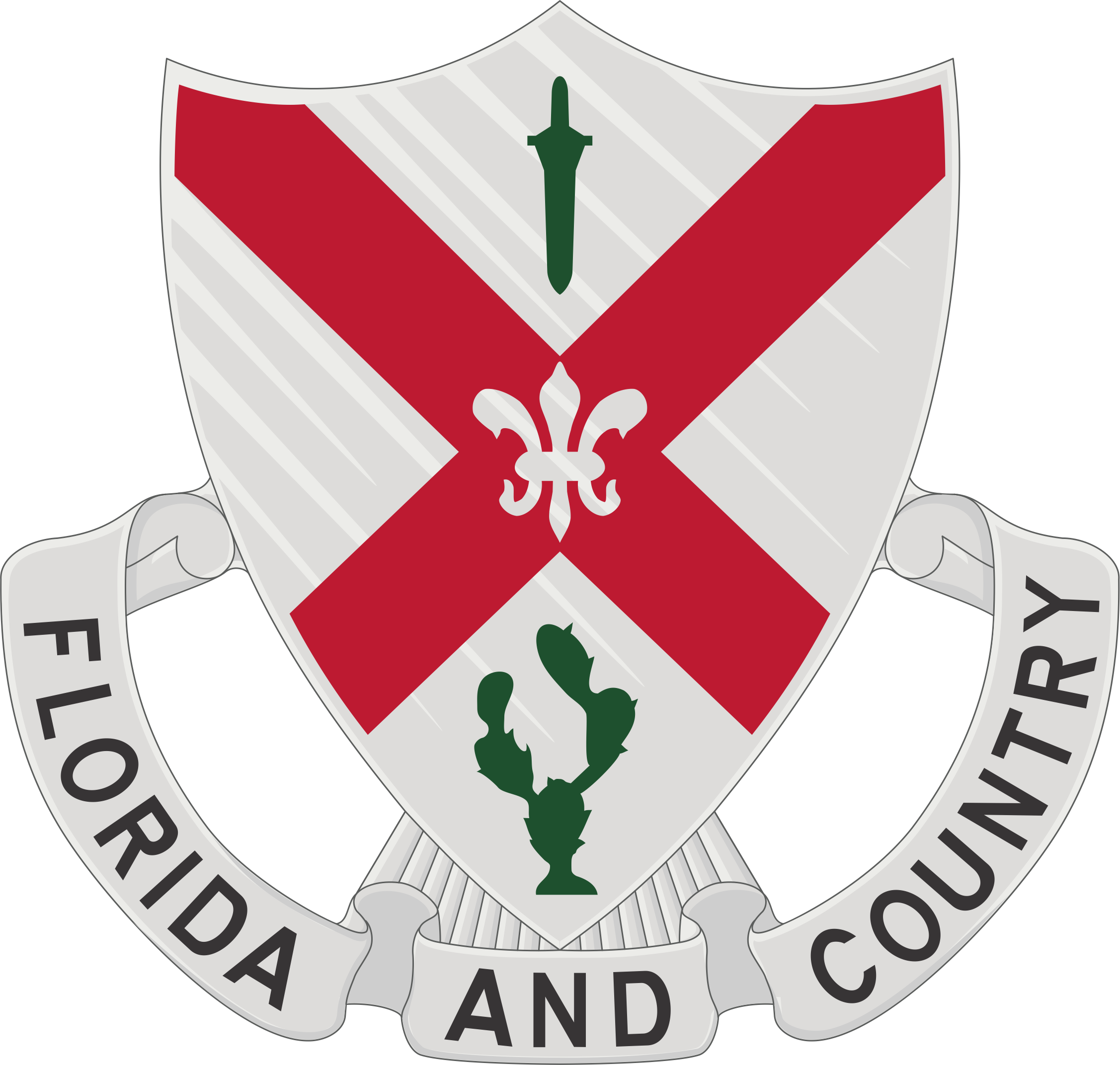
COL Maxwell C. Snyder, 124th Infantry Regiment, 1947–1952.

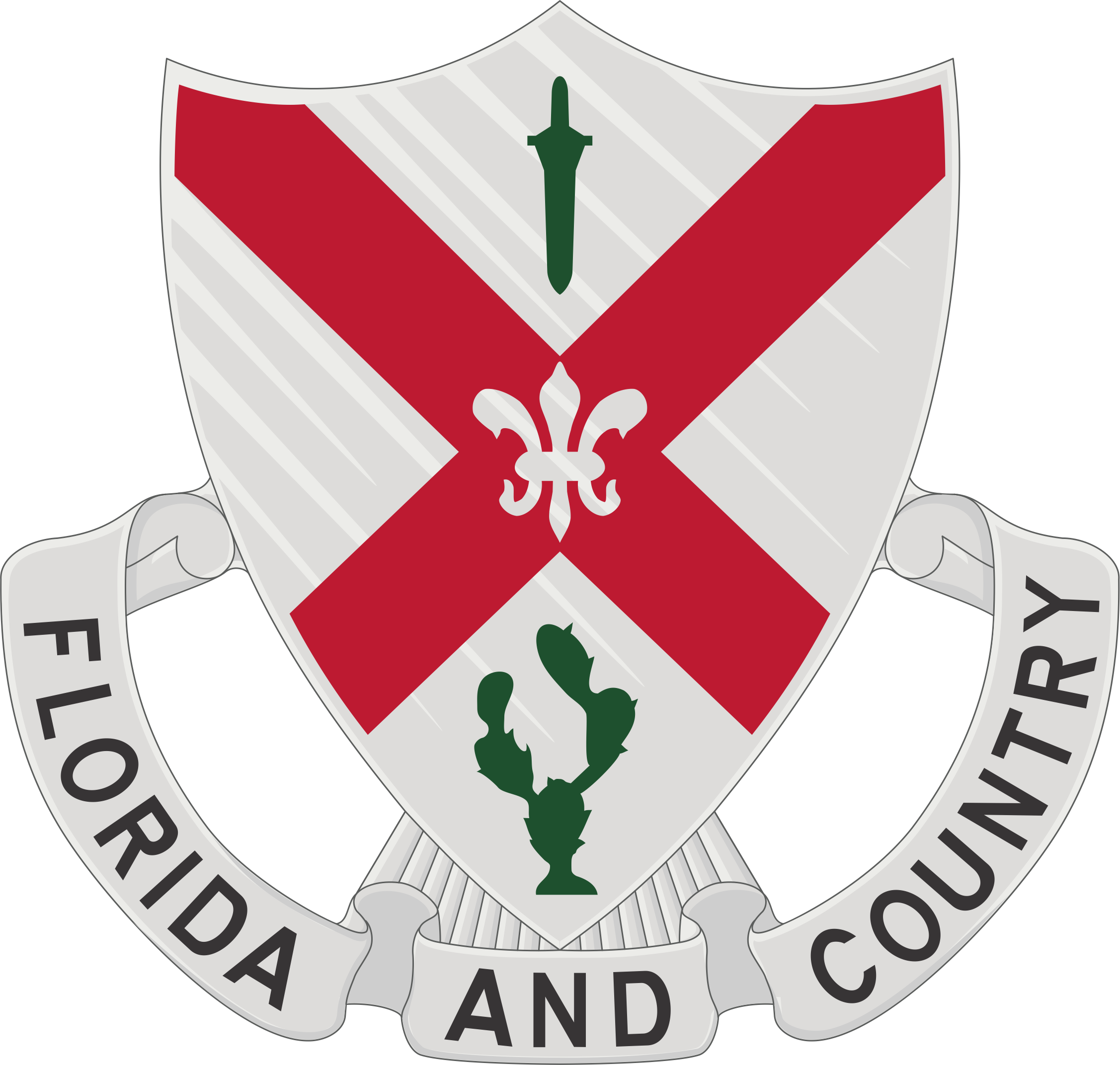
COL Robert B. Harkness, 124th Infantry Regiment, 1952–

== Campaign participation credit ==
World War I

- Streamer without Inscription

World War II

- New Guinea (with arrowhead)
- Southern Philippines

War on Terrorism

- Afghanistan: Consolidation I

Company B (Cocoa), 1st Battalion, additionally entitled to

- Southwest Asia, Defense of Saudi Arabia, Liberation and Defense of Kuwait and Cease-Fire

== See also ==
- 53rd Infantry Brigade Combat team
- 153rd Cavalry Regiment (United States)
- 31st Infantry Division (United States)
- 48th Armored Division
- 211th Infantry Regiment (United States)
- Colonel E. A. Perry, Commanded the Florida Brigade "Perry's Brigade" in the Army of Northern Virginia
- Colonel David Lang, Commanded the Florida Brigade "Perry's Brigade" in the Army of Northern Virginia
- Brigadier General Finegan, Commanded the Florida Brigade "Finegan's Brigade" in the Army of Northern Virginia
