= Escambia Rifles =

Company B, 146th Signal Battalion
- Active: 1873-1919, 1936 - Present
- Country: United States
- Allegiance: United States
- Branch: Florida Army National Guard
- Type: Infantry, Coast Artillery, Transportation
- Size: Company
- Garrison/HQ: Pensacola, Florida
- Nickname: "Escambia Rifles"
- Engagements: World War I World War II

The Escambia Rifles are the historical forerunner of Company B, 146th Signal Battalion of the Florida Army National Guard. They trace their history back to 1873.

== History ==
The Escambia Rifles were established in 1873 in Pensacola, Florida. The company was accepted into the Florida State Troops on December 31, 1887. In 1889 the Escambia Rifles were reorganized as Company A, 3rd Battalion, Florida State Troops. Captain Richard M. Bushnell took command of the Escambia Rifles on November 24, 1893 and attended their summer encampment at Camp Dunn, Ocala in 1893; Pablo Beach in 1894; Camp Henderson, Tallahassee in 1895; Camp Bloxham, Jacksonville in 1896; and again at Camp Henderson in 1897.

The Rifles were called into service in May 1898 in support of the Spanish–American War effort under the command of Capt. Richard M. Bushell with First Lieutenant Robert W. Cobb and Second Lieutenant John Whiting Hyer. The company was ordered to rendezvous at Fort Brooke, Tampa, leaving Pensacola on May 13 and arriving the following day. The company was redesignated Company H, First Florida Regiment and entered into Federal service on May 23, 1898. While on federal service the company performed guard and other duties around Florida and Alabama. First, on May 21, they moved to Palmetto Beach, then left on July 21 for Fernandina arriving the next day. On August 23, the company started movement to Huntsville, Alabama where they arrived two days later. On October 6, Robert W. Cobb was appointed Captain and commander of the company. Finally the company was ordered to report to Tallahassee, leaving Huntsville on October 9 and arriving on October 11, where they were given thirty days of furlough before being mustered out of federal service on December 3, 1898.

Escambia Rifles reorganized as Company I, 1st Florida Infantry in 1899, disbanded in 1905 and reorganized as Company I again in 1911. The company again disbanded in 1915 and reorganized on May 16, 1917 as Company I, 1st Florida Infantry and the company entered Federal service for World War I on August 5, 1917. The company most likely served in France as part of the 31st Division and other units; the 31st Division was "skeletonized" to provide replacements for other units shortly after arriving in France.

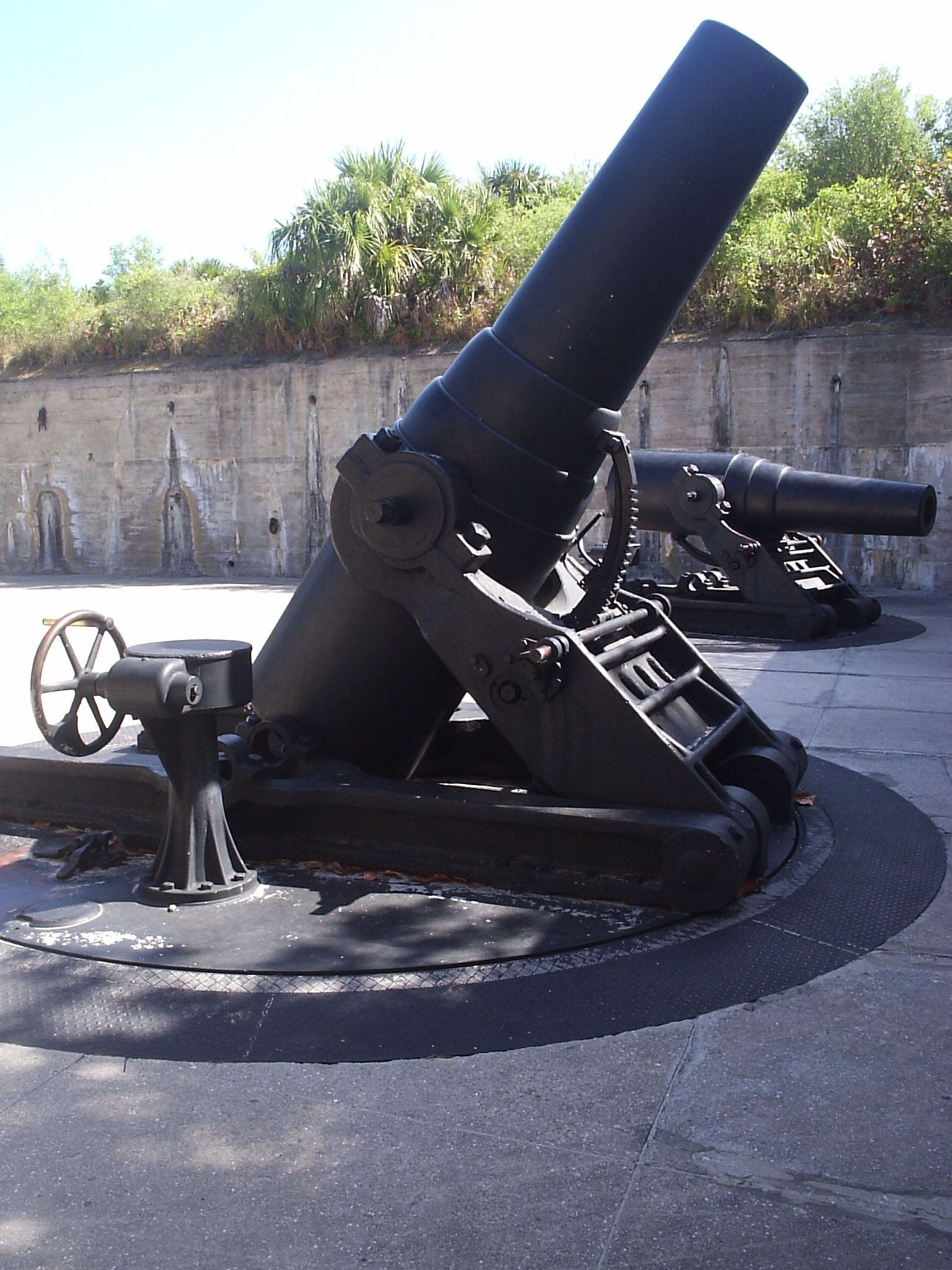
Type of 12-inch mortars used by Battery D, 265th Coast Artillery.

Seventeen years after being demobilized, the unit reorganized as Battery D, 265th Coast Artillery Regiment in March 1936 under the command of Capt. Archibald S. Mills, First Lieutenant Edson E. Dailey, and Second Lieutenant Samuel Pasco, Jr. By March 26 the battery had 58 applicants and an armory. The battery was designated a Harbor Defense (HD) unit and assigned 12-inch mortars, receiving their initial training at Fort Barrancas and traveling by "motor convoy, train, and boat" to Fort Taylor in Key West for annual encampment and training from 1936 through 1939.

The unit was redesignated Battery C under command of Captain Edson Dailey with First Lieutenant Samuel Pasco, Jr., Second Lieutenants John P. Tarver and Jeptha L. Larkin, and First Sergeant Harry Botts. The battery mustered with 106 total officers and men. Battery C, along with its parent Regiment, was inducted into federal service January 6, 1941 and moved to Fort Crockett, TX arriving on January 15. Elements of the 265th helped man Forts Crockett, San Jacinto and Travis in the harbor defense of Galveston until April 1942 when the 265th was ordered to Key West, FL to man Fort Taylor. The 265th arrived at Key West between April 18 and 23, 1942, and manned Key West and various outposts in the Florida Keys and South Florida until December 21, 1942 when the movement of the 265th to Fort Jackson, SC began. By January 23, 1943 all elements of the 265th had cleared Key West. On February 16, 1943, the 265th CA departed Ft Jackson for Fort Hancock, New Jersey to defend the harbor of Sandy Hook and harbors of southern New York, arriving there February 16, 1943. On June 19, 1943, the 265th started preparing for an overseas deployment. On January 11, 1944 the 265th departed New York for Fort Lawton, WA and deployment to Alaska departing via the Seattle port of entry and arriving at Fort Greely, in Kodiak, AK on January 24, 1944. The 1st Battalion was transferred to Amchitka while the 2nd Battalion went to Adak. On July 31, 1944, the 265th CA Regiment was inactivated. The 1st Battalion was redesignated as the 277th CA (155-mm Gun) Battalion (Separate) at Amchitka in the Aleutian Islands; the Escambia Rifles' personnel most likely remained with this unit. The 277th CA Battalion remained in the Aleutians through the end of the war, and was moved back to the United States via Seattle and inactivated at Fort Lawton, Washington state on 4 December 1945.

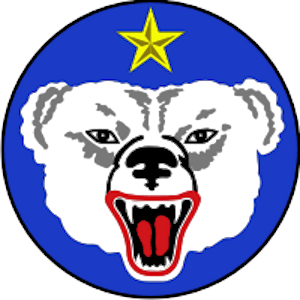
Alaskan Defense Command patch worn by the 265th while deployed to the Aleutian Islands in WWII.

== Unit designations ==
- "Escambia Rifles", an independent company (1873 - )
- Escambia Rifles, 3rd Battalion, Florida State Troops (December 31, 1887 - )
- Company A, 3rd Battalion, Florida State Troops (December 31, 1889 - )
- Company H, 1st Florida Infantry, Florida State Troops (May 23, 1898 - )
- Company I, 1st Florida Infantry (April 16, 1900 - July 23, 1905)
- Company I, 1st Florida Infantry (October 31, 1911 - March 19, 1915)
- Company I, 1st Florida Infantry (May 16, 1917 - )
- Battery D, 265th Coast Artillery (March 30, 1936 - April 15, 1940)
- Battery C, 265th Coast Artillery (April 15, 1940 - July 31, 1944)
- 982 Coast Artillery Battery (February 23, 1948 - September 1, 1949)
- Battery A, 265th Anti-Aircraft Artillery (September 1, 1949 - April 15, 1959)
- 1043 Transportation Company (April 15, 1959 - February 15, 1963)
- 268 Engineer Company (February 15, 1963 - March 1, 1964)
- Company C (Supply & Transportation), 53 Support Battalion (March 1, 1964 - January 20, 1968)
- 1043 Transportation Company (Terminal Service) (minus 1st and 2nd Shore Plts) (January 20, 1968 - September 1, 1980)
- 427 Signal Company (Cable & Wire)(September 1, 1980 - September 1, 1991)
- Headquarters & Headquarters Detachment, 417th Signal Battalion (September 1, 1991 - October 1, 1997)
- Company B, 146th Signal Battalion (October 1, 1997 - )

== Commanders ==
The following officers are known to have commanded the company during its existence:

- CPT George J. Slocumb, Commanded Escambia Rifles, circa 1873 - .
- CPT S. A. Moreno, Commanded Escambia Rifles, 1877-1878.
- CPT F. C. Brent, Commanded Escambia Rifles, 1879 - 1882.
- CPT W. F. Williams, Commanded Escambia Rifles, 1883 - 1886.
- CPT George J. Slocumb, Commanded Escambia Rifles, 1887 - circa 1888. Later commanded Chipley Light Infantry of Pensacola from 1889 - 1892.
- CPT J. Thornton Whiting, Commanded Escambia Rifles, circa 1889 - 1892.
- CPT Richard M. Bushnell, Company H, 1st Battalion, Florida State Troops, 10/30/1893 - 10/61898.
- CPT Robert W. Cobb, Company H, 1st Battalion, Florida State Troops, 10/6/1898 - .
- CPT S. M. Cross, Company I, 3rd Battalion, Florida State Troops, 4/2/1900 - .
- CPT W. F. Williams, Company I, 3rd Battalion, Florida State Troops, - 5/21/1901.
- CPT James C. Watson, Company I, 3rd Battalion, Florida State Troops, 1902 - 8/6/1903.
- CPT Archibald S. Mills, Battery D, 265 Coast Artillery, 3/1936 - 9/9/1940.
- CPT Edson E. Dailey, Commanded Battery C, 265th Coast Artillery, 9/9/1940 - .

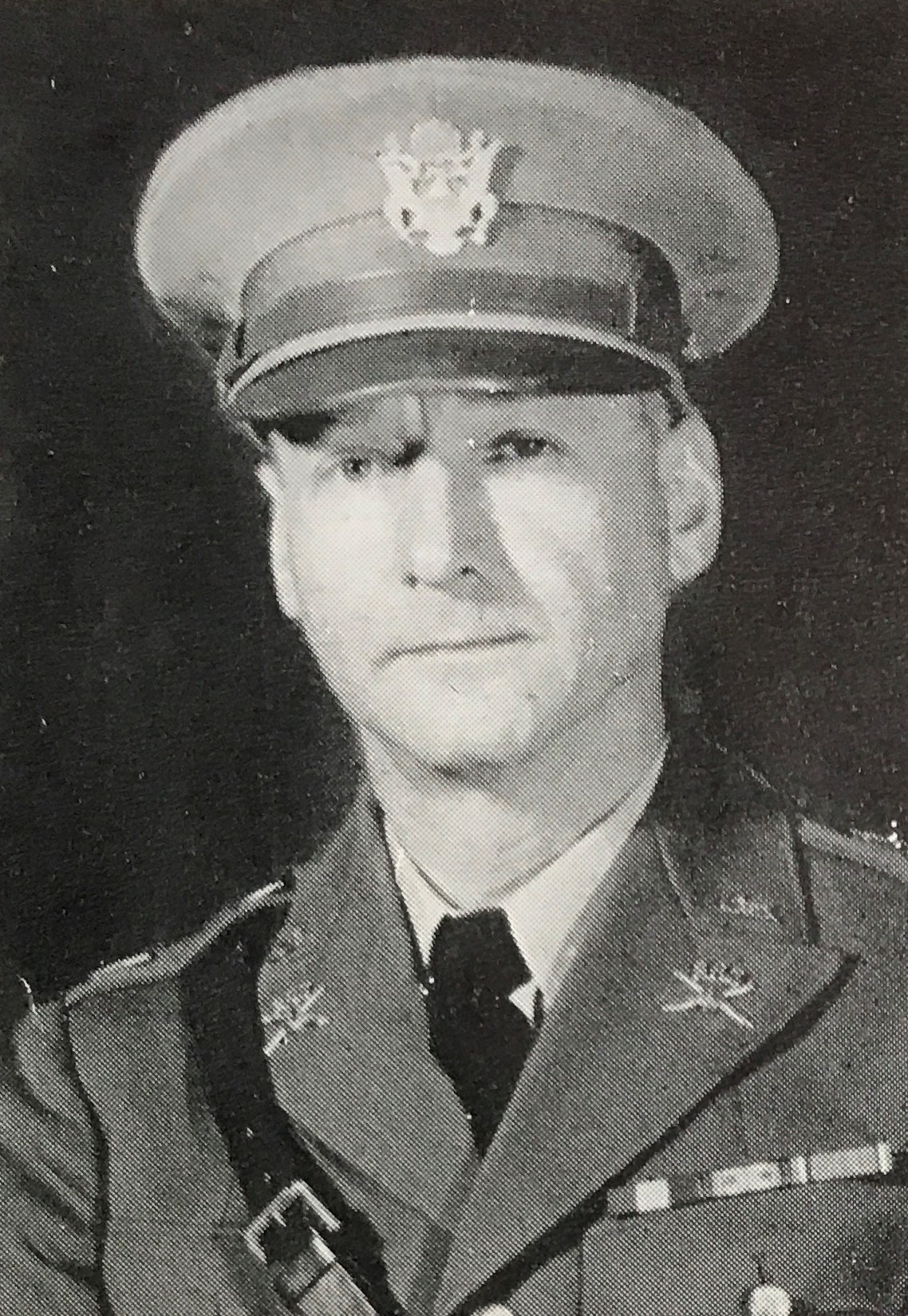
Archibald Mills, CPT, Bty D 265th Coast Artillery, 1939

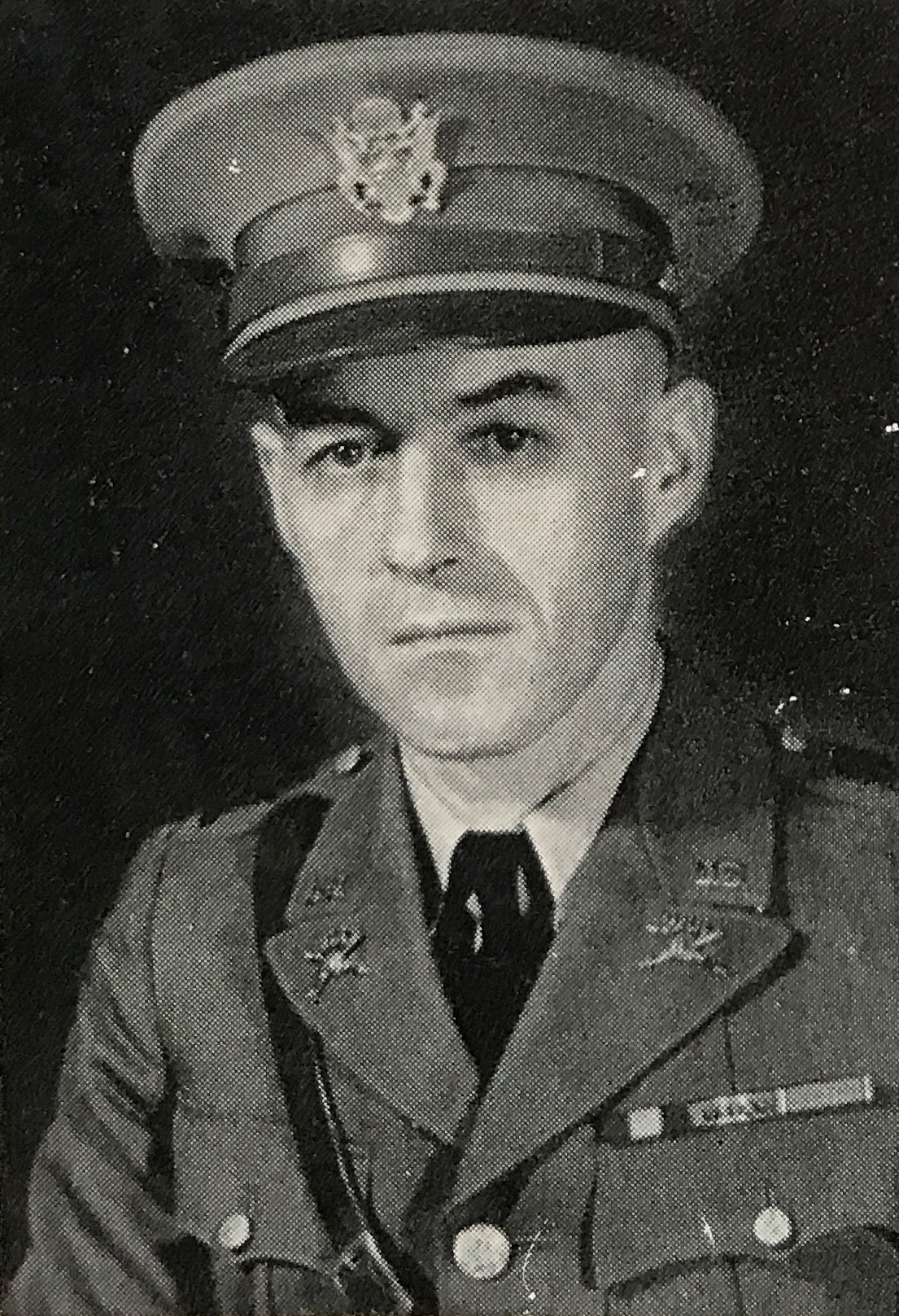
Edson E Dailey, 1LT, Bty D 265th Coast Artillery 1939

== See also ==
- Troop C, 1-153 Cavalry
- Suwannee Rifles
- Franklin Guards
- Metropolitan Light Infantry
