= Harry R. Harr =

United States Army Medal of Honor recipient

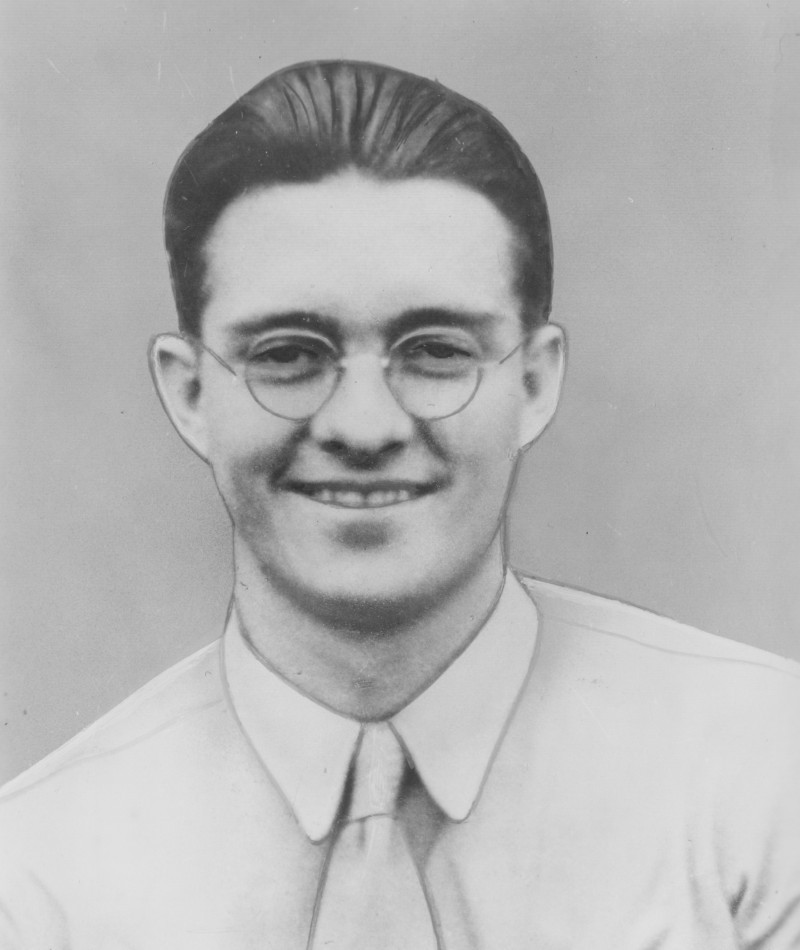
- Harr in the US Army
- Born: February 22, 1921; Pinecroft, Pennsylvania, US
- Died: June 5, 1945 (aged 24) near Maglamin, Mindanao, the Philippines
- Burial place: Alto Reste Burial Park, Altoona, Pennsylvania
- Military career
- Allegiance: United States of America
- Branch: United States Army
- Service years: 1942 - 1945
- Rank: Corporal
- Service number: 33256924
- Units: 124th Infantry Regiment, 31st Infantry Division
- Conflicts: World War II
- Awards: Medal of Honor

Harry R. Harr (February 22, 1921 – June 5, 1945) was a United States Army soldier and a recipient of the United States military's highest decoration—the Medal of Honor—for his actions in World War II.

== Biography ==
Harr joined the Army from East Freedom, Pennsylvania in November 1942, and by June 5, 1945, was a corporal in Company D, 124th Infantry Regiment, 31st Infantry Division. On that day, near Maglamin, Mindanao, the Philippines, he smothered the blast of a Japanese-thrown hand grenade with his body, sacrificing himself to protect those around him. For this action, he was posthumously awarded the Medal of Honor on March 28, 1946.

Harr, age 24 at his death, was buried in Alto Reste Burial Park, Altoona, Pennsylvania.

The CPL Harry R. Harr US Army Reserve Center in Altoona, PA is named in his honor.

== Medal of Honor citation ==
Corporal Harr's official Medal of Honor citation reads:

He displayed conspicuous gallantry and intrepidity. In a fierce counterattack, the Japanese closed in on his machinegun emplacement, hurling hand grenades, 1 of which exploded under the gun, putting it out of action and wounding 2 of the crew. While the remaining gunners were desperately attempting to repair their weapon another grenade landed squarely in the emplacement. Quickly realizing he could not safely throw the unexploded missile from the crowded position, Cpl. Harr unhesitatingly covered it with his body to smother the blast. His supremely courageous act, which cost him his life, saved 4 of his comrades and enabled them to continue their mission.

== Awards and decorations ==

Badge	Combat Infantryman Badge		
1st row	Medal of Honor		Bronze Star Medal
2nd row	Purple Heart	Army Good Conduct Medal	American Campaign Medal
3rd row	Asiatic-Pacific Campaign Medal with one bronze campaign star	World War II Victory Medal	Philippine Liberation Medal

== See also ==
- List of Medal of Honor recipients
- List of Medal of Honor recipients for World War II
- 124th Infantry Regiment (United States)
