= Franklin Guards =

- Active: 1836–1865; c. 1881–2007
- Country: United States
- Allegiance: United States
- Branch: Florida Army National Guard
- Type: Infantry and Engineer
- Size: Company
- Garrison/HQ: Apalachicola, Florida
- Nickname: "Franklin Guards"
- Engagements: Seminole Wars; Murfreesborough; Vicksburg; Chickamauga; Chattanooga; Atlanta; Franklin; Nashville; World War I World War II; Gulf War

The Franklin Guards was a unit of the Florida Army National Guard, stationed in Apalachicola. The company was founded in 1836 by Captain Abraham K. Allison as the Franklin Volunteers and fought in the Second Seminole War under General Richard K. Call's battalion of volunteers. The Territorial Legislature incorporated the company as the "Apalachicola Guards" on March 14, 1843. This act formalized their relationship with the territorial governor and afforded them territory-funded arms and equipment. During the American Civil War, the Apalachicola Guards mustered into service as Company B, 1st Florida on April 5, 1861. After the war, the company reorganized as Franklin Guards, under the command of Captain Robert Knickmeyer and Lieutenant William Orman. The Guards served as an infantry unit for most of their existence, including in the Civil War and World War I. The Guards had reorganized into an engineer company after World War I and deployed as such to the Pacific Theatre with the 31st Infantry Division in World War II. After the end of World War II, the company became an artillery and then infantry company of the 124th Infantry. It served with that unit until 1963, when it became part of the 261st Engineer Battalion as an armored engineer company. In 1968 it was reorganized into two platoons of Company C of the 3rd Battalion, 124th Infantry, and two years later became Detachment 1 of the company. After transferring to Company A in 1998, it consolidated with the company in 2007 to become Troop C, 1st Squadron, 153rd Cavalry.

== American Civil War ==
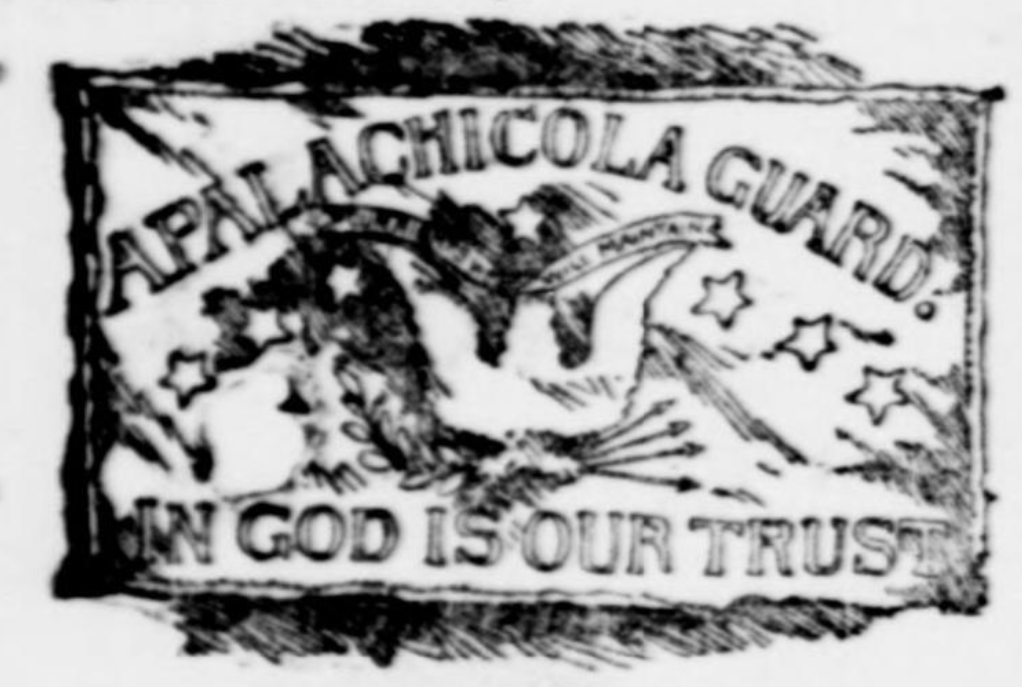
Apalachicola Guard flag used during the Civil War

The predecessor to the Franklin Guards was Company B "Apalachicola Guards," 1st Florida Infantry, mustered into Confederate service on April 5, 1861. The company was originally commanded by Captain William E. Cropp and organized from men of Apalachicola.

== Post-Civil War Reorganization through World War I ==
The Franklin Guards were established in Apalachicola shortly after the Civil War by the former commander of Company B, Fourth Florida Infantry, Captain Robert Knickmeyer as local militia company. By 1883 the Franklin Guards are listed in the Adjutant General's Report as a volunteer company under command of Captain William T. Orman with 1LT A. F. Myers. William Orman was listed as far back as 1870 as a lieutenant, presumably under Captain Knickmeyer's command. By 1885, the unit was commanded by J. H. Coombs and Fred Butterfield as a "detached company of infantry" in the Florida militia. When a vacancy in the Florida State Troops opened in 1890, the Franklin Guards were accepted as Company C, Third Battalion. On June 17, 1891, they participated in a parade for the dedication of the Confederate monument on Lee Square in Pensacola along with the rest of the battalion. The Franklin Guards were ordered to Tampa in 1898 in preparation for service during the Spanish–American War. They were one of the last four companies of state troops to arrive at the camp there on May 14, with 76 men under Captain A.S. Mohr's command. The company was released and did not enter federal service, but many individuals from the company volunteered to serve in the twelve Florida companies selected. Those that remained returned to Apalachicola on the night of 19 May. After the war, the Florida State Troops reorganized into two regiments of infantry and the Franklin Guards became Company L, First Regiment on August 18, 1899, still part of the 3rd Battalion.

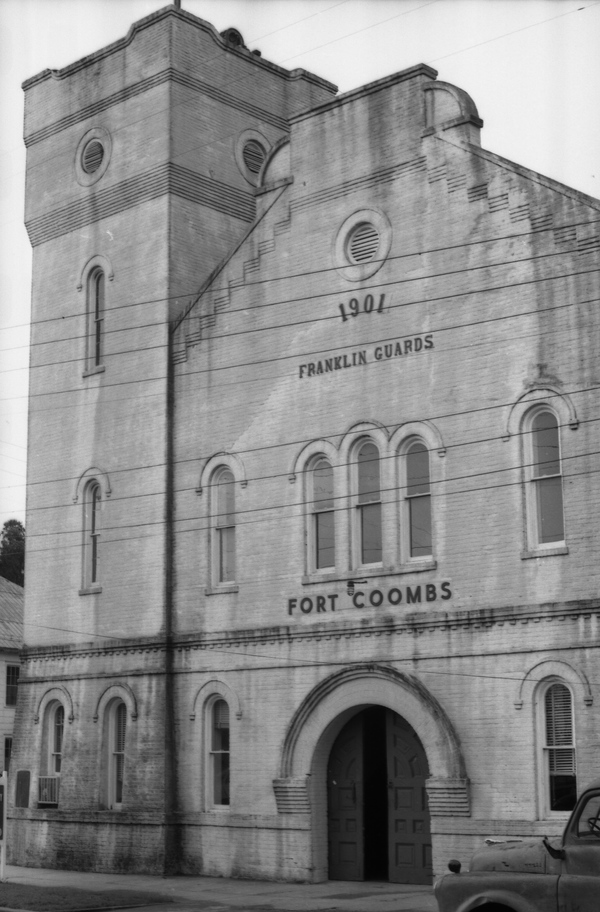
Fort Coombs Armory, built in 1901, and named in November 1951 after James Percy Coombs, a commander of the local company and later the mayor of Apalachicola.

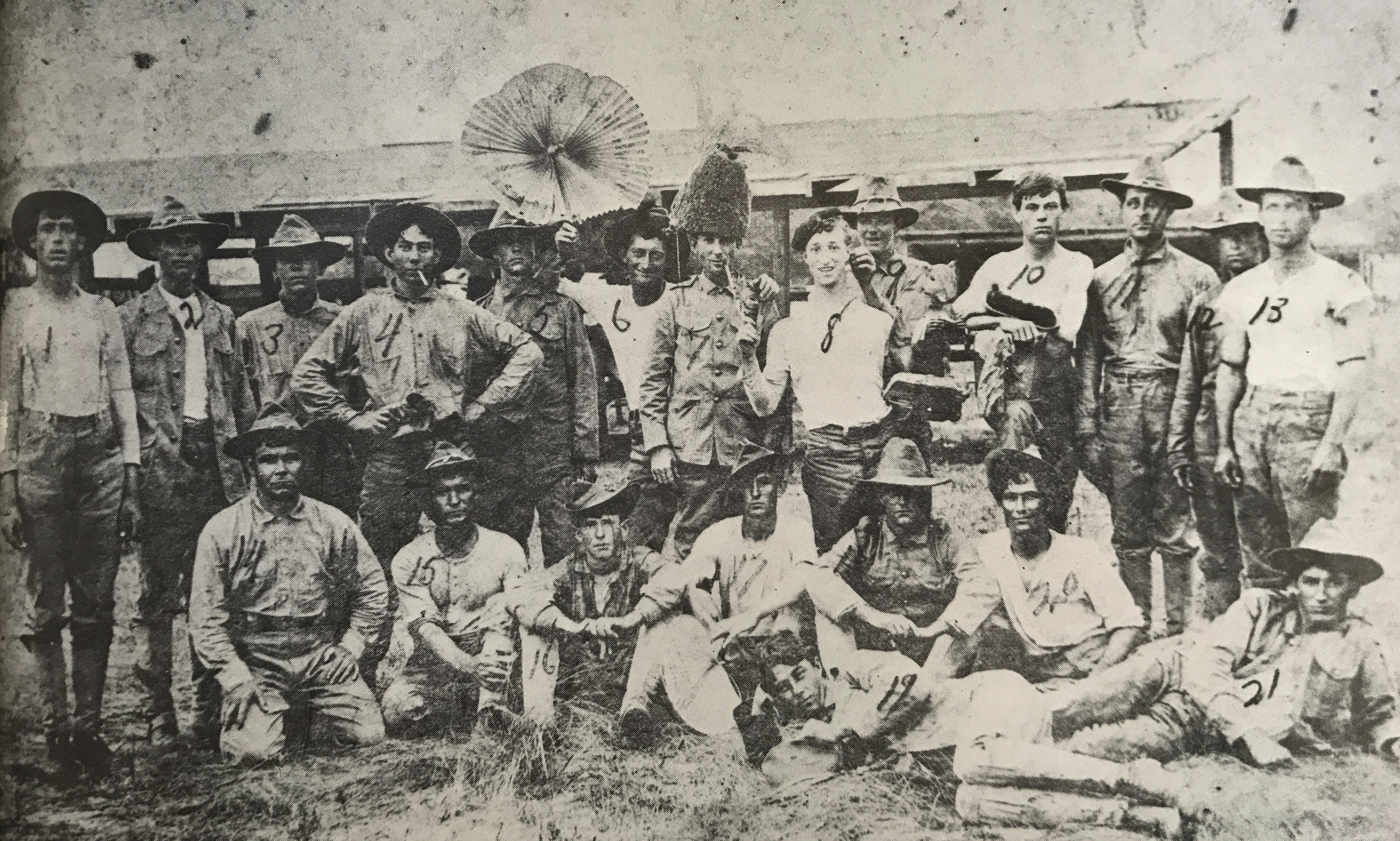
Franklin Guards of Apalachicola, Florida.

Their first permanent armory in the city was built of wood, simulated as brick, in 1898 and was destroyed by a fire that damaged much of downtown Apalachicola on May 25, 1900. A new brick armory, known as Fort Coombs after one of their commanders, was quickly completed in 1901 at the cost of $12,000 and was the home of the Franklin Guards for the rest of their service. In a 1903 report of inspection the armory was described as, "without question the finest armory in the State."

The report also described Company L and its officers and 33 men: "The ceremonies of inspection and muster were correctly executed and the company made an excellent appearance. The arms were in fair condition, and clothing clean, neat and uniform, except as to collars, of which there was a great variety of styles. Accouterments were in good condition and brasses, buttons and leather had been well polished. Proficiency in drill was shown, both in field movements and in manual of arms. Administrative work with this company is fair; money and property accounts are kept, but letter books were not posted. There is a Summary Court which is properly conducted, and discipline is good." The company encamped with all of the Florida State Troops at Camp Jennings in Jacksonville from September 8 to 15, 1903.

The Guards were called to service during street car strikes in October 1907 and in 1912. Company L entered service for World War I on August 5, 1917.

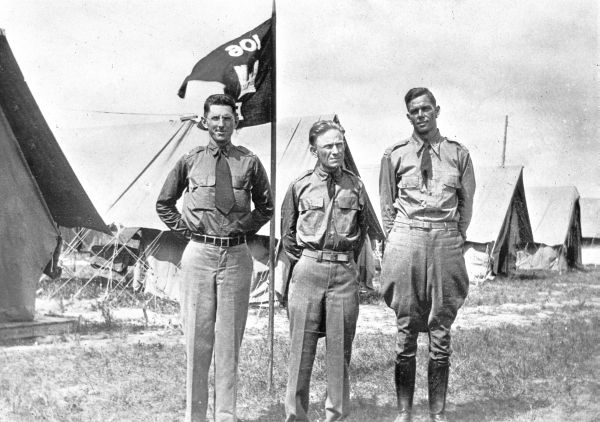
Officers of Company E, 106th Engineer Battalion circa late 1920s.

== Interwar period and World War II ==
On February 3, 1927, the Guards were reorganized as Company E, 106th Engineers, part of the engineer unit of the 31st Infantry Division. The company became part of the regiment's Florida-based 2nd Battalion. During the interwar period, Company E held regular drills at their armory every Wednesday night and participated in a two-week annual summer training camp. In 1929 they were called up to enforce the Mediterranean fruit fly quarantine at Fort Meade with road patrolling duties and on July 14 were relieved by Company A of the 124th Infantry. When the National Guard was mobilized due to World War II, the company departed Apalachicola and left Panama City by train on December 17 with four officers and 69 men. On December 18, 1940, it arrived at Camp Blanding with other units from the battalion. It later served in WWII under the 31st Infantry Division. After WWII the company was reorganized as Cannon Company, 124th Infantry, then redesignated as Heavy Mortar Company, 124th Infantry on November 1, 1948.

== Post World War II ==
On November 1, 1955, the company was redesignated Company A, 124th Armored Infantry Battalion.

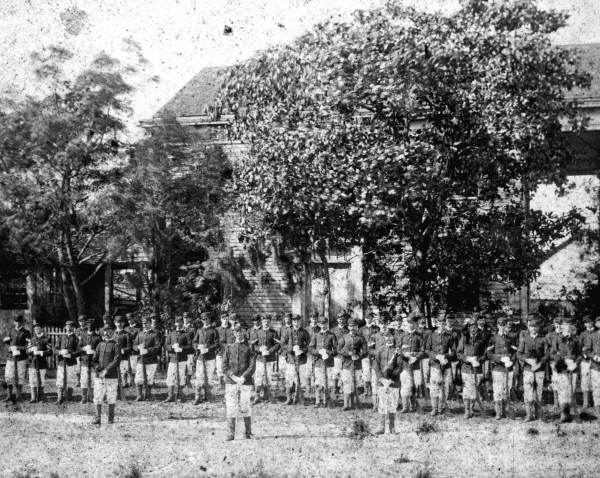
Franklin Guards standing next to David G. Raney's house in Apalachicola, Florida. Taken approx. 1890s.

In 1963 the company converted into Company A, 261st Engineer Battalion, an armored combat engineer company. The unit reorganized into second and third infantry rifle platoons of Company C, 3rd Battalion, 124th Infantry on January 20, 1968. The headquarters and 1st rifle platoon for Company C were stationed in Live Oak, and then transferred to Chipley in December of the same year. In January 1970, the unit became Detachment 1, Company C, 3rd Battalion, 124th Infantry. Then it converted to the 710th Service Company in 1981. In early 1991 the 710th Service Company mobilized at Fort Stewart before being deployed to the Persian Gulf for Operation Desert Shield. After the company returned they reorganized and converted to Detachment 1, 708 Maintenance Company in 1993. In 1996, the small company converted to Detachment 1, Company C, 3rd Battalion 124th Infantry. The detachment was realigned with Company A, 3rd Battalion, 124th Infantry out of Tallahassee in March, 1998. The detachment deployed with Company A to Iraq in 2003 and was officially consolidated with its parent company in Tallahassee to create Troop C, 1st Squadron, 153rd Cavalry on September 1, 2007.

== Unit designations ==
- "Franklin Guards", an independent company (1884 – )
- Company C, 3rd Battalion, Florida State Troops (December 31, 1890 – )
- Company L, 1st Infantry Regiment (1898 through WWI)
- Company E, 106th Engineers (February 3, 1927 – )
- Cannon Company, 124th Infantry (July 22, 1948 – )
- Heavy Mortar Company, 124th Infantry (November 1, 1948 – )
- Company A, 124th Armored Infantry Battalion (November 1, 1955 – )
- Company A, 124th Infantry (April 15, 1959 – )
- Company A, 261st Engineer Battalion (Combat) (Armored) (February 15, 1963 – )
- Company A, 261st Engineer Battalion (Combat) (Armored) (minus Engineer Plt) (May 1, 1963 – )
- 2d and 3d Rifle Platoons, Company C, 3rd Battalion, 124th Infantry (January 20, 1968 – )
- Detachment 1, Company C, 3rd Battalion, 124th Infantry (January 1, 1970 – )
- 710 Service Company (September 1, 1981 – )
- Detachment 1, 708 Maintenance Company (September 1, 1993 – )
- Detachment 1, Company C, 3d Battalion, 124th Infantry (October 1, 1996 – )
- Detachment 1, Company A, 3rd Battalion, 124th Infantry (March 1, 1998 – )
- Consolidation with Company A, 3rd Battalion, 124th Infantry to create Troop C, 1st Squadron, 153rd Cavalry (September 1, 2007)

== Commanders ==
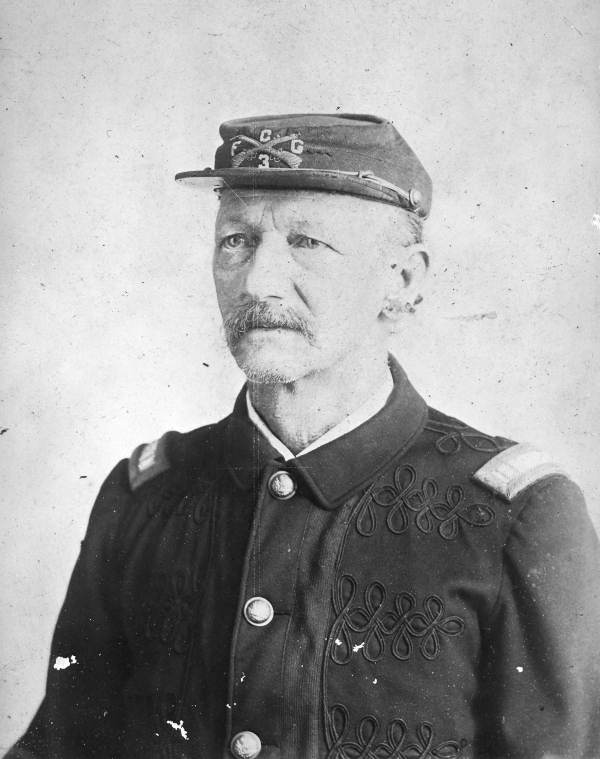
Robert Knickmeyer, commander of the company during the Civil War

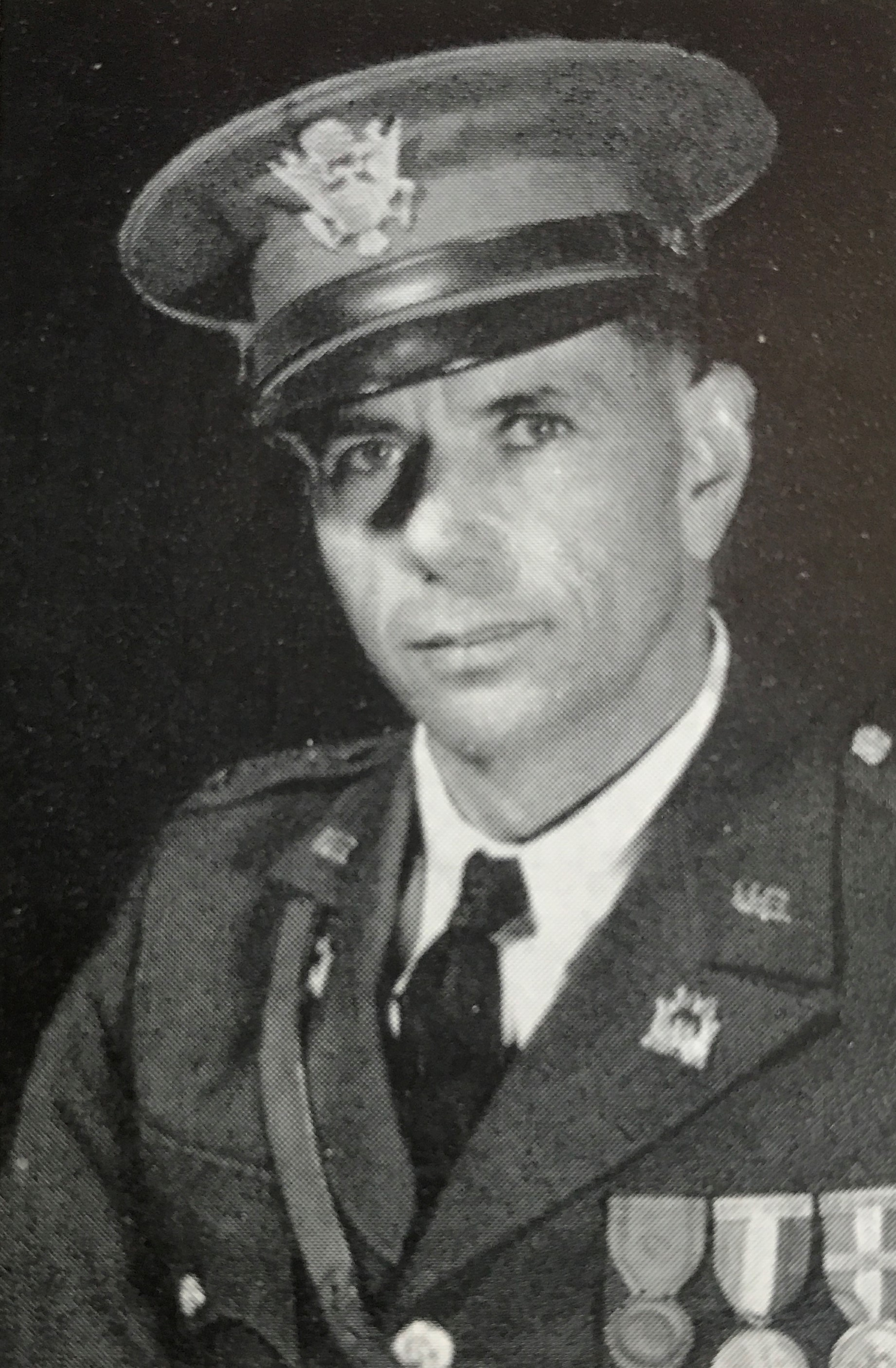
Company E 106th Engineers commander Captain Herbert O. Marshall in 1939

The following officers are known to have commanded the company during its existence:

- Captain Abraham K. Allison (1836 – )
- Captain William E. Cropp (1861 – c. 1862)
- Captain John T. Miller (c. 1862)
- Captain Robert Knickmeyer (c. 1862 – 1865, c. 1870s)
- Captain William T. Orman (c. 1881 – 1885). Previously 1LT in Company B, 1st Florida during the Civil War.
- Captain J.H. Coombs (c. 1885 – 1888)
- Captain Robert Knickmeyer (c. 1889 – 1892)
- Captain Patrick S. Hickey (1892–1894)
- Captain A.S. Mohr (September 9, 1895 – December 1899)
- Captain John P. Lovett (December 23, 1899 – November 11, 1902)
- Captain Dominick Brown (December 12, 1902 – March 20, 1904)
- Captain Thomas J. Moore (May 25, 1904 – December 20, 1905)
- Captain Joseph P. Hickey (February 6, 1906 – July 11, 1910)
- Captain J. Farley Warren (July 20, 1910 – )
- Captain R. R. Rice
- Captain James Percy Coombs (October 18, 1910 – January 7, 1915)
- Captain William J. Glasgow (March 12, 1915 – August 5, 1917)
- Captain James Percy Coombs (February 3, 1927 – May 19, 1928)
- Captain John Marshall (May 26, 1928 – Jan 27, 1929)
- Captain George A. Dodd (March 20, 1929 – November 20, 1931)
- Captain Hiram W. Sperry (November 20, 1931 – March 18, 1937)
- Captain Herbert O. Marshall (c. 1939)
- Captain Jerry Watkins (c. 1964)
