= David G. Raney House =

Historic house in Florida, United States

- U.S. National Register of Historic Places
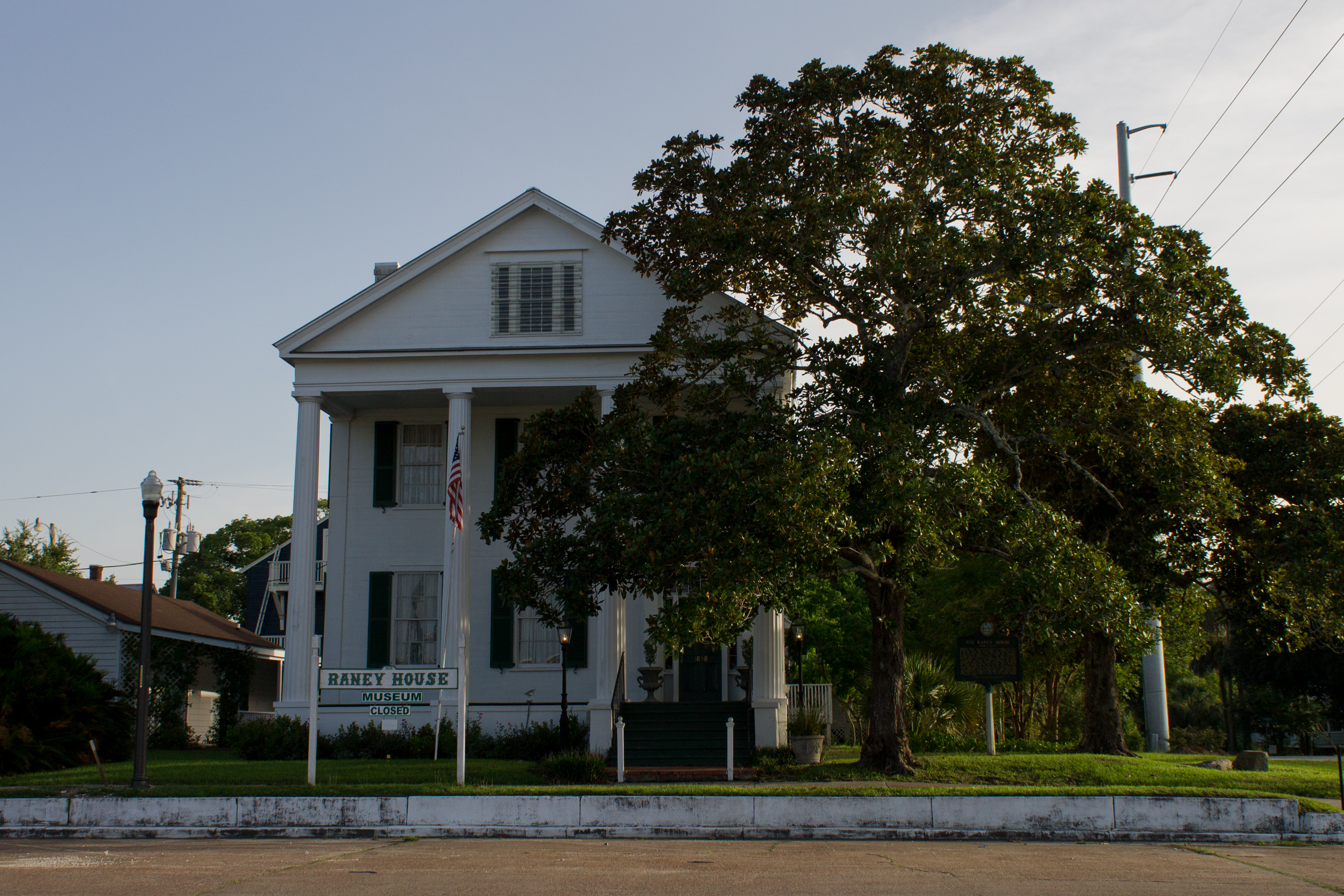

- Location within Florida Location within the United States
- Interactive map showing the location of David G. Raney House
- Location: SW corner of Market St. and Ave. F, Apalachicola, Florida
- Coordinates: 29°43′42″N 84°59′8″W
- Area: less than one acre
- Built: 1838
- Architectural style: Greek Revival
- NRHP reference No.: 72000316
- Added to NRHP: September 22, 1972

The David G. Raney House is a historic site in Apalachicola, Florida, United States, located at the southwest corner of Market Street and Avenue F. On September 22, 1972, it was added to the U.S. National Register of Historic Places.

The Apalachicola Area Historical Society operates the house as the Raney House Museum, featuring 19th century furnishings, decorations, artifacts and documents. Admission is free.
