= Suwannee Rifles =

868th Engineer Company
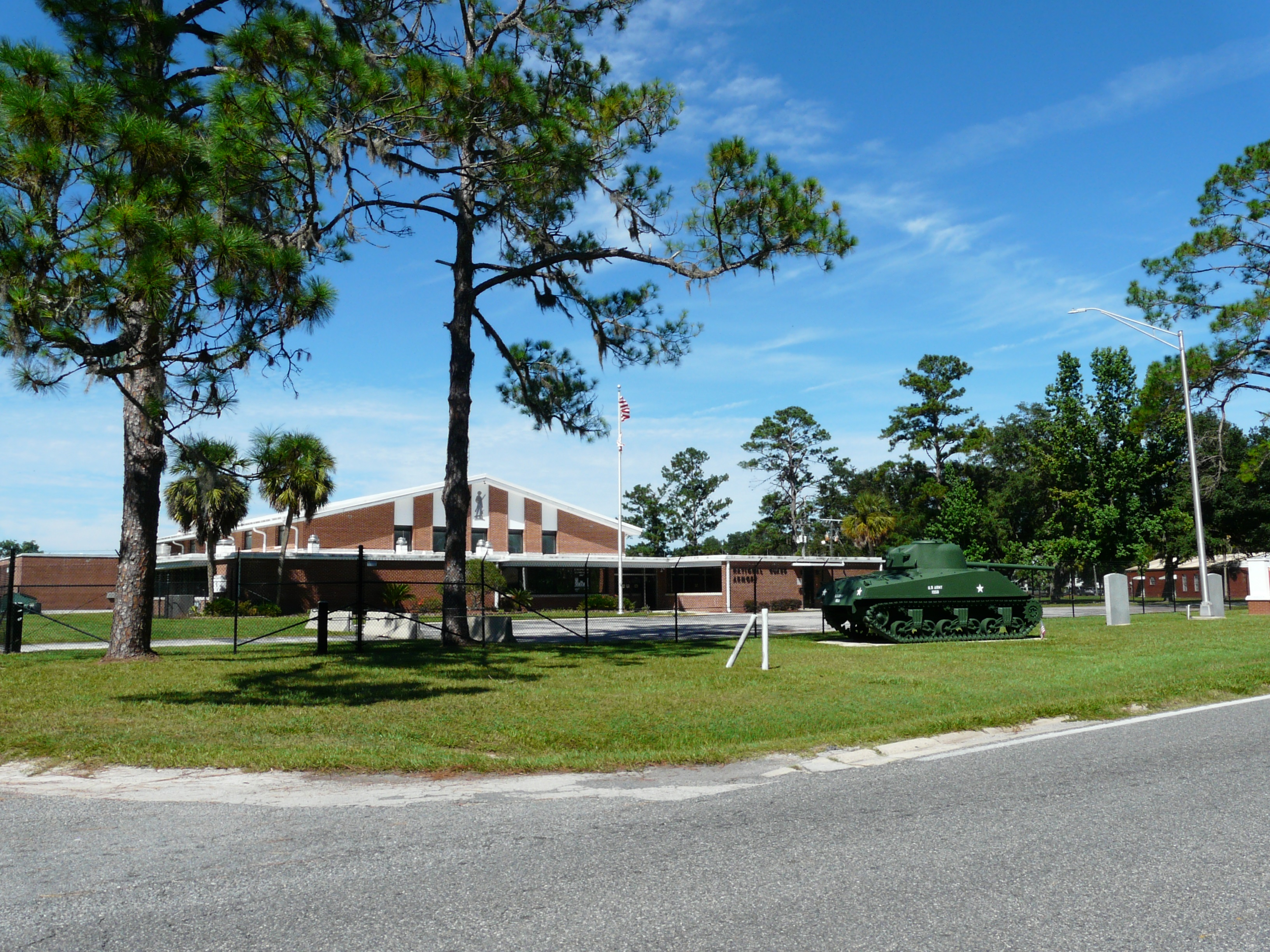
- Live Oak armory, 868th Engineer Company HQ
- Active: 1884- Accepted into Florida State Troops 1891
- Country: United States
- Branch: Florida Army National Guard
- Type: Engineer (formerly Infantry and Armor)
- Size: Company
- Garrison/HQ: Live Oak, Florida
- Nickname: "Suwannee Rifles"
- Engagements: World War II; Gulf War; Iraq War

The 868th Engineer Company "Suwannee Rifles" is a unit of the Florida Army National Guard, stationed in Live Oak, Florida. The company has one of the oldest continuous lineages in the Florida National Guard, starting out as an independent company of infantry in 1884. During its first 71 years, the Suwannee Rifles served as an infantry company and deployed as Company E, 124th Infantry during World War II. After WWII the unit reorganized again as infantry, then as an armor company for thirteen years, and since December 1968 the Suwannee Rifles has been an engineer company.

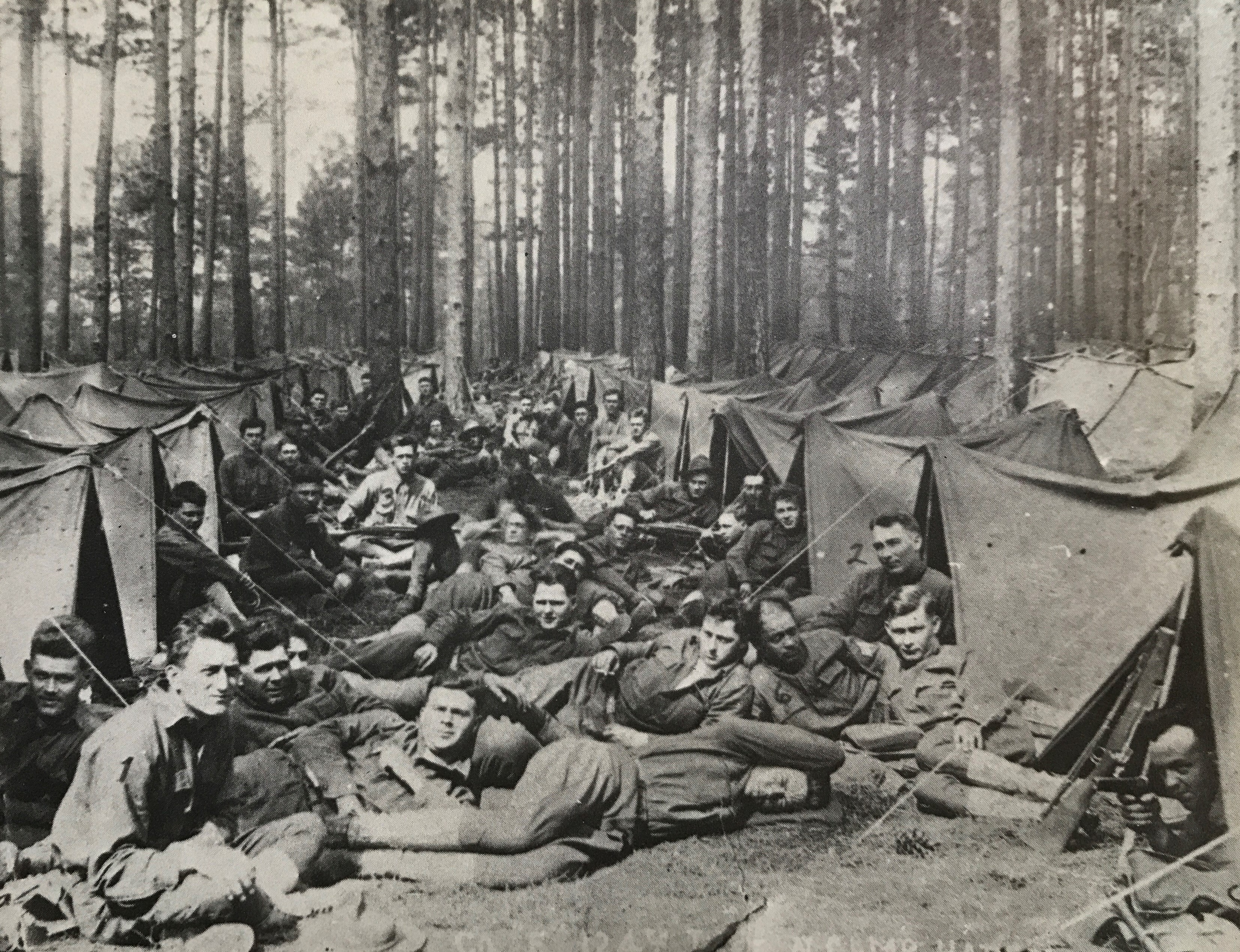
Company E, 124th Infantry on break from training.

== Founding and Spanish–American War Service ==
The Suwannee Rifles were established in 1884 in Live Oak, Suwannee County, Florida. In 1891, the Suwannee Rifles were organized in the Florida State Troops and designated Company D, 3rd Battalion of Infantry in 1892. In early 1893, L.K. Kemmerlin is listed as a lieutenant in the company. Kemmerlin was promoted to captain on 25 November 1893 and commanded the company. William L. Tedder and J. W. Price were appointed First Lieutenant and Second Lieutenant, respectively, on 27 August 1894. The unit attended Camp Dunn, Ocala in 1893 and camp at Pensacola in 1894. In 1895 the Suwannee Rifles were reorganized in the Florida State Troops as Company A, 4th Battalion. In June 1896 Captain George E. Porter assumed command while William Tedder continued as First Lieutenant. L. K. Kemmerlin was reappointed as a Second Lieutenant one year later on 27 June 1897. The Suwannee Rifles did their summer training at Camp Bloxham, Jacksonville in 1896 and then Camp Henderson, Tallahassee in 1897.

At the start of the war with Spain, the twenty companies of the Florida State Troops were ordered to Tampa. The Suwannee Rifles left Live Oak on 12 May 1898 under command of Captain William L. Tedder with 1LT L. K. Kemmerlin, 2LT Willie H. Lyle, and 2LT Archer B. Hays. The company arrived in Tampa on 13 May and encamped in the old government reservation known as the "Garrison". The Suwannee Rifles were selected among the twenty companies to constitute one of the twelve companies of the First Florida Volunteer Regiment and mustered into Federal service on 23 May, then left eh "Garrison" on 27 May and encamped at Desoto Park, Tampa. On 29 June the company detached from the Florida Regiment at Fort Brooke and marched to Tampa Heights, serving in the U.S. Siege Artillery train under Colonel Mills. Then in July, Company L was attached back to the Florida Regiment. The company left Tampa Heights on 21 July and traveled by train to Fernandina, arriving the next day. While in Fernandina, Sergeant H. M. Hicks and H. D. Puckett separately deserted the company, and one soldier was discharged for "disability". On 22 August the unit traveled via train to Huntsville, Alabama where they served until early October. While in Huntsville, the company had five more men discharged for "disability". On 9 October, they took a train to Tallahassee, arriving on 11 October. Three days later the company was given thirty days furlough and all returned to Tallahassee on 15 November. The Suwannee Rifles was mustered out 3 December 1898 in Tallahassee.

The Rifles became Company E, 1st Florida Infantry in 1899. The company was called to state active duty for the Jacksonville Fire of 1901, the Jacksonville streetcar strike from 30 October – 15 November 1912, and six other times throughout various parts of Florida. Company E, under command of Captain William H. Lyle, was commended by the Adjutant General, Maj. Gen. Clifford Foster, for its actions in mustering and entraining within thirty minutes from receiving orders to assist the Suwannee County Sheriff, J. W. Hawkins. The company took the train via the Suwannee & San Pedro Railroad and arrived at Perry to escort a prisoner back to Live Oak on the awaiting train. The company encamped with all of the Florida State Troops at Camp Jennings in Jacksonville from 8 to 15 September 1903. Company E was disbanded in late 1912.

== World War I Service ==
The Suwannee Rifles were reorganized in April 1917 as Company E, 1st Florida Infantry after the Second Florida Regiment's service on the Texas-Mexico border had ended. The reorganized company formed under command of Captain J. Hinley (who had previously commanded the unit ten years earlier) with 1LT A. E. Leslie (another former commander of Company E) and 2LT J. P. Lamb. Company E was drafted into Federal service on 5 August 1917. The company was designated 5th Company, 56th Depot Brigade and used to fill other units; primarily the 124th Infantry and 106th Engineers. Few of the men from Suwannee Rifles made it to France, none were killed in action, one man was wounded, and five men died of disease while on Federal service.

== Interwar Years and World War II ==
After all of the Florida units returned home from service in World War I, the units were reestablished in their hometowns. Former Company E, 1st Florida Infantry reorganized in Live Oak as the 3rd Separate Company of Infantry on 11 February 1920. In August, the unit was redesignated the same name, minus 2nd Platoon in Branford, Florida. It then became Company E, 154th Infantry, assigned to the 39th Infantry Division on 19 December 1921. The unit was redesignated Company E, 124th Infantry and assigned to the 31st Infantry Division on 1 July 1923. Company E participated in the Louisiana Maneuvers at Camp Beauregard from 4 August through 24, 1940 and then mobilized for one year of training at Camp Blanding on 25 November 1940 under command of CPT Mahone Rees with Lieutenants Frank M. Green, Jr., Albert E. Durrell, Louie C. Wadsworth, and 1SG Chalmer T. Yates.

The 124th Infantry was relieved from assignment to the 31st Division on 15 December 1941 and served as a model training unit for the Infantry School at Fort Benning, Georgia. The company was under command of 1LT Burnice H. Bell, with 1LT Albert E. Durrell and 2LT Marvin A. Turner and 163 enlisted men. The unit was then sent to Fort Jackson, South Carolina and inactivated 2 March 1944. By the time of their inactivation at Fort Jackson many of the original soldiers had volunteered or had been reassigned to other units. The inactivation came as a shock to many in Florida and Governor Spessard Holland appealed to the Secretary of War that the 124th Infantry be kept in service, "Its inactivation would be a severe blow to morale both in and outside the service and arouse bitterness in the hearts of many of our citizens who have served in it in the past".

The 124th Infantry was reactivated in Australia on 5 April with personnel from the 154th Infantry and reassigned to the 31st Infantry Division. The 124th Infantry experienced intense combat in New Guinea, Morotai, and Mindanao in the Southern Philippines. After the war the unit was deactivated at Camp Stoneman, California on 16 December 1945.

Florida National Guard historian Robert Hawk noted in his book: "Few, perhaps none, of Company E's men from 1940 were serving with the Regiment in 1944. They were serving and dying elsewhere. In the course of the Second World War, no unit of the Florida National Guard had more men killed, wounded in action, or dead from other causes than Company E, 124th Infantry. Thirteen men from the original company were killed in action or died of wounds and one man died of non-battle related injuries."

== Post World War II ==
After the War, the unit reorganized on 8 October 1946 in Live Oak as Headquarters Company, 1st Battalion, 124th Infantry. The unit converted on 1 November 1955 as Company A, 187th Tank Battalion, a part of the 48th Armored Division. The name changed slightly as the battalion/regiment organization changed and by 15 February 1963 it was Company A, 1st Battalion, 187th Armor, a subordinate battalion of the 53rd Separate Infantry Brigade (which soon after became the 53rd Armored Brigade).

== The Engineer Company ==
The Florida Army National Guard went through a massive reorganization in 1968, and the Suwannee Rifles became Company C, 3rd Battalion, 124th Infantry, part of the 53rd Infantry Brigade on 20 January, but less than one year later, on 1 December, the unit converted to the 269th Engineer Company.

The 269th Engineer Company was ordered into active Federal service on 21 November 1990 and released on 16 May 1991. They were again ordered into Federal service on 3 February 2003, deployed to Iraq, and was released on 19 June 2004. The Suwannee Rifles reorganized 1 September 2007 as the 868th Engineer Company.

== Unit designations ==
- "Suwannee Rifles", an independent company (1884 - )
- "Suwannee Rifles", Florida State Troops (1891 - )
- Company D, 3rd Battalion, Florida State Troops (1892 - )
- Company A, 4th Battalion, Florida State Troops (1895 - )
- Company L, 1st Florida Volunteer Infantry (23 May 1898 – 3 December 1898)
- Company E, 1st Florida Infantry (1899 - 1912)
- Company E, 1st Florida Infantry (April 1917 - )
- 5th Company, 56th Depot Brigade (1 October 1917 – 31 October 1917)
- 3rd Separate Company, Infantry (11 February 1920 – 5 January 1921)
- Company E, 1st Florida Infantry (5 January 1921 – 13 December 1921)
- Company E, 154th Infantry (13 December 1921 – 1 July 1923)
- Company E, 124th Infantry (1 July 1923 – 16 December 1945)
- Headquarters Company, 1st Battalion, 124th Infantry (8 October 1946 – 1 November 1955)
- Company A, 187th Tank Battalion (1 November 1955 – 15 April 1959)
- Company A, 1st Medium Tank Battalion, 187th Armor (15 April 1959 – 15 February 1963)
- Company A, 1st Battalion, 187th Armor (15 February 1963 – 20 January 1968)
- Company C, 3rd Battalion, 124th Infantry (20 January 1968 – 1 December 1968)
- 269th Engineer Company (1 December 1968 – 1 September 2007)
- 868th Engineer Company (1 September 2007 – Present)

== Decorations ==
Ribbon	Award	Streamer embroidered	Order No.
Dark blue ribbon with a gold border	Presidential Unit Citation (Army)	MINDANAO	
	Philippine Presidential Unit Citation	17 OCTOBER 1944 TO 4 JULY 1945	Department of the Army General Order 47-50
Red ribbon	Meritorious Unit Commendation	SOUTHWEST ASIA	
Red ribbon	Meritorious Unit Commendation	IRAQ 2003	

== Commanders ==
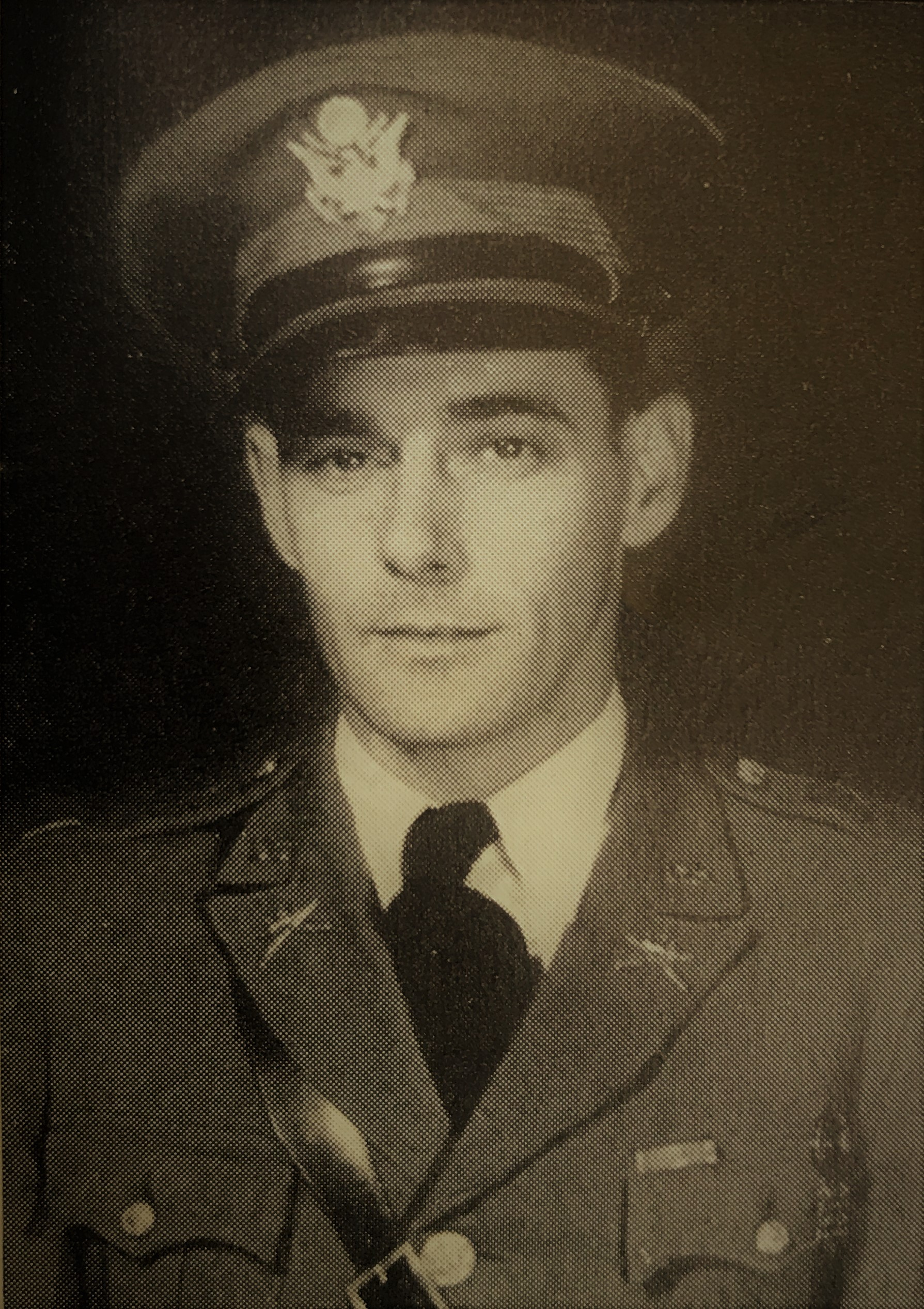
Captain Mahone Rees, Jr. circa 1939 mobilized Company E for WWII.

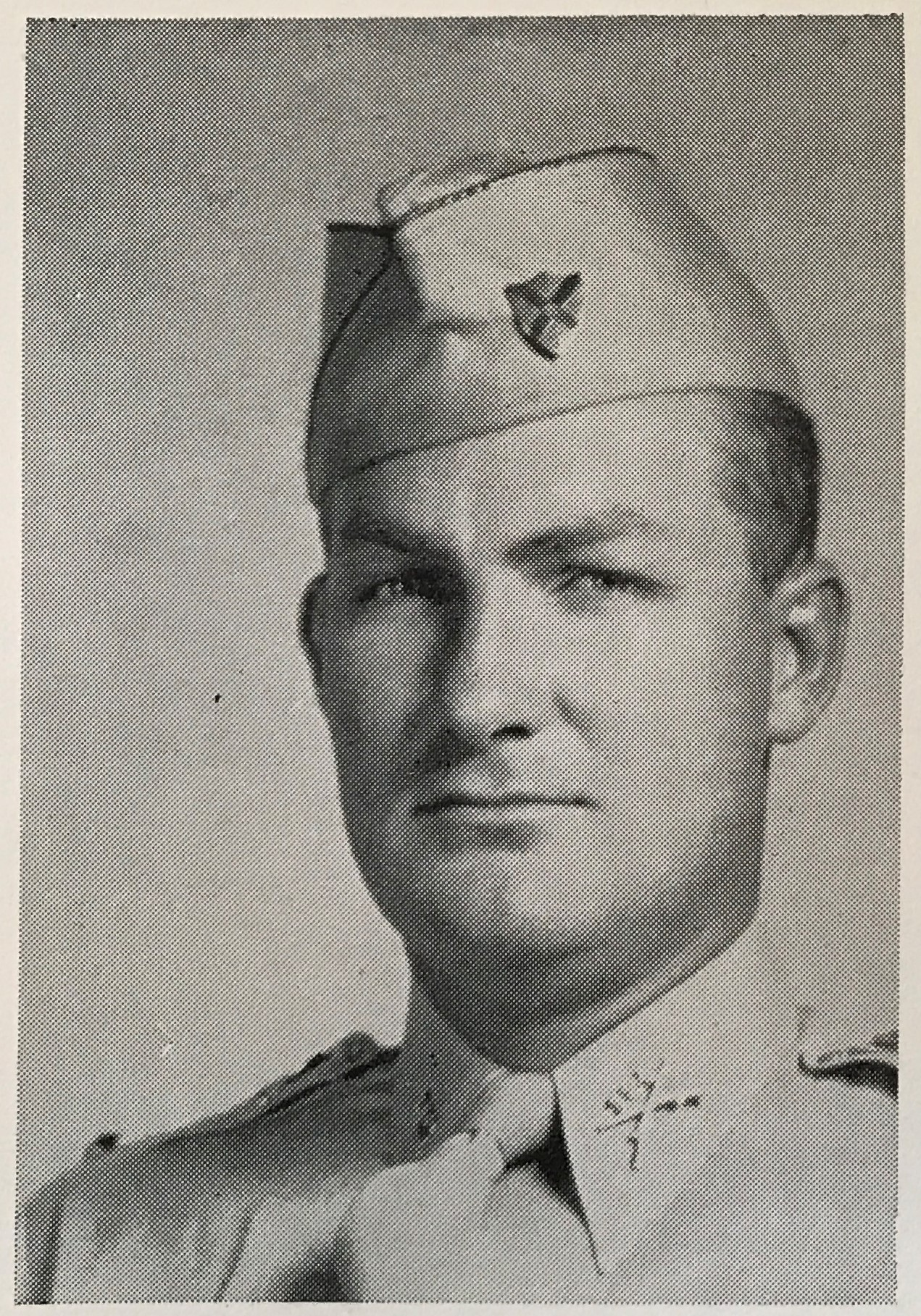
Captain Burnice Bell, circa 1940 commanded Company E during WWII.

The following officers are known to have commanded the company during its existence:

- C. H. Tedder, Company D, 3rd Battalion, Florida State Troops (c. 1889–1892)
- L. K. Kemmerlin, Company D, 3rd Battalion, Florida State Troops (c. 1893-6/22/1896)
- George E. Porter, Company A, 4th Battalion, Florida State Troops (6/22/1896-)
- William L. Tedder, Company L, 1st Florida Volunteer Regiment (1898)
- W. H. Lyle, Company E, 1st Florida Infantry (10/1/1900-1904).
- A. E. Leslie, Company E, 1st Florida Infantry (7/9/1907-)
- W. H. Lyle, Company E, 1st Florida Infantry (2/12/1908-)
- J. Hinley, Company E, 1st Florida Infantry (7/30/1910-1912) (disbanded)(1917-)
- Yandell O. Brown, 3rd Separate Company of Infantry (2/11/1920-)
- Bernard L. Rhodes, Company E, 154th Infantry (5/18/1921-)
- Robert G. White, Company E, 124th Infantry (2/26/1923-)
- Mahone Rees, Jr., Company E, 124th Infantry (1/29/1935-circa 1940)
- Burnice H. Bell, Company E, 124th Infantry (c. 1940)
- Samuel J. White, Company E, 124th Infantry (10/8/1946-)
- Spessard Boatright, Co.A 1/187th Armor, 53rd AR Bde.(27Jan66-19Jan68)
- Spessard Boatright, Co. C 3/124th Infantry (20Jan68-30Nov68)
- Spessard Boatright, 269th Engr Co (Dp Trk) (1Dec68-31Jan72)
- Spessard Boatright, 269th Engr Co (Const Spt) (1Feb72-4Feb73)
- Elizabeth A. Evans, 868th Engineer Co. (07/2006 - 10/2008)
- Terry M. Giles, 868th Engineer Co. (11/2008-2/2010)
