= Michael Calhoun =

Michael Calhoun may refer to:

- Michael A. Calhoun (born 1954), American military officer
- Mike Calhoun (1957–1997), American football player
- Mike Calhoun (quarterback) (born 1961), American football player
