= Emmett R. Titshaw Jr. =

United States Air Force general

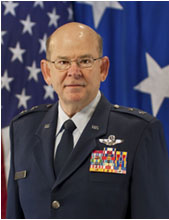
- Emmett R. Titshaw, Jr.
- Military career
- Allegiance: United States
- Branch: United States Air Force
- Service years: 1970–2015
- Rank: Major General
- Commands: Florida National Guard; Air National Guard; 125th Fighter Interceptor Group; 159th Fighter Interceptor Squadron
- Awards: Air Force Distinguished Service Medal; Legion of Merit (2)

Major General Emmett R. Titshaw, Jr. is a retired officer in the United States Air Force and the Air National Guard of the United States. He was the acting director of the Air National Guard from 17 November 2008 to 2 February 2009. He later served the Adjutant General for the State of Florida until his retirement from military service in March 2015.

== Awards and decorations ==
US Air Force Command Pilot Badge
Headquarters Air Force Badge

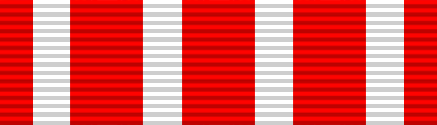
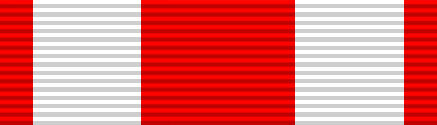
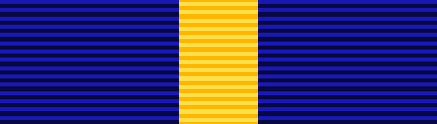
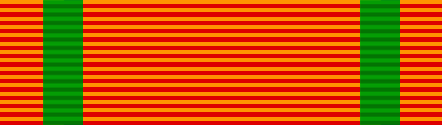
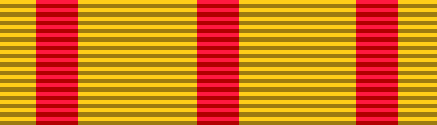
Air Force Distinguished Service Medal
Legion of Merit with one bronze oak leaf cluster
Meritorious Service Medal with 1 Oak Leaf Cluster
Air Force Commendation Medal
Air Force Achievement Medal
Air Force Outstanding Unit Award with 2 Oak Leaf Clusters
Air Force Organizational Excellence Award
Combat Readiness Medal with 1 Silver and 2 Bronze Oak Leaf Clusters
National Defense Service Medal with two bronze service stars
Global War on Terrorism Service Medal
Armed Forces Service Medal
Humanitarian Service Medal with 1 Service Star
Air Force Expeditionary Service Ribbon with 1 oak leaf cluster
Air Force Longevity Service Award (with 1 Silver and 3 Bronze Oak Leaf Clusters)
Armed Forces Reserve Medal with gold hourglass device
Air Force Training Ribbon
Florida Cross with 1 Oak Leaf Cluster
Florida Distinguished Service Medal
Florida Meritorious Service Medal
Florida Service Ribbon with 1 Silver and 1 Bronze Oak Leaf Cluster
Florida Active State Duty Ribbon with 1 oak leaf cluster
Florida Recruiting Ribbon with 1 Oak Leaf Cluster

== Flight Information ==
- Rating: Command Pilot
- Flight Hours: More than 4,500
- Aircraft flown: F-15, F-16, C-131, F-106, F-102, T-38, T-37
- Pilot wings from: Columbus Air Force Base, Mississippi

== Assignments ==
- November 1970 – February 1972, Student, Undergraduate Pilot Training, 3650th Pilot Training Wing, Columbus Air Force Base, Mississippi
- February 1972 – February 1979, Pilot, 159th Fighter Interceptor Squadron, Jacksonville Air National Guard Base/Jacksonville International Airport, Florida
- February 1979 – June 1984, Air Operations Officer, 125th Fighter Interceptor Group, Jacksonville ANGB/Jacksonville International Airport, Florida
- June 1984 – April 1988, Flight Commander, F-106, 159th Fighter Interceptor Squadron, Jacksonville ANGB/Jacksonville International Airport, Florida
- April 1987 – April 1988, Operations Officer, 159th Fighter Interceptor Squadron, Jacksonville ANGB/Jacksonville International Airport, Florida
- April 1988 – November 1989, Commander, 159th Fighter Interceptor Squadron, Jacksonville ANGB/Jacksonville International Airport, Florida
- December 1989 – May 1990, Deputy Commander for Operations, 125th Fighter Interceptor Group, Jacksonville ANGB/Jacksonville International Airport, Florida
- May 1990 – May 1991, Commander, 125th Fighter Interceptor Group, Jacksonville ANGB/Jacksonville International Airport, Florida
- May 1991 – May 1995, Director of Operations, Headquarters, Florida Air National Guard, St. Francis Barracks, Saint Augustine, Florida
- May 1995 – July 2001, Chief of Staff, Headquarters, Florida Air National Guard, St. Francis Barracks, Saint Augustine, Florida
- August 2001 – July 2006, Assistant Adjutant General-Air, Florida National Guard, St. Francis Barracks, Saint Augustine, Florida
- August 2006 – June 2008, Air National Guard Assistant to Commander, Air Combat Command, Langley Air Force Base, Virginia
- June 2008 – November 2008, Special Assistant to the Director, Air National Guard, Arlington, Virginia
- November 2008 – January 2009, Acting Director, Air National Guard, Arlington, Virginia
- January 2009 – June 2010, Special Assistant to the Director, Air National Guard, National Guard Bureau, Arlington, Virginia
- June 2010 – March 2015, The Adjutant General, Florida, Florida Joint Force Headquarters, St. Francis Barracks, St. Augustine, Florida

Military offices
Preceded by Craig R. McKinley	Director of the United States Air National Guard; Acting; 2008–2009	Succeeded by Harry M. Wyatt III
