= Florida National Guard =

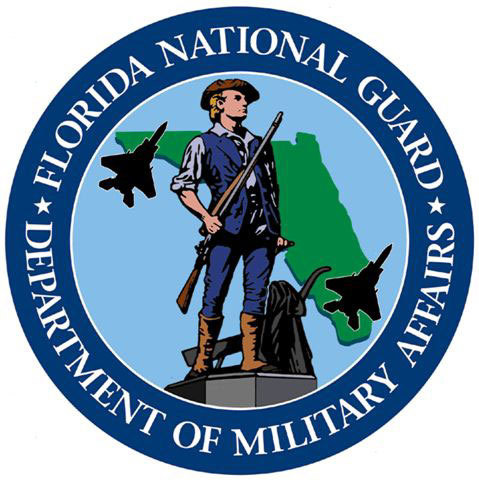
- Seal of the Florida National Guard
- Active: 1861–present
- Country: United States
- Allegiance: United States; Florida
- Branch: United States Army; United States Air Force; National Guard of the United States
- Type: Joint
- Role: Federal Reserve Force; State Militia (Militia Act of 1903)
- Size: Approximately 12,000 Soldiers and Airmen.
- Garrison/HQ: St. Augustine, Florida

Commanders
- Commander-in-Chief (Title 10 USC): President of the United States (federalized)
- Commander-in-Chief (Title 32 USC): Governor of Florida
- Adjutant General: Major General John D. Haas
- Assistant Adjutant General – Army: Major General Robert G. Carruthers, III
- Assistant Adjutant General – Air Force: Brigadier General Richard L. Coffey III
- Command Senior Enlisted Leader: Command Sergeant Major James B. Kendrick

The Florida National Guard is the National Guard force of the state of Florida. It comprises the Florida Army National Guard and the Florida Air National Guard.

The United States Constitution charges the National Guard with dual federal and state missions. Ordinarily under the control of the state government (in which the governor is the commander-in-chief) pursuant to Title 32 of the United States Code, National Guard troops may also be called into active federal service with the United States Army or the United States Air Force (in which the president serves as commander-in-chief) and deployed worldwide with their active duty Army and Air Force counterparts.

The Florida National Guard, like those of other states, provides trained and equipped units for prompt mobilization in case of war or national emergency. Guardsmen may take part in functions ranging from limited actions in non-emergency situations to full-scale law enforcement (martial law) in cases when the governor determines that ordinary law enforcement officials can no longer maintain civil control. The state mission assigned to the National Guard is "to provide trained and disciplined forces for domestic emergencies or as otherwise provided by state law." The Florida National Guard serves as the state's "defense force".

Florida currently has a State Defense Force (SDF), reactivated as of 2022. During World War II, the Florida State Guard served as the official state defense force of Florida, and was organized as a stateside replacement for the Florida National Guard and executed the stateside duties of the National Guard for the duration of the war. National coordination of various state National Guard units are maintained through the National Guard Bureau.

== Commanders ==
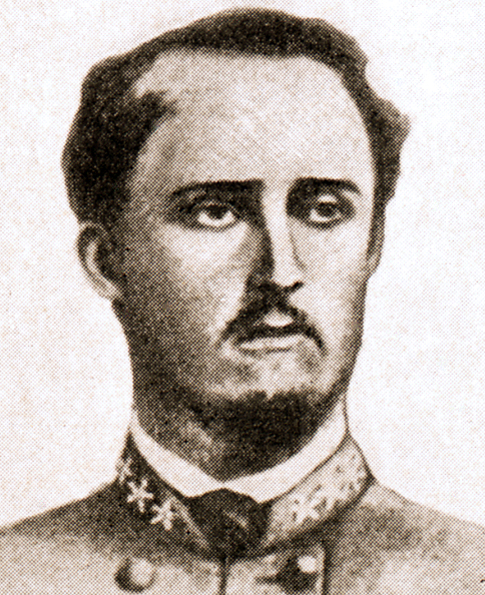
Theodore W. Brevard, 9 June 1860 to 8 July 1861 (resigned)

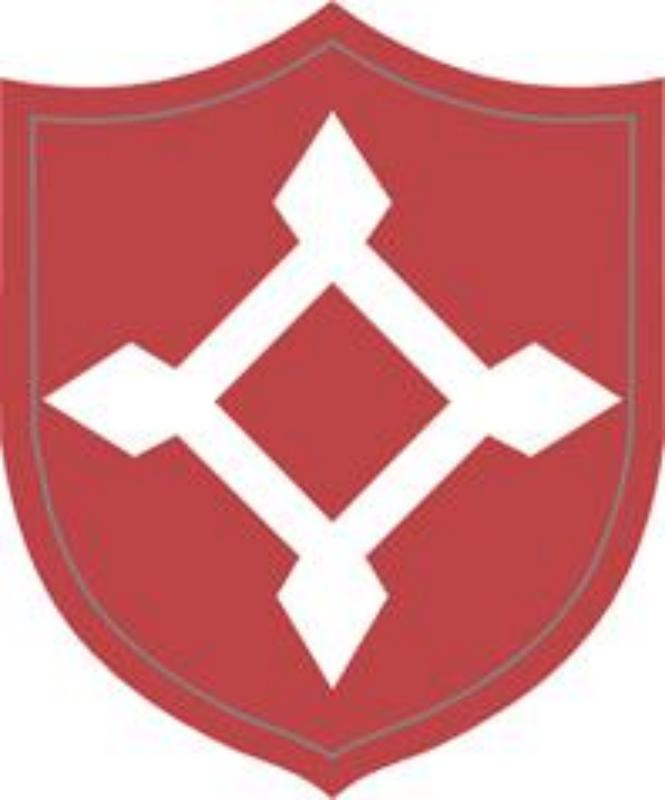
William H. Milton, 1861, to 1863

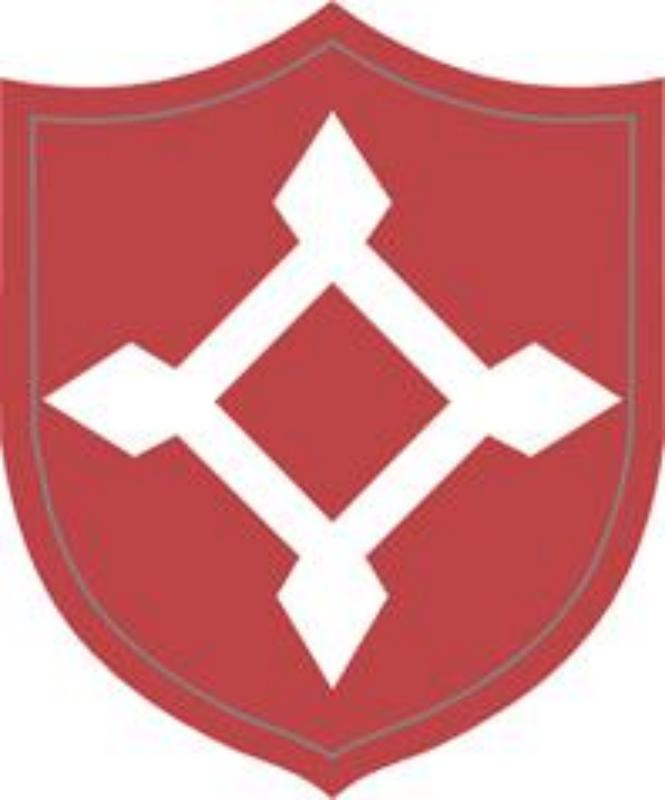
Hugh Archer Jr., January 1863 to 1868

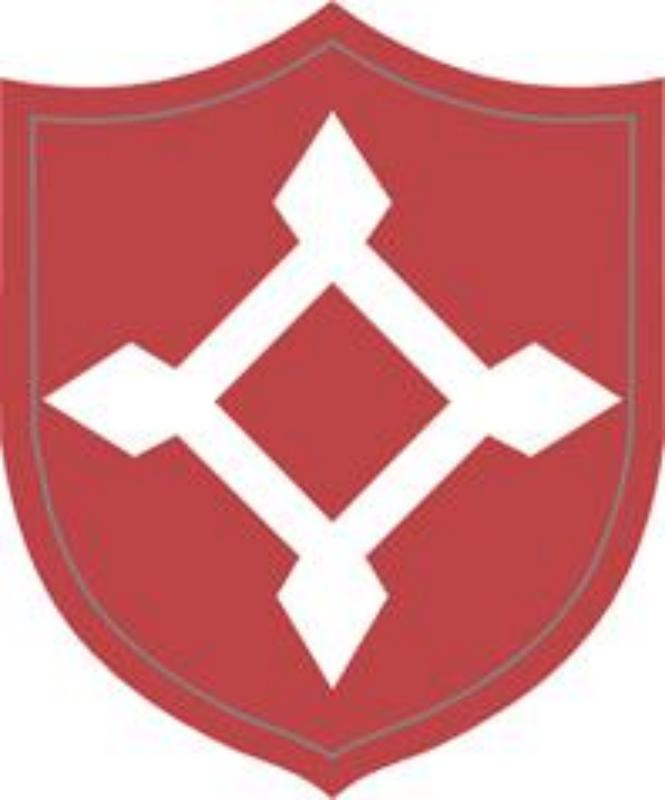
Horatio Jenkins Jr., 9 July 1868 to 4 August 1868

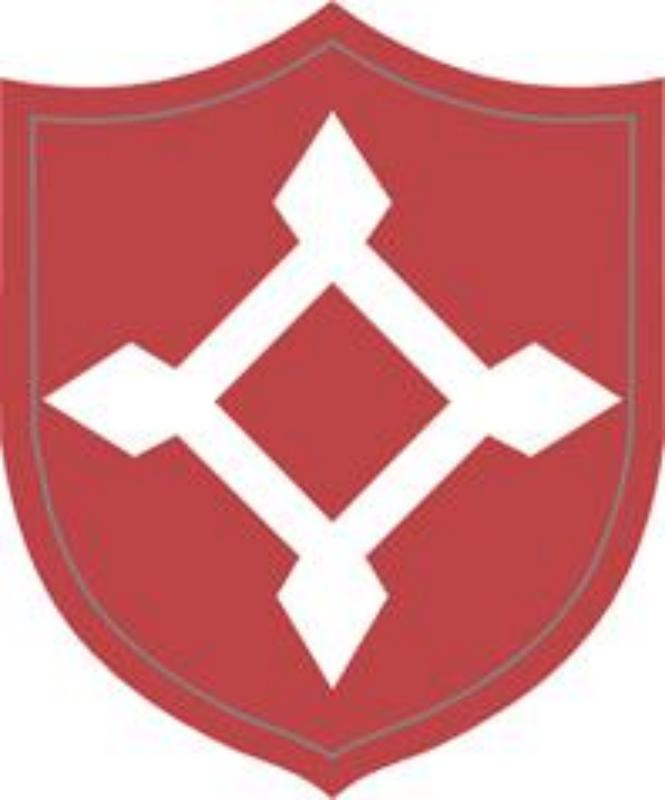
Georgi B. Cane, 5 August 1868 to 20 February 1870 (resigned)

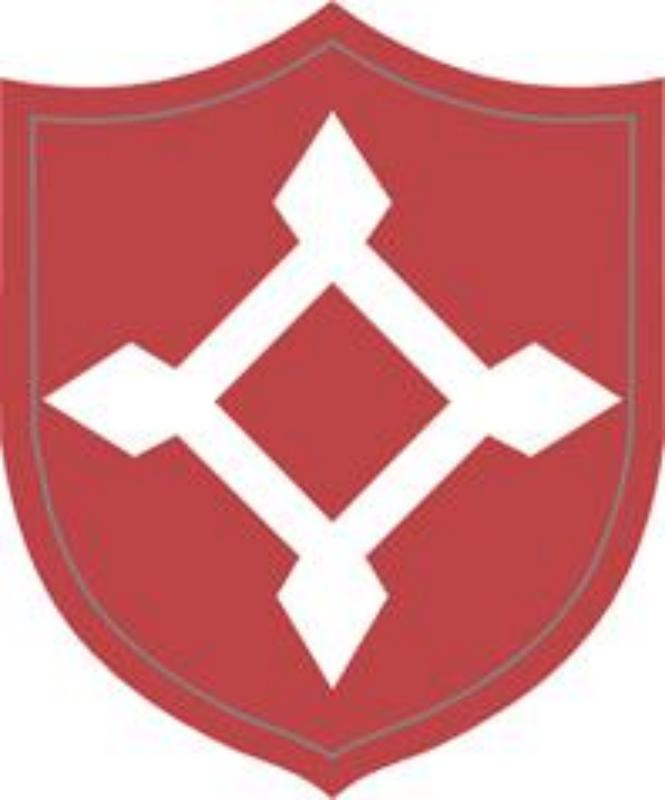
John Vamum, 21 February 1870 to 4 March 1877

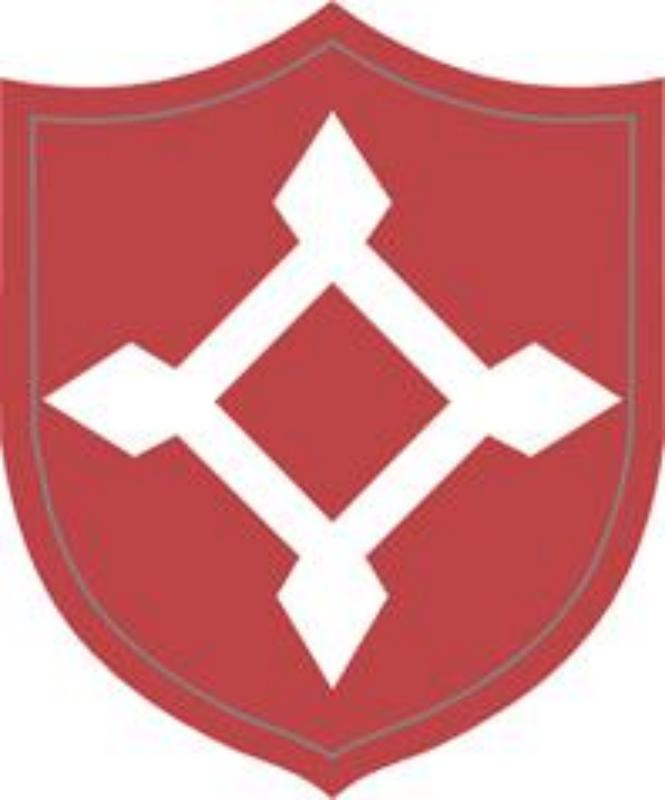
John J. Dickison, 5 March 1877 to 16 January 1881

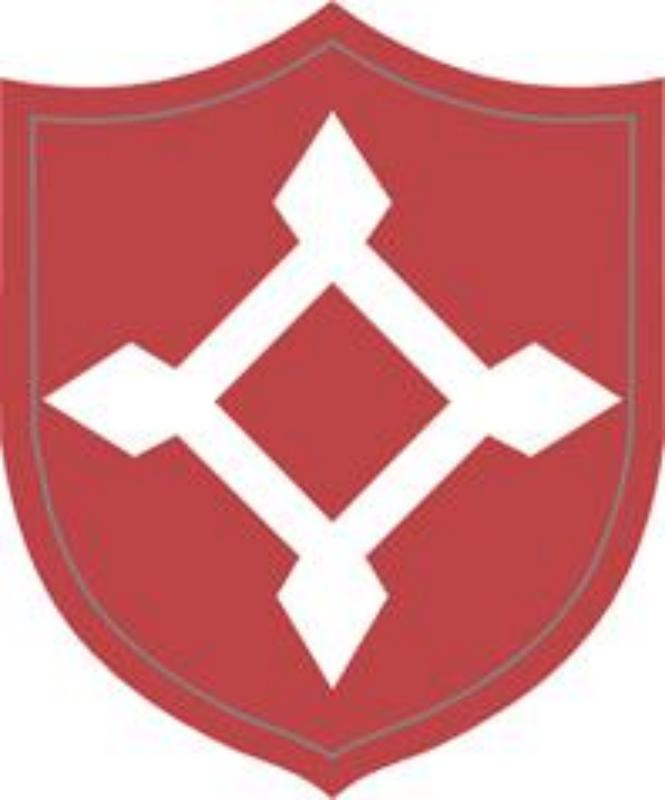
James E. Yonga, 17 January 1881 to 16 January 1885

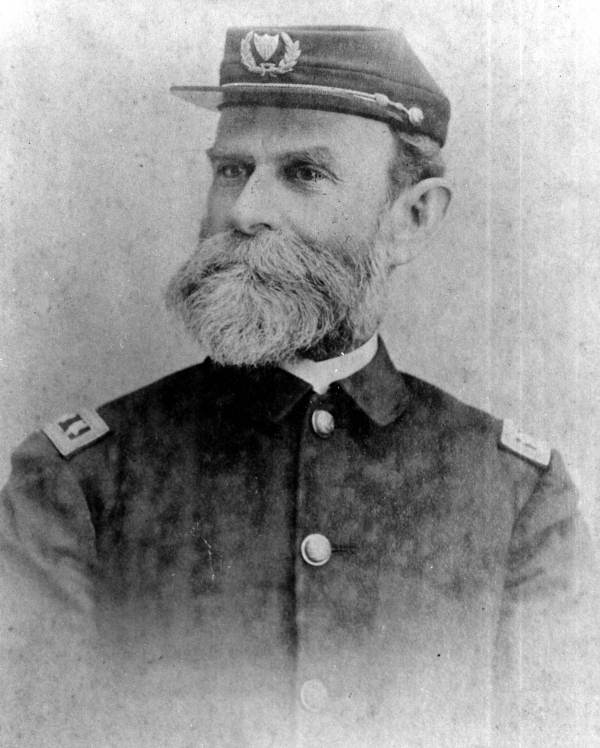
David Lang, 17 January 1885 to 4 December 1893

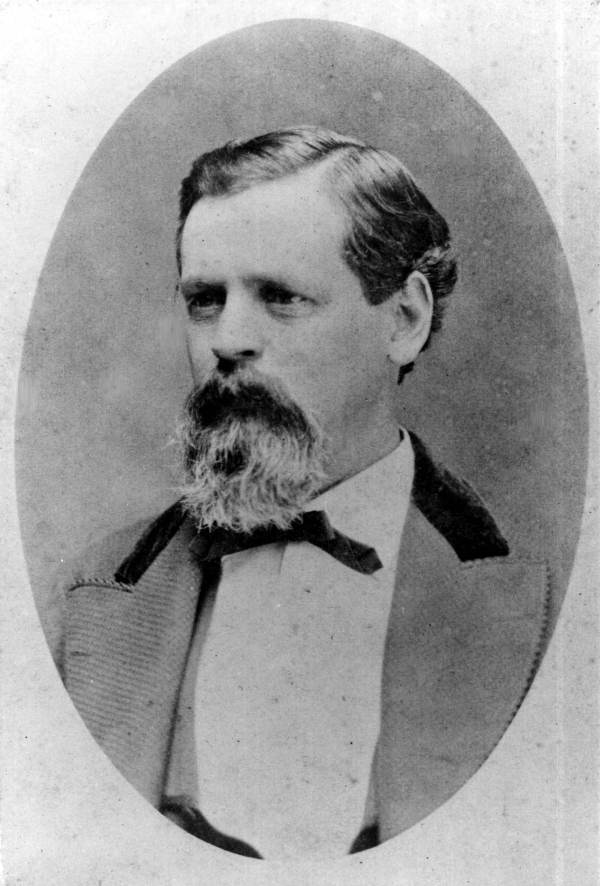
Patrick Houstoun, 5 December 1893 to 6 May 1901 (died in office)

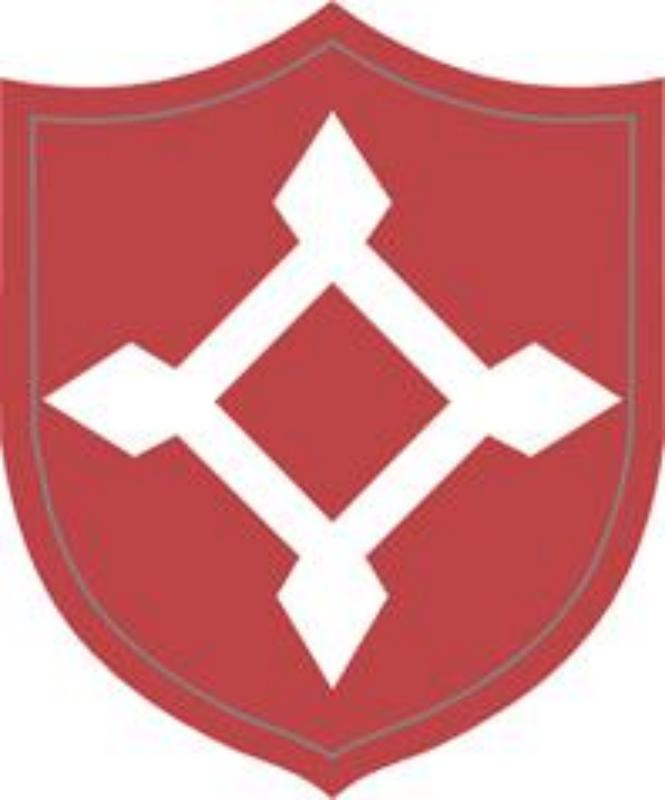
William A. MacWilliams, 7 May 1901 to 28 June 1901 (resigned)

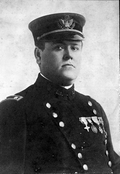
J. Clifford R. Foster, 29 June 1901 to 9 January 1917

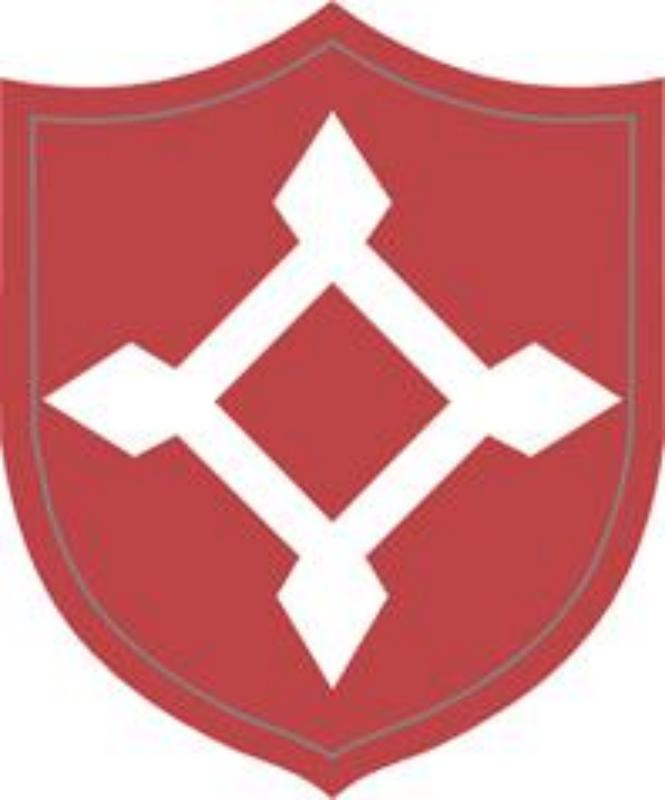
J. B. Christian, 10 January 1917 to 29 March 1919

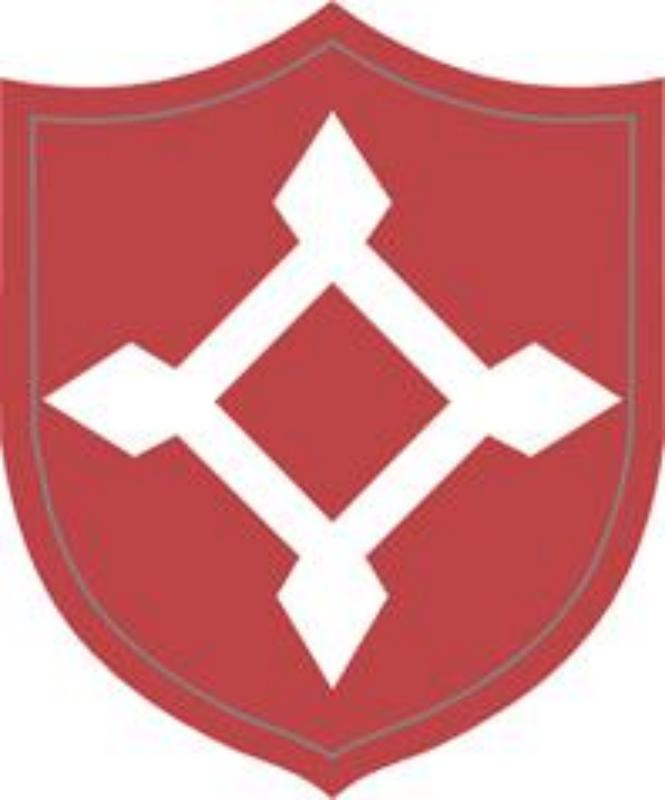
James McCants, 30 March 1919 to 31 August 1919 (resigned)

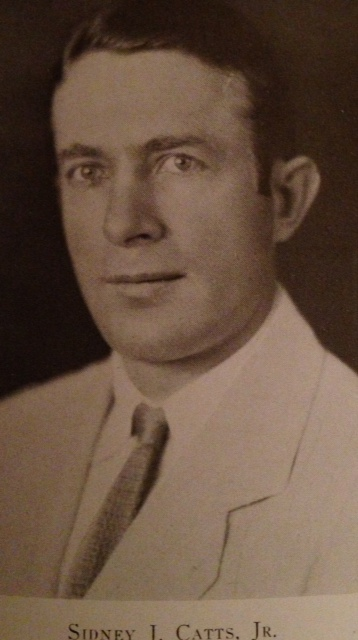
Sidney J. Catts Jr, 1 September 1919 to 3 January 1921 (resigned)

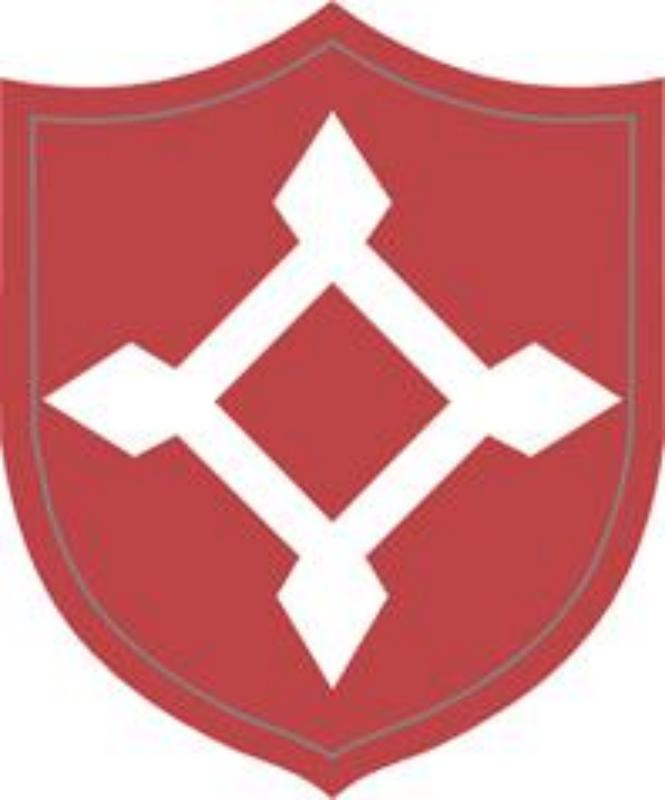
Charles P. Lovell, 4 January 1921 to 25 January 1923 (died in office)

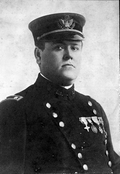
J. Clifford R. Foster, 23 February 1923 to 18 June 1928 (died in office)

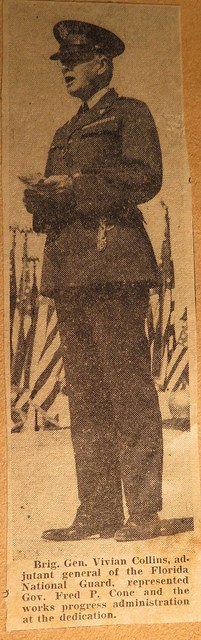
Vivian Collins, 29 June 1928 to 15 April 1947

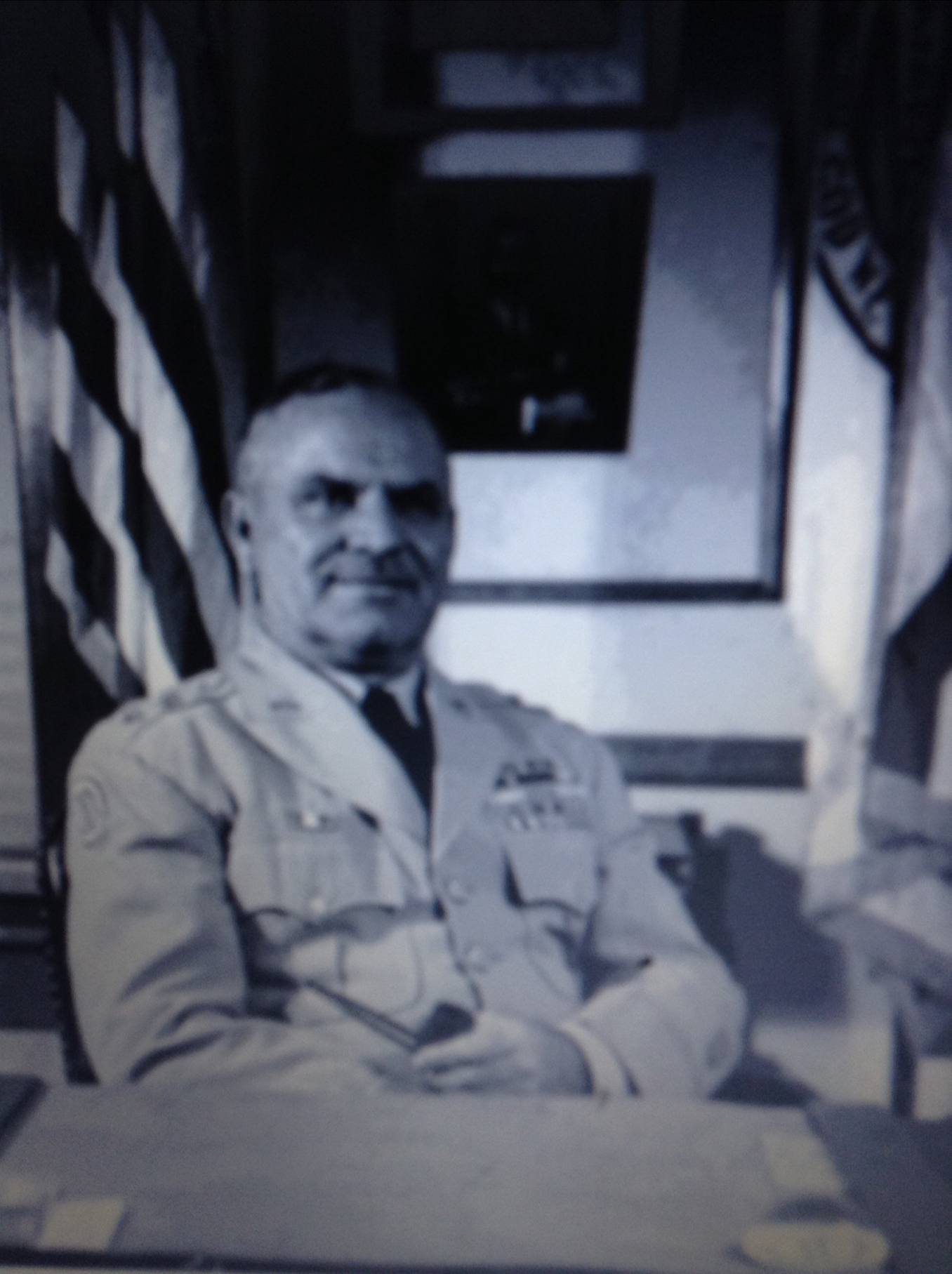
Mark W. Lance, 16 April 1947 to 27 April 1962

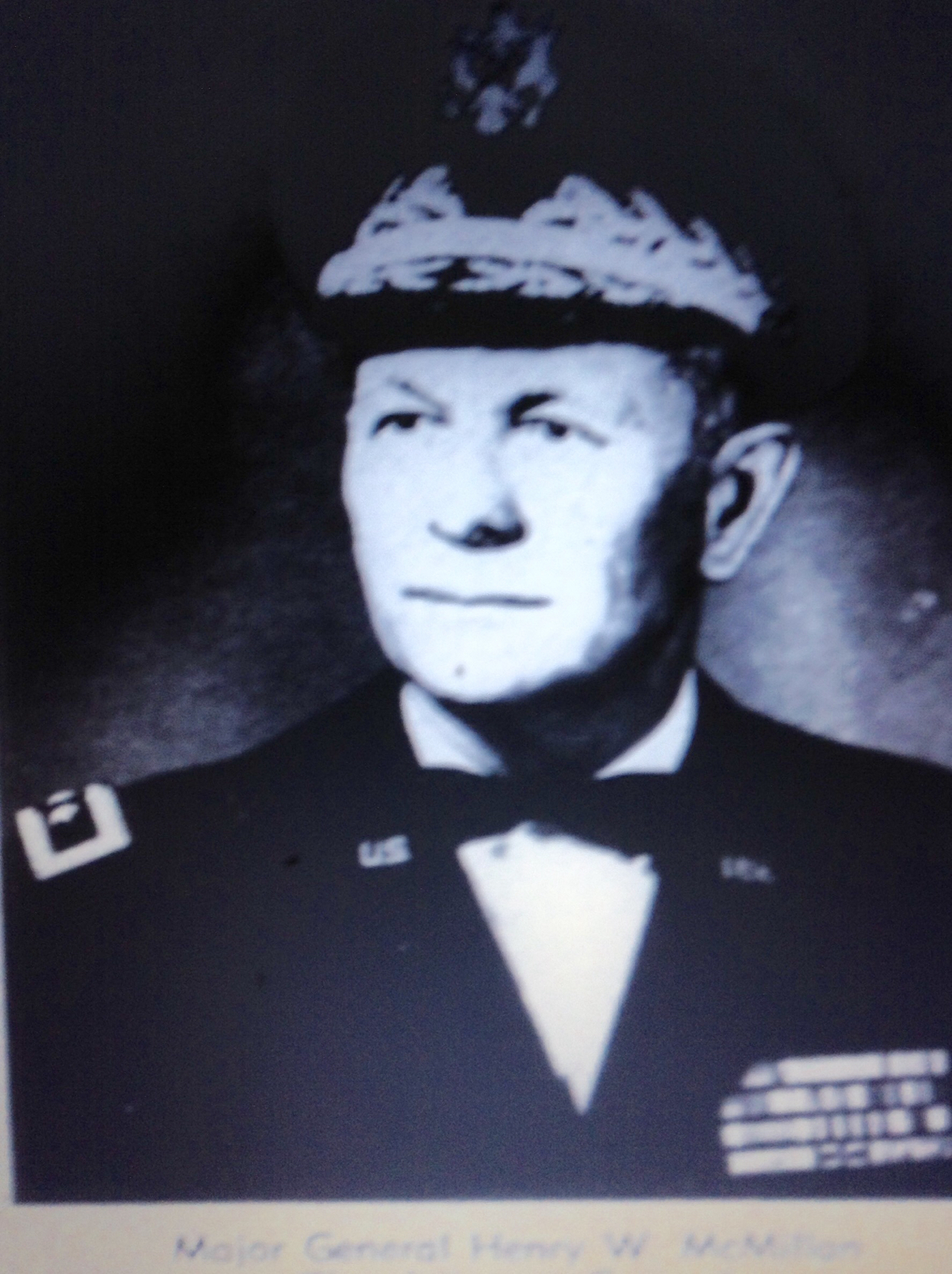
Henry W. McMillan, 28 April 1962 to 12 August 1975

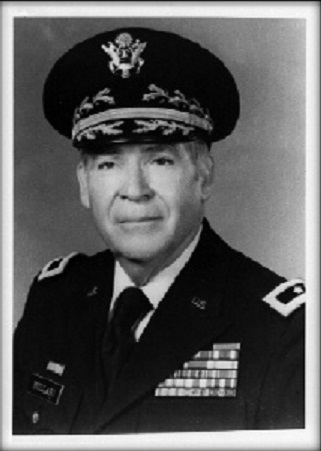
Kennedy C. Bullard, 13 August 1975 to 31 December 1981

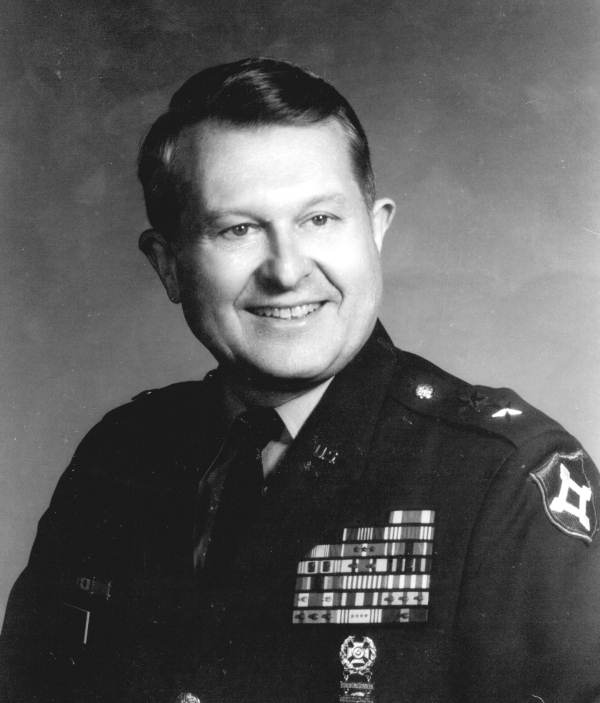
Robert F. Ensslin Jr., 1 January 1982 to 29 February 1992

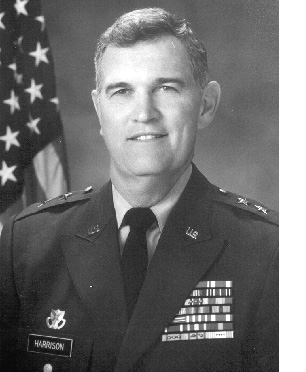
Ronald Harrison, 1 March 1992 to 3 November 2001

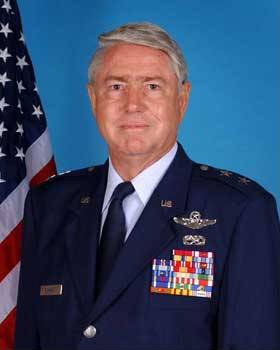
Douglas Burnett, USAF, 3 November 2001 to 26 June 2010

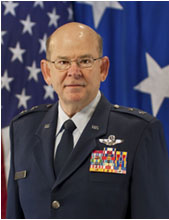
Emmett R. Titshaw Jr., USAF, 26 June 2010 to 29 March 2015

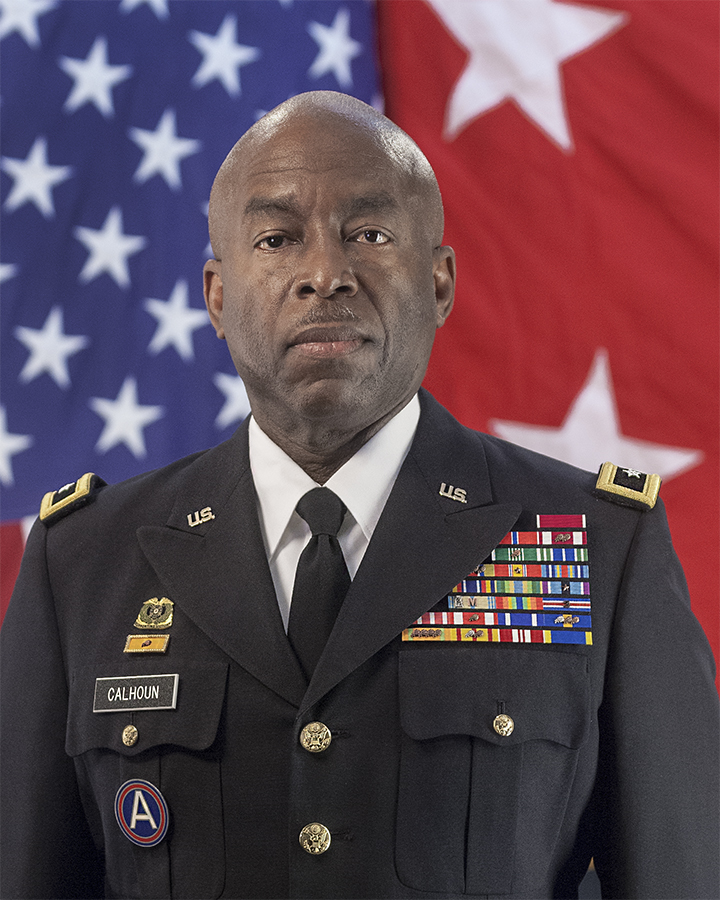
Michael A. Calhoun, 29 March 2015 to 6 April 2019

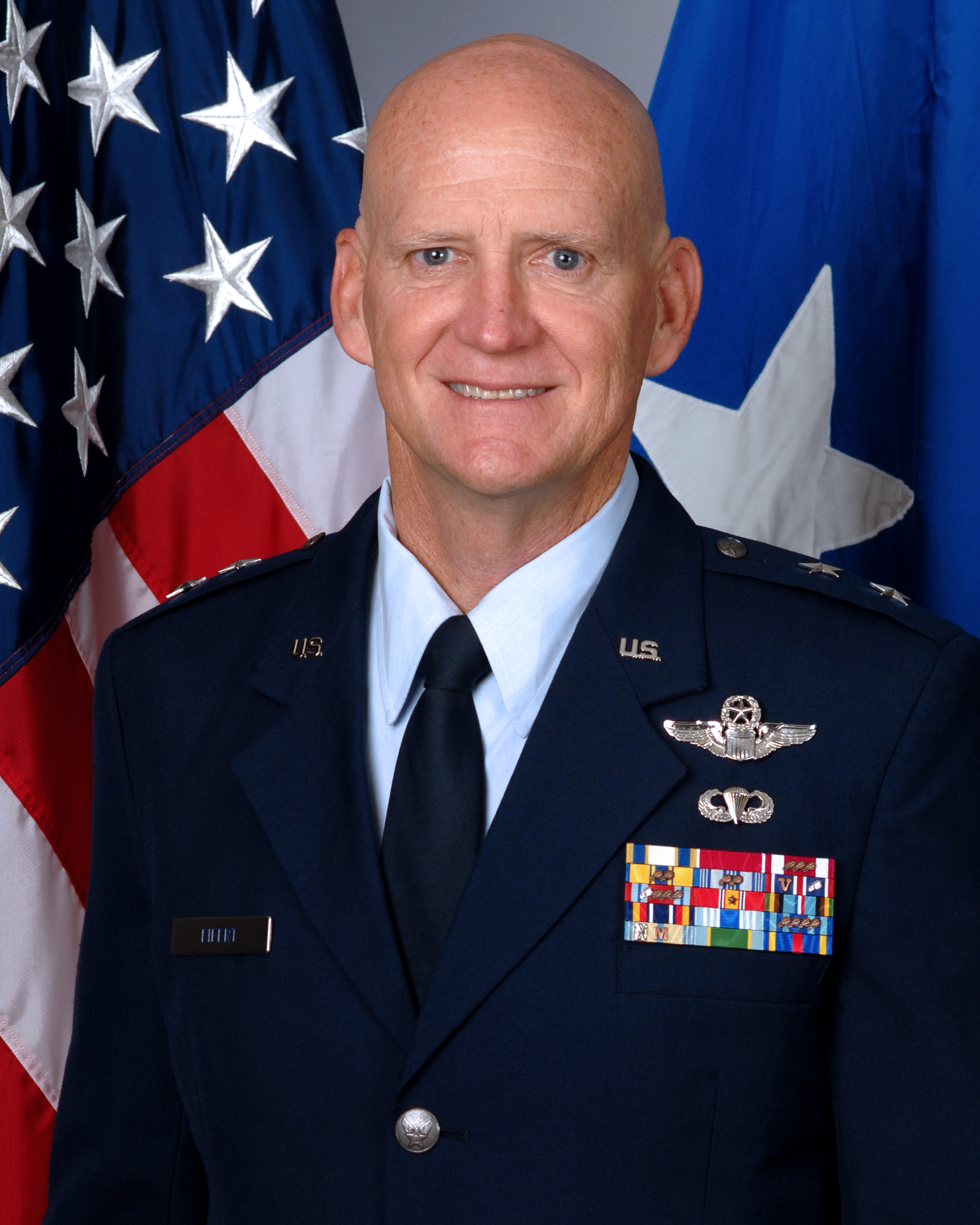
James O. Eifert, 6 April 2019 to 22 April 2023

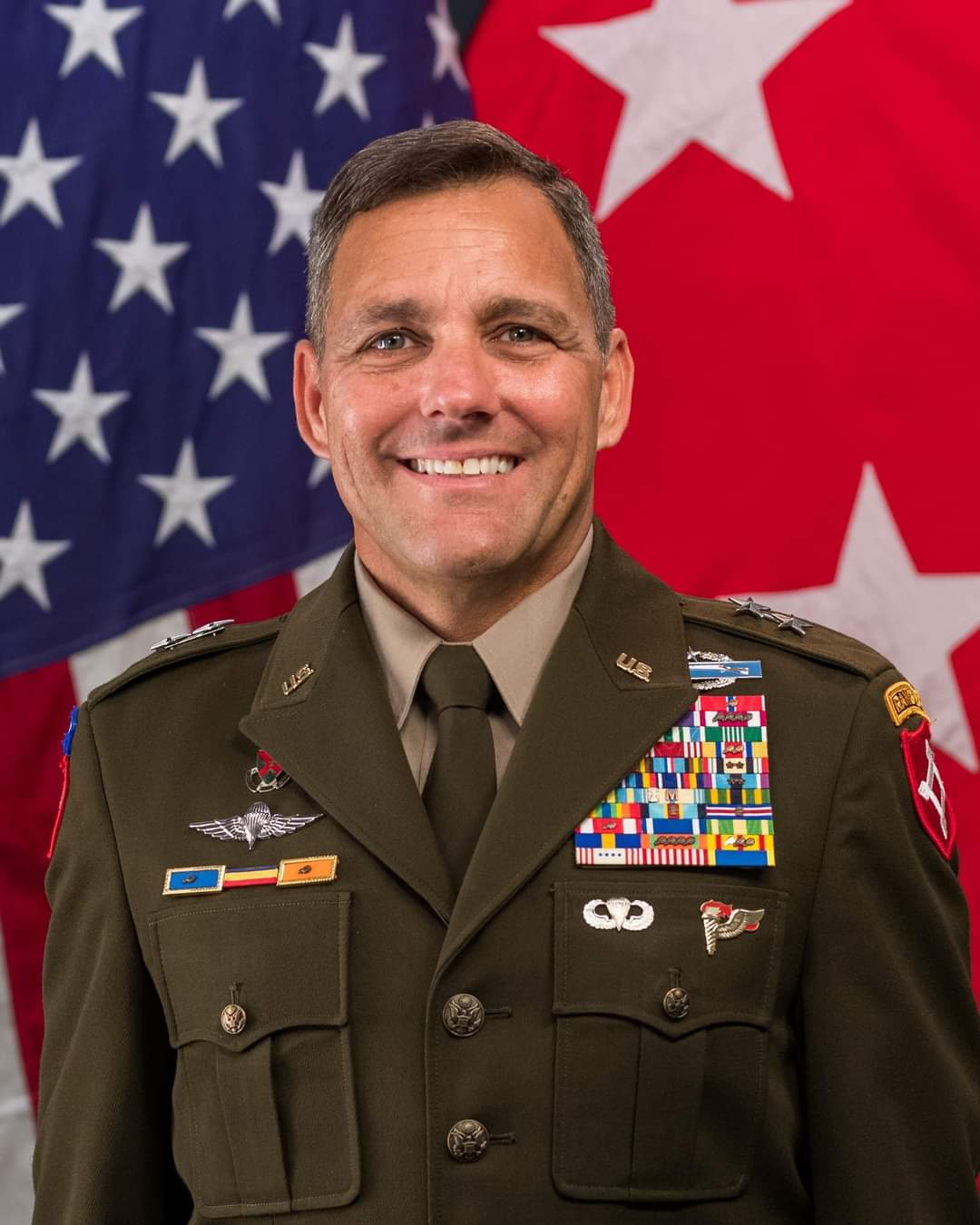
John D. Haas, 22 April 2023 to present

== Army units ==
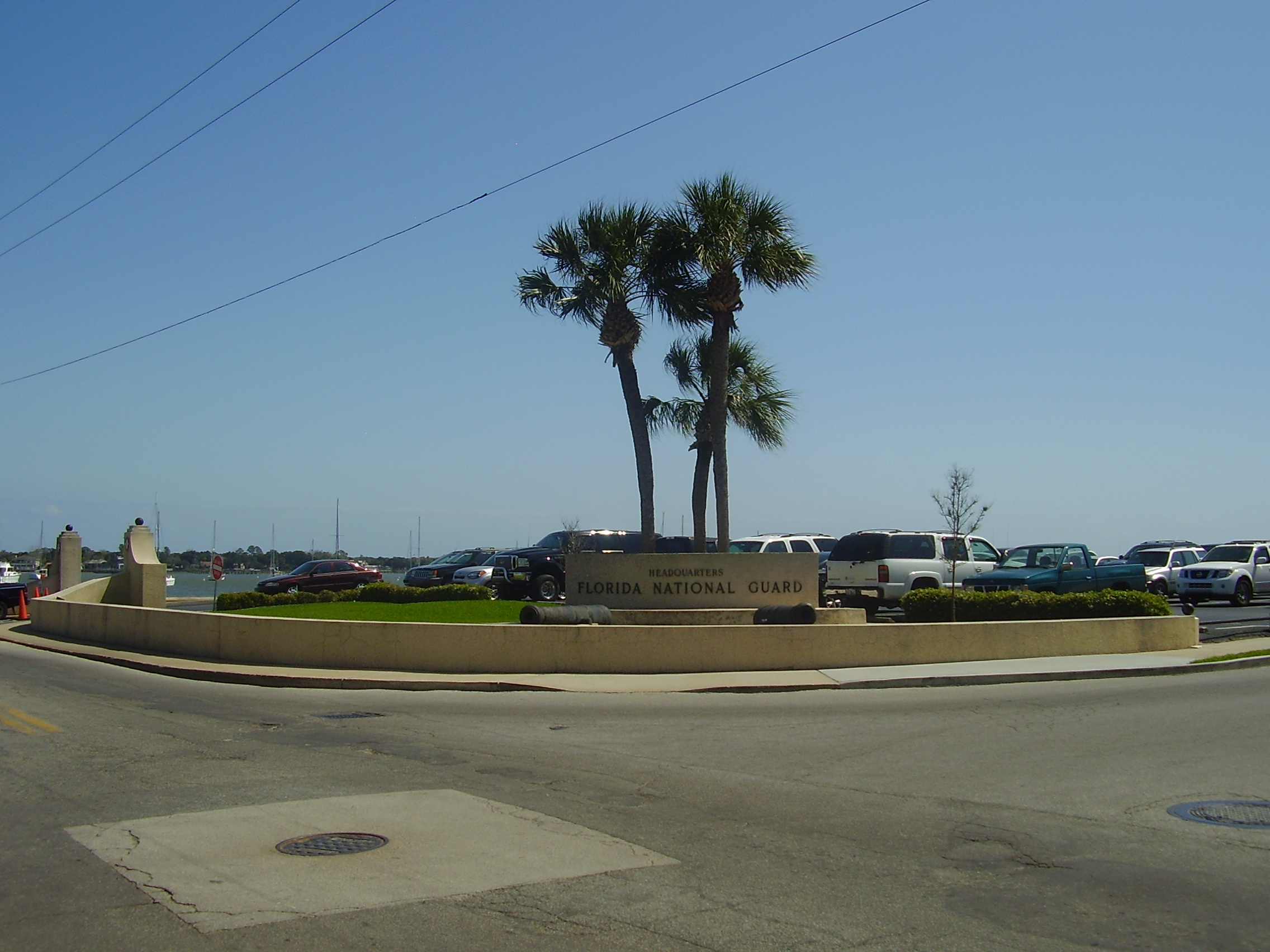
Headquarters of the Florida National Guard

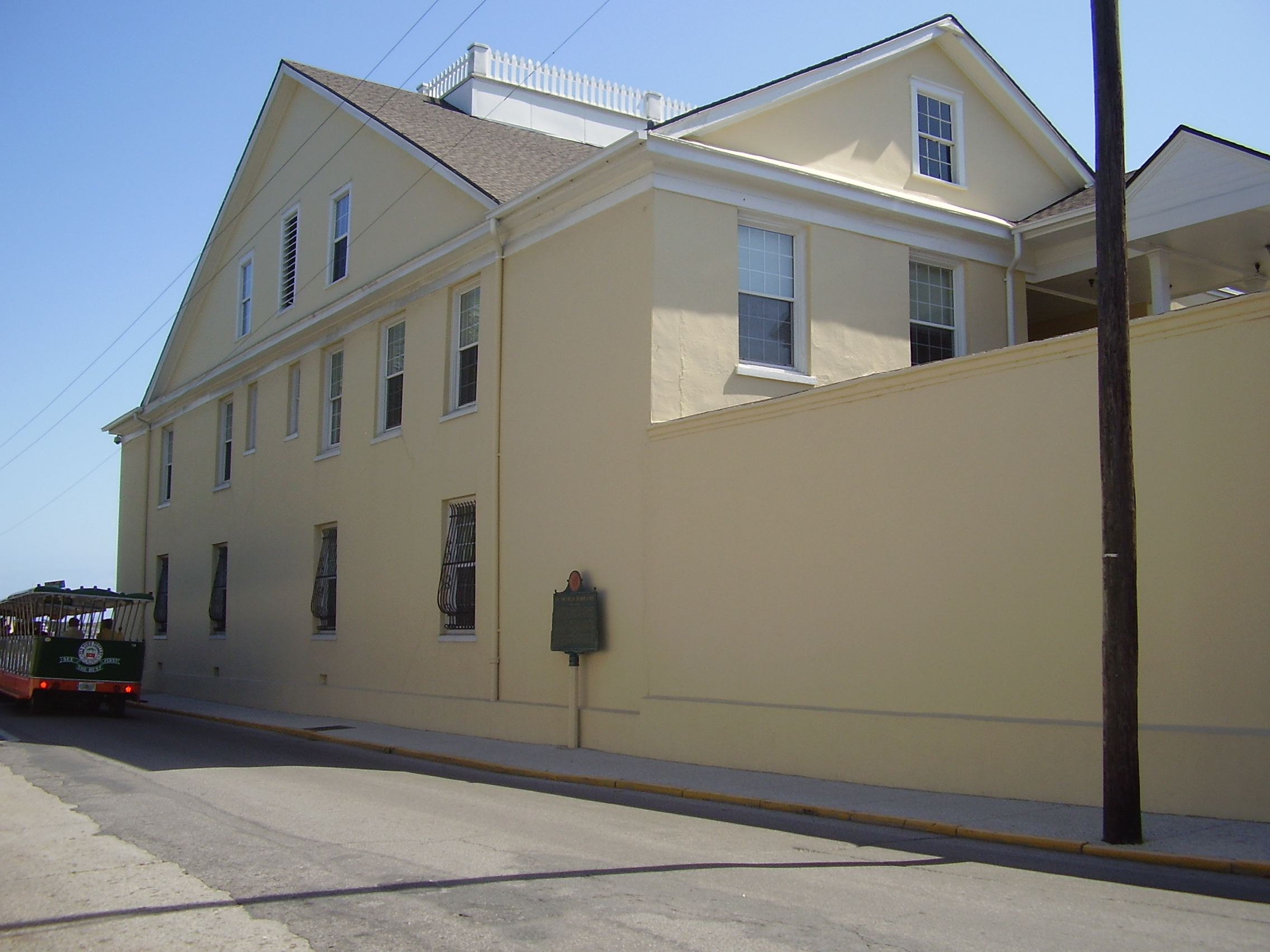
St. Francis Barracks

- Headquarters, Florida Army National Guard - St. Francis Barracks
- 83rd Troop Command (Tallahassee)
  - 3/20th Special Forces Group (Camp Blanding Joint Training Center)
    - HHC, 3/20th SFG
    - Support Company
  - 153rd Finance Battalion (St. Augustine)
    - 1153rd Finance Detachment
    - 2153rd Finance Detachment
    - 3153rd Finance Detachment
  - 111th Aviation Regiment (Jacksonville / Cecil Field)
    - 1-111th Aviation Regiment
    - 2-111th Aviation Regiment (AOB)
  - 171st Aviation Regiment
    - Company B, 1st Battalion (Brooksville / Brooksville-Tampa Bay Regional Airport)
  - 417th Signal Battalion (Composite)
    - HHD
    - 144th Transportation Company (Marianna)
    - 708th General Support Maintenance (Quincy)
    - 653rd Range Extension Company (Crestview)
- 53rd Infantry Brigade Combat Team
  - 1-124th Infantry (South Florida)
  - 2-124th Infantry (Central Florida)
  - 1-153rd Cavalry (RSTA) (Panhandle of Florida)
  - 2-116th Field Artillery
  - 753rd Brigade Engineer Battalion
- 164th Air Defense Artillery Brigade
  - 1-265th ADA (SHORAD)
  - 3-265th ADA (SHORAD)
  - 254th Transportation Battalion
    - HHD 254th
    - 1218th Transportation Company
    - 806th Military Police Company (I/R)
    - 715th Military Police Company (CS)
    - 690th Military Police Company (I/R)
  - 3-116th Field Artillery
    - FSC 3-116th
- 50th Area Support Group
  - 927th Combat Service Support Battalion
- 32nd Army Air & Missile Defense Command - Detachment 1
- 211th Infantry Regiment (Regional Training Institute, that offers the State OCS program)
- 260th Military Intelligence Battalion
- 13th Army Band
- 146th Expeditionary Signal Battalion

== Air Force units ==
- Headquarters, Florida Air National Guard - St. Francis Barracks
- 125th Fighter Wing (125 FW) - Jacksonville Air National Guard Base
  - 159th Fighter Squadron (159 FS)
  - Detachment 1, 125th Fighter Wing - Homestead Air Reserve Base
- 601st Air and Space Operations Center (601 AOC) - Tyndall AFB
- 101st Air and Space Operations Group (101st AOG - Tyndall AFB)
- 325th Fighter Wing Associate Unit (325 FW AU) - Tyndall AFB
- 202d RED HORSE Squadron (202 RHS) - Camp Blanding
- 290th Joint Communications Support Squadron (290 JCSS) -
- MacDill AFB114th Space Control Squadron (114 SPCS) -
- Patrick Space Force Base & Cape Canaveral Space Force Station
- 131st Training Flight (131 TF) - Camp Blanding
- 159th Weather Flight (159 WF - Camp Blanding
- 164th Air Defense Artillery Brigade (164 ADA - Camp Blanding)

== Duties ==
National Guard units can be mobilized at any time by presidential order to supplement regular armed forces, and upon declaration of a state of emergency by the governor of the state in which they serve. Unlike Army Reserve and Air Force Reserve members, National Guard members cannot be mobilized individually (except through voluntary transfers and Temporary Duty Assignments TDA), but only as part of their respective units. However, since 11 September 2001 there have been a significant number of individual activations under Title 10 USC to support military operations (2001–Present); the legality of this policy has been a major issue within the National Guard.

=== Active duty callups ===
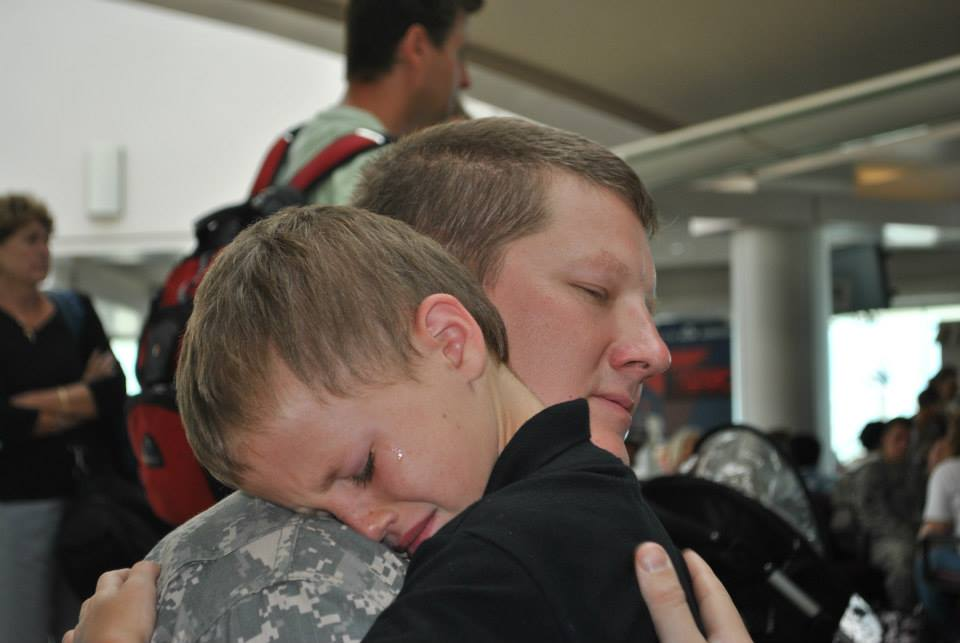
A young boy says goodbye to his dad before the father's deployment

For much of the final decades of the twentieth century, National Guard personnel typically served "One weekend a month, two weeks a year", with a portion working for the Guard in a full-time capacity as either Active Guard and Reserve (AGR), Army Reserve Technicians or Air Reserve Technicians (ART). This changed dramatically during the 1990–91 Gulf War, and continued on to present day, with both the Federal Reserve Components and the National Guard increasingly utilized as an "operational" force for worldwide deployment.

The current forces formation plans of the US Army call for the typical Army National Guard unit (or Army National Guardsman) to serve one year of active duty for every three years of service. The US Air Force applies a similar utilization model for Air National Guard units (and Air National Guardsmen).

More specifically, previous Department of Defense policy was that no National Guardsman would be involuntarily activated for a total of more than 24 months (cumulative) in one six-year period. This policy has changed 1 August 2007, with the new policy stating that National Guard soldiers and airmen will be given 24 months between deployments of no more than 24 months; individual states have differing policies but remain subordinate to DoD policy).

As of 2020, the Florida National Guard was composed of approximately 10,000 soldiers and 1,900 airmen.

== See also ==
- Florida Naval Militia
