= 111th Aviation Regiment (United States) =

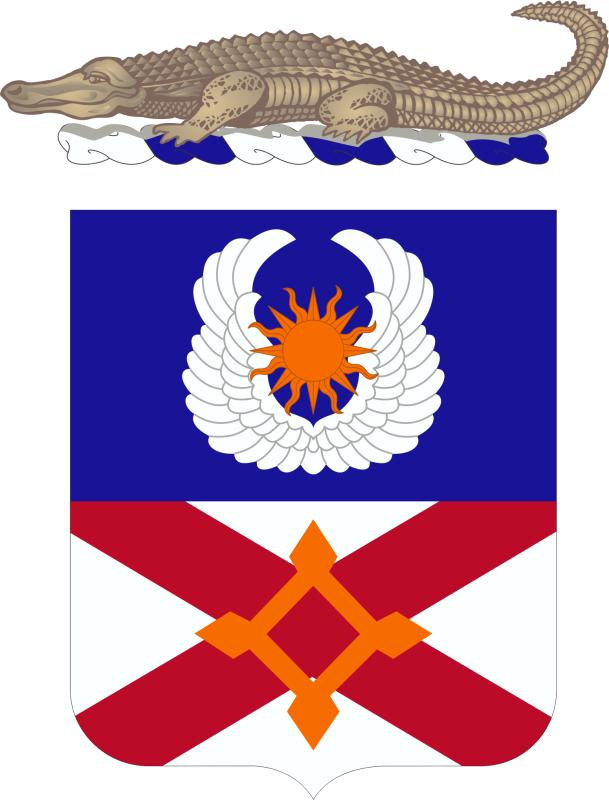
- Coat of arms
- Active: 1987-present (as regiment)
- Country: United States
- Branch: Florida Army National Guard (FL ARNG)
- Role: Aviation
- Size: Regiment
- Part of: 83rd Troop Command
- Garrison/HQ: Cecil Field, Florida
- Motto: Air Warrior Air Attack

Insignia
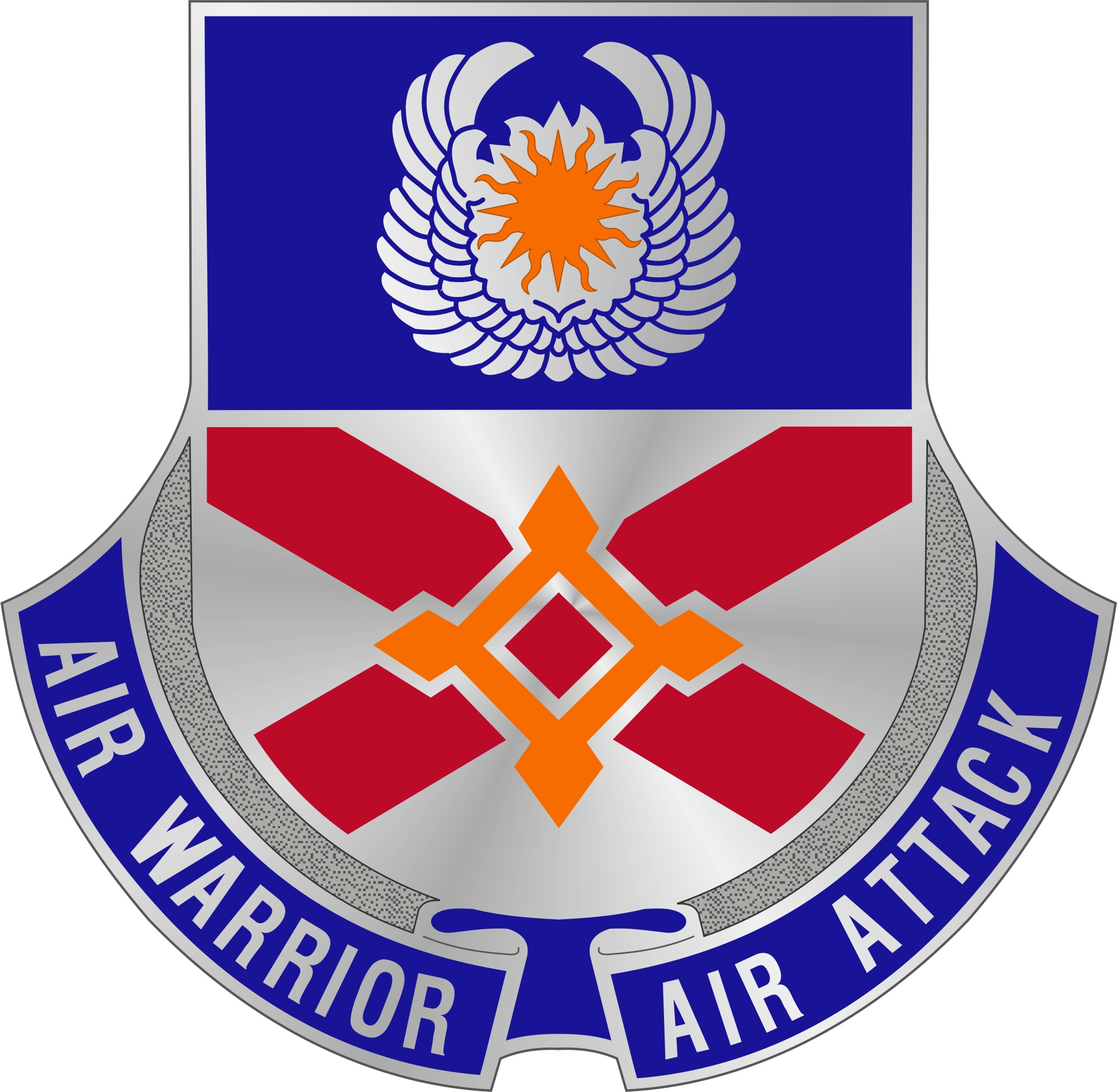
- Distinctive unit insignia

Aircraft flown
- Cargo helicopter: CH-47F Chinook
- Utility helicopter: UH-60M Black Hawk

The 111th Aviation Regiment is a regiment of the Aviation Branch of the United States Army and the Florida National Guard.

The Regiment was organized in the Florida Army National Guard as Company D, 26th Aviation Battalion and federally recognized on 1 September 1978 at Jacksonville. It appears to have begun operations at Craig Municipal Airport and Lakeland Airport. It was expanded, reorganized and redesignated on 2 October 1986 as the 419th Aviation Battalion. A year later, it was reorganized and redesignated on 1 October 1987 as the 111th Aviation, a parent regiment under the United States Army Regimental System to consist of the 1st Battalion at Jacksonville.

The battalion suffered a crash of one of its Apaches on 29 June 1989.

In 2010, Company F 1-111th Aviation was a divisional Air Traffic Services company responsible for managing airspace within the 29th Infantry Division area of responsibility. It was part of the Maryland Army National Guard. Army Air Traffic Controllers operate control towers; ground based radio beacons, and run ground-controlled radar approaches for military aircraft (both fixed-wing and helicopter). The company was structured to operate on a 24-hour basis. It can operate using existing airport/heliport infrastructure or in a suitable field site. Company F was the only air traffic control unit in the Maryland Army National Guard and was one of only 13 units in the entire Army National Guard. Company F, 1-111th AVN consisted of a Terminal Platoon, an Airspace Information Services Platoon, and a Headquarters element.

On Dec. 18, 2011, 29th Combat Aviation Brigade aircraft became the last U.S. rotary-wing aircraft in Iraq, as the 2515th Naval Air Ambulance Detachment and 1-111th General Support Aviation Battalion escorted the last remaining ground troops across the Kuwaiti border.

In 2014, the 2-111th Airfield Operations Battalion deployed to Kuwait and Afghanistan to provide Air Traffic Control services for aviation forces in theatre.

In 2024, the Adjutant-General's report said that the battalion had had (MAKOs) "secured the Florida Straits by providing aerial reconnaissance to ensure the integrity of Florida’s borders. The 1-111th AV BN (GSAB) response effort covered 558 miles of Florida’s border, resulting in over 1,000 flight hours. 1-111th AV BN provided 10 aircraft in support of 53 IBCT Exportable Combat Training Center (xCTC) 24-09 Rotation at Camp Shelby, Mississippi, enabling aerial MEDEVAC, air assault and air movement operations. Additionally, the 2024 hurricane season activated the MAKOs in support of Hurricane Debby, Hurricane Helene, and Hurricane Milton where pre-positions of assets enabled search and rescue operations and immediate aerial damage assessments to state and local authorities. The MAKO Battalion executed over 400 flight hours throughout the 2024 Hurricane Season."

== Structure ==
- 1st Battalion (General Support)
  - Headquarters and Headquarters Company
    - Detachment 1
    - Detachment 2
    - Detachment 3 at Army Aviation Support Facility #2, General Lucius D. Clay National Guard Center (GA ARNG).
  - Company A (UH-60M) at McEntire Joint National Guard Base (SC ARNG).
  - Company B (CH-47F) at G.V. "Sonny" Montgomery National Guard Complex / Key Field Air National Guard Base (MS ARNG).
    - Detachment 1 at Army Aviation Support Facility #1 Cecil Airport, (FL ARNG).
  - Company C (Air Ambulance) (HH-60M), Army Aviation Support Facility #1, Cecil Airport (FL ARNG).
    - Detachment 1 at Army Aviation Support Facility #2, General Lucius D. Clay National Guard Center (GA ARNG).
    - Detachment 2 at Army Aviation Support Facility #1, Fort R. W. Shepherd Armory, (AL ARNG).
  - Company D (CH-47)
    - Detachment 1
    - Detachment 2
    - Detachment 3 at Army Aviation Support Facility #2, General Lucius D. Clay National Guard Center (GA ARNG).
  - Company E
    - Detachment 3 at Army Aviation Support Facility #2, General Lucius D. Clay National Guard Center (GA ARNG).
    - Detachment 8 (IL ARNG)
  - Company F
    - Aberdeen Proving Ground (Edgewood Area) (MD ARNG).
  - Company G
    - Detachment 2
- 2nd Battalion (Airfield Operations), Camp Blanding, (FL ARNG)
  - Company D
    - Detachment 7

== Deployments ==
- Company B (AH-64A) Afghanistan from June 2004 / HQ at Bagram part of Joint Task Force Wings (FL ARNG).
- Company C, Company D (MH-60L) Iraq from January 2011 / HQ at Tallil part of Operation New Dawn (FL, GA, VA ARNG).
