= Craig R. McKinley =

US Air Force general

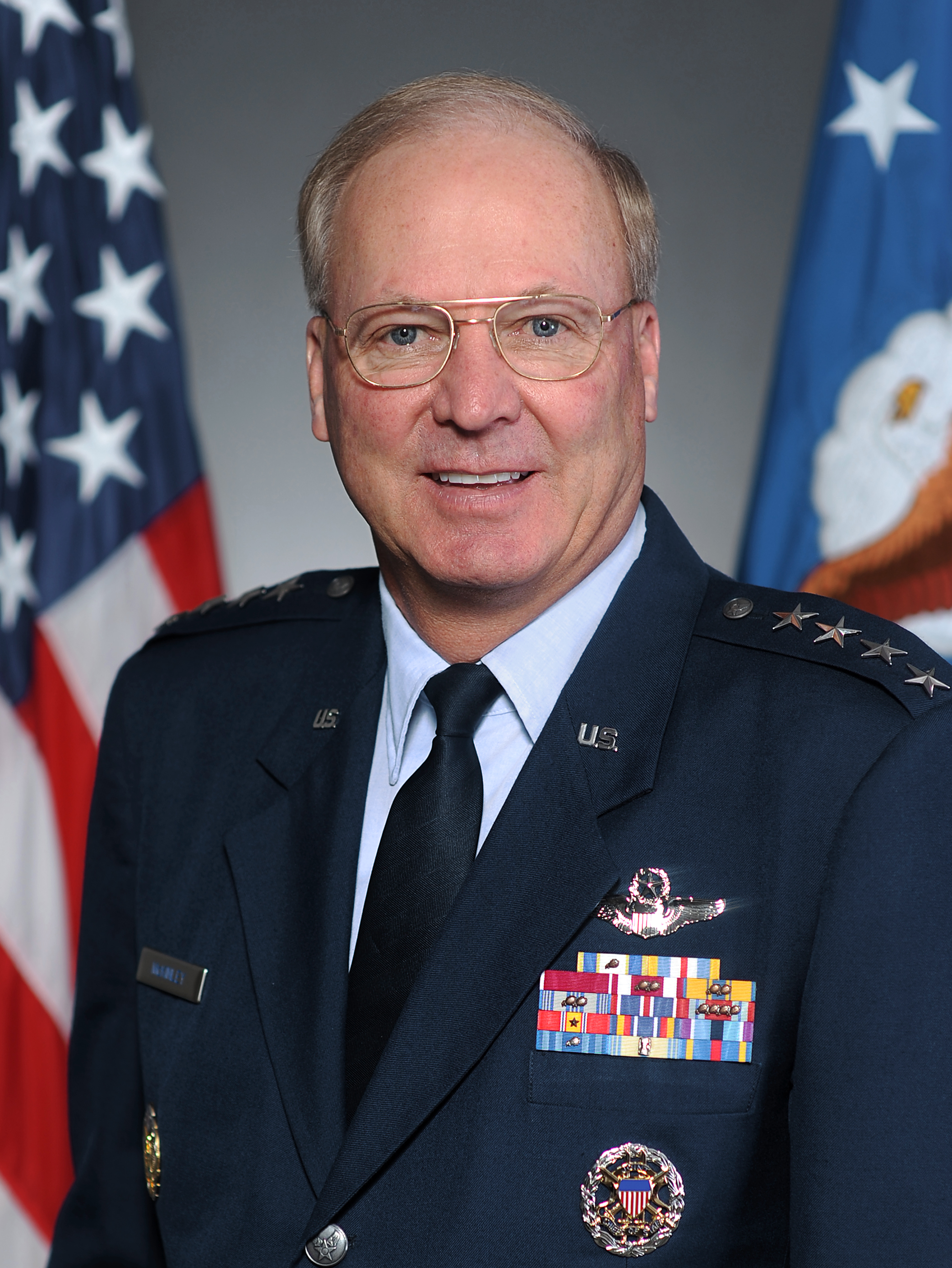
- Official portrait, 2008
- Born: Craig Richard McKinley; May 6, 1952 (age 74); Jacksonville, Florida, U.S.
- Military career
- Service: United States Air Force; Air National Guard
- Service years: 1974–2012
- Rank: General
- Unit: National Guard Bureau
- Commands: Chief of the National Guard Bureau; First Air Force; 125th Fighter Wing
- Wars: Global War on Terrorism
- Awards: Defense Distinguished Service Medal; Homeland Security Distinguished Service Medal; Air Force Distinguished Service Medal (2); Defense Superior Service Medal; Legion of Merit
- Other work: President of the Air Force Association
- Craig R. McKinley's voice McKinley testifies on making the chief of the National Guard Bureau a statutory member of the Joint Chiefs of Staff; Recorded November 10, 2011

Craig Richard McKinley (born May 6, 1952) is a retired United States Air Force general who served as the 26th Chief of the National Guard Bureau, serving from 2008 to 2012. He is the first officer from the National Guard to achieve the grade of a four-star general.

Prior to becoming chief, he served as the Director, Air National Guard from May 2006 to November 17, 2008. He retired after being succeeded by Frank J. Grass on September 7, 2012. At the ceremony where he transferred authority to his successor, McKinley received the Defense Distinguished Service Medal and Homeland Security Distinguished Service Medal. McKinley's official retirement date was November 1, 2012.

== Military career ==
McKinley received his commission in 1974 as a distinguished graduate of the Air Force Reserve Officer Training Corps program at Southern Methodist University. He served in numerous assignments in flying and operations, as well as command positions at group, wing, sector and field operating agency levels. He also served as Commander, First Air Force and Commander, Continental United States North American Aerospace Defense Command Southeast Region, Tyndall Air Force Base, Florida. McKinley is a command pilot with over 4,000 flight hours, primarily in the T-38 Talon, F-106 Delta Dart, F-16 Fighting Falcon and F-15 Eagle. Additionally, McKinley has been pilot in command in the C-131 Samaritan and C-130 Hercules Operational Support Airlift aircraft.

As Chief of the National Guard Bureau, McKinley was the senior uniformed officer of the National Guard of the United States, and the state National Guard, responsible for formulating, developing and coordinating all policies, programs and plans affecting more than half a million federalized and non-federalized Army National Guard and Air National Guard personnel. Appointed by the president, he served as the principal adviser to the Secretary of the Army, Chief of Staff of the Army, the Secretary of the Air Force, and the Chief of Staff of the Air Force. He also served as the principal National Guard adviser to Secretary of Defense through the Chairman of the Joint Chiefs of Staff on all National Guard issues. As National Guard Bureau Chief, he served as the army's and air force's official channel of communication with state governors and Adjutants General concerning state National Guards.

== Education ==
- 1974 Bachelor of Business Administration degree, Southern Methodist University, Dallas, Texas
- 1979 Master of Arts degree in management and economics, Webster College, St. Louis, Missouri.
- 1984 Squadron Officer School, Maxwell AFB, Alabama
- 1990 Air Command and Staff College, Maxwell AFB, Alabama
- 1995 Master of Science degree in national security strategy, National War College, Fort Lesley J. McNair, Washington, D.C.
- 1997 National Security Management Course, Syracuse, N.Y.
- 1998 Capstone, Fort Lesley J. McNair, Washington, D.C.
- 2002 Combined Forces Air Component Commander Course, Maxwell AFB, Alabama
- 2004 U.S. – Russia Security Program, Harvard University, Cambridge, Massachusetts

== Assignments ==
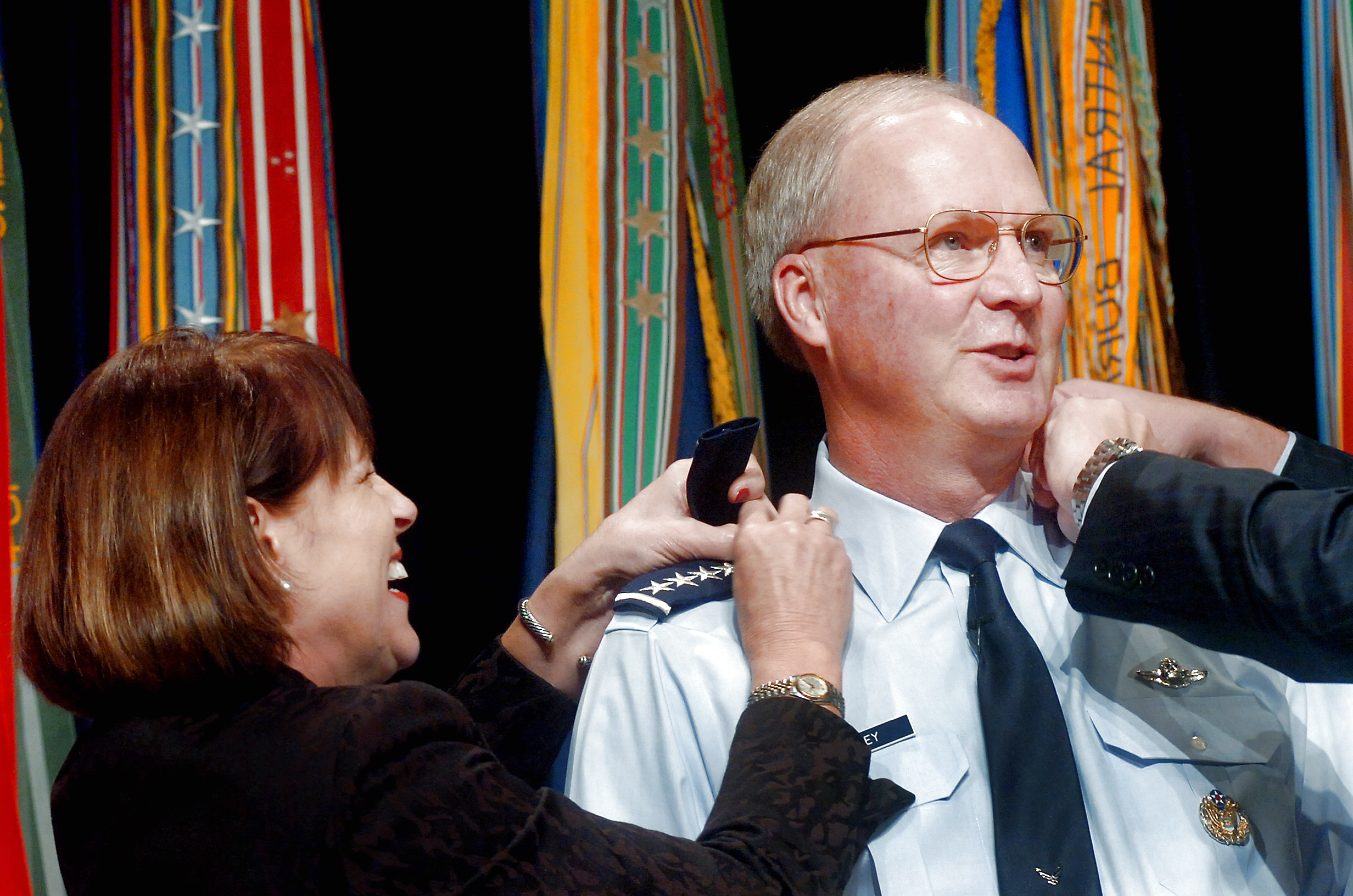
McKinley has his new four-star rank put on his uniform by his wife Cheryl and son Patrick during a ceremony at the Pentagon, where he was also sworn in as the 26th chief of the National Guard Bureau on Monday, Nov. 17, 2008.

1. December 1974 – November 1975, student, undergraduate pilot training, Moody AFB, Georgia
2. November 1975 – March 1977, T-38 instructor pilot, Craig AFB, Alabama
3. March 1977 – May 1979, equal opportunity and treatment officer, Air Force Military Training Center, Lackland AFB, Texas
4. May 1979 – November 1980, T-38 instructor pilot, Laughlin AFB, Texas
5. November 1980 – April 1986, F-106 alert pilot, 125th Fighter Interceptor Group, Jacksonville ANGB, Florida.
6. April 1986 – June 1987, Chief of Safety, 125th Fighter Interceptor Wing, Jacksonville ANGB, Florida
7. June 1987 – April 1989, F-16 instructor pilot, 125th Fighter Wing, Jacksonville ANGB, Florida.
8. April 1989 – May 1990, Chief of Standardization and Evaluation, 125th Fighter Wing, Jacksonville ANGB, Florida
9. May 1990 – May 1991, Deputy Commander for Operations, 125th Fighter Wing, Jacksonville ANGB, Florida
10. May 1991 – May 1994, Commander, 125th Fighter Wing, Jacksonville ANGB, Florida
11. May 1994 – June 1995, student, National War College, Fort Lesley J. McNair, Washington, D.C.
12. June 1995 – March 1996, Commander, 125th Fighter Wing, Jacksonville ANGB, Florida
13. March 1996 – July 1996, Air National Guard Vice Commander, Southeast Air Defense Sector, Tyndall AFB, Florida
14. July 1996 – January 1998, Commander, Southeast Air Defense Sector, Tyndall AFB, Florida
15. January 1998 – February 2001, Deputy Director, Air National Guard, Arlington, Virginia, and Commander, Air National Guard Readiness Center, Andrews AFB, Maryland
16. March 2001 – July 2002, Deputy Inspector General of the Air Force, Office of the Secretary of the Air Force, Washington, D.C.
17. August 2002 – October 2004, Commander, 1st Air Force (1 AF) of Air Combat Command, and Commander, Continental U.S. North American Aerospace Defense Command Region, Tyndall AFB, Florida.
18. November 2004 – November 2005, Director, Mobilization and Reserve Affairs Directorate, U.S. European Command, Stuttgart-Vaihingen, Germany
19. November 2005 – May 2006, Assistant Deputy Chief of Staff for Plans and Programs, Headquarters U.S. Air Force, Washington, D.C.
20. May 2006 – November 2008, Director, Air National Guard, Arlington, Virginia
21. November 2008 – September 2012, Chief, National Guard Bureau, Arlington, Virginia

== Flight information ==
- Rating: Command Pilot
- Flight hours: More than 4,000
- Aircraft flown: C-130, C-131, F-15, F-16, F-106, T-33, T-37 and T-38
- Pilot wings from Moody Air Force Base, Georgia

== Awards and decorations ==
| US Air Force Command Pilot Badge |
| Joint Chiefs of Staff Badge |
| Headquarters Air Force Badge |

Personal decorations
| | Defense Distinguished Service Medal |
| | Homeland Security Distinguished Service Medal |
| | Air Force Distinguished Service Medal with bronze oak leaf cluster |
| | Defense Superior Service Medal |
| Width-44 crimson ribbon with a pair of width-2 white stripes on the edges | Legion of Merit |
| Width-44 crimson ribbon with two width-8 white stripes at distance 4 from the edges. | Meritorious Service Medal with two bronze oak leaf clusters |
| | Air Force Commendation Medal with two bronze oak leaf clusters |
| | Air Force Achievement Medal with two bronze oak leaf clusters |
Unit awards
| | Air Force Outstanding Unit Award |
Service awards
| | Combat Readiness Medal with four bronze oak leaf clusters |
Campaign and service medals
| Width=44 scarlet ribbon with a central width-4 golden yellow stripe, flanked by pairs of width-1 scarlet, white, Old Glory blue, and white stripes | National Defense Service Medal with bronze service star |
| | Global War on Terrorism Service Medal |
| | Humanitarian Service Medal |
Service, training, and marksmanship awards
| | Air Force Longevity Service Award with silver and three bronze oak leaf clusters |
| | Armed Forces Reserve Medal with silver Hourglass device |
| | Air Force Training Ribbon |

=== Other achievements ===
- 1974 Distinguished graduate, Air Force ROTC, Southern Methodist University
- 1993 I.G. Brown Trophy
- 2003 Distinguished Alumni Award, Southern Methodist University
- 2004 Combined Forces Commander, Unified Engagement 04, U.S. Joint Forces Command

== Effective dates of promotion ==
Promotions
| Insignia | Rank | Date |
|---|---|---|
| | General (USAF) | November 17, 2008 |
| | Lieutenant General (USAF) | May 20, 2006 |
| | Major General (USAF) | May 24, 2001 |
| | Brigadier General (USAF) | January 28, 1998 |
| | Colonel (ANG) | January 28, 1994 |
| | Lieutenant Colonel (ANG) | May 16, 1990 |
| | Major (ANG) | May 16, 1986 |
| | Captain (ANG) | November 21, 1980 |
| | First Lieutenant (USAF) | December 8, 1976 |
| | Second Lieutenant (USAF) | May 18, 1974 |

Military offices
| Preceded by Daniel James | Director of the Air National Guard; 2006–2008 | Succeeded by Emmett R. Titshaw Jr. Acting |
| Preceded by H Steven Blum | Chief of the National Guard Bureau; 2008–2012 | Succeeded by Frank J. Grass |
