= Michael A. Calhoun =

American general

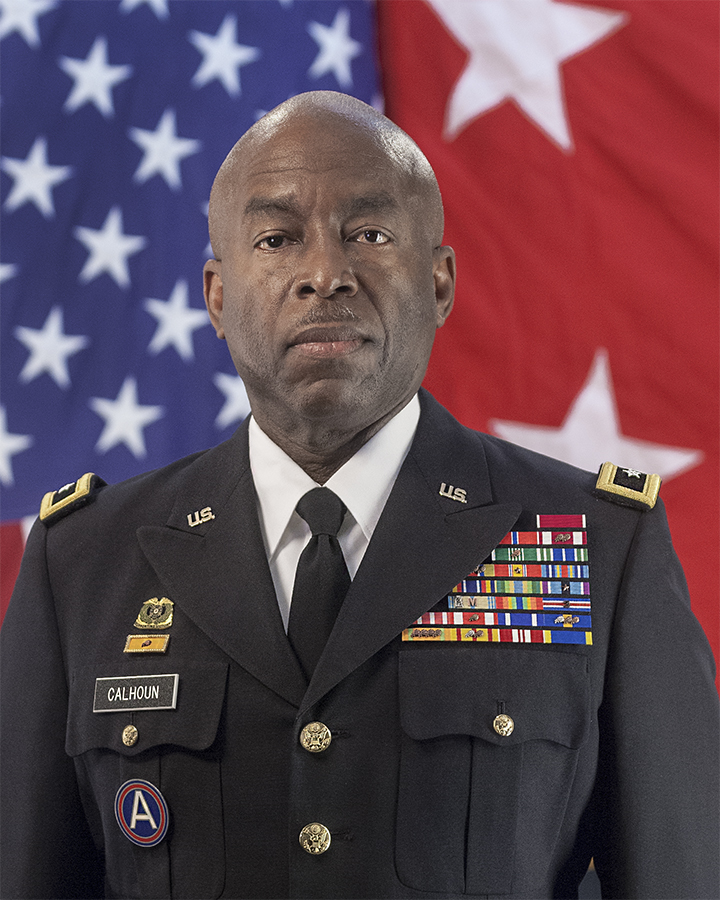
- Calhoun in 2007
- Born: 1954 (age 71–72)
- Military career
- Allegiance: United States
- Branch: United States Army
- Service years: 1977–2019
- Rank: Major General
- Commands: Adjutant General, State of Florida; Florida National Guard; 83rd Troop Command; 50th ASG
- Awards: Legion of Merit; Bronze Star; Humanitarian Service Medal; Florida Cross

Michael A. Calhoun (born 1954) is a retired Army National Guard major general who served as the Adjutant General of Florida. General Calhoun was appointed by Governor of Florida Rick Scott on March 29, 2015.

As Adjutant General, General Calhoun was the highest-ranking member of the Florida National Guard. He was responsible for managing the affairs of the Florida Military Department and for advising the Governor, who is the Commander-in-Chief of the Guard. Additionally, Governor Scott appointed General Calhoun to serve as the Secretary of the Military in the Governor's Cabinet.

== Military career ==
Following graduation from Florida A&M University, General Calhoun enlisted as a private in the Florida Army National Guard in August 1977. After a six-year break in service, he received a direct commission and appointment to 1st Lieutenant in the Medical Service Corps on July 22, 1989. His follow-on assignments include Chief of Pharmacy Services, 131st Mobile Army Surgical Hospital (MASH); Executive Officer, 131st MASH; Logistics Officer, 50th Area Support Group (ASG); Director, Host Nations Support, 50th ASG and Director, Support Operations, 50th ASG. General Calhoun deployed with the 50th ASG in 2003 as Director of Host Nations Support during Operation Iraqi Freedom and served as Deputy Commander, Task Force (FL) in Mississippi during Hurricane Katrina.

General Calhoun's commands include: Company A, 161st Area Support Medical Battalion; the 856th Quartermaster Battalion (Water); the 53rd Infantry Brigade Special Troops Battalion; the 211th Regiment, Regional Training Institute (RTI-FL); the 50th ASG and the 83rd Troop Command.

General Calhoun is a graduate of the Combat Casualty Care Course; the Army Medical Department (AMEDD) Officer Basic and Advance Courses; AMEDD Pharmacy Specialty Orientation Course; the Support Operations Course; Command and General Staff Services School; Command and General Staff College; Quartermaster Officer Basic and Advance Courses; CSS Pre-Command Course; Air Defense Artillery Officer Course; Joint Task Force Commanders Course; the Dual Status Commander Program; the Army Strategic Leaders Development Program-B; Chairman of the Joint Chiefs of Staff Level IV Antiterrorism Executive Training; the DSCA Executive Seminar; and the Harvard University John F. Kennedy School of Government General and Flag Officer Homeland Security Executive Seminar.

In addition to a Bachelor of Science Degree in Pharmacy from Florida A&M University, General Calhoun holds a master's degree in Strategic Studies from the U.S. Army War College.

In the years since his enlistment in the Army as a private in 1977, his duties have ranged from providing first aid to Cubans arriving in Florida during the 1980 Mariel boatlift, to spending a year deployed with a combat support unit in Kuwait after the American invasion of Iraq.

General Calhoun is a recipient of the Legion of Merit, Bronze Star Medal, the Humanitarian Service Medal, the Florida Cross, the Florida Distinguished Service Medal, the Alabama Commendation Medal, and the Mississippi State Emergency Medal. He was the Army National Guard recipient of the Department of Defense African American History Month Recognition Award for 2008, for his contributions to the Global War on Terrorism, and a recipient of the Ancient Order of Saint Barbara.

== Scott administration ==
On March 29, 2015, Governor of Florida Rick Scott appointed General Calhoun to become the Adjutant General of Florida. In that position, MG Calhoun was responsible for the operations and has command over all aspects of the Florida Army and Air National Guard. In April 2019, Governor Ron DeSantis named Florida Air National Guard MG James O. Eifert to replace the retiring MG Calhoun.

== Personal life ==
MG Calhoun received a Bachelor of Science in pharmacy from the Florida A&M University. He also received a master's degree in Strategic Studies from the United States Army War College.
