= 83rd Troop Command =

83d Troop Command
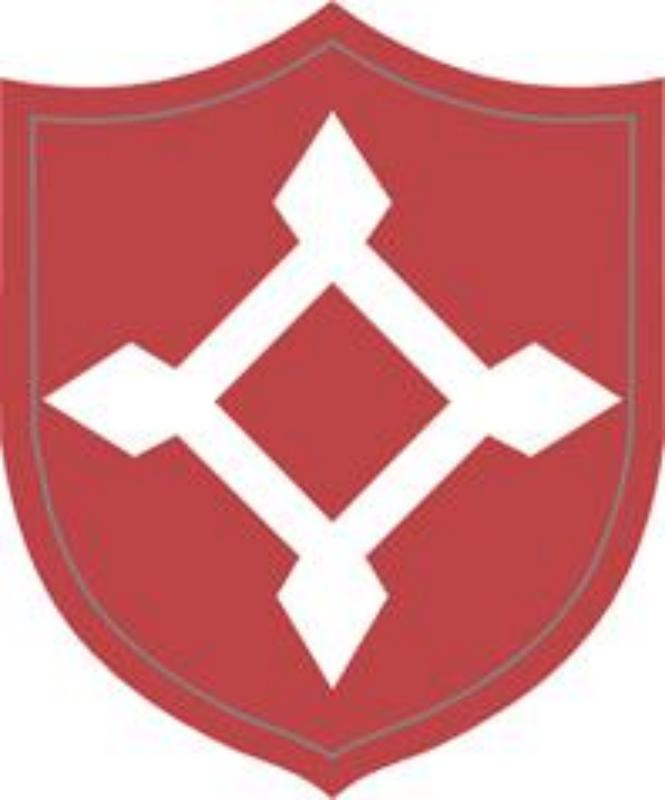
- 83d Troop Command insignia
- Active: October 1, 1978–present
- Country: United States
- Branch: United States Army National Guard
- Type: Headquarters
- Part of: Florida Army National Guard
- Garrison/HQ: Tallahassee, Florida

Commanders
- Current commander: Colonel Vaughn Brown
- Notable commanders: Brigadier General Trey Chauncey

Insignia
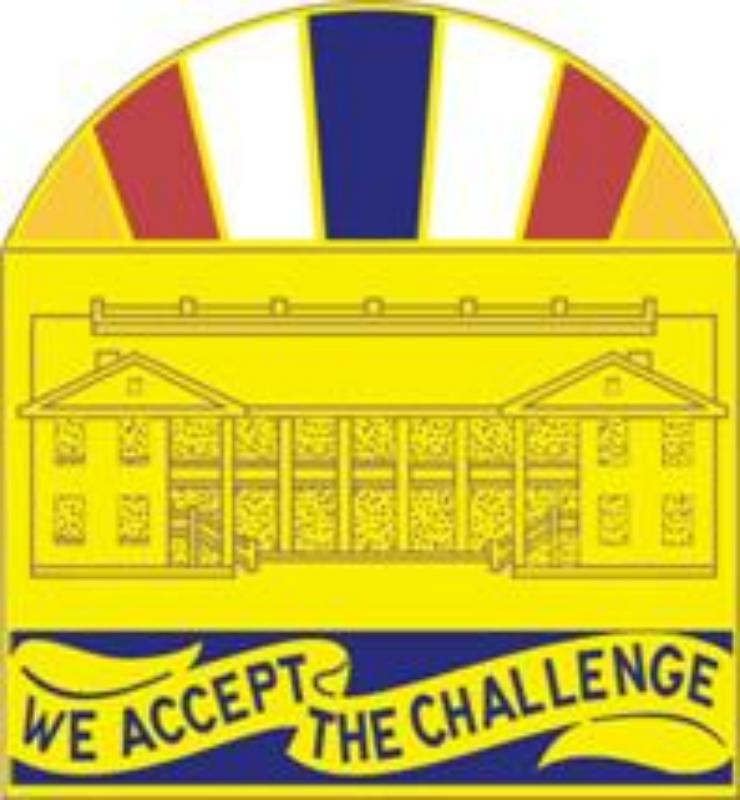
- Distinctive Unit Insignia

The Florida Army National Guard's 83rd Troop Command provides command and control over designated units within Florida during peacetime. The command ensures that all units under its responsibility are trained, equipped and prepared to deploy in support of federal and state missions. The 83rd Troop Command, based in Tallahassee, Florida., includes a variety of specialized units throughout the state.

== Recent missions ==
Since the September 11 attacks, the Special Forces Soldiers from the Florida National Guard’s 3rd Battalion, 20th Special Forces Group have been mobilized in support of several operations. Unit members were activated in late December 2001 and have deployed to several locations including Afghanistan, Iraq, South America, Africa, Germany and Fort Bragg, North Carolina. Additionally in 2002, a small cell of Special Forces Soldiers were deployed under a Presidential Selective Reserve Call-Up to support the Stabilization Force(SFOR) rotation in Bosnia at the end of the summer.

Also in 2002, the 417th Signal Battalion, based in Tallahassee and the 653rd Signal Company, based in Crestview, Florida participated in Operation Restore Calm during their Annual Training period by installing, operating and maintaining echelons above core and other signal assets to provide restoration of C41 networks for the Florida and South Carolina Military Departments and their subordinate organizations.

In 2003, elements of the 153rd Finance Battalion, based in St. Augustine, Florida were mobilized to Guantanamo Bay, Cuba, in support of Operation Enduring Freedom. Task Force 153 Finance was responsible for budgeting and accounting of all funds to support two task forces assigned to Guantanamo Military Operations.

Also in 2003, more than 340 Soldiers of the Jacksonville-based 146th Signal Battalion were activated for Title 10 duty and performed external security missions at six of Florida's Air Force bases stretching from Pensacola to Homestead. In 2004, the 144th Transportation Company deployed to Fort Stewart to support operations there.

In 2004, the 653rd Signal Company deployed to Iraq to provide long-range communications support throughout the area of operations. That same year Company C of the Aviation Battalion, along with slice elements from the Aviation Intermediate Maintenance Battalion, deployed to Bosnia as part of the Stabilization Force. Company B of the 1st Battalion, 171st Aviation Regiment, the Aviation Unit Maintenance Company and Detachment 1, Company C, 171st Aviation, C-23 Sherpa all deployed to Iraq in support of Operation Iraqi Freedom. The 153rd Finance Battalion also deployed to Iraq to provide financial operations to Troops.

In 2005, the 146th Signal Battalion completed a its two-year mission augmenting security forces at eight U.S. Air Force installations throughout the State of Florida and Puerto Rico. The 144th Transportation Company was deployed to Iraq. The 2153rd Finance Detachment mobilized in Sept. 2005 to deploy in support of Operation Iraqi Freedom.

In 2006, the 146th Signal Battalion, 417th Signal Battalion and the 3rd Battalion, 20th Special Forces Group conducted humanitarian and security support operations for Hurricane Dennis, Hurricane Katrina and Hurricane Wilma.

In April 2008, the Special Operations Detachment-Central deployed to the United Arab Emirates in support of Eastern Eagle 08, Special Operations Command-Central's Regional Special Operations Exercise. This was the first time 19 Arab countries gathered together in one forum to test the concept of standing up a Regional Coordination Center (RCC). The RCC performed flawlessly during the exercise and stands as the benchmark for partner nation intra-agency cooperation for targeting transnational terrorist groups throughout the region.

In 2008, the 779th Engineer Battalion successfully converted from a Signal and Maintenance structure to a full spectrum Engineer Battalion. After one year of conversion and the receipt of an alert order for the Headquarters and Headquarters Company and Forward Support Company, the battalion planned and executed a battalion-wide Annual Training period at Camp Blanding. The Annual Training period “Operation Wolverine” concentrated on Tactical Operations Center operations, the Military Decision Making Process, site defense and Army Warrior Training in preparation for mobilization.

The Headquarters and Headquarters Company and the Forward Support Company of the 779th Engineer Battalion deployed to Mosul, Iraq, August 1, 2010. Upon deployment, the 779th Engineer Battalion was task organized under the command of the 130th Engineer Brigade (active duty), headquartered at Schofield Barracks, Hawaii. The 779th also assumed command of the 115th Engineer Company (Vertical) from the West Virginia Army National Guard, the 1313th Engineer Company (Horizontal) from the Indiana Army National Guard, the 70th Geospatial Team, the 591st Engineer Company (Sapper) and 111th Engineer Company (Sapper).

The 2d Battalion (Airfield Operations), 111th Aviation Regiment deployed in support of Operation Iraqi Freedom in late May 2009 and arrived in theater less than 15 days later. That feat delivered more than 11½ months of boots on ground time for the Army, and nearly matched the deployment length of active duty component units. During this deployment, the Overseers were the proving ground for many new operational techniques that have produced an efficient and creative utilization of existing air traffic control (ATC) systems.

== Units ==
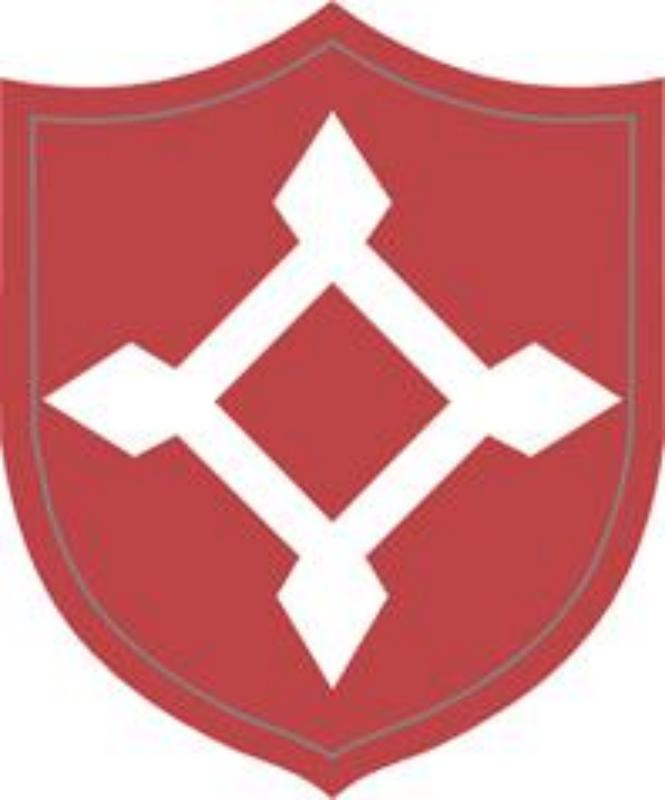
- 83rd Troop Command
  - Headquarters, 83rd Troop Command
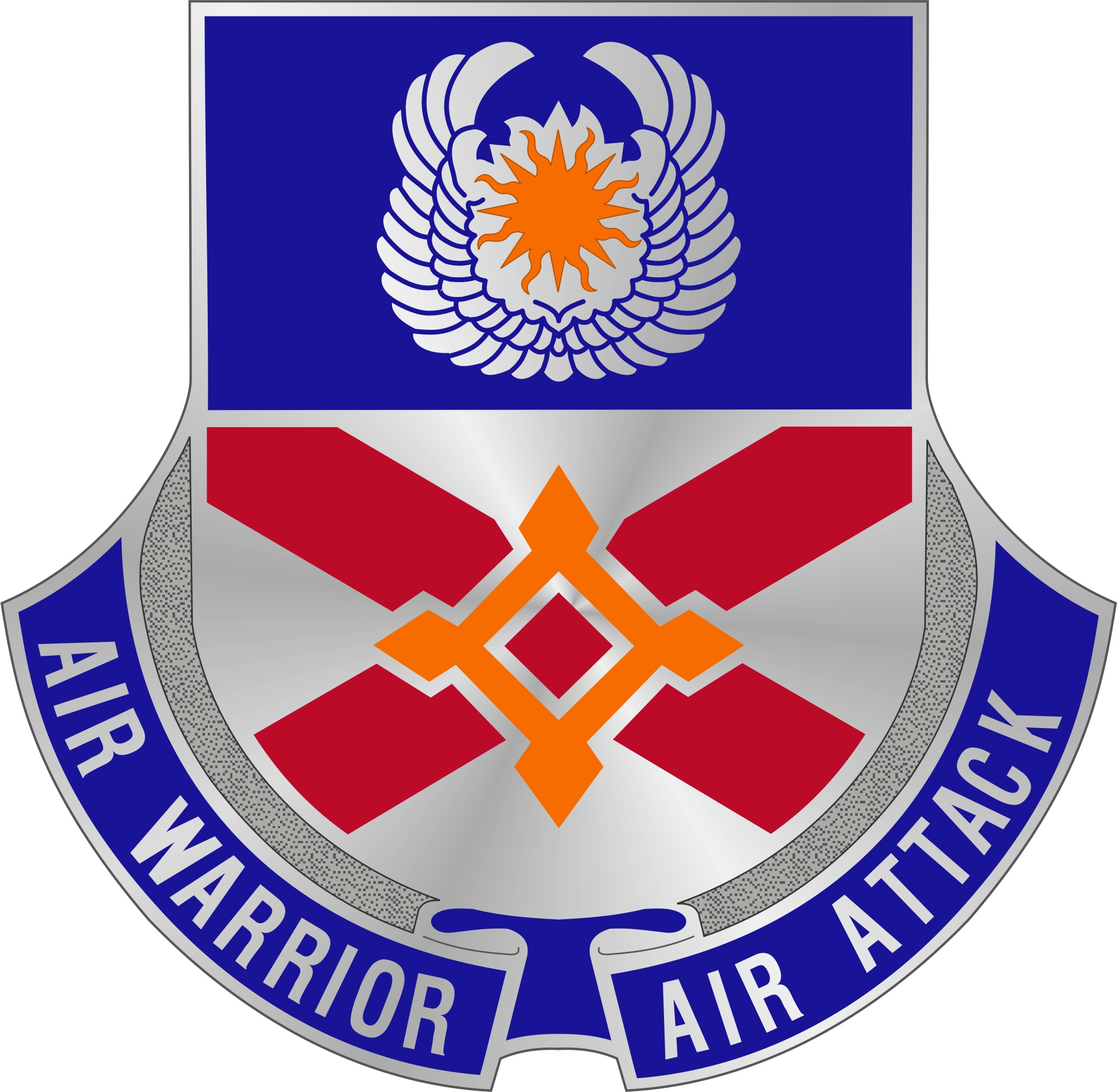
  - 1st Battalion, 111th Aviation Regiment
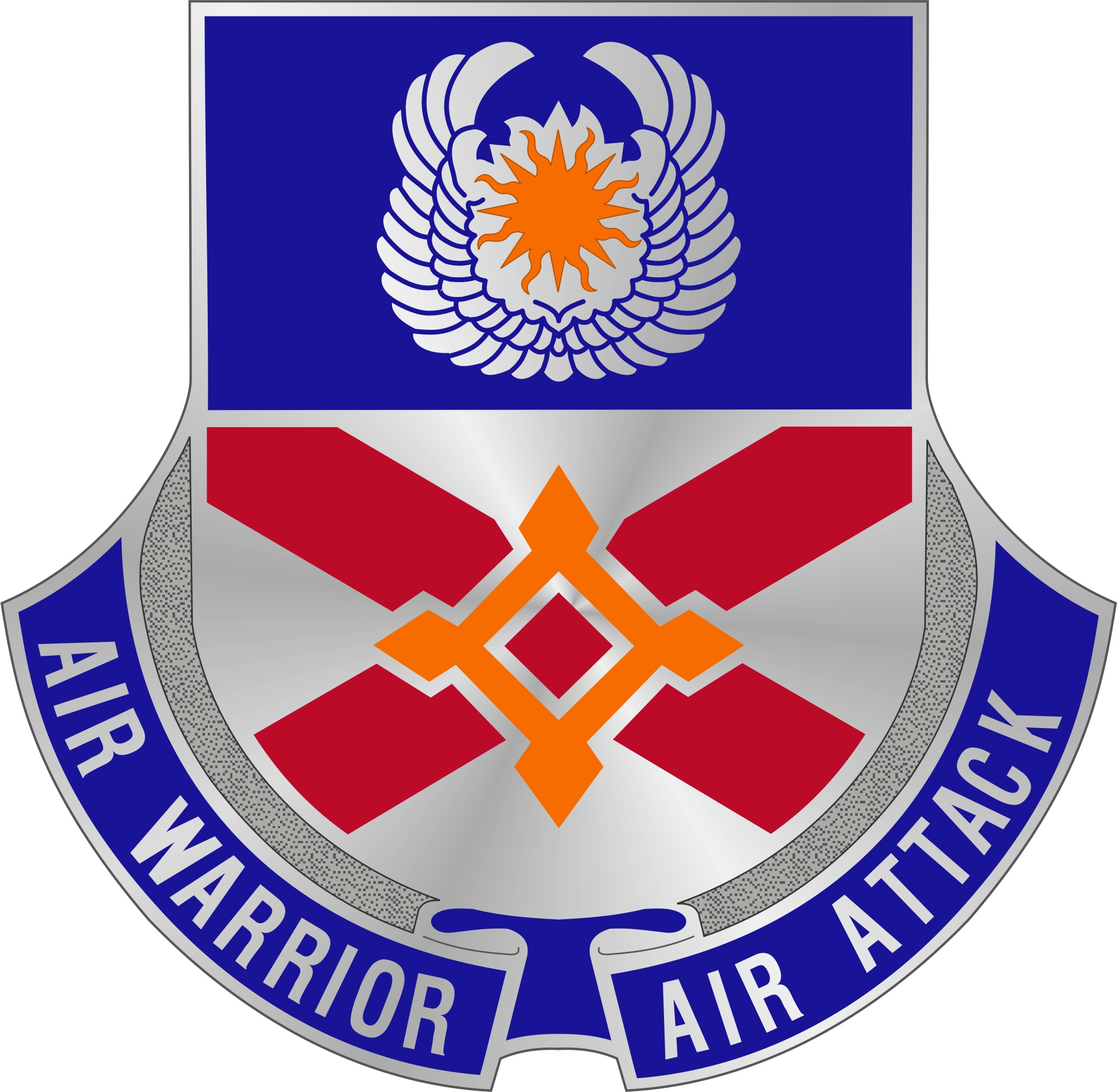
  - 2nd Battalion, 111th Aviation Regiment
  - Special Operations Detachment - Central Command
  - 3rd Battalion, 20th Special Forces Group
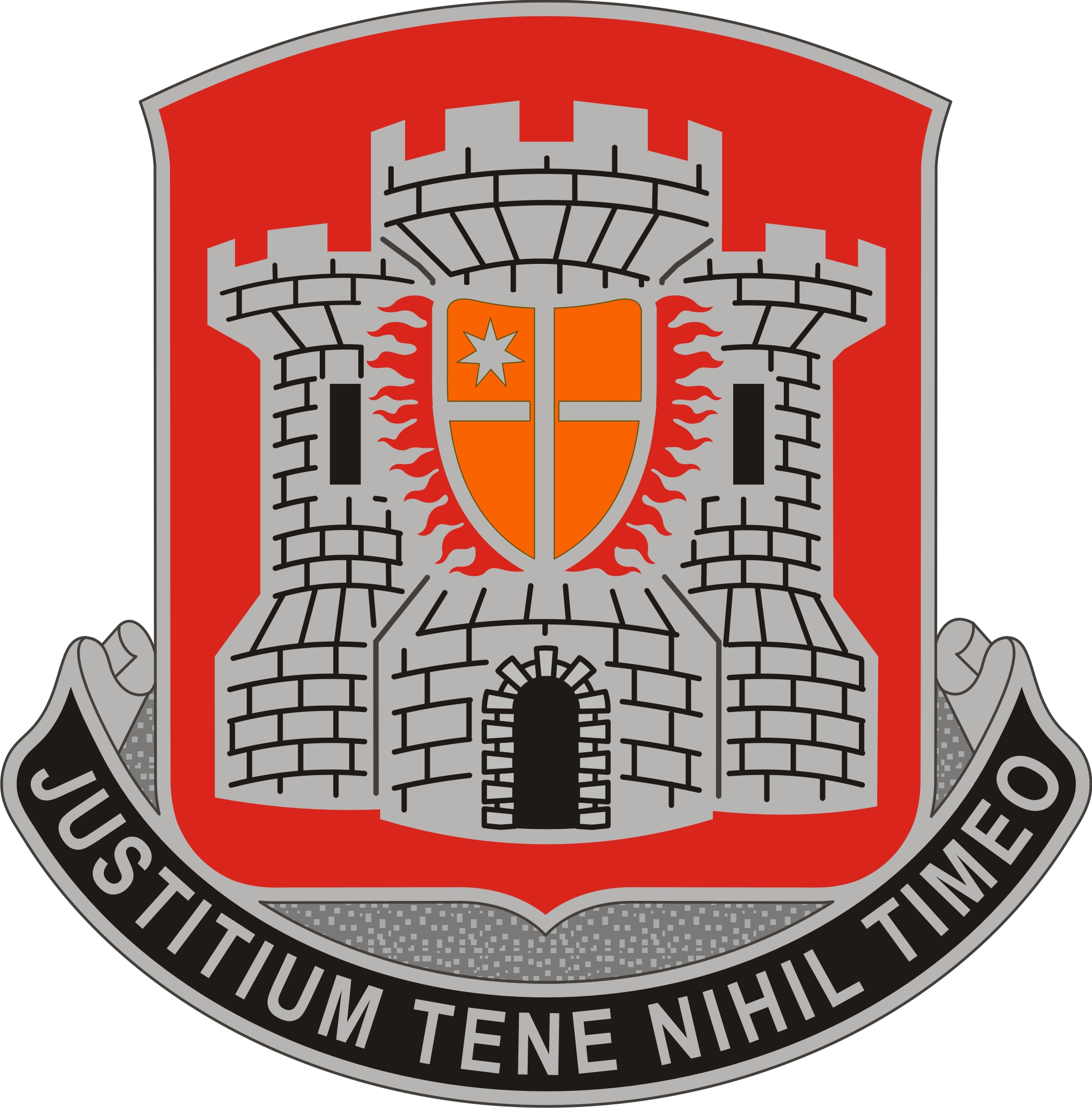
  - 779th Engineer Battalion
  - 221st Explosive Ordnance Disposal Company
  - 107th Mobile Public Affairs Detachment
  - 44th Weapons of Mass Destruction – Civil Support Team
  - 48th Weapons of Mass Destruction – Civil Support Team
