= List of current United States National Guard major generals =

List of current US National Guard two-star generals

Seal of the National Guard

This is a list of federally recognized major generals of the National Guard of the United States.

== Federal assignments ==
=== Department of Defense ===
==== Office of the Secretary of Defense ====
Position insignia	Position	Civilian occupation	Photo	Incumbent	Service branch
United States of America Vietnam War Commemoration	Director, United States of America Vietnam War Commemoration	Superintendent, Veteran's Haven North, New Jersey Department of Veterans Affairs		Major General; Edward J. Chrystal Jr.	U.S. Army
Office of the Assistant Secretary of Defense (Sustainment)	Executive Director, Joint Rapid Acquisition Cell (JRAC)	Not applicable		Major General; Edward L. Vaughan	U.S. Air Force

==== National intelligence agencies ====
Position insignia	Position	Civilian occupation	Photo	Incumbent	Service branch
Central Security Service	Mobilization Assistant to the Deputy Chief, Central Security Service (CSS)	Partner and Trial Attorney, Stinson LLP		Major General; Stephen E. Schemenauer	U.S. Army
Defense Intelligence Agency	Military and Mobilization Assistant to the Director, Defense Intelligence Agency (DIA)	Not applicable		Major General; Robert I. Kinney	U.S. Air Force

==== Joint Staff ====
Position insignia	Position	Civilian occupation	Photo	Incumbent	Service branch
Joint Staff	Deputy Director for Logistics Operations (J-4), Joint Staff	Not applicable		Major General; Nicole M. Balliet	U.S. Army
Joint Staff	Deputy Director for Joint Force Development (J-7), Joint Staff	Not applicable		Major General; Peter G. Bailey	U.S. Air Force

==== Unified combatant commands ====
Position insignia	Position	Civilian occupation	Photo	Incumbent	Service branch
U.S. Cyber Command National Security Agency	Air National Guard Assistant to the Commander, U.S. Cyber Command (USCYBERCOM) and Director, National Security Agency (NSA)	Artificial Intelligence Group Chief Engineer		Major General; Matthew D. Dinmore	U.S. Air Force
U.S. European Command	Director of Exercises and Assessments (ECJ7) and Reserve Component Advisor, U.S. European Command (USEUCOM)	Not applicable		Major General; James R. Kriesel	U.S. Air Force
U.S. Indo-Pacific Command	Mobilization Assistant to the Commander, U.S. Indo-Pacific Command (USINDOPACOM)	Not applicable		Major General; Christopher K. Faurot	U.S. Air Force
North American Aerospace Defense Command	Deputy Director of Operations (J-3), North American Aerospace Defense Command (NORAD)	Not applicable		Major General; Mark D. Piper	U.S. Air Force
U.S. Northern Command North American Aerospace Defense Command	Special Assistant to the Commander, U.S. Northern Command (USNORTHCOM) and North American Aerospace Defense Command (NORAD) for Reserve Matters	Not applicable		Major General; Bradford R. Everman	U.S. Air Force
U.S. Southern Command	Deputy Commander for Mobilization and Reserve Affairs, U.S. Southern Command (USSOUTHCOM)	Defense Security Cooperation Management Professional, U.S. Department of the Navy		Major General; Javier A. Reina	U.S. Army
U.S. Space Command	Director of Joint Exercises and Training (J-7), U.S. Space Command (USSPACECOM)	Not applicable		Major General; Samuel C. Keener	U.S. Air Force
U.S. Special Operations Command	Director of Joint SOF Force Development and Design (J-7) (Provisional), U.S. Special Operations Command (USSOCOM) and Deputy Commander for Mobilization and Reserve Affairs, U.S. Special Operations Command	Assistant Director (Lieutenant), Division of Drug and Crime, Missouri State Highway Patrol (MSHP)		Major General; Shawn R. Satterfield	U.S. Army
U.S. Strategic Command	Mobilization Assistant to the Deputy Commander, U.S. Strategic Command (USSTRATCOM)	Not applicable		Major General; Matthew A. Barker	U.S. Air Force
Joint Electromagnetic Spectrum Operations Center, U.S. Strategic Command	Director, Joint Electromagnetic Spectrum Operations Center, U.S. Strategic Command (USSTRATCOM)	Not applicable		Major General; AnnMarie K. Anthony	U.S. Air Force

==== National Guard Bureau ====
Position insignia	Position	Civilian occupation	Photo	Incumbent	Service branch
National Guard Bureau	Director of Staff, National Guard Bureau (NGB)	Not applicable		Major General; Darrin E. Slaten	U.S. Air Force
National Guard Bureau	Director of Manpower and Personnel (J-1), National Guard Bureau (NGB)	Not applicable		Major General; Wendy B. Wenke	U.S. Air Force
National Guard Bureau	Director, Domestic Operations (J-3/4), National Guard Bureau (NGB)	Not applicable		Major General; Ronald W. Burkett II	U.S. Army
National Guard Bureau	Director of Strategy, Policy, Plans, and International Affairs (J-5), National Guard Bureau (NGB)	Not applicable		Major General; William J. Edwards	U.S. Army
National Guard Bureau	Director, Force Development (J-7), National Guard Bureau (NGB)	Systems Engineering and Technical Advisor (SETA) Contractor; Senior Intelligence Analyst Auditor		Major General; Jerry F. Prochaska	U.S. Army
National Guard Bureau	Director, Office of the Joint Surgeon General, National Guard Bureau (NGB)	Not applicable		Major General; Lisa J. Hou	U.S. Army
National Guard Bureau	Director, Office of Legislative Liaison, National Guard Bureau (NGB)	Not applicable		Major General; Jennifer R. Mitchell	U.S. Army
National Guard Bureau Deputy Chief of Staff for Logistics (G-4)	National Guard Bureau Liaison, Office of the Deputy Chief of Staff for Logistics (G-4)	Deputy United States Property and Fiscal Officer (Title 5 Civilian), Flowood, Mississippi		Major General; Clint E. Walker	U.S. Army
National Guard Bureau	Principal Deputy General Counsel, National Guard Bureau (NGB)	Not applicable		Major General; Timothy L. Rieger	U.S. Army

==== Other joint positions ====
Position insignia	Position	Civilian occupation	Photo	Incumbent	Service branch
Sub-unified commands
ROK/U.S. Combined Forces Command U.S. Forces Korea	South Korea; Deputy Combined Rear Area Coordinator, ROK/U.S. Combined Forces Command (CFC) and U.S. Forces Korea (USFK)	Senior Manager, People Consulting, Ernst & Young		Major General; Justin W. Osberg	U.S. Army
Special activities
Joint Forces Staff College	Commandant, Joint Forces Staff College (JFSC)	Not applicable		Major General; Thomas D. Crimmins	U.S. Air Force
F-35 Lightning II Joint Program Office	Director, Lightning Sustainment Center, F-35 Lightning II Joint Program Office	Not applicable		Major General; Donald K. Carpenter	U.S. Air Force
Joint Task Force North	Commander, Joint Task Force North (JTF North)	Not applicable		Major General; Henry S. Dixon	U.S. Army
Allied Joint Force Command Brunssum	Netherlands; Deputy Chief of Staff for Operations, Allied Joint Force Command Brunssum (JFCBS)	Not applicable		Major General; Randolph J. Staudenraus	U.S. Air Force
	Germany; Deputy Commander, Security Assistance Group – Ukraine (SAG-U), Operation Atlantic Resolve (OAR)	Not applicable		Major General; Kevin V. Doyle	U.S. Air Force
	Poland; Deputy Commanding General, 2nd Polish Corps	Program Director, Kentucky Army National Guard		Major General; Bryan M. Howay	U.S. Army
U.S. Embassy and Consulate in the United Arab Emirates	United Arab Emirates; Senior Defense Official and Defense Attaché, United Arab Emirates (UAE)	Not applicable		Major General; Wendul G. Hagler II	U.S. Army

=== Department of the Army ===
Position insignia	Position	Civilian occupation	Photo	Incumbent	Service branch
Office of the Secretary
Office of the Assistant Secretary of the Army (Manpower and Reserve Affairs)	Senior Military Advisor to the Deputy Assistant Secretary of the Army, Manpower Policy and Quality of Life	Not applicable		Major General; Roy J. Macaraeg	U.S. Army

==== United States Army ====
Position insignia	Position	Civilian occupation	Photo	Incumbent	Service branch
Army National Guard
Army National Guard	Junior; Special Assistant to the Director, Army National Guard for Army Reserve Forces Policy (ARNG)	Chief Operating Officer, DirectViz Solutions, LLC		Major General; John M. Epperly	U.S. Army
Army National Guard	Junior; Special Assistant to the Director, Army National Guard for Army Cyber Matters (ARNG)	Director of Strategic Policy Initiatives and Associate Program Director (ISI) at OnDefend and Co-Founder and CEO at ShadowPoint, LLC		Major General; Teri D. Williams	U.S. Army
Army National Guard	Junior; Special Assistant to the Director, Army National Guard for XVIII Airborne Corps Matters (ARNG)	State Prosecutor, Virginia Beach		Major General; Joseph A. Dinonno	U.S. Army
Army National Guard	Junior; Special Assistant to the Director, Army National Guard	Not applicable		Major General; Joseph R. Baldwin	U.S. Army
Army commands
U.S. Army Forces Command	Deputy Commanding General, Army National Guard, U.S. Army Forces Command (FORSCOM)	Not applicable		Major General; Richard F. Johnson	U.S. Army
	Deputy Commanding General, Army National Guard, Transformation and Training Command (T2COM)	Chief Operating Director, Digital Battlespace Platform, Booz Allen Hamilton		Major General; Stephanie A. Purgerson	U.S. Army
U.S. Army Materiel Command	Assistant Deputy Commanding General, Army National Guard, U.S. Army Materiel Command (AMC)	Not applicable		Major General; Terry L. Grisham	U.S. Army
U.S. Army Combined Arms Center	Deputy Commanding General – Army National Guard, U.S. Army Combined Arms Center (USACAC)	Director of Design Assurance (Pre-Market) and Post Market Quality Assurance, Electrophysiology Franchise, Boston Scientific		Major General; Charles G. Kemper IV	U.S. Army
Army service component commands
U.S. Army Central	Deputy Commanding General, U.S. Army Central (ARCENT)	Dual Status Federal Technician (GS-15)		Major General; Michael J. Leeney	U.S. Army
U.S. Army Europe and Africa	Deputy Commanding General for Army National Guard, U.S. Army Europe and Africa (USAREUR-AF)	Not applicable		Major General; Levon E. Cumpton	U.S. Army
U.S. Army Pacific	Deputy Commanding General, Army National Guard, U.S. Army Pacific (USARPAC)	Not applicable		Major General; Lance A. Okamura	U.S. Army
U.S. Army North	Deputy Commanding General – Support, U.S. Army North (ARNORTH), Deputy Commanding General – National Guard, U.S. Army North and Commanding General, Task Force 51, U.S. Army North	T32 Dual Status Technician		Major General; Scott M. Sherman	U.S. Army
Direct reporting units
Judge Advocate General's Corps, U.S. Army	Judge Advocate General of the United States Army (TJAG)	District Attorney of the Columbia County Judicial Circuit		Major General; Bobby L. Christine	U.S. Army
U.S. Army Medical Command	Deputy Commanding General (Support) and Chief of Staff, U.S. Army Medical Command (MEDCOM)	Not applicable		Major General; Jill K. Faris	U.S. Army
Operating forces
First Army	Deputy Commanding General (Operations), First Army	Division Command Group Officer-in-Charge, Pennsylvania Department of Military and Veterans Affairs		Major General; Mark D. McCormack	U.S. Army
In transit
		General Manager, City of Corinth Gas and Water Department		Major General; John M. Rhodes	U.S. Army

=== Department of the Air Force ===
==== United States Air Force ====
Position insignia	Position	Civilian occupation	Photo	Incumbent	Service branch
Air National Guard
Air National Guard	Director, Air National Guard (ANG) and Deputy Director, Air National Guard	Not applicable		Major General; Duke A. Pirak; Acting	U.S. Air Force
Air National Guard	Junior; Special Assistant to the Director, Air National Guard (ANG)	Not applicable		Major General; Bryony A. Terrell	U.S. Air Force
Air National Guard First Air Force	Junior; Special Assistant to the Director, Air National Guard (ANG) and Deputy, Combined Force Air Component Commander, First Air Force (Air Forces Northern and Air Forces Space) (1 AF-AFNORTH & AFSPACE)	Not applicable		Major General; Randal K. Efferson	U.S. Air Force
Air Staff
Air Staff	Assistant Deputy Chief of Staff for Operations (A3)	Not applicable		Major General; Akshai M. Gandhi	U.S. Air Force
Air Staff	Deputy Director of Programs, Office of the Deputy Chief of Staff for Plans and Programs (A8P)	Not applicable		Major General; Michele L. Kilgore	U.S. Air Force
Judge Advocate General's Corps, U.S. Air Force	Air National Guard Assistant to the Judge Advocate General of the United States Air Force and Space Force	U.S. Bankruptcy Judge for the Middle District of Tennessee		Major General; Charles M. Walker	U.S. Air Force
U.S. Air Force Medical Service	Air National Guard Assistant to the Surgeon General of the United States Air Force and United States Space Force (AF/SG & SF/SG) and Director of Space Force Medical Operations	Not applicable		Major General; Sean T. Collins	U.S. Air Force
Air Force major commands
Air Combat Command	Air National Guard Assistant to the Commander, Air Combat Command (ACC)	First Officer, FedEx		Major General; Bryan E. Salmon	U.S. Air Force
Air Education and Training Command	Air National Guard Assistant to the Commander, Air Education and Training Command (AETC)	First Officer, Atlas Air and Founder, Deep Cove Associates		Major General; Frank W. Roy	U.S. Air Force
Air Force Global Strike Command	Air National Guard Assistant to the Commander, Air Force Global Strike Command (AFGSC)	Not applicable		Major General; Kenneth S. Eaves	U.S. Air Force
Air Force Materiel Command	Air National Guard Assistant to the Commander, Air Force Materiel Command (AFMC)	Not applicable		Major General; Virginia I. Gaglio	U.S. Air Force
Air Force Special Operations Command	Air National Guard Assistant to the Commander, Air Force Special Operations Command (AFSOC)	Not applicable		Major General; Benjamin M. Cason	U.S. Air Force
Air Mobility Command	Air National Guard Assistant to the Commander, Air Mobility Command (AMC)	Not applicable		Major General; Gary A. McCue	U.S. Air Force
Pacific Air Forces	Director, Strategy, Plans, Programs and Requirements (A-5/8), Headquarters Pacific Air Forces (PACAF)	Pilot, United Airlines		Major General; Christopher J. Sheppard	U.S. Air Force
	Commander, Integrated Capabilities Command (Provisional)	Not applicable		Major General; Mark W. Mitchum	U.S. Air Force
Numbered air forces
First Air Force (Air Forces Northern and Air Forces Space)	Deputy Commander, First Air Force (Air Forces Northern/AFNORTH and Air Forces Space/AFSPACE) (1 AF)	Not applicable		Major General; Michael A. Valle	U.S. Air Force
First Air Force Continental U.S. NORAD Region – Air Forces Northern	Air National Guard Assistant to the Commander, Continental U.S. NORAD Region (CONR) and Commander, First Air Force (Air Forces Northern and Air Forces Space) (1 AF-AFNORTH & AFSPACE)	Not applicable		Major General; Michael A. Valle	U.S. Air Force
Ninth Air Force U.S. Air Forces Central Command	Air National Guard Assistant to the Commander, Ninth Air Force (Air Forces Central) (9 AF-AFCENT)	Not applicable		Major General; Paul D. Johnson	U.S. Air Force
Sixteenth Air Force Air Forces Cyber	Air National Guard Assistant to the Commander, Sixteenth Air Force (Air Forces Cyber) (16 AF-AFCYBER)	Founder and Chief Executive Officer, Civilian Reserve Information Sharing and Analysis Center (CR-ISAC)		Major General; Victor R. Macias	U.S. Air Force

== State assignments ==
=== State adjutants general ===
==== Pacific Region ====
Position insignia	Position	Civilian occupation	Photo	Incumbent	Service branch
Alaska National Guard
State of Alaska	The Adjutant General, Alaska and Commissioner, Alaska Department of Military and Veterans Affairs	Not applicable		Major General (Note: Holds state rank of lieutenant general in the Alaska National Guard.); Torrence W. Saxe	U.S. Air Force
California National Guard
California National Guard	The Adjutant General, California	Not applicable		Major General; Matthew P. Beevers	U.S. Army
California Army National Guard	Assistant Adjutant General, California and Commander, California Army National Guard (CA ARNG)	Not applicable		Major General; Jeffrey D. Smiley	U.S. Army
California Air National Guard Defense Innovation Unit	Commander, California Air National Guard (CA ANG) and Military Deputy to the Secretary of Defense for the Defense Innovation Unit (DIU)	Not applicable		Major General; Steven J. Butow	U.S. Air Force
Hawaii National Guard
Hawaii National Guard	The Adjutant General, Hawaii and Director, Hawaii Emergency Management Agency (HI-EMA)	Not applicable		Major General; Stephen F. Logan	U.S. Army
Hawaii Air National Guard	Chief of Staff and Commander, Hawaii Air National Guard (HI ANG)	Not applicable		Major General; Joseph R. Harris II	U.S. Air Force
Washington National Guard
Washington National Guard Assistant Secretary of the Air Force (Manpower and Reserve Affairs)	The Adjutant General, Washington, Director, Washington Military Department and Assistant to the Assistant Secretary of the Air Force (Manpower and Reserve Affairs) (SAF/MR)	Not applicable		Major General; Gent Welsh Jr.	U.S. Air Force

==== Mountain states ====
Position insignia	Position	Civilian occupation	Photo	Incumbent	Service branch
Arizona National Guard
Arizona Department of Emergency and Military Affairs	The Adjutant General, Arizona and Director, Arizona Department of Emergency and Military Affairs	Not applicable		Major General; Kerry L. Muehlenbeck	U.S. Air Force
Arizona Air National Guard Deputy Under Secretary of the Air Force for International Affairs	Assistant Adjutant General for Air – Arizona and Air National Guard Assistant to the Secretary of the Air Force for International Affairs (SAF/IA)	Not applicable		Major General; Troy T. Daniels	U.S. Air Force
Colorado National Guard
Colorado National Guard	The Adjutant General, Colorado	Not applicable		Major General; Robert B. Davis	U.S. Army
Idaho National Guard
Idaho National Guard	The Adjutant General, Idaho and Commanding General, Idaho National Guard	Not applicable		Major General; Timothy J. Donnellan	U.S. Air Force
New Mexico National Guard
New Mexico National Guard	The Adjutant General, New Mexico and Secretary, New Mexico Department of Homeland Security and Emergency Management (DHSEM)	Major, New Mexico State Police (NMSP)		Major General; Miguel Aguilar; Acting	U.S. Army
Utah National Guard
Utah National Guard	The Adjutant General, Utah	Not applicable		Major General; Daniel D. Boyack	U.S. Air Force
Wyoming National Guard
Wyoming National Guard	The Adjutant General, Wyoming	Not applicable		Major General; Gregory C. Porter	U.S. Army

==== East North Central Region ====
Position insignia	Position	Civilian occupation	Photo	Incumbent	Service branch
Illinois National Guard
Illinois National Guard	The Adjutant General, Illinois and Director, Illinois Department of Military Affairs	Program Analyst III, AASKI-MAG Aerospace		Major General; Rodney C. Boyd	U.S. Army
Illinois Air National Guard	Assistant Adjutant General – Air, Illinois National Guard (ILNG)	Not applicable		Major General; Daniel R. McDonough	U.S. Air Force
Michigan National Guard
Michigan National Guard	The Adjutant General, Michigan and Director, Michigan Department of Military and Veterans Affairs	Not applicable		Major General; Paul D. Rogers Jr.	U.S. Army
Ohio National Guard
Ohio Air National Guard	Assistant Adjutant General for Air, Ohio and Commander, Ohio Air National Guard (OH ANG)	Not applicable		Major General; David B. Johnson	U.S. Air Force

==== West North Central Region ====
Position insignia	Position	Civilian occupation	Photo	Incumbent	Service branch
Iowa National Guard
Iowa National Guard	The Adjutant General, Iowa	Not applicable		Major General; Stephen E. Osborn	U.S. Army
Kansas National Guard
The Adjutant General, Kansas	The Adjutant General, Kansas, Director, Kansas Division of Emergency Management (KDEM) and Director, Kansas Homeland Security Office	Not applicable		Major General; Michael T. Venerdi	U.S. Air Force
Minnesota National Guard
Minnesota National Guard	The Adjutant General, Minnesota	Not applicable		Major General; Shawn P. Manke	U.S. Army
Minnesota National Guard U.S. Army Cyber Center of Excellence	Deputy Adjutant General, Minnesota and Deputy Commanding General, Army National Guard, U.S. Army Cyber Center of Excellence (CCoE)	Chief Information Security Officer, City of St. Paul		Major General; Stefanie K. Horvath	U.S. Army
Missouri National Guard
Missouri National Guard	The Adjutant General, Missouri	Not applicable		Major General; Charles D. Hausman	U.S. Army
Nebraska National Guard
Nebraska National Guard	The Adjutant General, Nebraska, Director, Nebraska Military Department and Director, Nebraska Emergency Management Agency (NEMA)	Not applicable		Major General; Craig W. Strong	U.S. Army

==== New England ====
Position insignia	Position	Civilian occupation	Photo	Incumbent	Service branch
Connecticut National Guard
Connecticut National Guard	The Adjutant General, Connecticut	Not applicable		Major General; Francis J. Evon Jr.	U.S. Army
Massachusetts National Guard
Massachusetts National Guard	The Adjutant General, Massachusetts, Co-Chair, Air Reserves Policy Committee and Co-Chair, Major Command Air Reserve Forces Policy and Advisory Council	Not applicable		Major General; Gary W. Keefe	U.S. Air Force
New Hampshire National Guard
New Hampshire National Guard	The Adjutant General, New Hampshire and Commissioner, New Hampshire Department of Military Affairs and Veterans Services (DMAVS)	Not applicable		Major General; David J. Mikolaities	U.S. Army
Rhode Island National Guard
	The Adjutant General, Rhode Island	Not applicable		Major General; Andrew J. Chevalier	U.S. Army
Vermont National Guard
Vermont National Guard	The Adjutant General, Vermont	Not applicable		Major General; Gregory C. Knight	U.S. Army

==== Mid-Atlantic Region ====
Position insignia	Position	Civilian occupation	Photo	Incumbent	Service branch
Delaware National Guard
Delaware National Guard	The Adjutant General, Delaware	Not applicable		Major General; James A. Benson	U.S. Army
Maryland National Guard
Maryland National Guard	The Adjutant General, Maryland	Senior Advisor, U.S. Department of the Interior		Major General; Janeen L. Birckhead	U.S. Army
New York National Guard
State of New York New York Army National Guard	The Adjutant General, New York and Commander, New York Army National Guard (NY ARNG)	Not applicable		Major General; Raymond F. Shields Jr.	U.S. Army
State of New York	Assistant Adjutant General – Army, New York	Not applicable		Major General; Michel A. Natali	U.S. Army
New York Air National Guard	Commander, New York Air National Guard (NY ANG) and Assistant Adjutant General – Air, New York	Not applicable		Major General; Gary R. Charlton II	U.S. Air Force
Pennsylvania National Guard
Pennsylvania National Guard	The Adjutant General, Pennsylvania	Not applicable		Major General; John R. Pippy	U.S. Army
Pennsylvania Army National Guard	Deputy Adjutant General – Army, Pennsylvania	Not applicable		Major General; Laura A. McHugh	U.S. Army
Pennsylvania Air National Guard	Deputy Adjutant General – Air, Pennsylvania	Not applicable		Major General; Terrence L. Koudelka Jr.	U.S. Air Force
Virginia National Guard
Virginia National Guard	The Adjutant General, Virginia	Not applicable		Major General; James W. Ring	U.S. Army

==== South Atlantic Region ====
Position insignia	Position	Civilian occupation	Photo	Incumbent	Service branch
Florida National Guard
Florida National Guard	The Adjutant General, Florida	Not applicable		Major General; John D. Haas	U.S. Army
Florida Army National Guard	Assistant Adjutant General – Army, Florida and Commander, Florida Army National Guard (FL ARNG)	Vice President, Science Applications International Corporation (SAIC)		Major General; Robert G. Carruthers III	U.S. Army
Georgia National Guard
Georgia National Guard	The Adjutant General, Georgia	Not applicable		Major General; Richard D. Wilson	U.S. Army
Georgia Air National Guard U.S. Transportation Command	Assistant Adjutant General – Air, Georgia, Commander, Georgia Air National Guard (GA ANG) and Air National Guard Assistant to the Commander, U.S. Transportation Command (USTRANSCOM)	Pilot, Delta Air Lines		Major General; Konata A. Crumbly	U.S. Air Force
North Carolina National Guard
North Carolina National Guard	The Adjutant General, North Carolina	Not applicable		Major General; Marvin T. Hunt	U.S. Army
North Carolina National Guard	Assistant Adjutant General, North Carolina	Not applicable		Major General; Robert A. Boyette	U.S. Army
South Carolina National Guard
South Carolina National Guard	The Adjutant General, South Carolina	Judge, South Carolina Circuit Court		Major General; Robin B. Stilwell	U.S. Army
South Carolina National Guard	Assistant Adjutant General, South Carolina	Not applicable		Major General; Jeffrey A. Jones	U.S. Army

==== East South Central states ====
Position insignia	Position	Civilian occupation	Photo	Incumbent	Service branch
Alabama National Guard
Alabama National Guard	The Adjutant General, Alabama	Not applicable		Major General; David K. Pritchett	U.S. Army
Alabama National Guard	Deputy Adjutant General, Alabama	Senior Sales Specialist, GlaxoSmithKline Pharmaceuticals		Major General; Roger A. Presley Jr.	U.S. Army
Kentucky National Guard
Kentucky National Guard	The Adjutant General, Kentucky	Not applicable		Major General; Haldane B. Lamberton	U.S. Army
Mississippi National Guard
Mississippi Air National Guard	Assistant Adjutant General – Air, Mississippi and Commander, Mississippi Air National Guard (MSANG)	Not applicable		Major General; Edward H. Evans Jr.	U.S. Air Force
Tennessee National Guard
Tennessee National Guard	The Adjutant General, Tennessee and Commissioner, Tennessee Military Department	Not applicable		Major General; Warner A. Ross II	U.S. Army

==== West South Central states ====
Position insignia	Position	Civilian occupation	Photo	Incumbent	Service branch
Louisiana National Guard
Louisiana National Guard	The Adjutant General, Louisiana	Not applicable		Major General; Thomas C. Friloux	U.S. Army
Oklahoma National Guard
Oklahoma National Guard	The Adjutant General, Oklahoma	State Resource Manager/Executive Director, Oklahoma Military Department		Major General; Thomas H. Mancino	U.S. Army
Texas National Guard
Texas National Guard	The Adjutant General, Texas	Not applicable		Major General; Thomas M. Suelzer	U.S. Air Force

==== Non-state territories ====
Position insignia	Position	Civilian occupation	Photo	Incumbent	Service branch
Puerto Rico National Guard
Puerto Rico National Guard	The Adjutant General, Puerto Rico	Human Resources Officer, Puerto Rico Army National Guard, Title 5 National Guard Employee (GS-14)		Major General; Miguel A. Méndez	U.S. Army
Virgin Islands National Guard
Virgin Islands National Guard	The Adjutant General, Virgin Islands	Not applicable		Major General; Kodjo S. Knox-Limbacker	U.S. Army

=== Units and formations ===
Position insignia	Position	Civilian occupation	Photo	Incumbent	Service branch
National Guard divisions
28th Infantry Division	Commanding General, 28th Infantry Division	State Trooper, Pennsylvania State Police		Major General; Michael E. Wegscheider	U.S. Army
35th Infantry Division	Commanding General, 35th Infantry Division	Associate Vice President for Clinical Practice, Texas Tech University Health Sciences Center and Executive Associate Dean, Texas Tech University Health Sciences Center School of Medicine		Major General; Martin M. Clay Jr.	U.S. Army
36th Infantry Division	Commanding General, 36th Infantry Division	Not applicable		Major General; John B. Bowlin	U.S. Army
38th Infantry Division Task Force Spartan	Commanding General, 38th Infantry Division and Commander, Task Force Spartan	Manufacturing Director, Nissan USA		Major General; Daniel A. Degelow	U.S. Army
40th Infantry Division	Commanding General, 40th Infantry Division	Global Category Director, Special Field Systems, Nike, Inc.		Major General; William J. Prendergast IV	U.S. Army
42nd Infantry Division	Commanding General, 42nd Infantry Division	Vice President, New York Life Insurance Company		Major General; Jack A. James Jr.	U.S. Army
Other commands
46th Military Police Command	Commanding General, 46th Military Police Command	President and Chief Operating Officer, CG Financial Services		Major General; Scott W. Hiipakka	U.S. Army
167th Theater Sustainment Command	Commanding General, 167th Theater Sustainment Command	Principal, Central High School		Major General; Thomas M. Vickers Jr.	U.S. Army
263rd Army Air and Missile Defense Command	Commanding General, 263rd Army Air and Missile Defense Command	Production Manager – SVCO, Michelin		Major General; Richard A. Wholey Jr.	U.S. Army
In transit
		Senior Manager for Software Engineering, Broadridge Financial Solutions		Major General; John W. Rueger	U.S. Army

== Pending appointments ==
=== United States Army ===
Photo	Name	Service branch	Status and date
Nominations (2025)
	Brigadier General; Monie R. Ulis	U.S. Army	Confirmed by the Senate; 19 September 2025
Nominations (2024)
	Brigadier General; Gary A. Ropers	U.S. Army	Confirmed by the Senate; 24 September 2024
	Brigadier General; Troy E. Armstrong	U.S. Army	Confirmed by the Senate; 31 July 2024
	Brigadier General; Sean T. Boyette	U.S. Army	Confirmed by the Senate; 31 July 2024
	Brigadier General; Joseph A. Hopkins III	U.S. Army	Confirmed by the Senate; 31 July 2024
	Brigadier General; Derek N. Lipson	U.S. Army	Confirmed by the Senate; 31 July 2024
	Brigadier General; Jason P. Nelson	U.S. Army	Confirmed by the Senate; 31 July 2024
	Brigadier General; Bren D. Rogers	U.S. Army	Confirmed by the Senate; 31 July 2024
	Brigadier General; James P. Schreffler	U.S. Army	Confirmed by the Senate; 31 July 2024
Nominations (2023)
	Brigadier General; Cindy H. Haygood	U.S. Army	Confirmed by the Senate; 5 December 2023
	Brigadier General; Corwin J. Lusk	U.S. Army	Confirmed by the Senate; 5 December 2023
	Brigadier General; Isabel R. Smith	U.S. Army	Confirmed by the Senate; 5 December 2023
	Brigadier General; Katherine E. White	U.S. Army	Confirmed by the Senate; 5 December 2023
	Brigadier General; Jackie A. Huber	U.S. Army	Confirmed by the Senate; 5 December 2023
Nominations (2021)
	Brigadier General; David M. Jenkins	U.S. Army	Confirmed by the Senate; 24 June 2021

=== United States Air Force ===
Photo	Name	Service branch	Status and date
Nominations (2025)
	Brigadier General; Lisa K. Snyder	U.S. Air Force	Confirmed by the Senate; 30 October 2025
	Brigadier General; Humberto Pabon Jr.	U.S. Air Force	Confirmed by the Senate; 19 September 2025
	Brigadier General; Christopher M. Blomquist	U.S. Air Force	Confirmed by the Senate; 19 September 2025
	Brigadier General; Christopher A. Jarratt	U.S. Air Force	Confirmed by the Senate; 30 October 2025
	Brigadier General; James D. Cleet	U.S. Air Force	Confirmed by the Senate; 19 September 2025
	Brigadier General; Jason W. Knight	U.S. Air Force	Confirmed by the Senate; 19 September 2025
	Brigadier General; Gregory A. Krane	U.S. Air Force	Confirmed by the Senate; 19 September 2025
	Brigadier General; Shawn M. Coco	U.S. Air Force	Confirmed by the Senate; 19 September 2025
	Brigadier General; Sean F. Conroy	U.S. Air Force	Confirmed by the Senate; 19 September 2025
	Brigadier General; Buel J. Dickson	U.S. Air Force	Confirmed by the Senate; 19 September 2025
	Brigadier General; D. Micah Fesler	U.S. Air Force	Confirmed by the Senate; 19 September 2025
	Brigadier General; Robert E. Hargens	U.S. Air Force	Confirmed by the Senate; 19 September 2025
	Brigadier General; Troy D. Havener	U.S. Air Force	Confirmed by the Senate; 19 September 2025
	Brigadier General; Patrick L. Lanaghan	U.S. Air Force	Confirmed by the Senate; 19 September 2025
	Brigadier General; William M. Leahy	U.S. Air Force	Confirmed by the Senate; 19 September 2025
	Brigadier General; Allison C. Miller	U.S. Air Force	Confirmed by the Senate; 19 September 2025
	Major General (SD); Mark R. Morrell	U.S. Air Force	Confirmed by the Senate; 19 September 2025
	Brigadier General; Joseph F. Morrissey Jr.	U.S. Air Force	Confirmed by the Senate; 19 September 2025
	Brigadier General; James R. Parry	U.S. Air Force	Confirmed by the Senate; 19 September 2025
	Brigadier General; Carla R. Riner	U.S. Air Force	Confirmed by the Senate; 19 September 2025
	Brigadier General; Stephanie S. Samenus	U.S. Air Force	Confirmed by the Senate; 19 September 2025
Nominations (2024)
	Brigadier General; Cassandra D. Howard	U.S. Air Force	Confirmed by the Senate; 31 July 2024
	Brigadier General; Sue Ellen Schuerman	U.S. Air Force	Confirmed by the Senate; 31 July 2024
	Brigadier General; Jori A. Robinson	U.S. Air Force	Confirmed by the Senate; 31 July 2024
	Brigadier General; Michael D. Stohler	U.S. Air Force	Confirmed by the Senate; 31 July 2024
	Brigadier General; Henry U. Harder	U.S. Air Force	Confirmed by the Senate; 31 July 2024
	Brigadier General; Erik A. Peterson	U.S. Air Force	Confirmed by the Senate; 31 July 2024
	Brigadier General; Kimbra L. Sterr	U.S. Air Force	Confirmed by the Senate; 31 July 2024
Nominations (2022)
	Brigadier General; Gerald E. McDonald Jr.	U.S. Air Force	Confirmed by the Senate; 17 February 2022

== See also ==
- List of United States military leaders by rank
- List of United States Army four-star generals
- List of United States Marine Corps four-star generals
- List of United States Navy four-star admirals
- List of United States Air Force four-star generals
- List of United States Space Force four-star generals
- List of United States Coast Guard four-star admirals
- List of United States Public Health Service Commissioned Corps four-star admirals
- List of active duty United States three-star officers
- List of active duty United States Army major generals
- List of active duty United States Marine Corps major generals
- List of active duty United States rear admirals
- List of active duty United States Air Force major generals
- List of active duty United States Space Force general officers
- List of active duty United States senior enlisted leaders and advisors
