= Chariton, Missouri =

Unincorporated community in Missouri, United States

Coordinates: 40.5702984°N 92.7813081°W

Chariton is an unincorporated community in northeast Putnam County, in the U.S. state of Missouri.

== History ==
A post office called Chariton was established in 1883 and remained in operation until 1907. The community takes its name from the nearby Chariton River.

== Geography ==
Chariton is on Missouri Route DD two miles east of Missouri Route 149. The Missouri-Iowa border is one mile north of the community. Unionville is approximately 15 miles to the southwest.

== Notable people ==
- Nick Cave, sculptor and dancer, lived on a farm in Chariton with his grandparents, where he would help take care of crops and chickens.
- Ennis H. Gipson, third Adjutant General of Oklahoma who also served on the Texas House of Representatives.
- James Semple, politician from Illinois, moved to Chariton in 1819, operating a tannery in the area.
