= Oklahoma National Guard =

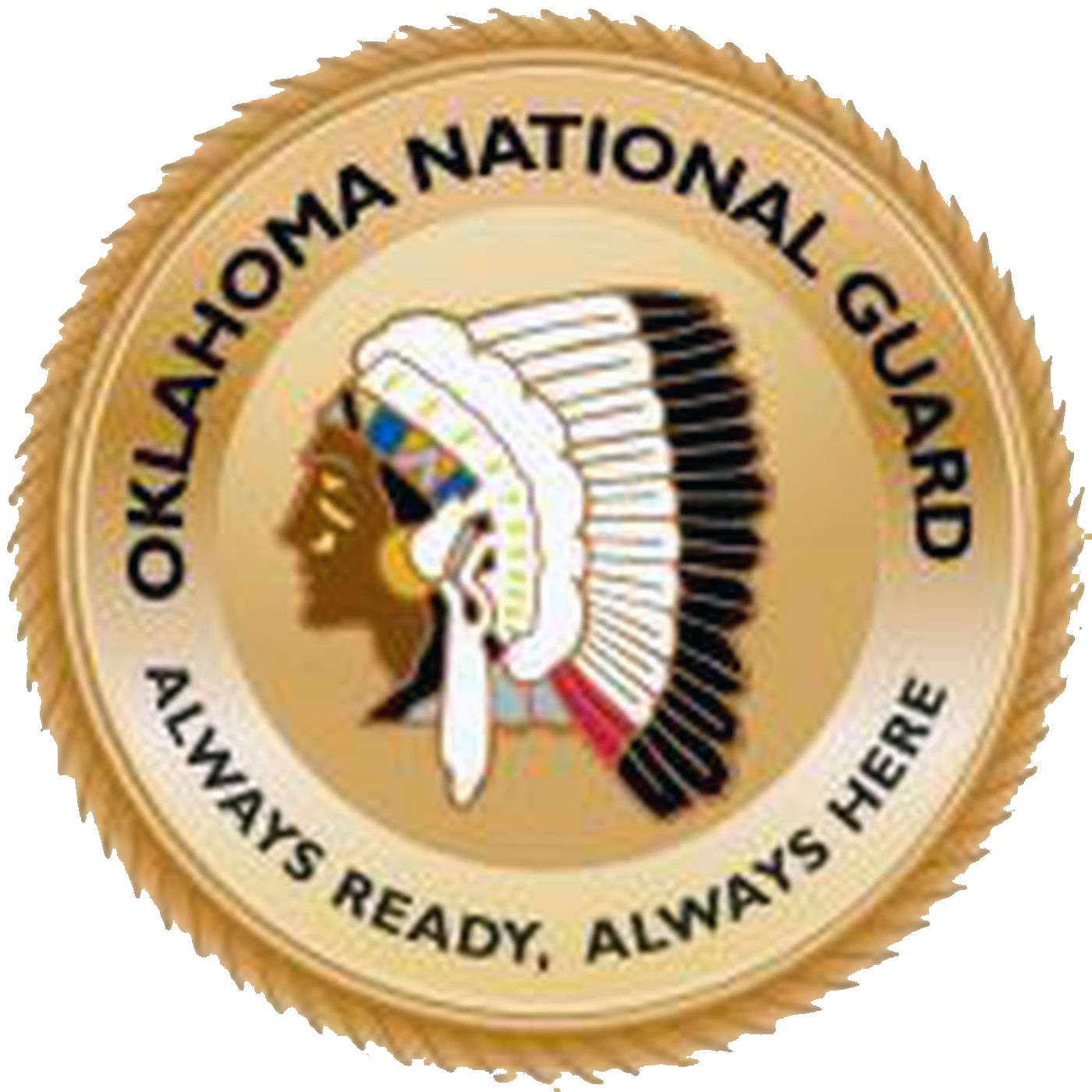
- Seal of the Oklahoma National Guard
- Active: May 16, 1951 – present
- Country: United States of America
- Allegiance: State of Oklahoma
- Size: 7,385 (Army Guard); 2,570 (Air Guard)
- Part of: U.S. National Guard
- Garrison/HQ: Oklahoma City, Oklahoma, U.S.

Commanders
- Current commander: Governor: Kevin Stitt; TAG: Maj. Gen. Thomas H. Mancino

The Oklahoma National Guard, a division of the Oklahoma Military Department, is the component of the United States National Guard in the U.S. state of Oklahoma. It comprises both Army (OKARNG) and Air (OKANG) National Guard components. The governor of Oklahoma is Commander-in-Chief of the Oklahoma National Guard when not on federal active duty. The state's highest-ranking military commander, the Adjutant General of Oklahoma (TAG), serves as the military head of the Guard and is second only to the governor. The TAG is served by Assistant Adjutants General, all brigadier generals, from the OKARNG and OKANG. The two components each have a senior noncommissioned officer, State Command Sergeant Major for Army and State Command Chief Master Sergeant for Air. The TAG is also served by his Director of the Joint Staff or Chief of Staff, who has direct oversight of the state's full-time National Guard military personnel and civilian employees.

The governor may call individuals or units of the Guard into state service during emergencies or to assist in special situations which require the Guard. In its state role, the Guard serves to execute state laws, protect the public health, suppress insurrection, and repel invasion.

The National Guard may be called into federal service in response to a call by the president of the United States or U.S. Congress. When National Guard troops are called to federal service, the president serves as commander-in-chief.

== Mission ==
The National Guard has two missions, a Title 10 federal mission and the other a Title 32 state controlled mission.

Federal mission statement:

During peacetime each state National Guard answers to the leadership in the 50 states, three territories and the District of Columbia. During national emergencies, however, the President reserves the right to mobilize the National Guard, putting them in federal duty status. While federalized, the units answer to the combatant commander of the theatre in which they are operating and, ultimately, to the President. Even when not federalized, the Army National Guard has a federal obligation (or mission.) That mission is to maintain properly trained and equipped units, available for prompt mobilization for war, national emergency, or as otherwise needed. The Army National Guard is a partner with the Active Army and the Army Reserves in fulfilling the country's military needs.

State mission statement:

The Army National Guard exists in all 50 states, three territories and the District of Columbia. The state, territory or district leadership are the commanders in chief for each Guard. Their adjutants general are answerable to them for the training and readiness of the units. At the state level, the governors reserve the ability, under the Constitution of the United States, to call up members of the National Guard in time of domestic emergencies or need.

== Current units ==
Oklahoma National Guard, Joint Forces Headquarters

- Oklahoma Army National Guard
  - 90th Troop Command
    - 120th Engineer Battalion
    - 345th Combat Sustainment Support Battalion
    - 63rd Civil Support Team (WMD)
    - 145th Army Band
    - 145th Mobile Public Affairs Detachment
  - 45th Infantry Brigade Combat Team
    - 1-180th Cavalry Squadron
    - 1-179th Infantry Battalion
    - 1-279th Infantry Battalion
    - 1-160th Field Artillery Battalion
    - 700th Brigade Support Battalion
    - 545th Brigade Engineer Battalion
  - 45th Field Artillery Brigade
    - B Battery, 171st Field Artillery (Target Acquisition)
    - 1-158th Field Artillery Battalion (HIMARS)
    - 205th Signal Company (Network Support Company)
    - 271st Brigade Support Battalion
    - 120th Forward Support Company (HIMARS)
  - 189th Regiment - Oklahoma Regional Training Institute
    - 1-189th Field Artillery Battalion
    - 2-189th (General Services) Field Artillery Battalion
  - Camp Gruber Training Center
- Oklahoma Air National Guard
  - 137th Special Operations Wing
    - 137th Operations Group
    - 137th Mission Support Group
    - 137th Medical Group
  - 138th Fighter Wing
    - 124th Space Superiority Squadron
    - 125th Fighter Squadron (F-16)
    - 125th Mobile Oppression Squadron
    - 125th Weather Flight
    - 219th Electronics Engineering and Radar Installation Squadron

== History ==
One of the first accomplishments of the Oklahoma Territorial Legislature was the creation of the Oklahoma Territorial Militia in 1890 The militia was officially renamed the Oklahoma Territorial National Guard on March 8, 1895. This first National Guard in what would become Oklahoma consisted of separate infantry companies, cavalry troops and artillery batteries and total strength was limited to 500 men.

Between 1864 and 1895 the militias of the State of Colorado and the Territories of New Mexico, Oklahoma and Arizona grew more organized as they continued to counter incursions and harassing attacks by Native Americans against white settlers. These militias would eventually organize into most of the National Guard units which would make up the 45th Infantry Division. In 1890 the Militia of the Territory of Oklahoma was formed. The four militias were mobilized in 1898 during the Spanish–American War but only forces in Arizona, Colorado and New Mexico were deployed, and fought in Cuba and the Philippines. In the early 1900s the National Guard was employed putting down various labor disputes.

With no pay or benefits for members, and officers required to furnish their own uniforms and horses, nevertheless, these militia forces maintained peace and assisted in emergencies in their territories. They also stood ready to serve the nation if wars were to come.

=== Spanish–American War ===
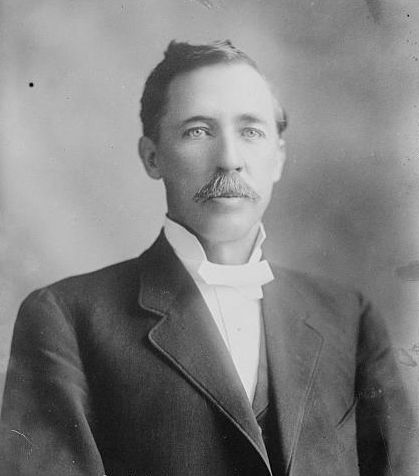
Governor Lee Cruce

After the sinking of the Battleship Maine on February 15, 1898, war was declared between the United States and Spain. Congress passed a volunteer bill allowing National Guard units to serve in the regular army as state units, with the approval of their governors. The Oklahoma National Guard was not federalized during the Spanish–American War, but numerous officers and enlisted men served with the Rough Riders and with the First Territorial Volunteer Infantry Regiment, the latter, (predecessor to today's 1-180th Cavalry Squadron) was mobilized, but not deployed before the war ended. Many of those early Guardsmen who served could not be recognized by the federal Army at their ranks and positions, especially the officers, and so they enlisted as privates, with many swiftly demonstrating their abilities and being promoted accordingly.

In 1899, the Oklahoma National Guard was reorganized as the First Oklahoma Infantry Regiment, supported by a signal company. In 1903, an engineer company was added. Federal allotments to support the troops would later double and the Territorial legislature voted to expand support in money and men. With statehood, in 1907, the Territorial status of the Oklahoma National Guard came to an end. Units were moved from western Oklahoma (former Oklahoma Territory) to eastern Oklahoma (former Indian Territory), and a hospital unit and two cavalry troops were added. Before World War I the guardsmen were used by Gov. Lee Cruce (pictured left) to combat illegal boxing and horse racing operations and liquor- and blue-law violations.

=== Mexican border duty ===
The National Defense Act (The Dick Act) passed on June 3, 1916 which formally created the National Guard as a reserve component of the US Army, and fifteen days later the Oklahoma National Guard was called into federal service for duty along the Mexican border. After mobilization in Oklahoma City, the guardsmen moved to San Benito and Donna, Texas. They returned home after guarding the border, tedious duty, but one which gave them valuable field experience, and were mustered out on March 12, 1917. Colonel Roy Hoffman commanded the regiment, and Captain William S. Key was in charge of a company from Wewoka. Both were later to be commanders of the 45th Division. They returned to Oklahoma to be discharged just in time to be called up for World War I.

=== World War One ===
The First Oklahoma Infantry was mobilized for service in World War I on March 31, 1917. At Camp Bowie, Texas, the First Oklahoma combined with the Seventh Texas Infantry to form the 142d Regiment of the Thirty-sixth Infantry Division. The guardsmen arrived in France on July 31, 1918, and in October served around Blanc Mont Ridge and in the Ferme Forest. One of the machine gun companies was commanded by Captain Raymond S. McLain, who in World War II would attain the highest combat command position ever to be reached by a National Guardsman. This was as commanding general of the XIX U. S. Army Corps. The 142nd Regiment was part of the capture of St. Etienne on October 9, 1918. They were in reserve when the war ended on November 11, 1918. The troops were discharged in July 1919.

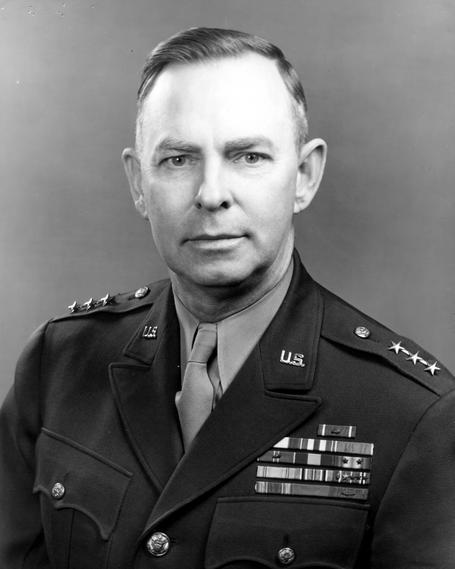
General Raymond McLain

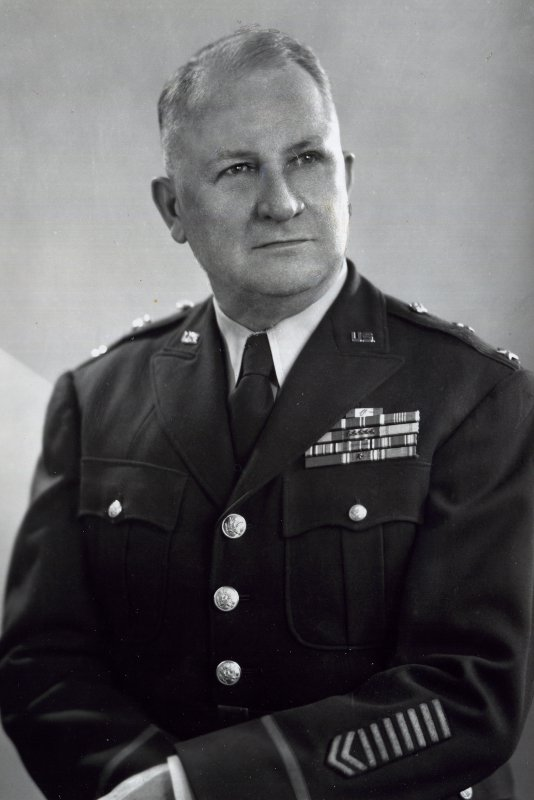
Major general William S. Key.

One of the more significant contributions was the origination of the Native American "Code Talkers." The 142nd had a company of Native Americans who spoke 26 languages and dialects. Two Native American officers were selected to supervise a communications system staffed by 18 Choctaw. The team transmitted messages relating to troop movements and their own tactical plans in their native tongue. Soldiers from other tribes, including the Cheyenne, Comanche, Cherokee, Osage and Yankton Sioux also were enlisted to communicate as code talkers. Previous to their arrival in France, the Germans had broken every American code used, resulting in the deaths of many Soldiers. However, the Germans never broke the Native Americans' "code," and these Soldiers became affectionately known as "code talkers."

Other Oklahoma units, smaller than regiment, several of which would later be combined to form today's 700th Support Battalion, the element of today's Brigade with the most combat credit, became part of the Rainbow, or 42nd Infantry Division, and conscripts went to the 90th Texas-Oklahoma Infantry Division. All three of these divisions saw combat in France.

=== Homefront between the wars ===
To replace the guardsmen on active duty, in 1918 the Second and Third Oklahoma Infantry Regiments (the future 1-179th Infantry Battalion) and a separate infantry battalion were recruited. These units later combined and constituted the Oklahoma National Guard until 1920. In 1919 these troops were sent to Drumright, Henryetta, Coalgate, and Haileyville during a labor disturbance.

In 1920, William S. Key, having attained the rank of Lieutenant Colonel, was discharged from the US Army after World War I to resume his commission in the Guard. He was appointed Captain, Field Artillery, Oklahoma Army National Guard and assigned to organize a tight artillery battery at Wewoka, Oklahoma. This horse drawn 75mm battery was federally recognized as Battery A, 1st Oklahoma Field Artillery on July 28, 1920. As white horses served as artillery animals, Battery "A" became known as the "White Horse Battery". Other artillery elements were organized in the Oklahoma National Guard, and on 18 July 1921, the 1st Oklahoma Field Artillery Regiment, consisting of a Regimental Headquarters and two firing battalions was federally recognized. In October 1921, the 1st Oklahoma Field Artillery became the 160th Field Artillery Regiment, consisting of the 1st and 2nd Battalions.

Between the World Wars the Oklahoma National Guard was frequently called to state duty. In 1921 the guardsmen were rushed to the Tulsa Race Massacre. Gov. Jack C. Walton used the troops to prevent the legislature from convening during his impeachment. Gov. William H. Murray dispatched the National Guard thirty-four times during his administration, and Gov. Ernest W. Marland used guardsmen to allow the drilling of oil wells on the Capitol grounds in Oklahoma City.

=== World War II and Korea ===
The history of the Oklahoma National Guard is largely the history of the 45th Infantry Division. The division was activated under the command of Major general William S. Key in 1940 and sent to Fort Sill, then to Camp Barkeley, Texas, where it was enlarged, then divided. The 158th Regiment and the Second Battalion of the 158th Artillery, were separated to form the 158th Regimental Combat Team (RCT), which served in the Panama Canal Zone and in the Southwest Pacific. Another battalion deployed to Alaska to help build the Alcan Highway and participate in the invasion of Okinawa, and another was posted to Asia to help construct the Burma Road. The remaining components of the 45th Division were sent to Sicily in 1943, where they fought in the campaigns of Naples-Foggia, Rome-Arno, Southern France, Rhineland, and Central Europe. After returning from Europe, the unit was deactivated on December 7, 1945.

=== The New Millennium ===
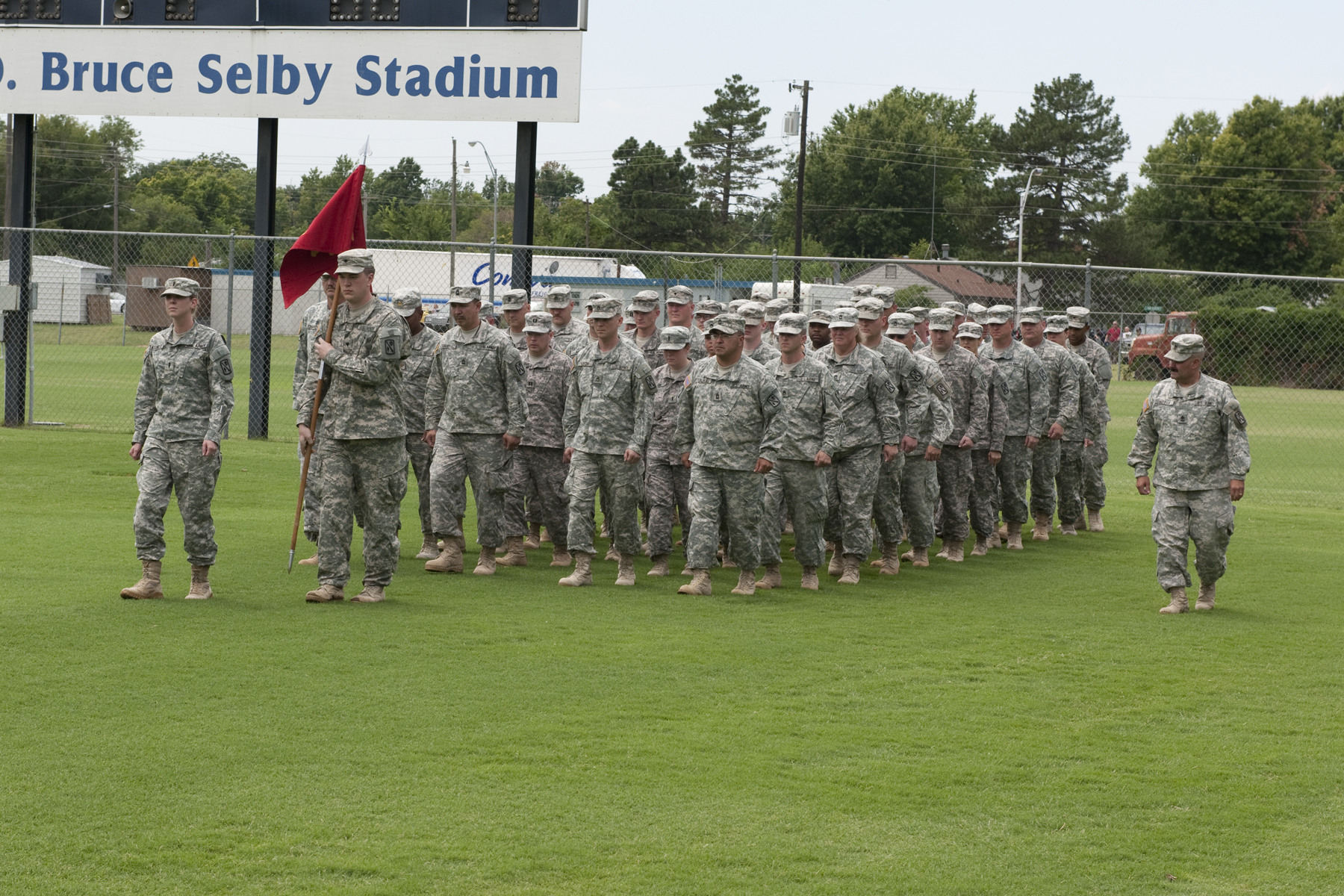
Members of Headquarters Battery, 1st Battalion, 158th Field Artillery, 45th FiRES Brigade returned to Enid, Okla., on August 11, 2009 after a year long deployment in support of Operation Iraqi Freedom.

Hurricanes Katrina and Rita struck the US Gulf Coast in September 2005. Soon after returning from Afghanistan, the 180th Infantry Regiment sent 200 soldiers to Louisiana in support of relief operations immediately following Katrina. Oklahoma's response to Katrina was so rapid and so well prepared that the commander of the Oklahoma contingent was made the commander of the 13,000 person multi state and service task force on the ground. In support of relief operations the 180th saved many lives and received numerous awards.

In late 2005 the 180th was notified of an upcoming deployment to Afghanistan in support of Task Force Phoenix V, as the security force for the Oregon Army National Guard's 41st Infantry Brigade. Companies C, D, and Headquarters Company deployed in March 2006. Members of other companies accompanied the battalion to provide needed critical skills. While in Afghanistan the 1-180th received eight Purple Hearts and several citations for valor. The 180th lost its first combat casualty in the conflict in Afghanistan when Sergeant Buddie Hughie of Poteau was killed in action while performing duties as a combat medic on 19 February 2007.

== Adjutants General of Oklahoma ==
=== Territorial government ===
| BG | Carson Jamison | December 23, 1894 | July 10, 1897 |
| BG | Phil C. Rosenbaum | July 10, 1897 | March 26, 1898 |
| BG | Bert C. Orner (acting) | March 26, 1898 | March 11, 1899 |
| BG | Harry C. Barnes | March 11, 1899 | September 4, 1901 |
| BG | E.P. Burlingame | September 4, 1901 | February 28, 1906 |
| BG | Alva J. Niles | March 1, 1906 | November 16, 1907 |

=== State government ===
- BG Frank M. Canton 17 NOV 1907 to 30 JUN 1916
- BG Ancil Earp 1 JUL 1916 to 30 JAN 1918
- BG E.P. Gipson 1 FEB 1918 to 30 JAN 1919
- MG Charles F. Barrett 1 FEB 1919 to 28 JAN 1923
- MG Baird H. Markham 28 JAN 1923 to 30 JUN 1925
- MG Charles F. Barrett 1 JUL 1925 to 19 SEP 1939
- BG Louis A. Ledbetter 20 SEP 1939 to 13 SEP 1940
- MG George A. Davis 14 SEP 1940 to 6 MAY 1947
- MG Roy W. Kenny 7 MAY 1947 to 7 MAR 1965
- MG LaVern E. Weber 8 MAR 1965 to 30 SEP 1971
- MG David C. Matthews 2 OCT 1971 to 12 JAN 1975
- MG John Coffey Jr. 13 JAN 1975 to 19 NOV 1978
- MG Robert M. Morgan 20 NOV 1978 to 11 JAN 1987
- MG Fonald F. Ferrell (ANG) 12 JAN 1987 to 13 JAN 1991
- MG Tommy G. Alsip 14 JAN 1991 to 19 JUN 1992
- MG Gary D. Maynard 20 JUN 1992 to 31 MAR 1995
- MG Stephen P. Cortright (ANG) 1 APR 1995 to 21 OCT 2002
- MG Harry M. Wyatt III (ANG) 22 OCT 2002 to 12 JAN 2003 (Acting)
- MG Harry M. Wyatt III (ANG) 13 JAN 2003 to 3 FEB 2009
- MG Myles L. Deering 3 FEB 2009 to 1 FEB 2015
- MG Robbie L. Asher 1 FEB 2015 to 7 AUG 2017
- BG Louis W. Wilham 8 AUG 2017 to 15 NOV 2017 (Interim)
- MG Michael C. Thompson 16 NOV 2017 to 10 NOV 2021

== Command Sergeants Major of Oklahoma ==
- CSM Billy J. Ferguson 1 AUG 1969 to 30 NOV 1971
- CSM John C. Marcy 1 DEC 1971 to 30 JUN 1972
- CSM William E. Nichols 31 JUL 1972 to 11 JUN 1976
- CSM Edgar A. Siewert 1 AUG 1976 to 30 OCT 1977
- CSM Sam Cluck 1 NOV 1977 to 30 JUN 1980
- CSM William G. "Bill" Evans 1 JUL 1980 to 20 AUG 1988
- CSM Carmon L. Allen 21 AUG 1988 to 9 NOV 1992
- CSM David J. Willingham 10 NOV 1992 to 30 NOC 1993
- CSM Gerald S. Plaster 1 DEC 1993 to 31 JAN 1995
- CSM Marvin L. Barbee 1 APR 1995 to 30 SEP 2002
- CSM David Keating 1 OCT 2002 to 14 NOV 2008
- CSM Stephen P. Jensen 14 NOV 2008 to 1 FEB 2015
- CSM Tony Riggs 1 FEB 2015 to Present

== Oklahoma National Guard state awards ==
- Oklahoma Distinguished Service Cross: The Oklahoma Distinguished Service Cross may be awarded to any eligible person who shall perform at great personal danger and risk of life or limb in the line of military duty any act of heroism designed to protect life or property or who while on active state duty during a period of martial law shall perform such acts over and beyond the call of duty which act, danger or risk he could have failed to perform or incur without being subject to censure for neglect of duty.
- Oklahoma Star of Valor: An Oklahoma Star of Valor Medal may be awarded to any eligible person who, while a member of the Oklahoma National Guard, performs an act of heroism involving voluntary risk of life or limb designed to protect the life of another person under conditions other than those of conflict with an armed enemy, the saving of a life or the success of the act not being essential.
- Oklahoma Distinguished Service Medal: The Oklahoma Distinguished Service Medal may be awarded to any eligible person who, as a member of the Oklahoma National Guard, shall perform unusually distinguished and meritorious service which to a marked degree is reflected in the increased efficiency and growth of the Oklahoma National Guard or which brings exceptional honor and credit to the Oklahoma National Guard and commands the attention and respect of the citizens of the state and of members of the military establishment of the United States.
- Oklahoma Meritorious Service Medal: The Oklahoma Meritorious Service Medal may be awarded to any eligible person who, while as a member of the Oklahoma National Guard, shall perform outstanding meritorious service which to a marked degree is reflected in the increased efficiency and growth of that branch of the Oklahoma National Guard to which he belongs or which brings credit to the Oklahoma National Guard over and above that which would occur by reason of the superior performance of assigned duties.
- Oklahoma Commendation Medal: The Oklahoma Commendation Medal may be awarded to any eligible person who, as a member of the Oklahoma National Guard, influenced the success and recognition of that branch of the Oklahoma National Guard to which he belongs through performance of conspicuous military duty, distinct achievement, or an act of courage.
- Oklahoma Exceptional Service Medal: The Oklahoma Exceptional Service Medal may be awarded to a present or former employee of the Oklahoma Military Department who has contributed to the efficiency and improvement of the Oklahoma National Guard through sustained loyal and dedicated service, demonstration of outstanding ability, or a specific noteworthy accomplishment, with subsequent awards being denoted by numeral devices affixed thereto.
- Oklahoma Guardsman Medal: The Oklahoma Guardsman Medal may be awarded to any eligible person who, as a member of the National Guard having more than fifteen (15) years total service, has contributed to the efficiency and growth of the Oklahoma National Guard by an unusually high character of performance of duty and, by the contribution of extra time and effort, has made himself known as an outstanding member of the Oklahoma National Guard.
- Oklahoma Senior Enlisted Leadership Ribbon: The Oklahoma Senior Enlisted Leadership Ribbon recognizes Oklahoma National Guard senior enlisted Soldiers and Airmen who have served or are serving in First Sergeant (1SG) or Command Sergeant Major (CSM)/Command Chief Master Sergeant (CCM) positions.
- Oklahoma Desert Storm Service Medal: The Oklahoma Desert Storm Service Medal and Ribbon may be awarded to any member of the Oklahoma National Guard who was called into active federal service during the Persian Gulf Crisis.
- Oklahoma Selective Reserve Medal: Selected Reserve Force Medal may be awarded to any individual who served honorably as a member of an Oklahoma National Guard unit designated as a Selected Reserve Force (SRF) by the Department of the Army.
- Oklahoma Alfred P. Murrah Service Medal (Oklahoma Bombing): The Oklahoma Alfred P. Murrah Service Medal may be awarded to any member of the Oklahoma National Guard, to nonuniformed employees of the Oklahoma Military Department and to other persons deemed appropriate by the Adjutant General who served in support of disaster relief operations in Oklahoma City, Oklahoma, following the April 19, 1995, bombing of the Alfred P. Murrah Federal Building.
- Oklahoma Recruiting Ribbon: At the discretion of the Adjutant General, an Oklahoma Recruiting Medal may be awarded to any member of the Oklahoma National Guard who, in any one calendar year, is personally and solely responsible for obtaining five (5) accessions to the strength of the Oklahoma National Guard.
- Oklahoma Active Duty Service Medal: Oklahoma Active Duty Service Medal may be awarded to any eligible person who was a member of the Oklahoma National Guard on state active duty for state disaster or civil disturbance for a period of time of not less than twenty-four (24) hours and who has contributed to the success and recognition of his/her unit during their state mission, with subsequent awards being denoted by numeral devices affixed thereto.
- Oklahoma Military Funeral Honors Ribbon: This ribbon will recognize Oklahoma National Guard Soldiers and Airmen that are responsible for conducting Military Funeral Honors.
- Oklahoma Long Service Ribbon 5 years: The Long Service Medal shall be awarded for honest and faithful service in the Oklahoma National Guard for a period of five (5) years.
- Oklahoma Long Service Ribbon 10 years: The Long Service Medal shall be awarded for honest and faithful service in the Oklahoma National Guard for a period of ten (10) years.
- Oklahoma Long Service Ribbon 15 years: The Long Service Medal shall be awarded for honest and faithful service in the Oklahoma National Guard for a period of fifteen (15) years.
- Oklahoma Long Service Ribbon 20 years: The Long Service Medal shall be awarded for honest and faithful service in the Oklahoma National Guard for a period of twenty (20) years.
- Oklahoma Long Service Ribbon 25 years: The Long Service Medal shall be awarded for honest and faithful service in the Oklahoma National Guard for a period of twenty-five (25) years.
- Oklahoma Long Service Ribbon 30 years: The Long Service Medal shall be awarded for honest and faithful service in the Oklahoma National Guard for a period of thirty (30) years.
- Oklahoma Long Service Ribbon 35 years: The Long Service Medal shall be awarded for honest and faithful service in the Oklahoma National Guard for a period of thirty-five (35) years.
- Oklahoma Good Conduct Ribbon: An Oklahoma Good Conduct Ribbon may be awarded to any member of the Oklahoma National Guard for exemplary behavior, efficiency, and fidelity while performing a continuous year of military service in an enlisted status, subsequent to enactment.
- Oklahoma Governor's Distinguished Unit Award: The Governor's Distinguished Unit Award shall be awarded annually to the outstanding Army and Air National Guard unit, selected by committees appointed by the Adjutant General, such units to be presented the Governor's Trophy, Army, and the Governor's Trophy, Air, respectively. This award is not being issued as criteria are out of date.
- Oklahoma Commander's Trophy Award Ribbon The Commander's Trophy Ribbon is awarded for outstanding performance based on the previous calendar year, related to flying safety records, aircrews and aircraft operationally-ready and utilization rates. Any Oklahoma Air National Guard operational flying squadron is eligible.
