= Stephen Cortright =

American lawyer

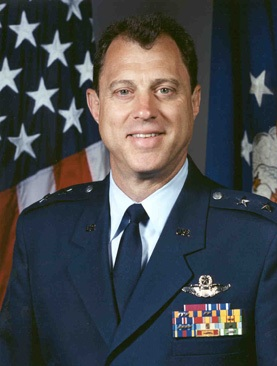
- Major General Stephen Cortright, USAF (ret.); Former Adjutant General, State of Oklahoma
- Born: March 26, 1941 (age 85)
- Military career
- Allegiance: United States of America
- Branch: United States Air Force; Oklahoma National Guard; Oklahoma Air National Guard
- Service years: 1964–2003
- Rank: Major general
- Commands: Adjutant General of Oklahoma
- Awards: Legion of Merit

Major General Stephen Phelps Cortright USAF (retired) (born March 26, 1941), is an American military officer and attorney from Oklahoma who served as the 17th Adjutant General of Oklahoma under Governor Frank Keating from 1995 to 2003. Concurrent with his service as adjutant general, Cortright served in Keating's cabinet as the Oklahoma Secretary of the Military.

== Education ==
Cortright received his bachelor's degree from Oklahoma State University in 1964 and earned his juris doctor from the University of Tulsa in 1973.

== Military career ==
Cortright joined the United States Air Force on February 14, 1964. On May 12, 1964, he was commissioned as a second lieutenant and entered undergraduate pilot training at Webb Air Force Base in Texas. He is a command pilot with over 5000 hours of military flying time in the T-33, T-37, T-38, RF-4C, F-100, A-7, and F-16 aircraft. He flew 217 combat missions while serving in Vietnam from September 1966 through July 1967.

Following the end of the Vietnam War, Cortright returned to Oklahoma and became the operations officers with the 125th Tactical Fighter Squadron in Tulsa, Oklahoma. He later became the squadron's commander. He then served as the commander of the 138th Tactical Fighter Group, also based in Tulsa. From 1988 to 1992, Cortight was appointed the headquarters commander of the Oklahoma Air National Guard. In 1992, he served as the Air National Guard Assistant to the commander, Pacific Air Forces at Hickam Air Force Base in Hawaii.

=== Dates of ranks ===
Promotions
Insignia	Rank	Date
	Major general	October 6, 1992
	Brigadier general	March 1, 1989
	Colonel	June 26, 1984
	Lieutenant colonel	July 20, 1979
	Major	July 3, 1975
	Captain	May 12, 1969
	First lieutenant	May 12, 1967
	Second lieutenant	May 12, 1964

== Keating administration ==
In 1995, Governor of Oklahoma Frank Keating appointed Cortright to serve as the Adjutant General of Oklahoma, succeeding Gary Maynard. As adjutant general, General Cortright was the highest-ranking military official in Oklahoma, ranking only behind Governor Keating in his role as commander-in-chief. Cortright oversaw the Oklahoma Military Department and the Oklahoma National Guard. Cortright remained in that position until the end of Keating's term in 2003. He was succeeded by Air Force general Harry M. Wyatt III.

== Personal life ==
Cortright was married to his wife, Barbara Joyce (née Coleman). She was born in Tulsa February 22, 1943. Stephen and Barbara had four children, David, Tiffany, Heather and Adam, who all survive her. Barbara died on March 27, 2016, in Tulsa. Her ashes were placed at Fort Gibson National Cemetery, after a memorial service at Yale Avenue Christian Church in Tulsa.

Political offices
Preceded by	Oklahoma Secretary of the Military; Under Governor Frank Keating; 1995 - 2003	Succeeded by Harry M. Wyatt III
Military offices
Preceded by Gary Maynard	Adjutant General of Oklahoma; Under Governor Frank Keating; 1995 - 2003	Succeeded by Harry M. Wyatt III
