= State adjutant general =

Head of a state National Guard

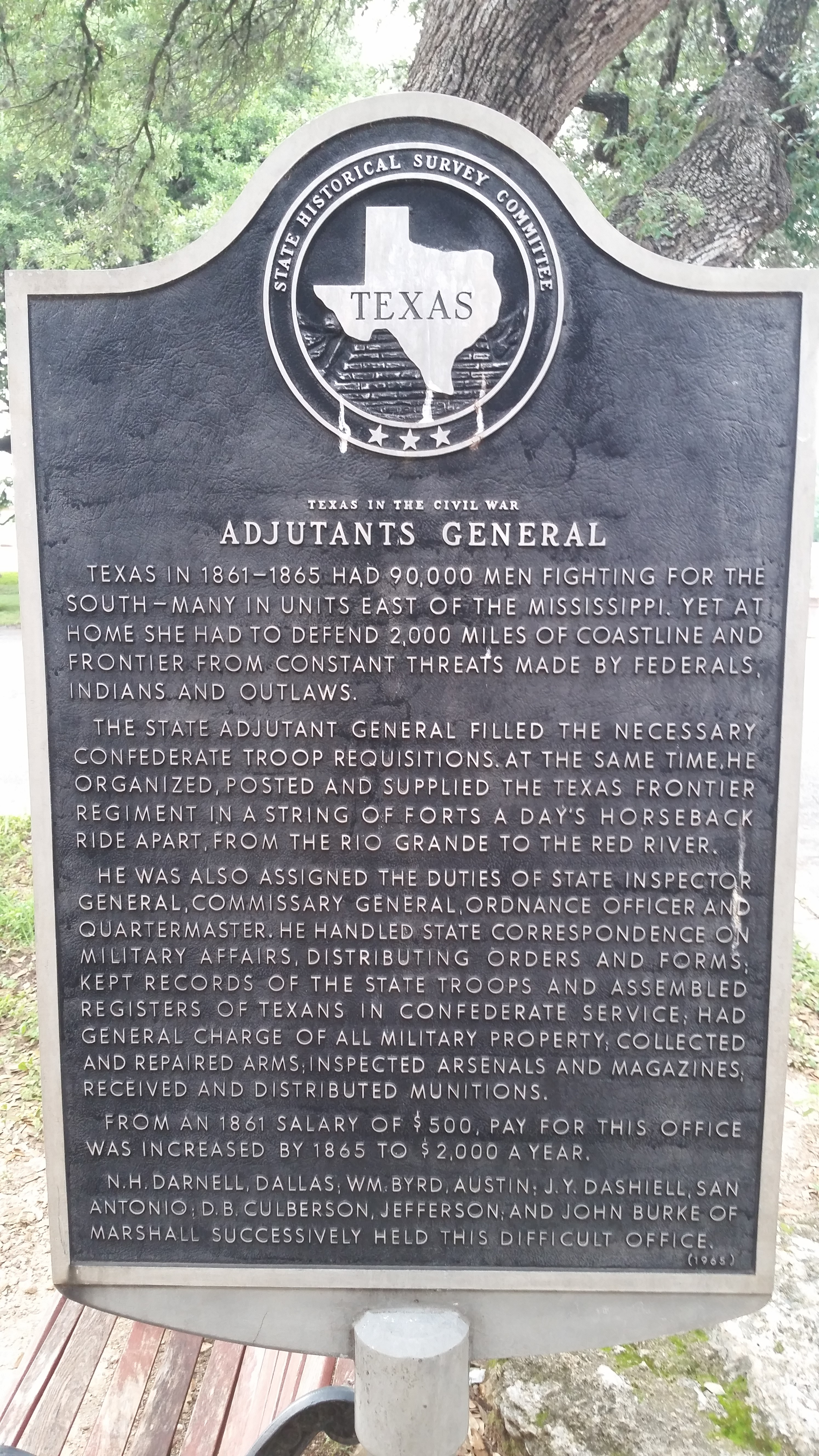
State Adjutant General Texas historical marker in Camp Mabry

Each state in the United States has a senior military officer, as the state adjutant general, who is the de facto commander of a state's military forces, including the National Guard residing within the state, the state's naval militia, and any state defense forces. This officer is known as TAG (The Adjutant General), and is subordinated to the chief executive (generally the state's governor). They do not have authority over police forces, only military forces.

== Source of appointment ==
In 49 states, Puerto Rico, Guam, and the United States Virgin Islands, the adjutant general is appointed by the governor. The exceptions are Vermont, where the adjutant general is appointed by a vote of the Vermont General Assembly, and the District of Columbia, where a commanding general is appointed by the president of the United States. Until 2016, South Carolina chose its adjutant general in statewide general elections, but after passage of a popular referendum, the holder of this position is now appointed by the governor.

== Responsibilities ==
Each adjutant general shares a common responsibility for the state's National Guard plus a unique set of other responsibilities defined by the state's constitution, state statutes, and other state-level directives. In addition to their state responsibilities, each TAG is responsible to the federal government for the use and care of federal assets under the state's control. The National Guard Bureau (NGB) in the Department of Defense provides a centralized administrative, funding, and procurement process to support the states' military departments. The chief of the National Guard Bureau also provides input as a member of the Joint Chiefs of Staff on national military activities as they relate to the National Guard.

The 54 adjutants general collectively form the Adjutants General Association of the United States (AGAUS) which strives to enhance both state and national military security. A professional military guard organization, the National Guard Association of the United States serves to lobby both Congress and the Executive branch about common needs of the Guard as a whole and also provide support to members of the National Guard.

=== National Guard ===
Each adjutant general commands their state's Army and Air National Guard units which are not on federal active duty. When a National Guard unit is federalized it is moved from state command to the Department of Defense and placed under an Army or Air Force command.

=== State defense forces ===
Twenty-three adjutants general have responsibility for military land forces that comprise state level militias under the command of the various governors and generally have state support missions. Eight of which maintain a naval militia division. Three adjutants general - California, Puerto Rico, and Texas - are also responsible for an air support component.

=== Emergency management agencies ===
Some adjutant generals are responsible for oversight of the state's emergency management organization. These groups are non-military organizations but have a close working relationship with the state's National Guard and any state defense forces. They are the state level agency that works directly with the Federal Emergency Management Agency in preparing for, responding to, and recovering from disasters.

=== Homeland security ===
Some states have assigned their adjutant general the responsibility for overseeing homeland security. In other states, this responsibility may be assigned to the state's law enforcement agency instead.

=== Veteran’s affairs ===
Some states place their veteran's affairs organization in the state's military department under the oversight of the state adjutant general. Other states have an independent veteran's affairs department.

== List of adjutants general ==
Each adjutant general is the senior officer in the state's military structure. Many hold federal rank as active duty general officers, but others may for a variety of reasons, including mandatory federal military retirement age, only hold general officer rank from their state.

Title	Adjutant General	State, district, or insular area	Rank	Svc	Assumed office	Appointed by
The Adjutant General of Alabama	David K. Pritchett	Alabama	Major General	ARNG	2024	Governor
The Adjutant General of Alaska	Torrence Saxe	Alaska	Lieutenant General (AK)	ANG	2019	Governor
The Adjutant General of Arizona	John A. Conley	Arizona	Brigadier General	ANG	2025	Governor
The Adjutant General of Arkansas	Chad Bridges	Arkansas	Brigadier General (AR)	ARNG	2024	Governor
The Adjutant General of California	Matthew P. Beevers	California	Major General	ARNG	2023	Governor
The Adjutant General of Colorado	Robert Davis	Colorado	Major General	ARNG	2025	Governor
The Adjutant General of Connecticut	Francis J. Evon Jr.	Connecticut	Major General	ARNG	2018	Governor
The Adjutant General of Delaware	James A. Benson	Delaware	Brigadier General	ARNG	2025	Governor
The Commanding General, District of Columbia National Guard	Leland L. Blanchard II	District of Columbia	Major General	ARNG	2025	President
The Adjutant General of the District of Columbia National Guard	Vacant	District of Columbia				President
The Adjutant General of Florida	John D. Haas	Florida	Major General	ARNG	2023	Governor
The Adjutant General of Georgia	Richard D. Wilson	Georgia	Major General	ARNG	2024	Governor
The Adjutant General of Guam	Karin L. Watson	Guam	Brigadier General	ARNG	2025	Governor
The Adjutant General of Hawaii	Stephen F. Logan	Hawaii	Major General	ARNG	2024	Governor
The Adjutant General of Idaho	Timothy J. Donnellan	Idaho	Major General	ANG	2024	Governor
The Adjutant General of Illinois	Rodney C. Boyd	Illinois	Major General	ARNG	2024	Governor
The Adjutant General of Indiana	Lawrence M. Muennich	Indiana	Major General (IN)	ARNG	2025	Governor
The Adjutant General of Iowa	Stephen E. Osborn	Iowa	Major General	ARNG	2023	Governor
The Adjutant General of Kansas	Paul W. Schneider	Kansas	Brigadier General	ARNG	2026	Governor
The Adjutant General of Kentucky	Haldane B. Lamberton	Kentucky	Major General	ARNG	2019	Governor
The Adjutant General of Louisiana	Thomas C. Friloux	Louisiana	Major General	ARNG	2024	Governor
The Adjutant General of Maine	Diane L. Dunn	Maine	Major General	ARNG	2024	Governor
The Adjutant General of Maryland	Janeen L. Birckhead	Maryland	Major General	ARNG	2023	Governor
The Adjutant General of Massachusetts	Gary W. Keefe	Massachusetts	Major General	ANG	2016	Governor
The Adjutant General of Michigan	Paul D. Rogers	Michigan	Major General	ARNG	2019	Governor
The Adjutant General of Minnesota	Shawn P. Manke	Minnesota	Major General	ARNG	2020	Governor
The Adjutant General of Mississippi	Bobby M. Ginn Jr.	Mississippi	Major General (MS)	ARNG	2024	Governor
The Adjutant General of Missouri	Charles D. Hausman	Missouri	Major General	ARNG	2025	Governor
The Adjutant General of Montana	Trenton J. Gibson	Montana	Brigadier General	ARNG	2025	Governor
The Adjutant General of Nebraska	Craig W. Strong	Nebraska	Major General	ANG	2023	Governor
The Adjutant General of Nevada	D. Rodger Waters	Nevada	Major General	ARNG	2024	Governor
The Adjutant General of New Hampshire	David J. Mikolaities	New Hampshire	Major General	ARNG	2017	Governor
The Adjutant General of New Jersey	Yvonne Mays	New Jersey	Brigadier General	ARNG	2024	Governor
The Adjutant General of New Mexico	Miguel Aguilar	New Mexico	Major General	ARNG	2021	Governor
The Adjutant General of New York	Raymond F. Shields Jr.	New York	Major General	ARNG	2018	Governor
The Adjutant General of North Carolina	M. Todd Hunt	North Carolina	Major General	ARNG	2019	Governor
The Adjutant General of North Dakota	Mitchell R. Johnson	North Dakota	Brigadier General	ANG	2024	Governor
The Adjutant General of Ohio	Matthew S. Woodruff	Ohio	Major General	ARNG	2025	Governor
The Adjutant General of Oklahoma	Thomas H. Mancino	Oklahoma	Major General	ARNG	2021	Governor
The Adjutant General of Oregon	Alan Gronewold	Oregon	Brigadier General	ARNG	2023	Governor
The Adjutant General of Pennsylvania	John R. Pippy	Pennsylvania	Major General	ARNG	2024	Governor
The Adjutant General of Puerto Rico	Carlos J. Rivera Román	Puerto Rico	Brigadier General (PR)	ARNG	2025	Governor
The Adjutant General of Rhode Island	Andrew J. Chevalier	Rhode Island	Major General	ARNG	2025	Governor
The Adjutant General of South Carolina	Robin B. Stilwell	South Carolina	Brigadier General	ARNG	2025	Governor
The Adjutant General of South Dakota	Mark R. Morrell	South Dakota	Major General	ARNG	2023	Governor
The Adjutant General of Tennessee	Warner A. Ross II	Tennessee	Major General	ARNG	2019	Governor
The Adjutant General of Texas	Thomas M. Suelzer	Texas	Major General	ANG	2022	Governor
The Adjutant General of Utah	Michael D. Kjar	Utah	Brigadier General	ARNG	2026	Governor
The Adjutant General of Vermont	Henry U. Harder	Vermont	Major General	ANG	2026	Legislature
The Adjutant General of the U.S. Virgin Islands	Kodjo S. Knox-Limbacker	U.S. Virgin Islands	Major General	ARNG	2019	Governor
The Adjutant General of Virginia	James W. Ring	Virginia	Major General	ARNG	2023	Governor
The Adjutant General of Washington	Gent Welsh Jr.	Washington	Major General	ANG	2024	Governor
The Adjutant General of West Virginia	James D. Seward	West Virginia	Brigadier General	ARNG	2025	Governor
The Adjutant General of Wisconsin	Matthew J. Strub	Wisconsin	Major General	ARNG	2025	Governor
The Adjutant General of Wyoming	Gregory C. Porter	Wyoming	Major General	ARNG	2019	Governor

== See also ==
- List of current United States National Guard major generals
