= Oklahoma State Guard =

- Country: United States
- Allegiance: Oklahoma
- Type: State defense force
- Role: Military reserve force

Commanders
- Civilian leadership: Governor of Oklahoma

The Oklahoma State Guard is the inactive state defense force of Oklahoma. If activated, the mission of the Oklahoma State Guard is to augment, assist and support the Oklahoma National Guard and the civil authorities in Oklahoma. The State Guard is under the command of the governor of Oklahoma, as the Commander-in-Chief, and the Adjutant General of Oklahoma as the commanding officer. Created by Oklahoma State Guard Act of 1941, the Oklahoma State Guard cannot be federalized and cannot be deployed outside Oklahoma. It is under the administrative command of the Oklahoma Department of the Military.

The Oklahoma State Guard is authorized by Title 44 Oklahoma Statutes, Sections 241-248.

== History ==
=== 1990s ===
The Oklahoma State Guard was briefly activated in the early 1990s by Governor David Walters. Walters appointed Jode Wilson, a retired Army colonel in his late 60s, to head the State Guard in 1991. Wilson resigned after a grand jury investigation into Walters during his first term and the guard was disbanded.

=== 21st century ===
In January 2022, Republican State Senator Nathan Dahm introduced legislation to reactivate the Oklahoma State Guard. The bill failed in the Republican led Oklahoma Senate Veterans Committee in February.

In 2025, Governor Kevin Stitt announced his desire to reestablish the Oklahoma State Guard.
