= Ennis H. Gipson =

American politician

Ennis Hubert Gipson

Member of the Texas House of Representatives
- In office 1923–1925
- Constituency: Wichita Falls

Adjutant General of Oklahoma
- In office February 1, 1918 – January 30, 1919
- Preceded by: Ancel S. Earp
- Succeeded by: Charles F. Barrett

Personal details
- Born: July 17, 1879 Chariton, Missouri, U.S.
- Died: December 3, 1943 (aged 64) Beckham County, Oklahoma, U.S.
- Party: Democratic Party

Ennis Hubert Gipson was an American politician who served as the 3rd Adjutant General of Oklahoma between 1918 and 1919 and as a member of the Texas House of Representatives between 1923 and 1925.

== Biography ==
Ennis Hubert Gipson was born July 17, 1879, in Chariton, Missouri. He served as the Adjutant General of Oklahoma between 1918 and 1919. He was a lawyer, member of the Democratic Party, and served in the Texas House of Representatives representing Wichita Falls between 1923 and 1925. He died December 3, 1943, in Beckham County, Oklahoma.
