= Charles F. Barrett =

American journalist, soldier, and politician

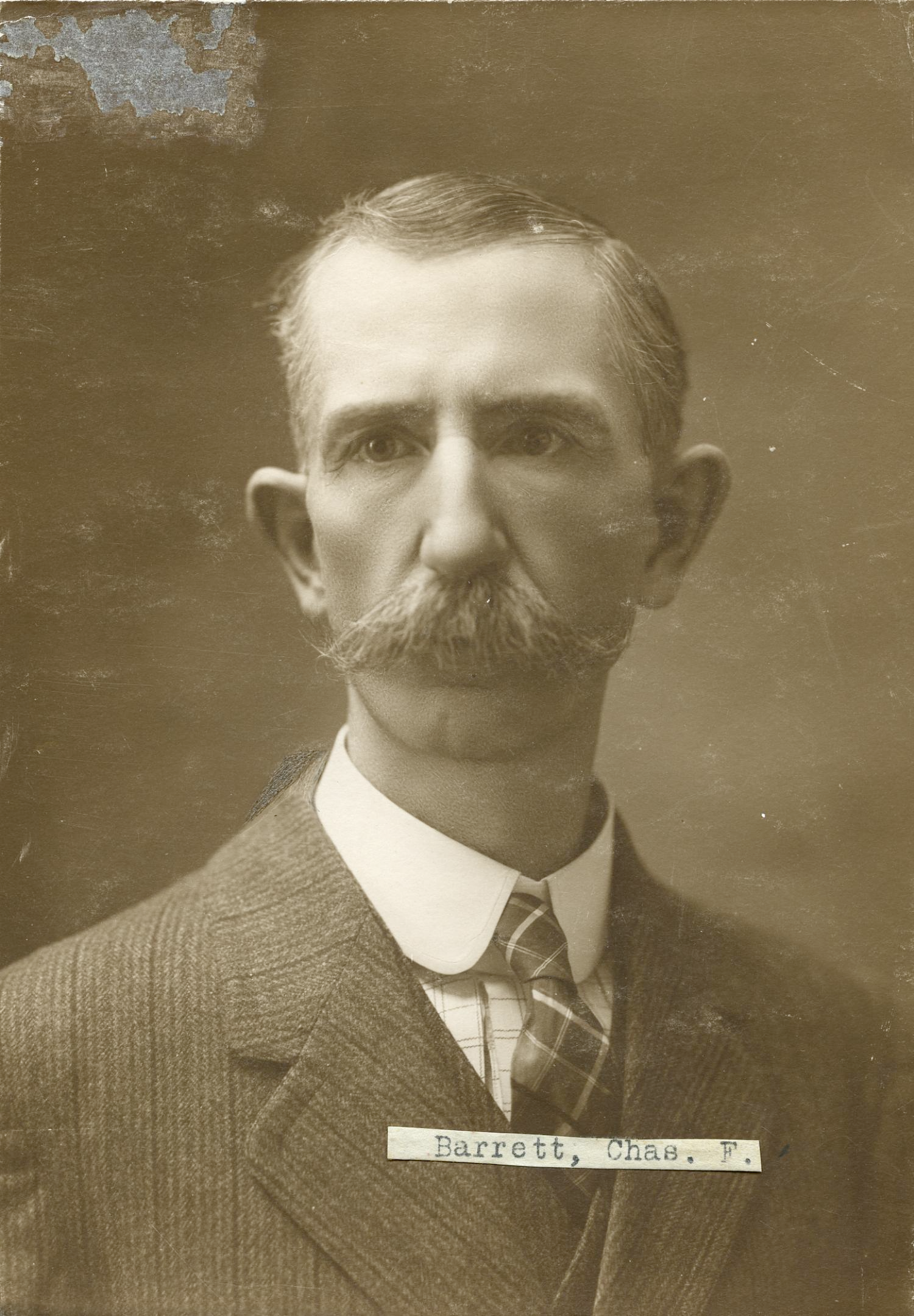
- Charles Barrett in 1910

4th and 6th Adjutant General of Oklahoma
- In office July 1, 1925 – September 19, 1939
- Preceded by: Baird H. Markham
- Succeeded by: Louis A. Ledbetter
- In office February 1, 1919 – January 28, 1923
- Preceded by: Ennis H. Gipson
- Succeeded by: Baird H. Markham

Member of the Oklahoma Senate from the 13th district
- In office 1912–1916
- Preceded by: Michael Eggerman
- Succeeded by: T.B. Hogg

Member of the Oklahoma House of Representatives from the Pottawatomie district
- In office 1910–1912
- Preceded by: Milton Bryan
- Succeeded by: James T. Farrall

Personal details
- Born: January 1, 1861 Galion, Ohio, US
- Died: February 11, 1946 (aged 85) Albuquerque, New Mexico, US
- Resting place: Fairlawn Cemetery, Oklahoma City
- Party: Democratic Party

Charles F. Barrett (January 1, 1861 – February 11, 1946) was an American journalist, soldier, and politician from the U.S. state of Oklahoma who served as the 4th and 6th Adjutant General of Oklahoma between 1919-1923 and 1925–1939. He led National Guard response to the Tulsa race massacre.

== Early life and career ==
Charles F. Barrett was born on January 1, 1861, in Galion, Ohio, to John E. Barrett and Charlotte Reynolds. He lived in Kansas, Colorado, Utah, and Montana before setting in Oklahoma City on July 4, 1893. He was the managing editor of the Press-Gazette and founded the Earlsboro Border Signal.

== Military career ==
Barrett served in the Oklahoma Territory militia as a captain enlisting in 1896 before the Spanish-American War, but did not see combat due to an injury. He continued to serve in the Oklahoma National Guard (or its predecessors) until 1939. In 1914, he became a judge advocate and in 1919 he was appointed as the Adjutant General of Oklahoma to reorganize the guard for World War I. He served in that position until 1939, excluding a two-year period in 1923–1925. He is known as the "Father of the Forty-Fifth Infantry Division.

In 1921, Barrett was responsible for deploying troops in response to the Tulsa Race Massacre. When he arrived in Tulsa, he was required to report to local authorities, but could not find them delaying his response by three hours.

== Death and legacy ==
Barrett was inducted into the Oklahoma Hall of Fame in 1931. He died in Albuquerque, New Mexico, on February 11, 1946, and was buried at Fairlawn Cemetery in Oklahoma City.
