= Ancel S. Earp =

2nd Adjutant General of Oklahoma
- In office July 1, 1916 – January 30, 1918
- Appointed by: Robert L. Williams
- Preceded by: Frank M. Canton
- Succeeded by: Ennis H. Gipson

Personal details
- Born: April 14, 1893 McLennan County, Texas, U.S.
- Died: May 25, 1976 (aged 83) Oklahoma City, Oklahoma, U.S.

Ancel S. Earp was an American businessman who served as the 2nd Adjutant General of Oklahoma.

== Biography ==
Ancel Earp was born on April 14, 1893, in McLennan County, Texas, to S. N. Earp and Nina Elouise Jones. He moved with his family to Oklahoma Territory in 1897. He graduated from Ardmore Public Schools, and clerked for Judges Robert L. Williams. He would later work as the treasurer for Williams campaign for governor, as his chief clerk after his election, and later as the appointed Adjutant General of Oklahoma. He served in France during World War I and returned to Oklahoma City after the war to start an insurance company. He married Lillian Mary Tidnam and the couple had two children. He died on May 25, 1976, in Oklahoma City.
