= Oklahoma Military Department =

- Great Seal of Oklahoma

Agency overview
- Formed: May 16, 1951
- Headquarters: 3501 Military Circle Oklahoma City, Oklahoma
- Employees: 443 civilian 9,955 military
- Annual budget: $11.7 million
- Minister responsible: John Nash, Secretary of the Military
- Agency executives: MG Thomas H. Mancino, Adjutant General; Brig Gen Raymond H. Siegfried III, Assistant Adjutant General for Air Guard; BG Jon M. Harrison, Assistant Adjutant General for Army Guard
- Child agency: Oklahoma National Guard
- Website: https://oklahoma.gov/top/agency/025.html

The Oklahoma Military Department is an agency of the state of Oklahoma that serves as the administrative agency for all matters concerning the Oklahoma National Guard. Under the authority and direction of the Governor of Oklahoma as commander-in-chief, the agency is responsible for planning, establishing, and enforcing rules and procedures governing the administration, supply, and training of the Oklahoma National Guard, when not in the active service of the United States, and the Oklahoma State Guard. The Oklahoma Unorganized Militia, those citizens of the United States between 17-70 in Oklahoma, only exists in statute, and is not a "state military force," according to Oklahoma Code. The department also maintains all state-owned, licensed or leased facilities, including Camp Gruber.

The Adjutant General of Oklahoma, appointed by the Governor with the advice and consent of the Oklahoma Senate, serves as the administrative director of the Military Department and is the military commanding officer of the Oklahoma National Guard.

== History ==
The Military Department traces its history to 1890 when the United States Congress authorized one regiment of organized militia for Oklahoma Territory. Following that authorization, the Territorial Legislature passed a law in 1895 which provided for the organization and development of the Volunteer Militia, which later became the Oklahoma National Guard.

The Oklahoma Military Department was established in 1951 and serves as the administrative agency for all matters concerning the Oklahoma National Guard and other military organizations of the State government.

== Leadership ==
The Governor of Oklahoma is the commander-in-chief of all Oklahoma military organizations, making the Governor the chief officer of the Military Department. The Adjutant General of Oklahoma, appointed by the Governor with the advice and consent of the Oklahoma Senate, serves as the administrative head of the Military Department and is the military commanding officer of all Oklahoma military organizations, second only to the Governor. While serving as Adjutant General, the individual holding the office holds the rank of Major General.

In February 2015, Major General Myles Deering was succeeded as Adjutant General by Major General Robbie L. Asher. The current state adjutant general of Oklahoma is Major General Thomas H. Mancino. Mancino was appointed by Governor Kevin Stitt on November 10, 2021.

== Organization ==
=== Army and Air Divisions ===
To assist him in running the Military Department, the Adjutant General appoints an Assistant Adjutant General for Army and an Assistant Adjutant General for Air, to oversee the Oklahoma Army National Guard and the Oklahoma Air National Guard respectively. Both Assistant Adjutants General have operational command over their units and both hold the rank of Brigadier General.

=== Joint Staff ===
The Joint Staff assists the Adjutant General in the decision making and execution process of the Military Department. The Joint Staff does not have operational command over any units of the Military Department. The sole function of the Joint Staff is command support, and its only authority is that which is delegated to it by the Adjutant General. The Joint Staff assists the Adjutant General in accomplishing his responsibilities for strategic direction of the department, ensuring operation of all units under unified command, and their integration into land and air forces. The Joint Staff is composed of both Army and Air National Guard personnel.

The head of the Joint Staff is the Chief of the Joint Staff appointed by the Adjutant General, who has the rank of Brigadier General

The Joint Staff is composed of the following directorates:

- J-1: Manpower and Personnel Directorate - The J-1 provides personnel actions training, support and evaluation to all personnel, participates in contingency planning and mobilization and deployment preparation to provide military support to meet Federal, State and Community missions. Assess, evaluate and monitor the status of personnel readiness of National Guard units and implement programs and procedures to meet personnel readiness requirements.
- J-3: Operations and Training Directorate - The J-3 is responsible for assisting the Command Group in the direction and control of all operations through planning, coordinating, information sharing and integrating all aspects of operations. These operations include training, force integration, readiness, mobilization, and domestic operations including congressionally mandated programs: the Counter Drug Program and the Weapons of Mass Destruction - Civil Support Team Program.
- J-4: Logistics Directorate - The J-4 serves as the primary advisor to the Army Guard for all logistics matters to include: supply, maintenance, transportation, acquisition logistics, installation/facility and environmental issues. The mission of the J-4 is to participate in joint matters at the strategic level with the United States Secretary of Defense, Joint Chiefs of Staff, other Defense agencies and the Unified Combatant Commands in support of the National Security Strategy, the national Homeland Security Strategy, and other United States Department of Defense strategies, guidance, directives, deliberate and crisis action plans and contingency operations.
- J-5/7: Strategic Plans and Policy Directorate - The J-5 plans, conducts and facilitates strategic planning for the department and is responsible for the State Partnership Program as well as providing staff coordination and administration of activities and programs which integrate military and non-military agencies and international programs. The J7 serves as the primary staff directorate for developing and documenting joint training plans, joint training and joint exercises.
- J-6: Command, Control, Communications & Computers Directorate - The J-6 provides Information Technology Services to the personnel of the department.
- J-8: Force Structure, Resources and Assessment - The J-8 is responsible for resource oversight, guidance, policy, procedures, and assessments
- Joint Chaplaincy - under the direction of the State Chaplain, the Joint Chaplaincy provides religious support to personnel across the full spectrum of operations. Ministry Teams assist commanders in ensuring the right of free exercise of religion, and provide spiritual, moral and ethical leadership to the department.
- Office of the State Judge Advocate General - composed of Army lawyers, legal administrators, and specialists, is responsible for assisting commanders with Operational Law, Civil Law, and Military Justice
- Public Affairs Office - provides public information to the public and the media

== Component Units ==
- Joint Staff
- Oklahoma National Guard
  - Oklahoma Army National Guard
    - Camp Gruber Training Center
    - 90th Troop Command
    - 45th Infantry Brigade Combat Team
    - 45th Fires Brigade
    - 189th Regiment
    - 63rd WMD Civil Support Team
  - Oklahoma Air National Guard
    - 137th Air Refueling Wing
    - 138th Fighter Wing
- Oklahoma State Guard

== Budget ==
The annual budget of the Military Department is divided into two primary sources: yearly appropriations from the Oklahoma Legislature ($11.7 million) and federal funding made available thought the Master Cooperative Agreement.

Expenditures for the department are dedicated towards salaries for personnel and operating expenses in support of OMD managed facilities in support of the State Guard.

== See also ==
- United States National Guard
- State adjutant general
