= Fannie Birckhead =

U.S. community organizer, judge, and politician (1935–2022)

- Born: Fannie Mae Ward; February 28, 1935; Worcester County, Maryland, U.S.
- Died: February 9, 2022 (aged 86)
- Education: Maryland State College; University of Maryland, College Park; Apex Beauty School of Cosmetology; Wor–Wic Community College
- Occupations: community organizer, politician, judge
- Political party: Democratic
- Children: 3; including Janeen L. Birckhead

Fannie Mae Ward Birckhead (née Ward; February 28, 1935 – February 9, 2022) was a U.S. community organizer, judge, and politician. In the 1980s and 1990s, she was a plaintiff who successfully challenged the discriminatory election systems of Snow Hill, Maryland and Worcester County, Maryland. In 1987, she became the first African-American town councillor in Snow Hill. In 1998, she became the first Black woman to serve as mayor on the Eastern Shore of Maryland (interim mayor, not elected). From 1998 to 2002, she served as a judge on the orphans' court of Worcester County, the first Black person to do so.

== Early life and education ==
Birckhead was born on February 28, 1935, to Beatrice Geneva (née Drummond) and Frank James Ward Sr. She attended public schools in Worcester County, Maryland. She completed training at the Maryland State College and University of Maryland, College Park. She also attended the Apex Beauty School of Cosmetology in Philadelphia. She completed a certificate in geriatric nursing from Wor–Wic Community College.

== Career ==
Birckhead served as a poll watcher and later became a community organizer for voter registration. In 1985, Birckhead and James Lee Purnell Jr. were among the seven plaintiffs who, with the support of the American Civil Liberties Union (ACLU) filed a lawsuit against the town of Snow Hill, Maryland which had disenfranchised its Black constituents. The trial was ruled by Joseph H. Young. Snow Hill established three districts, including the Western district which had a 74 percent Black majority. In May 1987, Brickhead was elected to the Western district, becoming the first African American to be elected to the town council. She also served as the council's secretary. Brickhead was reelected six times until 1997. In the 1990s, Birckhead was one of five plaintiffs who filed a successful lawsuit with the ACLU of Maryland against Worcester County's election system. She was the only woman plaintiff. In the late 1990s, she was the commissioner campaign treasurer for Edward Lee.

After Craig Johnson's removal from office in 1998, councillor Birckhead briefly served as interim mayor of Snow Hill. This made her the first Black women mayor on the Eastern Shore of Maryland. Later that year, Birckhead, a Democrat, was elected to the orphans' court of Worcester County. She was the first Black judge to serve on the court. In 2002, she lost reelection by 77 votes to Republican George Coleburn.

In the 1980s, Birckhead was the first Black person to drive the boardwalk tram in Ocean City, Maryland. From 1992 to 2002, Birckhead chaired the board of directors of SHORE UP! Inc., a nonprofit organization. She held a supervisory position at the Campbell's. She worked as a substitute teacher and also sold Avon Products for over thirty years.

== Personal life ==
In the mid-1960s, Birckhead married Lewis Birckhead. They had two daughters in addition to Lewis' son. She was a longtime member of Ebenezer United Methodist Church in Snow Hill. Birckhead's husband died in 1994. She died on February 9, 2022. Her daughter Janeen L. Birckhead was appointed the adjutant general of Maryland the following year.

== See also ==
- Black women in American politics
- List of African-American jurists
