= Myles Deering =

United States general (born 1953)

Myles Lynn Deering
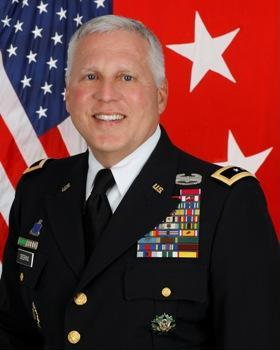
- Deering, before 2012
- Born: 1953 (age 72–73)
- Military career
- Allegiance: United States
- Branch: Army National Guard
- Service years: 1971–2015
- Rank: Major general
- Commands: Adjutant General, State of Oklahoma; Oklahoma National Guard; 45th Infantry Brigade
- Awards: Legion of Merit; Bronze Star

Myles Lynn Deering (born 1953) is a retired Army National Guard major general who served as the 19th adjutant general of Oklahoma. General Deering was appointed by Governor of Oklahoma Brad Henry in 2009 following the promotion of Harry M. Wyatt III to the position of director, Air National Guard. On December 10, 2010, Governor-elect Mary Fallin announced that she would retain General Deering in his position as adjutant general.

As adjutant general, General Deering is the highest-ranking member of the Oklahoma National Guard. He is responsible for managing the affairs of the Oklahoma Military Department and for advising the governor, who is the Commander-in-Chief of the Guard. Additionally, Governor Henry and Governor Fallin both appointed General Deering to serve as the Secretary of the Military in the governor's cabinet.

== Military career ==
Myles Deering enlisted in the United States Army Reserve in October 1971. In 1974, he transferred into the Texas Army National Guard and entered the Officer Candidate School program. He received his commission as a second lieutenant in 1976 in the 36th Infantry Brigade. Lieutenant Deering then transferred to the Oklahoma Army National Guard's 45th Infantry Brigade in 1977. In March 1980 he was promoted to the rank of captain and assumed command of the Combat Support Company, 1st Battalion, 180th Infantry Regiment. By December 1981, Captain Deering was assigned to the 45th Infantry Brigade's headquarters where he served as an intelligence assistant. In 1983, Deering became the commander of Company C, 1st Battalion, 180th Infantry Regiment based in Holdenville, Oklahoma.

In May 1986, Captain Deering moved to the 700th Support Battalion in Oklahoma City, where he served as that Battalion's executive officer. He was promoted to major in February 1988. After briefly being assigned to the headquarters of the 45th Infantry Brigade, Major Deering returned to the 700th Support Battalion in 1992 and assumed command of that unit with his promotion to lieutenant colonel. In June 1995, Colonel Deering became the executive officer for the 45th Infantry Brigade. Colonel Deering was selected to serve as the secretary to the General Staff at Headquarters of the Oklahoma National Guard. He would then be assigned to serve as the director of the Human Resources Directorate within the Headquarters. He was promoted to full colonel in July 1999.

Colonel Deering would become the director for plans, operations, and training for the Oklahoma Army National Guard. In that position, Colonel Deering was responsible for all operations and training within the Army Guard. He would next serve as Chief of the Joint Staff for the Joint Force Headquarters in May 2003. By December 2004, Colonel Deering was reassigned to 45th Infantry Brigade and assumed command of the entire brigade as a brigadier general (with promotion in February 2005).

Within months of assuming command of the 45th Infantry Brigade, General Deering was deployed to New Orleans as commander of the Oklahoma National Guard's Joint Task Force following the devastation of Hurricane Katrina and Hurricane Rita. Upon his arrival, he assumed command over 15,500 Army, National Guard, and Marine personnel providing disaster relief operations and support. In October 2007, General Deering and the 45th Infantry Brigade were deployed to Iraq in support of Operation Iraqi Freedom. He served as the commander, Joint Area Support Group – Central for Multi-National Force – Iraq. He returned in November 2008 and was promoted to major general on November 13, 2008, with his assignment as director, manpower and personnel (J-1) at the National Guard Bureau in the Pentagon in Washington, D.C. He was appointed as the Adjutant General of the Oklahoma National Guard in February 2009.

== Henry administration ==
On February 3, 2009, Governor of Oklahoma Brad Henry appointed General Deering to become the Adjutant General of Oklahoma. In that position, Deering is responsible for the operations and has command over all aspects of the Oklahoma Army and Air National Guard.

== Fallin administration ==
On December 10, 2010, Governor-elect Mary Fallin announced that she would retain General Deering under her administration in both of his positions as secretary of the military and as adjutant general.

== Personal life ==
Deering received a Bachelor of Business Administration in Management from the University of Oklahoma in 1980. He also received a Master of Science degree in Natural and Applied Sciences from Oklahoma State University in 1996 and a Master of Strategic Studies from the United States Army War College in 2000.

== Dates of ranks ==
Insignia	Rank	Date
	Major General (USA/ARNG)	2008
	Brigadier General (ARNG/USA)	2005
	Colonel (ARNG)	1999
	Lieutenant Colonel (ARNG)	1992
	Major (ARNG)	1988
	Captain (ARNG)	1979
	1st Lieutenant (ARNG)	1979
	2nd Lieutenant (USA)	1976

== Decorations and badges ==
U.S. military decorations
Legion of Merit
Bronze Star
Meritorious Service Medal (with 1 Silver Oak Leaf and 1 Bronze Oak Leaf Clusters)
Army Commendation Medal
Army Achievement Medal (with 1 Bronze Oak Leaf Clusters)
U.S. service (campaign) medals and service and training ribbons
National Defense Service Medal (with 2 Service Stars)
Iraq Campaign Medal (with 1 Service Star)
Global War on Terrorism Service Medal
Humanitarian Service Medal (with 1 Service Star)
Army Reserve Components Achievement Medal (with 1 Silver Oak Leaf Cluster and 1 Bronze Oak Leaf Cluster)
Armed Forces Reserve Medal (with Gold Hourglass Device)
Non-Commissioned Officer Development Ribbon
Army Service Ribbon
Army Reserve Components Overseas Training Ribbon (with Numeral 2)

Political offices
Preceded by Harry M. Wyatt III	Oklahoma Secretary of the Military; Under Governors Brad Henry and Mary Fallin; February 3, 2009 - February 7, 2015	Succeeded by Robbie L. Asher
Preceded by Harry M. Wyatt III	Adjutant General of Oklahoma; Under Governors Brad Henry and Mary Fallin; February 3, 2009 - February 7, 2015	Succeeded by Robbie L. Asher
