= Michael C. Thompson =

Soldier in Oklahoma, US

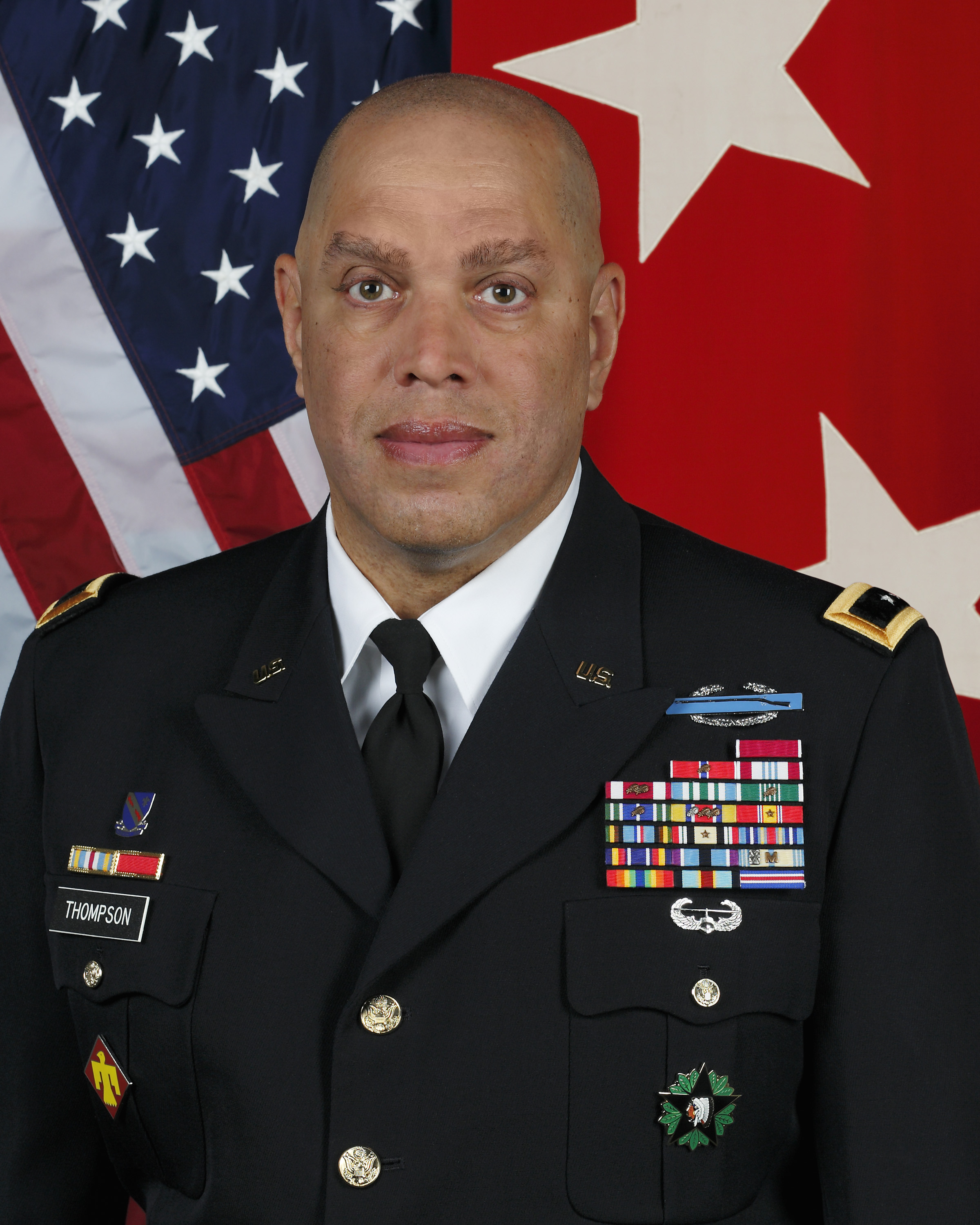
- Michael Thompson in 2017

21st Adjutant General of Oklahoma
- In office November 15, 2017 – November 10, 2021
- Governor: Mary Fallin; Kevin Stitt
- Preceded by: Robbie Asher
- Succeeded by: Thomas Mancino

Commissioner of the Oklahoma Department of Public Safety
- In office 2011–2017
- Governor: Mary Fallin
- Preceded by: Kevin Ward
- Succeeded by: Rusty Rhoades

Personal details
- Spouse: Deborah
- Children: Brandon and Jared
- Occupation: State Trooper

Military service
- Allegiance: United States; Oklahoma
- Branch/service: Oklahoma Army National Guard
- Years of service: 1983–2022
- Rank: Major General

Michael C. Thompson is a retired United States General Officer and Oklahoma Army National Guard member who served as the 21st Adjutant General of Oklahoma from 2017 to 2021. He was a Major General in the United States Army National Guard and was a member of the Oklahoma Governor's Cabinet.

Thompson previously served concurrently as the Oklahoma Secretary of Safety and Security and the Commissioner of the Oklahoma Department of Public Safety. In his capacity as Public Safety Commissioner, Thompson also was in charge of the Oklahoma Highway Patrol. As Safety and Security secretary, he was a member of the Oklahoma Governor's Cabinet and was responsible for directing all state public safety, law enforcement and corrections agencies.

== Promotions ==
Oklahoma Highway Patrol Promotions
Insignia	Rank	Date
	Commissioner	2011
	Captain/Major	2003
	1st Lieutenant	2000
	2nd Lieutenant	1995
	Trooper	1990

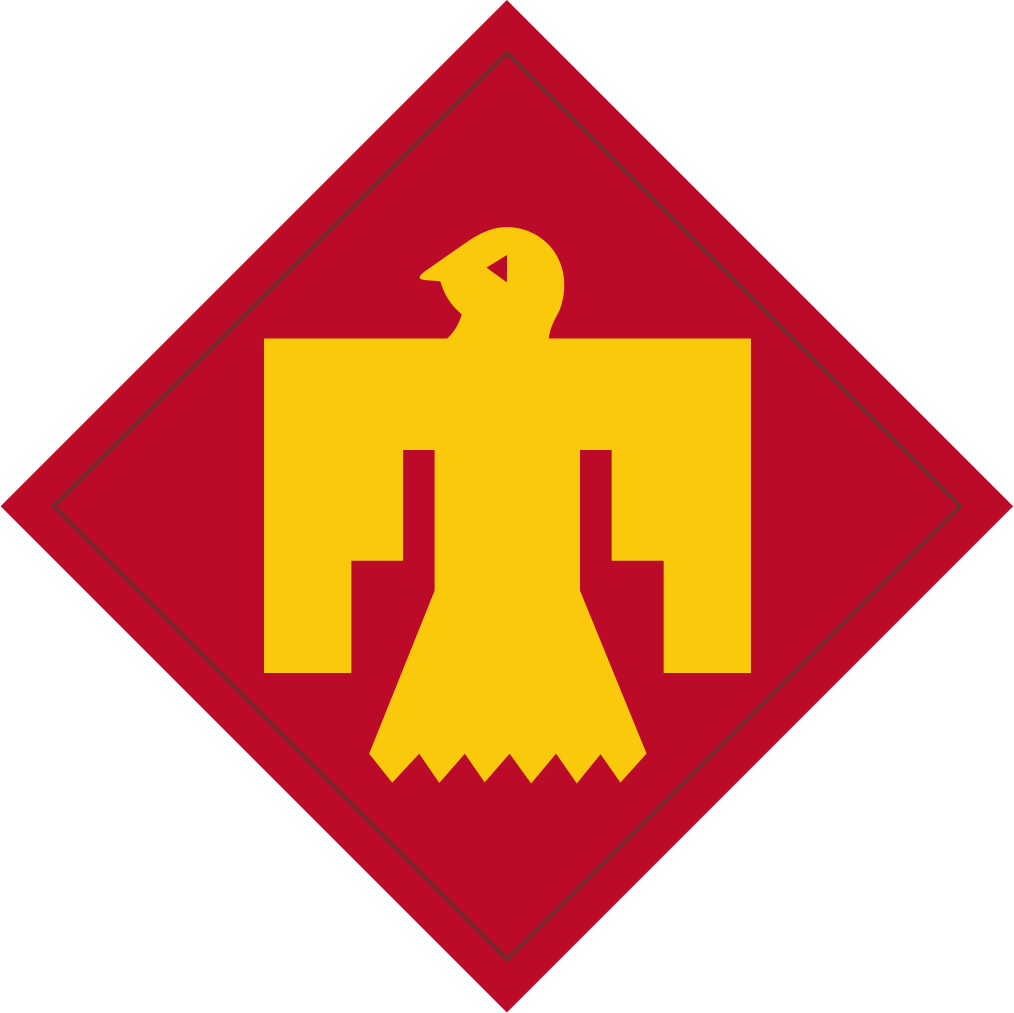
45th Infantry Brigade Combat Team (United States)

== Biography ==
Thompson earned a Bachelor of Science in criminal justice from Langston University, and a Master of Science from Oklahoma State University. Thompson is a graduate of the resident Army War College, where he earned a second graduate degree, a Master of Strategic Studies. Thompson has been accepted in, and has completed course work towards a doctorate degree at Oklahoma State University. Thompson is a graduate of the 208th session of the FBI National Academy in Quantico, Va for senior law enforcement officials. Thompson also is a graduate of the Certified Public Manager’s Program offered by Oklahoma’s office of Personnel Management, a member of Leadership Oklahoma class XXVI and most recently has been recognized as a Henry Toll Fellow through the Council of State Government.

Thompson graduated from the Oklahoma Department of Public Safety's 45th Oklahoma Highway Patrol Academy in 1990. He served 22 years with the Patrol, eventually rising to the rank of major. While serving as a patrol major, Thompson was appointed by Oklahoma Governor Mary Fallin as Cabinet Secretary and DPS Commissioner in February 2011.

Thompson began his military career when he enlisted in the Oklahoma Army National Guard on December 13, 1983 in Oklahoma City. Thompson received his commission in 1986 through Officer Candidate School as an infantry second lieutenant. Thompson is currently assigned as the chief of staff for the Oklahoma Army National Guard. Thompson’s notable previous assignments include:

- As a colonel, Thompson was assigned as brigade commander for the 90th Troop Command, in charge of over 2000 soldiers.
- As a lieutenant colonel and commander of the 1st Battalion, 279th Infantry Regiment, Thompson’s battalion led the way in providing relief and support to New Orleans in the wake of Hurricane Katrina.
- As a major during Operation Iraqi Freedom, Thompson commanded a security force unit which was the first infantry unit from Oklahoma to earn the Combat Infantry Badge since the Korean War.
- As a captain, Thompson was one of the first responders to the 1995 Oklahoma City Bombing.

Thompson’s awards include the Legion of Merit, two Bronze Star Medals, Defense Meritorious Service Medal, three Meritorious Service Medals, Global War on Terrorism Expeditionary Medal, Air Assault Badge, Combat Action Badge, and the Combat Infantry Badge. In 2012, Thompson joined the prestigious ranks as a Council of State Governments' Henry Toll Fellow honoree.

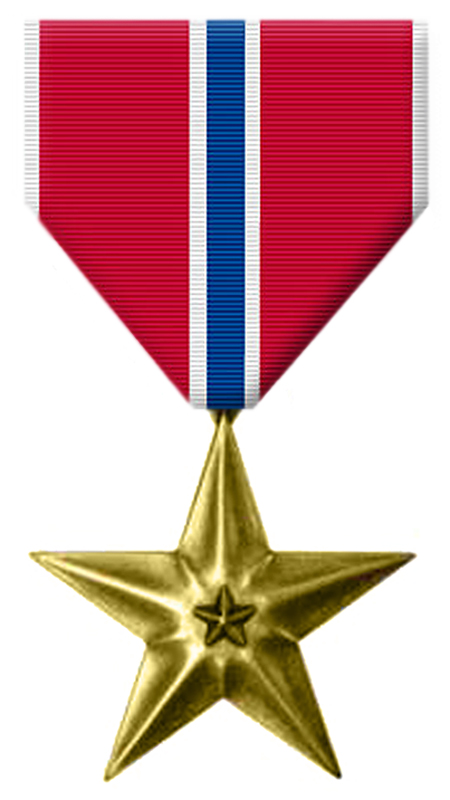

== Personal life ==
Thompson lives in Edmond, Oklahoma, with his wife, Deborah Thompson. The Thompsons have two sons. Their oldest, Brandon Thompson, is a graduate of the United States Military Academy at West Point and is a lieutenant colonel in the United States Army. Their youngest son, 1st Lieutenant Jared Thompson, is a helicopter pilot with the Oklahoma Army National Guard. Lieutenant Jared Thompson is also an Iraqi and Afghan combat veteran.

Political offices
Preceded by Kevin L. Ward	Oklahoma Secretary of Safety and Security; Under Governor Mary Fallin; January 10, 2011 – November 14, 2017	Succeeded by Billy D. Rhoades III
Preceded by Kevin L. Ward	Commissioner of the Oklahoma Department of Public Safety; Under Governor Mary Fallin; January 10, 2011 – November 14, 2017	Succeeded by Billy D. Rhoades III
