= Harry M. Wyatt III =

United States Air Force general

Harry M Wyatt III
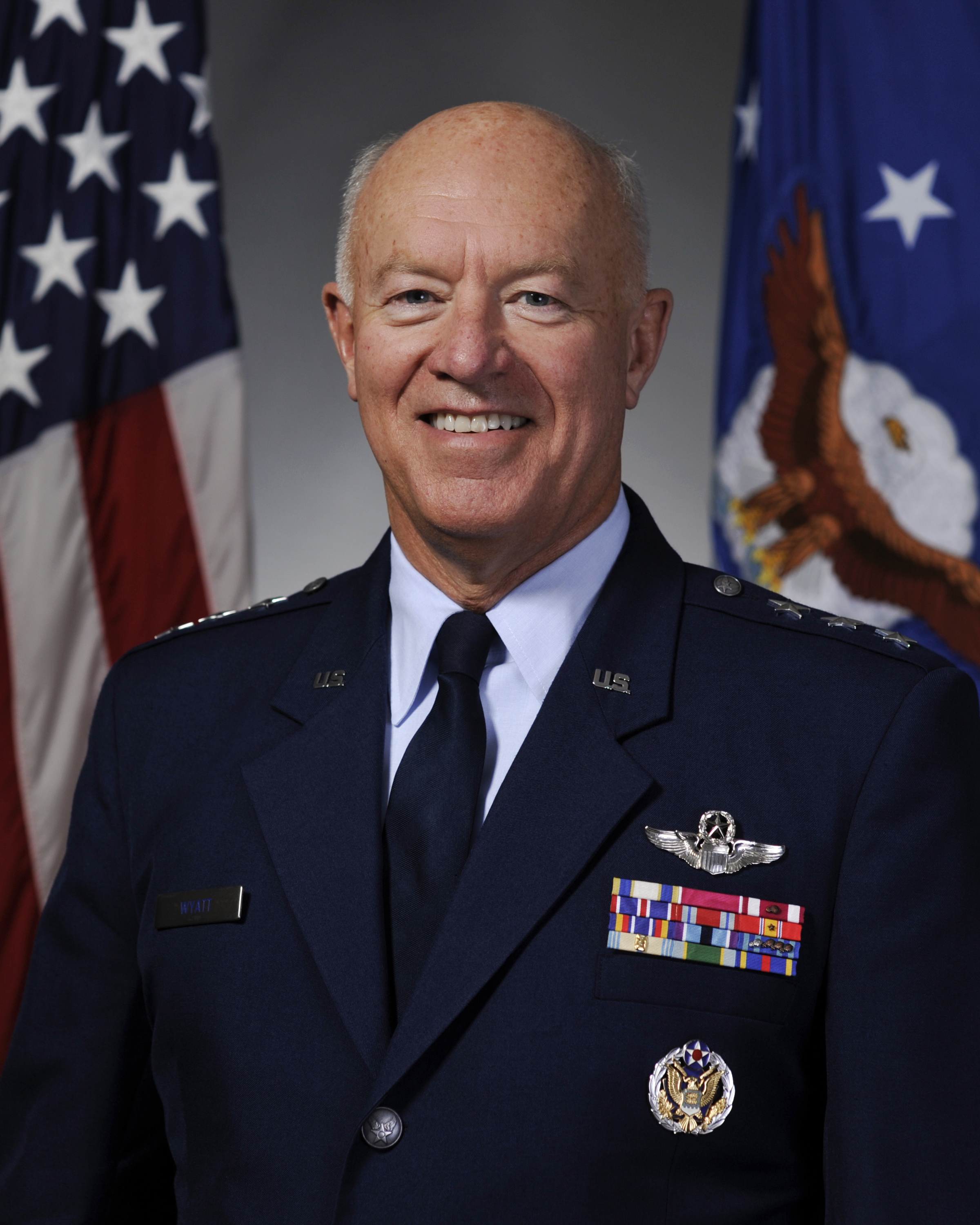
- Lieutenant General Harry M Wyatt III, USAF (Ret.); 14th Director, Air National Guard
- Born: 1949 (age 76–77); Oklahoma, U.S.
- Military career
- Allegiance: United States
- Branch: United States Air Force
- Service years: 1971–2013
- Rank: Lieutenant General
- Nickname: Bud
- Commands: Air National Guard; 138th Fighter Wing; 138th Logistics Group
- Awards: Air Force Distinguished Service Medal (2); Legion of Merit

Harry M. "Bud" Wyatt III (born 1949) is a retired lieutenant general of the United States Air Force (USAF) who last served as 14th Director, Air National Guard. He is also an attorney from Oklahoma and served as the 18th Adjutant General of Oklahoma and the Oklahoma Secretary of Military Affairs. Wyatt maintained a private law practice until his election to the Oklahoma bench.

As director of the Air National Guard, Wyatt was responsible for formulating, developing and coordinating all policies, plans and programs affecting more than 106,800 Guard members in more than 88 flying wings and 200 geographically separated units throughout the United States, the District of Columbia, Puerto Rico, Guam and the Virgin Islands.

On January 30, 2013, Wyatt retired from USAF. At the retirement ceremony, Wyatt received Air Force Distinguished Service Medal for his service.

== Military career ==
Wyatt entered the United States Air Force on June 24, 1971, following his graduation from Southern Methodist University with a Bachelor of Arts degree in business administration. He received his commission on November 24, 1971, as the 50,000th graduate from the Air Force Officer Training School. He graduated undergraduate pilot training from Laredo Air Force Base, Texas on January 26, 1973.

In August 1977, Wyatt left active duty and entered into the Oklahoma Air National Guard, of which he remains a commissioned officer. In 1980, he earned his Juris Doctor degree from the University of Tulsa College of Law. During his tenure with the Guard, Wyatt served as a fighter pilot, flight commander, group commander, vice wing commander, wing commander, and Chief of Staff of the Oklahoma National Guard.

In 2003, Governor of Oklahoma Brad Henry appointed then-Brigadier General Wyatt to the position of Adjutant General of Oklahoma and nominated General Wyatt for appointment to the rank of major general.

On September 18, 2008, then-President of the United States George W. Bush nominated then-Major General Wyatt for assignment as Director, Air National Guard, and appointment to the rank of lieutenant general in the reserve active duty of the Air Force. Wyatt assumed the assignment on February 1, 2009, succeeding General Craig McKinley who was reassigned as the chief of the National Guard Bureau.

== Awards and decorations ==
US Air Force Command Pilot Badge
Headquarters Air Force Badge

Air Force Distinguished Service Medal with bronze oak leaf cluster
Legion of Merit
Meritorious Service Medal with bronze oak leaf cluster
Air Force Outstanding Unit Award
Combat Readiness Medal
National Defense Service Medal with bronze service star
Global War on Terrorism Service Medal
Humanitarian Service Medal
Air Force Longevity Service Award with silver and three bronze oak leaf clusters
Air Force Longevity Service Award (second ribbon to denote tenth award)
Armed Forces Reserve Medal with gold Hourglass device
Small Arms Expert Marksmanship Ribbon
Air Force Training Ribbon

== Effective dates of promotion ==
Promotions
Insignia	Rank	Date
	Lieutenant General (USAF)	February 1, 2009
	Major General (ANG)	October 28, 2003
	Brigadier General (ANG)	July 1, 2002
	Colonel (ANG)	June 30, 1996
	Lieutenant Colonel (ANG)	November 24, 1992
	Major (ANG)	November 24, 1985
	Captain (USAF)	November 24, 1975
	First Lieutenant (USAF)	November 24, 1973
	Second Lieutenant (USAF)	November 24, 1971

Note: United States Air Force (USAF) and Air National Guard (ANG)

Political offices
Preceded by Stephen Cortright	Oklahoma Secretary of the Military; Under Governor Brad Henry; 2003–2009	Succeeded by Myles Deering
Military offices
Preceded by Stephen Cortright	Adjutant General of Oklahoma; 2003–2009	Succeeded by Myles Deering
Preceded by Craig McKinley	Director of the United States Air National Guard; 2009–2013	Succeeded by Stanley E. Clarke III
