= Janeen L. Birckhead =

U.S. military official

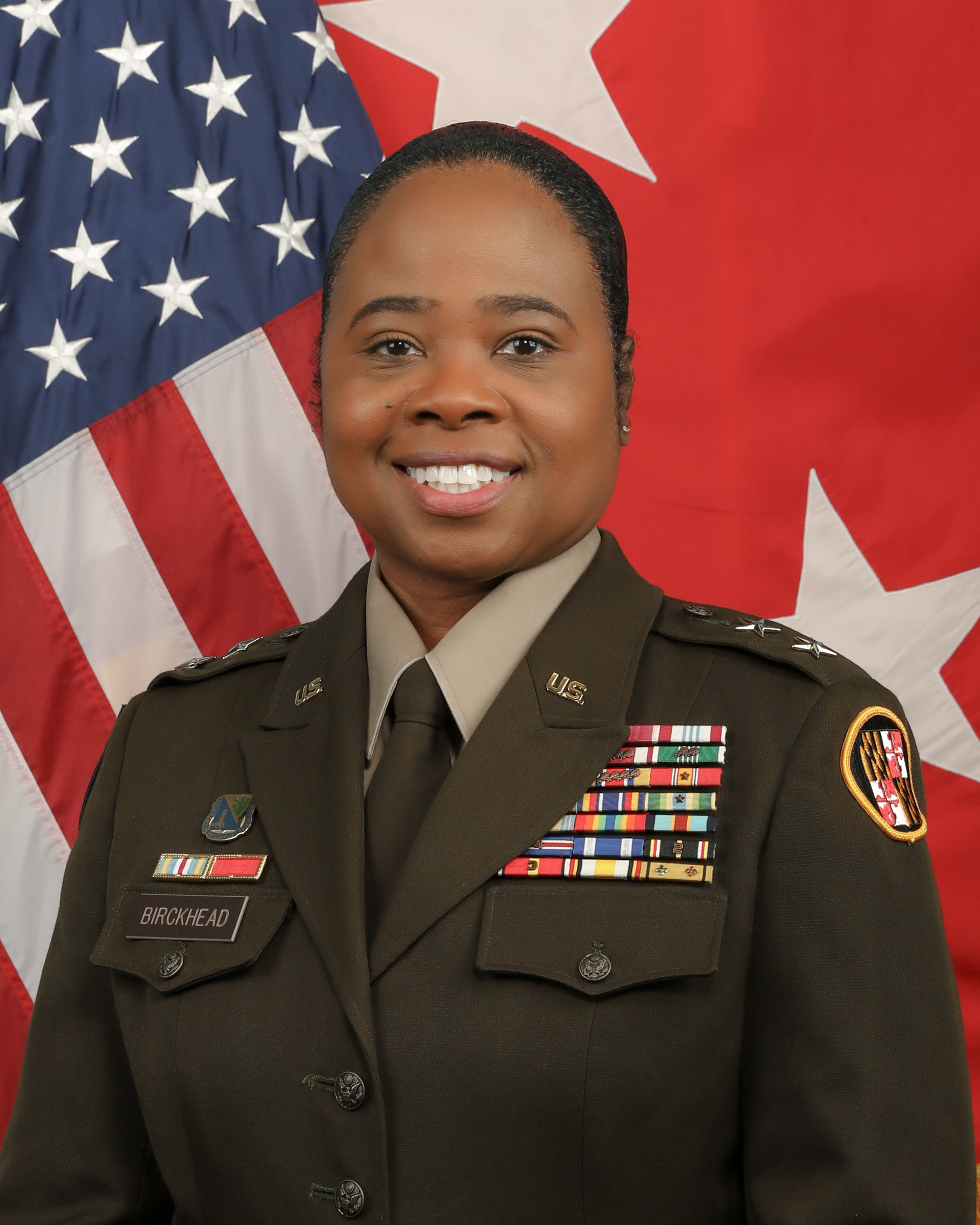
- Education: Hampton University (BA); University of Maryland University College (MA); United States Army War College (MSS)
- Military career
- Branch: U.S. Army
- Service years: 1991–present
- Rank: Major general
- Commands: Maryland Military Department

Janeen L. Birckhead is a U.S. military officer serving as the adjutant general of Maryland since April 2023. She is a major general of the Maryland Army National Guard. She was previously a senior advisor in the Bureau of Trust Funds Administration and the assistant adjutant general from June 2018 to April 2023.

== Career ==
Birckhead was born to Fannie Mae (née Ward) and Lewis Birckhead. Her mother, a local politician, was the first African American elected to a countywide office in Worcester County, Maryland and the first to serve as a mayor on the Eastern Shore of Maryland. Birckhead was raised in Snow Hill, Maryland where she attended Snow Hill Elementary, Middle, and High School. Starting at the age of 14, she began working at a fast-food restaurant in Ocean City, Maryland during the summers. She was on the basketball cheerleading squad at her high school and was a member of its 4-H club.

In 1991, she completed a B.A. in political science at Hampton University where she was a member of the Reserve Officers' Training Corps. She earned a M.A. in management from the University of Maryland University College and a M.S.S. in strategic studies at the United States Army War College.

Birckhead joined the United States Army as a second lieutenant on May 12, 1991. From June to November that year, she attended chemical school at Fort McClellan. She then served as a chemical officer in the 419th Chemical Detachment in Washington, D.C. until May 1993. She was then transferred to 29th Rear Area Operations Center until August 1995. From 1995 to 1996, she was the aide-de-camp to James F. Fretterd, the Adjutant General in Baltimore Maryland.

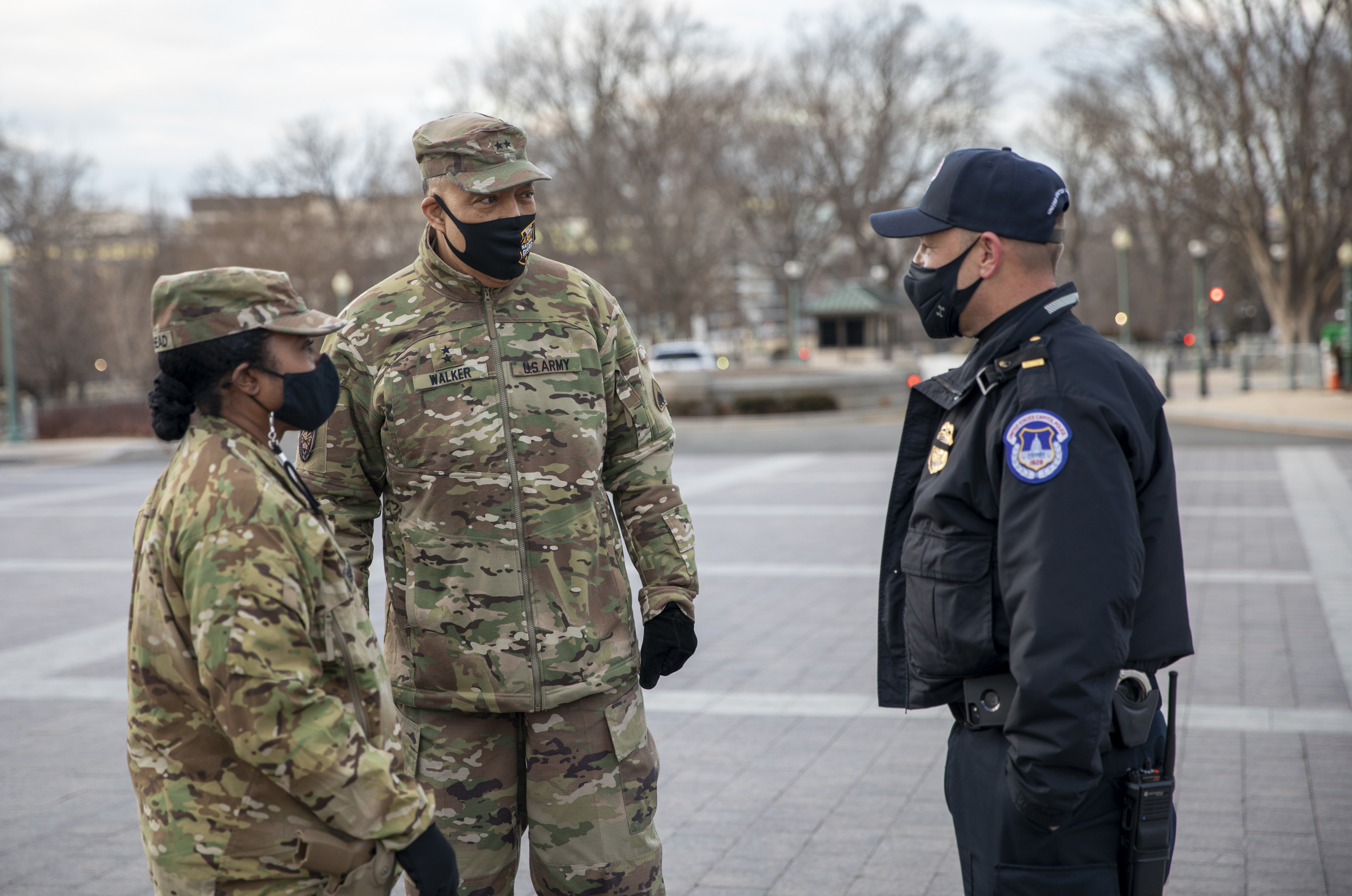
Birckhead with members of the National Guard and the U.S. Capitol Police, January 2021

From April 2017 to May 2018, Birckhead served as the director of legislative affairs of the Maryland National Guard. She served as the assistant adjutant general from June 2018 to April 2023. She had a dual-hatted assignment from March 2020 to May 2023 as the deputy commanding general-reserve affairs of the United States Army War College. During her tenure, Birckhead assisted the Hogan administration with addressing equity issues in distribution of the COVID-19 vaccine in Maryland, and was selected by the D.C. National Guard to be the Task Force Capitol Grounds Commander for the presidential inauguration of Joe Biden. She was also a senior advisor in the Bureau of Trust Funds Administration in the within the Bureau of Indian Affairs. In March 2023, Birckhead was inducted into the Maryland Women's Hall of Fame.

In April 2023, Birckhead was promoted to major general and named by governor Wes Moore as the 31st adjutant general of Maryland. She heads the Maryland Military Department. She is the only Black woman leading a state military.

== See also ==
- List of current United States National Guard major generals
- Military history of African Americans
- Women in the United States Army
