= Adjutant General of Oklahoma =

Highest-ranking military official in Oklahoma, US

The Adjutant General of Oklahoma is the highest-ranking military official in the state of Oklahoma, subordinate only to the Governor of Oklahoma. The highest officer of the Oklahoma National Guard, the Adjutant General is the principal advisor to the Governor on military affairs and the head of the Oklahoma Military Department as the Secretary of the Military.

The current state adjutant general of Oklahoma is Major General Thomas H. Mancino. Mancino was appointed by Governor Kevin Stitt on November 10, 2021.

== Eligibility and appointment ==
The adjutant general is appointed by the Governor of Oklahoma, and confirmed by the Oklahoma Senate, to serve at the pleasure of the governor with no set term.

Once appointed, the adjutant general is elevated to the rank of major general.

To be eligible for hold the office of adjutant general, an officer must be federally recognized as being part as of the Oklahoma National Guard and the United States National Guard and must hold at least the rank of colonel for at least three years prior to appointment. However, should the Oklahoma National Guard be federalized and no person in the state meets these requirements, the governor may appoint anyone that meets these requirements that served in the previous ten years with at least two years of federal service at the rank of colonel or higher.

== Duties ==
The governor is the Commander-in-Chief of the Oklahoma Military with the Adjutant General responsible for running the day-to-day operations of the Military Department of Oklahoma. According to state law, the Adjutant General is subordinate only to the governor and is also his or her principal military adviser. The Adjutant General is responsible for the supervision of direction of the Oklahoma National Guard when in the service of the state at the direction of the governor. The Adjutant General is also responsible for the organization, training and other activities of the National Guard. As the second highest commander in the state, the Adjutant General is responsible for carrying into effect the orders of the governor as Commander-in-Chief. The governor may proscribe “other military and defense duties” to the Adjutant General as deemed necessary.

As the head of the Military Department, the Adjutant General has full control over state funds allotted in support of the National Guard. Funds are controlled, deposited, expended and accounted for at the sole direction of the Adjutant General. The Adjutant General may order any record kept at individual account audited at his discretion. Also, the Adjutant General is the Trustee of the Military Department and may act as such when accepting funds, land, or property to be used for the National Guard.

The Oklahoma Legislature authorizes the Adjutant General to commission a state police force under OS title 44, section 230. To protect the Oklahoma Military Department's assets and personnel, the Adjutant General may commission state police officers to the Oklahoma Military Department Police to serve in that function. The Oklahoma Military Department Police, with the sole exception of the serving or execution of civil process, shall retain all the powers vested by law as state peace officers. The Oklahoma Military Department Police is a state law enforcement agency that satisfies the criteria for Posse Comitatus. The Posse Comitatus Act is a United States federal law (18 U.S.C. § 1385) passed on June 18, 1878, with the intention of substantially limiting the powers of the federal government to use the military for law enforcement. The act prohibits members of the Marine Corps, Army, Navy, Air Force, and state National Guard forces from exercising law enforcement powers, including those that maintain "law and order" within the United States.

The statute generally prohibits federal military personnel and units of the National Guard under federal authority from acting in a law enforcement capacity within the United States, except where expressly authorized by the Constitution or Congress. The Coast Guard is exempt from the act. The Oklahoma Military Department Police satisfies this stringent criterion. Officers sworn to this office are non-military, civilian state law enforcement personnel.

The Adjutant General is granted the power to lease to any person(s), company(s), or agency(s), the armories of the State, with contracts not to exceed one year. The contract may be terminated by order of the Adjutant General after a written notice of 30 days is given to the other parties in the contract. If legal action is necessary, the Adjutant General can order the Attorney General of Oklahoma to investigate the claims.

The governor has the power to allow National Guardsmen to voluntarily serve under federal authority in certain instances. At the pleasure of the governor, this power may be delegated to the Adjutant General. The Adjutant General, with the consent of the governor, may assist other states in cooperative enforcement programs.

At the discretion of the Adjutant General, an Oklahoma Recruiting Medal may be awarded to any member of the Oklahoma National Guard who is “personally and solely responsible” for recruiting five new members to the Oklahoma National Guard within one year’s time.

The Adjutant General is the commander of the Oklahoma State Guard when the State Guard is organized and active.

== Staff ==
The governor may appoint two assistants to serve under the adjutant general, an assistant adjutant general to manage the Army National Guard of Oklahoma and an assistant adjutant general to manage the Air National Guard of Oklahoma.

Both assistant adjutant generals serve under the rank of brigadier general and at the pleasure of the governor. The assistant adjutant generals are the highest official within their respective branch, only under the adjutant general and the governor.

Within the Department of the Military, the adjutant general may appoint employees of the Military Department to the position of executive assistant and program manager to assist him in running the Military Department.

== Salary ==
State Salary As of 2023, the annual salary of the adjutant general is set at $205,419.60.

Federal: Weekend Drill Pay: $2,339.44, Two Week Annual Training: $8,772.90, Annual Total: $36,846.18

State & Federal = $242,265.78

== Officeholders ==
=== Territorial government ===
BG	Carson Jamison	December 23, 1894	July 10, 1897
BG	Phil C. Rosenbaum	July 10, 1897	March 26, 1898
BG	Bert C. Orner (acting)	March 26, 1898	March 11, 1899
BG	Harry C. Barnes	March 11, 1899	September 4, 1901
BG	E.P. Burlingame	September 4, 1901	February 28, 1906
BG	Alva J. Niles	March 1, 1906	November 16, 1907

=== State government ===
BG	Frank M. Canton	November 16, 1907	June 30, 1916
BG	Ancel S. Earp	July 1, 1916	January 30, 1918
BG	Ennis H. Gipson	February 1, 1918	January 30, 1919
MG	Charles F. Barrett	February 1, 1919	January 28, 1923
MG	Baird H. Markham	January 28, 1923	June 30, 1925
MG	Charles F. Barrett	July 1, 1925	September 19, 1939
BG	Louis A. Ledbetter	September 20, 1939	September 13, 1940
MG	George A. Davis	September 14, 1940	May 6, 1947
MG	Roy W. Kenny	May 7, 1947	March 7, 1965
MG	La Vern E. Weber	March 8, 1965	September 30, 1971
MG	David C. Matthews	October 2, 1971	January 12, 1975
MG	John Coffey Jr.	January 13, 1975	November 19, 1978
MG	Robert M. Morgan	November 20, 1978	January 11, 1987
MG	Donald Ferrell (ANG)	January 12, 1987	January 13, 1991
MG	Tommy G. Alsip	January 14, 1991	June 19, 1992
BG	Gary D. Maynard	June 20, 1992	March 31, 1995
MG	Stephen P. Cortright (ANG)	April 1, 1995	October 21, 2002
MG	Harry M. Wyatt III (ANG) (acting)	October 22, 2002	January 12, 2003
MG	Harry M. Wyatt III (ANG)	January 13, 2003	February 3, 2009
MG	Myles L. Deering	February 3, 2009	February 1, 2015
BG	Robbie L. Asher	February 2, 2015	August 9, 2017
BG	Louis W. Wilham (acting)	August 9, 2017	November 15, 2017
MG	Michael C. Thompson	November 15, 2017	November 10, 2021
MG	Thomas H. Mancino	November 10, 2021	Present

== See also ==
- Governor of Oklahoma
- adjutant general
- Oklahoma National Guard
- United States National Guard
