= Thomas H. Mancino =

U.S. Army general

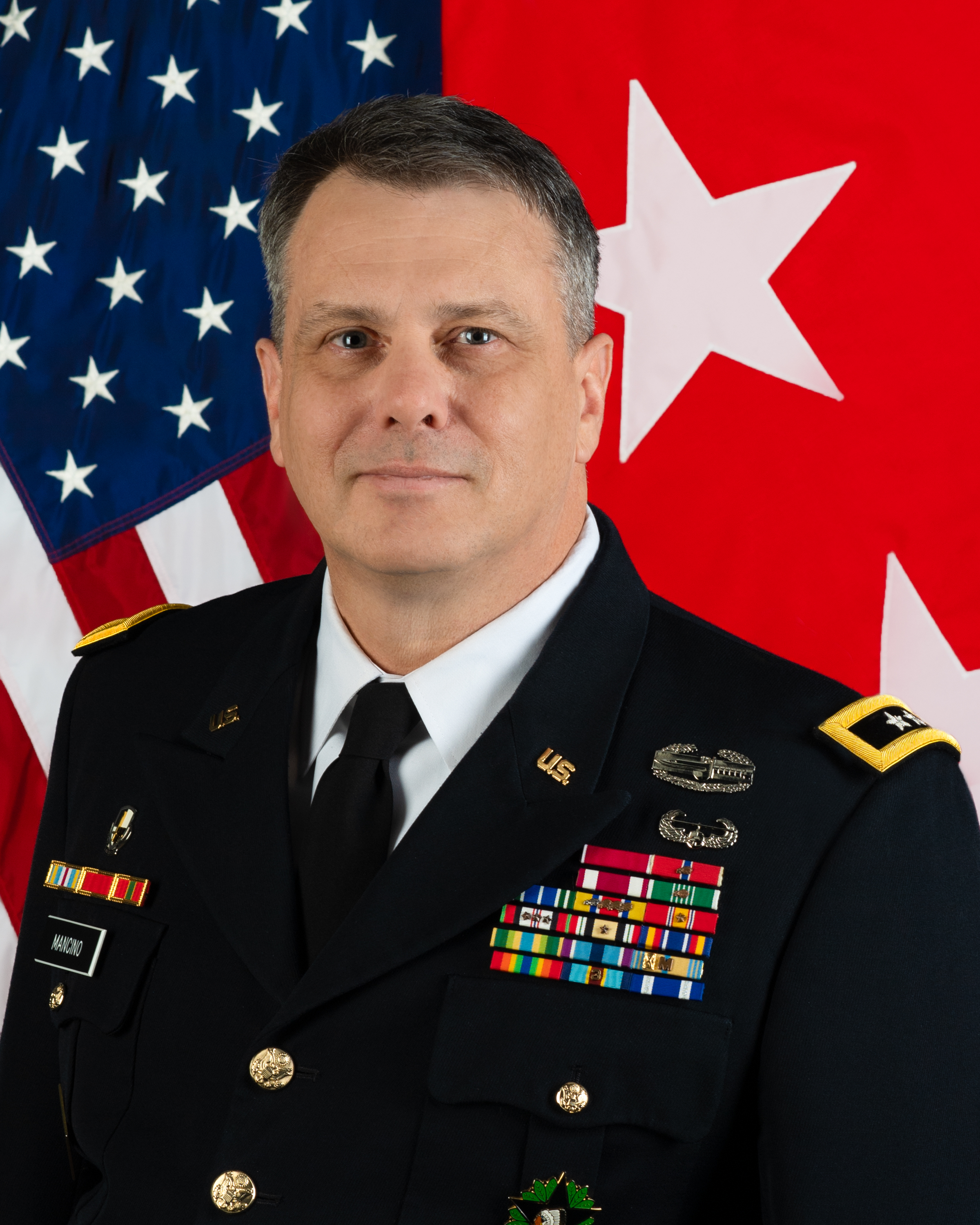

Adjutant General of Oklahoma
- Incumbent
- Assumed office November 10, 2021
- Preceded by: Michael C. Thompson

Personal details
- Born: 8 August 1969 (age 57) Tulsa, Oklahoma, U.S.

Military service
- Branch/service: United States National Guard
- Years of service: 1986–present
- Rank: Major General
- Commands: Adjutant General of Oklahoma; 90th Troop Command; 45th BSTB
- Battles/wars: Iraq War; War in Afghanistan

Thomas H. Mancino is an American officer who has served as the 22nd Adjutant General of Oklahoma since November 2021.

== Biography ==
Thomas H. Mancino served six years in the Oklahoma National Guard before becoming a commissioned officer in 1992. He had three combat deployments: one in Iraq and two in Afghanistan.

In September 2019, he was promoted to Assistant Adjutant General of Oklahoma. On November 10, 2021, Governor Kevin Stitt appointed him Adjutant General of Oklahoma. Citing his constitutional duty to follow a governor's order, Mancino quickly issued an order on behalf of Governor Stitt, rescinding a COVID-19 vaccine requirement for members of the Oklahoma National Guard. At the time, the order violated The Pentagon's policy on vaccination. The James M. Inhofe National Defense Authorization Act for Fiscal Year 2023 required the policy be rescinded in January 2023. After Texas sued to prevent the enforcement of the federal vaccination policy for national guardsmen, the 5th Circuit Court of Appeals issued an injunction preventing its enforcement.
