= I Corps Artillery (United States) =

- Shoulder sleeve insignia of XI Corps
- Active: 1918-1919; 1942-1946; 1950-1980; 1984-2008
- Country: United States
- Branch: United States Army
- Part of: I Corps
- Engagements: World War II; Korean War

I Corps Artillery was a United States Army division-level command active during World War I, World War II, the Korean War and the Cold War. Today the 65th Field Artillery Brigade continues the lineage of I Corps Artillery.

== History ==
=== World War I ===
Constituted on 31 July 1918 in the National Army as Headquarters, 16th Field Artillery Brigade, an element of the 16th Division. Organized on 12 September 1918 at Camp Kearny in California and demobilized on 15 February 1919 in the same location, without having seen combat.

=== World War II ===
Reconstituted on 14 January 1929 in the Regular Army as Headquarters and Headquarters Battery, 16th Field Artillery Brigade. Activated for service in World War II on 15 July 1942 at Camp Gruber in Oklahoma. Reorganized and redesignated on 17 August 1943 as Headquarters and Headquarters Battery, XV Corps Artillery. The unit landed with the rest of the XV Corps Headquarters in Normandy and participated in the breakout from the Normandy beachheads in Operation Cobra.

XV Corps Artillery received the following campaign participation credits for World War II:

- Normandy
- Northern France
- Rhineland
- Ardennes-Alsace
- allied invasion of Germany, Central Europe

XV Corps Artillery was inactivated on 31 March 1946 in Germany.

=== Korean War ===
The unit was redesignated on 12 July 1950 as Headquarters and Headquarters Battery, I Corps Artillery and activated one month later on 12 August 1950 at Fort Bragg in North Carolina. I Corps was sent to South Korea to take charge of the defense of the Pusan perimeter. First elements of I Corps Headquarters arrived in Pusan on 27 August and the corps headquarters became operational on 12 September, under command of Lieutenant General Frank W. Milburn.

I Corps Artillery participated in the entire Korean War and received the following campaign participation credits:

- First UN Counteroffensive
- CCF Spring Offensive
- UN Summer–Fall Offensive
- Second Korean Winter
- Korea, Summer–Fall 1952
- Third Korean Winter
- Korea, Summer 1953

After the war I Corps Artillery remained in South Korea to guard the Korean Demilitarized Zone as part of Eighth United States Army. I Corps Artillery was inactivated on 13 March 1980 in Korea.

=== Cold War ===
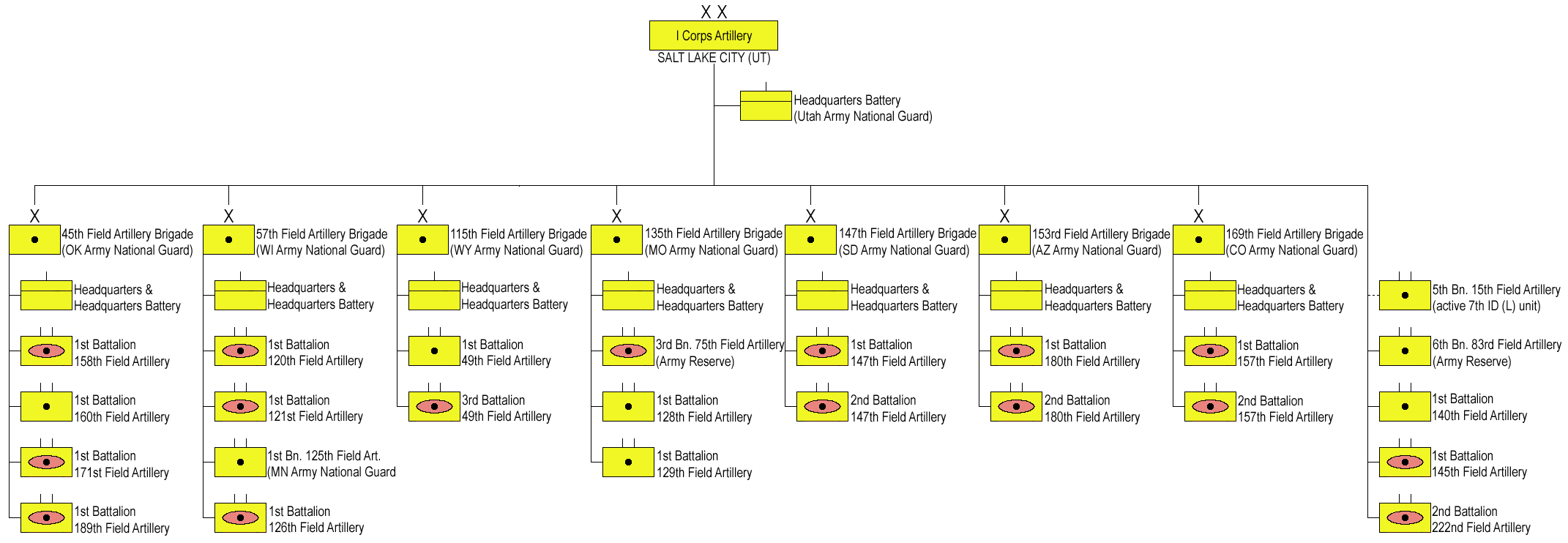
I Corps Artillery organization at the end of 1989 (click to enlarge)

The unit was redesignated on 1 June 1984 as Headquarters, I Corps Artillery, allotted to the Utah Army National Guard, and organized at Salt Lake City in Utah. The Headquarters and Headquarters Battery, XI Corps Artillery, which had served with XI Corps in the Pacific Theater during World War II, was reorganized and redesignated as Headquarters Battery, I Corps Artillery on the same date and assigned to I Corps Artillery.

At the end of the Cold War I Corps Artillery, assigned to I Corps at Fort Lewis in Washington State, was the largest artillery formation in the US Army commanding 24 field artillery battalions in Utah, Wisconsin, Wyoming, Missouri, Minnesota, Colorado, Arizona, South Dakota, and Oklahoma. Units assigned to I Corps Artillery included the following active, Army Reserve, and Army National Guard formations:

- I Corps Artillery, Salt Lake City, (Utah Army National Guard)
  - Headquarters Battery, I Corps Artillery, Salt Lake City, (Utah Army National Guard)
  - 45th Field Artillery Brigade, Enid (Oklahoma Army National Guard)
    - Headquarters and Headquarters Battery
    - 1st Battalion, 158th Field Artillery, (Oklahoma Army National Guard M110A2 unit)
    - 1st Battalion, 160th Field Artillery, (Oklahoma Army National Guard M101 unit supporting the 45th Infantry Brigade)
    - 1st Battalion, 171st Field Artillery, (Oklahoma Army National Guard M110A2 unit)
    - 1st Battalion, 189th Field Artillery, (Oklahoma Army National Guard M110A2 unit)
  - 57th Field Artillery Brigade, Whitefish Bay (Wisconsin Army National Guard)
    - Headquarters and Headquarters Battery
    - 1st Battalion, 120th Field Artillery, (Wisconsin Army National Guard M109A3 unit supporting the 32nd Infantry Brigade (Mechanized))
    - 1st Battalion, 121st Field Artillery, (Wisconsin Army National Guard M109A3 unit)
    - 1st Battalion, 125th Field Artillery, (Minnesota Army National Guard M198 unit)
    - 1st Battalion, 126th Field Artillery, (Wisconsin Army National Guard M109A3 unit)
  - 115th Field Artillery Brigade, Cheyenne (Wyoming Army National Guard)
    - Headquarters and Headquarters Battery
    - 1st Battalion, 49th Field Artillery, (Wyoming Army National Guard M198 unit)
    - 3rd Battalion, 49th Field Artillery, (Wyoming Army National Guard M110A2 unit supporting the 163rd Armored Brigade)
  - 135th Field Artillery Brigade, Seadlia (Missouri Army National Guard)
    - Headquarters and Headquarters Battery
    - 3rd Battalion, 75th Field Artillery, Springfield, Missouri (Army Reserve M109A3 unit)
    - 1st Battalion, 128th Field Artillery, (Missouri Army National Guard M198 unit)
    - 1st Battalion, 129th Field Artillery, (Missouri Army National Guard M198 unit)
  - 147th Field Artillery Brigade, Pierre (South Dakota Army National Guard)
    - Headquarters and Headquarters Battery
    - 1st Battalion, 147th Field Artillery, (South Dakota Army National Guard M109A3 unit)
    - 2nd Battalion, 147th Field Artillery, (South Dakota Army National Guard M110A2 unit)
  - 153rd Field Artillery Brigade, Phoenix (Arizona Army National Guard)
    - Headquarters and Headquarters Battery
    - 1st Battalion, 180th Field Artillery, (Arizona Army National Guard M109A3 unit)
    - 2nd Battalion, 180th Field Artillery, (Arizona Army National Guard M109A3 unit)
  - 169th Field Artillery Brigade, Aurora (Colorado Army National Guard)
    - Headquarters and Headquarters Battery
    - 1st Battalion, 157th Field Artillery, (Colorado Army National Guard M110A2 unit)
    - 2nd Battalion, 157th Field Artillery, (Colorado Army National Guard M110A2 unit)
  - 5th Battalion, 15th Field Artillery, Fort Ord, California (active M198 unit attached to the 7th Infantry Division (Light)
  - 6th Battalion, 83rd Field Artillery, Ogden, Utah (Army Reserve M198 unit)
  - 1st Battalion, 140th Field Artillery, (Utah Army National Guard M198 unit)
  - 1st Battalion, 145th Field Artillery, (Utah Army National Guard M110A2 unit)
  - 2nd Battalion, 222nd Field Artillery, (Utah Army National Guard M109A3 unit)

== Recent times ==
The units location was changed on 1 February 2001 to Riverton in Utah. On 14 September 2008 I Corps Artillery was redesignated as 65th Fires Brigade.
