= 2nd Battalion, 134th Infantry Regiment =

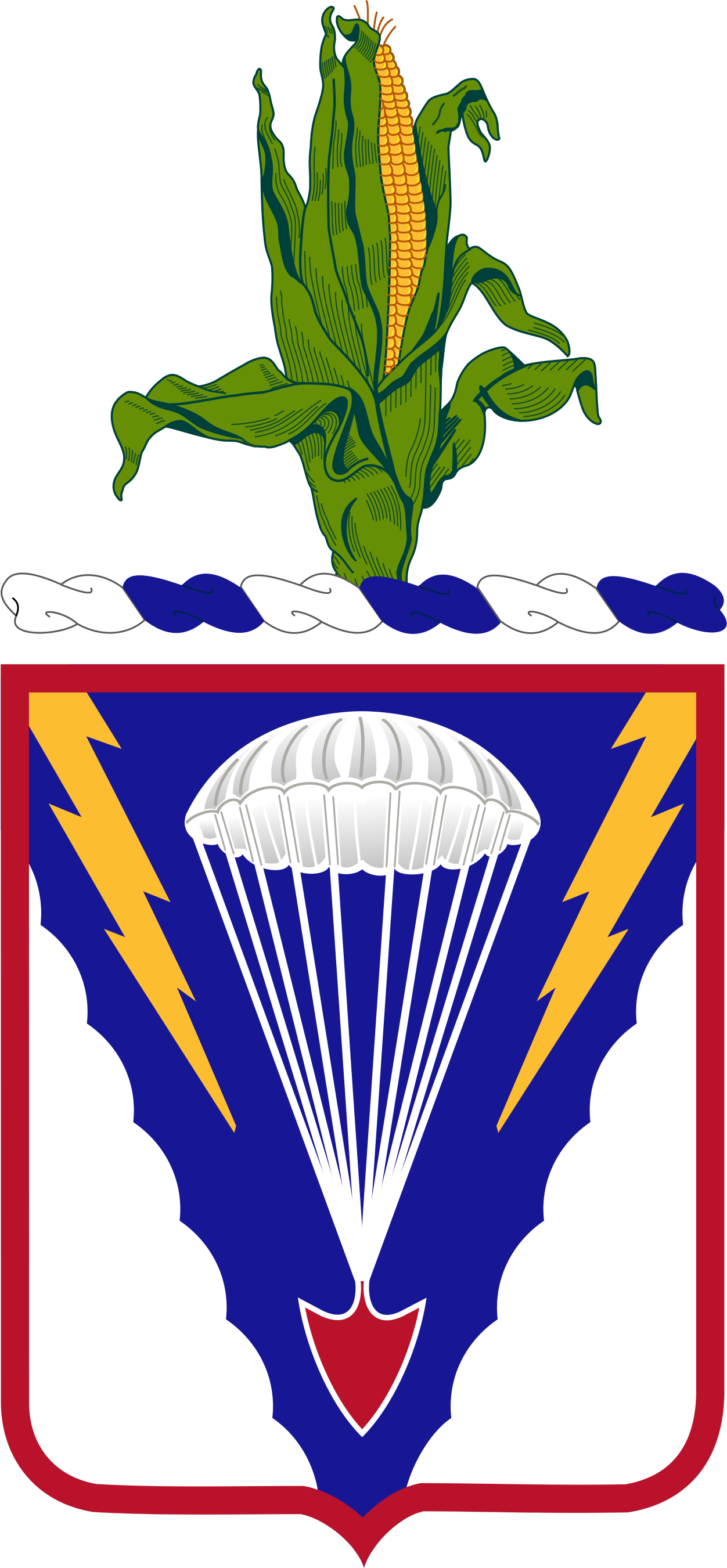
- Coat of arms
- Active: 2019–present
- Country: United States
- Allegiance: Nebraska; United States
- Branch: Nebraska Army National Guard; United States Army National Guard (National Guard of the United States)
- Type: Infantry Battalion
- HHC: Lincoln, Nebraska
- Motto: "Mahpiya Etanhan" (From the Sky)

Insignia
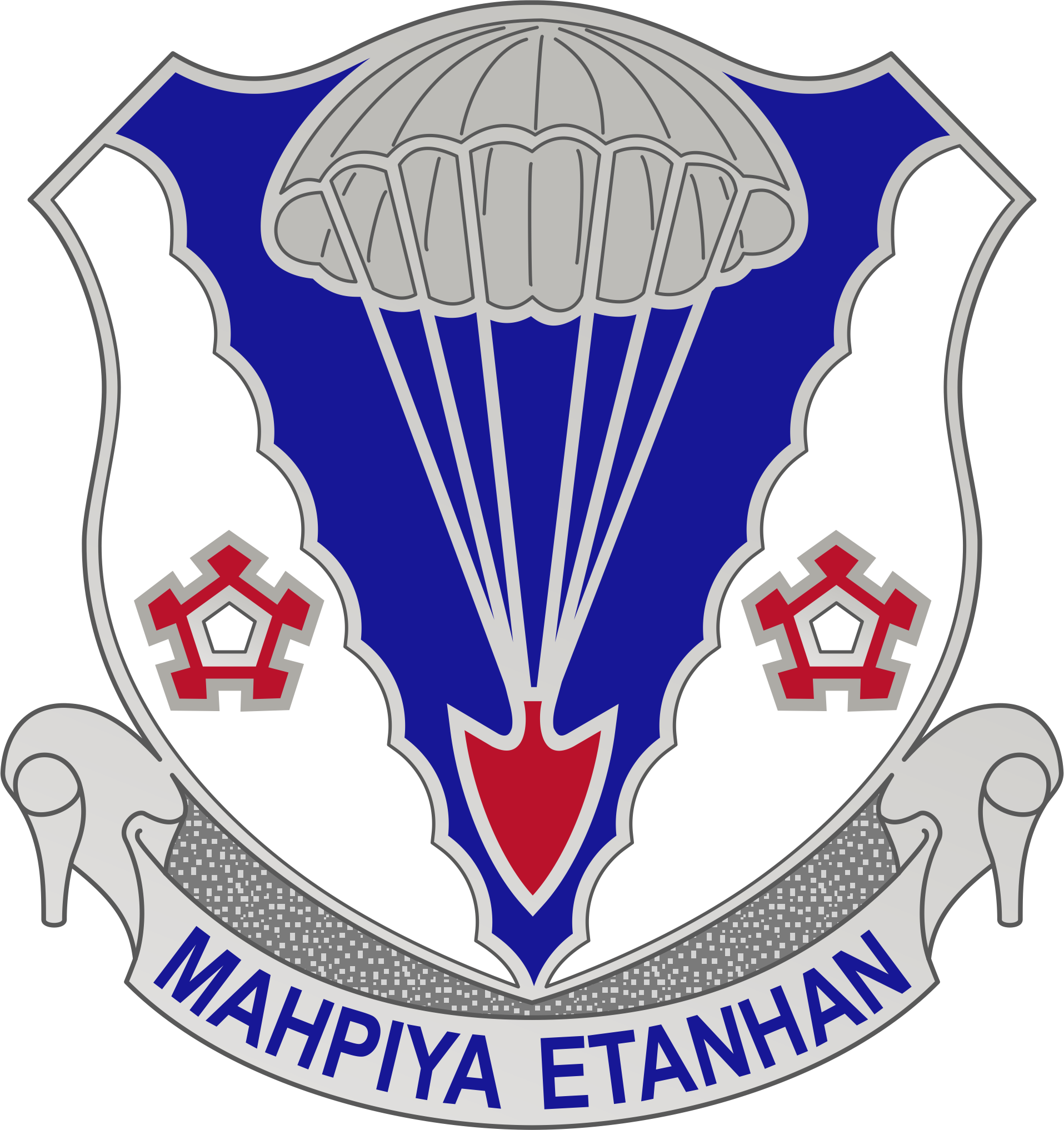
- Distinctive unit insignia

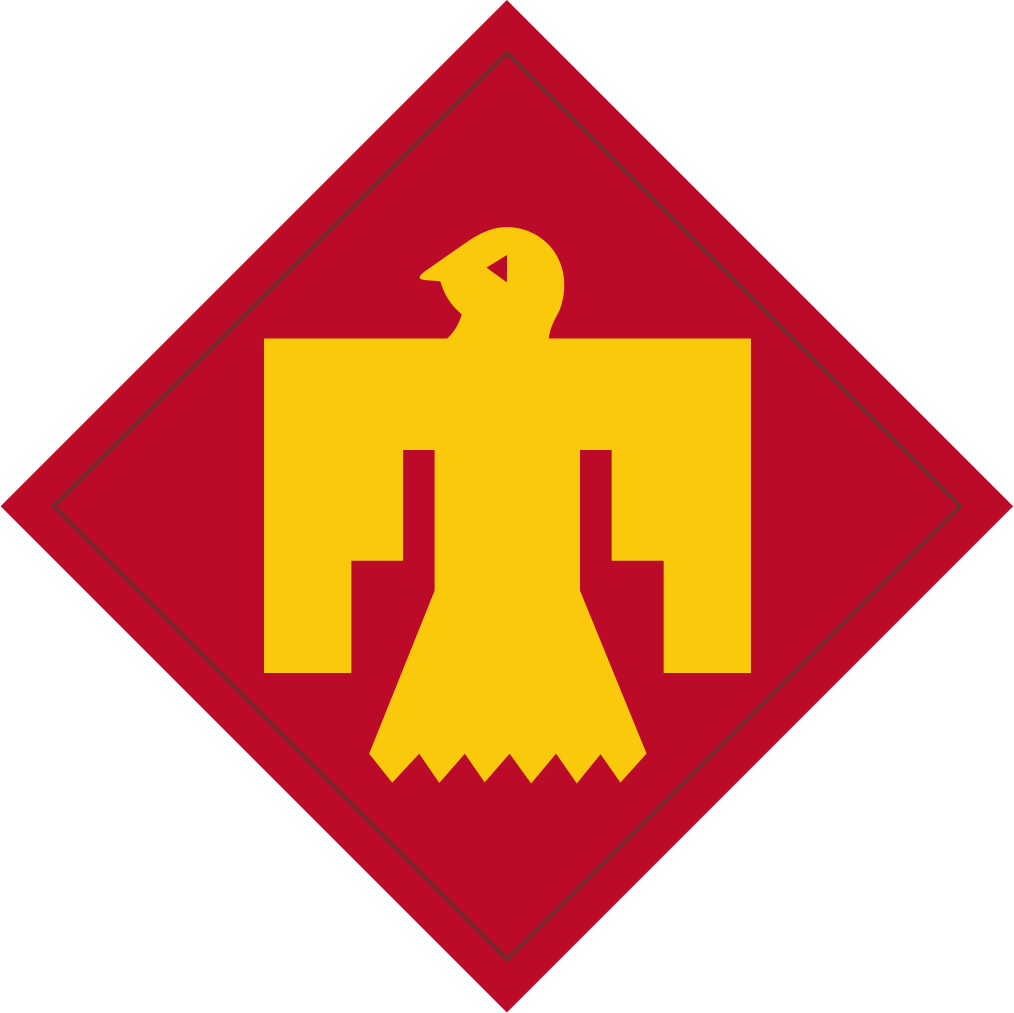
- 45th Infantry Brigade Combat Team Shoulder Sleeve Insignia, worn by 2/134th

The 2nd Battalion, 134th Infantry Regiment is an infantry battalion in the Nebraska Army National Guard.

By extension, it is a member of the United States Army National Guard, and as a currently federally-recognized unit, also a member of the National Guard of the United States.

== History ==
The 2nd Battalion of the 134th Infantry Regiment was established by the Nebraska Army National Guard on 2 November 2019 as part of a restructuring that brought infantry back to its force structure for the first time in a generation. The battalion drew on personnel from the 195th Forward Support Company (Special Operations) (Airborne), formerly at Omaha, the 313th Medical Company at Lincoln, and Company E (Long Range Surveillance), 134th Infantry Regiment, at Yutan, which were all inactivated under the same reorganization.

It is currently a component of the 45th Infantry Brigade Combat Team of the Oklahoma Army National Guard. The present 134th Infantry Regiment shares its name and numerical designation with a former designation of the 134th Cavalry Regiment of the Nebraska National Guard, but it does not perpetuate the lineage of that unit under United States Army Center of Military History regulations.

Due to the Army restructuring its airborne forces, the 134th Infantry Regiment (Airborne) ceased airborne operations in September 2025 and has begun the transition to an air assault role.

== Structure ==
The creation of the 2d Battalion, 134th Infantry Regiment was done through the reorganization and conversion of some existing Army National Guard units as well as the standup of two new companies:

2d Battalion, 134th Infantry Regiment

- Headquarters and Headquarters Company (Lincoln, NE)
- Company A (Yutan, NE) — created from Company E (Long Range Surveillance), 134th Infantry Regiment
- Company B (Yutan, NE)
- Company C (Seymour, IN) — created from Company D (Long Range Surveillance), 151st Infantry Regiment
- Company D (Kearney, NE) — created from Company A, 734th Support Battalion
- Company I (Forward Support), 700th Brigade Support Battalion (Omaha, NE) – created from 195th Forward Support Company (Special Operations)(Airborne)

== Distinctive Unit Insignia ==
=== Blazon ===
A silver or gold metal and epoxied shield-shaped device 1 1/8 inches (2.9 cm) in height blazoned as follows. Argent, on a pile engrailed Azure, an open parachute of the first attached to an arrowhead, point to base, Gules, all between two fortress symbols of the last voided of the first. Attached to sides of the shield, a silver or gold scroll inscribed MAHPIYA ETANHAN in Blue.

=== Symbolism ===
Blue and white are the colors traditionally associated with the Infantry. The arrowhead signifies the location of the regiment, and alludes to the Lakota Sioux, a Native American tribe from Nebraska. The regiment's motto is in the Lakota Sioux language and translates to "From the Sky," and is visualized here by the parachute dropping between the clouds. The parachute canopy denotes the designation of the unit as Airborne. Two red fortress symbols denote the vital role of the Nebraska Territorial Militia in the settlement of the West.

=== Background ===
The distinctive unit insignia was approved on 4 June 2020.

== Coat of Arms ==
=== Blazon ===
==== Shield ====
Argent, on a pile engrailed Azure and between two lightning bolts issuant from chief Or an open parachute of the first attached to an arrowhead, point to base, Gules fimbriated Argent.

==== Crest ====
For the regiments and separate battalions of the Nebraska Army National Guard. From a wreath Argent and Azure, an ear of corn in full ear partially husked Proper.

==== Motto ====
MAHPIYA ETANHAN, translates to "From the Sky."

=== Symbolism ===
Blue and white are the colors traditionally associated with the Infantry. The lightning bolts are symbols of speed and technology. The parachute canopy denotes the designation of the unit as Airborne. The arrowhead signifies the location of the regiment and alludes to the Lakota Sioux, a Native American tribe from Nebraska. The regiment's motto is in the Lakota Sioux language and translates to "From the Sky," and is visualized here by the parachute dropping between the clouds.

=== Background ===
The coat of arms was approved on 13 March 2020.

== See also ==
- 1st Battalion (Airborne), 143rd Infantry Regiment, Texas National Guard
