= 279th Regiment =

279th Regiment may refer to:

- 279th Infantry Regiment, United States
- 279th Independent Shipborne Fighter Aviation Regiment, Russia
- 279th (Lowland) Field Regiment, Royal Artillery, Britain
