= 545th Brigade Engineer Battalion =

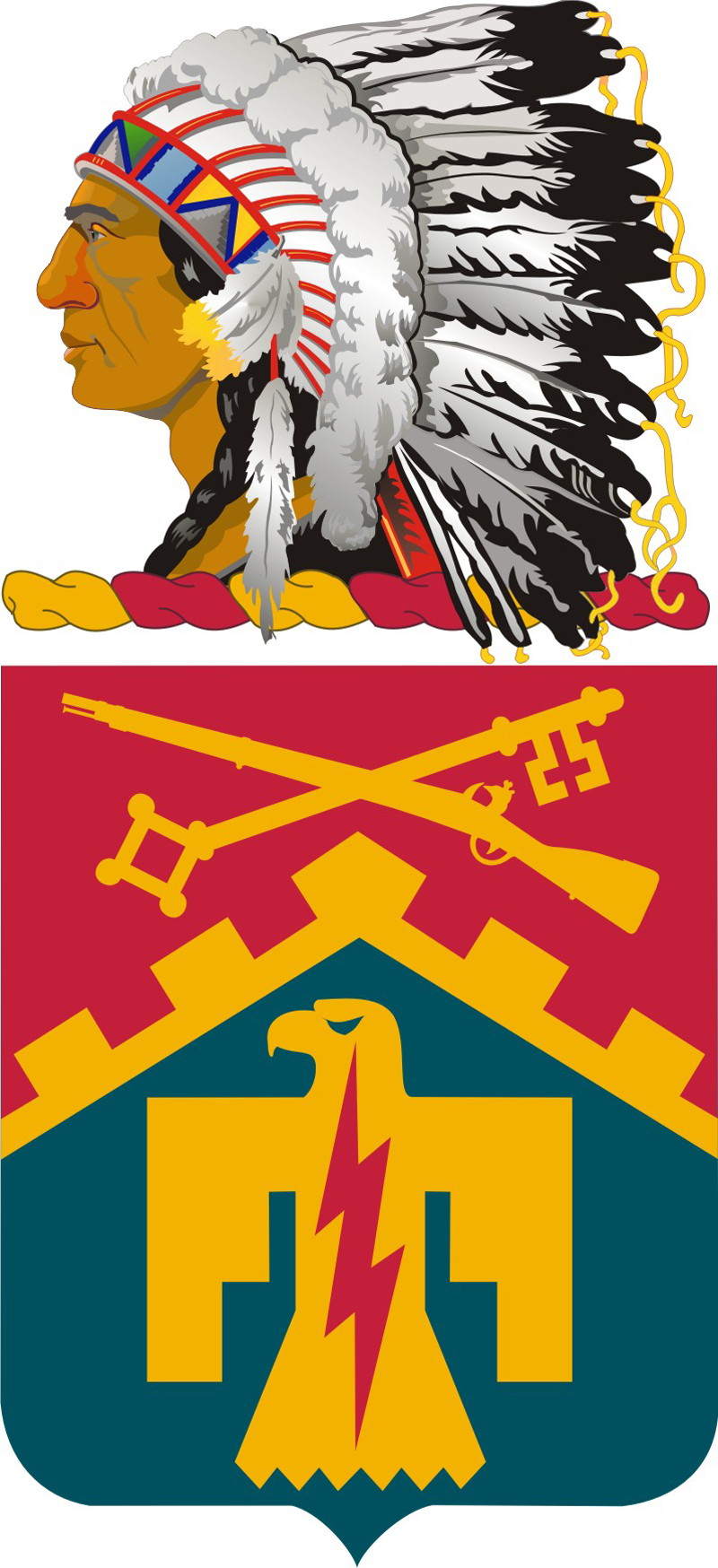
- Coat of arms
- Active: 2008–present
- Country: United States
- Allegiance: United States
- Branch: Oklahoma Army National Guard
- Type: Combat engineer
- Role: Combat support
- Part of: 45th Infantry Brigade Combat Team
- Garrison/HQ: Norman, OK
- Motto: ALL IN
- Colors: Teal, Yellow, Red

Insignia
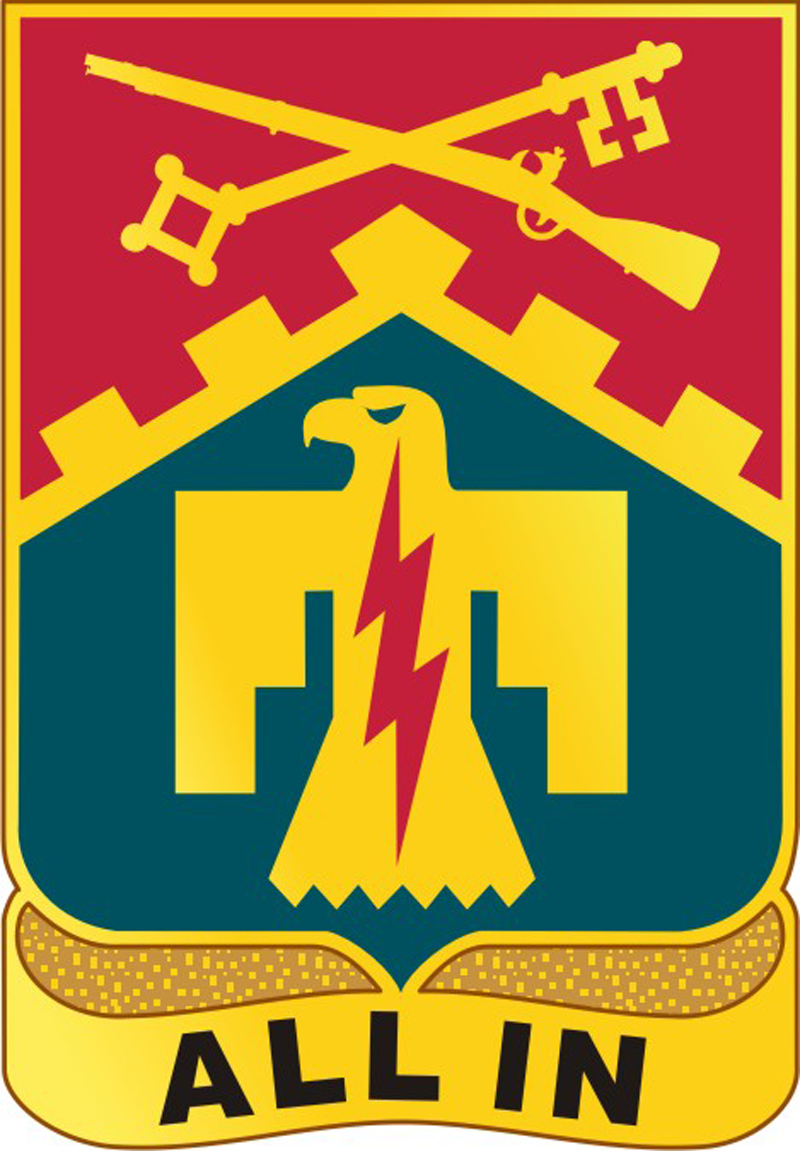
- Distinctive unit insignia

The 545th Brigade Engineer Battalion is a combat engineer battalion in the Oklahoma Army National Guard, part of the 45th Infantry Brigade Combat Team. It was reorganized from the Special Troops Battalion, 45th Infantry Brigade Combat Team and is headquartered in Norman, Oklahoma. It is the newest battalion in the brigade.

== Commanders and command sergeants major ==
Commanders

- LTC Van Kinchen 2007-2008
- LTC John Landreth 2008-2009
- LTC Michael Kinnison 2009-2011
- LTC Thomas Mancino 2011–2013
- LTC Douglas Merritt 2013-2014
- LTC Hiram Tabler 2014-2015
- LTC Cory Newcomb 2015–2018
- LTC Elmer Bruner 2018-2019
- LTC Michael Vanoni 2019-present

Command sergeants major

- CSM Joe Stover 2007-2011
- CSM Gordon Carlin 2011–2012
- CSM Bryon Fry 2012-2013
- CSM Brian Miller 2013-2015
- CSM Robert Apala 2015-2015
- CSM Douglas Kimberlin 2015–2018
- CSM Scott Catlett 2018-2021
- CSM Shannon Carter 2021-present

== Former subordinate units ==
- Headquarters and Headquarters Company, Special Troops Battalion, 45th IBCT at Norman, OK
- Company A (Combat Engineer), Special Troops Battalion, 45th IBCT at Broken Arrow, OK
- Company B (Military Intelligence), Special Troops Battalion, 45th IBCT at Norman, OK
- Company C (Signal), Special Troops Battalion, 45th IBCT (Signal) at Norman, OK

== Deployments ==
Global War on Terror

Operation Noble Eagle

- Pine Bluff Arsenal (245 ENG)

Operation Iraqi Freedom

- Iraq Surge (245 ENG, 245 MI)

Operation Enduring Freedom

- Afghanistan Consolidation III
- Afghanistan Transition I

== History and lineage ==
The Special Troops Battalion, 45th IBCT was formed from new and existing units of the 45th Infantry Brigade Combat Team and received federal recognition on 25 December 2010. Existing units were the 245th Engineer Company, re-designated Company A, and the 245th Military Intelligence Company, re-designated Company B. New elements would be the Headquarters Company, itself composed largely of platoon and smaller elements of the Brigade Headquarters Company, such as the Military Police and CBRN platoons, and Company C, the new Network Support Company (Signal). A special troops battalion, in the modular Army organization, is a collection of units company size and smaller, that contain specialties other than that of the primary function of the Brigade or Division it is assigned to. An infantry STB is composed of an engineer company, a military intelligence company, and a signal company, with a headquarters company that contains support, security, military police and medical platoons and sections.

The battalion motto, "All In," is emblematic of the wide variety of expertise, missions, and capabilities brought together under the battalion's aegis.

The STB deployed with the brigade under the command of LTC Tommy Mancino, to Afghanistan in 2011 and in an unprecedented move was made a battlespace owner in Laghman Province in Eastern Afghanistan. By leveraging its troops' unique skill sets, a few attachments, and the use of combat multipliers available in the theater, the STB conducted combat operations to a high degree of lethality and suffered no fatalities, and still provided the usual support functions it was designed for. Company A (Engineer) conducted thousands of miles of route clearance operations, Company B (MI) collected and analyzed intelligence for the brigade and flew UAV surveillance missions, and Company C (Signal) was present all across the brigade's area of operations, providing critical connectivity and communications, all while also meeting other needs of the brigade, such as force protection on a myriad of small bases and outposts. The STB returned from Afghanistan as part of the 45th Infantry Brigade Combat Team in 2012.

== Distinctive unit insignia ==
Description A Gold color metal and enamel device 1 3/16 inches (3.02 cm) in height overall consisting of a shield blazoned as follows: Per chevron Gules and Azure (Teal Blue), a chevron embattled Or, in chief a musket, barrel up and key, ward up turned to base saltirewise, in base a stylized Thunderbird displayed with wings inverted all of the last with an eye of the field, charged with a lightning bolt of the first. Attached across the bottom of the shield is a Gold wavy scroll inscribed "ALL IN" in Black letters.

Symbolism The Thunderbird, powerful, vigilant and swift, and the colors red and yellow (gold) are adapted from the Brigade's shoulder sleeve insignia. Red and yellow reflect the Spanish heritage and the Thunderbird signifies the warrior spirit of the Battalion. The musket represents the Infantry branch which the Battalion supports. The key is for the Military Intelligence Company. The castle of the Engineer Corps is symbolized by the embattled chevron and the lightning bolt is for the Signal Company. The shield and its elements emphasize the defense, combat readiness and teamwork of the unit.

Background The distinctive unit insignia was approved on 21 April 2010.

== Campaign participation credit ==
Global War on Terror

Operation Enduring Freedom

- Afghanistan, Consolidation III
- Afghanistan, Transition I

=== Battlefield or campaign honors, citations and decorations ===
Company A, previously the 245th Engineer Company, entitled to the Meritorious Unit Citation. DAGO 233-24 (2009)
