= Task Force Phoenix =

International military formation in Afghanistan

Task Force's seventh rotation badge

Task Force Phoenix, or more properly known as Combined Joint Task Force Phoenix (CJTF Phoenix), was an international military formation. It was organized by the United States Central Command (CENTCOM) in 2003-2004 to train and mentor the newly created Afghan National Army/Afghan National Security Forces (ANSF) to establish and maintain law and order throughout Afghanistan using Embedded Training Teams (ETTs).

== History ==
Immediately following the collapse of the Taliban regime, Soldiers from the 10th Mountain Division began the initial development of the Afghan National Army (ANA) as Task Force Phoenix.

=== Mission ===
One of the early mission statements for the formation appears to have been: "Coalition Joint Task Force PHOENIX executes a broad-based training, mentoring, and assistance program in order to enable the Afghanistan National Army (ANA) to field a mission-ready Central Corps NLT [No Later Than] June 2004."

=== Units ===
The first units involved with TF Phoenix were from the 10th Mountain Division out of Fort Drum, New York. Once the 10th Mountain Division rotated home the mission was assumed by units of the Army National Guard and other members of the coalition. Phoenix II built up the first Afghan Corps – the Central Corps, now 201st Corps (Afghanistan) - in Kabul, Afghanistan. Phoenix II was provided by the 45th Infantry Brigade-Oklahoma Army National Guard. Task Force Phoenix II's base support battalion served as the logistics command for the Afghan National Army, providing all logistics support for an army conducting country-wide combat operations. During this rotation, the brigade grew the size of the Afghan National Army to over 14,000 as well as fielding a corps-sized force ahead of schedule. In August 2004, the brigade was replaced in this mission by the 76th Infantry Brigade-Indiana Army National Guard, and subsequently returned home to the United States. Phoenix III took on the daunting task of splitting that Corps into five separate Corps and locating them throughout the country at five strategic centers. Phoenix IV (53rd Infantry Brigade Combat Team (United States) Florida Army National Guard) worked to build up those Corps to full strength. TF Phoenix IV's Training Assistance Group (209th Regiment-Nebraska Army National Guard and 211th Regiment-Florida Army National Guard) stationed at Camp Alamo (inside the Kabul Military Training Center) implemented major improvements to both Basic and Advanced Individual Training programs. Task Force Phoenix V ( 41st Infantry Brigade-Oregon Army National Guard) was the fifth ANA training rotation. The mission continued to expand with TF Phoenix V taking on additional responsibilities associated with training and supporting the Afghan National Police (ANP), as well as continuing to train and mentor the growing ANA. TF Phoenix V was composed primarily of soldiers from the U.S. Army National Guard, with members representing 49 of the 50 states. In addition, they had elements from the regular and reserve components personnel from the Navy, Air Force and Marine Corps attached. Later, the responsibility for the Phoenix missions were assigned to the 27th Brigade Combat Team of the New York Army National Guard took command of Task Force Phoenix on 19 April 2008 from the 218th BCT, South Carolina Army National Guard. They were relieved on 19 December 2008 by the 33rd Brigade Combat Team Illinois Army National Guard. In 2009, the 48th Infantry Brigade Combat Team Georgia National Guard assumed command of Task Force Phoenix IX.

The Task Force Phoenix mission consisted of training, coaching and mentoring ANSF. In addition to the ANA and ANP, the ANSF consists of the Afghan National Army Air Corps, the Afghan National Border Patrol (ANBP), and the Afghan National Civil Order Police (ANCOP). Task Force Phoenix consisted of five regional commands which matched the five ANA Corps regions. Initially, these sub-commands were named Regional Corps Advisory Commands (RCAC) and Regional Police Advisory Commands (RPAC): RCAC/RPAC-S, RCAC/RPAC-W, RCAC/RPAC-E, RCAC/RPAC-C, and RCAC/RPAC-N). In 2007, these sub-commands were placed under newly created Afghanistan Regional Security Integration Commands (ARSIC). The ARSIC included expanded staffs for logistics and administration to better support the RCAC and RPAC. In addition to the five existing regions, a sixth was added for the capital area of Kabul: ARSIC-West (ARSIC-W), ARSIC-Southwest (ARSIC-SW), ARSIC-South (ARSIC-S), ARSIC-Capital (ARSIC-C), ARSIC-North (ARSIC-N), and ARSIC-East (ARSIC-E). ARSIC-S, for example, was stationed at Kandahar Air Field. One example – The ARSIC fell under the command of Combined Joint Task Force Phoenix based out of Camp Phoenix, Kabul, and Combined Strategic Transition Command- Afghanistan (CSTC-A) based out of Camp Eggers, Kabul. With the addition of coalition forces personnel from nations such as Canada, United Kingdom, the Netherlands, Australia, and France, ARSIC were considered multinational coalition commands. RCAC and RPAC however, tended to be maintain national integrity and most were composed of members of the Army National Guard. ARSIC were not under ISAF.

=== Disbanding ===
TF Phoenix was eventually disbanded. With the establishment of NATO Training Mission-Afghanistan (NTM-A) and Combined Security Transition Command – Afghanistan (CSTC-A) the need for TF Phoenix lessened. The task forces' mission changed from one of training to support of the many coalition bases in the Kabul area. Its name was changed to the Kabul Base Cluster Installation Command or KBC.

== Summary ==
CJTF	Period	Manned by
CJTF Phoenix	2003	10th Mountain Division
CJTF Phoenix II	2003-2004	45th Infantry Brigade Combat Team Oklahoma Army National Guard
CJTF Phoenix III	2004-2005	76th Infantry Brigade Combat Team Indiana Army National Guard
CJTF Phoenix IV	2005-2006	53rd Infantry Brigade Combat Team (United States) Florida Army National Guard: 209th Regiment-Nebraska Army National Guard; 211th Regiment-Florida Army National Guard
CJTF Phoenix V	2006-2007	41st Infantry Brigade Combat Team (United States) Oregon Army National Guard: 1st Battalion, 180th Infantry Regiment-Oklahoma Army National Guard (SECFOR); 2nd Battalion, 18th Field Artillery-Fort Sill, Oklahoma (SECFOR)
CJTF Phoenix VI	2007-2008	218th Maneuver Enhancement Brigade South Carolina Army National Guard
CJTF Phoenix VII	2008	27th Infantry Brigade Combat Team New York Army National Guard
CJTF Phoenix VIII	2008-2009	33rd Infantry Brigade Combat Team (United States) Illinois Army National Guard
CJTF Phoenix IX	2009-2010	48th Infantry Brigade Combat Team Georgia National Guard
