= 160th Field Artillery Regiment =

1st Battalion, 160th Field Artillery Regiment
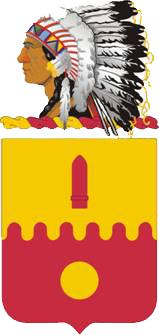
- Coat of arms
- Active: 1921
- Country: United States of America
- Branch: United States Army
- Type: Field Artillery
- Role: IBCT cannon battalion
- Size: Battalion
- Part of: 45th Infantry Brigade Combat Team, Oklahoma ARNG
- Garrison/HQ: Chandler, OK
- Motto: "Toujours En Avant" (Always Forward)
- Colors: Red and gold
- Equipment: M119A3 / M777A2

Commanders
- Notable commanders: William S. Key

Insignia
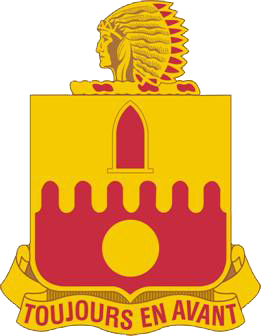
- Distinctive unit insignia

The 1st Battalion, 160th Field Artillery Regiment is headquartered in Chandler, Oklahoma. It is a part of the 45th Infantry Brigade Combat Team, Oklahoma Army National Guard.

The 160th FA saw action during World War II and the Korean War as part of the 45th Infantry Division and again in Afghanistan and Iraq as part of the 45th Infantry Brigade.

== Subordinate units ==
- Headquarters and Headquarters Battery, 1-160th Field Artillery at Chandler, OK
- A Battery, 1-160th Field Artillery at Shawnee, OK
- B Battery, 1-160th Field Artillery at Holdenville, OK
- C Battery, 1-160th Field Artillery at Fort Sill, OK

Additionally, the 160th is supported by its Forward Support Company (FSC)

- F Company, 700th Brigade Support Battalion at Chandler, OK

== Deployments ==
WW II; (45th Infantry Division)

Korea; (45th Infantry Division)

Global War on Terror Kuwait (45th Infantry Brigade)

- Afghanistan, Consolidation I (45th Infantry Brigade)
- Iraq Surge (45th Infantry Brigade)
- Iraq Current (unnamed)

New Orleans (Hurricane Katrina/Rita) (45th Infantry Brigade)

== History ==
Lieutenant Colonel William S. Key, newly discharged from the U.S. Army following World War I, was appointed a captain of field artillery in the Oklahoma National Guard. He was directed to organize a light (75 mm) artillery battery at Wewoka, Oklahoma. Battery A was federally recognized as Battery A, 1st Oklahoma Field Artillery, on 28 July 1920. Battery A became known as the "White Horse Battery" in recognition of the white horses it used to tow its artillery pieces. On 18 July 1921, the 1st Oklahoma Field Artillery Regiment, consisting of a regimental headquarters and two firing battalions, incorporating the White Horse Battery and other subsequently established artillery units, was federally recognized. The 1st Oklahoma Field Artillery became the 160th Field Artillery Regiment on 10 October 1921, and was assigned to the 45th Infantry Division. The regiment converted from horse drawn to truck drawn on 2 August 1933. The regimental headquarters was relocated on 1 July 1929 to Tulsa, Oklahoma. The regiment conducted annual summer training at Fort Sill, Oklahoma.

The 160th Field Artillery Regiment was disbanded in 1942 when the division was "triangularized" and 1st Battalion became the 160th Field Artillery Battalion, while the 2nd Battalion was renamed the 171st Artillery Battalion. The 160th FA saw action in both World War II and Korea. Thirty-six of its soldiers were killed during the Second World War. During World War II the 160th FA normally operated in support of the 179th Infantry Regiment and would support the 279th Infantry during the Korean War.

== Lineage and honors ==
=== Lineage ===
- Constituted in 1920 in the Oklahoma National Guard as the 1st Regiment of Oklahoma Field Artillery.
- Redesignated 10 October 1921 as the 160th Field Artillery and assigned to the 45th Division.
- Organized and Federally recognized 22 November 1921 with headquarters at Tulsa.
- Inducted into Federal service 16 September 1940 at home stations.
- Regiment broken up 11 February 1942 and its elements reorganized and redesignated as follows:

- Headquarters and Headquarters Battery disbanded;
- 2d Battalion as the 171st Field Artillery Battalion, an element of the 45th infantry Division (remainder of regiment—hereafter separate lineages).
- 171st Field artillery Battalion inactivated 24 November 1945 at Camp Bowie, Texas. Redesignated 12 June 1946 as the 160th Field Artillery Battalion, an element of the 45th Infantry Division.

- Consolidated 19 September 1946 with headquarters, 160th Field artillery (reconstituted 28 August 1945 in the Oklahoma National Guard), and consolidated unit reorganized and Federally recognized as the 160th Field Artillery Battalion with headquarters at Tulsa.
- Ordered into active Federal service 1 September 1950 at home stations.

(160th Field Artillery Battalion [NGUS] organized and Federally recognized 14 October 1952 with headquarters at Chandler.)

- Released 30 April 1954 from active Federal service and reverted to state control; Federal recognition concurrently withdrawn from the 160th Field Artillery Battalion (NGUS).
- Reorganized and redesignated 1 May 1959 as the 160th Artillery, a parent regiment under the Combat Arms Regimental System, to consist of the 1st and 2d Howitzer Battalions, elements of the 45th Infantry Division.
- Reorganized 1 April 1963 to consist of the 1st Battalion, an element of the 45th Infantry Division.
- Reorganized 1 February 1968 to consist of the 1st Battalion, an element of the 45th Infantry Brigade.
- Withdrawn 1 June 1989 from the Combat arms regimental System and reorganized under the United States Army Regimental System.

=== Campaign participation credit ===
- World War II: Sicily (with arrowhead); Naples-Foggia; Anzio; Rome-Arno; Southern France (with arrowhead); Rhineland; Ardennes-Alsace; Central Europe
- Korean War: Second Korean Winter; Korea, Summer–Fall 1952; Third Korean Winter; Korea, Summer 1953

Global War on Terror
Operation Enduring Freedom

- Afghanistan, Consolidation I

Operation Iraqi Freedom

- Iraq Surge

Operation New Dawn

- Iraq Current Campaign (unnamed)

=== Decorations ===
- Meritorious Unit Commendation (Army)
- Army Superior Unit Award
- French Croix de Guerre with Palm, World War II, Streamer embroidered ACQUAFONDATA (171st Field Artillery Battalion cited; DA GO 43, 1950)
- Republic of Korea Presidential Unit Citation, Streamer embroidered Korea 1951–1953 (160th Field Artillery Battalion cited; DA GO 30, 1954)

Battery B (Seminole), 1st Battalion, additionally entitled to:
- Meritorious Unit Commendation (Army), Streamer embroidered Korea 1953 (120th Engineer Combat Battalion cited; DA GO 22, 1954)

== Distinctive unit insignia ==
Description A gold color metal and enamel device 1 3/8 inches (3.5 cm) in height overall consisting of the shield, crest and motto of the coat of arms.

Symbolism The shield is scarlet and yellow for Artillery. The dividing line represents the Red River; the projectile in chief, the Artillery fire; and the bezant in base, the clean cut hits made by the 160th Field Artillery Regiment.

Background The distinctive unit insignia was originally approved for the 160th Field Artillery Regiment on 30 March 1927. It was redesignated for the 160th Field Artillery Battalion on 2 December 1942. It was redesignated for the 171st Field Artillery Battalion on 30 June 1955. The insignia was redesignated for the 160th Artillery Regiment on 18 October 1960. On 19 July 1972, the insignia was redesignated for the 160th Field Artillery Regiment.
