= 279th Infantry Regiment =

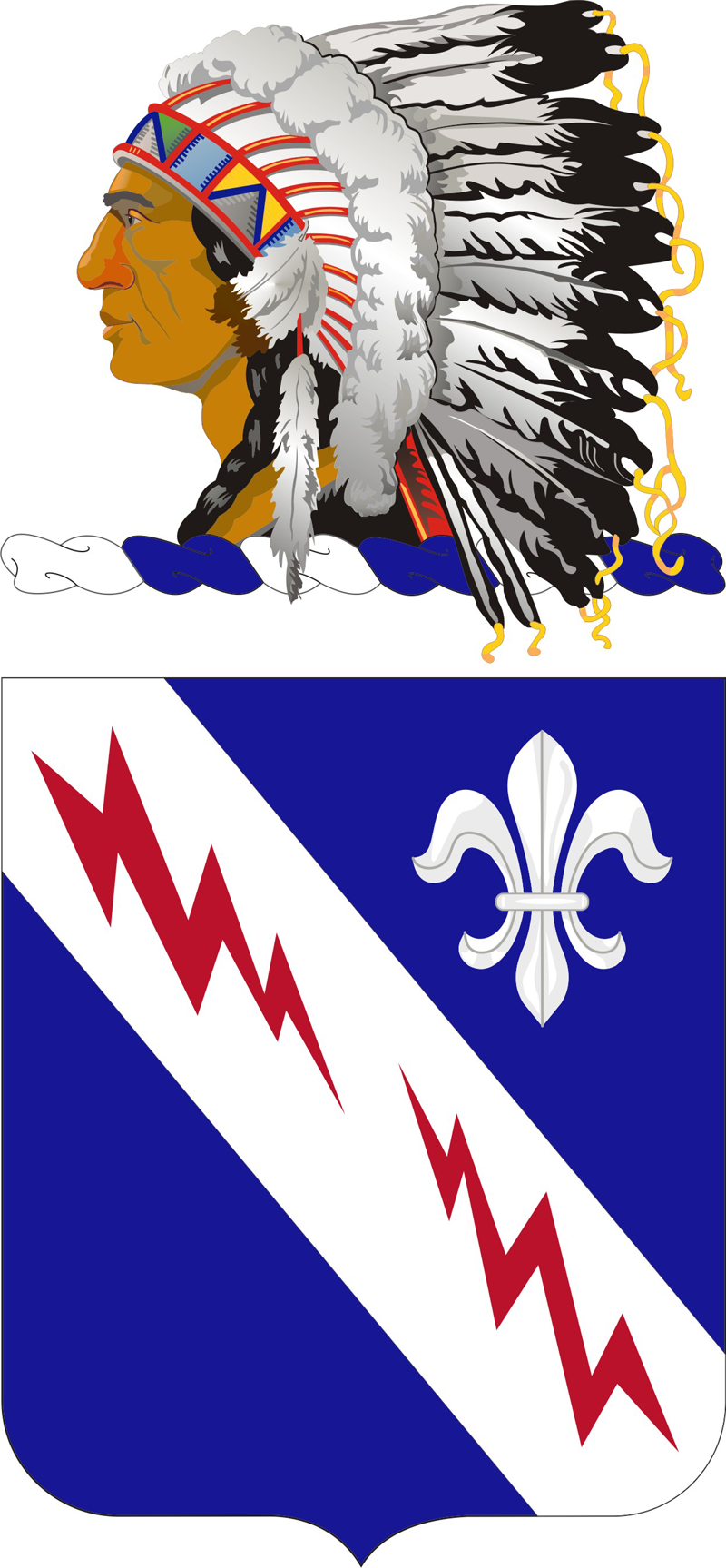
- Coat of arms
- Active: 1946
- Country: United States
- Branch: Oklahoma Army National Guard
- Type: Infantry
- Role: Light infantry
- Size: One battalion
- Garrison/HQ: Sand Springs, OK
- Motto: "Movin' On"
- Colors: Blue, white, red

Insignia
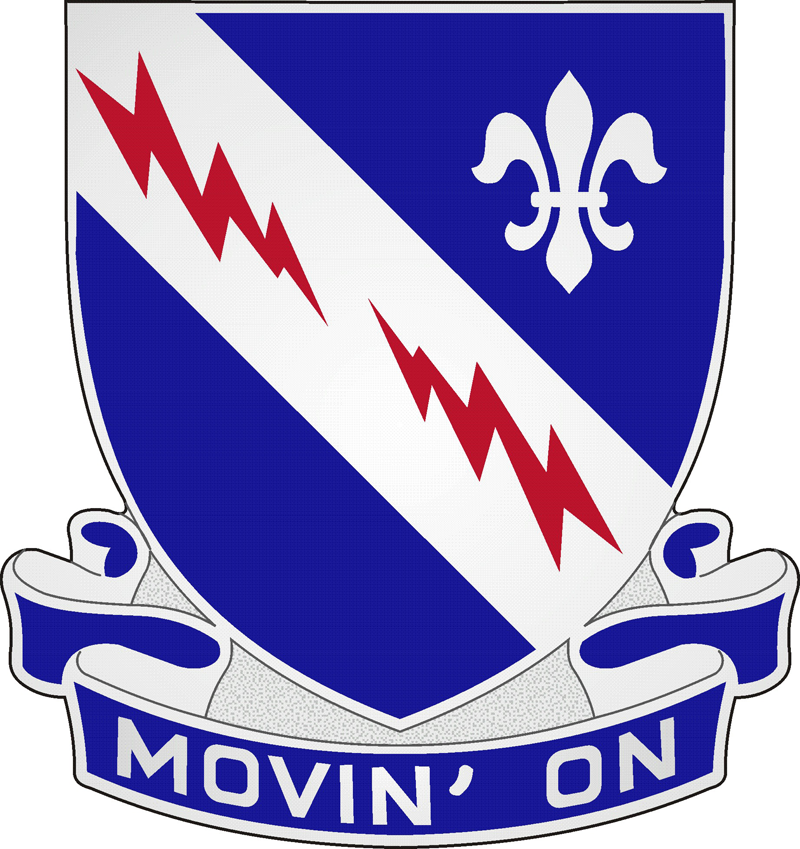
- Distinctive unit insignia

The 1st Battalion, 279th Infantry Regiment is headquartered in Sand Springs, Oklahoma. It is a part of the 45th Infantry Brigade Combat Team, Oklahoma Army National Guard.

The 279th Infantry shares a portion of its lineage with the 180th Infantry Regiment. The unit, under these two designations, saw action during World War II and the Korean War as part of the 45th Infantry Division and again in Afghanistan and Iraq as part of the 45th Infantry Brigade Combat Team.

== Lineage ==
=== Shared lineage with the 180th Infantry Regiment ===
Parent unit constituted in 1890 in the Oklahoma Volunteer Militia as the 1st Infantry Regiment.

(Oklahoma Volunteer Militia redesignated in 1895 as the Oklahoma National Guard.)

Organized 21 December 1895 from existing units with headquarters at Guthrie.

Consolidated with elements from Arizona, New Mexico, and the Indian Territory and mustered into federal service 4–23 July 1898 as the 1st Territorial Volunteer Infantry; mustered out of federal service 11–15 February 1899 at Albany, Georgia.

Former 1st infantry Regiment reorganized in 1899 in the Oklahoma National Guard as the 1st Infantry with headquarters at Guthrie.

Mustered into federal service 27 June - 1 July 1916 at Fort Sill, Oklahoma; mustered out of federal service 1 March 1917 at Fort Sill, Oklahoma.

Mustered into federal service 5 August 1917 at Fort Sill, Oklahoma; concurrently, drafted into federal service.

Consolidated 15 October 1917 with the 7th Infantry, Texas National Guard; consolidated unit concurrently reorganized and redesignated as the 142d Infantry and assigned to the 36th Division.

Demobilized 17 June 1919 at Camp Bowie, Texas.

Elements of the former 1st Infantry in eastern Oklahoma consolidated 1920–1921 with elements of the 3d Infantry (organized and federally recognized 3 September 1918 in the Oklahoma National Guard with headquarters at Muskogee) and consolidated unit designated as the 3d Infantry (elements of the former 1st Infantry in central Oklahoma consolidated with the 2d Infantry - hereafter separate lineage.)

Redesignated 14 October 1921 as the 180th Infantry and assigned to the 45th Division.

Inducted into federal service 16 September 1940 at home stations.

(45th Division redesignated 11 February 1942 as the 45th Infantry Division.)

Inactivated 22–29 November 1945 at Camp Bowie, Texas.

=== New separate lineage ===
Former elements of the 180th Infantry in northeastern Oklahoma were reorganized and federally recognized on 20 September 1946 as the 279th Infantry, with headquarters at Okmulgee. Former elements of the 180th Infantry in southeastern Oklahoma were reorganized as the 180th Infantry – hereafter a separate lineage.

Ordered into active federal service 1 September 1950 at home stations.

(279th Infantry [NGUS] organized and federally recognized 30 October 1952 with headquarters at Okmulgee.)

Released 30 April 1954 from active federal service and reverted to state control; federal recognition concurrently withdrawn from the 279th Infantry (NGUS).

Reorganized 1 May 1959 as a parent regiment under the Combat Arms Regimental System to consist of the 1st Battle Group, an element of the 45th Infantry Division.

Reorganized 1 April 1963 to consist of the 1st and 2d Battalions, elements of the 45th Infantry Division.

Reorganized 1 February 1968 to consist of the 1st Battalion, an element of the 45th Infantry Brigade.

Withdrawn 1 May 1989 from the Combat Arms Regimental System and reorganized under the United States Army Regimental System.

Reorganized 1 November 2005 to consist of the 1st Battalion, an element of the 45th Infantry Brigade.

(1st Battalion ordered into active federal service 20 January 2004 at home stations; released from active federal service 17 July 2005 and reverted to state control.)

Redesignated 1 October 2005 as the 279th Infantry Regiment.

(1st Battalion ordered into active federal service 19 October 2007 at home stations.)

Converted and redesignated 1 September 2008 as the 279th Cavalry Regiment.

(1st Squadron released from active federal service 21 November 2008 and reverted to state control.)

Converted and redesignated 1 December 2008 as the 279th Infantry Regiment.

(1st Battalion ordered into active federal service 31 March 2011 at home stations; released from active federal service 3 May 2012 and reverted to state control.)

== Current units ==
Headquarters and Headquarters Company, 1-279th Infantry at Sand Springs with Detachment at Bartlesville

- A Company, 1-279th Infantry at Sand Springs
- B Company, 1-279th Infantry at Vinita
- C Company, 1-279th Infantry at Broken Arrow
- D Company, 1-279th Infantry at Claremore

Additionally, the 279th is supported by its Forward Support Company (FSC)

- G Co., 700th Brigade Support Battalion at Sand Springs, OK with Detachment at Broken Arrow

== Campaign streamers ==
World War II

- Sicily, W/Arrowhead
- Naples-Foggia W/Arrowhead
- Anzio
- RomeArno
- S. France W/Arrowhead
- Rhineland
- Ardennes-Alsace
- Central Europe

Co D additionally entitled to:

- Northern Solomons
- Luzon

Korea

- Second Korean Winter
- Korea, Summer/Fall 1952
- Third Korean Winter
- Korea, Summer 1953

Global War on Terror
Operation Enduring Freedom

- Afghanistan, Consolidation I
- Afghanistan, Consolidation III
- Afghanistan, Transition I

Co D additionally entitled to:
Operation Iraqi Freedom

- Iraq Surge

=== Battlefield or campaign honors, citations and decorations ===
- Meritorious Unit Commendation (Army), Streamer embroidered IRAQ 2008.
- Meritorious Unit Commendation (Army), Streamer embroidered AFGHANISTAN 2011–2012.
- French Croix de Guerre with Palm, World War II, Streamer embroidered ACQUAFONDATA.
- Republic of Korea Presidential Unit Citation, Streamer embroidered KOREA 1951–1952.
- Republic of Korea Presidential Unit Citation, Streamer embroidered KOREA 1953.

Subordinate elements:

- Headquarters Company (Tulsa), 1st Battalion, additionally entitled to:
- Meritorious Unit Commendation (Army), Streamer embroidered EUROPEAN THEATER 1944.
- Meritorious Unit Commendation (Army), Streamer embroidered EUROPEAN THEATER 1944–1945.

Company D (Claremore), 1st Battalion, additionally entitled to:

- Philippine Presidential Unit Citation, Streamer embroidered 17 OCTOBER 1944 TO 4 JULY 1945.

== Distinctive unit insignia ==
Description A Silver color metal and enamel device 1 3/32 inches (2.8 cm) in height overall consisting of a shield blazoned: Azure, on a bend Argent two lightning bolts Gules, in chief a fleur-de-lis of the second. Attached below and to the sides of the shield is a Blue scroll inscribed "MOVIN’ ON" in Silver letters.

Background The distinctive unit insignia was originally approved for the 279th Infantry Regiment on 26 September 1952. It was redesignated effective 1 September 2007, for the 279th Cavalry Regiment with the symbolism revised. It was redesignated again, effective December 2008, for the 279th Infantry Regiment with the symbolism revised.

== Coat of arms ==
- Blazon
  - Shield: Azure, on a bend Argent two lightning bolts Gules, in chief a fleur-de-lis of the second.
  - Crest: That for the regiments and separate battalions of the Oklahoma Army National Guard: From a wreath Argent and Azure an Indian's head with war bonnet all Proper.
  - Motto: MOVIN’ ON.
- Symbolism: The colors blue and white are for the Infantry, the original unit designation. The white bend represents a baldric (sword sling), which is a mark of military honor. The fleur-de-lis symbolizes service in World War I. The lightning bolts allude to the swift striking force of the Infantry, and also present the Regiment's assault landings at Sicily and Southern France in World War II.
- Background: The coat of arms was originally approved for the 279th Infantry Regiment on 26 September 1952. It was redesignated effective 1 September 2007, for the 279th Cavalry Regiment with the symbolism updated.
