= 189th Regiment (United States) =

189th Regiment (Regional Training Institute)
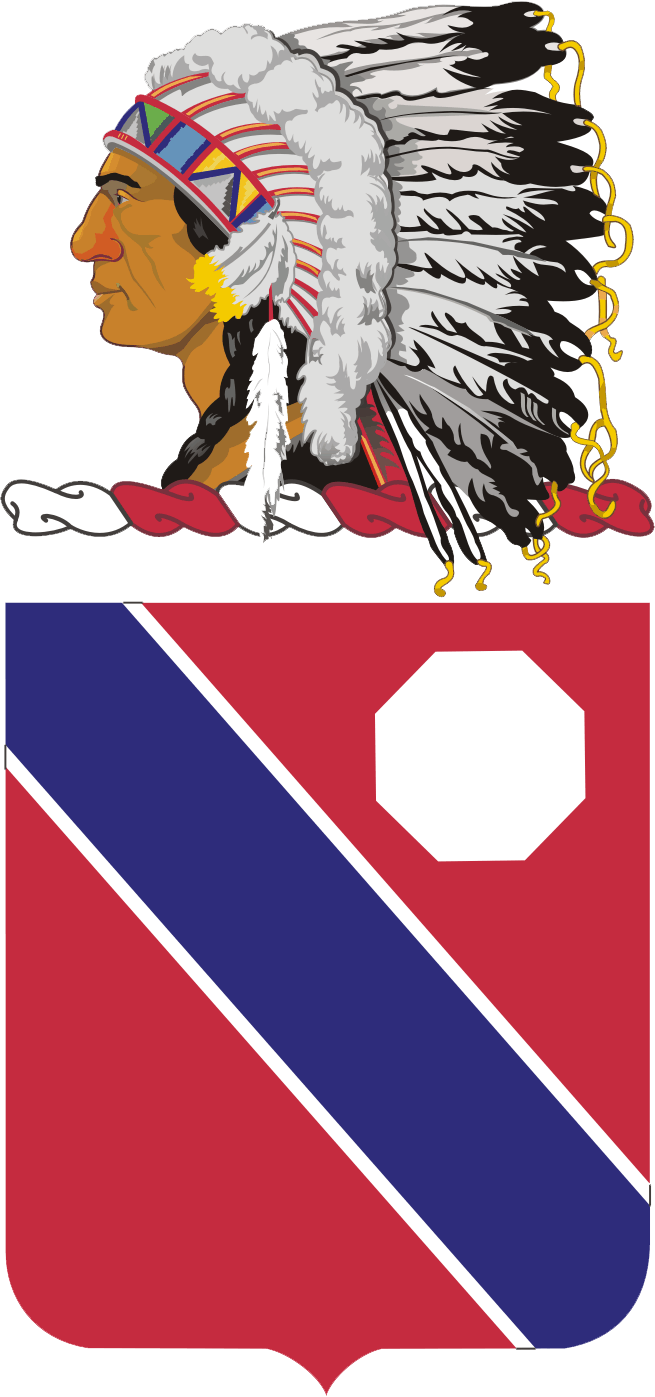
- Coat of arms
- Active: 1921
- Country: United States
- Allegiance: United States
- Branch: Oklahoma Army National Guard
- Type: Field Artillery and General Service
- Role: Regional Training Institute
- Size: 2 Battalions
- Garrison/HQ: Oklahoma City, OK
- Motto(s): "HONORIS CUSTOS" (The Guardian of Honor)
- Colors: Red, blue, and gold

Insignia
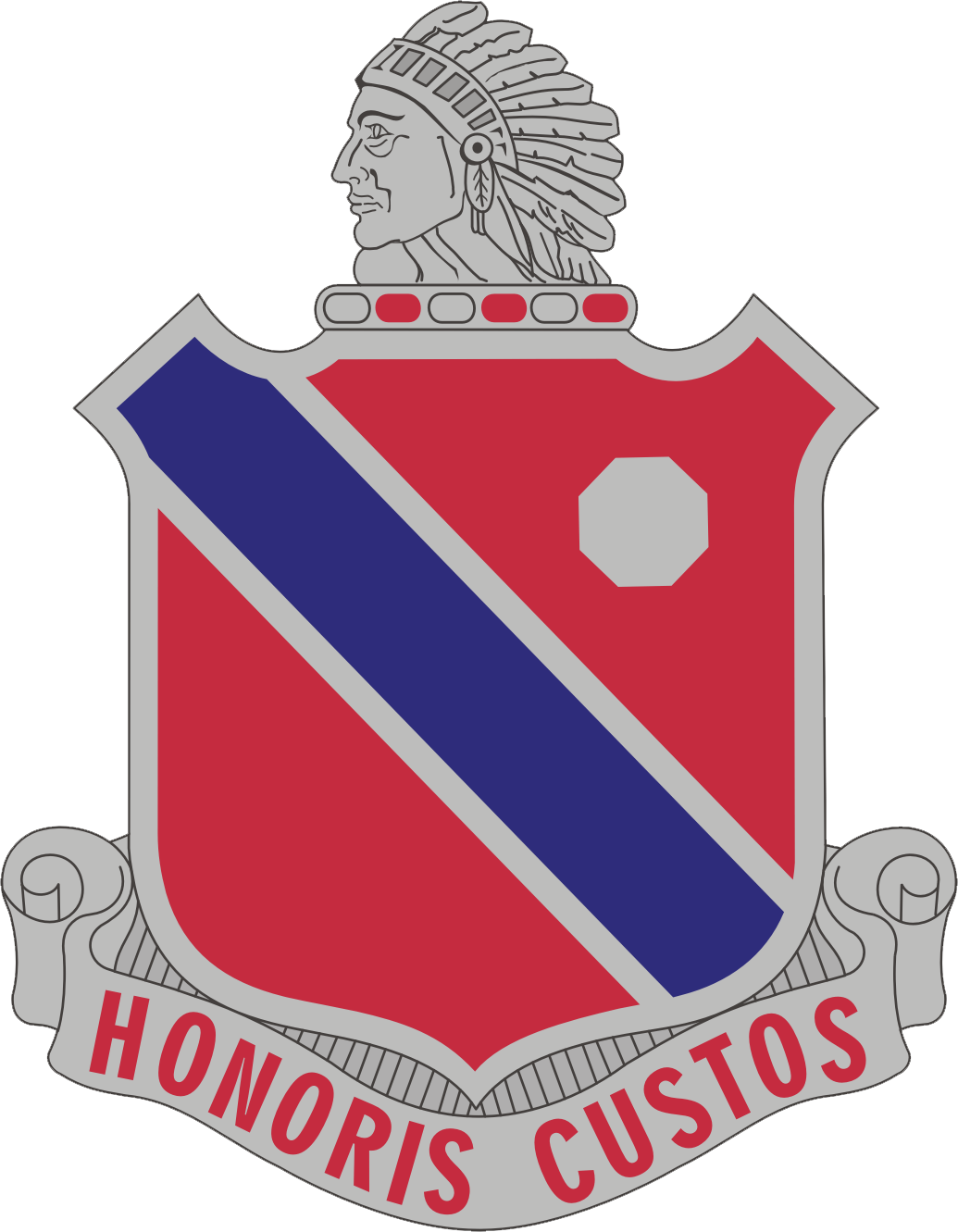
- Distinctive unit insignia

The 189th Regiment (Regional Training Institute) is a training regiment of the Oklahoma Army National Guard. The Regiment only retains its affiliation with the Field Artillery branch for purposes of history and lineage and is the core cadre and leadership of the Oklahoma Regional Training Institute (OKRTI). Its parent unit is the Joint Force Headquarters of the Oklahoma Army National Guard.

It today consists of 1st Battalion, 189th Field Artillery Regiment, and 2nd Battalion (General Services) Field Artillery Regiment which are headquartered in Oklahoma City, Oklahoma. It was a part of the 45th Infantry Division. The 189th FA saw action during World War II and the Korean War as part of the 45th infantry Division.

== History and lineage ==
The 189th Field Artillery Regiment was constituted in the National Guard in 1921, assigned to the 85th Field Artillery Brigade (VIII Corps), and allotted to the state of Oklahoma. It was organized and federally recognized on 14 October 1921 by the redesignation of the 2nd Field Artillery Regiment of the Oklahoma National Guard. It was reassigned to the 187th Field Artillery Brigade (VIII Corps) on 2 July 1923. In March 1930, the regiment was relieved from the 187th Field Artillery Brigade and assigned to the 45th Division. The 189th Field Artillery Regiment, consisting of two battalions of 155mm howitzers, truck drawn, was inducted into Federal service on 16 September 1940 and stationed at Fort Sill, Oklahoma. The 189th Field Artillery Regiment moved to Camp Barkeley, Texas on 6 March 1941. On 11 February 1942, the regiment split into two separate battalions, the 1st Battalion, 189th FA Regiment retained the number and remained with the 45th Division. The 2nd Battalion, 189th FA Regiment was redesignated as 202nd Field Artillery Regiment and was assigned to General Headquarters Reserve. The 202nd Field Artillery Regiment was further reorganized on 1 March 1943 when the 1st Battalion was redesignated as the independent 202nd Field Artillery Battalion and the 2nd Battalion became the 961st Field Artillery Battalion. The 189th fought in Sicily, Italy, France, and Germany during World War II, receiving the Presidential Unit Citation for action on the Salerno Beachhead. The battalion was recalled to active duty in 1950 with the 45th Infantry Division and fought in Korea.

The OKRTI today provides instruction in many areas, including, All Field Artillery courses, such as Field Artillery Military Occupational Specialty Qualification, Advanced Leaders Course, and Senior Leaders Course, Army Basic Instructor Course (ABIC), Combatives Training, Health Care Specialist (Combat Medic), Officer Candidate School (OCS), Small Group Instructor Training Course (SGITC), Platoon Trainer Qualification Course (PTQC), Weapons of Mass Destruction (WMD) Training and a number of online distance learning offerings as well.

== Distinctive unit insignia ==
Description A Silver color metal and enamel device 1 5/32 inches (2.9 cm) in height overall consisting of a shield blazoned: Gules, a bend Azure fimbriated Argent, in sinister chief an octagon of the like. Attached below the shield a Silver scroll inscribed "HONORIS CUSTOS" in Red letters.

Symbolism The service of the former organization, the 189th Field Artillery, is indicated by the red shield. The bend represents Federal recognition, the silver fimbriation to separate the two colors, and the octagon suggests the Eighth Corps.

Background The distinctive unit insignia was originally approved for the 189th Field Artillery, Oklahoma National Guard on 22 December 1925. It was redesignated for the 189th Field Artillery Battalion, Oklahoma National Guard on 7 October 1942. It was redesignated for the 189th Artillery, Oklahoma National Guard on 1 November 1960. It was amended to change the description on 27 November 1964. The insignia was redesignated for the 189th Field Artillery on 19 July 1972. The insignia was redesignated for the 189th Regiment, Oklahoma Army National Guard, with description and symbolism revised on 29 April 1997.

== Campaign participation credit ==
World War II

- Sicily, W/Arrowhead
- Naples-Foggia W/Arrowhead
- Anzio
- Rome-Arno
- S. France W/Arrowhead
- Rhineland
- Ardennes-Alsace
- Central Europe

Korea

- Second Korean Winter
- Korea, Summer/Fall 1952
- Third Korean Winter
- Korea, Summer 1953
