= Oklahoma Army National Guard =

Component of the US Army and military of the U.S. state of Oklahoma

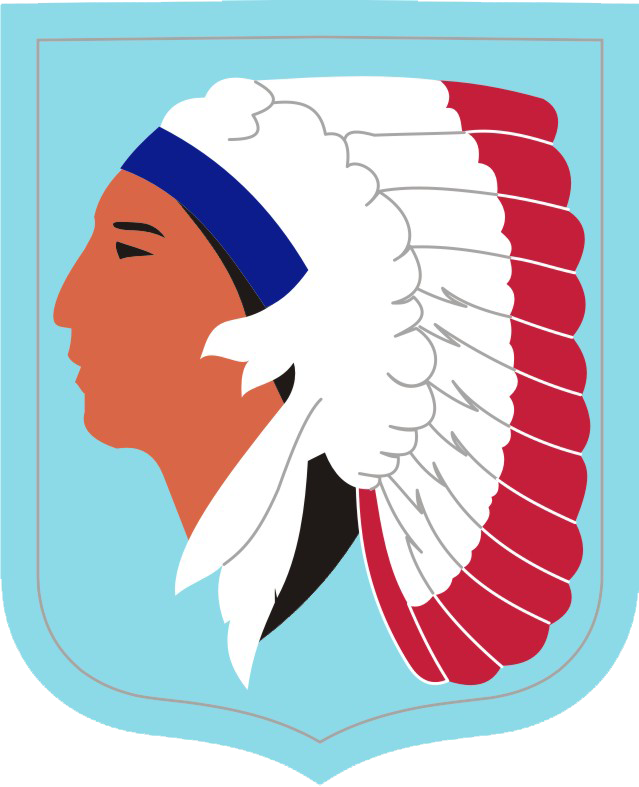
- Oklahoma Army National Guard STARC SSI
- Active: 1890-present
- Country: United States
- Allegiance: Oklahoma
- Branch: United States Army
- Role: United States Army National Guard
- Website: https://ok.ng.mil/

Commanders
- Current commander: Thomas H. Mancino
- Command Sergeant Major: CSM John Hernandez

Insignia
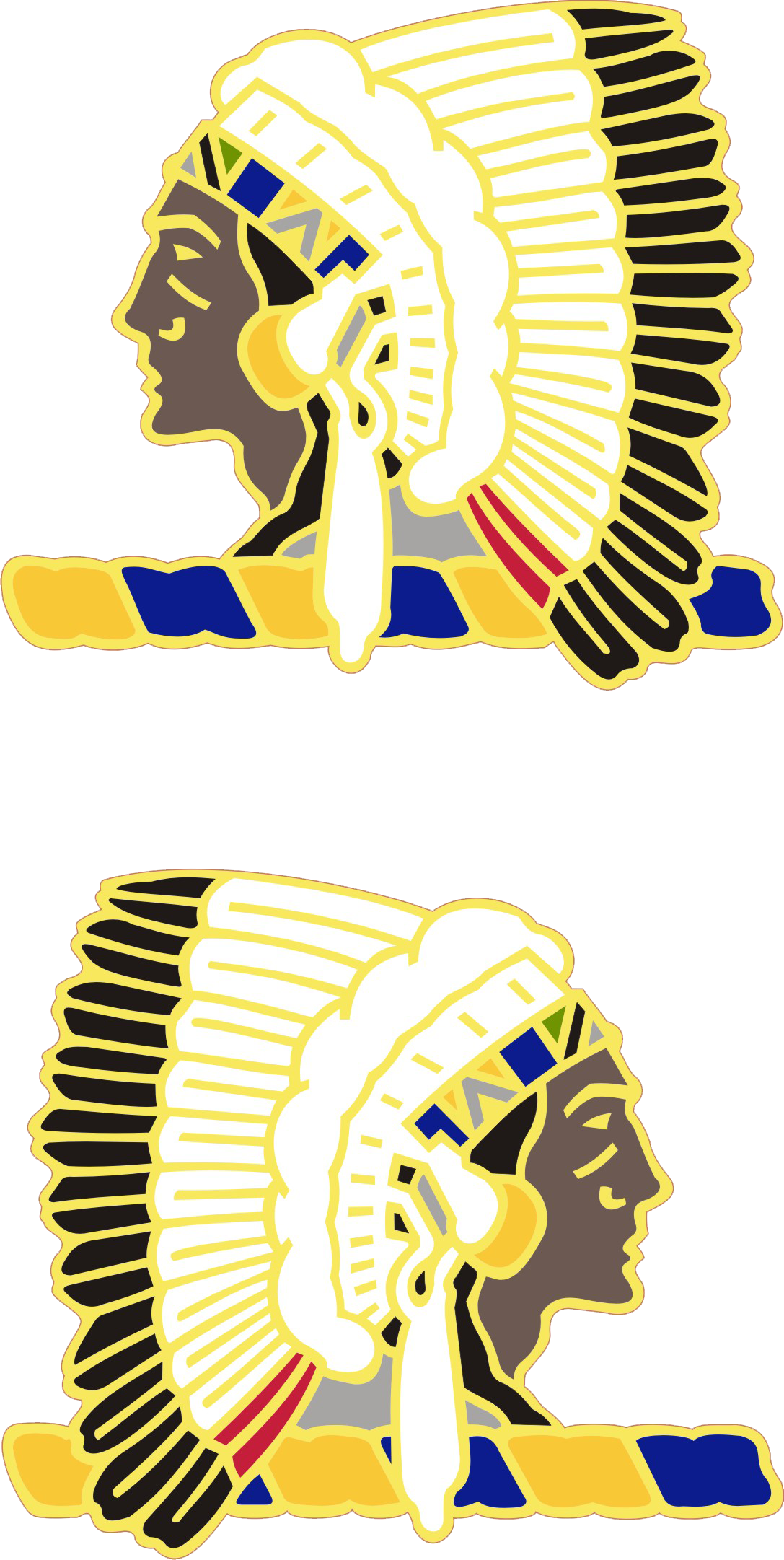
- Oklahoma Army National Guard STARC DUI

- Oklahoma Army National Guard Crest

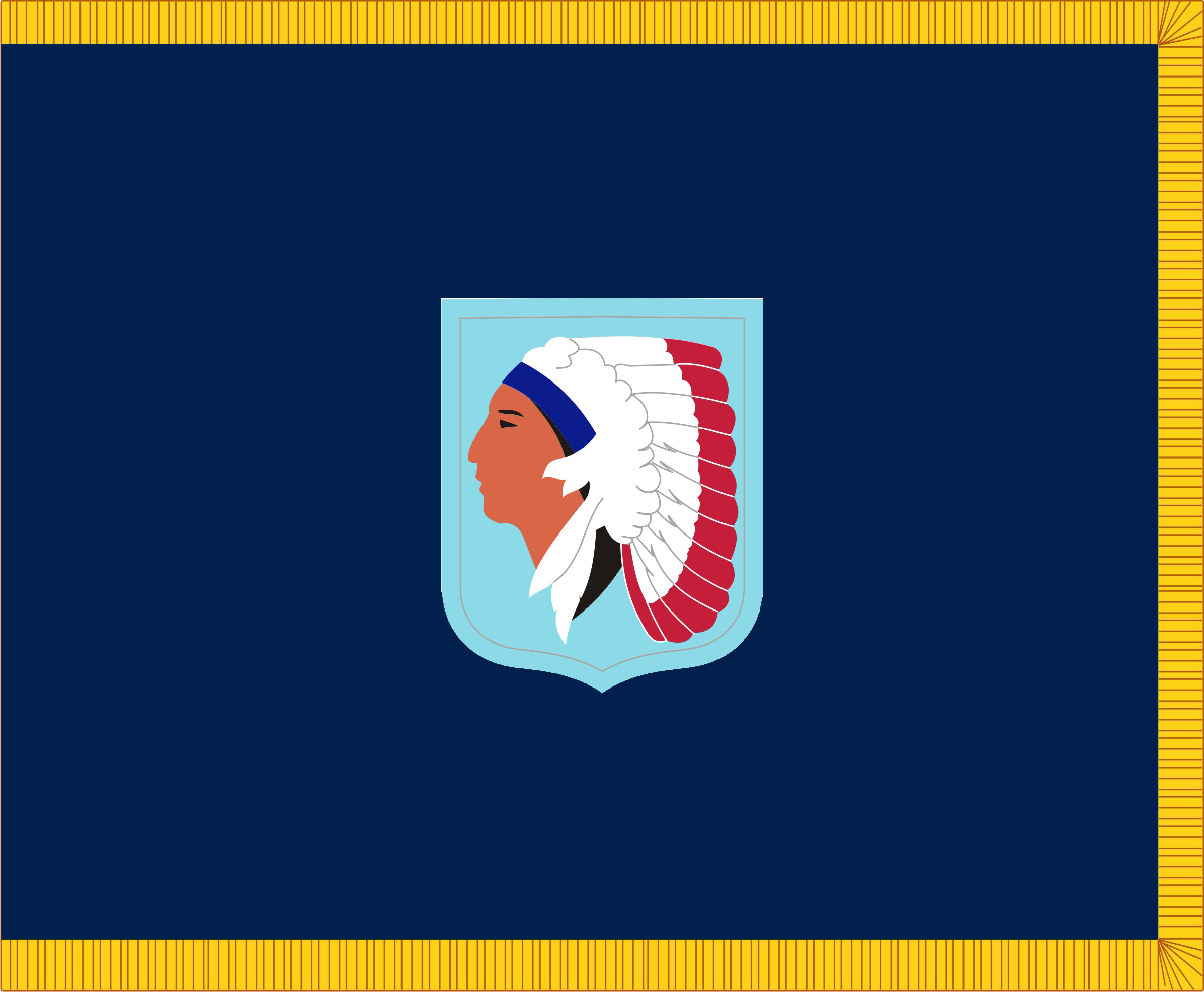
- Oklahoma Army National Guard Headquarters Flag

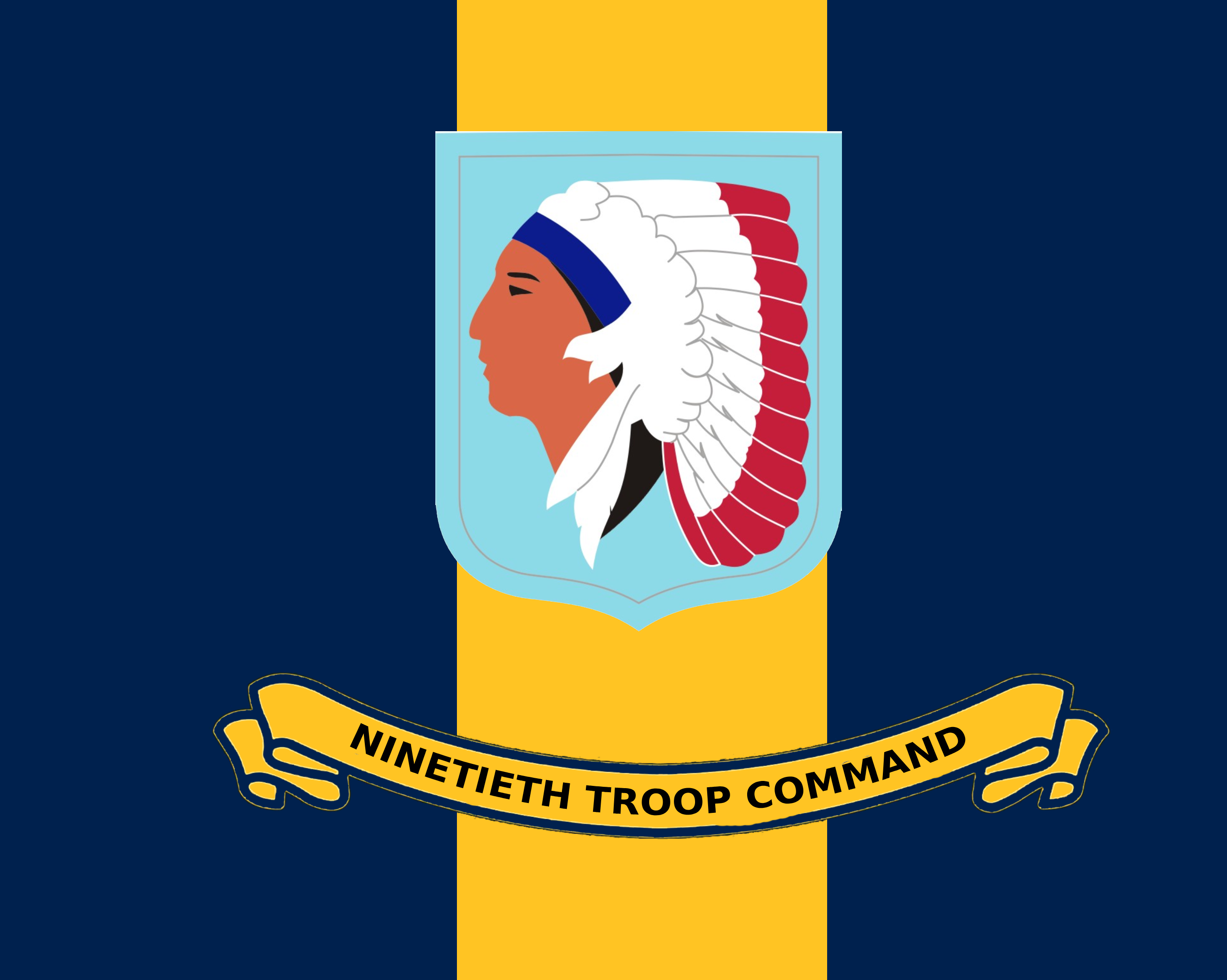
- Oklahoma Army National Guard 90th Troop Command Flag

- Oklahoma Army National Guard 90th Troop Command SSI

The Oklahoma Army National Guard is the Army National Guard component of the Oklahoma National Guard. The Commander-in-Chief of the Oklahoma National Guard is the governor of Oklahoma. He appoints the State Adjutant General (TAG) who is a Major General from either Army or Air. Currently, the TAG is Brig. Gen. Thomas H. Mancino. The previous TAG was Maj. Gen. Michael Thompson.

The history of the OK ARNG SOF aviation "Lords of Darkness" is complicated. Early aviation units in the OK ARNG appear to have included the 245th Medical Company (Air Ambulance) and the 145th Aviation Company (1968), seemingly amalgamated into the 445th Aviation Company (1971); the 445th Aviation Company was reorganized as Company B, 149th Aviation Battalion (September 1978); and in May 1982, the 45th Aviation Battalion (Light Combat Helicopter) was organised as a Special Operations Forces unit. Organizational Authority #168-87 (5 August 1987) reorganized the 45th Aviation Battalion as the 1st Battalion, 245th Aviation, as of 1 October 1987. On 5 August 1987, the 245th Aviation was constituted in the Oklahoma Army National Guard, a parent regiment under the United States Army Regimental System. It was organized on 1 October 1987 to consist of the 1st Battalion (Special Operations) (Airborne) at Sperry. The 1st Battalion relocated to Tulsa on 1 July 1989. In 1986-87 there was a struggle by the OK ARNG to be accepted as a Special Operations Aviation team member by Army Special Operations Command at Fort Bragg and the active Army's 160th Special Operations Aviation Regiment. It appears this process was successful since the unit flew 6,298 flying hours in 1992. However, this unit may have been deactivated in 1994.

At some point 1st Battalion, 245th Aviation (Special Operations) was reorganized into 1st Battalion (Airfield Operations), 245th Aviation. In January 2016 the unit prepared for deployment to the Middle East. Pre-deployment training was scheduled for May-June 2016 at the state training site, Camp Gruber.

== Units ==
The Oklahoma Army National Guard consists of the following elements:

- Joint Forces Command--Ground Component
  - 90th Troop Command
    - Headquarters, 90th Troop Command at Oklahoma City, Oklahoma
    - 120th Engineer Battalion at Broken Arrow, Oklahoma
      - Headquarters and Headquarters Company
      - Company A (Forward Support Company)
      - 3120th Engineer Company
      - 2120th Engineer Company
      - 1120th Engineer Detachment
      - 120th Medical Company (Area Support)
    - 345th Combat Sustainment Support Battalion
      - Headquarters and Headquarters Company
      - 1245th Transportation Company
      - 745th Military Police Company
      - Company A, 777th Aviation Support Battalion (Distribution), Okmulgee, Oklahoma
    - 63d Civil Support Team (WMD)
    - 145th Army Band
    - 145th Mobile Public Affairs Detachment
    - 2d Battalion, 245th Aviation Regiment
      - Headquarters and Headquarters Company
      - Company C
    - 3rd Battalion (Security & Support), 140th Aviation Regiment
      - Company C
        - Detachment 1
    - 2d Battalion (General Support), 149th Aviation Regiment
      - Company B (CH-47)
        - Detachment 1
    - 1st Battalion (General Support), 169th Aviation Regiment
      - Company C
        - Detachment 1
    - 2d Battalion, 238th Aviation Regiment
      - Company F
    - 834th Aviation Support Battalion
      - Company B
    - Medical Detachment
  - 45th Infantry Brigade Combat Team
    - 1st Squadron (RSTA), 180th Cavalry Regiment
    - 2nd Battalion, 134th Infantry Regiment (Airborne) (Nebraska Army National Guard)
    - 1st Battalion, 179th Infantry Regiment
    - 1st Battalion, 279th Infantry Regiment
    - 1st Battalion, 160th Field Artillery Regiment (105mm Towed)
    - 700th Brigade Support Battalion
    - 545th Brigade Engineer Battalion
  - 45th Field Artillery Brigade
    - Headquarters and Headquarters Battery
    - 1st Battalion, 158th Field Artillery Regiment (HIMARS)
    - 271st Brigade Support Battalion
    - 205th Signal Company (Network)
  - Oklahoma Regional Training Institute
    - 1st Battalion, 189th Field Artillery Regiment
    - 2d Battalion (General Support), 189th Field Artillery Regiment

The OKARNG controls the Camp Gruber Maneuver Training Center located near Braggs, Oklahoma.

== History ==
In 2021, the Oklahoma National Guard soldiers and Airmen helped to distribute food and water to citizens affected by Hurricane Ida.

=== Historic units ===
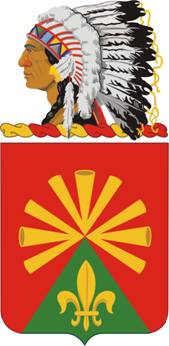
- 158th Field Artillery Regiment
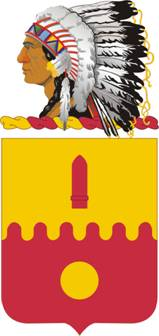
- 160th Field Artillery Regiment
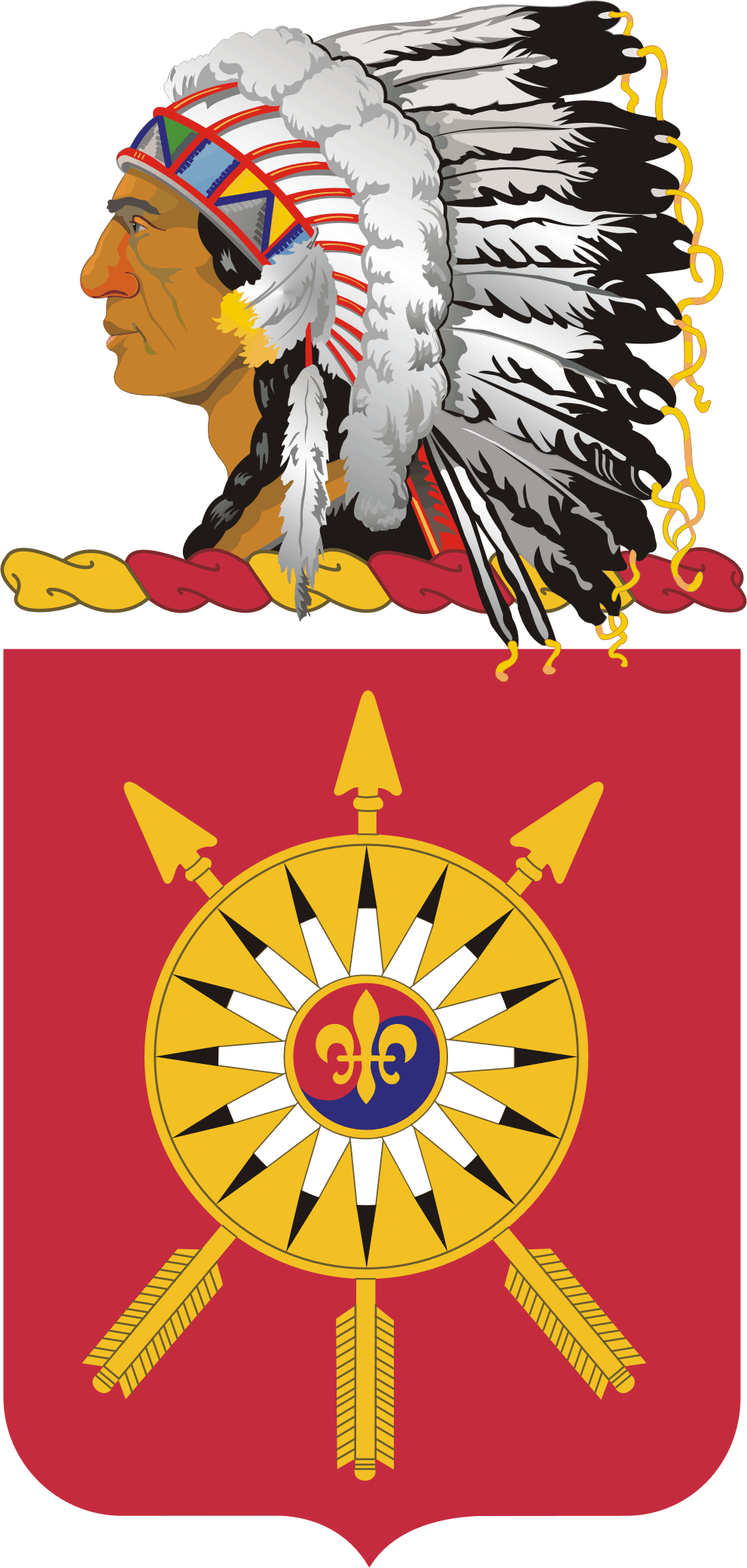
- 171st Field Artillery Regiment
- 189th Field Artillery Regiment
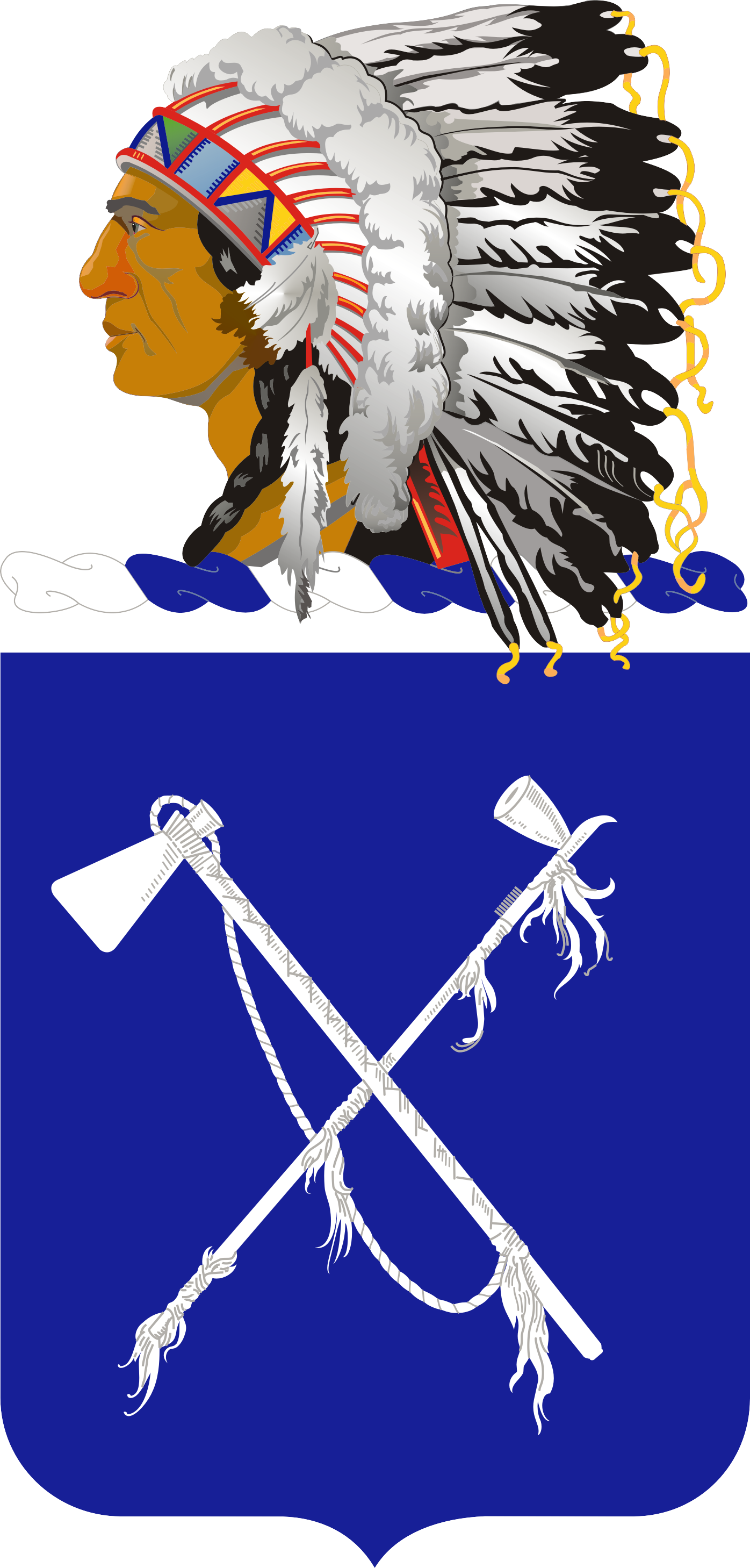
- 179th Infantry Regiment
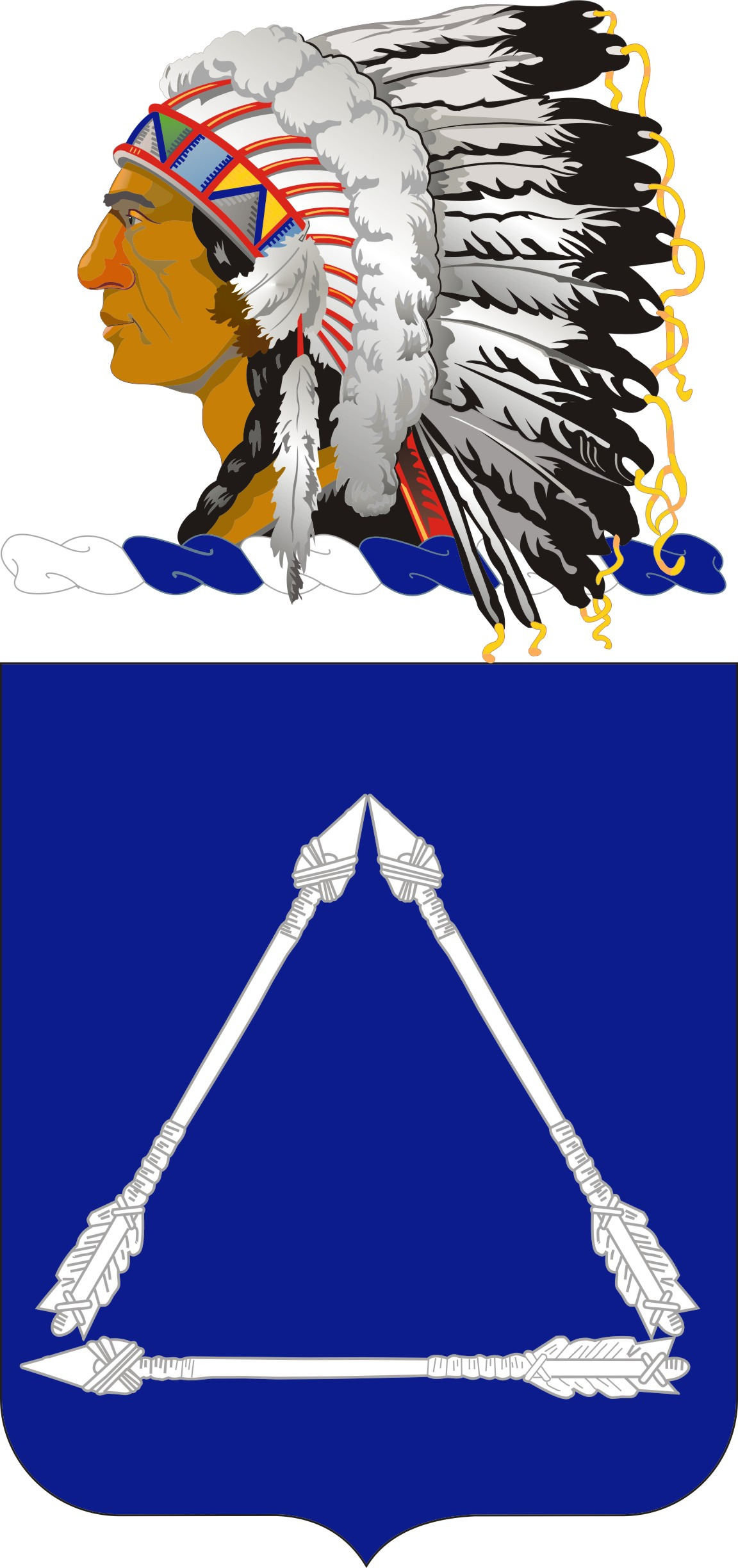
- 180th Infantry Regiment
