= 45th Infantry Brigade Combat Team =

Infantry brigade combat team of the United States Army

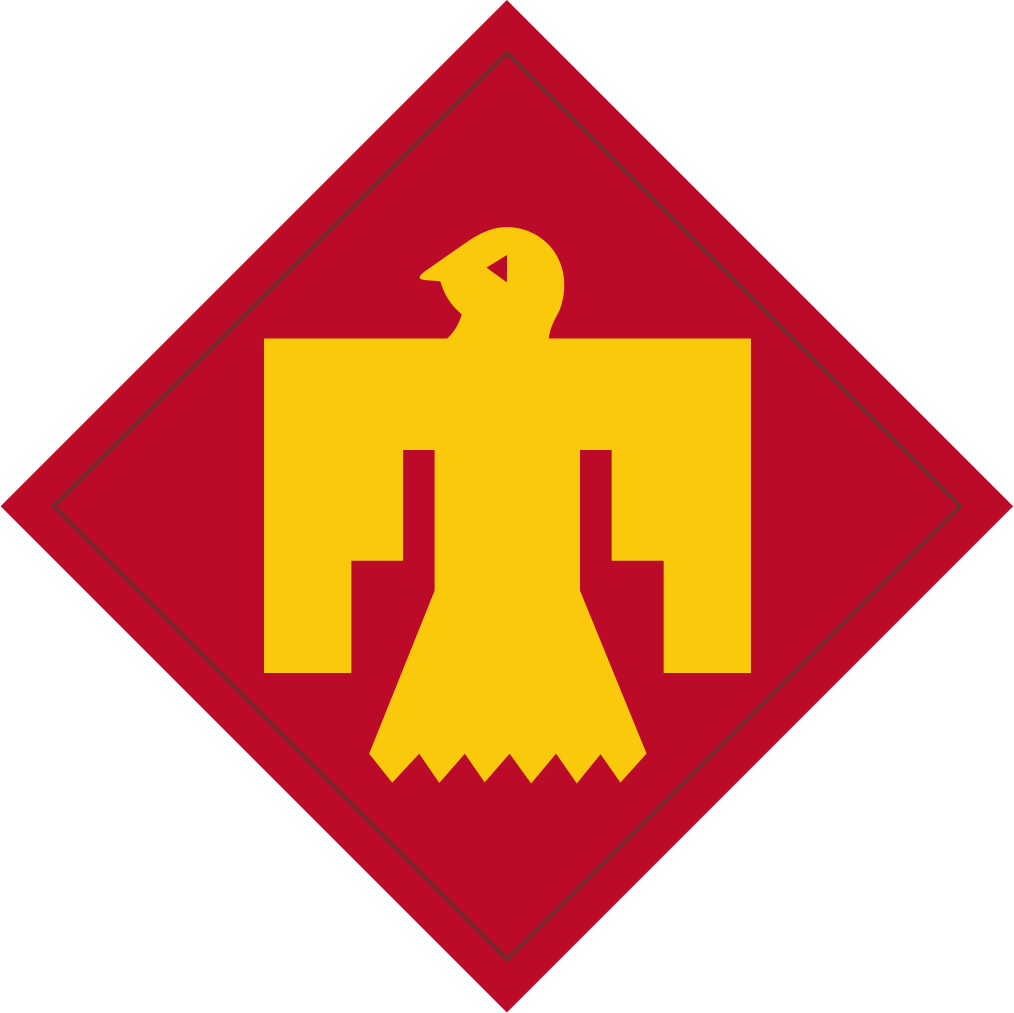
- Shoulder sleeve insignia
- Active: 1 February 1968–1 September 2008 (45th Infantry Bge.); 1 September 2008–present (45th IBCT)
- Country: United States Of America
- Branch: Oklahoma Army National Guard
- Type: Infantry brigade combat team
- Role: Light Infantry
- Part of: 35th Infantry Division (United States)
- Garrison/HQ: Norman, Oklahoma
- Nickname: Thunderbird (special designation)
- Mottos: Semper Anticus; Latin: "Always Forward"
- Engagements: Global War on Terrorism; Afghanistan; Iraq

Insignia
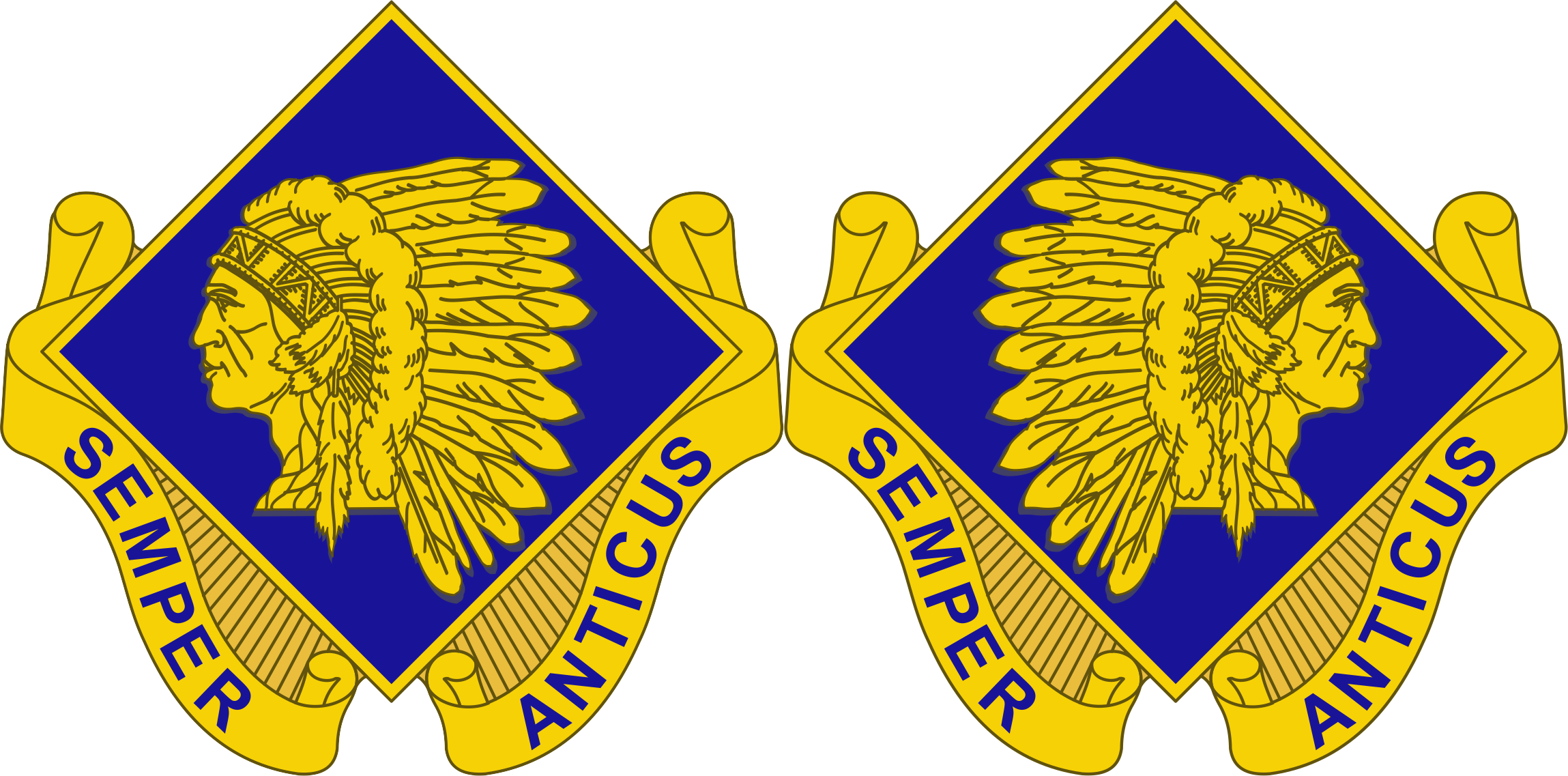
- Distinctive unit insignia

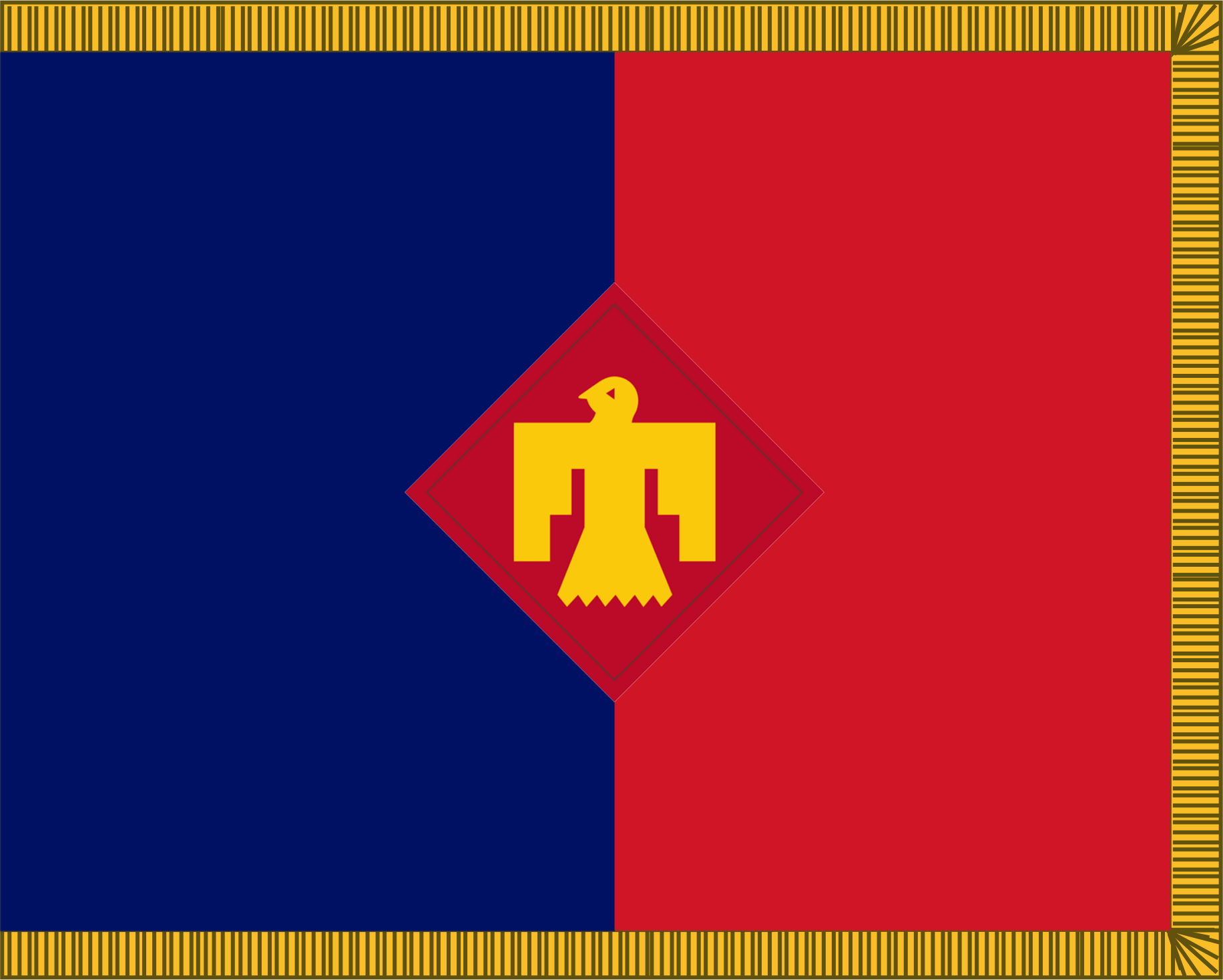
- 45th Infantry Brigade Flag

The 45th Infantry Brigade Combat Team ("Thunderbird") is a modular infantry brigade combat team of the United States Army headquartered in Norman, Oklahoma. It is a part of the Oklahoma Army National Guard.

The 45th Infantry Brigade was formed from existing elements of the disbanded 45th Infantry Division which had seen extensive action during World War II and the Korean War. The 45th Infantry Brigade was activated in 1968 and assigned to training duties for active duty army units until 1994 when the 45th was selected as one of 15 Separate Enhanced Infantry Brigades. In 1999, the brigade deployed two companies as part of the NATO Stabilization Force in the wake of the Bosnian War. In 2003, A/1-179th Infantry deployed to Saudi Arabia while B/1-179th deployed to Kuwait to provide security for Patriot missile sites. During the invasion of Iraq, B/Company 1–179th pushed North of Baghdad establishing a foothold in Taji, Iraq. Later that year, the 45th Infantry Brigade deployed to Afghanistan to train soldiers of the Afghan National Army which was followed by another brigade deployment to Iraq, in 2007, to assist in turning over of American military bases to Iraqi forces. A third brigade deployment to Afghanistan in 2011, saw the brigade assigned full-spectrum operations for the first time since the 1950s.

The brigade received all heraldry, lineage and honors from the 45th Infantry Division, including its shoulder sleeve insignia and campaign streamers for combat in World War II and Korea. It is the last brigade in the Army inventory that has a diamond-shaped shoulder sleeve insignia. Since 1999, the 45th Infantry Brigade has since received several of its own decorations for participation in Operation Enduring Freedom and Operation Iraqi Freedom.

== 45th Infantry Division ==
The history of the 45th Brigade Combat Team can be traced back to 1890 with the formation of the Militia of the Territory of Oklahoma. That militia was mobilized in 1898 during the Spanish–American War but never deployed. In 1916 the First Oklahoma Infantry Regiment deployed for border security duty during the Mexican Border Conflict. In 1917, the First Oklahoma Infantry Regiment, reassigned as part of the 142nd Infantry Regiment of the 36th Division fought in the final month of World War I.

On 19 October 1920, the Oklahoma State militia was organized as part of the 45th Infantry Division along with troops from Arizona, Colorado, and New Mexico. The division was organized and federally recognized as a US Army unit on 3 August 1923 in Oklahoma City, Oklahoma. Prior to World War II, the division was called on many times to maintain order in times of disaster and to keep peace during periods of political unrest. Oklahoma Governor John C. Walton used division troops to prevent the State Legislature from meeting when they were preparing to impeach him in 1923. Governor William H. Murray called out the guard several times during the depression to close banks, distribute food and once to force the State of Texas to keep open a free bridge over the Red River which Texas intended to collect tolls for, even after federal courts ordered the bridge not be opened.

The division would go on to see combat in World War II. The division was active for over five years, participating in eight campaigns, four amphibious assaults, for a total of 511 days of combat. Following World War II the division became an all-Oklahoma organization. In 1950, the division was also called into service during the Korean War, as one of four national guard divisions active during the war. The Division participated in four campaigns and sustained continuous combat operations for 429 days.

== Cold War years (1968–2001) ==
Units of the 45th Infantry Brigade (Separate), 1968–1994

- Headquarters and Headquarters Company 45th Infantry Brigade
- 1st Battalion 179th Infantry
- 1st Battalion 180th Infantry
- 1st Battalion 279th Infantry
- 1st Battalion 160th Field Artillery
- 700th Forward Support Battalion
- Troop E 145th Cavalry
- 245th Military Intelligence Company
- 245th Engineer Company

In 1968, the division was disbanded and the 45th Infantry Brigade (Separate) was formed in its place. The 45th Brigade assumed all of the 45th Division's lineage and campaign participation credit, including its shoulder sleeve insignia featuring a Thunderbird, a common Native American symbol, as a tribute to the south-western United States region which had a large population of Native Americans. The brigade also assumed the division's nickname, "Thunderbirds". The division's three subordinate brigades were disbanded as a part of the organization, and were not affiliated with the 45th Infantry Brigade (Separate). The brigade's headquarters was subsequently relocated to Edmond, Oklahoma. In 1971 the brigade received its distinctive unit insignia.

The brigade did not participate in any overseas combat operations through the 1970s or 1980s, as the size of the active duty force negated the need for National Guard formations to be deployed during the relatively small contingencies of that period. However, the 45th did participate in REFORGER (Certain Strike) in September 1987. The brigade was primarily used to train active duty units and other general peacetime missions within the United States. In 1991, the brigade became affiliated with the 1st Cavalry Division, providing training services for the division soldiers.

== Separate Infantry Brigade (Enhanced) (1994–2006) ==
Units of the 45th Separate Infantry Brigade (Enhanced), 1994–2006

- Headquarters and Headquarters Company 45th Infantry Brigade
- 1st Battalion, 179th Infantry
- 1st Battalion, 180th Infantry
- 1st Battalion, 279th Infantry
- 1st Battalion, 160th Field Artillery
- 700th Forward Support Battalion
- Troop E, 145th Cavalry
- 245th Military Intelligence Company
- 245th Engineer Company
- Battery E, 202d Air Defense Artillery (ILARNG) (1994–2000)

In 1994, the brigade was selected as one of fifteen "enhanced" separate brigades of the Army National Guard, featuring authorization to recruit 10% above required manning levels, a requirement to attend one of the Combat Training Centers not less than once every eight years, and ready to deploy within 90 days in case of emergencies. In 1997, the brigade was integrated under the command structure of the 7th Infantry Division (which also included the 39th Infantry Brigade-Arkansas and the 41st Infantry Brigade-Oregon) allowing the 7th Infantry Division to provide training assistance and support for the brigade's activities should it be deployed, and potentially command and control when deployed, but that was never tested. In 1996, the brigade's garrison was relocated back to Oklahoma City.

In 1999, approximately 250 soldiers of the brigade were deployed to Bosnia in support of NATO forces seeking to stabilize the country in the wake of the Bosnian War. Soldiers of the brigade were among the first National Guard units to see front-line patrolling duty in the conflict, a job held exclusively by active duty units until that time.

The brigade trained for a rotation in the Joint Readiness Training Center at Fort Polk, Louisiana throughout 2000 and 2001, before deploying to the center in June 2002. The brigade received praise from the JRTC exercise commander, 7th Infantry Brigade Commander, Major General Edward Soriano, and the United States Army Chief of Staff, General Eric Shinseki, as performing the mission better than many brigades before it. The 45th Infantry Brigade's performance at the Joint Readiness Training Center laid the groundwork for securing the first national guard infantry brigade deployment to a combat zone since the Korean War.

== Iraq and Afghanistan (2001–2021) ==
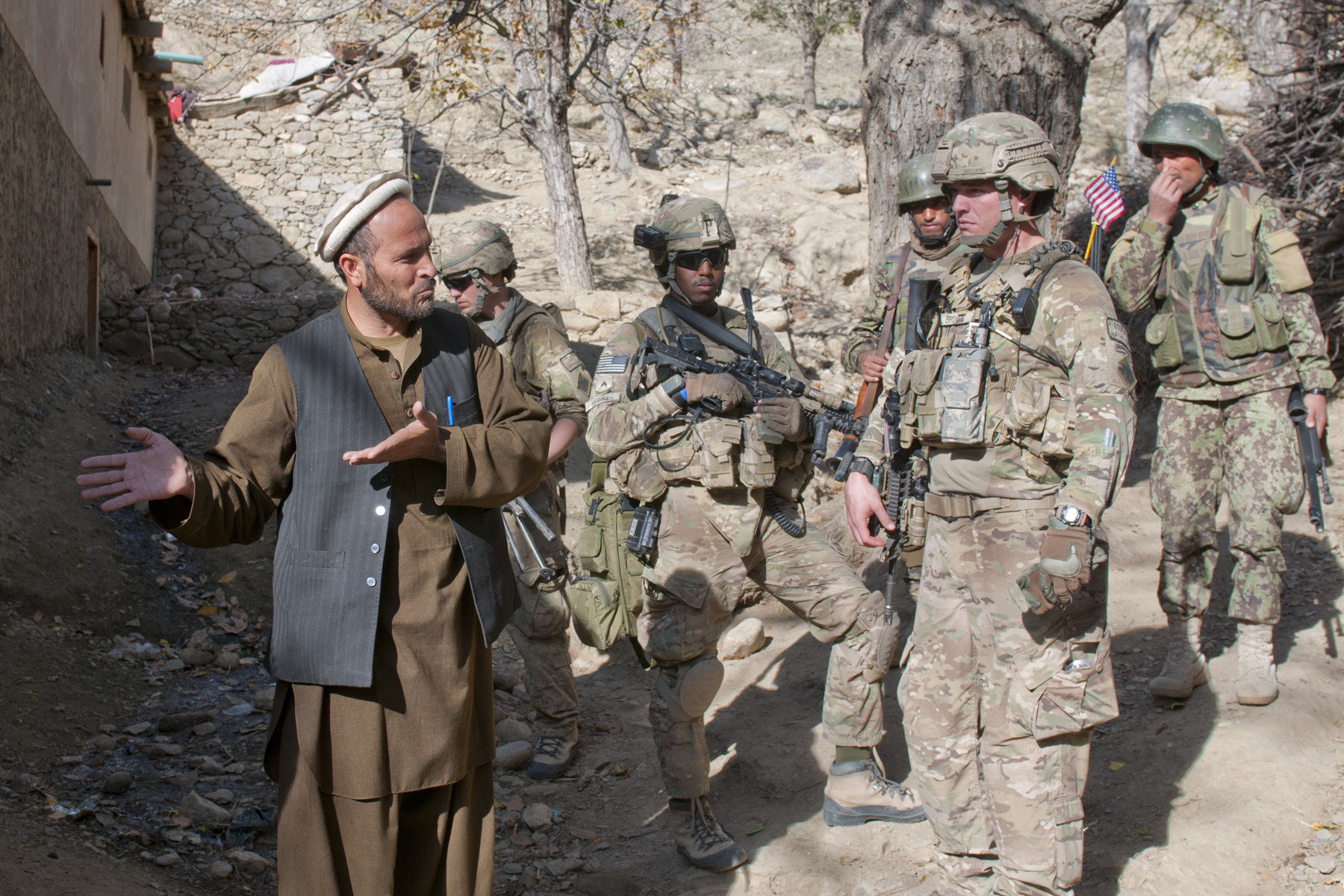
45th Infantry Brigade Combat Team and Afghan soldiers speaking with a civilian in 2011

In January 2003, components of the 45th Infantry Brigade were deployed to Saudi Arabia and Kuwait. Approximately 230 light infantry soldiers from A Company and B Company, 1st Battalion, 179th Infantry Regiment composed Task Force Ironhorse under the United States Army Central Command (ARCENT). Their primary mission leading up to the invasion of Iraq was to provide security for Patriot missile sites defending the respective countries from impending SCUD missile attacks. In March 2003, Company A was ordered from the area in and around Riyadh to the northern border cities of Tabuk and Arar, Saudi Arabia in defense of Iraqi retaliation and security of strategically redeployed Patriot Missile sites. Company B was ordered to advance into Iraq from the Kuwaiti border to provide security for ammo caches and forward operating Patriot missile sites. Task Force Ironhorse was the first deployment of Oklahoma National Guard infantry soldiers to a combat zone since the Korean War (members of the Oklahoma National Guard deployed with Field Artillery units during Desert Storm). Task Force Ironhorse completed their mission and returned in August 2003.

On 19 September 2003, the 45th Infantry Brigade, under the command of Brigadier General Thomas P. Mancino, was mobilized to deploy to Afghanistan in support of Operation Enduring Freedom, assuming command of Task Force Phoenix II from 2nd Brigade, 10th Mountain Division. The initial training for the mission was located at Fort Carson, Colorado. Task Force Phoenix II consisted of the Headquarters and Headquarters Company (HHC), C/1-179 Infantry Battalion for convoy and base security, HHC/700th Support Battalion for base support and convoy missions, the 136th Regional Training Institute of the Texas National Guard, 3 embedded training teams (ETT's). The 1st ETT was composed of officers, NCO's and soldiers from the 1–179 Infantry Battalion headquartered in Stillwater, Oklahoma. The 2nd ETT was composed of officers, NCO's and soldiers from the Vermont National Guard and the 3rd ETT was composed of officers, NCO's and soldiers from the South Carolina National Guard. In April 2004, 350 soldiers from the brigade's 1st Battalion, 279th Infantry Regiment also deployed to Joint Task Force Phoenix. The mission of Task Force Phoenix II was to 1) Embed training teams into the Afghan National Army to provide training assistance, mission support, and administrative pay support 2) Assume the duties of the Office of Military Cooperation-Afghanistan (OMC-A) 3) Establish the Kabul Military Training Center (KMTC) 4) Mentor the Central Corps Commander and Command Group 5) Establish and maintain postal operations for the eastern sector 6) Conduct convoy resupply missions and 7) Establish the Afghan National Army Supply Depot. During this rotation, the brigade grew the size of the Afghan National Army to over 14,000 as well as fielding a corps-sized force ahead of schedule. In August 2004, the brigade was replaced in this mission by the 76th Infantry Brigade, and subsequently returned home to the United States.

In March 2006, the 1–180th Cavalry (still infantry in '06) deployed as part of Task Force Phoenix V. They were attached to the 41st BCT (Oregon ARNG). They returned in June 2007. In April 2007, the brigade was alerted that it could be deployed to Iraq in support of Operation Iraqi Freedom by the end of the year. Four months later they were alerted that they would be heading to Iraq in 2008. The brigade mobilized in October of that year and trained in infantry techniques at army posts in Oklahoma and Arkansas. The 39th Infantry Brigade was also alerted for deployment during this time and deployed to Iraq in late 2007. During its rotation, the brigade was charged with turning over military facilities and Forward Operating Bases to the Iraqi Army as well as the Iraqi Police Force. The brigade returned to the United States in October 2008.

In October 2007, the 45th Infantry Brigade Combat Team deployed to Iraq in support of Operation Iraqi Freedom under the command of Brigadier General General Myles L. Deering for a one-year deployment.

The 45th IBCT deployed to Afghanistan in 2011 and reunited with the 201st Corps of the ANA, as partners this time, in combined combat operations against insurgent forces in Eastern Afghanistan suffering the loss of 14 Soldiers but making significant progress in disrupting and destroying insurgent operations while continuing to mentor the ANA and progressively handing off security missions to them. The full brigade mobilized in April 2011, but a late change in the mission diverted the 180th Cavalry and 160th Field Artillery to separate missions to support Iraq operations from Kuwait. The brigade's deployment is covered in the 2016 documentary Citizen Soldier.

Additionally, elements of the 45th Brigade have deployed to Egypt (1–180th Infantry Multinational Force and Observers (MFO)), Kuwait (245th Military Intelligence Co OIF), and for separate rotations to Iraq (245th Engineer Co OIF) and Afghanistan (1–180th Infantry Task Force Phoenix V).

== Hurricane Katrina (2005) ==
On 1 September 2005, the 45th Infantry Brigade, under the command of Brigadier General Myles L. Deering, was mobilized to deploy to New Orleans, Louisiana in support of Hurricane Katrina disaster relief efforts. Within hours, the 45th Infantry Brigade was given the designation "Task Force Oklahoma" and additional units were assigned from the Oklahoma National Guard to the task force. The first units assigned to Task Force Oklahoma (1345 Transportation Company and HHB/1-171 Field Artillery Battalion) arrived in New Orleans within 24 hours of Hurricane Katrina making landfall on 30 August 2005. The rest of the brigade, from Oklahoma, made it to New Orleans, via ground convoy, through Texas on 31 August 2005. Other units arrived via ground convoy or through the air, landing at Belle Chasse Naval Air Station

Units Reporting to the 45th Infantry Brigade in Support of Hurricane Katrina Support Operations (Task Force Oklahoma) 29 August 2005 – 15 October 2005
Name	Number of Troops
HHC, 45th Infantry Brigade (OK)	144
245th Military Intelligence Company (OK)	15
245th Engineer Company (OK)	58
Troop E, 145th Cavalry (OK)	52
1st Battalion, 179th Infantry (OK)	341
1st Battalion, 279th Infantry (OK)	322
1st Battalion, 180th Infantry (OK)	200
700th Support Battalion (OK)	277
1st Battalion, 160th Field Artillery (OK)	232
1345th Transportation Company (OK)	121
1st Battalion, 171st Field Artillery (OK)	344
2d Battalion, 185th Armor (CA)	364
125th Military Police Battalion (PR)	707
870th Military Police Company (CA)	121
176th Engineer Battalion (TX)	122
770th Military Police Battalion (PR)	104
136th Security Forces Squadron (ANG)(OK)	39
204th Security Forces Squadron (ANG)(TX)	53
72d Military Police Company (NV)	100
119th Military Police Battalion (RI)	167
1st Platoon, 186th Military Police Company (OR)	95
1120th Maintenance Company (OK)	46
42d Civil Support Team (WMD)(NC)	3
54th Civil Support Team (WMD)(WI)	6
ROWPU team (SC)	9
Total	4,042

The 1345th Transportation Company and the 1st Battalion, 171st Field Artillery were among the first military units to arrive in New Orleans and stage out of the Morial Convention Center and the Louisiana Superdome. The task force headquarters was established at the Wal-Mart parking lot at 1901 Tchoupitoulas Street and street by street search and rescue operations began in earnest on 1 September 2005. At the time, this was the largest mobilization and deployment of the 45th since 1950. The 45th Infantry Brigade was eventually relieved of its responsibilities in New Orleans and returned to Oklahoma on 15 October 2005.

== Structure ==
The brigade is a subordinate unit of the Oklahoma Army National Guard, headquartered in Norman, Oklahoma. There is a headquarters company, a cavalry squadron, an airborne infantry battalion, two infantry battalions, a field artillery battalion, an engineer battalion, and a brigade support battalion.

- Headquarters and Headquarters Company
- 1st Squadron (Reconnaissance Surveillance and Target Acquisition), 180th Cavalry Regiment
- 2nd Battalion, 134th Infantry Regiment (Nebraska Army National Guard)
- 1st Battalion, 179th Infantry Regiment
- 1st Battalion, 279th Infantry Regiment
- 1st Battalion, 160th Field Artillery Regiment (105mm Towed Howitzer)
- 545th Brigade Engineer Battalion
- 700th Brigade Support Battalion

== Lineage and honors ==
=== Lineage ===
- Constituted 19 October 1920 as Headquarters, 45th Division (to be organized with troops from Arizona, Colorado, New Mexico, and Oklahoma).
- Organized and federally recognized 3 August 1923 at Oklahoma City, Oklahoma; Headquarters Detachment organized and federally. recognized 1 July 1924 at Oklahoma City, Oklahoma.
- Headquarters and Headquarters Detachment, 45th Division, inducted into federal service 16 September 1940 at Oklahoma City.
- Redesignated 23 February 1942 as the 45th Infantry Division.
- Reorganized and redesignated 23 February 1942 as Headquarters, 45th Infantry Division.
- Inactivated 7 December 1945 at Camp Bowie, Texas.
- Reorganized and federally recognized 5 September 1946 in the Oklahoma National Guard at Oklahoma City.
- Ordered into active federal service 1 September 1950 at Oklahoma City.
- (Headquarters, 45th Infantry Division [NGUS], organized and federally recognized 15 September 1952 at Oklahoma City).
- Released from active federal service 30 April 1954 and reverted to state control; federal recognition concurrently withdrawn from Headquarters, 45th Infantry Division (NGUS).
- Reorganized and redesignated 1 February 1968 as Headquarters, 45th Infantry Brigade, and location changed to Edmond (Headquarters Company, 45th Infantry Brigade, concurrently reorganized and redesignated from Headquarters Company, 1st Battalion, 179th Infantry).
- Location changed 1 October 1996 to Oklahoma City.
- Ordered into active Federal service 19 September 2003 at Oklahoma City; released from active Federal service 17 September 2004 and reverted to state control.
- Ordered into active Federal service 19 October 2007 at Oklahoma City.
- Reorganized and redesignated 1 September 2008 as Headquarters, 45th Infantry Brigade Combat Team.
- Released from active Federal service 21 November 2008 and reverted to state control.
- Location changed 1 July 2010 to Norman.
- Ordered into active Federal service 27 March 2011 at Norman; released from active Federal service 29 April 2012 and reverted to state control.

=== Honors ===
The brigade received all of the honors previously accorded to the 45th Infantry Division, including its campaign streamers, which give credit for participation in combat. Additionally, several of these streamers contain the Arrowhead device, signifying the division's participation in amphibious assaults.

- As the 45th Infantry Division:

Conflict	Streamer	Inscription	Year(s)
A red ribbon with four vertical dark green stripes in the center.	French Croix de Guerre, World War II (With Palm)	Embroidered "Acquafondata"	1943–1944
	European-African-Middle Eastern Campaign Streamer	Sicily (with Arrowhead)	1943
	European-African-Middle Eastern Campaign Streamer	Naples–Foggia (with Arrowhead)	1943
	European-African-Middle Eastern Campaign Streamer	Anzio (wirth Arrowhead)	1943
	European-African-Middle Eastern Campaign Streamer	Rome–Arno	1944
	European-African-Middle Eastern Campaign Streamer	Southern France (with Arrowhead)	1944
	European-African-Middle Eastern Campaign Streamer	Rhineland	1944–1945
	European-African-Middle Eastern Campaign Streamer	Ardennes–Alsace	1944–1945
	European-African-Middle Eastern Campaign Streamer	Central Europe	1945
A white ribbon with vertical green and red stripes on its edges and a red and blue circle in the middle	Republic of Korea Presidential Unit Citation	For service in Korea	1952–1953
	Korean Service Campaign Streamer	Second Korean Winter	1951–1952
	Korean Service Campaign Streamer	Korea, Summer–Fall 1952	1952
	Korean Service Campaign Streamer	Third Korean Winter	1952–1953
	Korean Service Campaign Streamer	Korea, Summer 1953	1953

- As 45th Infantry Brigade Combat Team

Conflict	Streamer	Inscription	Year(s)
	Meritorious Unit Commendation, HHC Only	For service in Afghanistan	2011–2012
	Global War on Terror - OEF	Afghanistan, Consolidation I	2003–2004, 2006
	Global War on Terror - OEF	Afghanistan, Consolidation II	2006–2007
	Global War on Terror - OEF	Afghanistan, Consolidation III	2011
	Global War on Terror - OEF	Afghanistan, Transition I	2011–2012
	Global War on Terror - OIF/OND	Liberation of Iraq	2003
	Global War on Terror - OIF/OND	Iraq Surge	2007–2008
	Global War on Terror - OIF/OND	Operation New Dawn	2011–2012

== Sources ==
- McGrath, John J. (2004). The Brigade: A History: Its Organization and Employment in the US Army. Combat Studies Institute Press. ISBN 978-1-4404-4915-4.
- Wilson, John B. (1999). Armies, Corps, Divisions, and Separate Brigades. United States Army Center of Military History. ASIN B000OJKX1S. CMH Pub 60-7-1. Archived from the original on 8 June 2010.
