= 700th Support Battalion (United States) =

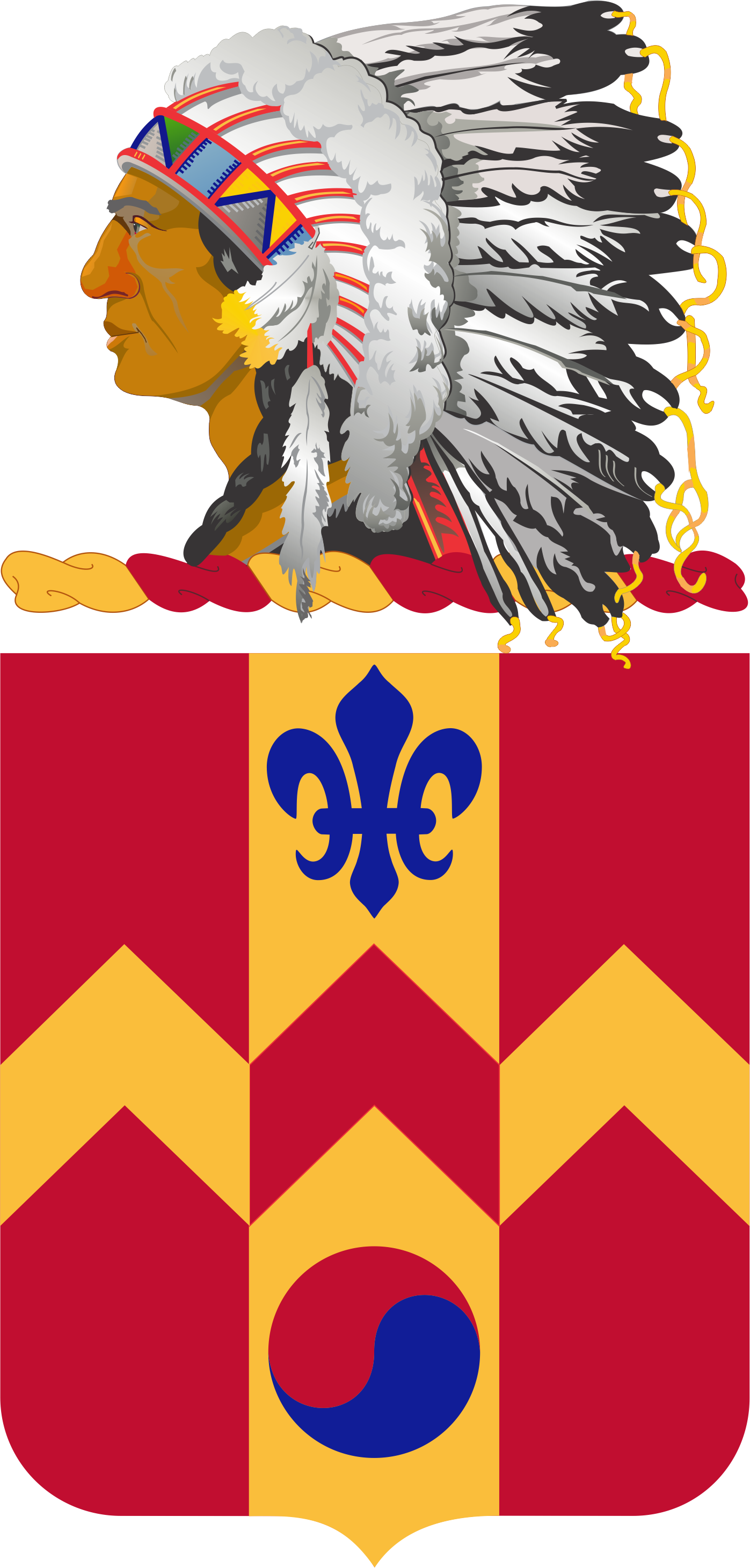
- Coat of arms
- Active: 23 May 1923–
- Country: USA
- Branch: Army
- Type: Support battalion
- Role: Combat support and combat service support
- Size: Battalion
- Garrison/HQ: Norman, OK
- Mottos: Tradition, Pride, Support
- Colors: Red, gold, blue

Commanders
- Current commander: LTC Eric Frazier
- Notable commanders: BG Dale Laubach 1968 - 1976, BG James Walker 1984 - 1987, MG Miles Deering 1992 - 1995

Insignia
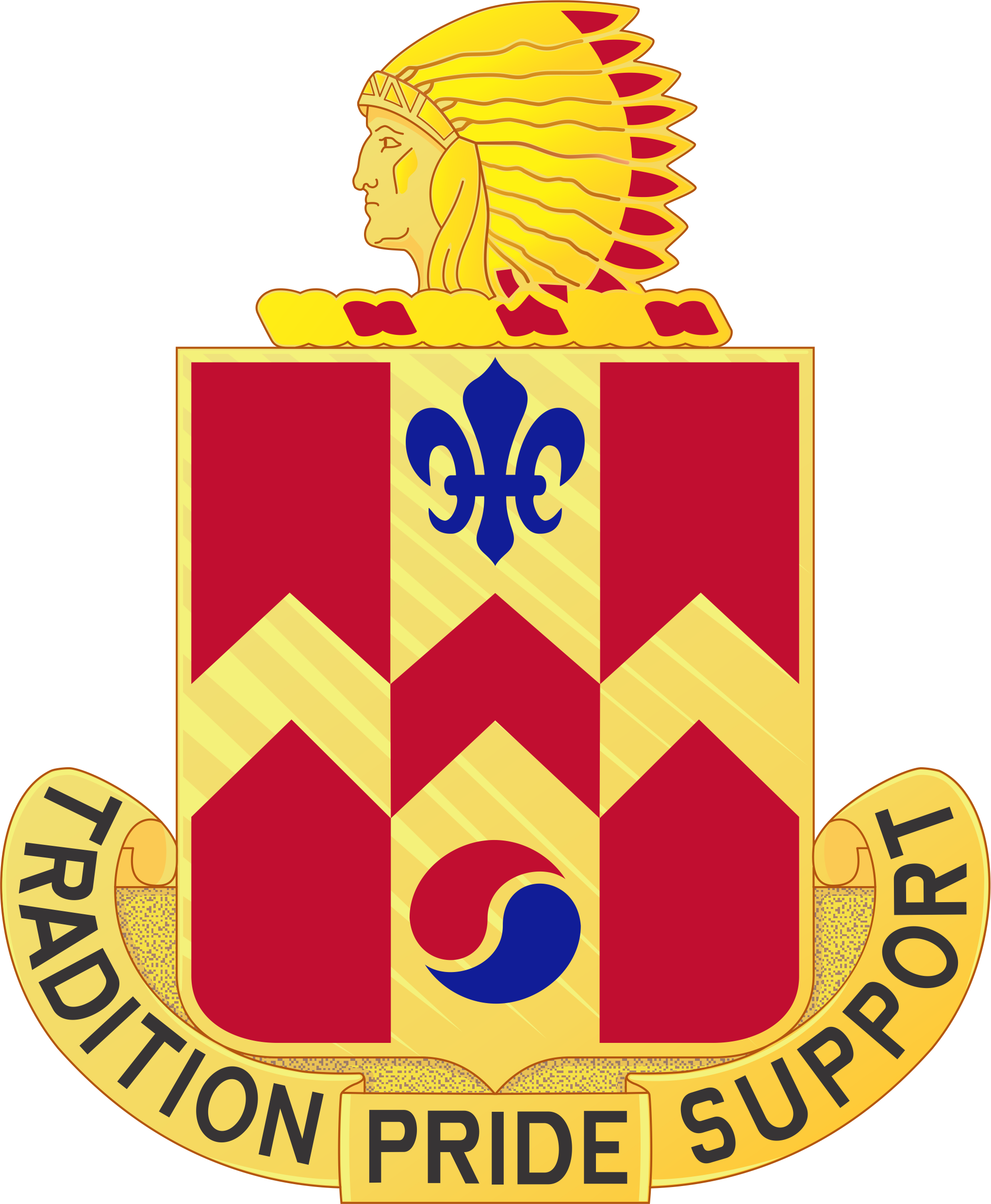
- Distinctive unit insignia

The 700th Brigade Support Battalion is headquartered in Norman, Oklahoma. It is a part of the 45th Infantry Brigade Combat Team, Oklahoma Army National Guard.

The headquarters and headquarters company of the 700th BSB is the element of the 45th IBCT with the most campaign streamers, composed of smaller elements which saw action during World War I, predating the division, that would become the 700th BSB. The battalion, originally the 120th Medical Regiment, formed in 1923, served in World War II and the Korean War as part of the 45th Infantry Division, then again, in its current designation as 700th Support Battalion, in Afghanistan and Iraq as part of the 45th Infantry Brigade.

== Subordinate units ==
Headquarters and Headquarters Company, 700th Brigade Support Battalion at Norman

A Company, 700th Brigade Support Battalion (General Supply, Fuel, Water, Ammo) at Norman

- DET 1 (Heavy Transportation) at Vance AFB, Enid, OK

B Company, 700th Brigade Support Battalion (Maintenance) at Norman

C Company, 700th Brigade Support Battalion (Medical) at Norman (Moved from Midwest City in 2015)

D Company, 700th Brigade Support Battalion (Forward Support Company, 1-180th CAV) at McAlester

E Company, 700th Brigade Support Battalion (Forward Support Company, 1-179th IN) at Stillwater

G Company, 700th Brigade Support Battalion (Forward Support Company, 1-279th IN) at Sand Springs

F Company, 700th Brigade Support Battalion (Forward Support Company, 1-160th FA) at Chandler

I Company, 700th Brigade Support Battalion (Forward Support Company, 2-134th IN) at Omaha, Nebraska

== Deployments ==
WW I (Separate units)

WW II (45th Infantry Division)

Korea (45th Infantry Division)

Global War on Terror (45th Infantry Brigade Combat Team)

- Afghanistan, Consolidation I
- Iraq Surge
- Afghanistan, Consolidation III
- Afghanistan, Transition I

New Orleans (Hurricane Katrina/Rita) (45th Infantry Brigade Combat Team)

== History and lineage ==
Organized 23 May 1923 from new and existing units in the Oklahoma National Guard as the 120th Medical Regiment and assigned to the 45th Division (later re-designated as the 45th Infantry Division). Inducted into federal service 16 September 1940 at home stations. Reorganized and re-designated 11 February 1942 as the 120th Medical Battalion. Inactivated 17–24 November 1945 at Camp Bowie, Texas. Reorganized and federally recognized 10 December 1946 with headquarters at Norman. Ordered into active federal service 1 September 1950 at home stations. (120 Medical Battalion [NGUS] organized and federally recognized 7 January 1953 with headquarters at Oklahoma City) Released 30 April 1954 from active federal service and reverted to state control, with headquarters at Oklahoma City; federal recognition concurrently withdrawn from the 120th Medical Battalion [NGUS]. Relieved 1 February 1968 from assignment to the 45th Infantry Division; Battalion concurrently broken up and its elements reorganized and redesignated as follows:

Headquarters and Company A as Headquarters and Headquarters Detachment, 120th Medical Battalion.
Company B as Company B, 700th Support Battalion, an element of the 45th Infantry Brigade.
Company C as Headquarters and Headquarters Company, 120th Supply Service Battalion - hereafter separate lineage.
Company D as the 145th Medical Company - hereafter separate lineage.

Headquarters and Headquarters Detachment, 120th Medical Battalion, consolidated 1 October 1996 with the 700th Support Battalion and consolidated unit designated as the 700th Support Battalion, an element of the 45th Infantry Brigade. Reorganized and redesignated 1 September 2008 as under the 45th Infantry Brigade Combat Team. Released from active Federal service 25 November 2008 and reverted to state control. Ordered into active Federal service 27 March 2011 at home stations; released from active Federal service 29 April 2012 and reverted to state control.)

== Distinctive unit insignia ==
Description A Gold color metal and enamel device 1 3/8 inches (3.5 cm) in height overall consisting of a shield blazoned: Gules a pale Or and a bar dancette counterchanged between in chief a fleur-de-lis Azure and in base a Taeguk in the national colors of Korea (Scarlet over Blue). Attached above from a wreath Or and Gules (Yellow and Scarlet), an Indian's head with war bonnet all Proper. Attached below and to the sides of the shield a Gold scroll inscribed “TRADITION PRIDE SUPPORT” in Black letters.

Symbolism Buff (yellow) and scarlet are the colors used for Support. The bar dancette (formed by three chevrons, a symbol derived from the shape of a rafter, or roof support) is used to indicate the Battalion's mission of support. The bar dancette also simulates three arrowheads, signifying participation by elements of the battalion in three World War II assault landings, while the three vertical divisions allude to participation in World Wars I and II and the Korean War. The scarlet chevron at center refers to the Meritorious Unit Commendation, the fleur-de-lis to the French Croix de Guerre and the Taeguk to the Korean Presidential Unit Citation, unit decorations awarded to elements of the battalion for service in World War II and Korea.

Background The distinctive unit insignia was approved on 29 February 1972.

== Campaign participation credit ==
World War I: Champagne-Marne; Aisne-Marne; St. Mihiel; Meuse-Argonne; Lorraine 1918; Champagne 1918

World War II: Sicily, w/arrowhead; Naples-Foggia w/arrowhead; Anzio w/arrowhead; Rome-Arno; Southern France w/arrowhead; Rhineland; Ardennes-Alsace; Central Europe

Korea: Second Korean Winter; Korea, Summer/Fall 1952; Third Korean Winter; Korea, Summer 1953

Global War on Terror

- Operation Enduring Freedom: Afghanistan, Consolidation I; Afghanistan, Consolidation III; Afghanistan, Transition I
- Operation Iraqi Freedom: Iraq Surge

== Honors, citations and decorations ==
- French Croix de Guerre with Palm, World War II, Streamer embroidered ACQUAFONDATA
- Company B and Company C each additionally entitled to: Meritorious Unit Commendation (Army), Streamer embroidered ITALY
- Company C 700th Brigade Support battalion, formerly 700th Ordnance Maintenance Company additionally entitled to Meritorious Unit Commendation, per DAGO 36, dated 28 April 1953.
- Republic of Korea Presidential Unit Citation, Streamer embroidered KOREA 1951-1953
