= 45th Infantry Division (United States) =

Formation of the United States Army (1920–1968)

- 45th ID Shoulder Sleeve Insignia
- Active: 19 October 1920–7 December 1945; 5 September 1946–1 February 1968; became 45th Infantry Brigade
- Country: United States
- Branch: United States Army
- Type: Infantry
- Size: Division
- Part of: Oklahoma Army National Guard
- Garrison/HQ: Oklahoma City, Oklahoma
- Nickname: "Thunderbird"
- Mottos: Semper Anticus (Latin: "Always Forward")
- Engagements: World War II; Sicily; Naples-Foggia; Anzio; Rome-Arno; Southern France; Rhineland; Central Europe; Korean War; Second Phase Offensive; Third Battle of Seoul

Commanders
- Notable commanders: Jimmy l. Vanmeter; William S. Key; Dwight E. Beach; Philip De Witt Ginder

Insignia
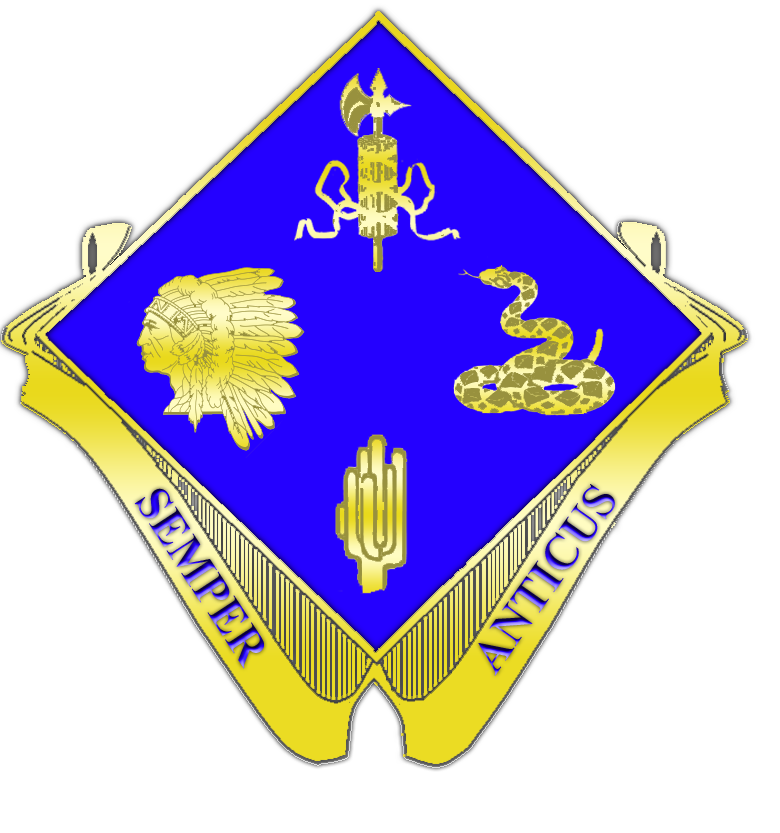
- Distinctive unit insignia (1920–46)

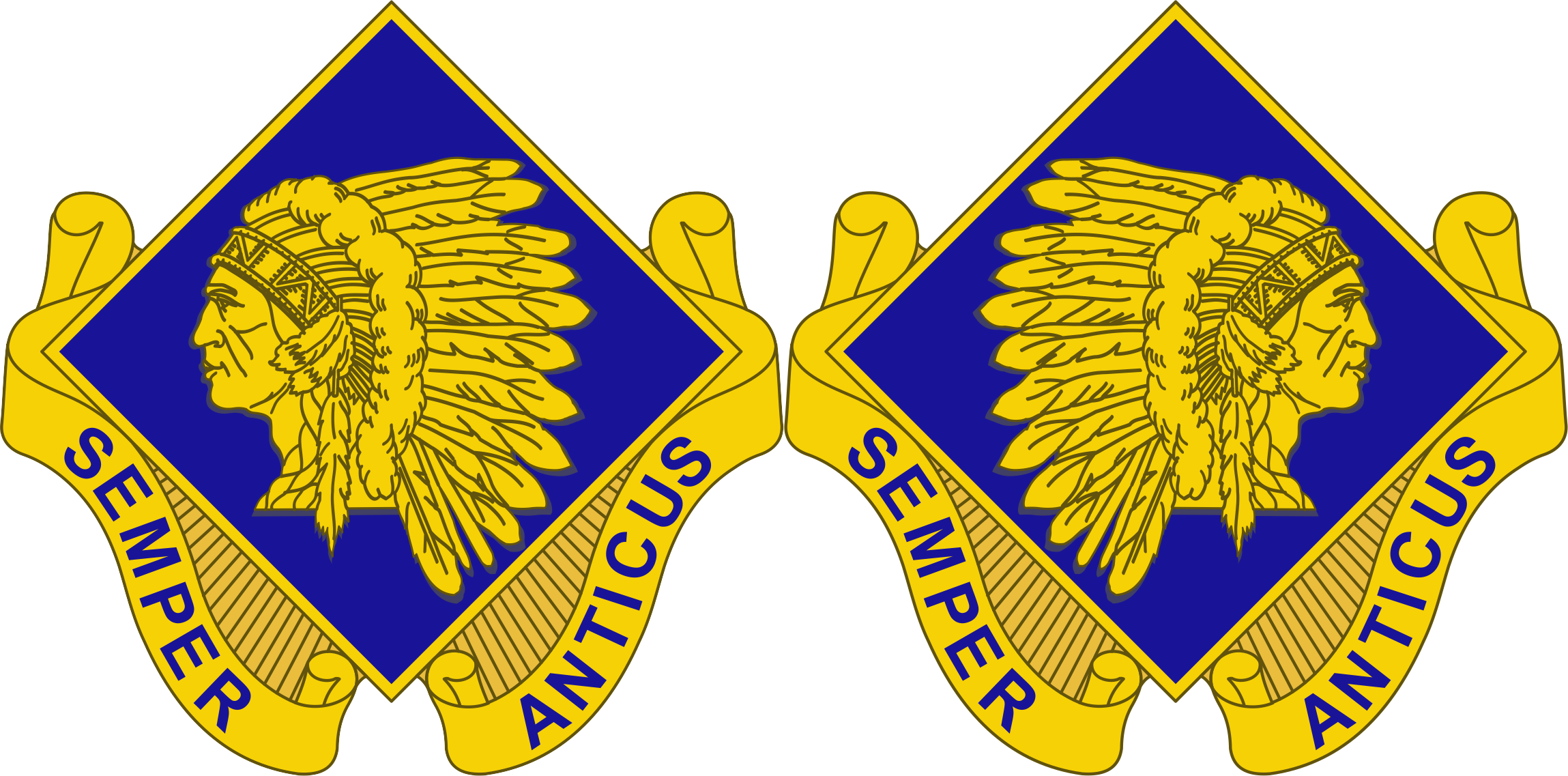
- Distinctive unit insignia (1946–68)

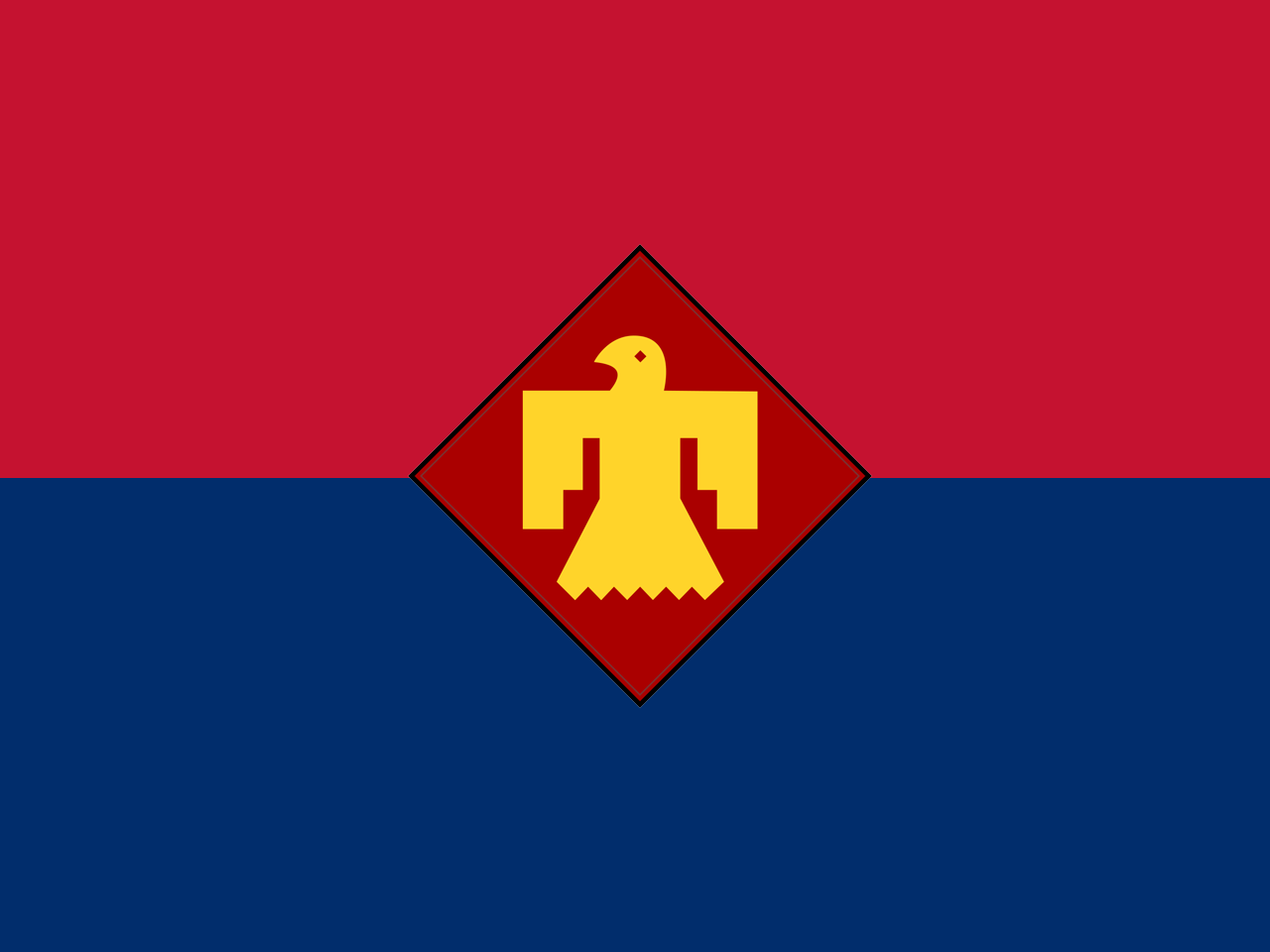
- Flag of the United States Army 45th Infantry Division

The 45th Infantry Division was an infantry division of the United States Army, most associated with the Oklahoma Army National Guard, from 1920 to 1968. Headquartered for most of its history in Oklahoma City, Oklahoma, the guardsmen fought in both World War II and the Korean War.

The 45th Infantry Division guardsmen saw no major action until they became one of the first National Guard units activated in World War II in 1941. They took part in intense fighting during the invasion of Sicily and the attack on Salerno in the 1943 Italian Campaign. Slowly advancing through Italy, they fought at Anzio until the capture of Rome. After landing in France during Operation Dragoon, they joined the 1945 drive into Germany that ended the War in Europe.

After a brief inactivation and subsequent reorganization as a unit restricted to Oklahomans, the division returned to duty in 1951 for the Korean War. It joined the United Nations troops on the front lines during the stalemate of the second half of the war, with constant, low-level fighting and trench warfare against the People's Volunteer Army of China that produced little gain for either side. The division remained on the front lines in such engagements as Old Baldy Hill and Hill Eerie until the end of the war, returning to the U.S. in 1954.

The division remained a National Guard formation until its downsizing in 1968. Several units were activated to replace the division and carry on its lineage. Over the course of its history, the 45th Infantry Division sustained over 25,000 battle casualties, and its men were awarded ten Medals of Honor, twelve campaign streamers, the Croix de Guerre and the Republic of Korea Presidential Unit Citation.

== History ==
=== Formation ===
With the American entry into World War I, in April 1917, troops of the National Guard were formed into the units which exist today, with elements of the Colorado National Guard forming the 157th Infantry Regiment, the Arizona National Guard forming the 158th Infantry Regiment, and the New Mexico National Guard forming the 120th Engineer Regiment. These units were assigned to the 40th Division, and deployed to France where the division was used as a "depot" unit to process and provide replacements for front-line units. They returned home at the end of the war, which occurred on Armistice with Germany. The Oklahoma National Guard units that would later become the 179th Infantry Regiment and 180th Infantry Regiment were assigned to the 36th Division and would earn a combat participation credit during the Meuse–Argonne offensive in France as part of the 142nd Infantry.

=== Interwar period ===
On 19 October 1920, units of the Oklahoma National Guard were organized as part of the 45th Infantry Division, also manned with troops from Arizona, Colorado, and New Mexico. The division headquarters was federally recognized on 3 August 1923 in Oklahoma City, Oklahoma. It was assigned the 89th Infantry Brigade of the Colorado and Arizona National Guards, and the 90th Infantry Brigade of the Oklahoma National Guard. As a consequence of these militia roots, when the division was properly organized, many of its members were marksmen and outdoorsmen from the remote frontier regions of the Southwestern United States. The division's first commander was Major General Baird H. Markham.

The designated mobilization training center for the 45th Division was Fort Sill, Oklahoma. From 1922 to 1936, the division's subordinate units generally held separate summer camps at locations within their respective states: Fort Sill for Oklahoma units; Fort Tuthill, near Flagstaff, for Arizona units; Camp Maximilliano Luna in San Miguel County for New Mexico units; and Camp George West near Golden, Colorado, for Colorado units. For at least 3 years, in 1927, 1932, and 1933, the division's subordinate units trained over 250 company-grade officers of the 95th and 103rd Divisions at the various state encampment locations. In 1936, the division and brigade staffs participated in the Third Army command post exercise at Fort Sam Houston and Camp Bullis, Texas, which was designed to prepare them for the large-scale army maneuvers to be held the summer of 1938. For participation in the Eighth Corps Area concentration of the Third Army Maneuvers in August 1938, the division was split between Camp Bullis (Oklahoma elements), Fort Bliss, Texas (New Mexico and Colorado elements), and Fort Huachuca, Arizona (Arizona elements). During the maneuver at Fort Bliss, the 45th Division (-) operated as part of the provisional Brown Corps with the 2nd Division against the 36th Division and the 56th Cavalry Brigade of the Blue Corps.

Before 1939, the division's symbol was a red diamond with a yellow swastika, a tribute to the large Native American population in the southwestern United States.

The 45th Infantry Division engaged in regular drills but no major events in its first few years, though the division's Colorado elements were called in to help quell a large coal mining strike. The onset of the Great Depression in the 1930s severely curtailed its funding for training and equipment. Major General Roy Hoffman took command in 1931, followed by Alexander M. Tuthill in 1933, Alexander E. McPherren in 1935, and William S. Key in 1936. In 1937, the division's troops were once again called up, this time to help manage a locust plague affecting Colorado.

The division's original shoulder sleeve insignia, approved in August 1924, featured a swastika, a common Native American symbol, as a tribute to the Southwestern United States region which had a large population of Native Americans. However, with the rise of the Nazi Party in Germany, with its infamous swastika symbol, the 45th Division stopped using the insignia. After a long process of reviewing design submissions, a design by Woody Big Bow, a Kiowa artist from Carnegie, Oklahoma, was chosen for the new shoulder sleeve insignia. The new insignia featured the Thunderbird, another Native American symbol, and was approved in 1939. In 1940, approximately 2,000 of the division's 9,500 troops were Native Americans, representing fifty tribes. During the interwar period, several units were composed predominantly or entirely of Native American personnel at various points, including Companies D and F, 158th Infantry, and Company L, 180th Infantry.

In August 1940, the 45th Division again participated in the Third Army maneuvers, this time near the Kisatchie National Forest in Louisiana as part of the provisional VIII Corps. This was the first opportunity for all division elements to assemble and operate together since its organization.

=== World War II ===
==== WWII division organization ====
===== Square division =====
On 16 September February 1940, the 45th Division was inducted into federal service at home stations. It was one of four National Guard divisions to be inducted into federal service for a one-year period that day. The other divisions were the 30th Division, 41st Division and 44th Division. After being inducted into federal service the 45th Division assembled at Fort Sill in Oklahoma, where it immediately began basic combat training. It was intended that the division remain at Fort Sill only temporarily, with a new site for the division being chosen near Abilene in Texas, named Camp Barkeley. The division relocated to Camp Barkeley at the end of February 1941.

At the time the division still retained its World War I square organization and consisted of the following units.

45th Division square organization (click to enlarge)

- 45th Division, in Oklahoma City (OK)
  - 45th Division Headquarters
  - 89th Infantry Brigade, in Denver (CO)
    - Headquarters and Headquarters Company
    - 157th Infantry Regiment, in Denver (CO)
      - Headquarters and Headquarters Company
      - 3× Infantry battalions
        - each battalion consists of: 1× Headquarters and Headquarters Detachment, 3× Rifle companies, 1× Weapons Company
      - Anti-Tank Company (M3 37mm Anti-Tank guns)
      - Service Company
    - 158th Infantry Regiment, in Tucson (AZ)
      - same organization as 157th Infantry Regiment
  - 90th Infantry Brigade, in Oklahoma City (OK)
    - Headquarters and Headquarters Company
    - 179th Infantry Regiment, in Pawnee (OK)
      - same organization as 157th Infantry Regiment
    - 180th Infantry Regiment, in Muskogee (OK)
      - same organization as 157th Infantry Regiment
  - 70th Field Artillery Brigade, in Oklahoma City (OK)
    - Headquarters and Headquarters Battery
    - 158th Field Artillery Regiment, in Anadarko (OK)
      - Headquarters and Headquarters Battery
      - 2× Light Field Artillery battalions
        - Headquarters and Headquarters Battery
        - 3× Howitzer batteries (M1897 75mm field guns), replaced by M2 105mm towed howitzers in 1941)
        - Service Battery
    - 158th Field Artillery Regiment, in Tulsa (OK)
      - same organization as 157th Field Artillery Regiment
    - 189th Field Artillery Regiment, in Enid (OK)
      - Headquarters and Headquarters Battery
      - 2× Medium Field Artillery battalions
        - Headquarters and Headquarters Battery
        - 3× Howitzer batteries (M1918 155mm towed howitzers, replaced by M1 155mm towed howitzers in 1941)
        - Anti-Tank Battery (M1897 75mm anti-tank guns)
        - Service Battery
  - 120th Engineer Regiment, in Las Cruces (NM)
    - Headquarters and Headquarters and Service Company
    - 2× Engineer battalions
      - each battalion consists of: 1× Headquarters, 3× Engineer companies
  - 120th Medical Regiment, in Oklahoma City (OK)
    - Headquarters and Headquarters and Service Company
    - Collecting Battalion
      - battalion consists of: 1× Headquarters, 3× Collecting companies
    - Ambulance Battalion
      - battalion consists of: 1× Headquarters, 3× Ambulance companies
    - Clearing Battalion
      - battalion consists of: 1× Headquarters, 3× Clearing companies
  - 120th Quartermaster Regiment, in Oklahoma City (OK)
    - Headquarters and Headquarters Company
    - 2× Truck battalions
      - each battalion consists of: 1× Headquarters, 2× Truck companies
    - Light Maintenance and Car Battalion
      - battalion consists of: 1× Headquarters, 1× Light Maintenance Company, 1× Car Company
    - Service Company
  - Headquarters, Special Troops, in Stillwater (OK)
    - Headquarters Company, 45th Division, in Wetumka (OK)
    - 45th Signal Company, in Alva (OK)
    - 120th Ordnance Company, in Claremore (OK)
    - 45th Military Police Company, in Marlow (OK)

In August 1941, the 45th Infantry Division took part in the Louisiana Maneuvers, the largest peacetime exercises in U.S. military history. The division was assigned to VIII Corps with the 2nd and 36th Infantry Divisions, camped near Pitkin. Still operating with outmoded equipment from World War I, the division did not perform well during these exercises, and was criticized by officers who considered it "feeble." In spite of these deficiencies, less than one month later, the men's tour of duty was extended for another eighteen months, much to their chagrin, because of concerns of an impending American entry into World War II.

===== Triangular division =====
On 23 February 1942, as a part of an Army-wide reorganization of National Guard divisions, the 45th Division was reorganized as a triangular division. The division's two brigade headquarters were disbanded in favor of a structure containing three separate regimental commands reporting directly to the division headquarters, as well as four field artillery battalions under a division artillery headquarters, with the engineer, medical, and quartermaster regiments also reduced to battalions. The 158th Infantry Regiment had already sailed after the Japanese attack on Pearl Harbor to Panama to reinforce the defenses of the Panama Canal Zone. The regiment arrived in Panama on 2 January 1942 and was officially relieved from assignment to the 45th Division on 11 February 1942. With the reorganization the division was renamed 45th Infantry Division. Afterwards the 45th Infantry Division was composed of the following units:

45th Infantry Division triangular organization (click to enlarge)

- 45th Infantry Division
  - 45th Infantry Division Headquarters
  - 45th Cavalry Reconnaissance Troop (Mechanized) (M3 scout cars and then M8 Greyhound armored cars)
  - 157th Infantry Regiment
    - Headquarters and Headquarters Company
    - 3× Infantry battalions
      - each battalion consists of: 1× Headquarters and Headquarters Company, 3× Rifle companies, 1× Heavy Weapons Company
    - Cannon Company (T12 Gun Motor Carriages and T19 Howitzer Motor Carriages, later replaced by either M3 105mm towed howitzers or M7 Priest self propelled howitzers)
    - Anti-Tank Company (M3 37mm anti-tank guns, which were replaced by 1944 with M1 57mm anti-tank guns)
    - Service Company
  - 179th Infantry Regiment
    - same organization as 157th Infantry Regiment
  - 180th Infantry Regiment
    - same organization as 157th Infantry Regiment
  - 45th Infantry Division Artillery
    - Headquarters and Headquarters Battery
    - 158th Field Artillery Battalion
      - Headquarters and Headquarters Battery
      - 3× Batteries (M2 105mm towed howitzers)
      - Service Battery
    - 160th Field Artillery Battalion
      - same organization as 158th Field Artillery Battalion
    - 171st Field Artillery Battalion
      - same organization as 158th Field Artillery Battalion
    - 189th Field Artillery Battalion
      - Headquarters and Headquarters Battery
      - 3× Batteries (M1 155mm towed howitzers)
      - Service Battery
  - Headquarters Special Troops
    - Headquarters Company, 45th Infantry Division
    - 45th Signal Company
    - 45th Quartermaster Company
    - 700th Ordnance Light Maintenance Company
    - 120th Military Police Platoon
    - 45th Infantry Division Band (attached)
  - 45th Quartermaster Battalion (Between September and November 1942 Quartermaster battalions were disbanded and their platoons used to form a Quartermaster Company and an Ordnance Company, which were both assigned to Headquarters Special Troops)
    - Headquarters and Headquarters Company (includes a service platoon and a maintenance platoon)
    - Truck Company
  - 120th Engineer Combat Battalion
    - Headquarters and Headquarters and Service Company
    - 3× Engineer combat companies
  - 120th Medical Battalion
    - Headquarters and Headquarters Detachment
    - 3× Collecting companies
    - Clearing Company

Throughout 1942, the division continued training at Camp Barkeley before moving to Fort Devens in Massachusetts, to undergo amphibious assault training in preparation for an invasion of Italy. It then moved to Pine Camp in New York briefly for winter warfare training, but was hampered by continuously poor weather. In January 1943, the division moved to Fort Pickett in Virginia, for its final training. The division, now commanded by Major General Troy H. Middleton, a Regular Army soldier and highly distinguished World War I veteran, moved to the Hampton Roads Port of Embarkation's Camp Patrick Henry to await combat loading on the transports for the European Theater of Operations.

==== Combat chronicle ====
Campaigns of the 45th Infantry Division

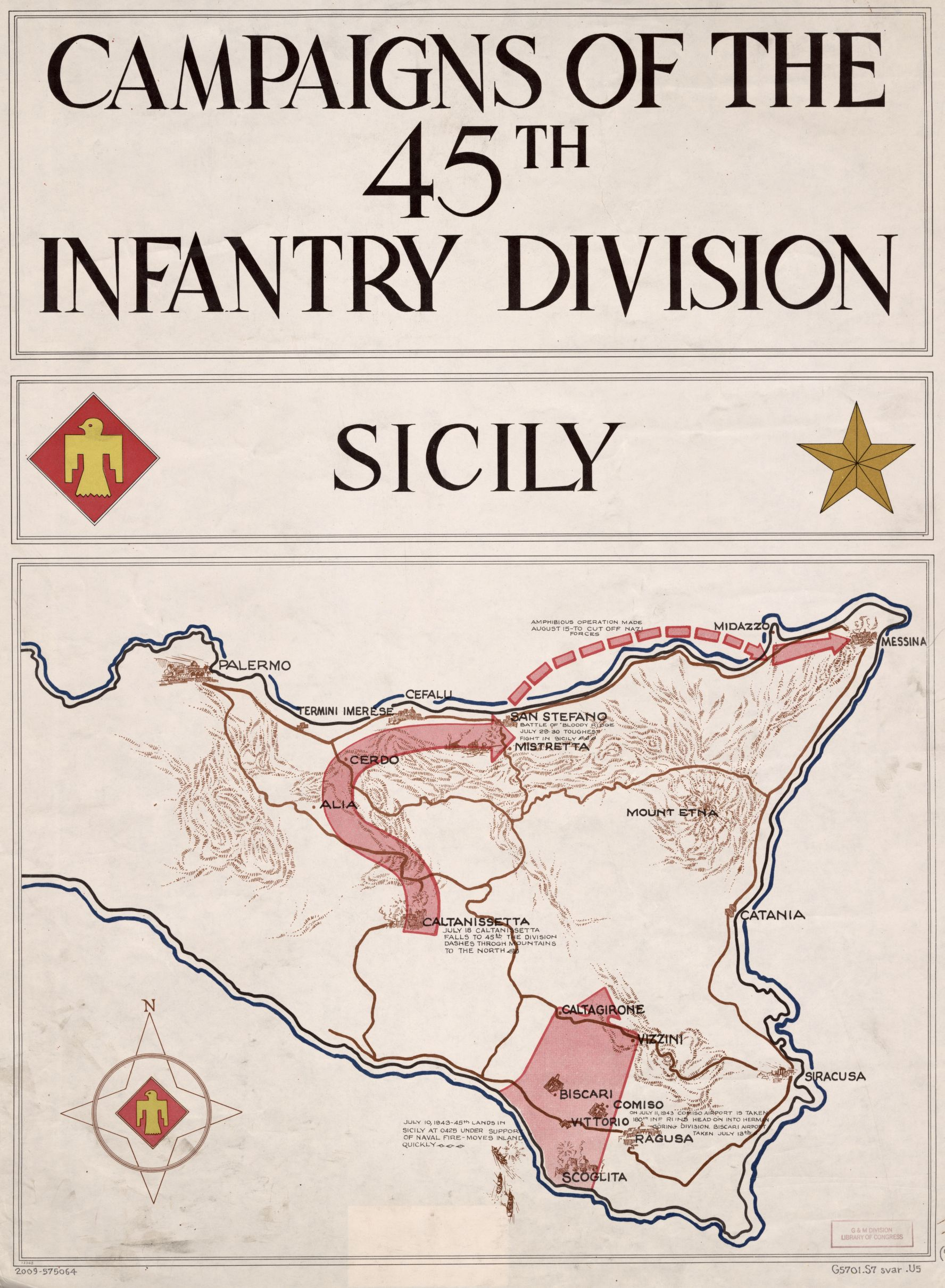
Sicily

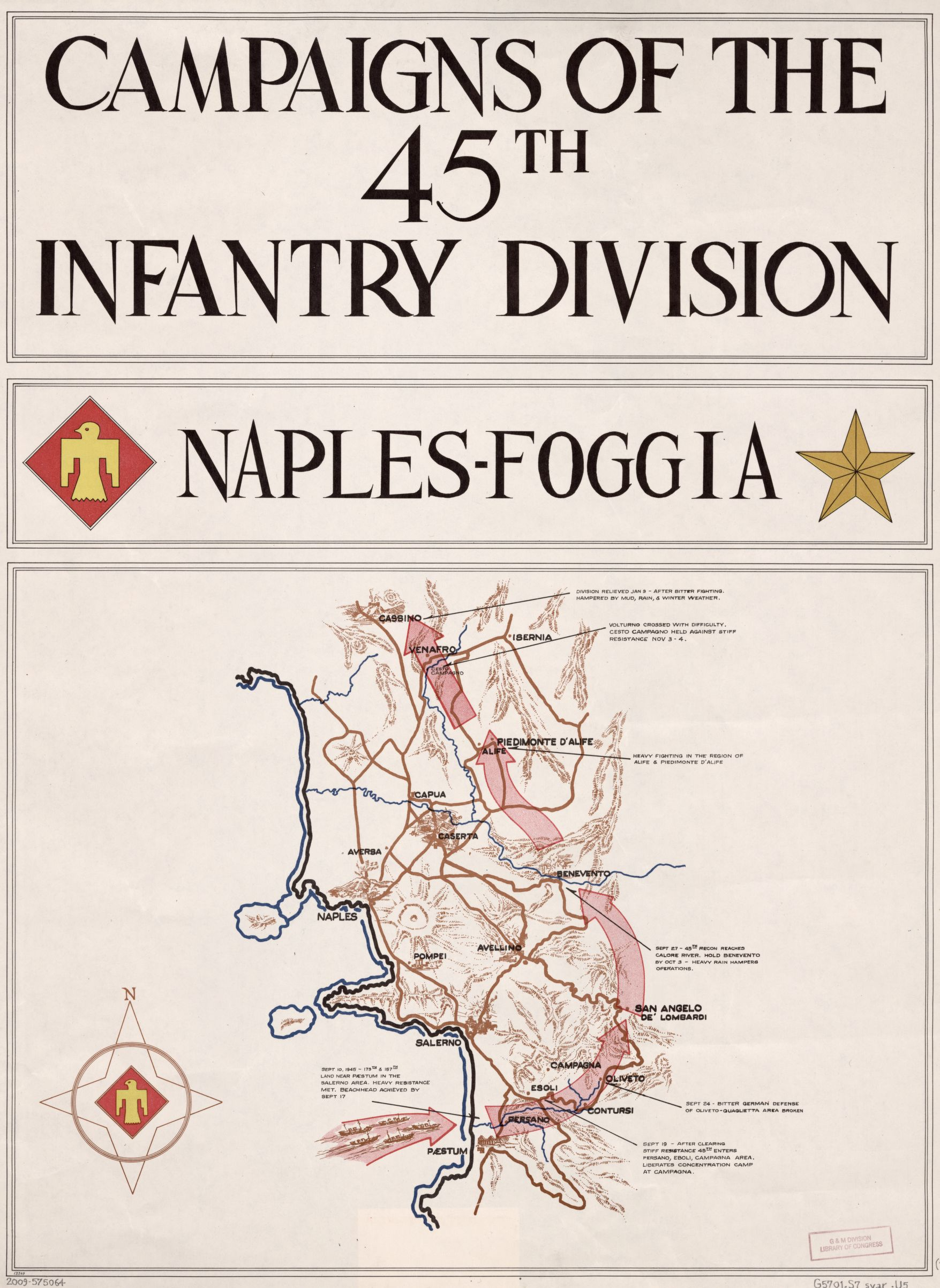
Naples-Foggia

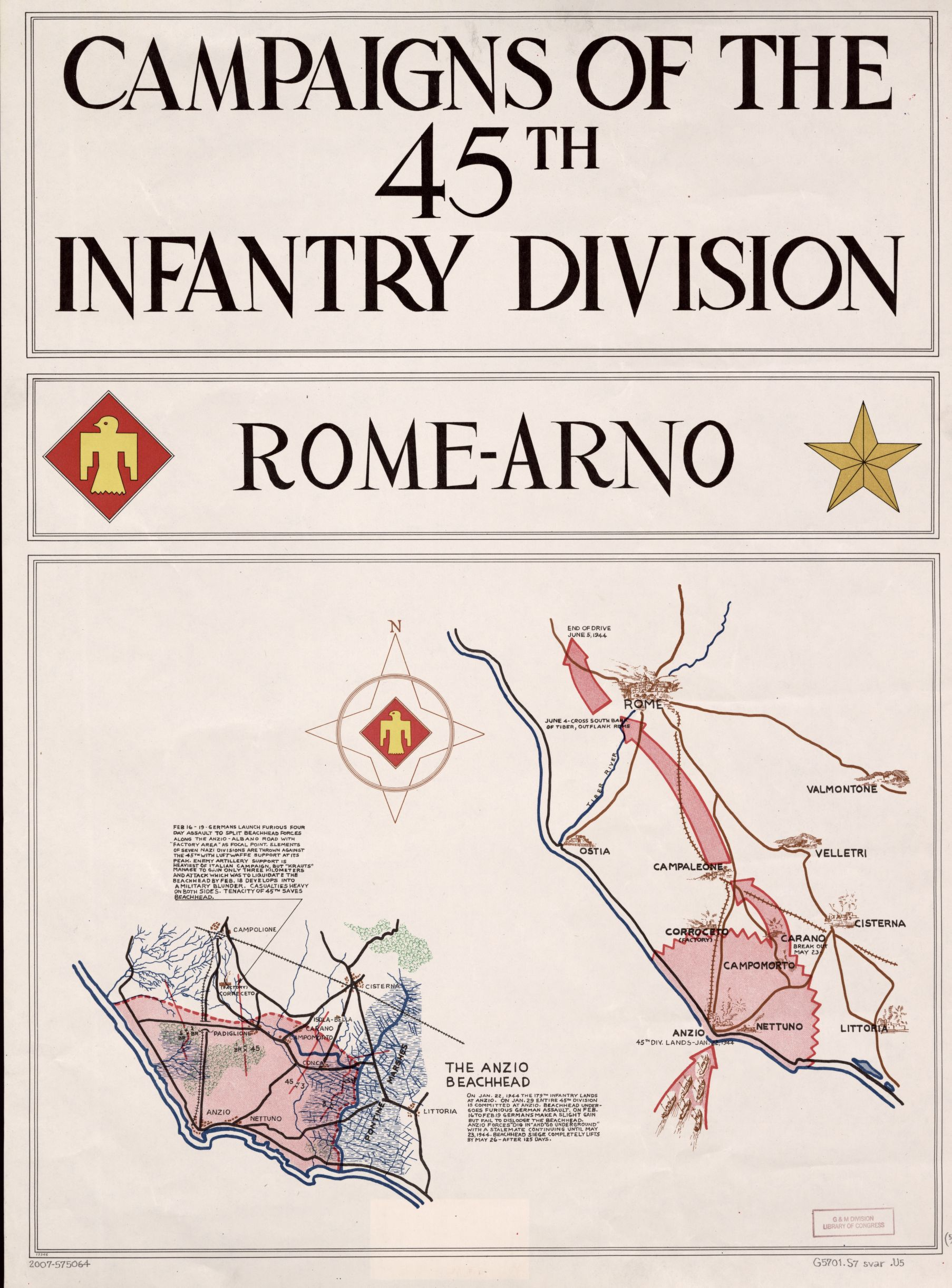
Rome-Arno

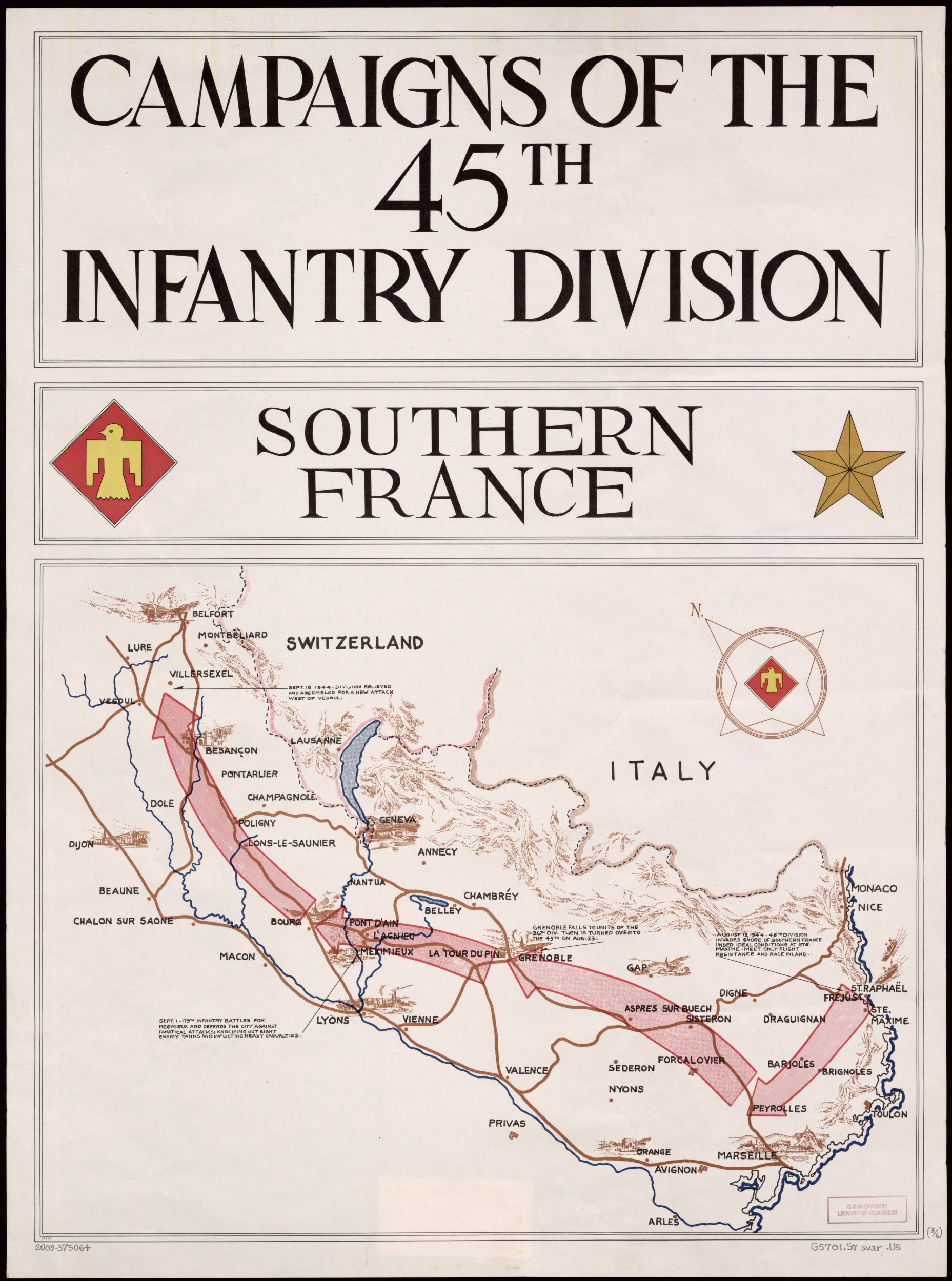
Southern France

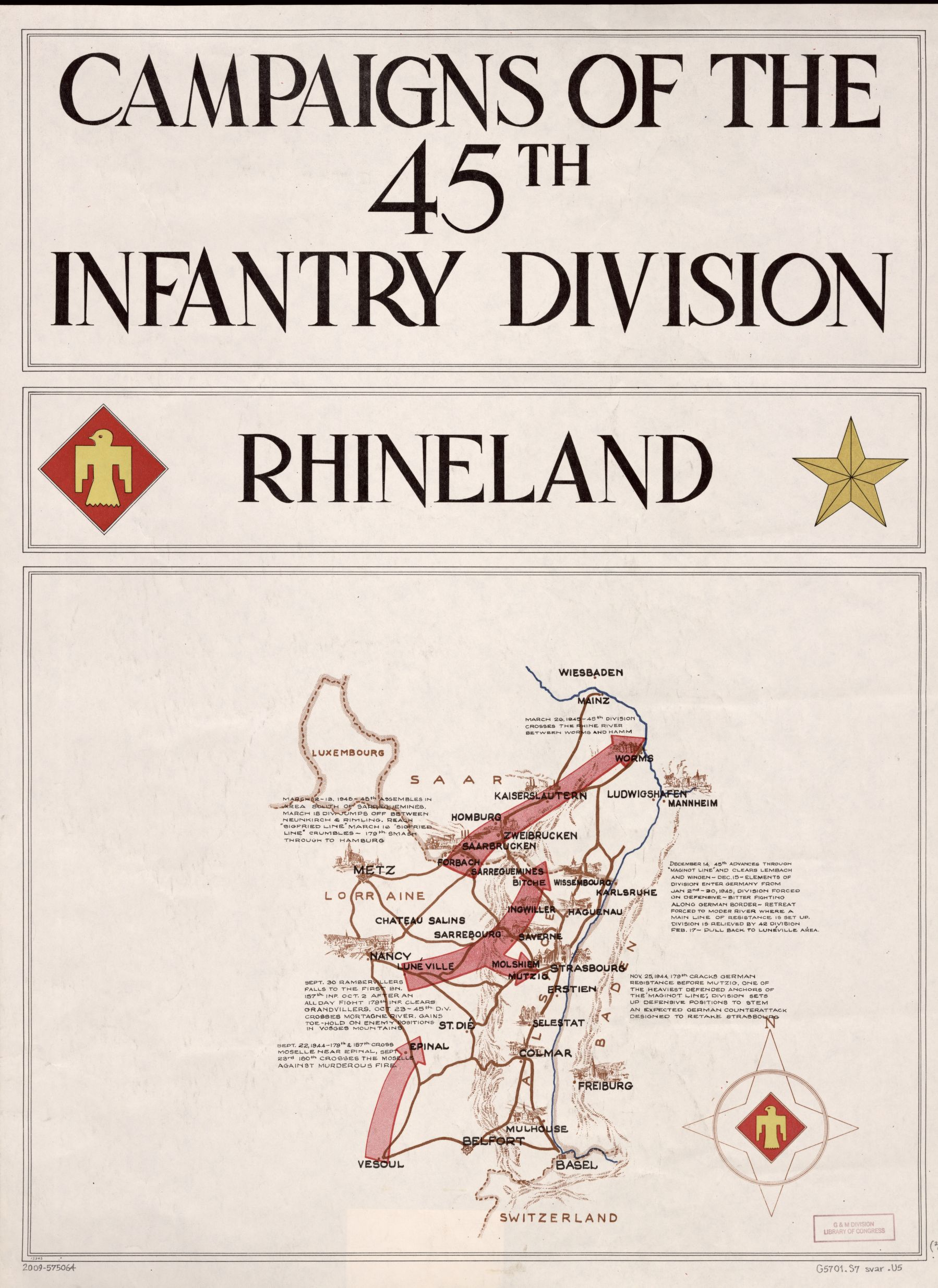
Rhineland

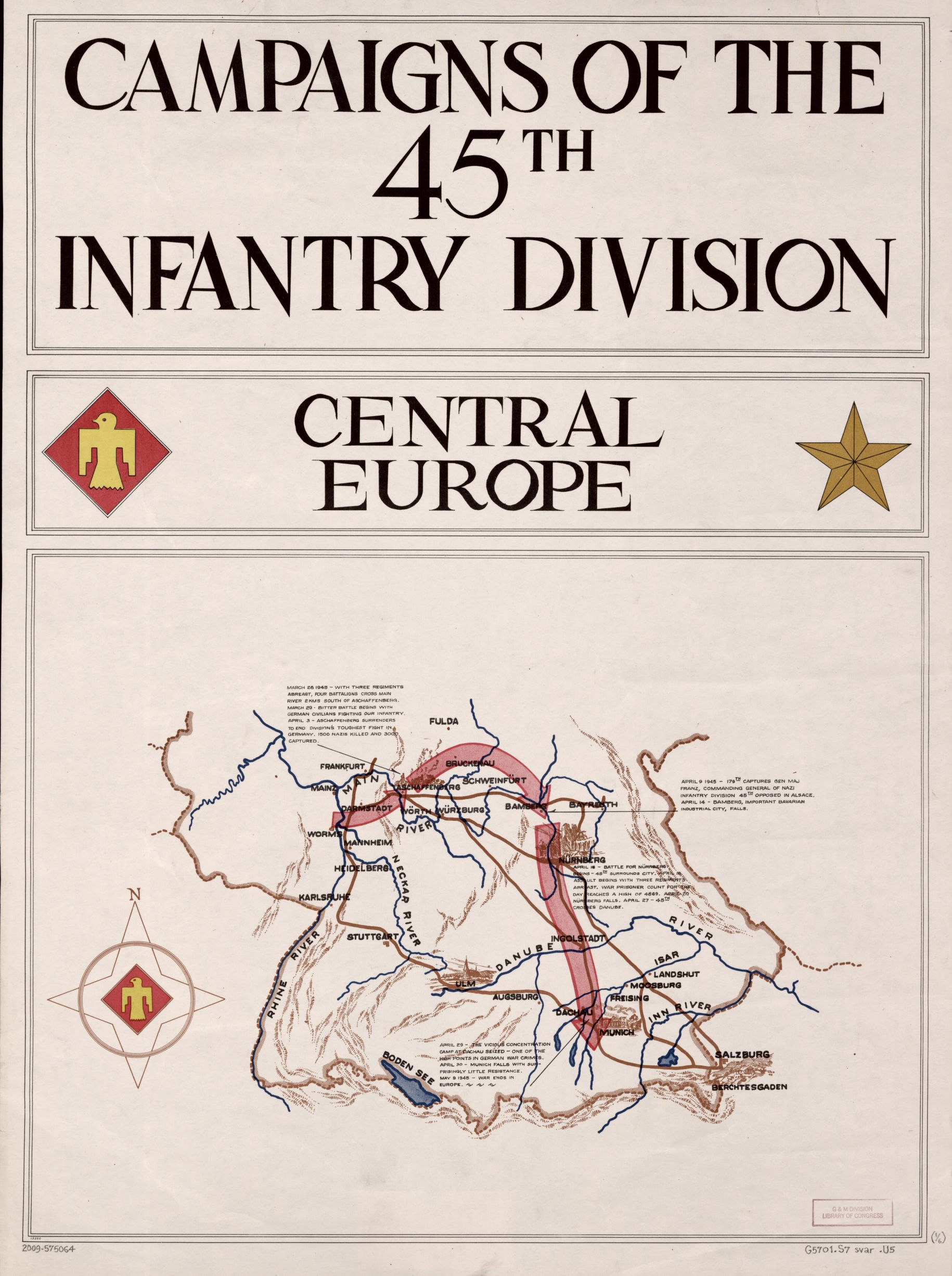
Central Europe

===== Sicily =====
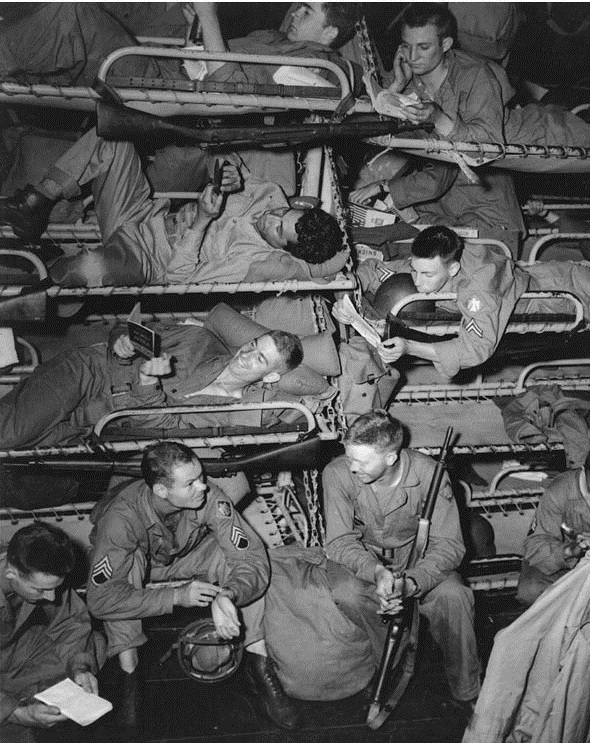
Troops of the 45th Infantry Division in a transport bound for Sicily, June 1943

The 45th Division sailed from the Hampton Roads Port of Embarkation for the Mediterranean region on 8 June 1943, combat loaded aboard thirteen attack transports and five cargo attack vessels as convoy UGF-9 headed by the communications ship USS Ancon. By the time the 45th Division landed in North Africa on 22 June 1943, the Allies had largely secured the African theater. As a result, the division was not sent into combat upon arrival and instead commenced training at Arzew, French Morocco, in preparation for the invasion of Sicily. Allied intelligence estimated that the island was defended by approximately 230,000 troops, the majority of which were drawn mostly from weak Italian formations and two German divisions which had been reconstituted after being destroyed earlier. Against this, the Allies planned to land 180,000 troops, including the 45th Infantry Division, which was assigned to Lieutenant General Omar Bradley's II Corps, part of the U.S. Seventh Army under Lieutenant General George S. Patton, for the operation.

The division was subsequently assigned a lead role in the amphibious assault on Sicily, coming ashore on 10 July. Landing near Scoglitti, the southernmost U.S. objective on the island, the division advanced north on the U.S. force's eastern flank. After initially encountering resistance from armor of the Hermann Goering Division, the division advanced, supported by paratroopers of the 505th Parachute Regimental Combat Team, part of the 82nd Airborne Division, who landed inland on 11 July. The paratroopers, conducting their first combat jump of the war after six weeks of training in Tunisia, then set up to protect the 45th's flank against German counterattack, but without weapons to counter heavy armor, the paratroopers had to rely on support from the 2nd Armored Division to repulse the German Tiger I tanks. As the division advanced towards its main objective to capture the airfields at Biscari, and Comiso, German forces were pushed back. For most of the first two weeks while the division moved slowly north, it encountered only light resistance from Italian forces fighting delaying actions. Italian and German forces resisted fiercely at Motta Hill on 26 July, however, and for four days the 45th Division was held up there. After this, the division was allocated to drive towards Messina, being ordered by the Seventh Army commander to cover the distance as quickly as possible. The 45th Division spent a few days in that city, but on 1 August, the division was withdrawn from the front line for rest and rear-guard patrol duty, after which the division was assigned to Major General Ernest J. Dawley's VI Corps, part of the U.S. Fifth Army, under Lieutenant General Mark W. Clark, in preparation for the invasion of mainland Italy.

===== Salerno =====
On 3 September 1943, Italy surrendered to the Allied powers. Hoping to occupy as much of the country as possible before the German Army could react, the U.S. Fifth Army prepared to attack Salerno. On 10 September, elements of the division conducted its second landing at Agropoli and Paestum with the 36th Infantry Division, on the southernmost beaches of the attack. Opposing them were elements of the German 29th Panzergrenadier Division and XVI Panzer Corps. Against stiff resistance, the 45th pushed to the Calore River after a week of heavy fighting. The Fifth Army was battered and pushed back by German forces until 20 September, when Allied forces were finally able to break out and establish a more secure beachhead.

On 3 November it crossed the Volturno River and took Venafro. The division had great difficulty moving across the rivers and through the mountainous terrain, and the advance was slow. After linking up with the British Eighth Army, which had advanced from the south, the combined force, under the 15th Army Group, commanded by British General Sir Harold Alexander, was stalled when it reached the Gustav Line. Until 9 January 1944, the division, now under Major General William W. Eagles (replacing Major General Middleton who struck down with arthritis, was sent to England to command VIII Corps in the Normandy invasion), inched forward into the mountains reaching St. Elia, north of Monte Cassino, before moving to a rest area.

===== Anzio =====
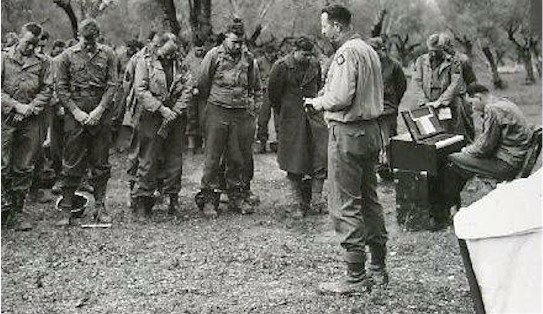
Chaplain Lieutenant Colonel William King leads troops of the 45th in Christmas Day services in Italy, 25 December 1943.

Allied forces conducted a frontal assault on the Gustav Line stronghold at Monte Cassino, and VI Corps, under Major General John P. Lucas from 20 September, was assigned to Operation Shingle, detached from the 15th Army Group to land behind enemy lines at Anzio on 22 January 1944. For this mission, CCA (Combat Command A) of the 1st Armored Division was attached to the 45th Infantry Division. Landing on schedule, VI Corps surprised the Germans, but Major General Lucas's decision to consolidate the beachhead instead of attacking gave the Germans time to bring the LXXVI Panzer Corps forward to oppose the landings.

One regiment of the 45th (the 179th Infantry) went ashore with the landings. In company with the British 1st Infantry Division, they advanced north along the Anzio-Albano road and captured the Aprilia "factory", but encountered ingrained resistance from German armored units a few miles further on. Lucas then ordered the rest of the division ashore. The 45th Division was deployed on the southeastern side of the beachhead, along the lower Mussolini Canal.

On 30 January 1944, when VI Corps advanced from the beaches, it encountered heavy resistance and took heavy casualties. VI Corps was stopped at the "Pimlott Line" (the perimeter of the beachhead), and the fight became a battle of attrition.

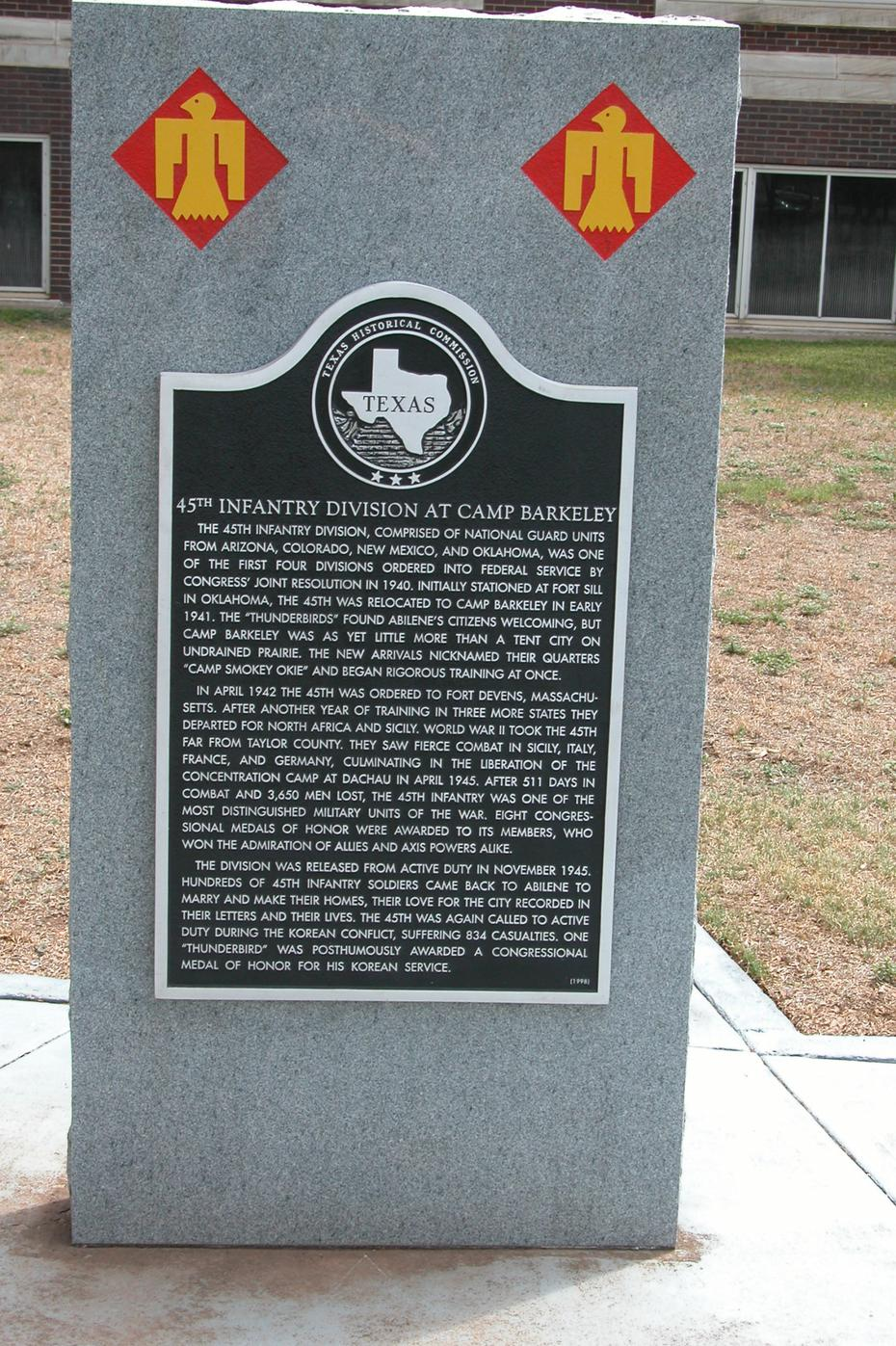
A monument in Abilene, Texas, commemorating the 45th Infantry Division's time in Texas as it trained at Camp Barkeley in 1940

The first major German counterattack came in early February and was against the British 1st Division. Two regiments of the 45th (the 179th and 157th Infantry) were sent to the Aprilia sector to reinforce the British. The 179th Infantry and a tank battalion of CCA tried to recapture Aprilia but were repulsed. Lucas then moved the rest of the 45th Division to the left-center of the perimeter, at Aprilia and along the west branch of the Mussolini Canal. For the next few months the 45th Infantry Division was mostly stuck in place, holding its ground during repeated German counterattacks, and subjected to bombardment from aircraft and artillery.

On 16 February, a major German attack struck the 45th and nearly broke through the 179th Infantry on 18 February. Lucas sent famed U.S. Army Ranger leader Colonel William Orlando Darby to assume command of the 157th Infantry, and the Germans were repulsed. The next three months were spent on the defensive, with the 45th engaged in trench warfare, alike to that in World War I.

On 23 May, VI Corps, now commanded by Major General Lucian Truscott, went on the offensive, breaking out of the beachhead to the northeast, with the 45th Division forming the left half of the attack. By 31 May, the German defenses were shattered, and the 45th Division turned northwest, toward the Alban Hills and Rome. On 4 June the 45th Division crossed the Tiber River below Rome, and entered the city along with other VI Corps troops. Men of the 45th Division were the first Allied troops to reach the Vatican.

On 16 June, the 45th Division withdrew for rest in preparation for other operations. At this time, VI Corps was attached to the Seventh Army, under Lieutenant General Alexander Patch, itself part of the Sixth United States Army Group under Lieutenant General Jacob L. Devers. The 45th, 36th, and 3rd Infantry Divisions were pulled from the line in Italy in preparation for Operation Dragoon (formerly Anvil), the invasion of southern France. Dragoon was originally planned to coincide with the Normandy landings in the north, but was delayed until August because of a shortage of landing craft.

===== France and Germany =====
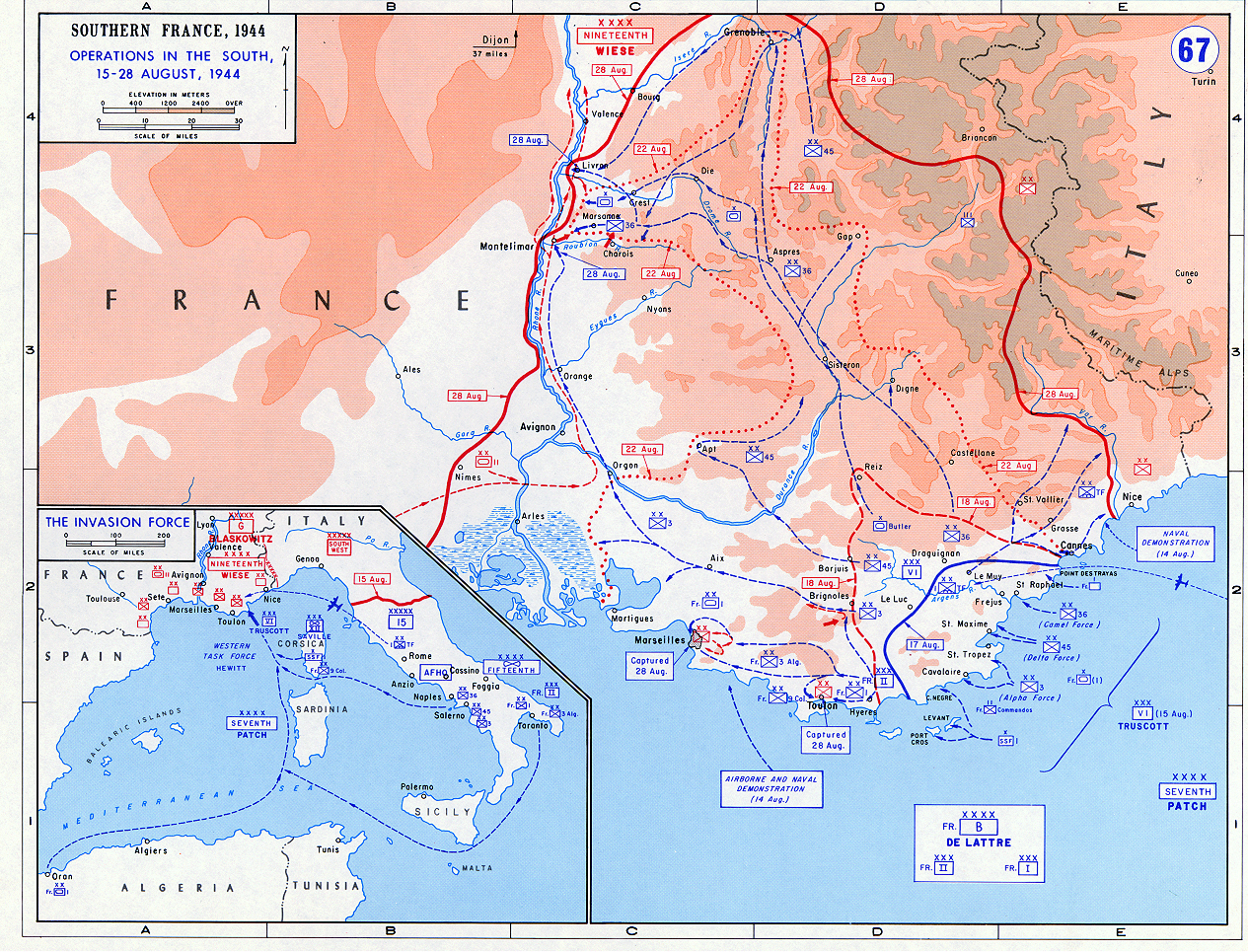
A map of southern France with the 45th Infantry Division landing at the center of a large invasion force

The 45th Infantry Division participated in its fourth amphibious assault landing during Operation Dragoon on 15 August 1944, at St. Maxime, in Southern France. The 45th Infantry Division landed its 157th and 180th regimental combat teams and captured the heights of the Chaines de Mar before meeting with the 1st Special Service Force. The German Army, reeling from the Battle of Normandy, in which it had suffered a major defeat, pulled back after a short fight, part of an overall German withdrawal to the east following the landings. Soldiers of the 45th Infantry Division engaged the dispersed forces of German Army Group G, suffering very few casualties. The U.S. Seventh Army, along with Free French forces, were able to advance north quickly. By 12 September, the Seventh Army linked up with Lieutenant General George S. Patton's U.S. Third Army, advancing from Normandy, joining the two forces at Dijon. Against slight opposition, it spearheaded the drive for the Belfort Gap. The 45th Infantry Division took the strongly defended city of Epinal on 24 September. On 30 September the division crossed the Moselle River and entered the western foothills of the Vosges, taking Rambervillers. It would remain in the area for a month waiting for other units to catch up before crossing the Mortagne River on 23 October. The division remained on the line with the U.S. 6th Army Group the southernmost of three army groups advancing through France.

After the crossing was complete, the division was relieved from V Corps and assigned to Major General Wade H. Haislip's XV Corps. The division was allowed a one-month rest, resuming its advance on 25 November, attacking the forts north of Mutzig. These forts had been designed by Kaiser Wilhelm II in 1893 to block access to the plain of Alsace. The 45th Division next crossed the Zintzel River before pushing through the Maginot Line defenses. During this time much of the division's artillery assets were attached to the 44th Infantry Division to provide additional support. The 45th Infantry Division, now commanded by Major General Robert T. Frederick, who had previously commanded the 1st Special Service Force, was reassigned to VI Corps on New Year's Day. From 2 January 1945, the division fought defensively along the German border, withdrawing to the Moder River. It sent half of its artillery to support the 70th Infantry Division. On 17 February the division was pulled off the line for rest and training. Once this rest period was complete, the division was assigned to XV Corps for the final push into German territory. The 45th moved north to the Sarreguemines area and smashed through the Siegfried Line, on 17 March taking Homburg on the 21st and crossing the Rhine between Worms and Hamm on the 26th. The advance continued, with Aschaffenburg falling on 3 April, and Nuremberg on the 20th. The division crossed the Danube River on 27 April, and liberated 32,000 captives of the Dachau concentration camp on 29 April 1945. The division captured Munich during the next two days, occupying the city until V-E Day and the surrender of Germany. During the next month, the division remained in Munich and set up collection points and camps for the massive numbers of surrendering troops of the German armies. The number of POWs taken by the 45th Division during its almost two years of fighting totalled 124,840 men. The division was then slated to move to the Pacific theater of operations to participate in the invasion of mainland Japan on the island of Honshu, but these plans were scrubbed before the division could depart after the surrender of Japan, on V-J Day.

==== Casualties ====
World War II Casualties

- Total battle casualties: 20,993
- Killed in action: 3,547
- Wounded in action: 14,441
- Missing in action: 478
- Prisoner of war: 2,527

==== Allegations of war crimes ====
During and after the war, courts-martial were convened to investigate possible war crimes by members of the division. In the first two cases, dubbed the Biscari massacre, occurred on 14 July 1943, American troops from C Company, 180th Infantry Regiment, were alleged to have shot 74 Italian and two German prisoners in Acate following the capture of an airfield in the area. George Patton, the Seventh Army commanding general, asked Omar Bradley, II Corps commanding general, to get the cases dismissed to prevent bad press, but Bradley refused. A non-commissioned officer, Sergeant Horace T. West, 33 years old, later confessed to the crimes in the first incident and was found guilty. On the second incident, Captain John T. Compton ordered Italian soldiers to be lined up and shot; the officer claimed he had only been following orders and was acquitted.

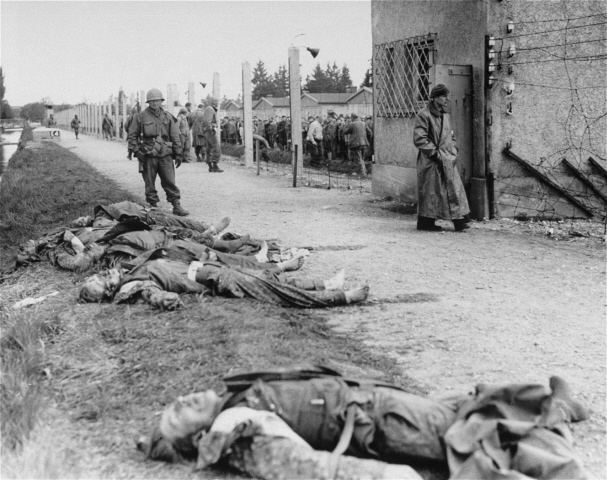
Dead German troops at Dachau Concentration Camp, allegedly killed in the Dachau massacre in 1945

In a third incident, the Army considered court-martialling several officers of the 157th Infantry Regiment under Lieutenant Colonel Felix L. Sparks after servicemen were accused of massacring German soldiers who were surrendering at the Dachau concentration camp in 1945. Some of the German troops were camp guards; the others were sick and wounded troops from a nearby hospital. The soldiers of the 45th Division who liberated the camp were outraged at the malnourishment and maltreatment of the 32,000 prisoners they liberated, some barely alive, and all victims of the Holocaust. After entering the camp, the soldiers found boxcars filled with dead bodies of prisoners who had succumbed to starvation or last-minute executions, and in rooms adjacent to gas chambers they found naked bodies piled from the floor to the ceiling. The cremation ovens, which were still in operation when the soldiers arrived, contained bodies and skeletons as well. Some of the victims apparently had died only hours before the 45th Division entered the camp, while many others lay where they had died in states of decomposition that overwhelmed the soldiers' senses. Accounts conflict over what happened and over how many German troops were killed. After investigating the incident, the Army considered court-martialling several officers involved, but Patton successfully intervened. The Seventh Army was being disbanded and Patton had been appointed Military Governor of Bavaria, placing the matter in his hands. Some veterans of the 45th Infantry Division have said that only 30 to 50 German soldiers were killed and that very few were killed trying to surrender, while others have admitted to killing or refusing to treat wounded German guards.

Confessed murderer Frank Sheeran later recalled his war service with the 45th as the time when he first developed a callousness to the taking of human life. Sheeran claimed to have participated in numerous massacres and summary executions of German POWs, acts which violated the Hague Conventions of 1899 and 1907 and the 1929 Geneva Convention on POWs. In later interviews with Charles Brandt, he divided such massacres into four categories:

- Revenge killings in the heat of battle. Sheeran told Brandt that, when a German soldier had just killed his close friends and then tried to surrender, he would often "send him to hell, too". He described often witnessing similar behavior by fellow GIs.
- Orders from unit commanders during a mission. When describing his first murder for organized crime, Sheeran recalled: "It was just like when an officer would tell you to take a couple of German prisoners back behind the line and for you to 'hurry back'. You did what you had to do."
- The Dachau massacre and other reprisal killings of concentration camp guards and trustee inmates.
- Calculated attempts to dehumanize and degrade German POWs. While Sheeran's unit was climbing the Harz Mountains, they came upon a Wehrmacht mule train carrying food and drink up the mountainside. The female cooks were first allowed to leave unmolested, then Sheeran and his fellow GIs "ate what we wanted and soiled the rest with our waste". Then the Wehrmacht mule drivers were given shovels and ordered to "dig their own shallow graves". Sheeran later joked that they did so without complaint, likely hoping that he and his buddies would change their minds. But the mule drivers were shot and buried in the holes they had dug. Sheeran explained that by then, he "had no hesitation in doing what I had to do."

=== After WWII ===
Callsigns of the 45th Division
  - 45TH DIV..............POWER
  - 45TH DIV ARTY...PARASOL
  - 189TH FA BN.......PARK
  - 160TH FA BN.......PATIENCE
  - 158TH FA BN.......POLISH
  - 171ST FA BN.......POST
  - 157TH INF RGT...POISON (WWII)
  - 179TH INF RGT...PAGAN
  - 180TH INF RGT...PASSPORT
  - 279TH INF RGT...POISON (KOREA)
  Battalions of the Infantry Regiments
  - 1st INF BN............RED
  - 2nd INF BN...........WHITE
  - 3rd INF BN............BLUE
  Regimental Tanks and Mortars
  - TANK CO.............GREEN
  - MORTAR CO........BROWN

During World War II, the 45th Division fought in 511 days of combat. Nine soldiers were awarded the Medal of Honor during their service with the 45th Infantry Division: Van T. Barfoot, Ernest Childers, Almond E. Fisher, William J. Johnston, Salvador J. Lara, Jack C. Montgomery, James D. Slaton, Jack Treadwell, and Edward G. Wilkin. Soldiers of the division also received 61 Distinguished Service Crosses, three Distinguished Service Medals, 1,848 Silver Star Medals, 38 Legion of Merit medals, 59 Soldier's Medals, 5,744 Bronze Star Medals, and 52 Air Medals. The division received seven distinguished unit citations and eight campaign streamers during the conflict.

Most of the division returned to New York in September 1945, and from there went to Camp Bowie, Texas. On 7 December 1945, the division was inactivated from the active duty force and its members reassigned to other Army units. The following year, on 10 September 1946, the 45th Infantry Division was reconstituted as a National Guard unit. Instead of comprising units from several states, the post-war 45th was an all-Oklahoma organization. During this time the division was also reorganized and as a part of this process the 157th Infantry was removed from the division's order of battle and replaced with the 279th Infantry Regiment.

During this time, the U.S. Army underwent a drastic reduction in size. At the end of World War II, it contained 89 divisions, but by 1950, there were just 10 active divisions in the force, along with a few reserve divisions such as the 45th Infantry Division which were combat-ineffective. The division retained many of its best officers as senior commanders as the force downsized, and it enjoyed a good relationship with its community. The 45th in this time was regarded as one of the better-trained National Guard divisions. Regardless, by mid-1950 the division had only 8,413 troops, less than 45 percent (Note: As of 1 August 1950, the division consisted of 698 commissioned officers, 64 warrant officers, and 7,651 enlisted men. Army doctrine dictated a fully manned infantry division of 910 officers, 132 warrant officers, and 17,460 enlisted men. The National Guard at the time was operating at a reduced authorization of 851 officers, 130 enlisted men, and 12,777 enlisted men. See Donnelly 2001, p. 92.) of its full-strength authorization. Only 10 percent of the division's officers and five percent of its enlisted men had combat experience with the division from World War II.

=== Korean War ===
At the outbreak of the Korean War in June 1950, the U.S. Army looked to expand its force again to prepare for major conflict. After the North Korean People's Army invaded the Republic of Korea, four understrength U.S. divisions on occupation duty in Japan were rushed to South Korea to stand alongside the Republic of Korea Army. These were the 7th Infantry Division, the 1st Cavalry Division, the 24th Infantry Division, and the 25th Infantry Division, which were all under the control of the Eighth United States Army. Due to drastic reductions in U.S. military spending following the end of World War II, these divisions were equipped with worn-out or obsolete weaponry and suffered from a shortage of anti-armor weapons capable of penetrating the hulls of the North Korean T-34 tanks.

On 1 September 1950, the 45th Infantry Division was ordered into federal service. It would eventually become the first National Guard division to be deployed to the Far East since World War II.

==== Reinforcement pool ====
Initially, the division was used to provide a pool of reinforcements for the divisions fighting in Korea; in January 1951 it provided 650 enlisted fillers for overseas service. Later that month, 4,006 new recruits were assigned to its three infantry regiments and artillery assets, with each unit creating a 14-week training program to prepare the new soldiers for combat. Because of heavy casualties and slow reinforcement rates, the Army looked to the National Guard to provide additional units to relieve the beleaguered Eighth Army. At the time, the 45th Infantry Division was comprised overwhelmingly of high school students or recent graduates, and only about 60 percent of its troops had conducted training and drills with the division for a year or more. Additionally, only about 20 percent of its personnel had prior experience of military service from World War II. Nevertheless, the division was one of four National Guard divisions identified as being among the most prepared for combat based on the effectiveness of its equipment, training, and leadership. As a result, in February 1951, the 45th Infantry Division was alerted that it would sail for Japan.

In preparation for the deployment, the division was sent to Fort Polk, Louisiana, to begin training and to fill its ranks. After its basic training was complete, the division was sent to Japan in April 1951 for advanced training and to act as a reserve force for the Eighth United States Army, then fighting in Korea. The involvement of the National Guard in the fighting in Korea was further expanded when the 40th Infantry Division of the California Army National Guard received warning orders for deployment as well.

==== Initial struggles ====
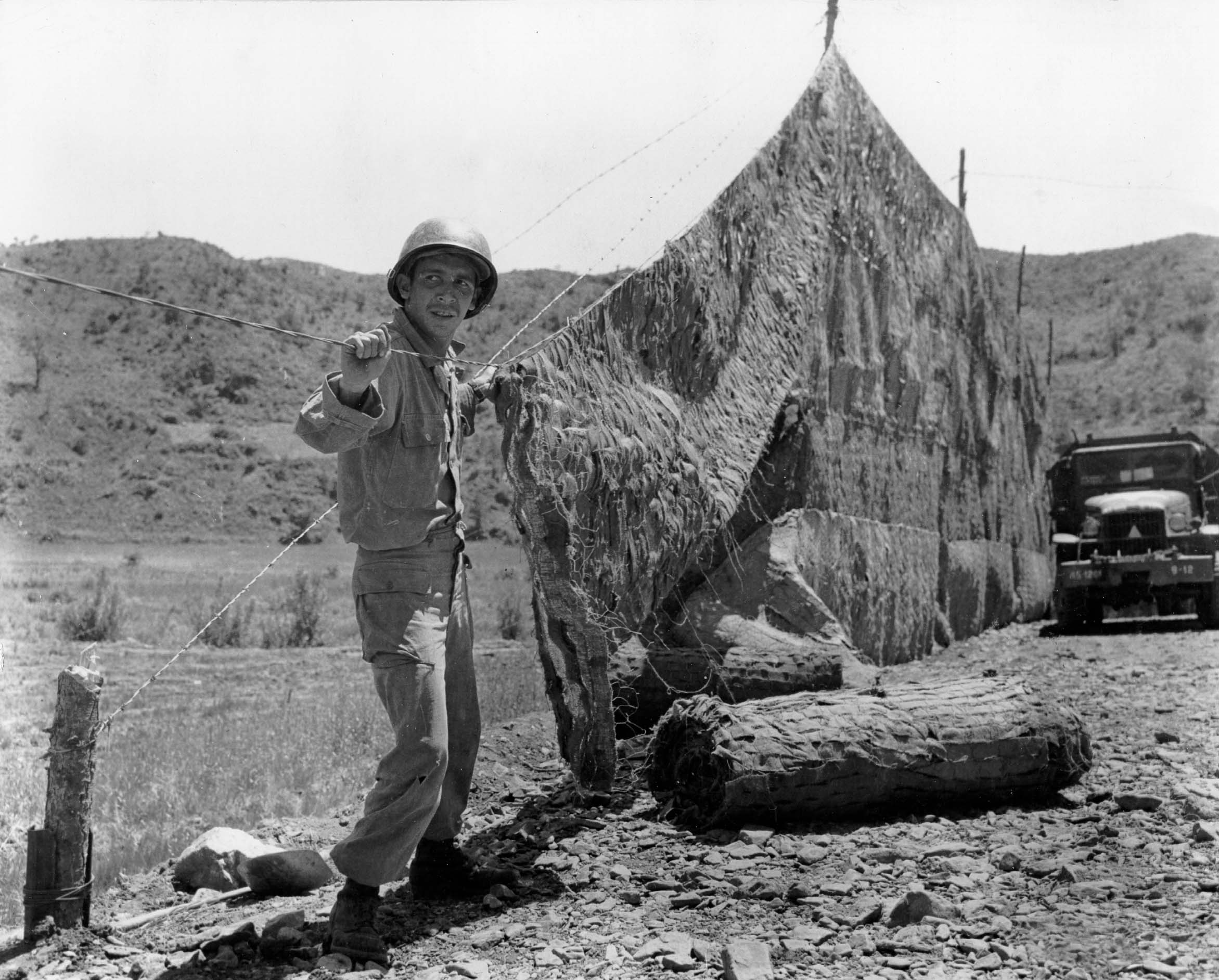
A soldier of the 120th Engineer Battalion, 45th Infantry Division sets up camouflage net near the front lines in Korea in 1952.

The division did not actually deploy to Korea until December 1951, when its advanced training was complete. By the time it arrived in Korea, only half the division's manpower were National Guard troops. Though the 45th remained de facto segregated as an all-white unit in 1950, individual unit commanders went to great lengths to integrate reinforcements from different areas and ethnicities into their units. By 1952, it was fully integrated. Following its arrival, the division moved to the front line to replace the 1st Cavalry Division, which was then delegated to the Far East reserve, having suffered over 16,000 casualties in less than 18 months of fighting.

Additionally, in an effort to reduce the burden on the National Guard, (Note: Fearing political ramifications, Army leaders sought to prevent large numbers of casualties from any one state; the 45th Infantry Division still having many troops from Oklahoma as an example. See: Donnelly 2001, p. 122) the term of service for National Guardsmen in Korea was initially set at 21, and later 24 months; over 4,500 Guardsmen left between May and July 1952, continually replaced by more active-duty troops and draftees, including an increasing number of African Americans. In August 1952, Congress approved a law authorizing the organization of "National Guard of the United States" (NGUS) units in states whose National Guard units were in federal service, which would bear the same designations as those on active duty. Before the establishment of the 45th Infantry Division (NGUS) on 15 September 1952, the returning Oklahoma Guardsmen were either separated from the service if their Guard enlistments had expired, or remained in inactive reserve status. As a result of this effort, two 45th Infantry Division units existed between 1952 and 1954; the National Guard 45th Infantry Division in Korea, and the 45th Infantry Division (NGUS) in Oklahoma.

By the time the division was in place, the battle lines on both sides had largely solidified, leaving the 45th Infantry Division in a stationary position as it conducted attacks and counterattacks for the same ground. The division was put under the command of the Eighth Army's I Corps for most of the conflict. It was deployed around Chorwon and assigned to protect the key routes from that area into Seoul. The terrain was difficult and the weather was poor in the region. The division suffered its first casualty on 11 December 1951.

Initially, the division did not fare well, though it improved quickly. Its anti-aircraft and armor assets were used as mobile artillery, which continuously pounded Chinese positions. The 45th, in turn, was under constant artillery and mortar attack. It also conducted constant small-unit patrols along the border seeking to engage Chinese outposts or patrols. These small-unit actions made up the majority of the division's combat in Korea. Chinese troops were well dug-in and better trained than the troops of the inexperienced 45th, and it suffered casualties and frequently had to disengage when it was attacked.

In the division's first few months on the line, Chinese forces conducted three raids in its sector. In retaliation, the 245th Tank Battalion sent nine tanks to raid Agok. Two companies of Chinese forces ambushed and devastated a patrol from the 179th Infantry a short time later. In the spring, the division launched Operation Counter, which was an effort to establish 11 patrol bases around Old Baldy Hill. The division then defended the hill against a series of Chinese assaults from the Chinese 38th Army.

==== End of the war ====
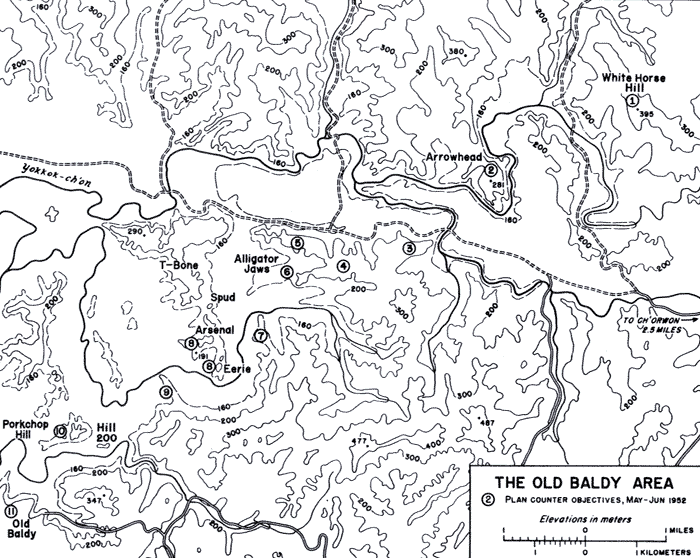
Map of the area surrounding Old Baldy Hill, which the division defended for much of its tour in Korea

The 45th Infantry Division, along with the 7th Infantry Division, fought off repeated Chinese attacks all along the front line throughout 1952, and Chinese forces frequently attacked Old Baldy Hill into the fall of that year. Around that time, the 45th Infantry Division relinquished command of Old Baldy Hill to the 2nd Infantry Division. Almost immediately the Chinese launched a concentrated attack on the hill, overrunning the U.S. forces. Heavy rainstorms prevented the divisions from retaking the hill for around a month, and when it was finally retaken it was heavily fortified to prevent further attacks. The 245th Tank Battalion was sent to assault Chinese positions throughout late 1952, but most of the division held a stationary defensive line against the Chinese.

In early 1953, North Korean forces launched a large-scale attack against Hill 812, which was then under the control of K Company, 3rd Battalion, 179th Infantry. The ensuing Battle of Hill Eerie was one of a series of larger attacks by Chinese and North Korean forces which produced heavier fighting than the previous year had seen. These offensives were conducted largely in order to secure a better position during the ongoing truce negotiations. Chinese forces continued to mount concentrated attacks on the lines of the UN forces, including the 45th Infantry Division, but the division managed to hold most of its ground, remaining stationary until the end of the war in the summer of 1953.

During the Korean War, the 45th Infantry Division suffered 4,004 casualties, consisting of 834 killed in action and 3,170 wounded in action. The division was awarded four campaign streamers and one Presidential Unit Citation. One soldier from the division, Charles George, was awarded the Medal of Honor while serving in Korea.

=== After Korea ===
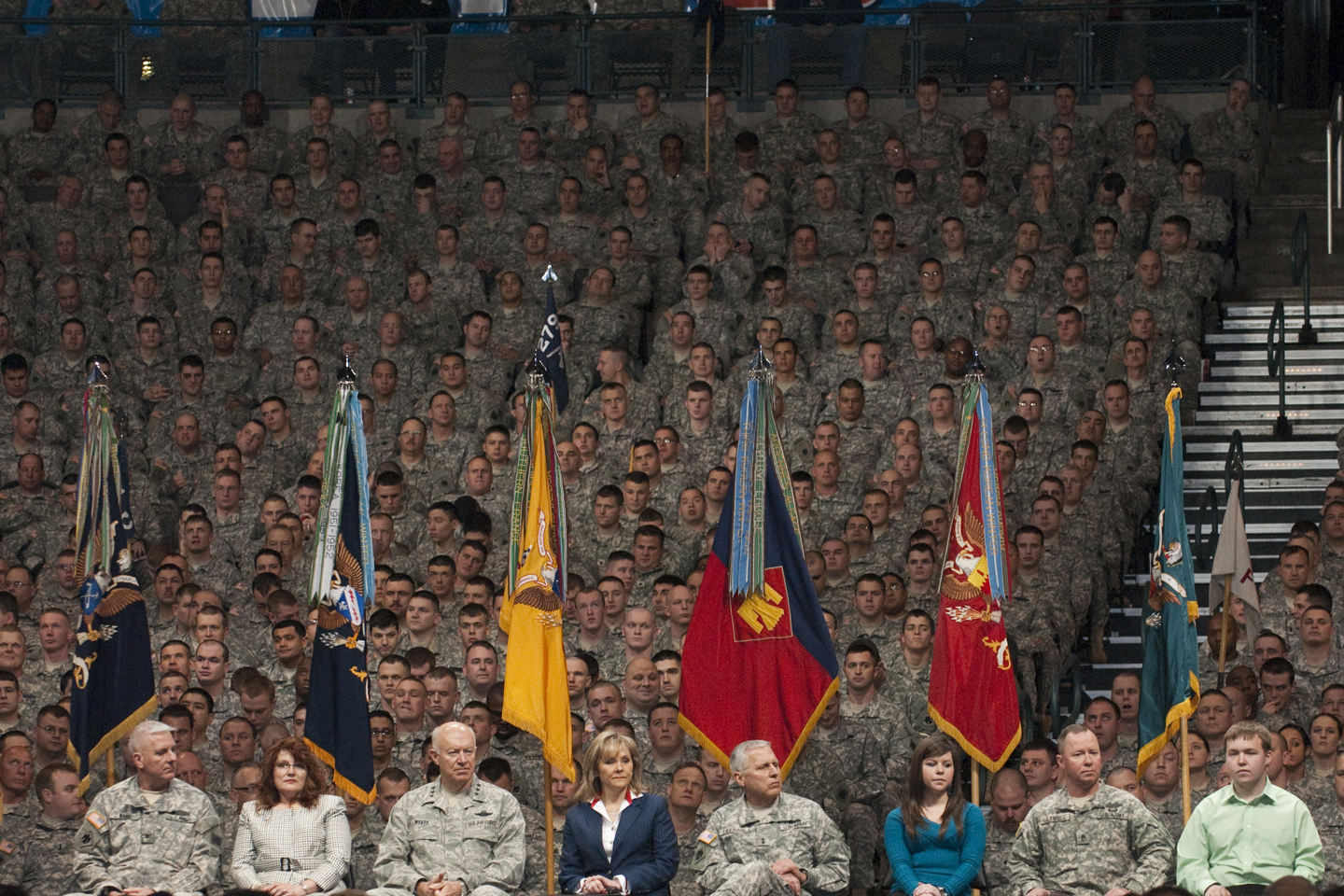
Soldiers of the 45th Infantry Brigade Combat Team, the successor organization to the 45th Infantry Division, hold a ceremony ahead of a deployment to Operation Enduring Freedom in February 2011.

The division briefly patrolled the Korean Demilitarized Zone following the signing of the armistice ending the war, but most of its men returned home and reverted to National Guard status on 30 April 1954. Its colors were returned to Oklahoma on 25 September of that year, formally ending the division's presence in Korea.

The division remained as a unit of the Oklahoma National Guard and participated in no major actions throughout the rest of the 1950s save regular weekend and summer training exercises. In 1963, the formation was reorganized in accordance with the Reorganization Objective Army Divisions plan, which saw the establishment of a 1st, 2nd and 3rd Brigade within the division. These brigades would see no major deployments or events and were inactivated five years later in 1968. That same year, due to the perceived lack of need for so many large formations in the Army National Guard, the 45th Infantry Division was inactivated, as part of a larger move to reduce the number of Army National Guard divisions from 15 to eight, while increasing the number of separate brigades from seven to 18. In its place, the independent 45th Infantry Brigade (Separate) was established. The 45th Infantry Brigade received all of the 45th Division's lineage and heraldry, including its shoulder sleeve insignia. Also activated from division assets were the 45th Field Artillery Group, later redesignated the 45th Fires Brigade, and the 90th Troop Command.

== Honors ==
The 45th Infantry Division was awarded eight campaign streamers and one foreign unit award in World War II and four campaign streamers and one foreign unit award in the Korean War, for a total of twelve campaign streamers and two foreign unit decorations in its operational history.

Streamer	Conflict	Inscription	Year(s)
A red ribbon with four vertical dark green stripes in the center.	French Croix de Guerre, World War II (With Palm)	Embroidered "Acquafondata"	1944
	European-African-Middle Eastern Campaign Streamer	Sicily (with Arrowhead)	1943
	European-African-Middle Eastern Campaign Streamer	Naples–Foggia (with Arrowhead)	1943
	European-African-Middle Eastern Campaign Streamer	Anzio (with Arrowhead)	1943
	European-African-Middle Eastern Campaign Streamer	Rome–Arno	1944
	European-African-Middle Eastern Campaign Streamer	Southern France (with Arrowhead)	1944
	European-African-Middle Eastern Campaign Streamer	Rhineland	1944–45
	European-African-Middle Eastern Campaign Streamer	Central Europe	1945
A white ribbon with vertical green and red stripes on its edges and a red and blue circle in the middle	Republic of Korea Presidential Unit Citation	For service in Korea	1952–53
	Korean Service Campaign Streamer	Second Korean Winter	1951–52
	Korean Service Campaign Streamer	Korea, Summer–Fall 1952	1952
	Korean Service Campaign Streamer	Third Korean Winter	1952–53
	Korean Service Campaign Streamer	Korea, Summer 1953	1953

== Museum ==
The Oklahoma National Guard Museum, located in Oklahoma City, is the nation's largest state-operated military history museum depicting the military history of Oklahoma and the 45th Infantry Division. With displays from 1941 through Desert Storm, the museum includes the country's third-largest collection of historic U.S. military firearms and the world's largest collection of items once owned by Adolf Hitler. Also includes a substantial collection of cartoons by World War II cartoonist Bill Mauldin, who served with it during the war.

== Commanders ==
MG	Baird H. Markham (Oklahoma)	15 Feb 1923	6 Apr 1931
MG	Roy V. Hoffman (Oklahoma)	13 Jun 1931	13 Jun 1933
MG	Alexander M. Tuthill (Arizona)	14 Jun 1933	21 Oct 1935
MG	Charles E. McPherren (Oklahoma)	25 Nov 1935	29 Jul 1936
MG	William S. Key (Oklahoma)	29 Jul 1936	13 Oct 1942
MG	Troy H. Middleton (R.A.)	14 Oct 1942	21 Nov 1943
MG	William W. Eagles (R.A.)	22 Nov 1943	2 Dec 1944
MG	Robert T. Frederick (R.A.)	3 Dec 1944	20 Sep 1945
BG	Paul D. Adams (R.A.)	21 Sep 1945	25 Oct 1945
BG	Henry J. D. Meyer (R.A.)	26 Oct 1945	7 Dec 1945
MG	James C. Styron (Oklahoma)	5 Sep 1946	20 May 1952
MG	David L. Ruffner (R.A.)	21 May 1952	15 Mar 1953
MG	Philip De Witt Ginder (R.A.)	16 Mar 1953	30 Nov 1953
MG	Paul D. Harkins (R.A.)	1 Dec 1953	15 Mar 1954
BG	Harvey H. Fischer (R.A.)	18 Mar 1954	27 Apr 1954
MG	Hal L. Muldrow Jr. (Oklahoma)	10 Sep 1952	31 Aug 1960
MG	Frederick A. Daugherty (Oklahoma)	1 Sep 1960	20 Nov 1964
MG	Jasper N. Baker (Oklahoma)	21 Nov 1964	31 Jan 1968

Note: The similarity of dates of command for General Muldrow and commanders beginning with General Ruffner is because the 45th Infantry Division was retained in federal service as a unit during the Korean War while a duplicate unit, the 45th Infantry Division (NGUS), was authorized to be activated in Oklahoma during its absence.
