= 158th Field Artillery Regiment =

US national guard unit

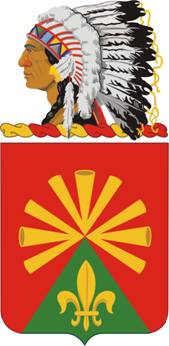
- Coat of arms
- Active: 1920
- Country: United States
- Allegiance: Oklahoma
- Branch: Oklahoma Army National Guard
- Motto(s): UNUSUAL EFFORTS EXPENDED
- Branch color: Scarlet

Insignia
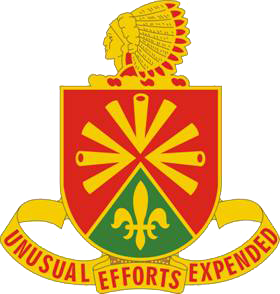
- Distinctive unit insignia

The 158th Field Artillery Regiment is a Field Artillery regiment of the Army National Guard.

== Lineage ==
The 158th Field Artillery was constituted in the National Guard on 26 February 1920 and assigned to the 45th Division. The regimental headquarters, Headquarters Battery, and Service Battery were allotted to Oklahoma, the 1st Battalion was allotted to Colorado and New Mexico, and the 2nd Battalion was allotted to Arizona (Battery E) and Oklahoma (Headquarters Battery and Combat Train, and Battery F). The regimental headquarters was organized and federally recognized on 15 May 1923 at Tulsa, Oklahoma. Elements of the regiment were called up to perform flood relief duties in Oklahoma City, Oklahoma, 13 September–8 October 1923. The regimental headquarters was relocated on 23 September 1925 to Anadarko, Oklahoma.

The 1st Battalion was redesignated the 168th Field Artillery Battalion on 1 July 1926, and assigned to the 24th Cavalry Division, while a new 1st Battalion, 158th Field Artillery was allotted to the state of Oklahoma with the headquarters organized on 20 May 1927 at Kingfisher, Oklahoma. The regiment converted from horse drawn to truck drawn on 2 August 1933. Regimental units conducted annual summer training 1923–39 as follows: Oklahoma elements at Fort Sill; Colorado elements at Camp George West; New Mexico elements at Fort Bliss, Texas, or Camp Maximilliano Luna, New Mexico; Arizona elements at Fort Tuthill. The regiment was inducted into federal service on 16 September 1940, and moved to Fort Sill, Oklahoma, where it arrived on 24 September 1940.

The regiment was broken up on 11 February 1942 and its elements reorganized and redesignated as follows:

- Headquarters and Headquarters Battery disbanded
- 1st Battalion as the 158th Field Artillery Battalion and assigned to the 45th Infantry Division
- 2nd Battalion as the 207th Field Artillery Battalion - hereafter separate lineage

The 158th Field Artillery Battalion was inactivated on 24 November 1945 at Camp Bowie, Texas. It was consolidated on 27 September 1946 with Headquarters, 158th Field Artillery (reconstituted 25 August 1945 in the Oklahoma National Guard), reorganized, and federally recognized as the 158th Field Artillery Battalion with Headquarters at Chickasha. During the Korean War, the battalion was ordered into active federal service on 1 September 1950 at home stations. The 158th Field Artillery Battalion [NGUS] was organized and federally recognized in its stead on 3 November 1952 with Headquarters at Chickasha. The 158th Field Artillery Battalion was released on 30 April 1954 from active federal service and reverted to state control, and federal recognition was concurrently withdrawn from the 158th Field Artillery Battalion (NGUS)

The regiment was reorganized and redesignated on 1 May 1959 as the 158th Artillery, a parent regiment under the U.S. Army Combat Arms Regimental System, to consist of the 1st and 2nd Howitzer Battalions, elements of the 45th Infantry Division. It was reorganized on 1 April 1963 to consist of the 1st Battalion, an element of the 45th Infantry Division, on 1 February 1968 to consist of the 1st Battalion, and on 1 December 1971 to consist of the 1st Field Artillery Battalion,

The regiment was redesignated on 1 May 1972 as the 158th Field Artillery, and reorganized on 1 May 1975 to consist of the 1st and 2nd Battalions, and on 1 April 1977 to consist of the 1st Battalion. The regiment was withdrawn 1 June 1989 from the Combat Arms Regimental System and reorganized under the United States Army Regimental System. The 1st Battalion was ordered into active federal service on 21 November 1990 at home stations, and released on 23 May 1991 from active federal service and reverted to state control. The 1st Battalion was ordered into active federal service on 15 March 2003 at home stations, and released from active Federal service on 27 May 2003 and reverted to state control. The regiment was redesignated on 1 October 2005 as the 158th Field Artillery Regiment. The 1st Battalion was ordered into active Federal service on 19 August 2008 at home stations, and released from active Federal service on 22 September 2009 and reverted to state control; on 1 September 2008, the regiment was reorganized to consist of the 1st Battalion, an element of the 45th Infantry Brigade Combat Team.

== Distinctive unit insignia ==
- Description

A Gold color metal and enamel device 1 1/4 inches (3.2 cm) in height consisting of the shield, crest and motto of the coat of arms.

- Symbolism

The dominant colors, red and yellow, are for Artillery. The broad arrow-a large missile thrown by machine-was an early version of artillery. The three broad arrowheads represent the recognition awarded the organization for service in Sicily, Naples and Southern France. The green wedge symbolizes mountainous Italy, and the fleur-de-lis is for French and Central European service.

- Background

The distinctive unit insignia was originally approved for the 158th Field Artillery Battalion on 14 January 1952. It was redesignated for the 158th Artillery Regiment on 2 November 1960. The insignia was redesignated for the 158th Field Artillery Regiment on 19 July 1972.

== Coat of arms ==
- Blazon
  - Shield: Per chevron debased Gules and Vert, three broad arrows one and two, points meeting at apex of partition line Or, in base a fleur-de-lis of the like.
  - Crest: That for the regiments and separate battalions of the Oklahoma Army National Guard: On a wreath of the colors Or and Gules an Indian's head with war bonnet all Proper.
  - Motto: UNUSUAL EFFORTS EXPENDED.
- Symbolism
  - Shield: The dominant colors, red and yellow, are for Artillery. The broad arrow-a large missile thrown by machine-was an early version of artillery. The three broad arrowheads represent the recognition awarded the organization for service in Sicily, Naples and Southern France. The green wedge symbolizes mountainous Italy, and the fleur-de-lis is for French and Central European service.
  - Crest: The crest is that of the Oklahoma Army National Guard.
- Background: The coat of arms was originally approved for the 158th Field Artillery Battalion on 14 January 1952. It was redesignated for the 158th Artillery Regiment on 2 November 1960. The insignia was redesignated for the 158th Field Artillery Regiment on 19 July 1972.

== Campaign credits ==
- World War II
  - Sicily (with arrowhead)
  - Naples-Foggia (with arrowhead)
  - Anzio
  - Rome-Arno
  - Southern France (with arrowhead)
  - Rhineland
  - Ardennes-Alsace
  - Central Europe
- Korean war
  - Second Korean winter
  - Korea, summer-fall 1952
  - Third Korean winter
  - Korea, summer 1953
- 1990-1991 Desert Shield and Desert Storm
- War on Terrorism (Iraq)
  - Iraqi Surge
  - Iraqi Sovereignty
- Operation Enduring Freedom
  - Afghanistan

== Decorations ==
- French croix de Guerre with Palm, World War II, Streamer embroidered ACQUAFONDATA
- Republic of Korea Presedetial Unit Citation, Streamer embroidered KOREA

== Current units ==
- 1st Battalion, 158th Field Artillery Regiment (assigned to the separate 45th Field Artillery Brigade)
- 2d Battalion, 158th Field Artillery Regiment (inactive)

== See also ==
- Field Artillery Branch (United States)
