= 45th Field Artillery Brigade =

45th Fires Brigade
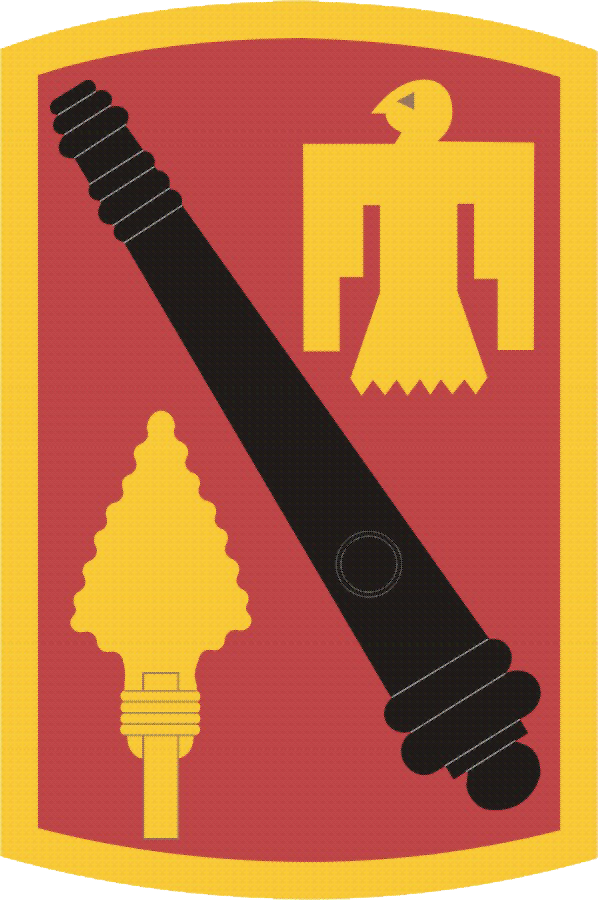
- Shoulder sleeve insignia
- Active: 1968 – present
- Country: United States of America
- Branch: United States Army National Guard
- Type: Fires brigade
- Role: Field artillery, Training
- Size: Brigade
- Part of: Oklahoma Army National Guard
- Garrison/HQ: Mustang, Oklahoma
- Mottos: "Pride, Valor, Excellence"

Insignia
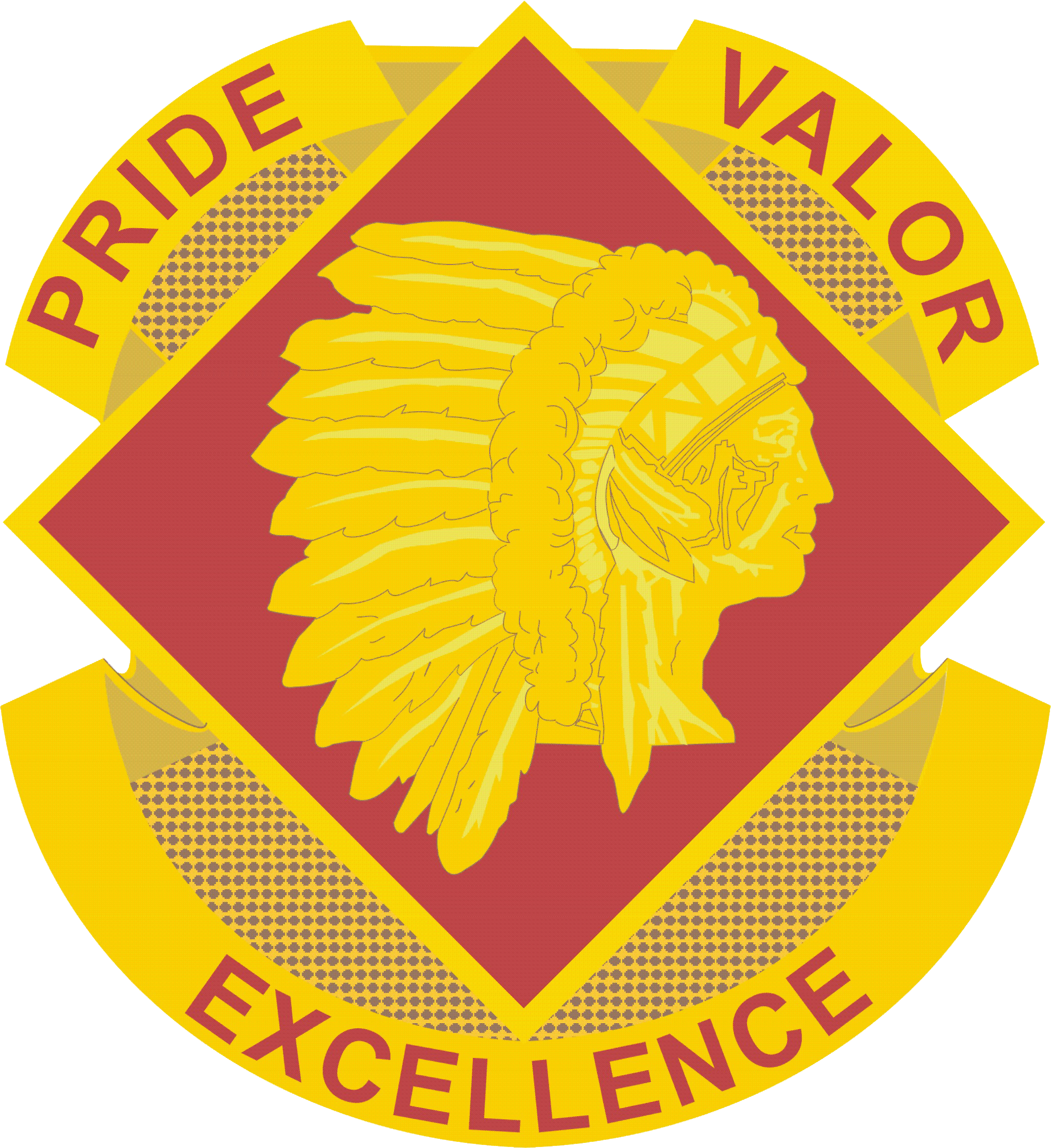
- Distinctive unit insignia

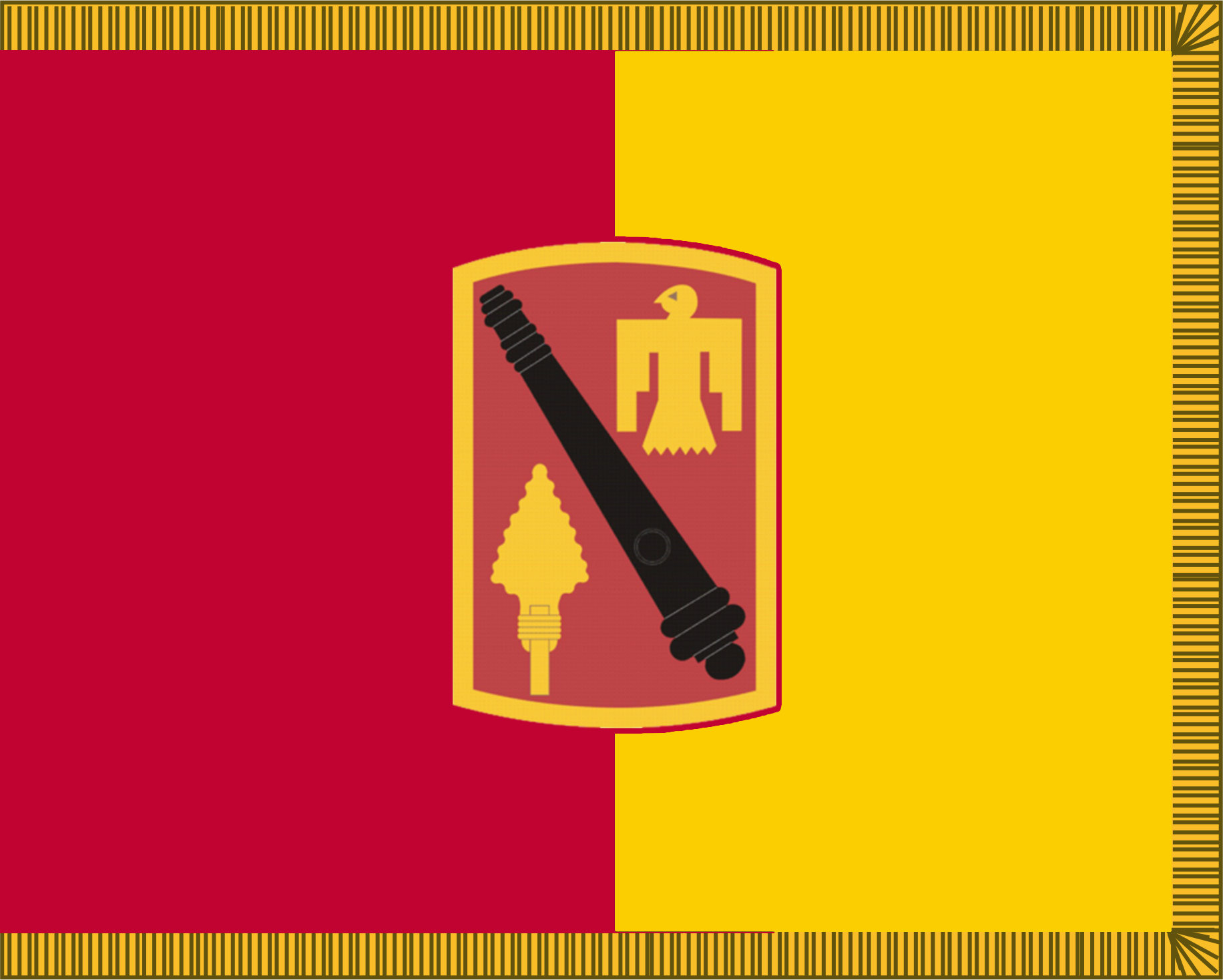
- 45th Field Artillery Brigade Flag

The 45th Fires Brigade is a modular field artillery brigade of the United States Army headquartered in Mustang, Oklahoma. It is a part of the Oklahoma Army National Guard.

Formed from elements of the disbanded 45th Infantry Division which saw action during World War II and the Korean War, along with the 45th Infantry Brigade Combat Team and 90th Troop Command, the 45th Artillery Group was activated in 1968. It was later redesignated the 45th Field Artillery Group (1972) and then the 45th Field Artillery Brigade (1978). The unit was again redesignated 45th Fires Brigade in 2008 with the implementation of Army Transformation.

In common with the 45th IBCT and the 90th Troop Command, the brigade retained the Shoulder Sleeve Insignia of the 45th Infantry Division, only designing and approving its own SSI in 1997.

== Current Structure ==
The 45th Field Artillery Brigade is a subordinate unit of the Oklahoma Army National Guard, headquartered in Mustang, Oklahoma. The brigade organically commands two battalions, a target acquisition battery, and a signal company. These units are:

- 45th Field Artillery Brigade, in Mustang, Oklahoma
  - Headquarters Battery, in Mustang, Oklahoma
  - 1st Battalion, 158th Field Artillery Regiment (M142 HIMARS), at Fort Sill, Oklahoma
  - 271st Brigade Support Battalion, in Altus, Oklahoma
  - 205th Signal Company, in Mustang, Oklahoma
  - Battery B (Target Acquisition), 171st Field Artillery Regiment, in Weatherford, Oklahoma

Two additional field artillery battalions of the brigade are under administrative control of other formations:

- 110th Maneuver Enhancement Brigade (Missouri Army National Guard)
  - 1st Battalion, 129th Field Artillery Regiment (M777A2), in Maryville, Missouri
- 136th Maneuver Enhancement Brigade (Texas Army National Guard)
  - 4th Battalion, 133rd Field Artillery Regiment (M142 HIMARS), in San Marcos, Texas

== History ==
The history of the 45th Fires Brigade can be traced back to the days following World War I when LTC William S. Key, I was appointed Captain of Field Artillery in the Oklahoma Army National Guard. He was directed to organize a light artillery battery at Wewoka, Oklahoma. By 1920, Oklahoma had three regiments of artillery, of which, the 158th is the core of today's fires brigade.

=== 45th Infantry Division ===
On 19 October 1920, the Oklahoma State militia was organized as the 45th Infantry Division of the Oklahoma Army National Guard and organized with troops from Arizona, Colorado, New Mexico, and Oklahoma. The division was organized and federally recognized as a US Army unit on 3 August 1923 in Oklahoma City, Oklahoma. Prior to World War II, the division was called on many times to maintain order in times of disaster and to keep peace during periods of political unrest. Oklahoma Governor John C. Walton used division troops to prevent the State Legislature from meeting when they were preparing to impeach him in 1923. Governor William H. Murray called out the guard several times during the depression to close banks, distribute food and once to force the State of Texas to keep open a free bridge over the Red River which Texas intended to collect tolls for, even after federal courts ordered the bridge not be opened.

The division would go on to see combat in World War II as one of four national guard divisions active during the war. The division was active for over five years, participating in eight campaigns, four amphibious assaults, for a total of 511 days of combat. Following World War II the division became an all-Oklahoma organization. In 1950, the division was also called into service during the Korean War, participating in four campaigns and fighting for 429 days.

=== Cold War years ===
In 1968, the division was disbanded and the 45th Artillery Group, later 45th Field Artillery Group (1972) was one of the units formed in its place.

During the 1970s and 1980s, the 45th Field Artillery Brigade, as it became in 1978, conducted its own training for active service in the event of mobilization. The specific mobilization assignment of the brigade during those years is not clear.

=== Desert Storm ===
The 158th was a late deploying unit for Operation Desert Shield in 1991. By the time the 1-158th Field Artillery came together in the Saudi desert, the ground offensive of Desert Storm was only days away. The l-158th was assigned to the 75th Field Artillery Brigade, and their purpose was to fire preparatory fires on Iraqi artillery positions and other targets the following day, 21 February. This was also the beginning of the battalion constantly being on the move. This battalion would support seven different higher headquarters throughout the unit's time in-theater: 3d Armored Division; VII Corps Artillery, 210th Field Artillery Brigade in the 2d Armored Cavalry Regiment, the 1st Infantry Division, and assigned in support of the 1st Cavalry Division. As part of VII Corps' repositioning of its units to the west in preparation for the "Hail Mary" tactic to defeat the Iraqi forces, A Battery, sent its advance party on a 95-mile desert march not knowing that within three days of that move, the battery would be the first Army National Guard unit to fire on the enemy.

On 16 February, Battery A engaged six enemy targets with 98 rockets. The next day the battery delivered 71 rockets on four targets and on 20 February, it launched 48 rockets against four more targets. The remainder of the 1-158th FA was unloading its launchers at Dammam Port, Saudi Arabia. Battery B, and C Battery, soon began hitting enemy targets in preparation for the ground offensive. In total the 1-158 Field Artillery Oklahoma Army National Guard fired 903 rockets and traveled hundreds of kilometers in support of VII Corps operations.

== Lineage and honors ==
=== Lineage ===
- Organized and Federally recognized 5 August 1920 in the Oklahoma National Guard at Enid as Battery A, 2d Field Artillery
- Redesignated 10 October 1921 as Battery A, 189th Field Artillery, an element of the 45th Division
- Redesignated 1 May 1939 as Battery F, 189th Field Artillery
- Inducted into Federal service 16 September 1940 at Enid
- Reorganized and redesignated 11 February 1942 as Battery C, 202d Field Artillery, and relieved from assignment to the 45th Division

(45th Division redesignated 23 February 1942 as the 45th Infantry Division)

- Reorganized and redesignated 1 March 1943 as Battery C, 202d Field Artillery Battalion
- Inactivated 24 November 1945 at Camp Bowie, Texas
- Reorganized and Federally recognized 13 November 1946 in the Oklahoma National Guard at Enid as Battery A, 189th Field Artillery Battalion, an element of the 45th Infantry Division
- Ordered into active Federal service 1 September 1950 at Enid

(Battery A, 189th Field Artillery Battalion [NGUS], organized and Federally recognized 11 December 1952 at Enid)

- Released from active Federal service 30 April 1954 and reverted to state control; concurrently consolidated with Headquarters Battery, 189th Field Artillery Battalion (see ANNEX 1), and consolidated unit designated as Battery A, 189th Field Artillery Battalion; Federal recognition concurrently withdrawn from Battery A, 189th Field Artillery Battalion (NGUS)
- Reorganized and redesignated 1 May 1959 as Headquarters Battery, 2d Battalion, 189th Artillery, an element of the 45th Infantry Division
- Reorganized and redesignated 1 April 1963 as Headquarters and Service Battery, 1st Battalion, 189th Artillery, an element of the 45th Infantry Division
- Consolidated 1 February 1968 with Battery C, 1st Battalion, 158th Artillery (organized and Federally recognized 1 November 1965 at Enid), and consolidated unit reorganized and redesignated as Headquarters Battery, 1st Battalion, 189th Artillery, and relieved from assignment to the 45th Infantry Division
- Redesignated 1 May 1972 as Headquarters Battery, 1st Battalion, 189th Field Artillery
- Consolidated 1 October 1996 with Headquarters and Headquarters Battery, 45th Field Artillery Brigade (see ANNEX 2), and consolidated unit designated as Headquarters and Headquarters Battery, 45th Field Artillery Brigade
- Ordered into active Federal service 15 March 2003 at Enid; released from active Federal service 27 May 2003 and reverted to state control
- Ordered into active Federal service 19 August 2008 at Enid
- Reorganized and redesignated 1 September 2008 as Headquarters and Headquarters Battery, 45th Fires Brigade
- Released from active Federal service 22 September 2009 and reverted to state control
- Location changed 1 July 2010 to Mustang

ANNEX 1

- Organized and Federally recognized 17 November 1921 in the Oklahoma National Guard at Enid as Headquarters Battery and Combat Train, 1st Battalion, 189th Field Artillery, an element of the 45th Division
- Reorganized and redesignated 1 November 1939 as Headquarters Battery, 189th Field Artillery
- Inducted into Federal service 16 September 1940 at Enid
- Redesignated 11 February 1942 as Headquarters Battery, 202d Field Artillery, and relieved from assignment to the 45th Division

(45th Division redesignated 23 February 1942 as the 45th Infantry Division)

- Reorganized and redesignated 1 March 1943 as Headquarters Battery, 202d Field Artillery Group
- Inactivated 28 November 1945 at Camp Kilmer, New Jersey
- Reorganized and Federally recognized 17 September 1946 in the Oklahoma National Guard at Enid as Headquarters Battery, 189th Field Artillery Battalion, an element of the 45th Infantry Division
- Ordered into active Federal service 1 September 1950 at Enid; released from active Federal service 30 April 1954 and reverted to state control

ANNEX 2

- Organized and Federally recognized 10 October 1921 in the Oklahoma National Guard at Enid as the Band Section, Service Battery, 2d Field Artillery
- Redesignated 14 October 1921 as the Band Section, Service Battery, 189th Field Artillery, an element of the 45th Division
- Reorganized and redesignated 1 July 1940 as the Band, 189th Field Artillery
- Inducted into Federal service 16 September 1940 at Enid
- Redesignated 11 February 1942 as the Band, 202d Field Artillery, and relieved from assignment to the 45th Division

(45th Division redesignated 23 February 1942 as the 45th Infantry Division)

- Reorganized and redesignated 1 February 1944 as the 203d Army Band
- Reorganized and redesignated 7 June 1944 as the 203d Army Ground Forces Band
- Inactivated 11 June 1946 in Italy
- Reorganized and Federally recognized 4 March 1947 in the Oklahoma National Guard at Enid as Company K, 179th Infantry, an element of the 45th Infantry Division
- Ordered into active Federal service 1 September 1950 at Enid

(Company K, 179th Infantry [NGUS], organized and Federally recognized 21 October 1952 at Enid)

- Released from active Federal service 30 April 1954 and reverted to state control; Federal recognition concurrently withdrawn from Company K, 179th Infantry (NGUS)
- Consolidated 1 May 1959 with Headquarters and Headquarters Battery, 45th Division Artillery (see ANNEX 3), and consolidated unit reorganized and redesignated as Headquarters and Headquarters Battery, 45th Infantry Division Artillery
- Reorganized and redesignated 1 February 1968 as Headquarters and Headquarters Battery, 45th Artillery Group, and relieved from assignment to the 45th Infantry Division
- Redesignated 1 May 1972 as Headquarters and Headquarters Battery, 45th Field Artillery Group
- Redesignated 1 September 1978 as Headquarters and Headquarters Battery, 45th Field Artillery Brigade

ANNEX 3

- Organized and Federally recognized 17 September 1952 in the Oklahoma Army National Guard at Enid as Headquarters and Headquarters Battery, 45th Division Artillery (NGUS)
- Reorganized and redesignated 30 April 1954 as Headquarters and Headquarters Battery, 45th Division Artillery

HOME STATION: Mustang

=== Campaign participation credit ===
- World War II: Normandy; Northern France; Rhineland; Ardennes-Alsace; Central Europe
- Korean War: Second Korean Winter; Korea, Summer-Fall 1952; Third Korean Winter; Korea, Summer 1953
- War on Terrorism: Campaigns to be determined

=== Decorations ===
- Army Superior Unit Award, Streamer embroidered 2005
- Republic of Korea Presidential Unit Citation, Streamer embroidered KOREA 1951-1953

== Heraldry ==
=== Shoulder Sleeve Insignia ===
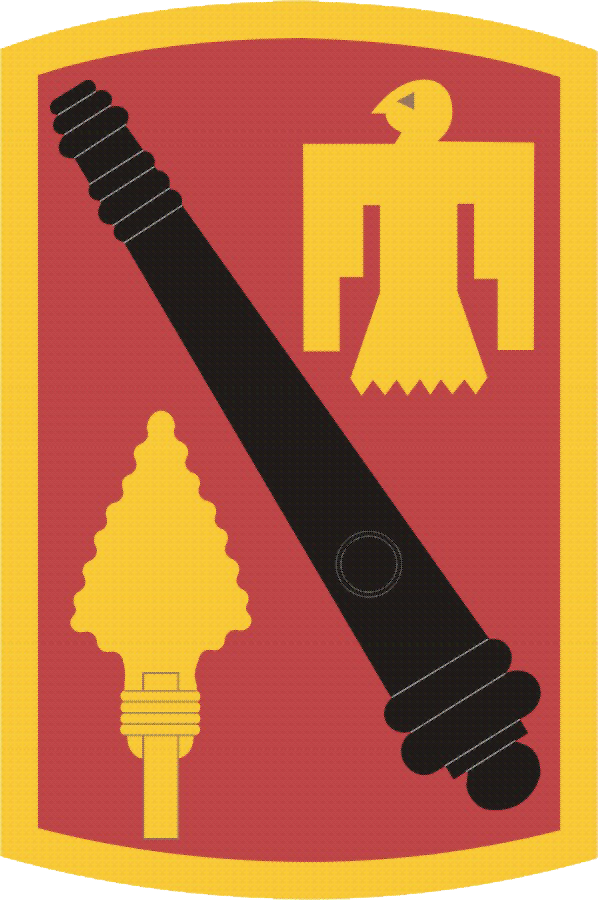

=== Distinctive unit insignia ===
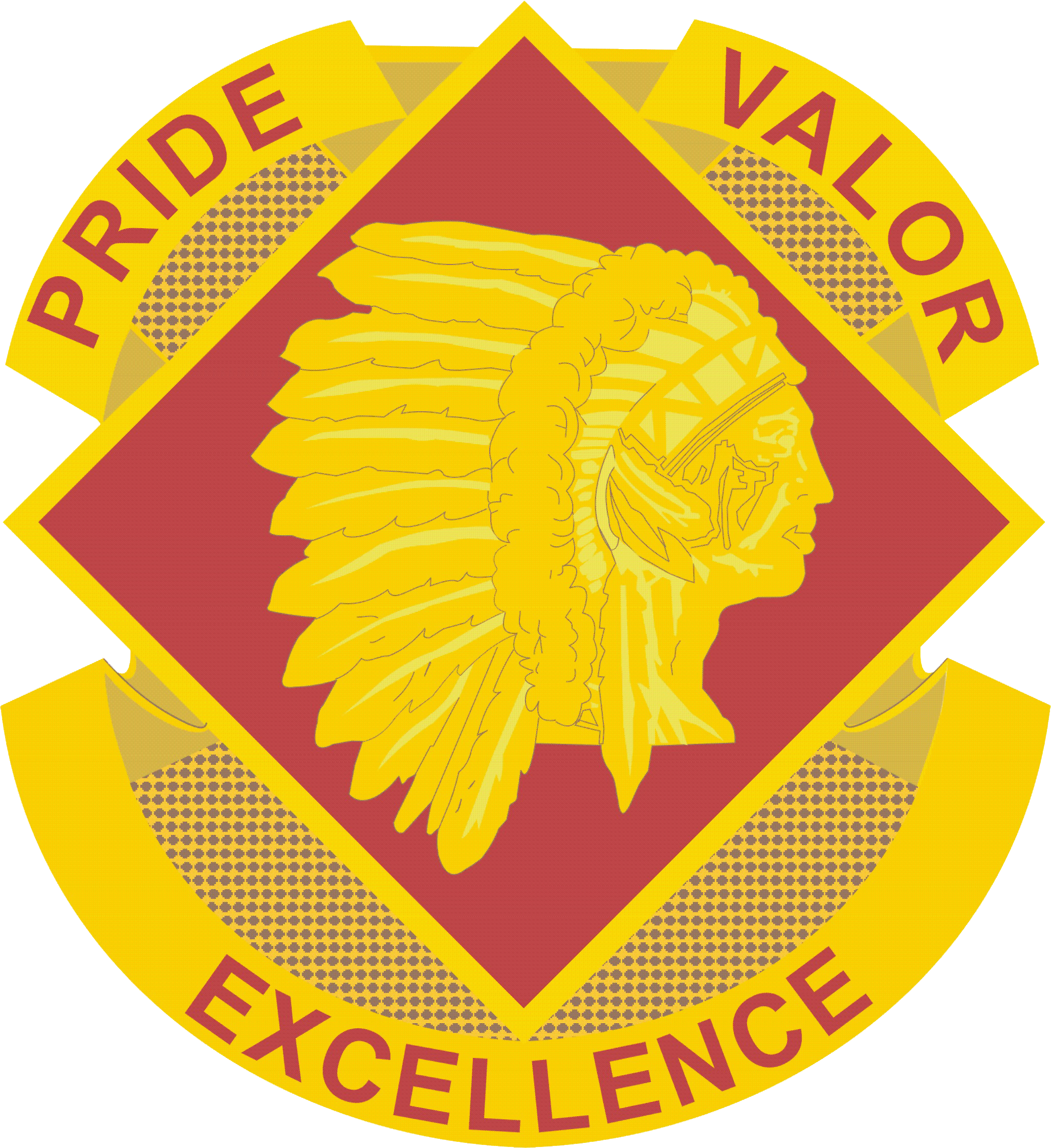
