= 179th Infantry Regiment (United States) =

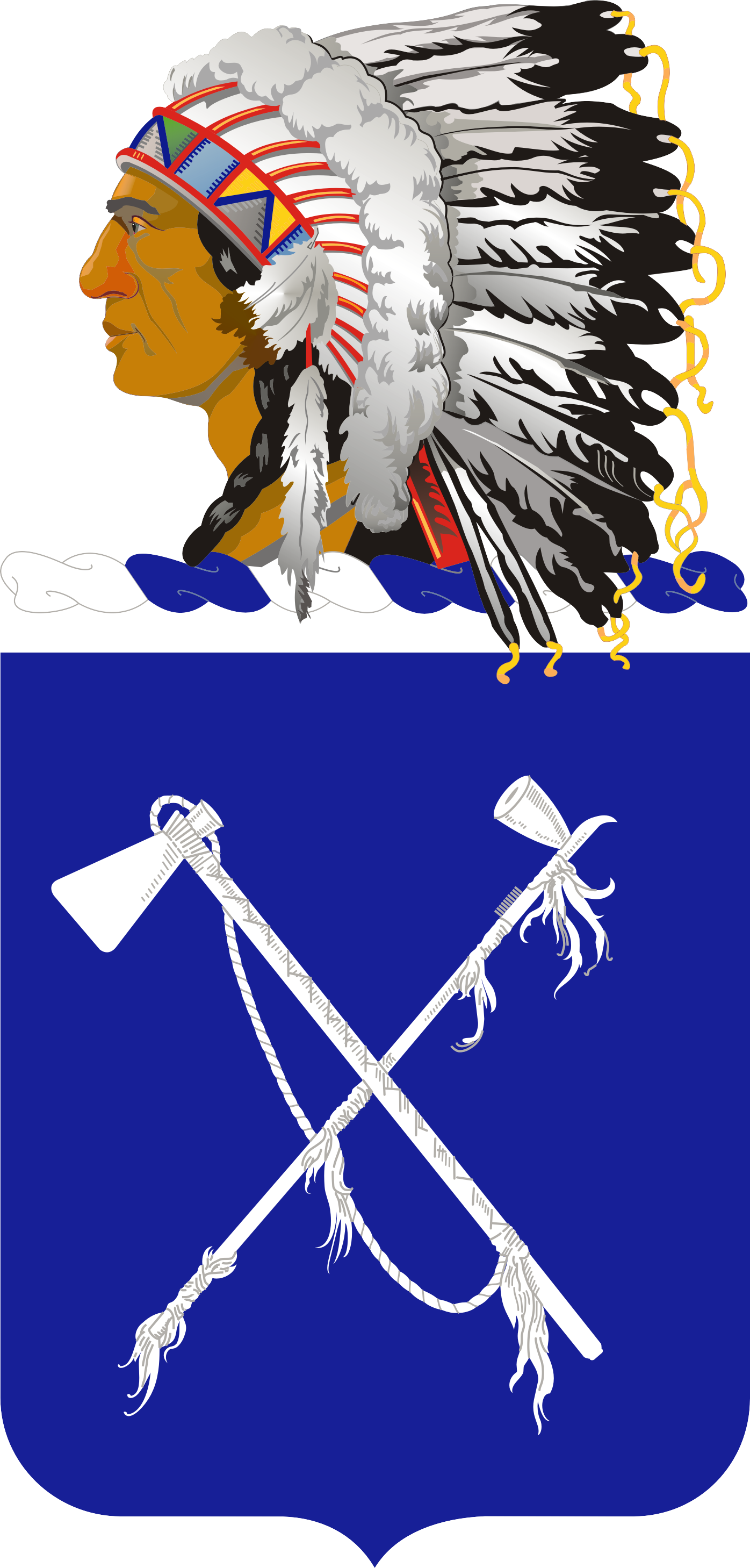
- Coat of arms
- Active: 1890-present
- Country: United States
- Branch: United States Army
- Type: Infantry
- Role: Light infantry
- Size: Battalion
- Garrison/HQ: Stillwater, Oklahoma
- Nickname: Tomahawks (special designation)
- Motto: "In Omina Paratus" (In All Things Prepared)
- Colors: Blue and silver (white)

Commanders
- Notable commanders: Forrest Caraway; William Orlando Darby; Frederick R. Zierath; Jefferson J. Irvin; Michael S. Davison (1st Battalion)

Insignia
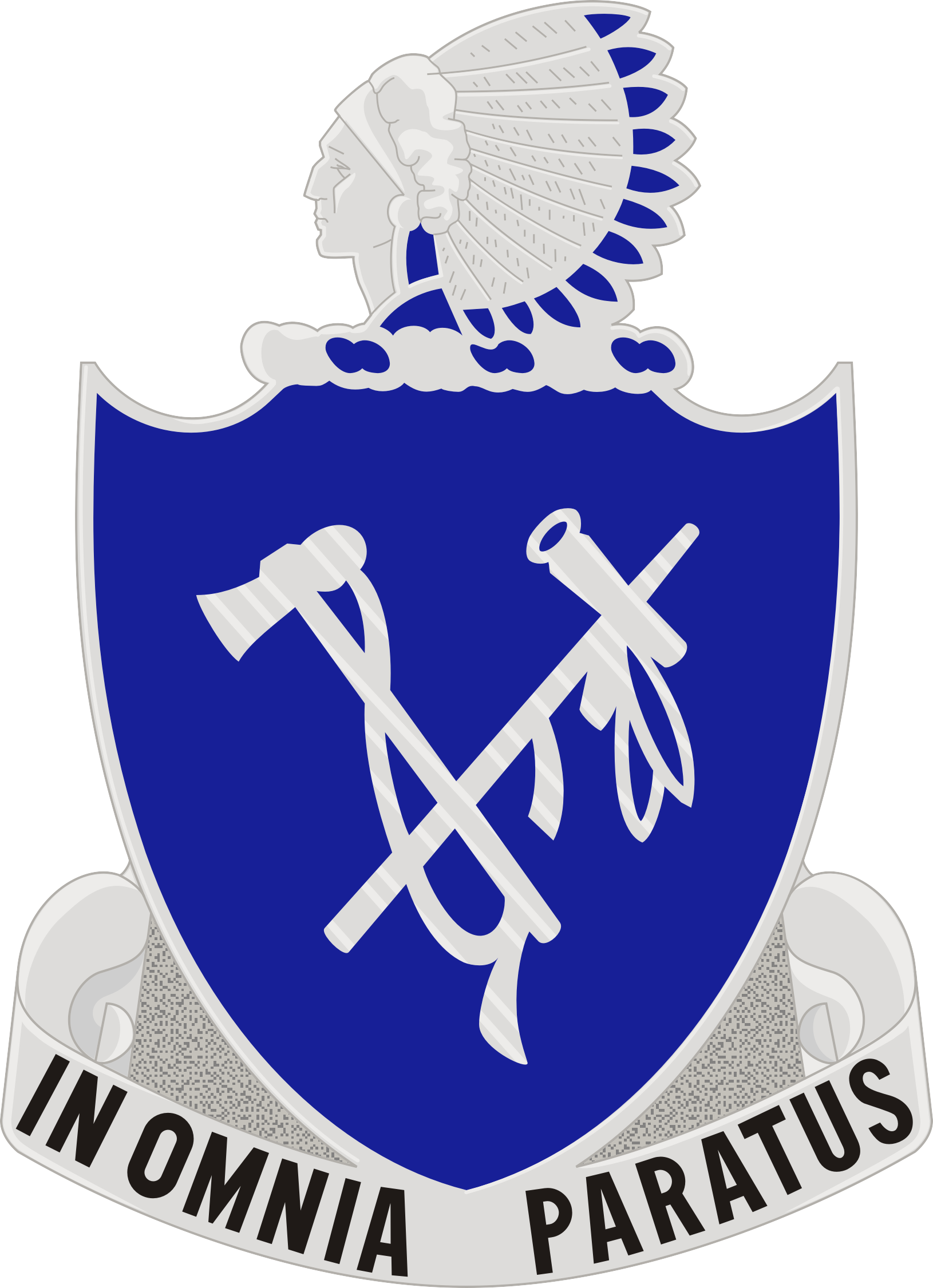
- Distinctive unit insignia.

The 179th Infantry Regiment ("Tomahawks") is an infantry regiment of the United States Army's National Guard.

Currently, the 1st Battalion is the only active battalion in the regiment and is organized as a combined arms battalion under the brigade unit of action table of organization and equipment. The battalion is an organic element of the 45th Infantry Brigade Combat Team of the Oklahoma Army National Guard.

== Lineage ==
The unit that would become the 179th Infantry was first constituted on 2 May 1890 in the Oklahoma Volunteer Militia as the 1st Infantry Regiment. It was organized on 21 December 1895 from new and existing militia companies, with the regimental headquarters at Guthrie, Oklahoma. The Oklahoma Volunteer Militia was concurrently redesignated as the Oklahoma National Guard.

=== Spanish-American War ===
Volunteers and militiamen from the Arizona and New Mexico territories were consolidated to form the 1st Regiment, Territorial Volunteer Infantry, United States Volunteers, and were mustered into federal service from 4–23 July 1898. The regiment was mustered out of federal service from 11–15 February 1899 at Albany, Georgia. The former 1st Infantry Regiment, Oklahoma National Guard, was reorganized in 1899 as the 1st Regiment of Infantry, with headquarters at Guthrie.

=== Mexican border and World War I ===
The 1st Infantry Regiment was mustered into federal service on 27 June 1916 for service during the Pancho Villa Expedition, and mustered out of federal service on 1 March 1917 at Fort Sill, Oklahoma. It was called into federal service on 31 March 1917, and drafted into federal service on 5 August 1917. The regiment was consolidated on 15 October 1917 with the 7th Infantry, Texas National Guard, and the consolidated unit was redesignated as the 142nd Infantry, an element of the 36th Division.

=== Interwar period ===
The 142nd Infantry arrived at the port of New York on 31 May 1919 on the cruiser USS Pueblo and was demobilized on 17 June 1919 at Camp Bowie, Texas. Central Oklahoma companies formerly part of the 142nd Infantry were reorganized by consolidation in 1920–21 with the 2nd Infantry, Oklahoma National Guard (organized 31 August 1918; headquarters concurrently organized and federally recognized at Oklahoma City). The 142nd Infantry became an all-Texas unit in the 36th Division, and the Oklahoma infantry regiment was assigned to the new 45th Infantry Division and redesignated as the 179th Infantry on 14 October 1921.

The regimental headquarters was successively relocated as follows: to Ardmore, Oklahoma, 5 May 1925; Pawnee, Oklahoma, 23 May 1930; Oklahoma City, 1 September 1940. The entire regiment, or elements thereof, was called up to perform the following state duties: 1st Battalion performed martial law during the Tulsa race massacre, 1–12 June 1921; an ad-hoc battalion of four companies performed riot control during a railroad strike at Shawnee, Oklahoma, 9–25 August 1922; elements performed martial law duties throughout Oklahoma in connection with heavy floods, 13 September–8 October 1923; 1st Battalion performed oil well disaster relief at Oklahoma City, 30 October–1 November 1930. The regiment conducted annual summer training most years at Fort Sill, 1921–39. It was inducted into active federal service at home stations on 16 September 1940 and moved to Fort Sill, where it arrived 26 September 1940. It was subsequently transferred on 28 February 1941 to Camp Barkeley, Texas.

=== World War II ===
The 179th Regimental Combat Team was part of the 45th Infantry Division, and fought on the Italian front and on the Western Front.

=== Cold War to present ===
- Inactivated 17–29 November 1945 at Camp Bowie, Texas
- Reorganized 10 September 1946 in the Oklahoma National Guard as the 179th Infantry, with headquarters federally recognized at Edmond
- Ordered into active federal service 1 September 1950 at Edmond
- Fought in the Korean War (as part of the 45th Infantry Division)
- (179th Infantry [NGUS] organized and federally recognized 15 September 1952 with headquarters at Edmond)
- Released from active federal service 20 April 1954 and reverted to state control; federal recognition concurrently withdrawn from the 179th Infantry (NGUS)
- Reorganized (less 2d Battalion) 1 May 1959 as the 179th Infantry, a parent regiment under the Combat Arms Regimental System, to consist of the 1st and 2d Battle Groups, elements of the 45th Infantry Division (2d Battalion concurrently reorganized as the 2d Reconnaissance Squadron, 245th Armor—hereafter separate lineage)
- Reorganized 1 April 1963 to consist of the 1st and 2d Battalions, elements of the 45th Infantry Division
- Reorganized 1 February 1968 to consist of the 1st Battalion, and relieved from assignment to the 45th Infantry Division
- (Location of headquarters changed 1 April 1979 to Stillwater)
- Withdrawn 1 May 1989 from the Combat Arms Regimental System and reorganized under the United States Army Regimental System
- Ordered into active federal service 30 November 2002 at home stations; released from active federal service 26 August 2003 and reverted to state control
- Redesignated 1 October 2005 as the 179th Infantry Regiment
- Ordered into active federal service 20 October 2007 at home stations; released from active federal service 22 November 2008 and reverted to state control
- Assigned 1 September 2008 to the 45th Infantry Brigade Combat Team
- Ordered into active federal service 27 March 2011 at home stations

== Current units ==
1st Battalion is a subordinate unit of the 45th Infantry Brigade Combat Team, headquartered in Edmond, Oklahoma. The battalion commands six companies. These units are:

- Headquarters and Headquarters Company, 1st Battalion, 179th Infantry Regiment (Edmond, Oklahoma)
- Company A, 1st Battalion, 179th Infantry Regiment (rifle company) (El Reno, Oklahoma)
- Company B, 1st Battalion, 179th Infantry Regiment (rifle company) (Enid, Oklahoma)
- Company C, 1st Battalion, 179th Infantry Regiment (rifle company) (Edmond, Oklahoma)
- Company D, 1st Battalion, 179th Infantry Regiment (heavy weapons company) (Ponca City, Oklahoma)
- Company H, 700th Support Battalion (forward support company) (Stillwater, Oklahoma)

== Campaign streamers ==
World War I

- Meuse-Argonne

World War II

- Sicily (with Arrowhead)
- Naples-Foggia (with Arrowhead)
- Anzio
- Rome-Arno
- Southern France (with Arrowhead)
- Rhineland
- Ardennes-Alsace
- Central Europe

Korean War

- Second Korean winter
- Korea, summer-fall 1952
- Third Korean winter
- Korea, Summer 1953

Global War on Terrorism

Operation Iraqi Freedom

- Iraq Surge 2008
- Operation Enduring Freedom
- Consolidation III (1 December 2009 – 30 June 2011)
- Transition I (1 July 2011 - first half of 2012)

== Battlefield or campaign honors and awards ==
=== Unit decorations ===
- French Croix de Guerre with Palm awarded to 45th Infantry Division for action from 1–31 January 1944 at Acquafondata
- Army Meritorious Unit Commendation, Iraq 2008

Additionally, the following units are entitled to the Meritorious Unit Citation

- A Company, 1st Battalion, 179th Infantry Regiment
- B Company, 1st Battalion, 179th Infantry Regiment
- C Company, 1st Battalion, 179th Infantry Regiment

Per DAGO 208-11 (Corrected Copy) (2011)

- *B Company, 1st Battalion, 179th Infantry Regiment

Per DAGO 2009-23 (2009)

==== Streamers ====
- Meritorious Unit Commendation (Army), Streamer embroidered IRAQ 2008
