= 90th Troop Command =

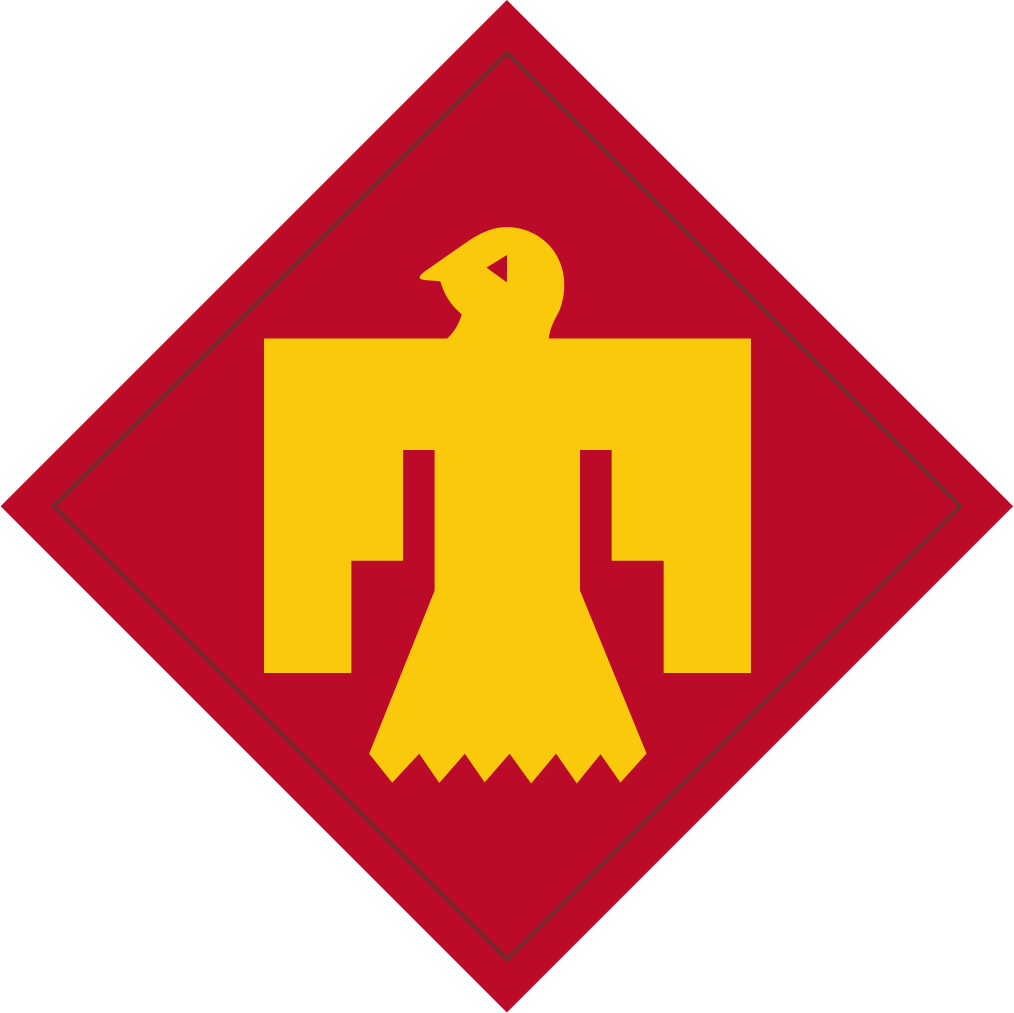
- Shoulder sleeve insignia 90th Troop Command shares the same SSI as the 45th Infantry Brigade
- Active: 1968 – present
- Country: United States of America
- Branch: Army National Guard
- Type: Troop Command
- Role: Transportation, Engineering, WMD response, unit training
- Size: Brigade
- Part of: Oklahoma Army National Guard
- Garrison/HQ: Oklahoma City, Oklahoma

The 90th Troop Command is a brigade equivalent organization of the United States Army headquartered in Oklahoma City, Oklahoma. It is a part of the Oklahoma Army National Guard.

A troop command is a command and control headquarters and planning staff for smaller units of the National Guard, within a state that are not organized under a division or brigade headquarters. In the case of states like Oklahoma that once had division organizations, the intent was also to retain some of the higher planning and coordination capabilities that the division once provided. Over time, many of the elements that once fell under 90th Troop Command have been disbanded to include the second battalions of the 179th, 180th, and 279th Infantry Regiments.

== History ==
Formed from elements of the disbanded 45th Infantry Division which saw action during World War II and the Korean War, along with the 45th Field Artillery Group (today's 45th Fires Brigade) and 45th Infantry Brigade, 90th Troop Command was activated in 1968.

While there is no connection by lineage, 90th Troop Command's designation hearkens back to the days of the 45th Infantry Division's Square organization. 90th Infantry Brigade was an Oklahoma brigade in the, then four-state division, composed of the 180th and 179th Infantry Regiments. The Square organization was dropped in favor of the Triangular organization, just prior to World War II, which eliminated the brigade echelons and reduced a division's maneuver regiments from four to three.

== Organization ==
The 90th Troop Command is a subordinate unit of the Oklahoma Army National Guard, headquartered in Oklahoma City, OK. The brigade commands two battalions, themselves made up of, largely of independently numbered companies, plus Oklahoma's weapons of mass destruction response team, a Public Affairs Detachment, and the Oklahoma Army Guard's band. These units are:
90th Troop Command

- 120th Engineer Battalion
  - A Company 120th Engineers (Forward Support Company)
  - 1220th Engineer Company (Horizontal Construction)
  - 1120th Engineer Company (Asphalt)
  - 2120th Engineer Company (Vertical Construction)
  - 3120th Engineer Company (Engineer Support)
  - 120th Area Support Medical Company
- 345th Combat Sustainment Support Battalion

345th Headquarters and Headquarters Company

  - 1245th Transportation Company
  - 1345th Transportation Company
  - A Company 777th Aviation Support Battalion
  - 745th Military Police Detachment
- 63rd Civil Support Team (WMD)
- 145th Army Band
- 145th Mobile Public Affairs Detachment
- Oklahoma Medical Detachment

== Missions ==
The 90th Troop Command has federal missions of pre-mobilization to command, control, and supervise Oklahoma Army National Guard units attached to the troop command so as to provide trained and equipped units capable of immediate expansion to war strength and available for service in time of war or national emergency or when appropriate to augment the active army.

Its post-mobilization federal missions are to provide support to alerted units, assistance to military family members beyond the support capability of military facilities, and preparedness to remain in federal status to assist the CONUSA with military support to civil defense, land defense, and other war-related operations.

The 90th Troop Command has state missions of pre-mobilization to command, control, and supervise assigned ARNG units employed in support of civil authorities in the protection of life and property and the preservation of peace, order, and public safety under competent orders of state authorities. Its post-mobilization state mission include assisting in the organization and training of a militia if required, performing command and control functions in support of civil authorities as directed, and preparing to reconstitute the ARANG/ANG when units are released from federal service.
