= Woody Big Bow =

Kiowa painter, contractor and builder

- Tse Ko Yate
- Born: Woodrow Wilson Big Bow; January 29, 1915; Carnegie, Oklahoma, US
- Died: July 10, 1988 (aged 73); Bethany, Oklahoma, US
- Citizenship: Kiowa, American

Woodrow Wilson "Woody" Big Bow (January 29, 1915 – July 10, 1988), was a Kiowa painter, contractor and builder. He painted in the flat style, often depicting Kiowa people and Indigenous life as well as natural scenery. Big Bow exhibited his artwork across the United States and Europe and has worked in the public collections of several institutions including the Gilcrease Museum, the Philbrook Museum of Art, the Wichita Art Museum, and the Smithsonian National Museum of the American Indian.

Big Bow was born in Carnegie, Oklahoma, and was the great-grandson of Kiowa Chief Big Bow (Zepko-Ete). He was raised on his family's land in the Kiowa-Comanche-Apache Reservation. He graduated from the University of Oklahoma in 1939, where he studied under Swedish artist Oscar Jacobson.

Big Bow worked for a time as a set painter for Western films. He also created murals for the interior of the RCA Building in New York City and the Southwest Museum of the American Indian in Los Angeles.

Insignia for the 45th Infantry, designed by Woody Big Bow

In 1939, his design submission was selected as the official shoulder sleeve insignia of the U.S. 45th Infantry Division, headquartered in Oklahoma City. Big Bow's artwork depicts a yellow Thunderbird on a red diamond shape.

Big Bow died in 1988 in Bethany, Oklahoma. He is buried in the Fort Cobb Cemetery.
