= Fort Tuthill =

Recreation facility in Coconino County, Arizona

Coordinates: 35°08′30″N 111°41′40″W

Fort Tuthill is a former National Guard training facility and a county park situated in Coconino County, Arizona. It has an estimated elevation of 6,995 feet (2,132 m) above sea level. The fort is listed on the National Register of Historic Places.

== History ==
Fort Tuthill was built in 1930 as a training facility for National Guardsmen. During the summers, the fort would host up to 3,000 people from around the southwest. The fort closed around 1948.

Fort Tuthill is now a county park and the site of a fairgrounds. Luke Air Force Base operates a military recreation area at Fort Tuthill. The Fort Tuthill military history museum is also located on the site. The site of the fort was renovated in 2017 to restore its historic nature.
