= 169th Field Artillery Brigade =

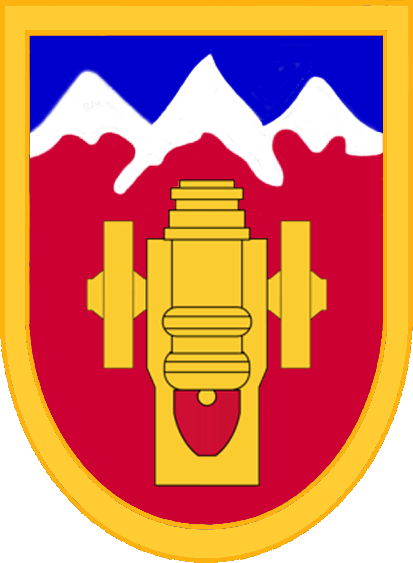
- 169th Field Artillery Brigade shoulder sleeve insignia
- Active: 1955–present (as group and brigade)
- Country: United States
- Branch: United States Army National Guard
- Type: Artillery
- Size: Brigade
- Part of: Colorado Army National Guard
- Headquarters: Buckley Space Force Base, Aurora, Colorado
- Nicknames: Liberators, Shamrock, Rocky Mountain Redlegs
- Engagements: Operation Iraqi Freedom; Operation Inherent Resolve
- Decorations: Croix de Guerre with Palm (headquarters and headquarters battery)

Commanders
- Current commander: COL William Diprofio

Insignia
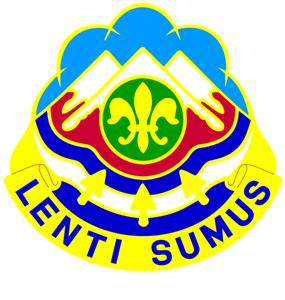
- Distinctive Unit Insignia

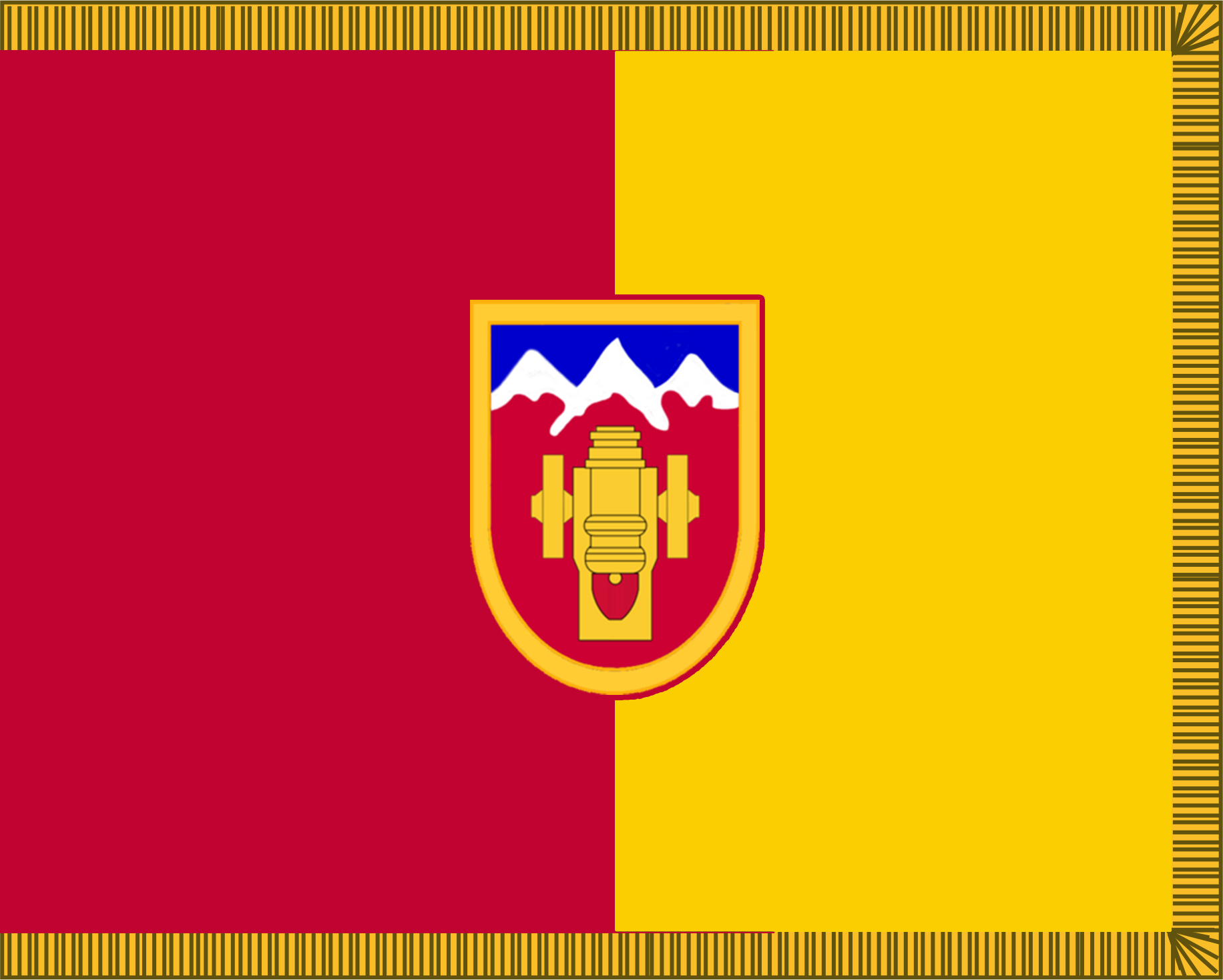
- 169th Field Artillery Brigade Flag

The 169th Field Artillery Brigade (formerly the 169th Fires Brigade) is an artillery brigade in the US Army National Guard. It is part of the Colorado Army National Guard.

== History ==
The brigade headquarters was organized on 19 June 1909 as Company M of the 1st Infantry, Colorado National Guard at Denver. The company was transferred to the 2nd Infantry on 19 November, retaining its letter, and on 15 August 1913 returned to the 1st Infantry as Company G. When the National Guard was called up for duty on the Mexican border in 1916, the company was mustered into Federal service on 19 June as Company B of the 1st Colorado Infantry Battalion. After the American entry into World War I, the unit was drafted into Federal service on 5 August 1917 and on 24 September became Company B of the 157th Infantry Regiment, part of the 40th Division. It was sent to France with the division but did not see combat as a unit, being used as a depot to provide replacements. The company returned to the United States after the end of the war and was demobilized at Fort D. A. Russell on 29 April 1919.

When the Colorado National Guard was reestablished postwar, the Denver unit became Headquarters Company of the 2nd Battalion, 157th Infantry and was reorganized and Federally recognized on 26 November 1923. The regiment was assigned to the 45th Division, and on 1 April 1928 the company was reorganized and redesignated as Company B of the regiment. Except for its antitank platoon, the company was reorganized and redesignated as the regimental headquarters company on 1 November 1939. Inducted into Federal service on 16 September 1940, it fought in World War II with the 45th. After the end of the war, the company was inactivated at Camp Bowie on 3 December 1945.

After the end of the war, the 157th was removed from the 45th on 10 May 1946. The Colorado Army National Guard was revived and on 8 January 1947 the regimental headquarters company was reorganized and Federally recognized. Initially at Buckley Field, it was relocated to Denver on 3 September of that year.

Due to a reduction of National Guard regimental combat teams, the Colorado National Guard combat units converted to artillery on 1 August 1955, with the regimental headquarters company of the 157th becoming the headquarters and headquarters battery of the 169th Field Artillery Group. The 1st Battalion of the 157th became the 144th Field Artillery Battalion (155mm Howitzer, Towed), the HHC of the 2nd Battalion, and Companies E, K and L became HHB, Service Battery, and Batteries A and B of the 142nd Field Artillery Battalion (155mm Gun, Towed), respectively. Companies F and H became Batteries A and B, respectively, of the 137th Field Artillery Battalion (Observation), while the HHC of the 3rd Battalion, Company M, the Medical Company, and the Tank Company became Service Battery, HHB, and Batteries C and B of the 183rd Field Artillery Battalion (240mm Howitzer, Towed). Company I and Service Company became Service Battery and Battery B of the 169th Field Artillery Battalion (8-inch Howitzer, Self-Propelled), respectively, and the Heavy Mortar Company became Battery A of the 188th Antiaircraft Artillery Battalion (Automatic Weapons) (Self-Propelled). In addition to the 157th, the 199th Engineer Battalion and 193rd Tank Battalion also converted to artillery. The 169th consisted of six field artillery battalions (the 137th, 142nd, 144th, 168th (155mm Gun, Self-Propelled), 169th, and 183rd) and the 188th Antiaircraft Artillery Battalion, under the command of former 157th Regimental Combat Team commander Colonel Milton Ehrlich. Group executive officer Lieutenant Colonel Felix L. Sparks succeeded Ehrlich in July 1959 when the latter advanced to command of the Colorado Army National Guard.

The group was redesignated as the 169th Artillery Group on 1 October 1959. The 110-strong group headquarters was ordered into active Federal service on 1 October 1961 as part of the American reaction to the Berlin Crisis of 1961, and sent to Fort Sill. At Fort Sill, the 169th became one of the two artillery group headquarters under the 34th Artillery Brigade in order to provide control for the increased number of artillery battalions at the post. The group headquarters was released from duty in August 1962 after the end of the crisis. The group returned to its original artillery designation on 1 March 1972 and its headquarters simultaneously relocated to Aurora. The group was redesignated as the 169th Field Artillery Brigade on 1 May 1978. The brigade headquarters was activated in response to Hurricane Katrina in 2005. The 101-strong brigade headquarters was mobilized in March 2006 for service in Iraq and returned in July 2007. It was stationed at Camp Speicher and did not suffer casualties during the deployment. The brigade was officially redesignated as the 169th Fires Brigade on 1 September 2008, returning to its previous designation on 16 October 2014.

The brigade was deployed for Operation Inherent Resolve between 13 December 2016 and 11 September 2017, controlling field artillery battalions of Central Command. The 1st Battalion, 109th Field Artillery Regiment of the Pennsylvania Army National Guard was placed under the operational control of the brigade headquarters in May 2018, remaining under the 55th Maneuver Enhancement Brigade for administrative purposes.

== Organization ==
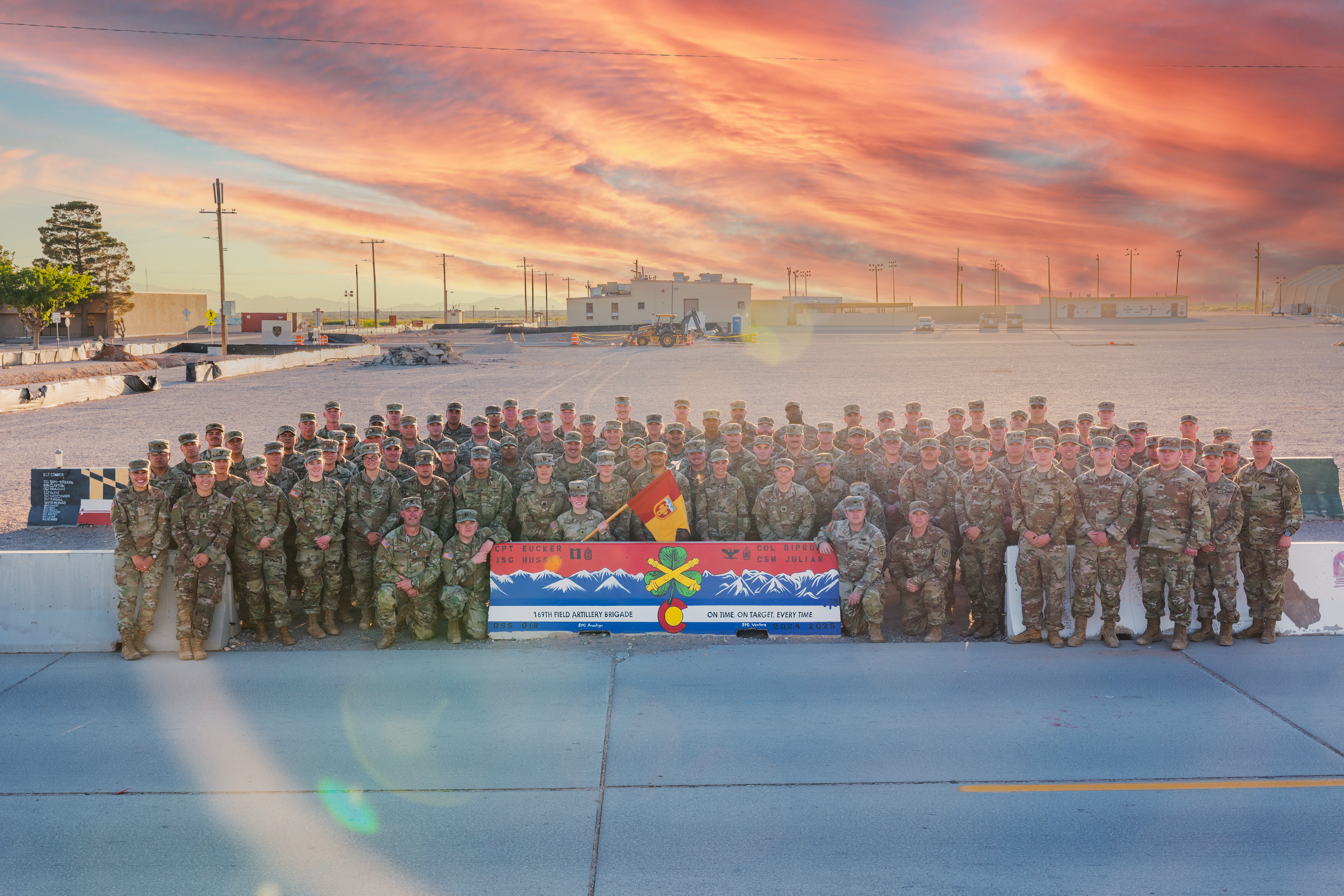
Headquarters Battery, 169th Field Artillery Brigade

As of January 2026 the 169th Field Artillery Brigade consists of the following units:

- 169th Field Artillery Brigade, at Buckley Space Force Base
  - Headquarters and Headquarters Battery, 169th Field Artillery Brigade, at Buckley Space Force Base
    - Detachment 1, Headquarters and Headquarters Battery, 169th Field Artillery Brigade, in Colorado Springs
  - Company D (Military Intelligence), 572nd Brigade Engineer Battalion, in Denver (part of 86th Infantry Brigade Combat Team)
    - Detachment 1, Company D (Military Intelligence), 572nd Brigade Engineer Battalion, at Buckley Space Force Base (RQ-28A UAV)
    - Detachment 3, Company E (Forward Support), 186th Brigade Support Battalion, in Denver
  - 4th Infantry Division Main Command Post-Operational Detachment, at Fort Carson
  - Cyber Protection Team 174, in Centennial
  - 1st Battalion, 119th Field Artillery Regiment, in Lansing (MI) (M777A2) (Michigan Army National Guard)
  - 1st Battalion, 121st Field Artillery Regiment, in Milwaukee (WI) (M142 HIMARS) (Wisconsin Army National Guard)
  - 3rd Battalion, 157th Field Artillery Regiment, in Colorado Springs (M142 HIMARS)
    - Headquarters and Headquarters Battery, 3rd Battalion, 157th Field Artillery Regiment, in Colorado Springs
    - Battery A, 3rd Battalion, 157th Field Artillery Regiment, in Longmont
    - Battery B, 3rd Battalion, 157th Field Artillery Regiment, in Aurora
    - 188th Forward Support Company, in Pueblo
  - 147th Brigade Support Battalion, in Fort Collins
    - Headquarters and Headquarters Company, 147th Brigade Support Battalion, in Fort Collins
    - 140th Quartermaster Platoon (Field Feeding), at Fort Carson
    - 540th Network Support Company, in Aurora
    - 928th Medical Company (Area Support), at Fort Carson
    - 3650th Ordnance Company (Support Maintenance), in Windsor

== Honors ==
The 169th Brigade headquarters is entitled to the following campaign streamers and decorations for the 157th Infantry Regiment, which was awarded one campaign streamer in World War I and eight campaign streamers and one unit decoration in World War II.

=== Unit decorations ===
Ribbon	Award	Year	Notes
A red ribbon with four vertical dark green stripes in the center.	French Croix de Guerre, World War II (With Palm)	1943–1944	Embroidered "Italy"

=== Campaign streamers ===
Conflict	Streamer	Year(s)
World War I	Streamer without inscription	
World War II	Sicily (with Arrowhead)	1943
World War II	Naples-Foggia (with Arrowhead)	1943
World War II	Anzio (wirth Arrowhead)	1943
World War II	Rome-Arno	1944
World War II	Southern France (with Arrowhead)	1944
World War II	Rhineland	1944—1945
World War II	Ardennes-Alsace	1944—1945
World War II	Central Europe	1945
