= Pro Swooping tour =

The Pro Swooping Tour (PST) is a professional competition circuit for an extreme form of parachuting called "canopy piloting". The PST was formed in 2003 by producer Jim P. Slaton and his associate Lyle Presse. Slaton & Lyle presented the sport's competition format and rules to the International Parachute Committee (IPC) at the 54th annual meeting in Brazil in 2003. The PST's efforts paid off and the IPC accepted the new sport of "Canopy Piloting". The PST created the competition format which gave birth to modern day canopy piloting.

== Tour format ==
Between 2003 and 2007 the PST used a point system to determine the overall ranking of competitors. The PST champion was the pilot who accumulated the most points throughout the competition season. In 2007, the PST transitioned from a point system to an annual championship event at the end of each season. The winner of the annual championships was declared the "Pro Swooping Tour Champion" for that season.

== Events introduced ==
- Bladerunning - 1996
- Speed - 1996
- Distance - 1998
- Accuracy - 2001
- Team Speed - 2002
- Carving Accuracy - 2002
- Freestyle - 2004
- Parabatics - future event

== Achievement history ==
Sport accepted by the International Parachuting Committee (IPC)

Sport accepted by the United States Parachute Association (USPA)

Sport accepted into the Olympic trials

Established a ranking system

Established a set of standard rules

Established a qualification system

Created the Canopy Piloting Circuit (CPC)

== Tour champions ==
2009-NA (comp weathered out)

2008-Nick Batsch

2007-Nick Batsch (championship event) Jeffro Provenzano (point leader)

2006-Chris Hayes runner up Stuart Schoenfeld

2005-Francisco Neri runner up Kaz Sheekey

2004-Jay Moledzki runner up Jim Slaton

2003-Clint Clawson runner up Heath Richardson

== Past tour stops ==
2000 Para-Performance Games-Houston, Texas

2001 Para-Performance Pro Cup-Perris, California Para-Performance Pro Blade-Quincy, Illinois Para-Performance Games-Perris, California

2002 Red Bull Blade Raid Blade running-Elk Meadows, Utah Para-Performance Pro Cup-Perris, California World Freefall Convention-Rantoul, Illinois Para-Performance World Games-Perris, California

2003 Swoop Festival-Panama City Beach, Florida Extreme Week-Voss, Norway South American Open-Rio de Janeiro, Brazil Pro Tour Open-Portland, Oregon World Freefall Convention-Rantoul, Illinois 1st World Cup of Canopy Piloting-Perris, California Baja Challenge-Loreto, Baja Mexico

2004 1st Freestyle Open-Perris, California Swoop Festival-Wildwood, New Jersey U.S. Nationals of Canopy Piloting-Perris, California 2nd Freestyle Open-Perris, California

2005 U.S. Canopy Piloting Grand Prix-Perris, California 1st Ground Launch Blade running-Isabella, California Triple Crown of Freestyle-Atlanta, Georgia Swoop Festival-Chicago, Illinois U.S. Nationals of Canopy Piloting-Perris, California CPC Championships-Denver Colorado GL Blade running Championships-Isabella, California

2006 PST Florida Pro/Am-Lake Wales, Fl PST Mile Hi Canopy Cup-Longmont, Colorado PST Air Festival Show-Longmont, Colorado

2007 PST Air Festival-Mile Hi Skydiving Mile Hi Skydiving Longmont, CO

2008 "Swoop Week" championships Mile Hi Skydiving Longmont, CO

2009 "Swoop Week" championships Skydive Spaceland Houston, Texas
