= Slaton (surname) =

Surname list

Slaton is a surname. Notable people with this name include:

- Bryan Slaton (born 1978), American businessman
- Danielle Slaton (born 1980), American former soccer player
- Dorothy Lamour (born Mary Leta Dorothy Slaton; 1914–1996), American actress
- James D. Slaton (1910/12–1961), American U.S. Army corporal
- Jessie Pharr Slaton (1908–1983), American lawyer
- Jim M. Slaton (born 1950), American football pitcher
- Jim P. Slaton (born 1970), American skydiver
- John M. Slaton (1866–1955), American former governor of Georgia
- Mike Slaton (born 1964), American former football player
- Steve Slaton (born 1986), American former football running back
- Steve Slaton (DJ) (born 1953), American DJ
- Tedarrell Slaton (born 1997), American football nose tackle
- Tony Slaton (born 1961), American former football player
- The Slaton family, titular stars of 1000-lb Sisters

== See also ==
- Slaton, Texas
- Slatton
