= 188th Antiaircraft Artillery Battalion (United States) =

- Active: 1955-1959
- Country: United States
- Allegiance: Colorado
- Branch: Colorado Army National Guard
- Type: Antiaircraft
- Role: Automatic weapons
- Size: Battalion
- Part of: Army Anti-Aircraft Command (ARAACOM)
- Motto(s): Verba Rebus Proba, (prove your words by your deeds)
- Mascot(s): Oozlefinch

The 188th Antiaircraft Artillery Battalion was an Antiaircraft Battalion of the United States Army.

== Lineage ==
Constituted 28 June 1955 as the 188th Antiaircraft Artillery Battalion (Automatic Weapons)(Self Propelled) and allotted to the Colorado National Guard. Organized 1 August 1955 from existing organizations as follows-

- Company C 193rd Tank Battalion (organized in the Colorado National Guard as Battery A, Field Artillery, Colorado National Guard and federally recognized 15 June 1921 at Pueblo; Redesignated 1 November 1921 as Battery A 158th Field Artillery; redesignated 1 May 1922 as Battery C 158th Field Artillery; redesignated 1 July 1926 as Battery C 168th Field Artillery Battalion (horse); redesignated 1 August 1933 as Battery C 168th Field Artillery; redesignated 1 September 1933 as Battery F 168th Field Artillery; Inducted into federal service 24 February 1941 at Pueblo; redesignated 1 March 1943 as Battery C 983rd Field Artillery Battalion; Inactivated 19 December 1945 at Camp Stoneman, California; redesignated 10 May 1946 as Company C 193rd Tank Battalion; reorganized and federally recognized 18 April 1947 at Pueblo; redesignated Company C 193rd Heavy Tank Battalion; ordered into active federal service 3 September 1950 at Pueblo; released from active federal service 2 July 1952 and resumed state status and redesignated 1 December 1952 as Company C 193rd Tank Battalion) Converted and redesignated Headquarters and Headquarters Battery
- Heavy Mortar Company 157th Infantry (Organized in the Colorado National Guard as Headquarters Battery and Combat train 1st Battalion 168th Field Artillery and federally recognized 30 April 1947 at Durango; redesignated 1 July 1940 as Headquarters Battery 1st Battalion 168th Field artillery; inducted into federal service 24 February 1941 at Durango; redesignated 1 March 1943 as Headquarters Battery 168th Field Artillery Battalion; inactivated 17 January 1946 at Camp Stoneman, California; redesignated 10 May 1946 as Cannon Company 157th Infantry; reorganized and federally recognized 12 January 1947 at Durango and redesignated 1 December 1948 as Heavy Mortar Company 157th Infantry) redesignated Battery A.
- Detachment 1, Heavy Mortar Company 157th Infantry (organized in the Colorado National Guard and federally recognized 25 May 1950 at Cortez) redesignated detachment 1, Battery A.
- Company B 199th Engineer Battalion (Organized in the Colorado National Guard as Troop D 1st Separate Squadron of Cavalry and federally recognized 7 October 1920 at Monte Vista; redesignated 1 November 1921 as Troop D 111th Cavalry; redesignated 1 February 1922 as Troop A 117th Cavalry; redesignated 26 June 1931 as Troop A 117th Separate Cavalry Squadron; Converted and redesignated 1 August 1933 as Battery D 168th Field Artillery; inducted into federal service 24 February 1941 at Monte Vista; redesignated 1 March 1943 as Battery A 983rd Field Artillery Battalion; inactivated 19 December 1945 at Camp Stoneman, Ca.; redesignated 10 May 1946 as Company D 193rd Tank Battalion; reorganized and federally recognized 19 April 1947 at Monte Vista; redesignated 1 November 1949 as Company D 193rd Heavy Tank Battalion; ordered into active federal service 3 September 1950 at Monte Vista; relieved from active federal service 1 August 1952 and resumed state status; redesignated 1 December 1952 as Company D 193rd Tank Battalion and redesignated Company B 199th Engineer Battalion in January 1955) redesignated Battery B.
- Company A 199th Engineer Battalion (Organized in the Colorado National Guard as Company A 199th Combat Engineer Battalion and federally recognized 14 November 1947 at Alamosa; ordered into federal service 11 September 1950 at Alamosa; redesignated 1 February 1953 as Company A 199th Engineer Battalion; released from federal service 17 January 1955 and resumed state status) redesignated Battery C.
- Company B 193rd Tank Battalion (Organized in the Colorado National Guard as Company B 193rd Tank Battalion and federally recognized 18 April 1947 at Pueblo; redesignated 1 November 1949 as Company B 193rd Heavy Tank Battalion; ordered into federal service 3 September 1950 at Pueblo; released from federal service 1 August 1952 and resumed state status and redesignated 1 December 1952 as Company B 193rd Tank Battalion) redesignated Battery D.
- Medical Detachment 199th Engineer Battalion (Organized in the Colorado National Guard and federally recognized 11 December 1952 at Alamosa) redesignated Medical Detachment.

Consolidated 1 February 1959 with the 157th Field Artillery, a parent regiment under the Combat Arms Regimental System

== Campaign streamers ==
World War II

- New Guinea
- Leyte
- Luzon
- Southern Philippines

== Decorations ==
Philippine Presidential Unit Citation, Streamer embroidered 17 OCTOBER 1944 to 4 JULY 1945 (983rd Field Artillery Battalion cited DAGO 47,1950
