= Charles Morris Ankcorn =

American soldier and academic (1893–1955)

- Born: September 11, 1893; Palouse, Washington, U.S.
- Died: October 1, 1955 (aged 62)
- Allegiance: United States
- Branch: United States Army
- Rank: Brigadier General
- Commands: 157th Infantry Regiment
- Conflicts: World I, World II
- Awards: Distinguished Service Cross
- Other work: Professor of Military Science at State College of Washington

Charles Morris Ankcorn (September 11, 1893 - October 1, 1955) was professor of military science at State College of Washington and Brigadier General in the U.S Army during World War II.

== Early life and career ==
Charles M. Ankcorn was born on September 11, 1893 in Palouse, Washington. Prior to military service, Ankcorn attended the University of Idaho and Ohio State University. During World War I, he was assigned to the infantry during 1917. Following the war, he was professor of military science and tactics at State College of Washington from 1924 to 1929.

== World War II ==
Ankcorn was a Regular Army instructor assigned to the Colorado National Guard. In 1940, he replaced Colonel Rudolph J. Seyfried as commander of the 157th Infantry Regiment, after Seyfried was disqualified for medical reasons. Ankcorn commanded the regiment from September 1940 to September 1943, seeing his first action during the Allied invasion of Sicily. He was awarded the Distinguished Service Cross, and in September 1943, was promoted to the rank of brigadier general. That month, he was injured when his jeep ran over a land mine, costing him his right leg. He returned to the U.S. in January 1944.

== Later life ==
Ankcorn retired from military service in December, 1944. Ankcorn died on October 1, 1955.

== Awards ==
=== Distinguished Service Cross ===
==== Citation ====
Colonel (Infantry) Charles M. Ankcorn, United States Army, was awarded the Distinguished Service Cross for extraordinary heroism in connection with military operations against an armed enemy while serving with the 157th Infantry Regiment, 45th Infantry Division, in action against enemy forces in July 1943. Colonel Ankcorn's outstanding leadership, personal bravery and zealous devotion to duty exemplify the highest traditions of the military forces of the United States and reflect great credit upon himself, the 45th Infantry Division, and the United States Army.
