= Almond E. Fisher =

US army officer (1913–1982)

Almond Edward Fisher
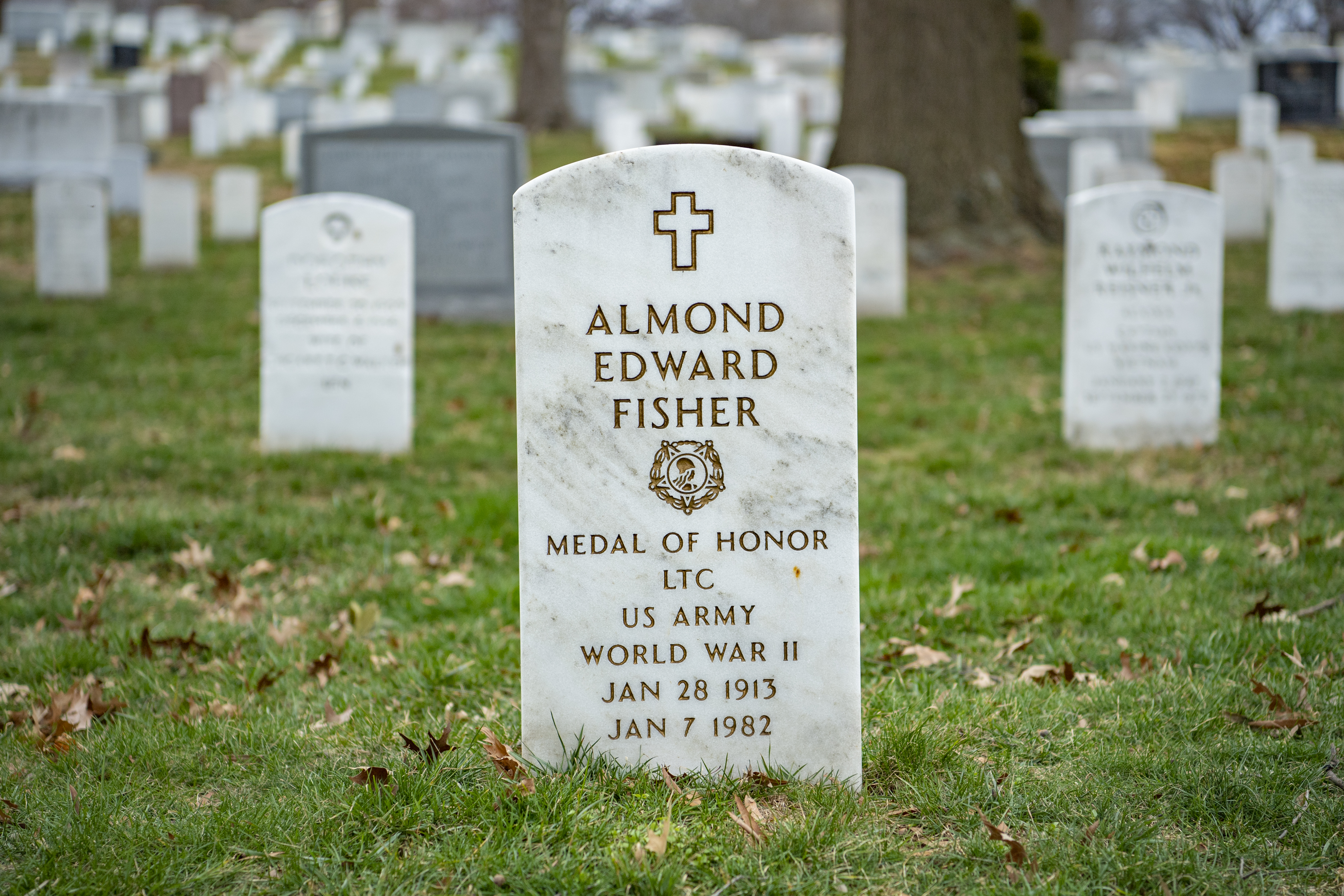
- Grave at Arlington National Cemetery
- Born: January 28, 1913; Hume, New York, US
- Died: January 7, 1982 (aged 68)
- Burial place: Arlington National Cemetery
- Military career
- Allegiance: United States
- Branch: United States Army
- Service years: 1935 - 1964
- Rank: Lieutenant Colonel
- Units: 157th Infantry Regiment, 45th Infantry Division
- Conflicts: World War II
- Awards: Medal of Honor; Bronze Star Medal; Purple Heart; Combat Infantryman Badge

Almond Edward Fisher (January 28, 1913 – January 7, 1982) was a United States Army officer and a recipient of the United States military's highest decoration—the Medal of Honor—for his actions in World War II.

== Biography ==
Fisher joined the Army in 1935 from Brooklyn, New York, and served five years as an enlisted man in Panama. He deployed to Europe in June, 1943, and fought in Italy and Southern France before the action which won him the Army's highest award for heroism and also the Purple Heart. On September 13, 1944, he was serving as a second lieutenant in Company E, 2nd Battalion, 157th Infantry Regiment, 45th Infantry Division. In the early morning hours of that day, near Grammont, France, he led a platoon in an attack on German positions. Throughout the advance, he repeatedly went forward alone and silenced German machine gun emplacements. Just before daybreak, he ordered the platoon to dig in and hold their position. During the ensuing German counter-attack, he was wounded in both feet but refused medical aid and continued to crawl among his men, giving them encouragement and direction. For these actions, he was awarded the Medal of Honor seven months later, on April 23, 1945. General Joseph T. McNarney, Deputy Supreme Allied Commander in the Mediterranean Theater and commanding general of U.S. Army Forces, Mediterranean Theater, presented now First Lieutenant Fisher his Medal of Honor at a public ceremony outside Rome, Italy, in May 1945. In late July 1945, Fisher arrived at the Army's redistribution station in Asheville, North Carolina, to be processed for discharge from active duty.

Fisher served an additional 19 years in the New York Army National Guard and attained the rank of Lieutenant Colonel before retiring. He died at age 68 and was buried in Arlington National Cemetery, Arlington County, Virginia.

== Medal of Honor Citation ==
Fisher's official Medal of Honor citation reads:

For conspicuous gallantry and intrepidity at the risk of his life above and beyond the call of duty on the night of 12-September 13, 1944, near Grammont, France. In the darkness of early morning, 2d Lt. Fisher was leading a platoon of Company E, 157th Infantry, in single column to the attack of a strongly defended hill position. At 2:30 A.M., the forward elements were brought under enemy machinegun fire from a distance of not more than 20 yards. Working his way alone to within 20 feet of the gun emplacement, he opened fire with his carbine and killed the entire guncrew. A few minutes after the advance was resumed, heavy machinegun fire was encountered from the left flank. Again crawling forward alone under withering fire, he blasted the gun and crew from their positions with hand grenades. After a halt to replenish ammunition, the advance was again resumed and continued for 1 hour before being stopped by intense machinegun and rifle fire. Through the courageous and skillful leadership of 2d Lt. Fisher, the pocket of determined enemy resistance was rapidly obliterated. Spotting an emplaced machine pistol a short time later, with 1 of his men he moved forward and destroyed the position. As the advance continued the fire fight became more intense. When a bypassed German climbed from his foxhole and attempted to tear an M1 rifle from the hands of 1 of his men, 2d Lt. Fisher whirled and killed the enemy with a burst from his carbine. About 30 minutes later the platoon came under the heavy fire of machine-guns from across an open field. 2d Lt. Fisher, disregarding the terrific fire, moved across the field with no cover or concealment to within range, knocked the gun from the position and killed or wounded the crew. Still under heavy fire he returned to his platoon and continued the advance. Once again heavy fire was encountered from a machinegun directly in front. Calling for hand grenades, he found only 2 remaining in the entire platoon. Pulling the pins and carrying a grenade in each hand, he crawled toward the gun emplacement, moving across areas devoid of cover and under intense fire to within 15 yards when he threw the grenades, demolished the gun and killed the guncrew. With ammunition low and daybreak near, he ordered his men to dig in and hold the ground already won. Under constant fire from the front and from both flanks, he moved among them directing the preparations for the defense. Shortly after the ammunition supply was replenished, the Germans launched a last determined effort against the depleted group. Attacked by superior numbers from the front, right, and left flank, and even from the rear, the platoon, in bitter hand-to-hand engagements drove back the enemy at every point. Wounded in both feet by close-range machine pistol fire early in the battle, 2d Lt. Fisher refused medical attention. Unable to walk, he crawled from man to man encouraging them and checking each position. Only after the fighting had subsided did 2d Lt. Fisher crawl 300 yards to the aid station from which he was evacuated. His extraordinary heroism, magnificent valor, and aggressive determination in the face of pointblank enemy fire is an inspiration to his organization and reflects the finest traditions of the U.S. Armed Forces.

== Military Awards ==
Fisher's military decorations and awards include:

Badge	Combat Infantryman Badge		
1st Row	Medal of Honor		
2nd Row	Bronze Star Medal	Purple Heart	Army Good Conduct Medal
3rd Row	American Defense Service Medal with "Foreign Service" Clasp	American Campaign Medal	European–African–Middle Eastern Campaign Medal with 8 campaign stars
4th Row	World War II Victory Medal	Army of Occupation Medal with "Germany" clasp	National Defense Service Medal
Unit awards	Presidential Unit Citation		

== See also ==
- List of Medal of Honor recipients for World War II
