= Jeff Provenzano =

American professional skydiver (born 1976)

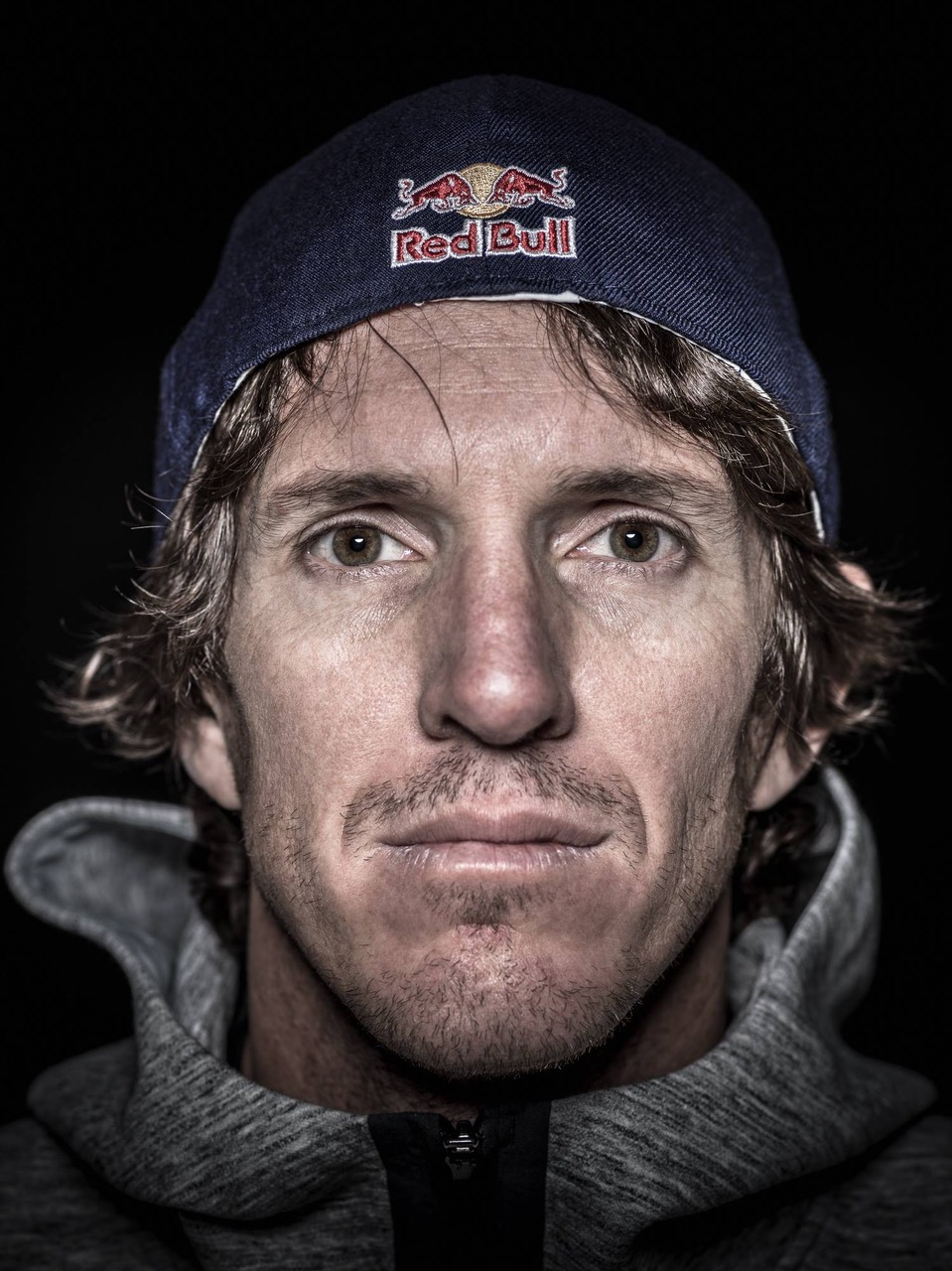
- Born: September 12, 1976 (age 49); Greenwich, Connecticut, United States
- Education: School of Visual Arts
- Occupations: Skydiver, wingsuit flyer, BASE jumper
- Years active: 1995–present

Jeff "Jeffro" Provenzano (born September 12, 1976) is an American professional skydiver, wingsuit flyer, BASE jumper, HALO jumper and stuntman. He is a member of the Red Bull Air Force, and is considered to be a pioneer of the skydiving discipline of swooping.

== Early life and education ==
Provenzano was born in Greenwich, Connecticut, and raised in Port Chester, New York. He graduated from the School of Visual Arts in New York City.

== Career ==
=== Skydiving, BASE jumping and wingsuit flying ===
Provenzano started skydiving in 1995. In 2009, he joined the Red Bull Air Force, Red Bull's official aerial sports team. He has invented several acrobatic skydiving moves, the best known of which is The Miracle Man. As of October 2016, he has over 17,000 jumps logged. As a member of the Red Bull Air Force, Provenzano participated in and helped organize a wingsuit flight over Manhattan to promote the 2014 Bethpage Air Show at Jones Beach on Long Island. After jumping off a plane 7,500 feet above Manhattan, they traveled two miles in two minutes, from the Financial District to the Hudson River, flying up to 120 mph in their wingsuits. Other notable jumps include: on August 27, 2013, Provenzano and fellow Red Bull Air Force member Miles Daisher BASE jumped off the 45-story Four Seasons Hotel Denver; Skydive Chicago in 2015, where Provenzano was part of a team of 164 linked skydivers flying in a predetermined formation at speeds up to 175 mph to set a new vertical freefly world record; and on February 29, 2016, the Red Bull team skydived out of a helicopter, with Provenzano and Jon Devore performing aerial tricks before landing in the middle of the lawn in front of the National World War I Museum and Memorial in Kansas City, Missouri.

=== Film, video and commercials ===
Provenzano appears in a scene in Iron Man 3 that took a month to shoot. In the film, 13 civilians get sucked out of an airplane and Iron Man flies to their rescue. But he can only carry four of them at a time, so they have to make a human chain in the sky while falling to the ground at 100 mph. Provenzano also did stunts for the 2014 film Godzilla. He appeared on the first season of the US version of Top Gear in 2010, doing a high-altitude low-opening (HALO) skydive from 25,000 feet in a race to the finish line against host Tanner Foust in a modified Ford F-150 SVT Raptor. Provenzano won the race. In October 2016, Provenzano released a short film called After Dark, combining choreographed flying, lighting effects and a wind tunnel, tracing his flight pattern in an LED suit. It was shot at iFly's wind tunnel in Yonkers, New York, and was inspired in part by New York City nightlife.

In 2015, in a stunt for a commercial for the Nvidia Shield Android TV streaming device, Provenzano jumped out of an airplane in a 10,000-foot freefall while sitting strapped to a couch surrounded by a television, coffee table, and other items found in a regular living room. Sitting on the couch as it falls out of the airplane, Provenzano watches television and plays video games, unstrapping himself before landing safely as the rest of the living room crashes to the ground.

== Championships ==
Provenzano was the 2007 Overall Champion of the Pro Swooping Tour, and won the U.S. Pond Swoop Nationals for four consecutive years. He won the championship at the 2011 Dubai World Cup Freestyle, and the Vertical Relative Work World Cup Championship.

== Personal life ==
Provenzano lives in Eloy, Arizona.

== Filmography ==
- Iron Man 3 – skydiving team (2013)
- Godzilla – stunts (2014)
- After Dark (short film, 2016)
