= Air sports at the 2005 World Games – Canopy piloting =

Canopy piloting at the World Games
- Venue: Toeppersee Nordufer Duisburg, Duisburg, Germany
- Date: 15–17 July 2005
- Competitors: 10 from 6 nations

Medalists
1st place, gold medalist(s)		Jay Moledzki	Canada
2nd place, silver medalist(s)		Shannon Pilcher	United States
3rd place, bronze medalist(s)		Clint Clawson	United States

The canopy piloting event at the 2005 World Games in Duisburg was played from 15 to 17 July. 10 parachuters, from 6 nations, participated in the tournament. The competition took place at Toeppersee Nordufer Duisburg.

== Competition format ==
Athletes competed in three events: accuracy, distance and speed. In each event they had to compete two times.

== Results ==
Rank	Nation	Athlete	Accuracy		Distance		Speed		Total
Rank	Nation	Athlete	Result	Rank	Result	Rank	Result	Rank	Total
1st place, gold medalist(s)	Canada	Jay Moledzki	162	2	219.3	1	4.96	1	4
2nd place, silver medalist(s)	United States	Shannon Pilcher	170	1	175.1	2	5.48	2	5
3rd place, bronze medalist(s)	United States	Clint Clawson	159	4	155.0	4	6.30	5	13
4	United States	Jonathan Tagle	69	8	161.1	3	5.51	3	14
5	Venezuela	Francisco Neri	162	2	151.8	6	13.43	8	16
6	Belgium	Bruno Brokken	94	5	151.8	6	6.33	6	17
7	United States	John Colclasure	70	7	125.6	8	5.62	4	19
8	Canada	John Zuliani	13	9	153.9	5	12.72	7	21
9	Germany	Tobias Scherrinsky	94	5	65.0	9	13.69	9	23
10	Australia	Andrew Lipinski	0	10	20.0	10	20.00	10	30
