= Slatton =

Slatton is a surname. Notable people with the surname include:

- C. S. Slatton (1895–1951), American judge
- James Slatton (born 1947), American water polo player
- Traci L. Slatton (born 1963), American author

== See also ==
- Slaton (surname)
