= Edward G. Wilkin =

United States Army soldier

- Born: May 25, 1917; Burlington, Vermont, US
- Died: April 18, 1945 (aged 27); Germany
- Burial place: Longmeadow Cemetery, Longmeadow, Massachusetts
- Military career
- Allegiance: United States of America
- Branch: United States Army
- Service years: 1943 - 1945
- Rank: Corporal
- Units: 157th Infantry Regiment, 45th Infantry Division
- Conflicts: World War II
- Awards: Medal of Honor

Edward G. Wilkin (May 25, 1917 – April 18, 1945) was a United States Army soldier who was a recipient of the Medal of Honor — the United States military's highest decoration — for his actions fighting in World War II. Working ahead of his unit he engaged German forces single-handedly and then aided another unit in clearing casualties to safety in the face of enemy fire. He was killed a month later.

== Biography ==
Wilkin joined the Army from Longmeadow, Massachusetts in December 1943.

On March 18, 1945, he was serving as a corporal in Company C, 157th Infantry Regiment, 45th Infantry Division. During a firefight on that day, on the Siegfried Line in Germany, Wilkin repeatedly went ahead of his unit and engaged the German forces alone, and later evacuated wounded soldiers from the battlefield despite heavy enemy fire. He was killed in action exactly one month later, and was posthumously awarded the Medal of Honor on December 17, 1945.

Wilkin was buried in Longmeadow Cemetery, Longmeadow, Massachusetts.

== Medal of Honor citation ==
Corporal Wilkin's official Medal of Honor citation reads:

He spearheaded his unit's assault of the Siegfried Line in Germany. Heavy fire from enemy riflemen and camouflaged pillboxes had pinned down his comrades when he moved forward on his own initiative to reconnoiter a route of advance. He cleared the way into an area studded with pillboxes, where he repeatedly stood up and walked into vicious enemy fire, storming 1 fortification after another with automatic rifle fire and grenades, killing enemy troops, taking prisoners as the enemy defense became confused, and encouraging his comrades by his heroic example. When halted by heavy barbed wire entanglements, he secured bangalore torpedoes and blasted a path toward still more pillboxes, all the time braving bursting grenades and mortar shells and direct rifle and automatic-weapons fire. He engaged in fierce fire fights, standing in the open while his adversaries fought from the protection of concrete emplacements, and on 1 occasion pursued enemy soldiers across an open field and through interlocking trenches, disregarding the crossfire from 2 pillboxes until he had penetrated the formidable line 200 yards in advance of any American element. That night, although terribly fatigued, he refused to rest and insisted on distributing rations and supplies to his comrades. Hearing that a nearby company was suffering heavy casualties, he secured permission to guide litter bearers and assist them in evacuating the wounded. All that night he remained in the battle area on his mercy missions, and for the following 2 days he continued to remove casualties, venturing into enemy-held territory, scorning cover and braving devastating mortar and artillery bombardments. In 3 days he neutralized and captured 6 pillboxes single-handedly, killed at least 9 Germans, wounded 13, took 13 prisoners, aided in the capture of 14 others, and saved many American lives by his fearless performance as a litter bearer. Through his superb fighting skill, dauntless courage, and gallant, inspiring actions, Cpl. Wilkin contributed in large measure to his company's success in cracking the Siegfried Line. One month later he was killed in action while fighting deep in Germany.

== See also ==
- List of Medal of Honor recipients
- List of Medal of Honor recipients for World War II
