= 137th Field Artillery Battalion (United States) =

US National Guard unit

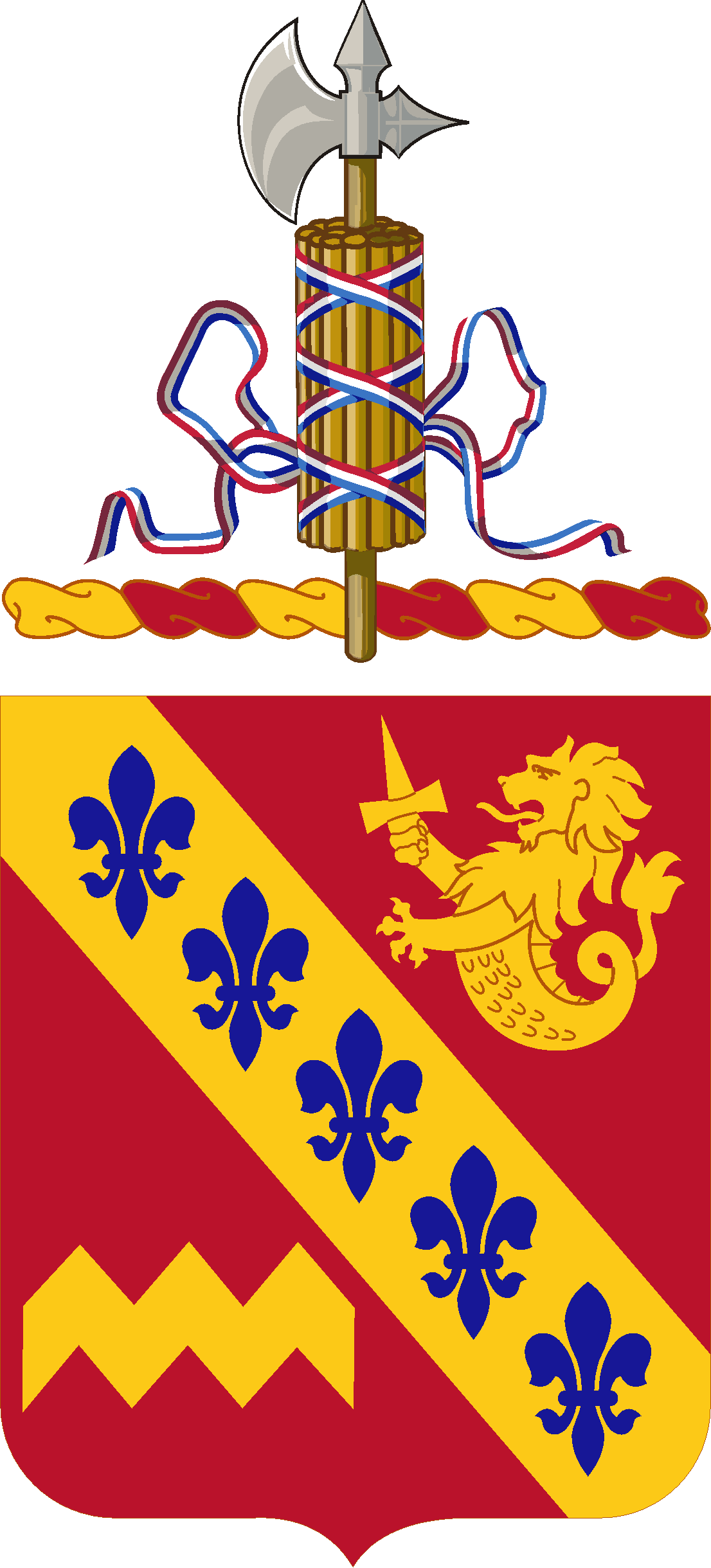
- Coat of arms
- Active: 1899
- Country: United States
- Allegiance: Colorado
- Branch: United States Army
- Type: Field artillery
- Part of: Colorado Army National Guard
- Motto(s): Remember the Mission

The 137th Field Artillery Battalion is a field artillery battalion of the Army National Guard.

== History ==
The 137th Field Artillery Battalion is not to be confused with the 137th Field Artillery Regiment. In 1959 the majority of the unit became the 140th Signal Battalion which has been pared down to one company (A Company).

== Lineage ==
Constituted in the Colorado National Guard as Company G, 1st Colorado Infantry and organized in April 1899 at Denver.

Mustered out of state service 21 December 1904; reorganized in state service 10 February 1909 as Company G, 1st Infantry

Mustered out of state service 17 July 1911; reorganized in state service 28 July 1911 as Company G. 1st Infantry

Redesignated 30 September 1911 as Battery B, 1st Battalion Field Artillery.

Redesignated 20 October 1914 separate Battery B, Field Artillery

Mustered into Federal service 4 July 1916 at Golden for Mexican Border duty.

Redesignated 5 July 1916 as Battery B,1st Separate Battalion, Colorado Field Artillery.

Mustered out of federal service 6 March 1917 at Fort D. A. Russell Wyoming.

Drafted into Federal service, 5 August 1917, Redesignated Battery B, 148th Field Artillery. and assigned to the 41st Infantry Division. 19 September 1917.

Demobilized 29 June 1919 at Fort D. A. Russell

Redesignated 1 October 1921 as Battery B, 1st Battalion, 158th Field Artillery.

Redesignated 1 July 1926 as Battery B, 168th Field Artillery Battalion.

Redesignated 1 August 1933 as Battery B, 168th Field Artillery Battalion.

Inactivated 17 January 1946 at Camp Stoneman, California

Reorganized and Federally recognized 1 August 1955 as Headquarters and Headquarters Battery 137th Field Artillery Battalion; Concurrently organic elements organized by conversion and redesignation of existing units as follows;

- Company F, 157th Infantry at Boulder, redesignated Battery A.
- Company H, 157th Infantry at Fort Collins, redesignated Battery B.
- Headquarters, Headquarters and Service Company, 199th Engineer Battalion at Camp George West, redesignated Battery C.

Battalion broken up 1 February 1959 and elements converted and redesignated as follows;

- Headquarters and Headquarters Battery at Denver, redesignated Headquarters and Headquarters Company, 140th Signal Battalion.
- Battery A at Boulder redesignated Battery A. 1st Howitzer Battalion 157th Field Artillery
- Battery B at Fort Collins redesignated Company B, 140th Signal Battalion
- Battery C at Golden redesignated as Company C, 140th Signal Battalion.

== Campaign streamers ==
World War I

- Champagne-Marne
- Aisne-Marne
- St. Mihiel
- Meuse-Argonne
- Champagne 1918

World War II

- New Guinea (With Arrowhead)
- Luzon

== Decorations ==
Philippine Presidential Unit Citation, Streamer embroidered 17 October 1944 to 4 July 1945.

== Current units ==
unit broken up.

== Coat of arms ==
- Shield

Gules, on a bend between in dexter chief a sea lion holding in dexter paw a sword and in sinister base a bar dancette couped or, five fleurs-de-lis paleways azure.

- Crest

That for the regiments and separate battalions of the Colorado National guard

- background

The colors scarlet and yellow are used for artillery. the five fleurs-de-lis on the diagonal band symbolize the units World War I service in France. The sea lion, from the coat of arms of Manila, represent service in the Pacific theater during World War II. The jagged bar with 3 peaks refers to the mountainous terrain of Colorado, The home area of the battalion.

== See also ==
- Field Artillery Branch (United States)
- U.S. Army Regimental System
