= Jay Moledzki =

Canadian skydiver/canopy pilot

Medal record

Representing Canada

Men's Parachuting

World Championships
Silver medal – second place	2006 Vienna, Austria	Canopy Piloting (speed)
Silver medal – second place	2006 Vienna, Austria	Canopy Piloting (distance)
Bronze medal – third place	2006 Vienna, Austria	Canopy Piloting (overall)
Gold medal – first place	2008 Pretoria, South Africa	Canopy Piloting (accuracy)
Silver medal – second place	2008 Pretoria, South Africa	Canopy Piloting (speed)
Gold medal – first place	2008 Pretoria, South Africa	Canopy Piloting (overall)
Gold medal – first place	2010 Kolomna, Russia	Canopy Piloting (accuracy)
Gold medal – first place	2010 Kolomna, Russia	Canopy Piloting (speed)
Bronze medal – third place	2010 Kolomna, Russia	Canopy Piloting (distance)
Gold medal – first place	2010 Kolomna, Russia	Canopy Piloting (overall)
Bronze medal – third place	2012 Dubai, UAE	Canopy Piloting (speed)
Silver medal – second place	2012 Dubai, UAE	Canopy Piloting (distance)

Jay Moledzki is a Canadian skydiver/canopy pilot. Moledzki is noted for having won many medals in canopy piloting since the first Canopy Piloting World Parachuting Championships in Vienna, Austria in 2006, the second Canopy Piloting World Championships in Pretoria, South Africa in 2008, the third Canopy Piloting World Championships in Kolomna, Russia in 2010, and the fourth Canopy Piloting World Championships in Dubai, UAE in 2012.
