= 193rd Tank Battalion (United States) =

- Active: 1940–1945; 1947–1955
- Country: United States
- Branch: Colorado Army National Guard
- Type: Armor
- Motto: PROMPTNESS AND ENERGY
- Engagements: World War II

Commanders
- Notable commanders: Lieutenant Colonel Harmon L. Edmondson

The 193rd Tank Battalion was a battalion of the United States Army during World War II. It was briefly reformed in the Colorado Army National Guard postwar.

The unit's history is primarily that of the 193rd Tank Battalion which served in the Pacific theater during World War II with the 27th Infantry Division, throughout, and during the Korean war. The battalion provided amphibious assault vehicles during the Gilberts assault/Operation Galvanic for the Battle of Makin, the assault on Butaritari, known to the U.S. troops at the time as Makin Island.

== History ==
The battalion was Constituted 1 September 1940 in the National Guard as the 193rd Tank Battalion and partially organized by redesignation of divisional light tank companies from various states:

- 30th Tank Company (Light), Georgia National Guard, (Forsyth GA,) as Company A
- 31st Tank Company (Light), Alabama National Guard, (Ozark, AL,) as Company B
- 36th Tank Company (Light), Texas National Guard, (Houston, TX,) as Company C
- 45th Tank Company (Light), Colorado National Guard, (Denver, CO,) as Company D

The organization was completed and battalion inducted into Federal service on 20 January 1941 at Fort Benning, Georgia. The Headquarters Company was organized at Fort Benning from personnel of companies which had been inducted 8 January 1941 at home stations

After the war, the battalion was inactivated 21 January 1946 at Vancouver Barracks, Washington. The same year, the battalion was allotted, less lettered companies, to the Colorado National Guard 10 May 1946. The 983rd Field Artillery Battalion was consolidated with the 193rd Tank Battalion. The lineage of Company B was perpetuated by Alabama's 131st Tank Battalion,

Battalion organized and Federally recognized 17 April 1947 with headquarters at Colorado Springs. Battalion reorganized and redesignated 1 November 1949 as the 193rd Heavy Tank Battalion. Battalion ordered into active federal service at Colorado Springs 3 September 1950. The battalion released from active Federal service and reverted to state control on 1 August 1952

Battalion redesignated 1 December 1952 back to 193rd Tank Battalion.

Battalion broken up 1 August 1955. Headquarters and Service Company converted and redesignated as Headquarters and Headquarters Battery, 169th Field Artillery Battalion; concurrently, remainder of battalion organized from existing units as follows
Company A, 193rd Tank Battalion (Canon City) redesignated Battery A

- Service Company, 157th Infantry (Englewood) redesignated Battery B
- Company I, 157th Infantry (Burlington) redesignated Service Battery
- Medical Detachment, 193rd Tank Battalion (Colorado Springs) redesignated Medical Detachment.

Battalion broken up 1 February 1959 and elements converted, redesignated or consolidated as follows;

- Headquarters and Headquarters Battery, Battery C, and Medical Detachment at Colorado Springs consolidated and redesignated as Company D, 140th Signal Battalion.
- Battery A at Canon City redesignated as Service Battery, 2nd Howitzer Battalion, 157th Field Artillery
- Service Battery at Burlington redesignated as the 928th Medical Company.

== Campaign streamers ==
World War I Streamer without inscription World War II

- Central Pacific
- New Guinea
- Leyte
- Luzon
- Southern Philippines
- Sicily (With Arrowhead)
- Naples Foggia (With Arrowhead)
- Anzio
- Rome-Arno
- Southern France (With Arrowhead)
- Rhineland
- Ardennes-Alsace
- Central Europe

== Decorations ==
Philippine Presidential Unit Citation, streamer embroidered 17 October 1944 to 4 July 1945

== Coat of arms ==
- Shield - Per fess indented azure and or, in chief a fleur-de-lis argent, in base a sheathed Roman sword, point to base and a snake coiled to strike vert
- Crest - The crest is that of the Colorado Army National Guard
- Background - The shield is blue and yellow in reference to early service of the 983rd Field Artillery Battalion as infantry and Cavalry. The fleur-de-lis indicates service in France during World War I while the Roman sword and snake refer to service during the war with Spain, and on the Mexican border respectively. The yellow base of the shield is representative of the plains of eastern Colorado and the indented division of the shield the mountainous portion of the state against the skyline.
