= Jim P. Slaton =

James Paul Slaton (born December 31, 1970, in Amarillo, Texas) is a professional skydiver and founder of the Pro Swooping Tour, the Canopy Piloting Circuit, and the Ground Launch Center.

== Military career ==
Slaton signed up with the US Army as a forward observer in 1991, and graduated from the Air Force's Close Air Support School, the US Army's Air Assault School, and then the US Army Airborne School and the 75th Ranger Regiment Ranger Indoctrination program at Ft. Benning, GA. He also completed the Navy's Survival, Evasion, Resistance and Escape and Cold Weather Environmental Survival training at the Naval Air Station in Brunswick, Maine, and was honorably discharged from the US Army as a Sergeant in 1998.

== Parachuting career ==
In 1999 Slaton signed on with NZ Aerosports flying their Icarus Canopies range and later that year he started a parachute factory team in the new sport of canopy piloting, or "swooping." In 2000 he produced the swooping competition, the Para-Performance Games (PPGS), and hosted the first event at Skydive Houston in Houston, Texas. The PPGS had three competition events in Speed, Accuracy and Distance. In 2001 he produced the Canopy piloting School that teaches parachute swooping at Perris Valley Skydiving, California, and in 2003 created the first professional swooping, the Pro Swooping Tour. He produced, directed and edited the Pro Swooping Tour's 2003 DVD entitled "The year of Canopy Piloting" in 2003, and with members of Team Extreme produced the documentary "Out of the Blue".

He got the new sport of canopy piloting accepted at the 54th annual meeting of the International Parachuting Commission in Brazil in 2003, after which he helped organize the 1st World Cup of Canopy Piloting at Perris Valley Skydiving, California, in 2003.

In 2004 he was the 1st U.S. National Canopy Piloting Champion at Perris Valley Skydiving, California, flying his own signature series parachute called the "JVX.

In 2005, he started Ground Launch Center, the first school for the sport of ground launching.

He created the World Parachute Stunt Team and the first amateur swooping tour, the Canopy Piloting Circuit in 2005.

In February 2006, he and his associate Duane Hall flew into each other while filming a parachute stunt in Lake Isabella, California. Slaton survived but was in a coma for three days, suffering a shattered hip, broken leg, broken shoulder and frontal lobe head injury. Duane Hall did survive the crash.

He organized the annual Swoop Week Championships of canopy piloting between 2007 and 2009 in Longmont, Colorado and Houston, Texas.
