= Grammont, Haute-Saône =

Grammont
- Commune
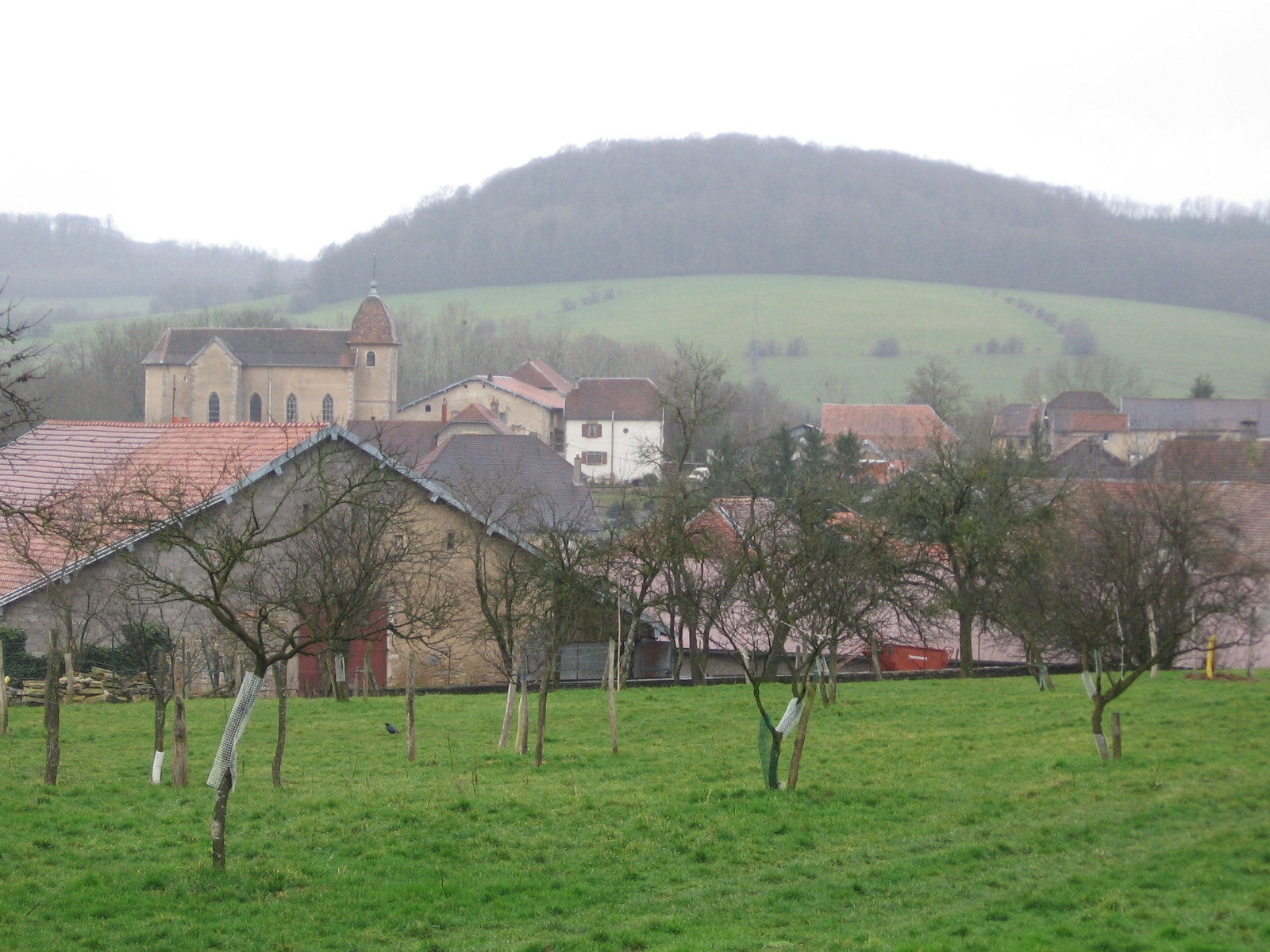
- Grammont in 2007

- Coat of arms
- Location of Grammont
- Location within France Location within Bourgogne-Franche-Comté
- Coordinates: 47°30′56″N 6°31′02″E
- Country: France
- Region: Bourgogne-Franche-Comté
- Department: Haute-Saône
- Arrondissement: Lure
- Canton: Villersexel
- Area^{1}: 5.94 km^{2} (2.29 sq mi)
- Highest elevation: 515 m (1,690 ft)
- Lowest elevation: 283 m (928 ft)
- Population (2023): 67
  - Density: 11/km^{2} (29/sq mi)
- Time zone: UTC+01:00 (CET)
  - Summer (DST): UTC+02:00 (CEST)
- INSEE/Postal code: 70273 /70110
- ^{1} French Land Register data, which excludes lakes, ponds, glaciers > 1 km^{2} (0.386 sq mi or 247 acres) and river estuaries.

Grammont (French pronunciation: [ɡʁamɔ̃]) is a commune in the Haute-Saône department in the region of Bourgogne-Franche-Comté in eastern France.

== Geography ==
Grammont is located in the north of the Bourgogne-Franche-Comté, 10 km from Villersexel and 10 km from L'Isle-sur-le-Doubs. The village's name is the combination of the adjective for "large" and the name "mount".

The average altitude of Grammont is 350 m.

The village had 374 inhabitants at the time of the French Revolution of 1789, and 422 during the reign of King Louis-Philippe. As of 2021, the village had only 68 inhabitants.

=== Geology ===
The communal area is based on the Keupérien coalfield Haute-Saône (it is part of the concession Mélecey operated from 1778 to 1865) and the oil shale deposit of Haute-Saône dated Toarcien.

== History ==
In 1308, Guyot II Granges ("Grammont Guyot II") built a castle here. He was in homage to Count Renaud de Montbéliard. The castle was besieged, taken, burned and partially demolished by the Swiss after the battle of Héricourt on November 13, 1474.

By letters patent of 10 March 1657, the land of Grammont was erected in the county in favor of Claude-François de Grammont, honorary knight in Parliament Dole (Jura). After taking Besançon in 1674, Louis XIV made him dismantle the castles of Franche-Comté and Grammont. From 1699, the castle of Villersexel, from the family of Rye, was the new place of residence of the family.

In 1841 Grammont had 422 inhabitants. At the end of the nineteenth century, Chalon-sur-Saône and Grammont were the two largest Eastern horse fairs, with a concentration on the second which went from 400 to 800 hp by year. The Belgian and Italian armies went there sometimes for horses to their artillery; they were led on foot to the station Villersexel by grooms of these armies. The Flemish merchants went there regularly. Then came the First World War, and infectious anemia equine decimated the herd. Mules replaced them; they even harnessed cows.

At Grammont, in the early twentieth century, fairs tools and seeds that correspond to periods of intense work (plowing and haymaking) disappeared. The horse fair, in hollow period, retained all its reason for being in late winter, hence the saying: "After the fair in Grammont is sown oats."

=== Annual fair ===
The annual fair of Grammont is held on the last Saturday of February. It has a tradition of 500 years and dates back to 1502. The fair features demonstrations of agricultural equipment and farm animals, musical performances and a market of regional produce.

=== Heraldry ===
Blazon of Grammont

The coat of arms of Grammont is an "Azure three queen busts complexion, and sandy hair and gold crown."

== Population ==
Historical population
Year	Pop.	±% p.a.
1968	96	—
1975	78	−2.92%
1982	84	+1.06%
1990	74	−1.57%
1999	71	−0.46%
2007	74	+0.52%
2012	65	−2.56%
2017	66	+0.31%
2023	67	+0.25%
Source: INSEE

In 1841 the population of Grammont peaked at 422, after which it declined, to 67 in 2023.

== See also ==
- Communes of the Haute-Saône department
