= James D. Slaton =

American soldier (1910/12–1961)

- Born: April 2, 1910 or 1912; Laurel, Mississippi, U.S.
- Died: February 25, 1961; Laurel, Mississippi, U.S.
- Burial place: Woodlawn Cemetery, Laurel, Mississippi
- Military career
- Allegiance: United States of America
- Branch: United States Army
- Rank: Corporal
- Units: 157th Infantry Regiment, 45th Infantry Division
- Conflicts: World War II
- Awards: Medal of Honor; Purple Heart; Order of the Patriotic War Second Class (Union of Soviet Socialist Republics)

James Daniel Slaton (April 2, 1910 or 1912 – February 25, 1961) was a United States Army soldier and a recipient of the United States military's highest decoration—the Medal of Honor—for his actions in World War II.

== Biography ==
Slaton joined the army from Gulfport, Mississippi, in June 1942, and by September 23, 1943, was serving as a corporal in the 157th Infantry Regiment, 45th Infantry Division. On that day, near Oliveto, Italy, he single-handedly destroyed three enemy machine gun nests. Lieutenant General Jacob L. Devers presented Slaton the Medal of Honor on June 7, 1944, in Algiers, Algeria. At the same ceremony, Soviet Ambassador Alexandr Ye. Bogomolov decorated Slaton with the Order of the Patriotic War Second Class.

Slaton left the army while still a corporal. He died in 1961 and was buried at Woodlawn Cemetery in his birth city of Laurel, Mississippi.

== Medal of Honor citation ==
Corporal Slaton's official Medal of Honor citation reads:

For conspicuous gallantry and intrepidity at the risk of life above and beyond the call of duty in action with the enemy in the vicinity of Oliveto, Italy, on September 23, 1943. Cpl. Slaton was lead scout of an infantry squad which had been committed to a flank to knock out enemy resistance which had succeeded in pinning 2 attacking platoons to the ground. Working ahead of his squad, Cpl. Slaton crept upon an enemy machinegun nest and, assaulting it with his bayonet, succeeded in killing the gunner. When his bayonet stuck, he detached it from the rifle and killed another gunner with rifle fire. At that time he was fired upon by a machinegun to his immediate left. Cpl. Slaton then moved over open ground under constant fire to within throwing distance, and on his second try scored a direct hit on the second enemy machinegun nest, killing 2 enemy gunners. At that time a third machinegun fired on him 100 yards to his front, and Cpl. Slaton killed both of these enemy gunners with rifle fire. As a result of Cpl. Slaton's heroic action in immobilizing 3 enemy machinegun nests with bayonet, grenade, and rifle fire, the 2 rifle platoons which were receiving heavy casualties from enemy fire were enabled to withdraw to covered positions and again take the initiative. Cpl. Slaton withdrew under mortar fire on order of his platoon leader at dusk that evening. The heroic actions of Cpl. Slaton were far above and beyond the call of duty and are worthy of emulation.

== Awards and Decorations ==

Badge	Combat Infantryman Badge		
1st row	Medal of Honor		
2nd row	Bronze Star Medal Retroactively Awarded, 1947	Purple Heart	Army Good Conduct Medal
3rd row	American Campaign Medal	European–African–Middle Eastern Campaign Medal with 2 Campaign stars	World War II Victory Medal

45th Infantry Division Insignia

Order of the Patriotic War

2nd Class
