= 168th Field Artillery Regiment =

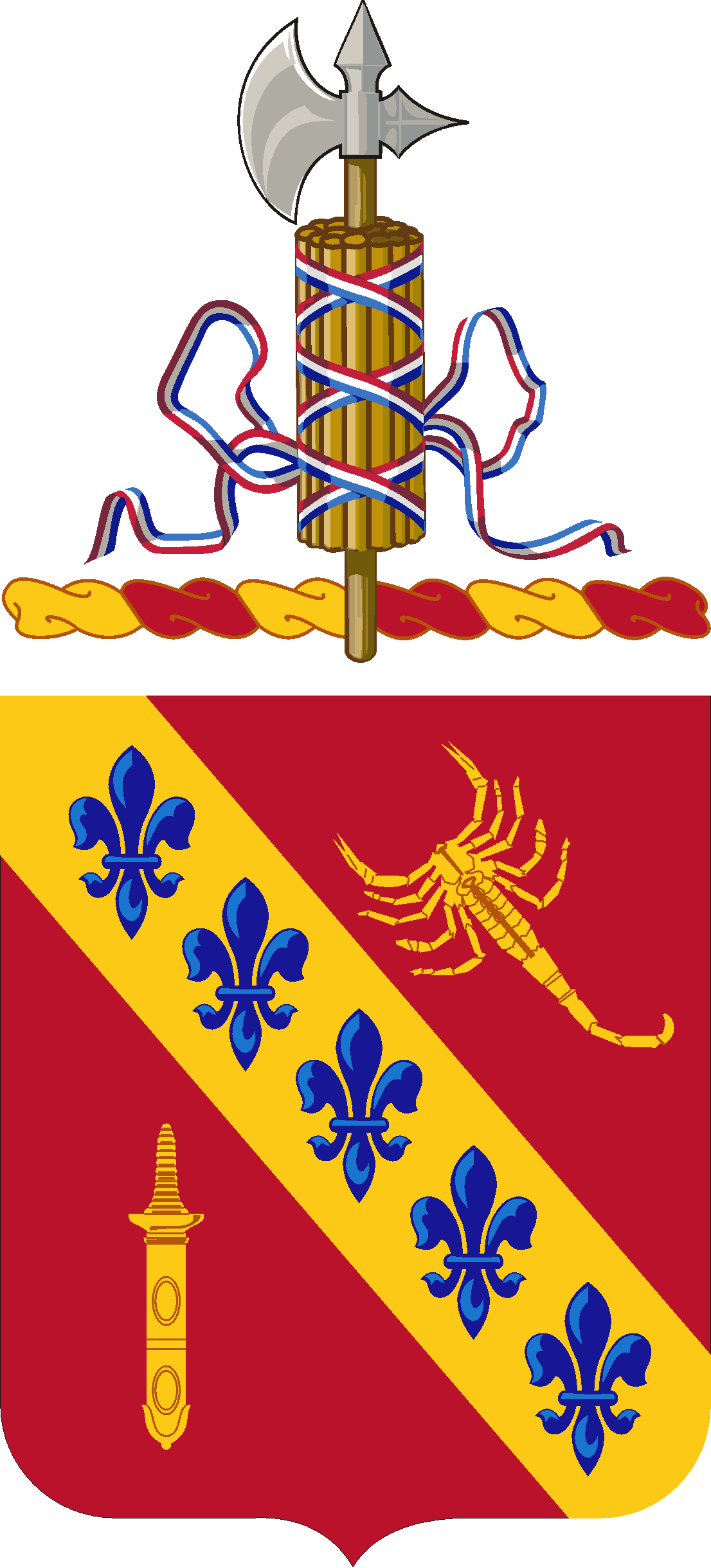
- Coat of arms
- Active: 1933–1943
- Country: United States
- Branch: Colorado Army National Guard
- Type: Field artillery
- Part of: 75th Field Artillery Brigade
- Motto(s): Accomplished With Energy

The 168th Field Artillery Regiment was a U.S. Army field artillery regiment of the Colorado National Guard that was active from 1933 to 1943.

== History ==
The regiment perpetuated the lineage of the 1st Separate Battalion, Field Artillery of the Colorado National Guard, originally organized on 30 September 1911 at Denver with Batteries A and B. The battalion was eliminated on 20 October 1914, with the two batteries becoming separate units. The battalion was reformed by the expansion of the Colorado field artillery units with Batteries A, B, and C on 5 July 1916. It was mustered into federal service at Golden between 4 July and 14 August that year for duty on the Mexican border, and was mustered out of federal service on 6 March 1917 at Fort D. A. Russell, Wyoming. The unit returned to federal service on 5 August 1917 during World War I, and was reorganized as the 1st Battalion, 148th Field Artillery of the 41st Division on 19 September 1917.

=== Interwar period ===
The 148th Field Artillery was demobilized at Fort D. A. Russell on 29 June 1919. The battalion was reorganized in the Colorado National Guard as the 1st Battalion, 158th Field Artillery, and federally recognized on 9 July 1923 with headquarters at Loveland. It was reorganized and redesignated 1 July 1926 as the 168th Field Artillery Battalion (Horse), becoming the divisional artillery battalion of the 24th Cavalry Division. The battalion was expanded into a regiment on 1 August 1933, with headquarters at Denver; the 1st Battalion was redesignated from the 168th Field Artillery Battalion (Horse), and the 2nd Battalion was converted from the 117th Separate Cavalry Squadron.

=== World War II ===
The regiment was relieved on 1 November 1940 from assignment to the 24th Cavalry Division, and its armament was changed from 75 mm guns to 155 mm howitzers. It was inducted into federal service 24 February 1941 at home stations.

The regiment was broken up on 1 March 1943, with the 1st Battalion redesignated as the 168th Field Artillery Battalion, and the 2nd Battalion redesignated as the 983rd Field Artillery Battalion. During World War II, the 168th Field Artillery Battalion was initially part of the 75th Field Artillery Brigade. It was inactivated on 17 January 1946 at Camp Stoneman, California.

=== Cold War ===
Postwar, the lineage of the 983rd Field Artillery Battalion was perpetuated by the 193rd Tank Battalion, which was activated on 10 May 1946. The 168th Field Artillery Battalion was reorganized and federally recognized on 6 January 1947 with headquarters at Denver. It was consolidated with the 157th Field Artillery Regiment (United States) on 1 February 1959.

=== Campaign streamers ===
- World War I
  - Champagne-Marne
  - Aisne-Marne
  - St. Mihiel
  - Meuse-Argonne
  - Champagne 1918
- World War II
  - New Guinea (With Arrowhead)
  - Luzon

=== Decorations ===
Philippine Presidential Unit Citation, Streamer embroidered 17 OCTOBER 1944 to 4 JULY 1945

=== Heraldry ===
The coat of arms was originally approved for the 168th Field Artillery Battalion on 13 November 1928. It was amended to correct the blazon of the shield on 19 January 1929. It was redesignated for the 168th Field Artillery Regiment on 9 January 1943. The insignia was redesignated for the 168th Field Artillery Battalion on 18 August 1943. It was rescinded/cancelled on 1 September 1961. The insignia was reinstated and redesignated for the 168th Regiment on 24 April 1997. It was amended to correct the blazon of the shield on 17 November 1997.
