= Colorado Army National Guard =

Component of the US Army and militia of the State of Colorado

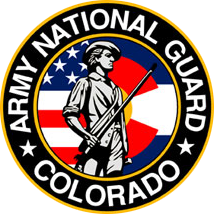
- Seal of the Colorado Army National Guard
- Founded: 1903
- Country: United States
- Allegiance: State of Colorado
- Branch: Army National Guard
- Type: ARNG Headquarters Command
- Part of: Colorado National Guard
- Garrison/HQ: Centennial, Colorado
- Website: https://co.ng.mil/Army/

Commanders
- Current commander: Brigadier General Laura Clellan
- Notable commanders: BG Felix L. Sparks

Insignia
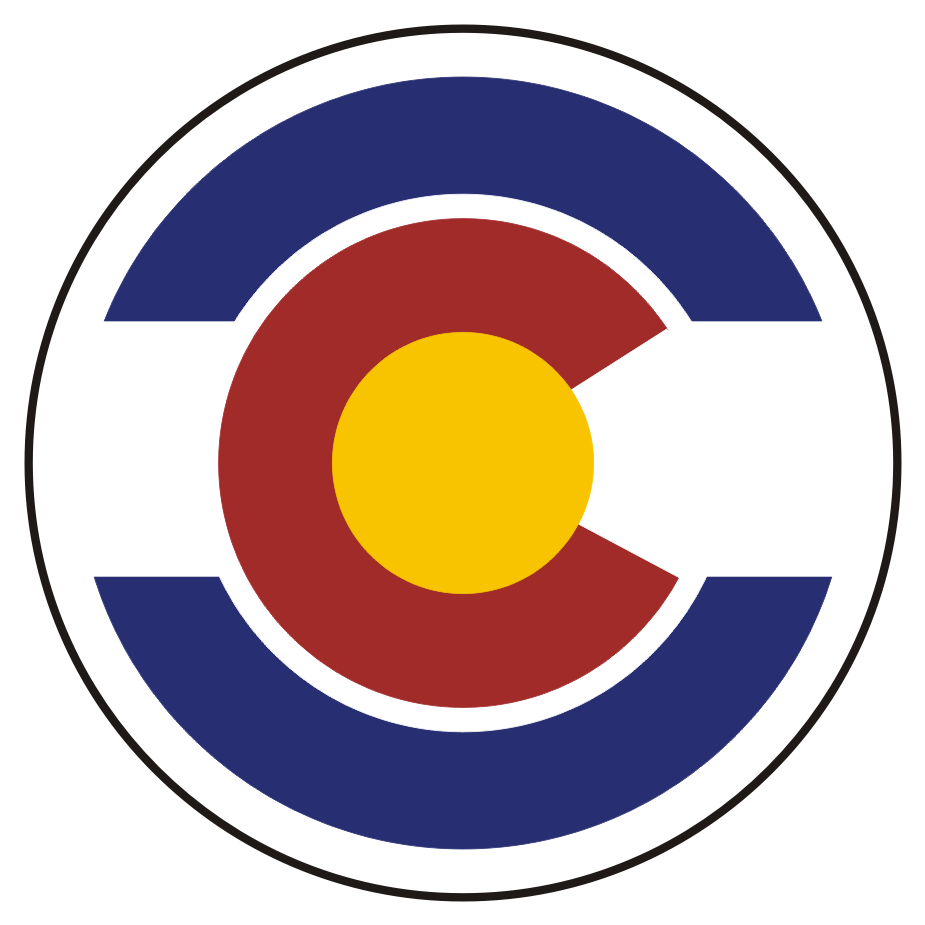
- Colorado ARNG STARC SSI

- Colorado National Guard Crest

The Colorado Army National Guard is a component of the United States Army, United States National Guard, and Colorado National Guard. Nationwide, the Army National Guard comprises approximately one half of the US Army's available combat forces and approximately one third of its support organization. National coordination of various state National Guard units is maintained through the National Guard Bureau.

Colorado Army National Guard units are trained and equipped as part of the United States Army. The same ranks and insignia are used and National Guardsmen are eligible to receive all United States military awards. The Colorado Guard also bestows a number of state awards for local services rendered in or to the State of Colorado.

As of 2026, the Colorado Army National Guard is composed of nearly 4,000 soldiers.

== Organization ==
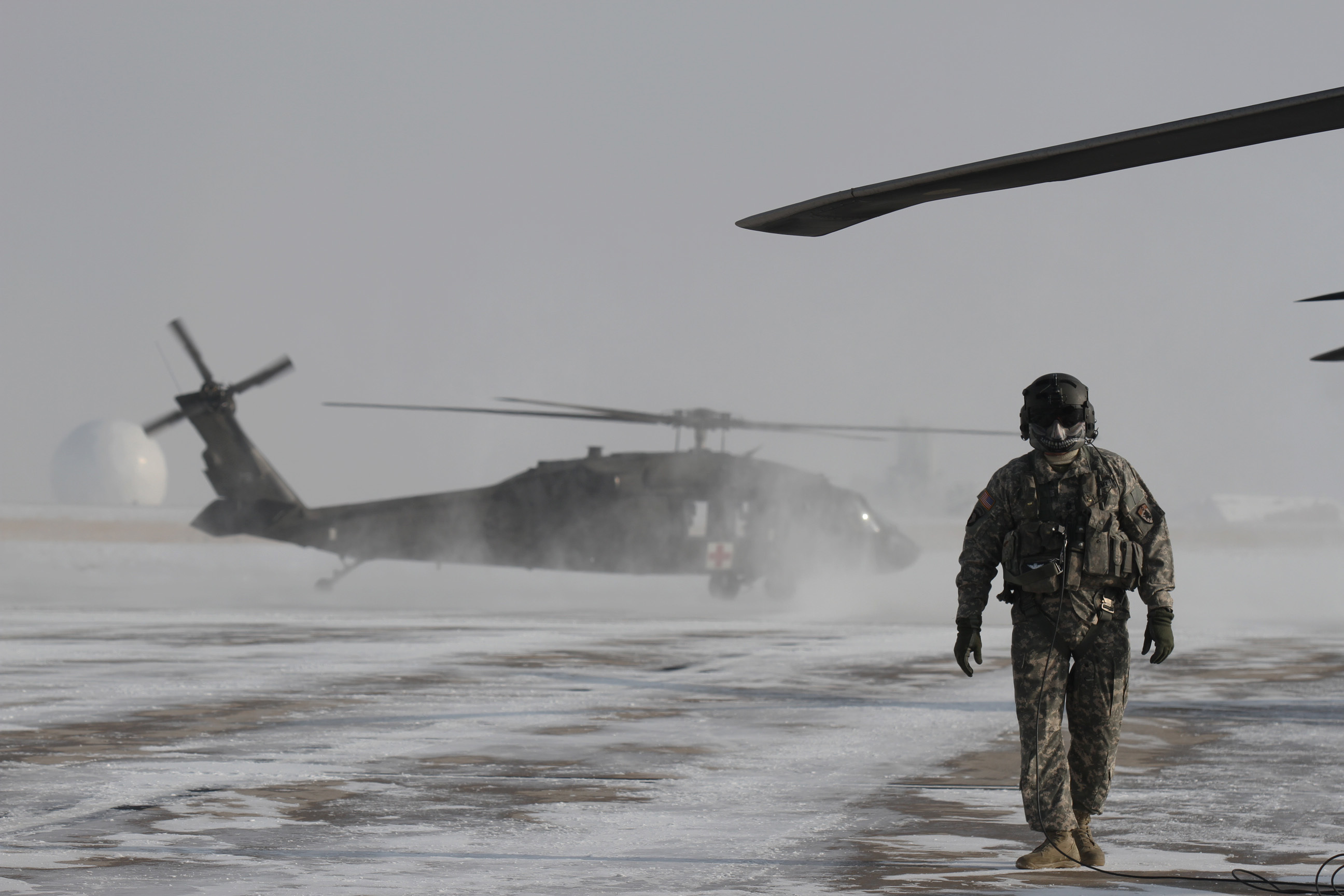
A Colorado Army National Guard crew chief conducts preflight checks on a UH-60 Black Hawk helicopter during a blizzard response exercise

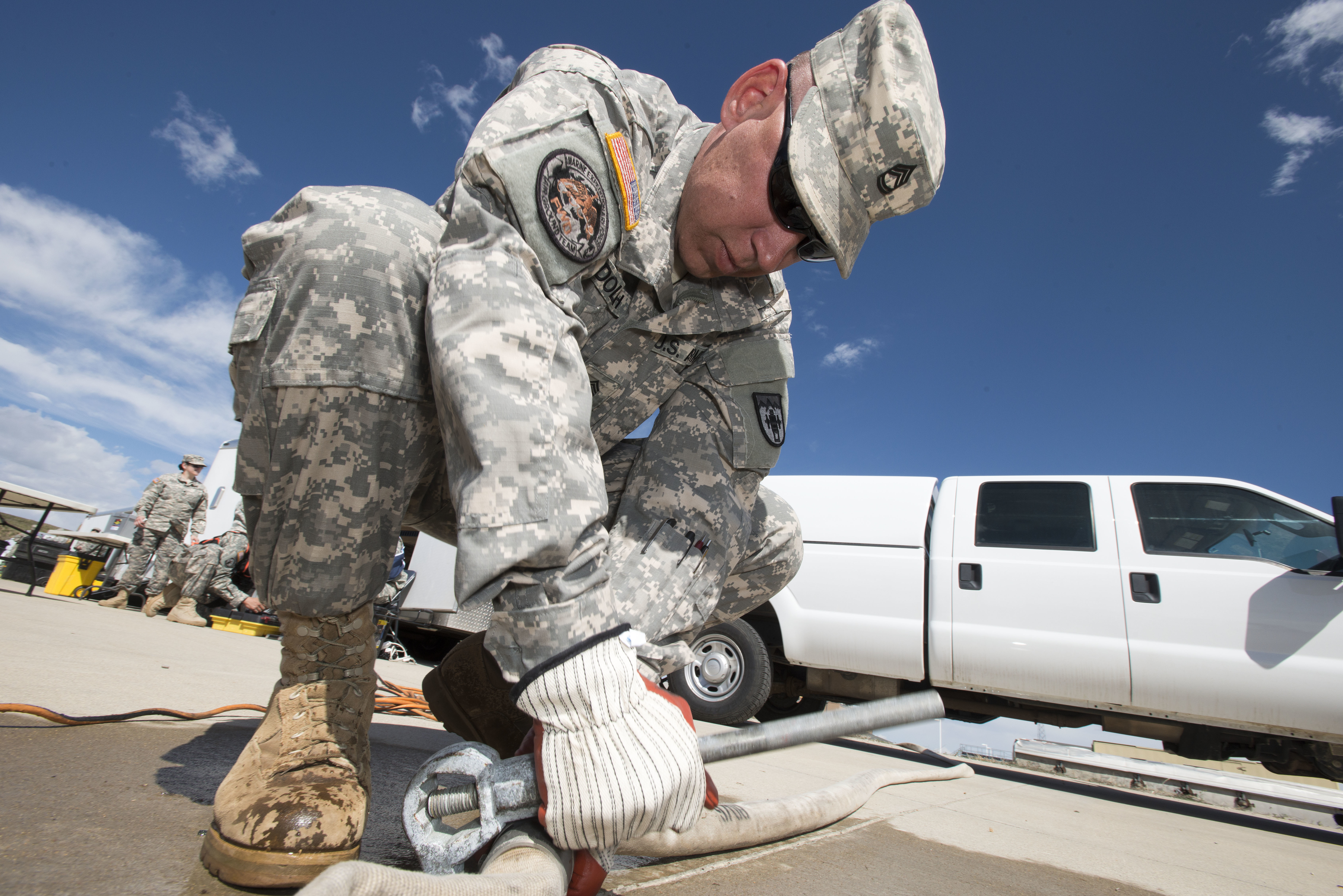
Sgt. Shawn Ludolph of the Colorado Army National Guard connecting fire hoses together during a training exercise

Colorado Army National Guardsmen assisting law enforcement in providing security for evacuated homes during a forest fire

As of January 2026 the Colorado Army National Guard consists of the following units:

- Joint Force Headquarters-Colorado, Army Element, in Centennial
  - Headquarters and Headquarters Detachment, Joint Force Headquarters-Colorado, Army Element, in Centennial
  - Colorado Recruiting & Retention Battalion, in Centennial
  - Colorado Medical Detachment, at Buckley Space Force Base
  - High-altitude ARNG Aviation Training Site (HAATS), in Gypsum
  - CBRNE Enhanced Response Force Package (CERF-P), at Buckley Space Force Base
  - 8th Civil Support Team (WMD), at Buckley Space Force Base
  - 891st Judge Advocate General Trial Defense Team, in Centennial
  - Special Operations Detachment-Korea (Airborne), at Buckley Space Force Base (supports Special Operations Command Korea)
  - Colorado Army National Guard NORTHCOM Mobilization Element, in Colorado Springs
  - Training Center, at Fort Carson
  - Maneuver Area Training Equipment Site #1, at Fort Carson
  - Army Aviation Support Facility #1, at Buckley Space Force Base
  - Combined Support Maintenance Shop #1, in Firestone
  - Field Maintenance Shop #1, in Firestone
  - Field Maintenance Shop #2, in Denver
  - Field Maintenance Shop #3, in Grand Junction
  - Field Maintenance Shop #5, at Fort Carson
  - Field Maintenance Shop #6, in Rocky Ford
  - Field Maintenance Shop #7, in Watkins
  - Field Maintenance Shop #9, in Aurora
  - 89th Troop Command, in Denver
    - Headquarters and Headquarters Company, 89th Troop Command, in Denver
    - 5th Battalion, 19th Special Forces Group (Airborne), in Watkins
      - Headquarters and Headquarters Detachment, 5th Battalion, 19th Special Forces Group (Airborne), in Watkins
      - Company A, 5th Battalion, 19th Special Forces Group (Airborne), at Camp Bullis (TX) — (Texas Army National Guard)
      - Company B, 5th Battalion, 19th Special Forces Group (Airborne), at Fort Carson
      - Company C, 5th Battalion, 19th Special Forces Group (Airborne), at Camp Bullis (TX) — (Texas Army National Guard)
      - Company D, 5th Battalion, 19th Special Forces Group (Airborne), in Watkins
      - Company E, 5th Battalion, 19th Special Forces Group (Airborne), in Watkins
      - Augmentation Company, 5th Battalion, 19th Special Forces Group (Airborne), in Watkins
    - 2nd Battalion (General Support Aviation), 135th Aviation Regiment, at Buckley Space Force Base
      - Headquarters and Headquarters Company, 2nd Battalion (General Support Aviation), 135th Aviation Regiment, at Buckley Space Force Base
        - Detachment 1, Headquarters and Headquarters Company, 2nd Battalion (General Support Aviation), 135th Aviation Regiment, at Central Nebraska Airport (NE) — (Nebraska Army National Guard)
        - Detachment 4, Headquarters and Headquarters Company, 2nd Battalion (General Support Aviation), 135th Aviation Regiment, at Sacramento Mather Airport (CA) — (California Army National Guard)
      - Company A (CAC), 2nd Battalion (General Support Aviation), 135th Aviation Regiment, at Gray Army Airfield (WA) (UH-60L Black Hawk) — (Army Reserve Aviation Command)
      - Company B (Heavy Lift), 2nd Battalion (General Support Aviation), 135th Aviation Regiment, at Central Nebraska Airport (NE) (CH-47F Chinook) — (Nebraska Army National Guard)
        - Detachment 1, Company B (Heavy Lift), 2nd Battalion (General Support Aviation), 135th Aviation Regiment, at Buckley Space Force Base
      - Company C (MEDEVAC), 2nd Battalion (General Support Aviation), 135th Aviation Regiment, at Sacramento Mather Airport (CA) (HH-60M Black Hawk) — (California Army National Guard)
        - Detachment 1, Company C (MEDEVAC), 2nd Battalion (General Support Aviation), 135th Aviation Regiment, at McGhee Tyson Airport (TN) — (Tennessee Army National Guard)
      - Company D (AVUM), 2nd Battalion (General Support Aviation), 135th Aviation Regiment, at Buckley Space Force Base
        - Detachment 1, Company D (AVUM), 2nd Battalion (General Support Aviation), 135th Aviation Regiment, at Central Nebraska Airport (NE) — (Nebraska Army National Guard)
        - Detachment 2, Company D (AVUM), 2nd Battalion (General Support Aviation), 135th Aviation Regiment, at Gray Army Airfield (WA) — (Army Reserve Aviation Command)
        - Detachment 3, Company D (AVUM), 2nd Battalion (General Support Aviation), 135th Aviation Regiment, at McGhee Tyson Airport (TN) — (Tennessee Army National Guard)
        - Detachment 4, Company D (AVUM), 2nd Battalion (General Support Aviation), 135th Aviation Regiment, at Sacramento Mather Airport (CA) — (California Army National Guard)
      - Company E (Forward Support), 2nd Battalion (General Support Aviation), 135th Aviation Regiment, at Buckley Space Force Base
        - Detachment 1, Company E (Forward Support), 2nd Battalion (General Support Aviation), 135th Aviation Regiment, at Central Nebraska Airport (NE) — (Nebraska Army National Guard)
        - Detachment 2, Company E (Forward Support), 2nd Battalion (General Support Aviation), 135th Aviation Regiment, at Gray Army Airfield (WA) — (Army Reserve Aviation Command)
        - Detachment 3, Company E (Forward Support), 2nd Battalion (General Support Aviation), 135th Aviation Regiment, at McGhee Tyson Airport (TN) — (Tennessee Army National Guard)
        - Detachment 4, Company E (Forward Support), 2nd Battalion (General Support Aviation), 135th Aviation Regiment, at Sacramento Mather Airport (CA) — (California Army National Guard)
      - Company F (ATS), 2nd Battalion (General Support Aviation), 135th Aviation Regiment, at Gray Army Airfield (WA) — (Army Reserve Aviation Command)
      - Company D (MEDEVAC), 3rd Battalion (Security & Support), 140th Aviation Regiment, at Buckley Space Force Base (UH-72A Lakota)
      - Detachment 1, Company C (MEDEVAC), 1st Battalion (General Support Aviation), 168th Aviation Regiment, at Buckley Space Force Base (HH-60M Black Hawk)
        - Detachment 4, Headquarters and Headquarters Company, 1st Battalion (General Support Aviation), 168th Aviation Regiment, at Buckley Space Force Base
        - Detachment 4, Company D (AVUM), 1st Battalion (General Support Aviation), 168th Aviation Regiment, at Buckley Space Force Base
        - Detachment 4, Company E (Forward Support), 1st Battalion (General Support Aviation), 168th Aviation Regiment, at Buckley Space Force Base
      - Company A (CAC), 2nd Battalion (General Support Aviation), 238th Aviation Regiment, at Buckley Space Force Base (UH-60L Black Hawk)
        - Detachment 4, Headquarters and Headquarters Company, 2nd Battalion (General Support Aviation), 238th Aviation Regiment, at Buckley Space Force Base
        - Detachment 1, Company D (AVUM), 2nd Battalion (General Support Aviation), 238th Aviation Regiment, at Buckley Space Force Base
        - Detachment 1, Company E (Forward Support), 2nd Battalion (General Support Aviation), 238th Aviation Regiment, at Buckley Space Force Base
      - Detachment 6, Company C, 2nd Battalion (Fixed Wing), 245th Aviation Regiment (Detachment 33, Operational Support Airlift Activity), at Buckley Space Force Base (C-26E Metroliner)
      - Detachment 1, 131st Aviation Support Company (AVIM), at Buckley Space Force Base
    - 1st Battalion, 157th Infantry Regiment (Mountain), in Colorado Springs (part of 86th Infantry Brigade Combat Team)
      - Headquarters and Headquarters Company, 1st Battalion, 157th Infantry Regiment, in Colorado Springs
      - Company A, 1st Battalion, 157th Infantry Regiment, in Colorado Springs
      - Company B, 1st Battalion, 157th Infantry Regiment, in Fort Lupton
      - Company C, 1st Battalion, 157th Infantry Regiment, in Grand Junction
      - Company D (Weapons), 1st Battalion, 157th Infantry Regiment, in Alamosa
        - Detachment 1, Company D (Weapons), 1st Battalion, 157th Infantry Regiment, in Colorado Springs
      - Company I (Forward Support), 186th Brigade Support Battalion, in Windsor
    - 193rd Military Police Battalion, in Denver
      - Headquarters and Headquarters Detachment, 193rd Military Police Battalion, in Denver
      - 101st Army Band, at Buckley Space Force Base
      - 104th Public Affairs Detachment, at Buckley Space Force Base
      - 220th Military Police Company (Combat Support), in Denver
      - 947th Engineer Company (Engineer Construction Company), in Montrose
  - 100th Missile Defense Brigade (Ground-Based Midcourse Defense), at Schriever Space Force Base (part of United States Army Space and Missile Defense Command)
    - Headquarters and Headquarters Battery, 100th Missile Defense Brigade (Ground-Based Midcourse Defense), at Schriever Space Force Base
      - Detachment 1, Headquarters and Headquarters Battery, 100th Missile Defense Brigade, (Ground-Based Midcourse Defense), at Vandenberg Space Force Base (CA) (California Army National Guard)
    - 117th Space Support Battalion, at Fort Carson (part of 1st Space Brigade)
      - Headquarters and Headquarters Company, 117th Space Support Battalion, at Fort Carson
      - 217th Space Company (Army Space Support Team), at Fort Carson
      - 1158th Space Company (Army Space Support Team), at Fort Carson
  - 169th Field Artillery Brigade, at Buckley Space Force Base
    - Headquarters and Headquarters Battery, 169th Field Artillery Brigade, at Buckley Space Force Base
      - Detachment 1, Headquarters and Headquarters Battery, 169th Field Artillery Brigade, in Colorado Springs
    - Company D (Military Intelligence), 572nd Brigade Engineer Battalion, in Denver (part of 86th Infantry Brigade Combat Team)
      - Detachment 1, Company D (Military Intelligence), 572nd Brigade Engineer Battalion, at Buckley Space Force Base (RQ-28A UAV)
      - Detachment 3, Company E (Forward Support), 186th Brigade Support Battalion, in Denver
    - 4th Infantry Division Main Command Post-Operational Detachment, at Fort Carson
    - Cyber Protection Team 174, in Centennial
    - 1st Battalion, 119th Field Artillery Regiment, in Lansing (MI) (M777A2) (Michigan Army National Guard)
    - 1st Battalion, 121st Field Artillery Regiment, in Milwaukee (WI) (M142 HIMARS) (Wisconsin Army National Guard)
    - 3rd Battalion, 157th Field Artillery Regiment, in Colorado Springs (M142 HIMARS)
      - Headquarters and Headquarters Battery, 3rd Battalion, 157th Field Artillery Regiment, in Colorado Springs
      - Battery A, 3rd Battalion, 157th Field Artillery Regiment, in Longmont
      - Battery B, 3rd Battalion, 157th Field Artillery Regiment, in Aurora
      - 188th Forward Support Company, in Pueblo
    - 147th Brigade Support Battalion, in Fort Collins
      - Headquarters Support Company, 147th Brigade Support Battalion, in Fort Collins
      - 140th Quartermaster Platoon (Field Feeding), at Fort Carson
      - 540th Signal Company, in Aurora
      - 928th Medical Company (Area Support), at Fort Carson
      - 3650th Ordnance Company (Support Maintenance), in Windsor
  - 168th Regiment, Regional Training Institute, at Fort Carson
    - Officer Candidate School
    - Warrant Officer Candidate School
    - Warrior Leader Course
    - Centennial Training Site

Aviation unit abbreviations: CAC — Command Aviation Company; MEDEVAC — Medical evacuation; AVUM — Aviation Unit Maintenance; AVIM — Aviation Intermediate Maintenance; ATS — Air Traffic Service

== Duties ==
National Guard units can be mobilized at any time by presidential order to supplement regular armed forces, and upon declaration of a state of emergency by the governor of the state in which they serve. Unlike Army Reserve members, National Guard members cannot be mobilized individually (except through voluntary transfers and Temporary Duty Assignments TDY), but only as part of their respective units. However, there has been a significant number of individual activations to support military operations (2001–?); the legality of this policy is a major issue within the National Guard.

=== Active Duty Callups ===
For much of the final decades of the twentieth century, National Guard personnel typically served "One weekend a month, two weeks a year", with a portion working for the Guard in a full-time capacity. The current forces formation plans of the US Army call for the typical National Guard unit (or National Guardsman) to serve one year of active duty for every three years of service. More specifically, current Department of Defense policy is that no Guardsman will be involuntarily activated for a total of more than 24 months (cumulative) in one six-year enlistment period (this policy is due to change 1 August 2007, the new policy states that soldiers will be given 24 months between deployments of no more than 24 months, individual states have differing policies).

== History ==
The Colorado Volunteer Militia, predecessor of the Colorado Army National Guard, was originally formed in 1860. The Militia Act of 1903 organized the various state militias into the present National Guard system.

The Colorado National Guard was involved in the suppression of multiple strikes, including the 1903–1904 Cripple Creek Strike while under the command of General John Chase. During the 1913–1914 United Mine Workers of America strike against the Rockefeller-owned Colorado Fuel and Iron company–an event known as the Colorado Coalfield War–the Guard was deployed in October 1913, again under the command of Chase. The Guard was involved in several violent encounters prior to the April 20, 1914 Ludlow Massacre, in which over a dozen women and children were killed when Guardsmen fired into a tent camp at Ludlow. Following the massacre, the Guard battled strikers throughout Southern Colorado during a 10-Day War.

Originally, the Colorado ARNG was a part of the Southern Department. This was later redesignated, in 1920, as Eighth Corps Area, with headquarters at Fort Sam Houston, Texas. In 1941, the Colorado ARNG came under the new Central Defense Command.

Approximately 300 Colorado ARNG soldiers deployed to Iraq with the 36th Combat Aviation Brigade in September 2006. On October 20, 2007 the Guard's provisional 193rd Space Battalion became a permanent-status unit, the 117th Space Battalion. On September 25, 2010, the 1st Battalion, 157th Infantry Regiment was reestablished. By 2018–19, it had become part of the Vermont-based 86th Infantry Brigade Combat Team, consisting of three National Guard mountain battalions.

The Colorado Army National Guard was deployed to Washington, D.C. to avoid another violent riot such as BLM Rioting and looting or similar to the one on January 6, when supporters of outgoing President Donald Trump stormed the U.S. Capitol where a Capitol police officer shot and killed a female protester. Three other individuals died due to "health complications" during the protest. In November 2023, two Colorado congressmen accused the National Guard Bureau of lack of proper payment to 13,000 members in their service.

=== Historic units ===
- 1st Colorado Infantry
- 137th Field Artillery Battalion (United States)
- 142nd Field Artillery Battalion (United States)
- 144th Field Artillery Battalion (United States)
- 168th Field Artillery Battalion (United States)
- 169th Field Artillery Battalion (Colorado)
- 183rd Field Artillery Battalion (Colorado)
- 193rd Tank Battalion (United states)
- 140th Signal Battalion (United States)
- 188th Antiaircraft Artillery Battalion (United States)
- 199th Engineer Battalion (United States)
- 928th Medical Company (Cortez, Colorado)

== See also ==
- Colorado State Defense Force
