= 142nd Field Artillery Battalion (United States) =

- Active: 1955-1959
- Country: United States
- Allegiance: Colorado
- Branch: Colorado Army National Guard
- Type: Field artillery
- Motto(s): Knock Them Out

The 142nd Field Artillery Battalion was a Field Artillery Branch battalion of the Colorado Army National Guard.

== Lineage ==
Organized 27 July 1885 in the Colorado National Guard as Company C, 1st Regiment Infantry (Greeley Guards).

Mustered out 6 October 1888 at Greeley, Colorado

Reorganized 23 November 1895 at Greeley as Company D. 1st infantry Regiment.

Mustered into Federal service 8 May 1898 at Camp Alva Adams, Denver, as Company D. 1st volunteer Infantry Regiment. (Home Guard Company D. 1st Infantry Regiment organized February 1899 at Greely)

Mustered out of Federal service 8 September 1899 at San Francisco, California and consolidated with Home Guard company D. 1st Infantry Regiment Colorado National guard.

Disbanded 27 May 1915 at Greeley

Reorganized 16 September 1921 at Greeley as Headquarters Company, 177th Infantry Regiment.

Redesignated 16 November 1921 as Headquarters Company 157th Infantry Regiment

Redesignated Headquarters Company (less antitank platoon), 157th Infantry Regiment and assigned to the 45th Infantry Division 1 September 1939

Reorganized and redesignated 1 November 1939 as Company B. 157th Infantry Regiment inducted into Federal service 16 September 1940 at Greeley

Inactivated 22 November 1945 at Camp Bowie, Texas

Relieved from the 45th division and redesignated Headquarters Company 2nd Battalion, 157th Infantry Regiment 10 may 1946.

Converted, reorganized and redesignated Headquarters and Headquarters Battery 142nd Field Artillery Battalion, 1 August 1955; concurrently remainder of battalion organized from existing units as follows.

- Company K. 157th Infantry Regiment at Fort Morgan redesignated Battery A.
- Company L. 157th Infantry Regiment at Sterling redesignated Battery B.
- Company C. 157th Infantry Regiment at Brush redesignated Battery C.
- Company E. 157th Infantry Regiment at Greeley redesignated Service Battery.

Battalion broken up 1 February 1959 and elements reorganized or consolidated as follows.

- Headquarters and Headquarters Battery and Service Battery at Greeley consolidated, reorganized and redesignated Company A. 140th Signal Battalion
- Battery A. at Fort Morgan redesignated Service Battery 1st Howitzer Battalion 157th Field Artillery
- Batteries B, and C, at Sterling consolidated, reorganized and redesignated Battery B. 1st howitzer Battalion 157th Field Artillery

== Campaign streamers ==
War with Spain

- Manila

Philippine Insurrection

- Manila
- Luzon 1899

World War II

- Sicily (with Arrowhead)
- Naples-Foggia (with Arrowhead)
- Anzio
- Rome Arno
- Southern France (with Arrowhead)
- Rhineland
- Ardennes-alsace
- Central Europe

== Decorations ==
French Croix de Guerre with Palm, World War II, streamer embroidered Italy

== Coat of arms ==
- Shield

Per fess embattled or and gules, in chief two wigwams of the second, garnished of the first and in base a sea lion brandishing a sword in dexter paw of the last

- Crest

That for the regiments and separate battalions of the Colorado National guard

- Background

The shield is that of the coat of arms of the 157th Infantry with the colors reversed to indicate descent from that regiment. The colors scarlet and yellow are used for artillery. These colors are also the Spanish colors and with embattled partition line and the Philippine sea lion refer to the walled city of Manila in the Philippine Islands. The wigwams refer to Indian service in the frontier days.
