= 183rd Field Artillery Battalion (United States) =

183rd Field Artillery Battalion (1955-59)
- Active: 1955–1959
- Country: United States
- Branch: Colorado Army National Guard
- Type: Combat arms
- Nicknames: King of Battle; Red Leg
- Patron: Saint Barbara
- Motto: RIGHT AND READY
- Branch color: Scarlet

The 183rd Field Artillery Battalion was a battalion of the Field Artillery Branch (United States) of the United States Army. From 1955 to 1959 it formed part of the Colorado Army National Guard.

== History ==
There were two units issued this number this is the Colorado unit. The Idaho Unit predates the Colorado unit.

== Lineage ==
Constituted 10 May 1946 as Company C, 199th Engineer Combat Battalion and allotted to the Colorado National Guard

- Organized and Federally recognized 12 March 1948 at La Junta.
- Converted and redesignated 15 December 1949 as Company M, 157th Infantry

Converted and redesignated 1 August 1955 as Headquarters and Headquarters Battery, 183rd Field Artillery Battalion, concurrently, remainder of battalion organized from existing units as follows

- 192nd Engineer Company at Trinidad redesignated as Battery A.
- Tank Company 157th Infantry at Las Animas redesignated as Battery C.
- Headquarters and Headquarters Company 3rd battalion 157th Infantry at Lamar redesignated Service Battery

Consolidated with 157th Field Artillery Regiment (United States) 1 February 1959

== Coat of arms ==
- Shield

Per fess embattled Gules and Or in chief two wigwams of the second garnished of the first and in base a sea lion brandishing a sword in dexter paw of the last. all within a bordure counterchanged

- Crest

That for the regiments and separate battalions of the Colorado Army National Guard

- Background

The coat of arms is that of the 157th Infantry within a border to indicate descent from that regiment.
