= 157th Field Artillery Regiment =

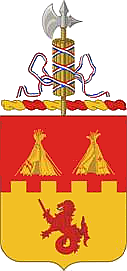
- Coat of arms
- Active: 1917-present
- Country: United States
- Branch: United States Army
- Type: Field Artillery (Parent Regiment under United States Army Regimental System)
- Part of: 169th Field Artillery Brigade
- Home station: Colorado Springs
- Nickname: First Colorado (special designation)
- Motto: "Eager for duty"
- March: Hot Time in the Old Town Tonight
- Equipment: M142 HIMARS
- Decorations: Meritorious Unit Commendation

Commanders
- Notable commanders: John H. Church

Insignia
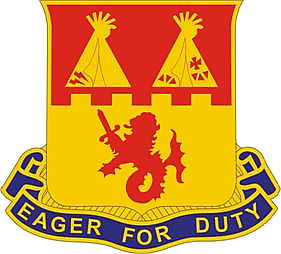
- Distinctive unit insignia

The 157th Field Artillery Regiment (First Colorado) is a United States Army Regimental System field artillery parent regiment of the United States Army National Guard, represented in the Colorado Army National Guard by the 3rd Battalion, 157th Field Artillery Regiment, part of the 169th Field Artillery Brigade at Colorado Springs.

The unit was first constituted in 1879 as the 1st Infantry Battalion. In 1917 during World War I the unit was mustered into federal service as the 157th Infantry Regiment, as part of the 40th Division.

After World War I, the unit was moved under the 45th Division where it stayed until after World War II. In 1950 it was relieved from assignment from the 45th Division and after the Korean War, reorganized as an artillery regiment. During the 1960s, 1970s and 1980s, the 1st and 2nd Battalions of the regiment operated the M110 howitzer. The retirement of the M110 system left many National Guard units without a mission. In 2002, the battalions transitioned to the M270 Multiple Launch Rocket System, and later in 2009 to the M142 High Mobility Artillery Rocket System (HIMARS).

The 1st and 2nd Battalions (MLRS), 157th Field Artillery Regiment were disbanded in 2006 during the U.S. Army's restructuring from divisional organizations to the modular Brigade Combat Team model. Members of the two battalions were reorganized to form the 3rd Battalion (HIMARS), 157th Field Artillery (3-157 FA), part of the 169th Field Artillery Brigade of the Colorado Army National Guard.

== Lineage of 157th Field Artillery Regiment ==
=== 19th century ===
The regiment was originally constituted on 8 February 1879 in the Colorado National Guard as the 1st Infantry Battalion. It was organized on 29 December 1881, with headquarters in Denver. It was expanded and redesignated on 22 March 1883 as the 1st Regiment, Infantry, and was reduced and redesignated on 2 April 1889 as the 1st Infantry Battalion. On 15 April 1893, it was expanded and redesignated as the 1st Infantry Regiment, Colorado National Guard. The regiment was consolidated with the 2nd Infantry Regiment (organized 27 May 1887) and mustered into federal service from 1–8 May 1898 at Denver as the 1st Colorado Volunteer Infantry, and was mustered out of federal service on 8 September 1899 at San Francisco, California, reverting to state status as the 1st Infantry Regiment.

=== 20th century ===
The 1st Colorado was expanded in 1900 as the 1st and 2nd Infantry. The 1st and 2nd Infantry were consolidated on 5 June 1916 and designated as the 1st Infantry.

==== Mexican Expedition and World War I ====
Two battalions were mustered into federal service from 26 June to 29 July 1916 for service on the Mexican border as the 1st and 2nd Separate Battalions, Colorado Infantry. The entire regiment was drafted into Federal service for World War I on 5 August 1917, being reorganized and redesignated on 24 September 1917 as the 157th Infantry Regiment, an element of the 40th Division. On 13 October 1917, the 1st Colorado Cavalry (organized in 1880) was consolidated with the 157th Infantry.

==== Interwar period ====
The 157th was attached to the 45th Infantry Division "Thunderbirds" throughout WWII

The 157th Infantry arrived at the port of New York on 11 April 1919 on the troopship USS Julia Luckenbach and was demobilized on 29 April 1919 at Fort D.A. Russell, Wyoming. The regiment was reorganized as the 177th Infantry on 28 February 1921, with headquarters organized on 26 October 1921 and federally recognized at Denver, Colorado, and assigned to the newly-constituted 45th Division. On 16 November 1921, per the National Defense Act of 1920, the regiment reassumed its World War I designation of the 157th Infantry. The regiment, or elements thereof, was called up to perform the following state duties: flood relief at Pueblo, Colorado, in June 1921; 1st Battalion performed riot control during a coal miners’ strike at Pueblo in July 1922; regimental headquarters and three companies performed riot control during a coal miners’ strike at the Columbine Mine, near Boulder, Colorado, from 21 November 1927–6 April 1928; regiment, less the 2nd Battalion, performed duties dubbed the "Great Grasshopper War" in connection with grasshopper infestations in eastern Colorado, from 28 June–26 August 1937; performed riot control during a coal miners’ strike at the Green Mountain Mine, from 3–31 August 1939. The regiment conducted annual summer training most years at Camp George West, near Colorado Springs, from 1921–39, and in at least two years (1932–33), the regiment also trained some 17 company-grade infantry officers of the 103rd Division at Camp George West. The 157th Infantry was inducted into active federal service on 16 September 1940 and moved to Fort Sill, near Lawton, Oklahoma, where it arrived on 26 September 1940. It was subsequently transferred on 28 February 1941 to Camp Barkeley, near, Abilene, Texas. The regiment was inactivated on 3 December 1945 at Camp Bowie.

==== Cold War ====
The 157th Infantry was relieved 10 May 1946 from assignment to the 45th infantry Division. It was reorganized and federally recognized 8 January 1947 with headquarters at Buckley Field; the location of headquarters was changed 3 September 1947 to Denver. The regiment was broken up on 1 August 1955, and elements were converted and redesignated as follows;

- Headquarters and the 1st Battalion as the 144th Field Artillery Battalion.
- Headquarters Company as Headquarters and Headquarters Battery, 169th Field Artillery Group;
- Headquarters and Headquarters Company, 2nd Battalion, and Companies E, K, and L as Headquarters and Headquarters Battery, Service Battery, and Batteries A and B, 142nd Field Artillery Battalion;
- Companies F and H as Batteries A and B, 137th Field Artillery Battalion;
- Company G as Battery B, 168th Field Artillery Battalion;
- Headquarters and Headquarters Company 3rd Battalion, Company M, Medical Company, and Tank Company as Service Battery, Headquarters and Headquarters Battery, and Batteries C and B, 183rd Field Artillery Battalion;
- Company I and Service Company as Service Battery and Battery B, 169th Field Artillery Battalion;
- Heavy Mortar Company as Battery A, 188th Antiaircraft Artillery Battalion

The 144th Field Artillery Battalion was consolidated on 1 February 1959 with the 168th Field Artillery Battalion, the 183rd Field Artillery Battalion, and the 188th Antiaircraft Artillery Battalion, and the consolidated unit was reorganized and redesignated as the 157th Artillery, a parent Regiment under the U.S. Army Combat Arms Regimental System, to consist of the 1st, 2nd, 3rd, and 4th Howitzer Battalions. Reorganized 1 January 1968 to consist of the 1st and 2nd Battalions. Redesignated 1 March 1972 as the 157th Field Artillery. Withdrawn 1 June 1989 from the Combat Arms Regimental System and reorganized under the United States Army Regimental System.

== Distinctive unit insignia ==
The distinctive unit insignia (DUI) was originally approved for the 157th Infantry Regiment on 12 June 1924. It was subsequently redesignated for the 144th Field Artillery Battalion of the Colorado National Guard on 1 May 1956. The insignia was redesignated for the 157th Artillery Regiment of the Colorado National Guard on 23 March 1961 and then redesignated for the 157th Field Artillery Regiment, Colorado Army National Guard on 28 August 1972.

The DUI is a gold color metal and enamel device 1 1/8 inches (2.9 cm) in height overall consisting of a shield blazoned: Per fess embattled Gules and Or in chief two wigwams of the second garnished of the first and in base a sea horse brandishing a sword in dexter paw of the last. Attached below and to the sides of the shield a Blue scroll inscribed "EAGER FOR DUTY" in Gold letters.

The shield is scarlet and yellow which are the Spanish colors; the parting line embattled in recollection of fortifications. The sea horse of the Philippines recalls that the fortification was the walled city of Manila. The two wigwams recall the Indian service in the frontier days.

== Campaign participation credit ==
- War with Spain:
  - Manila
- Philippine Insurrection:
  - Manila
  - Luzon
- World War I:
  - Champagne 1918
  - Champagne-Marne
  - Saint-Mihiel
  - Meuse-Argonne
- World War II:
  - Sicily (with arrowhead)
  - Naples-Foggia (with arrowhead)
  - Anzio
  - Rome-Arno
  - Southern France (with arrowhead)
  - Rhineland
  - Ardennes-Alsace
  - Central Europe
  - New Guinea
  - Luzon

Headquarters Battery, 2nd Battalion (Colorado Springs) additionally entitled to:

- World War II:
  - Central Pacific
  - Leyte
  - Southern Philippines

Battery C, 2nd Battalion (Pueblo) additionally entitled to:

- World War II:
  - Leyte
  - Southern Philippines

== Decorations ==
- Meritorious Unit Commendation (Army), Streamer embroidered IRAQ 2009-2010
- French Croix de Guerre avec Palme, World War II, Streamer embroidered ITALY (earned as the 157th Infantry)
- Philippine Presidential Unit Citation, Streamer embroidered 17 OCTOBER 1944 TO 4 JULY 1945 (earned as the 168th Field Artillery Battalion)
- Battery B (Aurora), 3d Battalion, additionally entitled to:
  - Presidential Unit Citation (Army), Streamer embroidered ANZIO (earned as Company H, 157th Infantry)
  - Meritorious Unit Commendation (Army), Streamer embroidered SOUTHWEST ASIA OCT 2016 - JUL 2017
- Headquarters Battery 2nd Bn. additionally entitled to;
  - WWII-AP
- Headquarters Battery, 1st Bn. and Service Battery 1st Bn. entitled to:
  - Presidential Unit Citation (Army) Streamer embroidered ANZIO

== Medal of Honor recipients ==
- Edward G. Wilkin
- James D. Slaton
- Van T. Barfoot
- Almond E. Fisher

== In popular culture ==
The 2012 historical novel, The Liberator: One World War II Soldier’s 500-Day Odyssey, by Alex Kershaw, focuses on 157th Infantry Regiment officer Felix L. Sparks and the men he led, all members of the "Thunderbirds". The novel was adapted into a four part miniseries, The Liberator, released on Netflix in 2020.
