= Canopy piloting =

Parachuting discipline

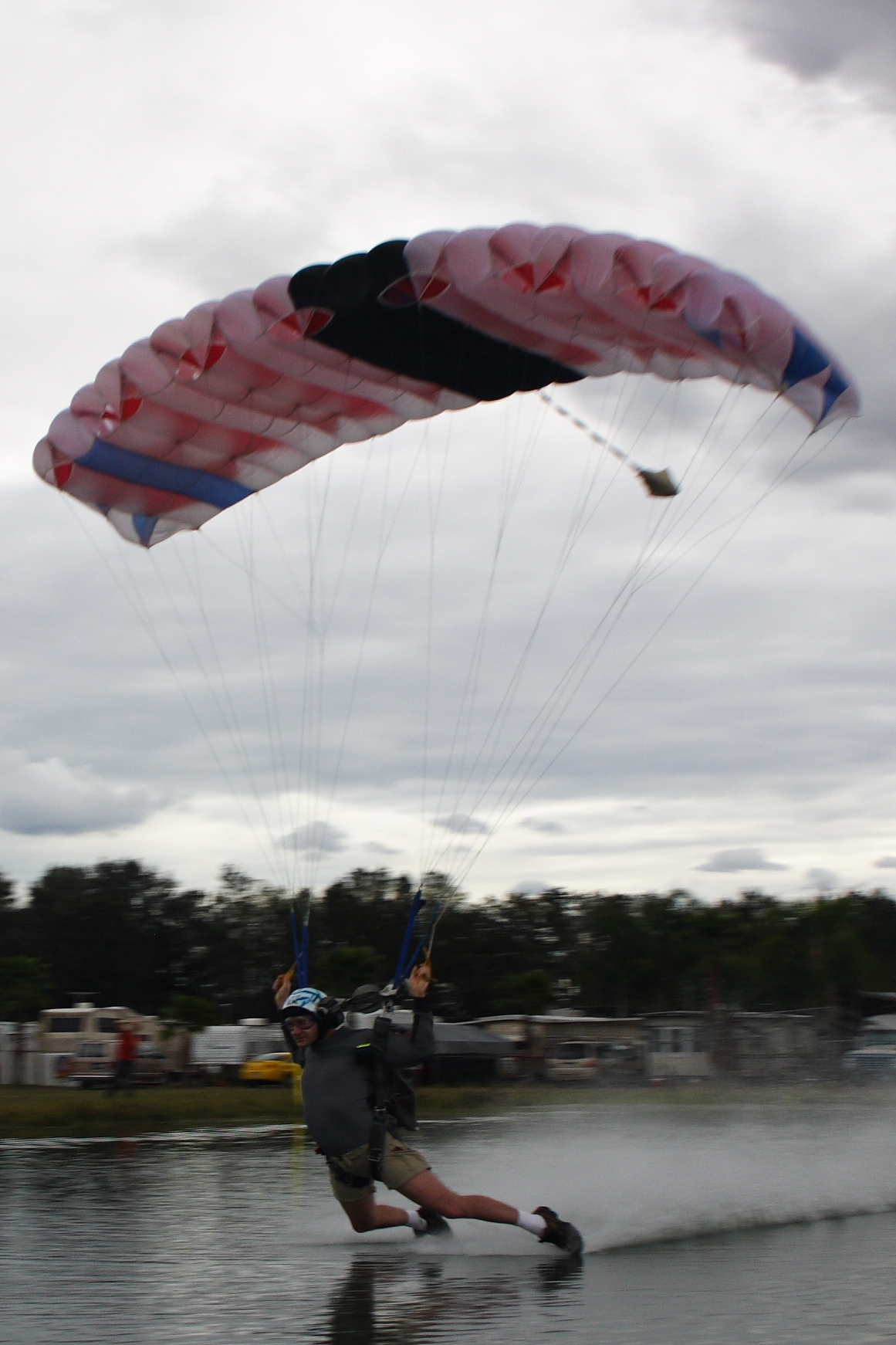

Canopy piloting Canopy Piloting is a high speed parachuting discipline involving small and very agile parachutes.

Swooping is a high speed canopy maneuver.

== Records ==
World records that have been recorded and verified include:

G-1-f1 : Distance - General - Canopy Piloting Records : 151.95m
Date of : 15 June 2012
Parachutist(s): Nick Batsch (USA)
Canopy type: Daedalus JPX Petra
Course/place: Rockmart, GA (USA)

G-1-f2 : Speed over a 70m course - General - Canopy Piloting Records : 2.404 sec
Date of : 15 June 2012
Parachutist(s): Greg Windmiller (USA)
Canopy type: PD Velocity
Course/place: Rockmart, GA (USA)

Greg Windmiller (A member of the US army parachuting "Golden Knights") was also documented in the Guinness Book of World Records as the fastest man alive under a parachute and was the first person in competition to document a speed of under 2 seconds.

== Contests ==
Pro Swooping Tour Professional competition courses mark the entry gates with wind blades stretching five feet tall, where some part of the pilot's body must break the imaginary line across the top of the entry gate pair, often only 30 feet apart. These types of landings are inherently more dangerous than normal landings. For competitors' safety, this is usually done over a "swoop pond", a shallow, artificial pond around three feet deep, that can be narrow and long.

The goal of the canopy piloting competition is to negotiate courses that challenge different performance characteristics of both canopy flight and pilot skill. Speed, distance and accuracy are just three of the basic courses used at most competitions. On a freestyle course, competitors drag through a large body of water, or touch the surface with different body parts and in different positions while maintaining nearly constant contact with the water. Gaining popularity both with competitors and spectators, freestyle puts the canopy pilot in contact with water at high speeds, increasing the risk of a violent impact.

Ground-launching and speed-flying are other forms of canopy piloting. These disciplines differ from swooping in that the canopy pilot flies his canopy in close proximity to the ground, descending a mountainside or other gradient or, in certain conditions, hovering several meters above the ground, much like a paragliding pilot. These types of descents are longer in duration.

== See also ==
- Skydiving
- Drop zone
