= Task Force 74 =

US Navy task force deployed during the 1971 India–Pakistan War

Task Force 74 was a naval task force that has existed twice. The first Task Force 74 was a mixed Allied force of Royal Navy, Royal Australian Navy, and United States Navy ships which operated against Japanese forces from 1943 to 1945 during the Pacific campaign. The second Task Force 74 was assembled from the U.S. Navy's Seventh Fleet that was deployed to the Bay of Bengal by the Nixon administration in December 1971 during the Indo-Pakistani War. The fleet was sent to intimidate Indian forces at the height of the conflict. The Soviet Union, which was actively backing Indian actions both politically and militarily during the war responded by deploying two groups of cruisers and destroyers as well as a submarine armed with nuclear warheads in response to the American military presence in the area. From 18 December 1971 to 7 January 1972, the Soviet Navy trailed the American fleet throughout the Indian Ocean. The task force number is now used by the U.S. Seventh Fleet's submarine force.

== World War II ==
On 15 March 1943, Task Force 44, an Australia–United States task force made up of cruisers and destroyers operating in the South West Pacific Area, was redesignated as Task Force 74. In the Battle of Hollandia between American and Japanese forces in April–June 1944, the task force was made up of HMAS Shropshire and up to four destroyers, including HMAS Arunta.

Following a preliminary bombardment, the battle for Cebu City began on 26 March 1945, when the Allies launched Operation Victor II. Staging out of Leyte, where they had conducted rehearsal landings two days earlier, a large flotilla of cruisers and destroyers from the United States Seventh Fleet's Task Force 74 escorted the Cebu Attack Group to the island. Under the leadership of Major-General William H. Arnold, the forces assigned to the operation consisted of the Americal Division's 132nd and 182nd Infantry Regiments, totalling about 5,000 men, and were landed at Talisay Beach on Cebu Island, 6.4 kilometres (4 mi) southwest of Cebu City. The 182nd came ashore southwest of the city, while the 132nd landed at a wide gravel beach to the northeast opposite a palm grove. While meeting no Japanese opposition, American forces nevertheless suffered heavy casualties from land mines and booby traps as they crossed the beach.

== Cold War period ==
The Indian Ocean had, in the post-colonial cold-war situation in the 1960s, a strong British Royal Navy presence which projected Western interests in the region, and carried out security operations, as well as a deterrence against Soviet overtures in this area. The US navy's role at this time was confined to a limited presence in Bahrain.

=== Naval deterrence in the Indian Ocean ===
By the mid-1960s, with a failing economy, Britain began to roll back her role in the region. In a situation of political instability in the region, the Soviet Union also began a strong diplomatic initiative in the littoral states and initiated limited naval deployments, prompting fears that withdrawal of a western peacekeeping role would allow the Soviet Navy to fulfil its aspirations in the region, threatening western economic and military interests in the region and leading to loss of this area from the western sphere of influence. This lent a strong voice to the proponents of a strong US naval presence in the Indian Ocean, among them Elmo Zumwalt, as a diplomatic as well military deterrence against Soviet moves. US security interests in the Indian Ocean were, however, initially restricted to the countries of Ethiopia, Iran and Saudi Arabia.

=== Superpowers in the Indian subcontinent ===
Both the United States and the Soviet Union had attempted to establish strong links with India following the Sino-Indian war of 1962, much to the disturbance of Pakistan especially since they were already in a military alliance with the United States. India had obtained substantial military and economic assistance from the United States towards the end of the conflict, but remained committed to the Non-Aligned Movement. Following the end of the conflict, Soviet offers of MiG fighter aircraft, as well as offers for transfer of technology and production facilities for military hardware confirmed India's preference for Moscow in terms of long-term security collaboration. In 1963, the US Navy deployed its first Carrier group in the Indian Ocean close to the Indian coast. However, since this was within a year of the end of the Sino-Indian conflict, where the US and Britain had offered substantial help to India, this was not interpreted as a diplomatic pressure or a show-of-force, and was in all probability training exercises to familiarise the navy with the Indian Ocean area. India had also at this time allowed the US to install intelligence gathering devices in the Himalayan peaks close to China, on the conditions of intelligence-sharing.

By the end of the 1960s, the Vietnam War became the focus for the United States, with the Indian subcontinent receiving much less attention. Peace in the region was assumed by the US to be the responsibility of the regional powers of India and China.

=== East Pakistan / Bangladesh crisis ===
The Bangladesh Liberation War brought the Indian subcontinent back into the focus of the cold-war confrontations. The crisis had its roots in the economic and social disparities between the Eastern and Western wings of Pakistan and a dominance of the Eastern wing by the west since the creation of the nascent state in 1947 that increasingly divided the two wings through the 1960s During March 1971 Pakistan Army aided and advised by Bhutto and the army stopped political negotiation with East Pakistan's Sheikh Mujib, whose party Awami League won a landslide victory and majority seats in the Pakistan Parliament, and started a massive crackdown on the civilians and paramilitary police of the Eastern wing. By the last quarter of 1971, Pakistan was in a state of civil war, its Eastern wing locked in a ferocious battle for independence from the Western wing. The crisis precipitated in March 1971 when rising political discontent and cultural nationalism in East Pakistan was met by Yahya Khan launching Operation Searchlight, which resulted in the 1971 Bangladesh genocide. The majority of East Pakistan's political leadership, including Mujibur Rahman, were arrested and, following brief confrontations and bloody battles between Bengali nationalists and some 40,000 strong Pakistani military, political order was forcibly and temporarily reimposed by the end of April amidst strong protests from India, the Soviet Union and other countries against the atrocities against the Bengali civilian population. The Pakistani army aided by paramilitaries from West Pakistan and local non-Bengali and some Islamic minded-Bengali political parties were killing large numbers of East Pakistanis. Depending on the source, the total death toll of the predominantly Bengali East Pakistanis during these events were either up to 500,000 people (according to independent researchers) or 3 million people (according to the government of Bangladesh). The massive and disproportionate crackdown by Pakistan Army forces engendered a sea of refugees (estimated at the time to be about 10 million, 13% of the entire East Pakistani population) who came flooding to the eastern provinces of India. Facing a mounting humanitarian crisis, India started actively aiding and re-organising what was by this time already the nucleus of the Mukti Bahini.

In the months before the war, both Pakistan and India attempted to shore up diplomatic support. On 9 August 1971, India signed a twenty-year co-operation treaty with the Soviet Union, followed by a six-nation tour of Europe and USA by Indira Gandhi in October. This tour was intended to demonstrate India's professed neutrality despite the Indo-Soviet treaty, as well as to highlight the refugee problem faced by India. Pakistan came under increasing criticism from India, the Soviet Union, Japan, and Europe as the plight of the refugees and their impact on the Indian economy were highlighted by Indira Gandhi in the UN and on a number of global tours. However, the United States and China showed little interest in the crisis and actively opposed aid, intervention or support to the Mukti Bahini. Zulfikar Ali Bhutto at this time led a high level delegation to Beijing to obtain commitment from China of support in case of Indian intervention while Pakistan pressed at the UN for an International Peacekeeping Force for the India-East Pakistan border. The Pakistani efforts at the UN were however blocked by the Soviet Union in the Security council. India's aid to the Mukti Bahini continued unabated, and fighting between the Mukti Bahini and the Pakistani Forces grew increasingly vicious.

== Third Indo−Pakistani War ==
The Indo-Soviet treaty had provided India with cover against any possible Chinese intervention in aid of Pakistan if and when the conflict precipitated. To the Pakistani leadership, it became clear that armed Indian intervention and secession of East Pakistan was becoming inevitable.

On 3 December, Pakistan preemptively launched Operation Chengiz Khan against India, marking the official initiation of hostilities of the Indo-Pak war of 1971. The Indian response was a defensive military strategy in the western theatre while a massive, coordinated and decisive offensive thrust into East-Pakistan. On 5 December, United States began attempts for a UN-sponsored ceasefire, which were twice vetoed by the USSR in the security council. India extended her recognition of Bangladesh on 6 December. On 8 December, Washington received intelligence reports that India was planning an offensive into West Pakistan. It was in this situation that the United States dispatched a ten-ship naval task force, the US Task Force 74, from the Seventh Fleet off South Vietnam into the Bay of Bengal.

=== U.S. diplomatic initiatives ===
With intelligence reports indicating the Indian cabinet was discussing the scopes of offensive into West Pakistan, on 10 December, the decision was taken by US to assemble a task force at Malacca strait, spearheaded by USS Enterprise. The force was to be capable of overshadowing the four Soviet ships already in the Bay of Bengal.

=== Deployment ===
The task force was headed by USS Enterprise, at the time and still the largest aircraft carrier in the world by length. She was flying the flag of Rear-Admiral Damon W. Cooper, Commander Carrier Division Five. Escorts included three guided missile destroyers: USS King (DDG-41), USS Decatur (DDG-31), and USS Parsons (DDG-33); four gun destroyers USS Bausell (DD-845), USS Orleck (DD-886), USS McKean (DD-784) and USS Richard B. Anderson; and a nuclear attack submarine. In addition, it consisted of amphibious assault carrier USS Tripoli (LPH-10), carrying a 200 strong Marine battalion and twenty five assault helicopters; the ammunition ship USS Haleakala (AE-25); and USS White Plains (AFS-4), an auxiliary fleet supply ship from Subic Bay Naval Base in the Philippines, which loaded over 60 Tons of mail and Christmas packages for the Task Force before leaving Subic Bay to join Task Force 74 on 19 December. Aboard Tripoli, according to her Command History for 1971, were Commander, Amphibious Squadron 5; 31st Marine Amphibious Unit; 2nd Battalion, 4th Marine Regiment; and Marine Medium Helicopter Squadron 165.

Enterprise was at this time at the Tonkin Gulf area. Recovering her airborne aircraft and transferring personnel who were required to stay to the USS Constellation (CVA-64), she prepared to head off. The task force was delayed while the support ships refueled, it held off East of Singapore, and was ordered into the Indian Ocean on 14 December. crossed Malacca straits on the nights of 13–14 December and entered the Bay of Bengal on the morning of 15 December. The group was required to proceed slowly, averaging a speed of 15 knots, both to conserve fuel as well as to allow advance information on its heading.

=== Objectives ===
The US government stated at the time that the goal of the task force was to help evacuate Pakistani forces from East Pakistan following a ceasefire.

=== Standoff with Soviet naval force and aftermath ===
The slow progress of Task Force 74 met an increased Soviet naval presence in the Indian Ocean. Both forces maintained their presence in the theatre until January 1972, well after from the operations on the ground was clear that Pakistan was in no position to continue the war. It was reported that the ships Dmitry Pozharsky, Varyag, BPK Vladivostok, Strogiy, two additional destroyers, two whisky class submarines and two minesweepers from the Soviet Pacific fleet were deployed.

=== Soviet response and standoff ===
On 6 and 13 December 1971, the Soviet Navy dispatched two groups of cruisers and destroyers and a submarine armed with nuclear missiles from Vladivostok; they trailed US Task Force 74 into the Indian Ocean from 18 December 1971 until 7 January 1972.

== See also ==
- PNS Muhafiz
- INS Khukri
- Indo-Pakistani War of 1971
- Timeline of the Bangladesh Liberation War
- Military plans of the Bangladesh Liberation War
- Mitro Bahini order of battle
- Pakistan Army order of battle, December 1971
- Evolution of Pakistan Eastern Command plan
- 1971 Bangladesh genocide
- Operation Searchlight
- Indo-Pakistani wars and conflicts
- Military history of India
- List of military disasters
- List of wars involving India
