= General Berkeley =

General Berkeley may refer to:

- George Berkeley (British Army officer) (1785–1857), British Army general
- Henry Berkeley (British Army officer) (after 1682–1736), British Army brigadier general
- James P. Berkeley (1907–1995), U.S. Marine Corps lieutenant general
- Randolph C. Berkeley (1875–1960), U.S. Marine Corps major general
