= Rembrandt C. Robinson =

American navy officer (1924–1972)

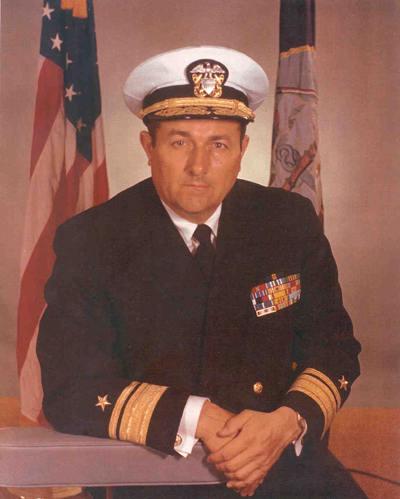
- Born: October 2, 1924; Clearfield, Pennsylvania, U.S.
- Died: May 8, 1972 (aged 47); Gulf of Tonkin
- Burial place: Arlington National Cemetery
- Military career
- Allegiance: United States
- Branch: United States Navy
- Service years: 1943–1972
- Rank: Rear Admiral
- Commands: USS Charles Berry; USS Bradford
- Conflicts: World War II: Invasion of Okinawa; Korean War; Vietnam War: Operation Pocket Money
- Awards: Navy Distinguished Service Medal (2); Bronze Star Medal (2)

Rembrandt Cecil Robinson (October 2, 1924 – May 8, 1972) was a United States Navy officer who was stationed in the Tonkin Gulf during the Vietnam War. Robinson died in 1972, in a helicopter crash; he was the only Navy flag officer killed during the Vietnam War. His remains were cremated and the ashes were spread at sea from USS Orleck off San Diego, California. Robinson has a memorial cross in Arlington National Cemetery.

Robinson was the last American flag officer to die as a result of official duty in a combat zone until Lieutenant General Timothy J. Maude was killed at the Pentagon in the September 11 attacks of 2001, and the last killed in the line of duty abroad until Major General Harold J. Greene in Afghanistan in 2014.

== Early life and education ==
Robinson was born October 2, 1924, in Clearfield, Pennsylvania, the son of Issac, a World War I navy veteran, and Helen Bailey Robinson. He attended Pennsylvania State College for a time before enlisting in the Navy Reserve as a midshipman in 1943. He was commissioned in the Navy Reserve as an ensign in 1944.

== Naval career ==
=== World War II ===
Upon commissioning, Robinson was assigned to the amphibious force, first on the staff of Amphibious Forces, Pacific Fleet, then aboard the Landing Ship, Tank LST-485. While aboard LST-485, he participated in significant combat operations, including the Invasion of Okinawa, and also participated in the post-war evacuation of Chinese refugees fleeing from advancing Communist forces. Following this tour, Robinson served at the headquarters of the Fourth and Twelfth Naval Districts, and served aboard three additional LSTs, before transferring to the destroyer force.

=== Korean War ===
In 1949, Robinson reported aboard USS English as chief engineer. While aboard English, Robinson received the first of two Bronze Star Medals, for meritorious service after North Korean shore batteries attacked the ship at Wonson. Upon completing this tour in 1952, Robinson served at the Bureau of Naval Personnel. From 1954 to 1956, Robinson served as executive officer of USS Walker, after which he attended the Armed Forces Staff College. Following his studies, Robinson reported for duty at the assistant head of the Command Policy Section, Strategic Plans Division, within the Office of the Chief of Naval Operations.

In 1959, Robinson reported aboard USS Charles Berry, then under construction at the Avondale Yards in Louisiana, as prospective commanding officer, and assumed command upon the ship's commissioning on November 25, 1959. A year later, Robinson served a brief tour of the staff of Commander, Cruiser-Destroyer Force, Pacific Fleet, and in December 1960 assumed command of USS Bradford. In January 1962, Robinson returned to Washington for a second tour of duty, this time as Objective Plans Officer, Strategic Plans Division, of the Office of the Chief of Naval Operations; during this tour, he completed his college education, receiving a Bachelor of Arts degree in Social Sciences from George Washington University. In August 1964, Robinson returned to the West Coast as Executive Assistant and Aide to the Commander In Chief, Pacific Fleet; during this tour he received the first of two Distinguished Service Medals.

=== Vietnam War ===
Robinson assumed command of Destroyer Squadron 31 in September 1968. During this tour, he received his second Bronze Star, for leading the squadron during combat operations in Vietnam. In 1969, he returned to Washington for a third time, as a member of the Chairman's Staff Group within the Office of the Joint Chiefs of Staff; during this assignment, he served as the liaison between Admiral Thomas H. Moorer, the then-Chairman of the Joint Chiefs of Staff, and President's Assistant for National Security Affairs Henry Kissinger. While serving in this capacity, Robinson received a second Distinguished Service Medal, and in 1970 was promoted to rear admiral; at the time of his promotion, he was one of the youngest flag officers in the Navy, and marked the third time he had been selected for early promotion. Also during this tour, Robinson helped update potential plans for the mining of Haiphong Harbor, first conceived in 1965. In 1971, Robinson returned to sea, taking command of Cruiser-Destroyer Flotilla 11 and Commander of the Seventh Fleet Cruisers and Destroyers (COMCRUDESGRUSEVENTHFLEET).

==== Operation Pocket Money ====
While heading up Kissinger's military staff in 1969, Robinson had helped to update plans for the blockading or mining of Haiphong Harbor, originally drawn in 1965. The plans became the basis of Operation Pocket Money, which called for the mining of Haiphong Harbor and a naval gunfire attack of the Do Son Peninsula. On May 8, 1972, President Richard Nixon ordered Pocket Money executed.

==== Death ====
In anticipation of the execute order for Pocket Money, Robinson flew with his chief of staff, Captain Edmund Taylor Jr.; Operations Officer, Commander John M. Leaver, Jr.; and Aviation (Intelligence/Plans Officer), Commander M.L. "Marty" McCullough, from his flagship, USS Providence to USS Coral Sea, for an air and surface attack coordination meeting with Rear Admiral Damon W. Cooper, Commander, Attack Carrier Striking Force, Seventh Fleet. Later that evening, as the helicopter was attempting to land aboard Providence with the four men aboard, an engine failure caused it to crash into the Gulf of Tonkin. Robinson was recovered, but pronounced dead aboard the ship. McCullough survived the crash, along with the helicopter's crew; Taylor and Leaver were never found. Robinson's memorial cross is located in Arlington National Cemetery, Section MF, Site 30-5. Robinson was survived by his wife, Joan, and his children.

== Awards ==
Robinson's awards include:

Navy Distinguished Service Medal w/ 5/16" Gold Star
Bronze Star Medal w/ Combat "V" and 5/16" Gold Star	Combat Action Ribbon	Joint Service Commendation Medal
Navy Meritorious Unit Commendation	China Service Medal	American Campaign Medal
Asiatic-Pacific Campaign Medal w/ 3/16" Bronze Star	World War II Victory Medal	Navy Occupation Service Medal w/ 'Japan' clasp
National Defense Service Medal w/ 3/16" Bronze Star	Korean Service Medal w/ four 3/16" Bronze Stars	Vietnam Service Medal w/ one 3/16" Silver Star and two 3/16" Bronze Stars
Knight of the National Order of Vietnam	Republic of Korea Presidential Unit Citation	Republic of Vietnam Gallantry Cross
United Nations Korea Medal	Vietnam Campaign Medal	Republic of Korea War Service Medal
