= 132nd Infantry Regiment (United States) =

Infantry regiment of the United States Army

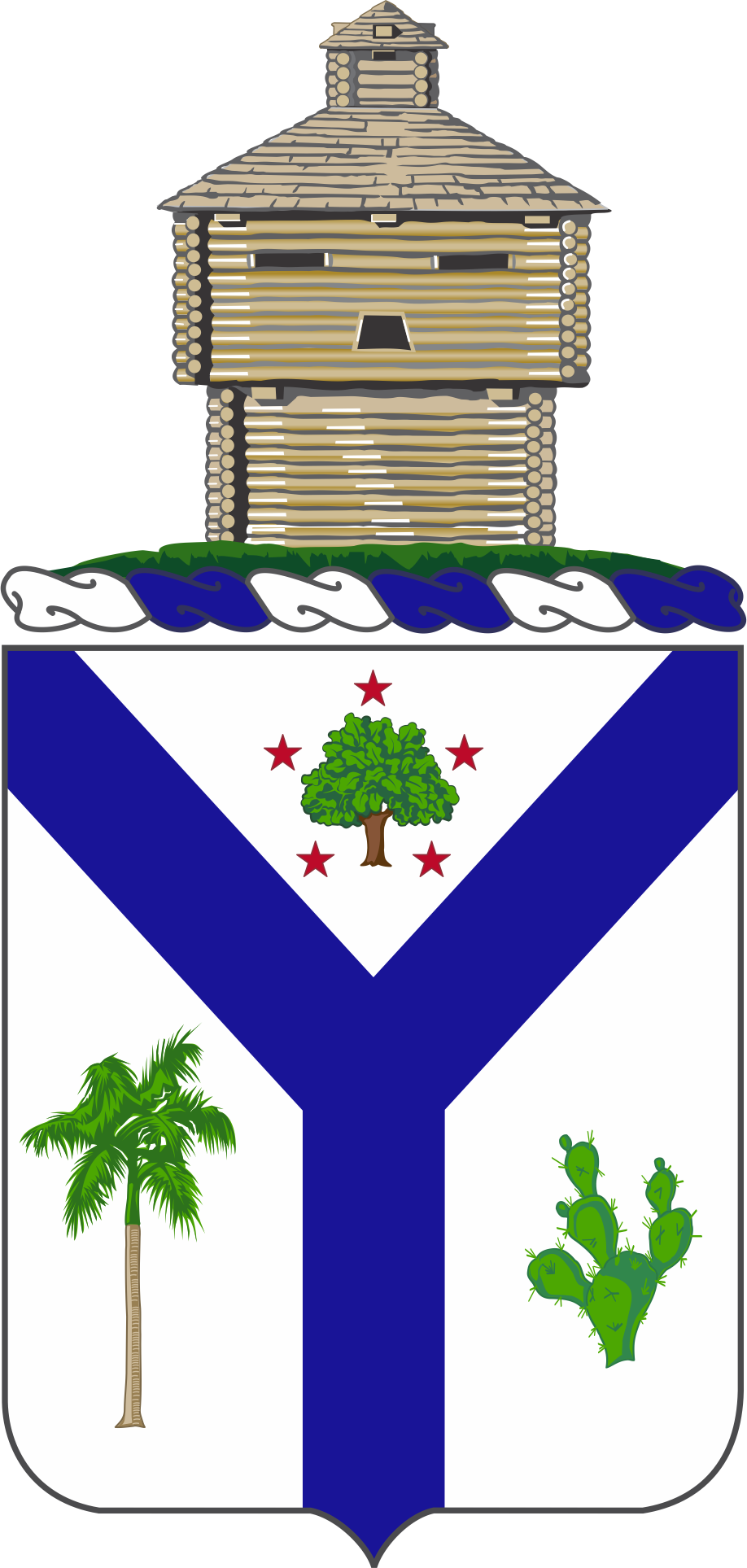
- Coat of arms
- Active: 1917-1954
- Country: United States
- Allegiance: Illinois
- Branch: Illinois Army National Guard
- Type: Infantry
- Motto: "Semper Paratus"(Ever Ready)

Commanders
- Notable commanders: Claude M. McQuarrie

Insignia
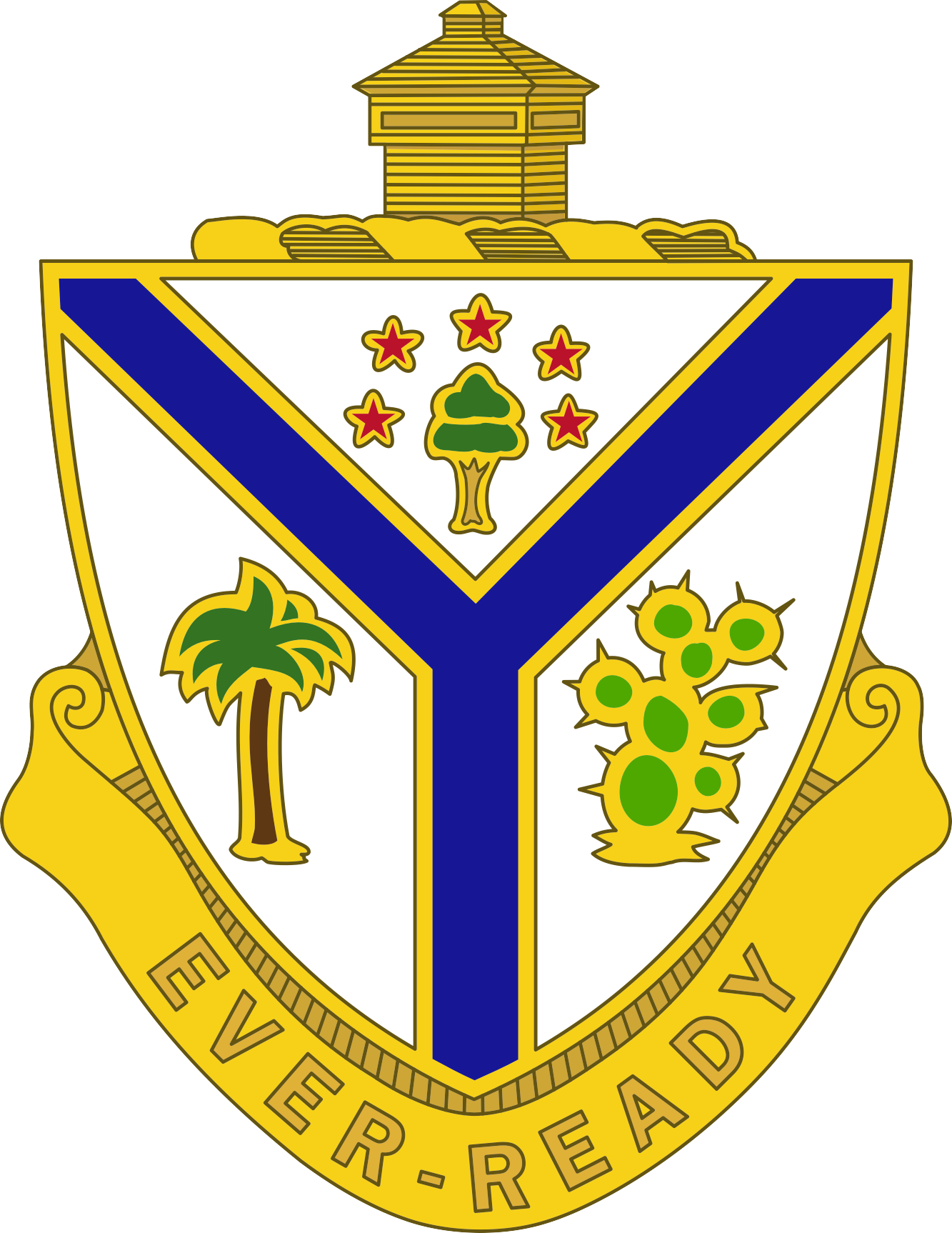
- Distinctive Unit Insignia

The 132nd Infantry Regiment was an infantry regiment of the United States Army, part of the Illinois Army National Guard.

It served as an active-duty regiment with the United States Army in World War I and World War II. Due to actions conducted in the fall of 1918 during WWI fighting in France, five men from the regiment were awarded the Medal of Honor: Johannes Anderson, Sydney Gumpertz, Berger Loman, George H. Mallon, and Willie Sandlin. In 1954 it was consolidated with the 131st Infantry Regiment.

== Civil War Service ==
The 132nd Illinois Infantry traces its lineage back to the 19th Illinois Volunteer Infantry Regiment of the American Civil War.

== World War I and interwar years ==
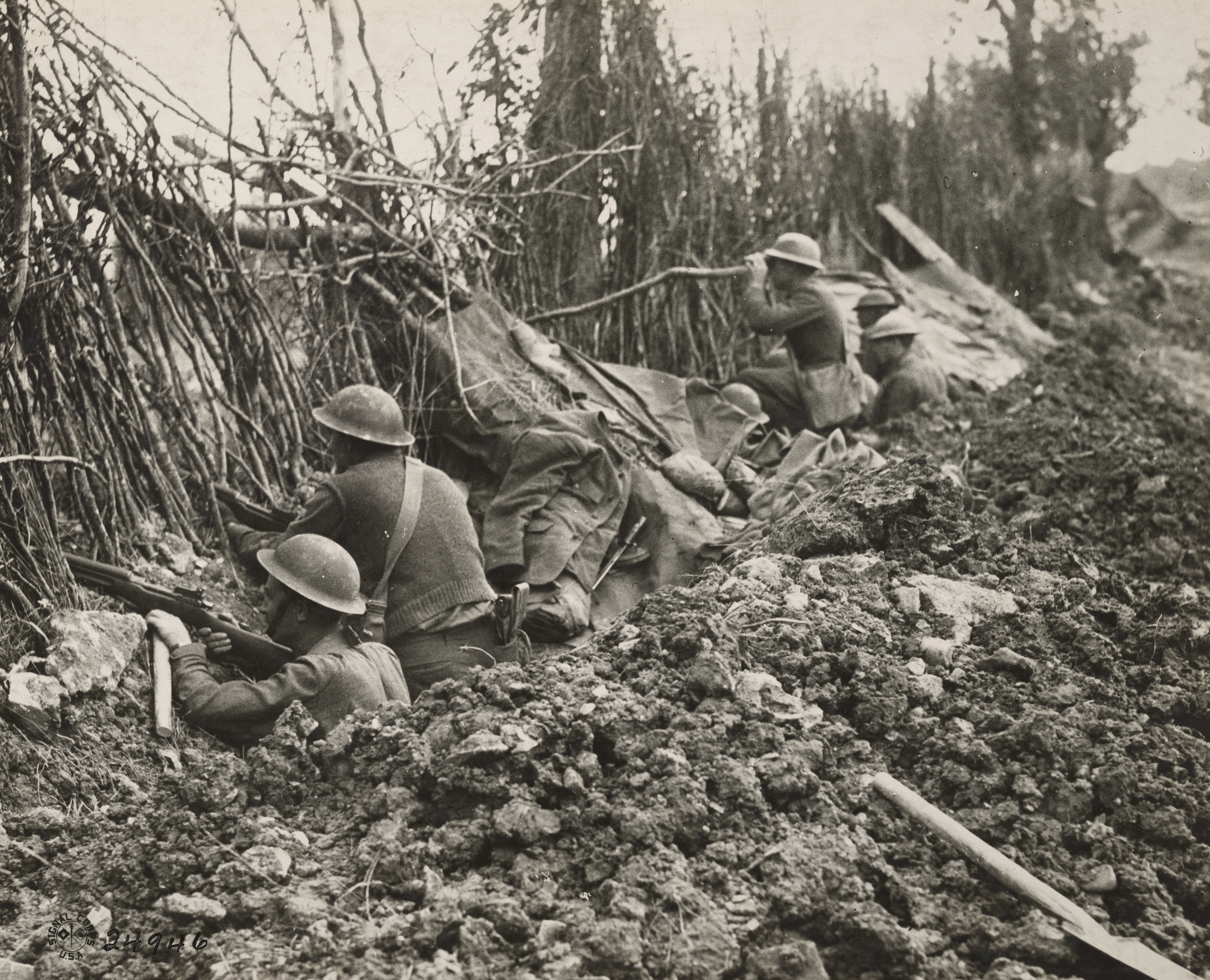
U.S. Soldiers of the 132nd Infantry Regiment on the front line in the Meuse Valley, north of Verdun. October, 1918

The 132nd Infantry Regiment was organized from other Illinois militia units, namely the 2nd and 7th Infantry Regiments, and activated on 21 July 1917. Assigned to the 33rd Infantry Division, it was redesignated on 12 October 1917 as the 132nd Infantry Regiment and trained at Camp Logan, Texas. Sent overseas in May 1918, the 132nd participated in the Battle of Hamel, the Meuse-Argonne Offensive, and the 1918 Somme offensive.

The 132nd Infantry arrived at the port of New York on 17 May 1919 on the USS Mount Vernon and was demobilized on 31 May 1919 at Camp Grant, Illinois. It was reconstituted in the National Guard in 1921, assigned to the 33rd Division, and allotted to the state of Illinois. It was reorganized on 13 December 1921 by redesignation of the 2nd Infantry, Illinois National Guard (organized 1920–21; headquarters organized 7 July 1921 and federally recognized at Chicago, Illinois) as the 132nd Infantry. The regiment, or elements thereof, were called up to perform the following state duties: 2nd and 3rd Battalions to perform riot control at a coal miners’ strike at Bloomington, Clinton, and Joliet, Illinois, 25 July–18 September 1922; 3rd Battalion for duties in connection with race riots at Herrin, Williamson County, Illinois, in June 1923 and 9–15 February 1924; martial law in connection with civil disorders in Mundelein, Illinois, 23–25 June 1926, and three companies for riot control at the Joliet Prison Riot, 18–23 March 1931. The regiment conducted annual summer training most years at Camp Grant, from 1922 to 1939. For at least one year, in 1936, the regiment also trained some 14 company-grade infantry officers of the 86th Division at Camp Grant. Inducted into active Federal service at Chicago, Illinois, 5 March 1941, and moved to Camp Forrest, Tennessee where it arrived 22 March 1941.

=== Commanders ===
- Colonel John J. Garrity (17 July–21 December 1917)
- Colonel George E. Houle (21 December–25 March 1918)
- Colonel Abel Davis (25 March 1918 – 31 May 1919)
- Colonel William E. Swanson (7 July 1921 – 27 July 1925)
- Lieutenant Colonel Nelson Morris (27 July–3 December 1925)
- Colonel Frederick E. Rand (3 December 1925 – 15 November 1930)
- Colonel Charles H. Davis (15 November 1930 – 3 July 1934)
- Colonel Herbert E. Algeo (3 July 1934 – 9 March 1937)
- Colonel Leroy C. Nelson (9 March 1937 – 15 September 1941)
- Lieutenant Colonel Andrew F. Casper (15 September–15 December 1941)

== World War II ==
The 132nd Infantry Regiment was inducted into federal service on 5 March 1941, at Chicago, Illinois, as part of the 33rd Infantry Division, and participated in divisional maneuvers at Camp Forrest, Tennessee. It was relieved from the 33rd Division on 14 January 1942, and assigned to Task Force 6814, an assemblage of units gathered for immediate transfer to Australia to defend against threatened Japanese invasion. On the morning of 17 January 1942, the last train car pulled away from Camp Forrest carrying the 123 officers and 3,325 enlisted men. "Being one of the first infantry regiments to be moved overseas, the trains were guarded by F.B.I. agents." On 20 January 1942, it sailed from New York and arrived in Australia on 27 February. On 6 March it sailed again, arriving in New Caledonia, where it became an infantry component of the newly created Americal Division on 24 May 1942.

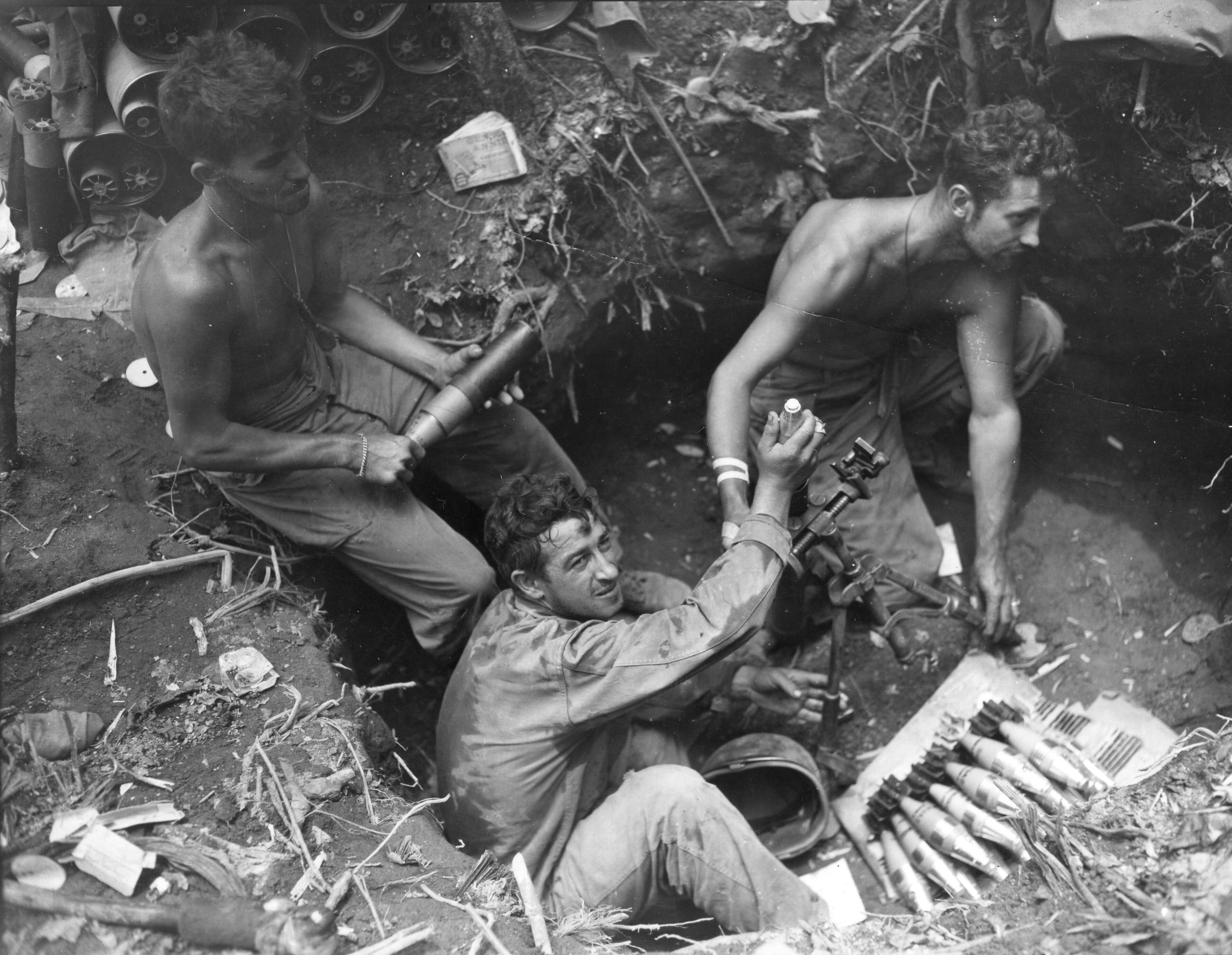
Mortar crew of Company B, 132nd Infantry Regiment. Bougainville, 10 March 1944

The 132nd Infantry arrived on Guadalcanal on 8 December 1942, where it engaged in combat in the Guadalcanal campaign, including fierce fighting to capture Japanese positions in the Battle of Mount Austen. The Regiment was relieved and sent to Fiji with the rest of the Americal Division to rest and refit.

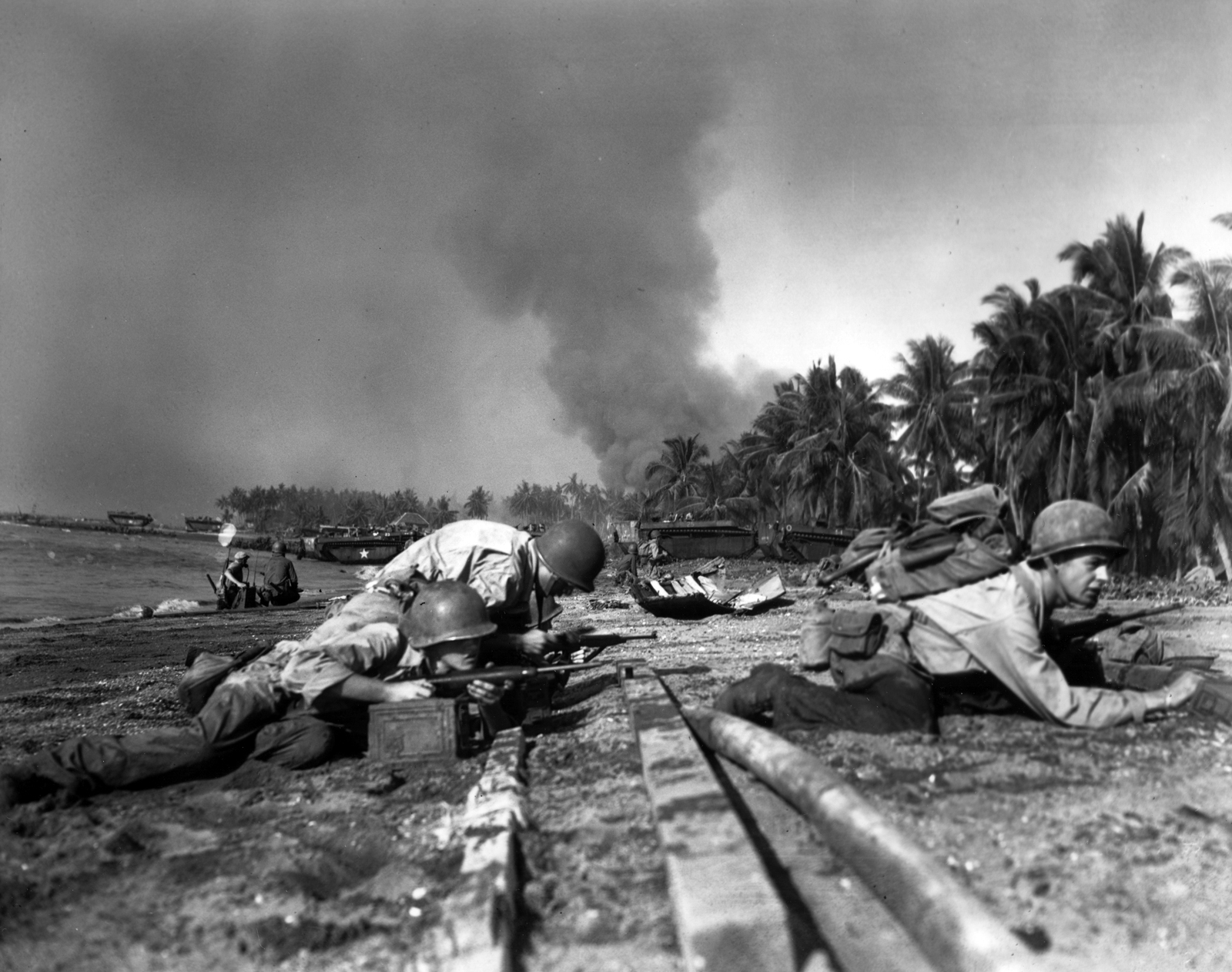
Troops from 3rd Battalion, 132nd Infantry during the Talisay Landing

The 132nd next fought in the Bougainville campaign. It arrived at Cape Torokina on 9 January 1944, and relieved the 3rd Marine Parachute Battalion, the 3rd Marine Raider Battalion, and units of the 145th Infantry, which then reverted to the 37th Division. The 132nd Infantry took over that portion of the perimeter paralleling the Torokina on the extreme right flank and engaged in patrolling and in strengthening defensive positions. On 5 April 1944, after establishing patrols along Empress Augusta Bay, the 132nd successfully launched an attack to capture Mavavia Village. Two days later, while continuing a sweep for enemy forces, the Regiment encountered prepared enemy defenses, where they destroyed some twenty Japanese pillboxes using pole charges and bazookas. Later, the 132nd secured the heights west of Saua River in fierce fighting that lasted until 18 April, when the last of the Japanese defenders were killed or driven off.

In 1945, the 132nd participated in the retaking of the Philippine Islands. On 26 March 1945, preceded by a heavy naval and aerial bombardment, troops of the 3rd Battalion, 132nd Infantry waded ashore across heavily mined beaches during an amphibious invasion of Cebu Island, at a point just south of Cebu City. Elements of the 132nd later secured Mactan Island and Opon Airfield in Cebu province. On 26 November 1945, the 132nd was inactivated at Fort Lewis, Washington.

The 132nd was relieved on 5 July 1946, from assignment to the Americal Division and reassigned to the 33rd Infantry Division. It was reorganized and federally recognized on 11 February 1947, at Chicago as a component of the Illinois Army National Guard. It consolidated on 15 March 1954, with the 131st Infantry and the consolidated unit was designated as the 131st Infantry, an element of the 33rd Infantry Division.

== Distinctive unit insignia ==
- Description

A Gold color metal and enamel device 1 1/4 inches (3.2 cm) in height overall consisting of a shield blazoned: Argent, a pairle Azure between chief an oak tree Proper within a circle of five mullets Gules, a palm tree to dexter and a prickly pear cactus to sinister both of the third. Attached above the shield a wreath Or, upon a grassy field the blockhouse of old Fort Dearborn Proper. Attached below and to the sides of the shield a Gold scroll inscribed "SEMPER PARATUS" in Gold.

- Symbolism

The shield is white charged with the pairle which appears on the shield of the city of Chicago, shield and pairle are white and blue, the Infantry colors. The green oak tree is for the WWI Forges Wood battle and the stars represent the five major operations in which the Regiment took part in France:

1. Amiens, 4 July - 5 August 1918
2. Somme Offensive, 8–20 August 1918
3. Verdun-Frommerville, 8–25 September 1918
4. Meuse-Argonne, 26 September - 21 October 1918
5. Troyon, 25 October 2011 - 11 November 1918

The palm tree recalls Cuban and the cactus the Mexican border service. The crest is that of the Illinois Army National Guard. The motto "Ever Ready" was later amended into Latin "Semper Paratus."

- Background

The distinctive unit insignia was approved on 13 March 1925. It was amended to change the motto to Latin on 16 October 1926. The insignia was rescinded/cancelled on 20 October 1961.

== Coat of arms ==
=== Blazon ===
- Shield

Argent, a pairle Azure between chief an oak tree Proper within a circle of five mullets Gules, a palm tree to dexter and a prickly pear cactus to sinister both of the third.

- Crest

That for the regiments and separate battalions of the Illinois Army National Guard: From a wreath Argent and Azure, upon a grassy field the blockhouse of old Fort Dearborn Proper. Motto SEMPER PARATUS (Ever Ready).

- Symbolism
- Shield

The shield is white charged with the pairle which appears on the shield of the city of Chicago, shield and pairle are white and blue, the Infantry colors. The green oak tree is for Forges Wood and the stars represent the five major operations in which the Regiment took part in France. The palm tree recalls Cuban and the cactus the Mexican border service.

- Crest

The crest is that of the Illinois Army National Guard.

- Background

The coat of arms was approved on 15 May 1924. It was amended to include the historical outline on 1 November 1926. The insignia was rescinded/cancelled on 20 October 1961.

== See also ==
- List of Illinois Civil War Units
- Illinois in the American Civil War
