= Willie Sandlin =

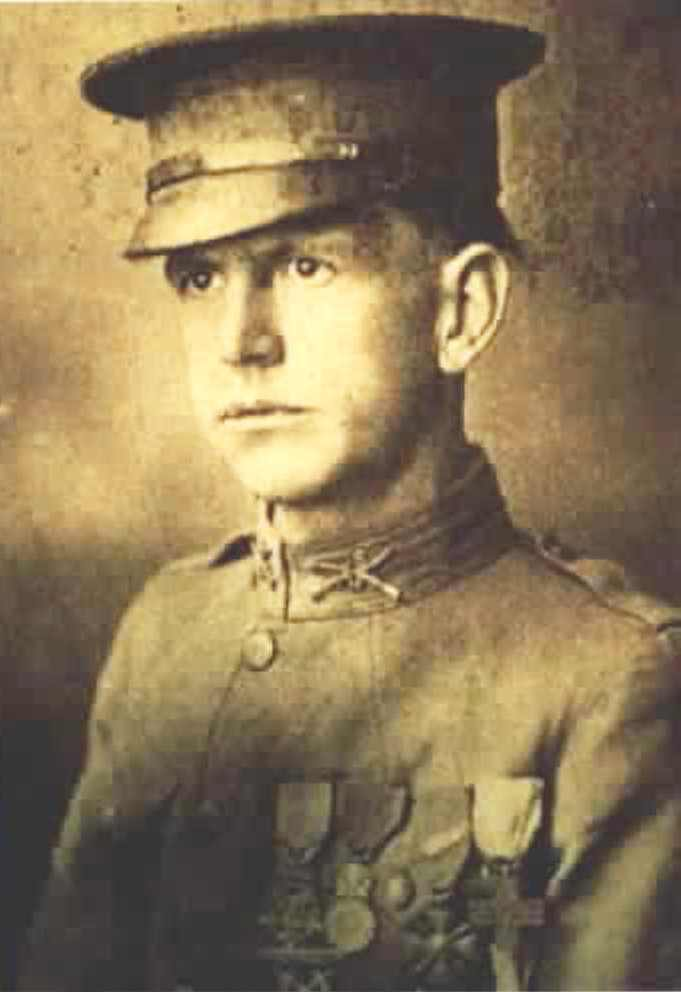
- Medal of Honor recipient
- Born: January 1, 1890; Breathitt County, Kentucky
- Died: May 29, 1949 (aged 59)
- Burial place: Kentucky Veterans Cemetery South East, Hyden, Kentucky
- Military career
- Allegiance: United States of America
- Branch: United States Army
- Service years: 1912−?
- Rank: Sergeant
- Service number: 2078103
- Units: Company A, 132d Infantry, 33d Division
- Conflicts: World War I
- Awards: Medal of Honor

Willie Sandlin (January 1, 1890 – May 29, 1949) was a soldier in the United States Army who received the Medal of Honor for his actions during World War I.

== Early life ==
Willie Sandlin was born in Breathitt County. Born of humble parents, he lost his mother when he was a small boy.

== Military service ==
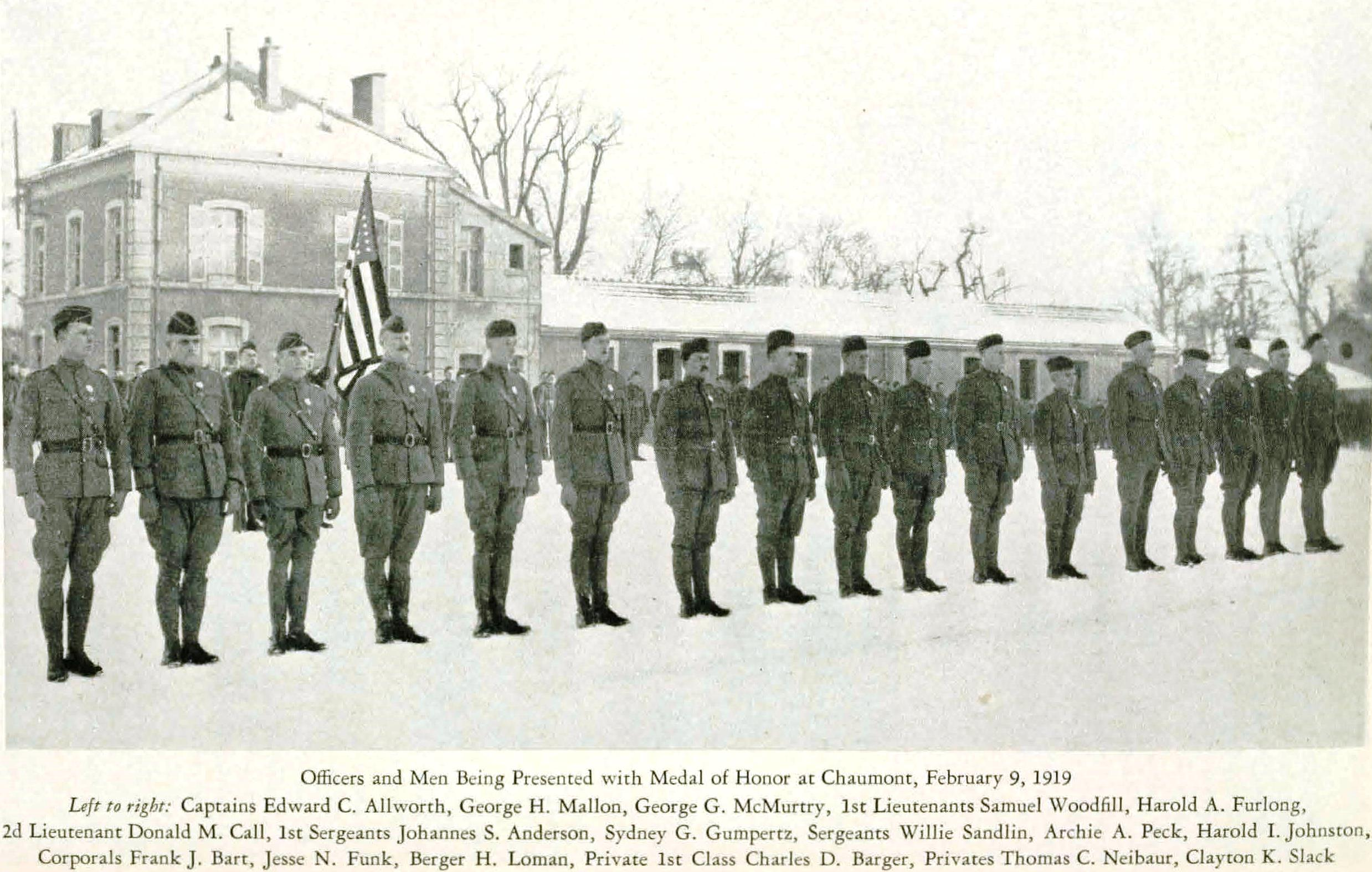
Medal of Honor Presentation Ceremony - February 9, 1919, at Chaumont, France. General John J. Pershing presided.

He enlisted in the Army in 1912 and served on the Mexican border. In 1917, he was sent to France with the 132d Infantry. Promoted to sergeant, Sandlin single-handedly destroyed three German machine gun emplacements and killed 24 of the enemy on September 26, 1918, at Bois de Forges. For that action, he was awarded the Medal of Honor on February 9, 1919. He was the only Kentuckian to receive the Medal of Honor in World War I. Of all the American servicemen who fought in the war, only Sergeant Alvin York received more decorations for valor than Sandlin.

=== Medal of Honor citation ===
Rank and organization: Sergeant, U.S. Army, Company A, 132d Infantry, 33d Division. Place and date: At Bois-de-Forges, France, 26 September 1918. Entered service at: Hyden, Ky. Birth: Jackson, Ky. G.O. No.: 16, W.D., 1919.

Citation

He showed conspicuous gallantry in action by advancing alone directly on a machinegun nest which was holding up the line with its fire. He killed the crew with a grenade and enabled the line to advance. Later in the day he attacked alone and put out of action 2 other machinegun nests, setting a splendid example of bravery and coolness to his men.

== Later life ==
After the war, Sandlin returned to eastern Kentucky and bought a farm on Owls Nest Creek near Hyden. He and his wife, the former Belvia Roberts, were active in the Frontier Nursing Service. They had one son and four daughters.

== Death and legacy ==
Sandlin, then 59, died on May 29, 1949, of a lingering lung infection resulting from a poison gas attack on his company in the Meuse–Argonne offensive. He was buried in Hurricane Cemetery near Hyden.

In September 1990, his remains were reburied in the Zachary Taylor National Cemetery in Louisville. Willie's wife, Belvia Roberts Sandlin, lived to be 96 years old. She died on February 11, 1999. Belvia was 47 years of age when Willie died and she never married again.

In 2018, the family of Willie Sandlin donated several artifacts, including Sandlin's pistol, uniform, Medal of Honor and Bronze Star to the Kentucky Historical Society in Frankfort.

The Kentucky General Assembly, during the 2016 regular session, named a new bridge crossing the Middle Fork of the Kentucky River on KY 30 in the Old Buck Community of Breathitt County the "Sergeant Willie Sandlin Memorial Bridge." State and local officials gathered at Highland-Turner Elementary School in Breathitt County on June 24, 2016, to formally dedicate the bridge in Sandlin's memory and honor.

On May 3, 2018, his body was moved from the Zachary Taylor National Cemetery in Louisville, to the Kentucky Veterans Cemetery Southeast in Leslie County Kentucky. Sgt. Sandlin and his wife Belvia Roberts Sandlin were the first burials at the cemetery.

== See also ==
- List of Medal of Honor recipients
- List of Medal of Honor recipients for World War I
