= VF-143 =

Fighter Squadron 143
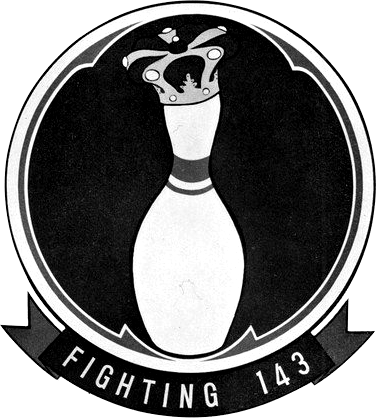
- VF-143 squadron insignia
- Active: 20 July 1950 – 1 April 1958
- Country: United States
- Branch: United States Navy
- Role: Fighter aircraft
- Part of: Inactive
- Nickname(s): Kingpins
- Engagements: Korean War

Aircraft flown
- Fighter: F4U-4 Corsair; F9F-6 Cougar; FJ-3M Fury

Fighter Squadron 143 or VF-143, also known as the World Famous Pukin' Dogs, is an aviation unit of the United States Navy originally established as a Naval Reserve squadron VF-821 on 20 July 1950. It was redesignated VF-143 on 4 February 1953 and deactivated on 1 April 1958. In June 1962, the squadron was reactivated, and currently is flying the F/A-18E as part of Carrier Air Wing 7 at Naval Air Station Oceana.

== Operational history ==
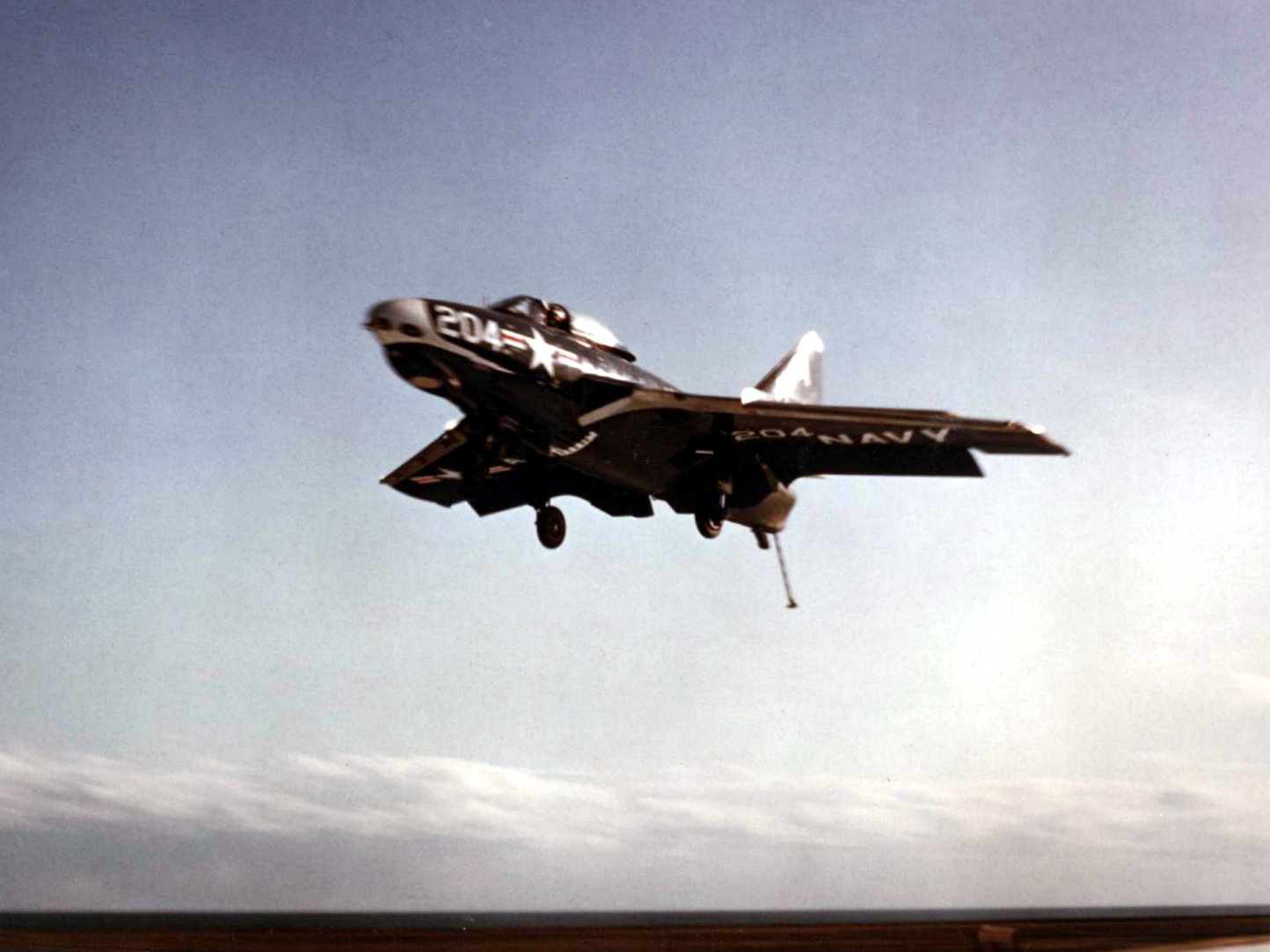
VF-143 F9F-6 lands on USS Kearsarge in 1953

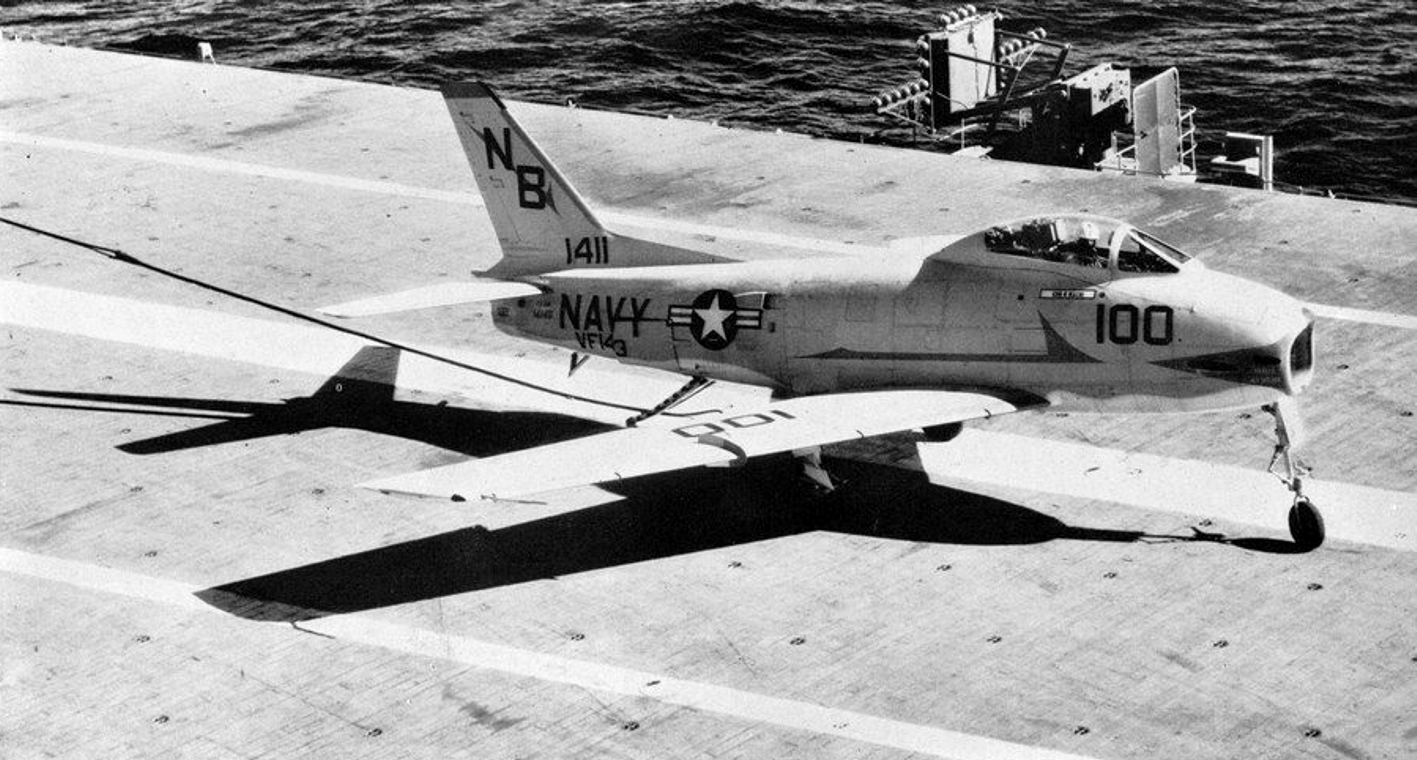
VF-143 FJ-3M lands on USS Hancock in 1957

VF-821 equipped with F4U-4 Corsairs was deployed on USS Princeton to the waters off Korea from 30 May – 12 September 1951. The squadron lost 4 F4Us and 3 pilots killed during this deployment.

In June 1952 VF-821 now re-equipped with F9F-6 Cougars was again deployed to Korea on USS Essex under the command of Damon W. Cooper. The deployment ended on 6 February 1953 without the squadron losing any aircraft.

VF-143 was embarked on the USS Philippine Sea in 1955.

VF-143 was embarked on the USS Hancock for a western Pacific deployment from 6 April to 18 September 1957.

VF-143 was reactivated in June 1962 at Naval Air Station Miramar, and embarked aboard the USS Constellation (CV-64) later that year. The squadron insignia changed to the 'Griffin' and they were called the 'Pukin Dogs'.

== Aircraft assignment ==
- F4U-4 Corsair
- F9F-6 Cougar
- FJ-3M Fury
- F4-B Phantom II
- F-14A Tomcat
- F/A-18E Super Hornet

== See also ==
- History of the United States Navy
- List of inactive United States Navy aircraft squadrons
- List of United States Navy aircraft squadrons
