= Operation Pocket Money =

1972 U.S. blockade of North Vietnamese ports by naval mining

- Part of the Vietnam War
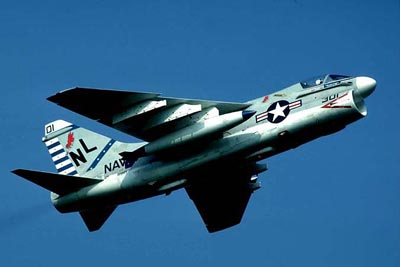
- A-7E of VA-22
Date	9 May 1972
Location	Hai Phong
Result	United States victory; Successful blockade of North Vietnam

Belligerents
United States	North Vietnam

Commanders and leaders
Damon W. Cooper	

Operation Pocket Money was the title of a U.S. Navy Task Force 77 aerial mining campaign conducted against the Democratic Republic of Vietnam (North Vietnam) from 9 May 1972 (Vietnamese time), during the Vietnam War. Its purpose was to halt or slow the transportation of supplies and materials for the Nguyen Hue Offensive (known in the West as the Easter Offensive), an invasion of the Republic of Vietnam (South Vietnam), by forces of the People's Army of Vietnam (PAVN), that had been launched on 30 March. Pocket Money was the first use of naval mines against North Vietnam.

== Background ==
Nearly 85 percent of North Vietnam's import tonnage came through the port of Haiphong. Naval mining had been frequently considered, but always rejected because of the risk of provoking intervention by the Soviet Union or the People's Republic of China. United States withdrawal of military forces began in June 1969. The U.S. was unwilling to suffer the humiliation of accelerating withdrawal as Quảng Trị Province began to collapse before the North Vietnamese Easter offensive. On 4 May, Joint Chiefs of Staff chairman Thomas Hinman Moorer ordered Chief of Naval Operations Elmo Zumwalt to plan a naval mining mission under the code name of Pocket Money.

== Preparations ==
The operation was timed to coincide with a televised speech by President Richard Nixon at 21:00 8 May (Eastern United States time). The opening phase of the mining mission was assigned to USS Coral Sea. Carrier air wing Commander Roger Sheets planned the mission with air wing mine warfare officer Lieutenant Commander Harvey Eikel, who was VA-22 operations officer, and United States Marine Corps Captain Charlie Carr, who would be bombardier-navigator in the lead plane establishing the critical attack azimuth and timing the mine releases. Three A-6 Intruders would carry 1,000-pound (450 kg) Mk-52 magnetic mines to be dropped in Haiphong's inner channel, and six Navy A-7 Corsair IIs would carry 500-pound (230 kg) Mk-36 acoustic mines to be dropped in the outer portion of the channel. Each plane would carry four mines.

The Mk-52 mines were 80 inches (2.0 m) long and 19 inches (48 cm) in diameter. They were parachute-retarded and intended to be fitted with an aerodynamic nose cap during transport; but Coral Sea had only six nose caps, so each A-6 would suffer the drag penalty of two uncapped mines.

There were 37 foreign-flag ships in Haiphong: 16 Soviet, 5 Chinese, 5 Somalian, 4 British, 3 Polish, 2 Cuban, and 1 East German. The mines were set with a series time fuze delay of 72 hours to allow these neutral ships time to leave port, and another series time fuze would disable the mine after 180 days.

Guided missile cruisers USS Long Beach and USS Chicago moved north from the PIRAZ station off Hon Mat to within 40 miles (64 km) of Haiphong to protect aircraft mining Haiphong harbor at low altitude. To avoid exposing F-4 Phantom fighters to North Vietnamese ground-based anti-aircraft defenses, these cruisers patrolling offshore were given a free-fire zone for RIM-8 Talos missiles to engage defending MiG fighters approaching the coast from Phúc Yên and Kép airfields near Hanoi.

A free-fire zone above 1,000 feet (300 m) was proposed for the cruisers at a planning meeting aboard Coral Sea. Commander Sheets lowered the free fire zone floor to 500 feet (150 m) because the minelaying aircraft would stay under that ceiling and he had never seen MiGs above a few thousand feet. As Rear Admiral Rembrandt C. Robinson, commander of the Seventh Fleet cruisers and destroyers and his staff were returning from the meeting to his flagship USS Providence at 22:45 on 8 May, the Sikorsky SH-3 Sea King carrying them lost power while approaching the flagship. The helicopter landed on the edge of the flagship flight deck and rolled overboard. The admiral drowned with his chief of staff and operations officer. Only the staff aviation officer and helicopter crew survived by realizing, in the darkness, that the helicopter was inverted, and they were hunting for the door on the wrong side of the cabin.

== Execution ==
On 9 May 1972, a Lockheed EC-121 Warning Star made an early morning launch from Da Nang Air Base to support the operation. USS Kitty Hawk launched seventeen aircraft for a diversionary airstrike against the Nam Dinh railroad siding. The Kitty Hawk airstrike found bad weather over the primary target and struck the secondary targets of Thanh at 08:40 and Phu Qui at 08:45.

At daylight on the 9th, a destroyer force struck the Haiphong Harbor air defense batteries with a 30-minute bombardment from their 5-inch (127mm) guns, which preceded the aerial mining. The strike force was commanded by Captain Robert Pace, who succeeded Admiral Robinson, and consisted of the USS Richard S. Edwards, Berkeley, Buchanan and Myles C. Fox.

The VMA-224 A-6A Intruders left Coral Sea at 08:40 with A-7E Corsairs from VA-22 and VA-94 and a single EKA-3B Skywarrior for electronic countermeasures support. Chicago set general quarters at 08:40, and within minutes launched two Talos missiles at two MiGs in a holding pattern awaiting air control vectors on the approaching bombers. One MiG was destroyed.

Coral Sea bombers began releasing mines at 08:59. Sheets radioed the carrier at 09:01 to verify the mines were in the water. Coral Sea forwarded the message to the White House where President Nixon was speaking. Nixon had been speaking slowly to avoid jeopardizing the mission; but upon receiving the message he stated:

I have ordered the following measures, which are being implemented as I am speaking to you. All entrances to North Vietnamese ports will be mined to prevent access to these ports and North Vietnamese naval operations from these ports. United States forces have been directed to take appropriate measures within the international and claimed territorial waters of North Vietnam to interdict the delivery of supplies. Rail and all communications will be cut off to the maximum extent possible. Air and naval strikes against North Vietnam will continue."

Additional mining missions followed over the next three days against the ports at Thanh Hoa, Phuc Loi, Quang Khe and Dong Khoi. By the end of the year Navy and Marine Corps bombers had dropped more than eight thousand mines in North Vietnamese coastal waters and three thousand in inland waterways.

== Results ==
On 4 August 1972 dozens of the mines spontaneously detonated. The U.S. Navy determined this was caused by magnetic radiation from a geomagnetic storm triggered by a coronal mass ejection on the Sun; this was confirmed by scientific research in 2018.

One British and four Soviet ships left Haiphong before the mines' time fuzes armed. The remaining ships were immobilized for 300 days while the port of Haiphong was closed. Harbor depth decreased by 2 feet (61 cm) because the mines prevented routine dredging. United States negotiators in Paris used an offer to remove the mines as a bargaining chip to encourage Hanoi to release prisoners of war. Operation End Sweep removed the mines between 6 February and 27 July 1973. USS Warrington was irreparably damaged when it detonated what was believed to be mislaid mines 20 miles (32 km) north of Đồng Hới on 17 July 1973.
