= USS Berkeley =

Charles F. Adams-class destroyer

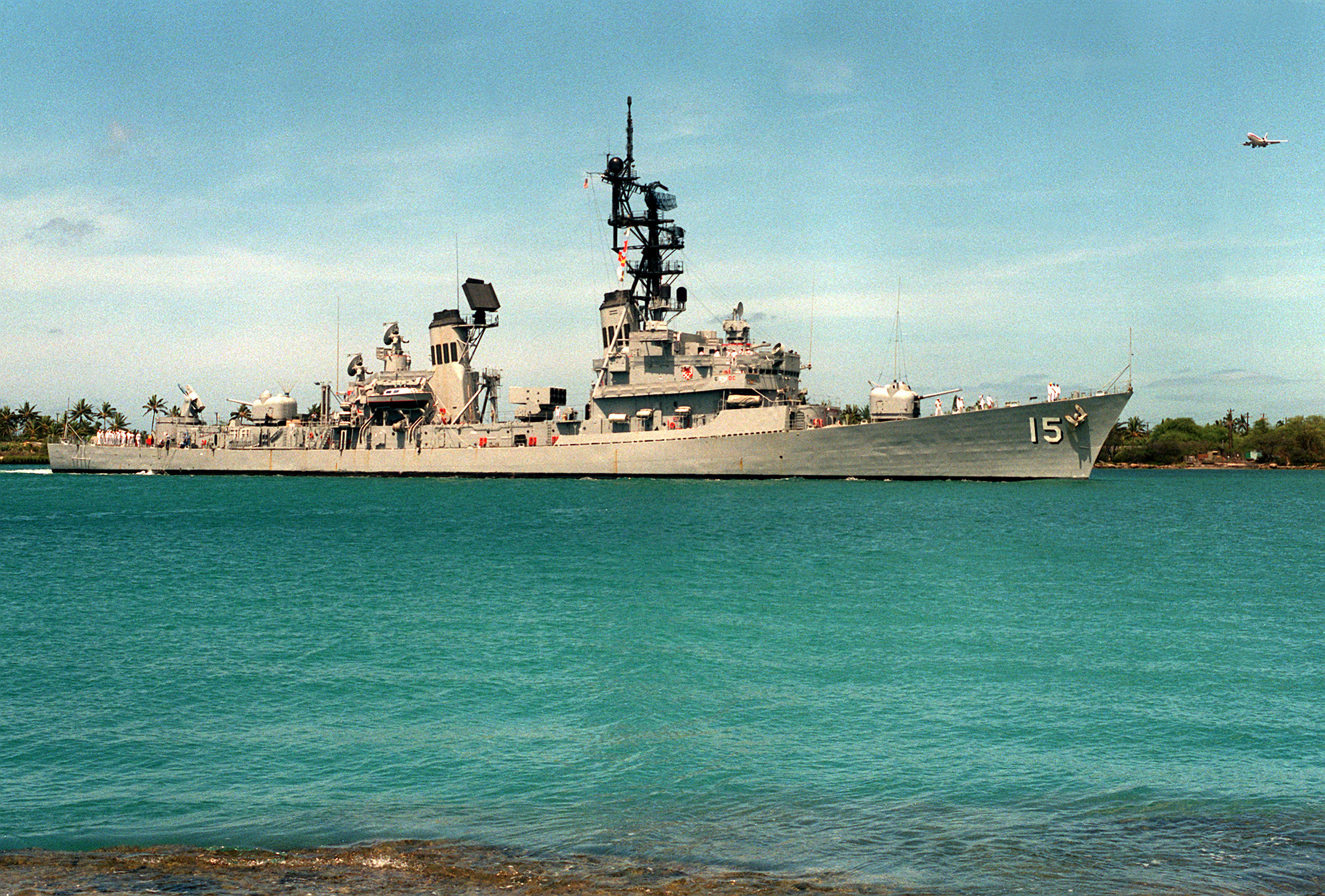
- USS Berkeley at Pearl Harbor in 1986

History

United States
- Name: Berkeley
- Namesake: Randolph C. Berkeley
- Ordered: 21 July 1959
- Builder: New York Shipbuilding Corporation
- Laid down: 1 June 1960
- Launched: 29 July 1961
- Acquired: 30 November 1962
- Commissioned: 15 December 1962
- Decommissioned: 30 September 1992
- Stricken: 1 October 1992
- Identification: Callsign: NAEH; Hull number: DDG-15
- Motto: Dieu Avec Nous; (God with us)
- Fate: Sold to Greece, 1 October 1992

Greece
- Name: Themistoklis
- Namesake: Themistocles
- Commissioned: 1 October 1992
- Decommissioned: 18 February 2002
- Identification: Hull number: D221
- Fate: Scrapped, 19 February 2004.

General characteristics
- Class & type: Charles F. Adams-class destroyer
- Displacement: 3,277 tons standard, 4,526 full load
- Length: 437 ft (133 m)
- Beam: 47 ft (14 m)
- Draft: 15 ft (4.6 m)
- Propulsion: 2 × General Electric steam turbines providing 70,000 shp (52 MW); 2 shafts; 4 × Combustion Engineering 1,275 psi (8,790 kPa) boilers
- Speed: 33 knots (61 km/h; 38 mph)
- Range: 4,500 nautical miles (8,300 km) at 20 knots (37 km/h)
- Complement: 354 (24 officers, 330 enlisted)
- Sensors & processing systems: AN/SPS-39 3D air search radar; AN/SPS-10 surface search radar; AN/SPG-51 missile fire control radar; AN/SPG-53 gunfire control radar; AN/SQS-23 Sonar and the hull mounted SQQ-23 Pair Sonar for DDG-2 through 19; AN/SPS-40 Air Search Radar
- Armament: 1 Mk 11 missile launcher (DDG2-14) or Mk 13 single arm missile launcher (DDG-15-24) for RIM-24 Tartar SAM system, or later the RIM-66 Standard (SM-1) and Harpoon antiship missile; 2 × 5 in (127 mm)/54 caliber Mark 42 gun; 1 × RUR-5 ASROC Launcher; 6 × 12.8 in (325 mm) ASW torpedo tubes (2 x Mark 32 Surface Vessel Torpedo Tubes)

USS Berkeley (DDG-15) was a Charles F. Adams-class guided missile destroyer in the United States Navy. She was named for Major General Randolph C. Berkeley, USMC (1875–1960), a Medal of Honor recipient for actions during the U.S. occupation of Veracruz (1914).

She was laid down by the New York Shipbuilding Corporation at Camden in New Jersey on 1 June 1960, launched on 29 July 1961 sponsored by Mrs. James B. Berkeley, Major General Berkeley's daughter-in-law; and commissioned on 15 December 1962 at the Philadelphia Naval Shipyard.

Berkeley was decommissioned on 30 September 1992 at a ceremony in San Diego, California, and stricken from the Naval Vessel Register. She was turned over to the Hellenic Navy on 1 October, and recommissioned as the Greek destroyer Themistoklis (D221). The ship remained in Greek service until her decommissioning on 18 February 2002 and was sold for scrap in 2004.

== Service history ==
=== 1960s ===
After fitting out at Philadelphia, Berkeley set out for her assigned homeport of Long Beach, California, mooring there on 16 March 1963 after visits to Port Royal, South Carolina; Kingston, Jamaica; and Acapulco, Mexico. Designed primarily to provide long-range anti-aircraft cover for task forces at sea, Berkeley devoted the next six weeks testing her Tartar anti-aircraft missile system's proficiency in that role. The warship's crew also conducted gunnery, engineering, and communication systems trials. In early May, the guided-missile destroyer demonstrated her capabilities to President John F. Kennedy, knocking down two jet drone targets with two TARTAR missiles. At the end of a short visit to the Rose Festival at Portland, Oregon, in early June, Berkeley entered the San Francisco Naval Shipyard for a three-month availability. At the end of the repair period, she became a unit of Destroyer Division (DesDiv) 12 and spent the rest of the year engaged in local operations in the Long Beach area.

The warship remained in southern California waters for the first 10 weeks of 1964, preparing for a Far East deployment. On 13 March, Berkeley stood out of Long Beach in company with the cruiser Topeka and 11 other destroyers bound for her first tour of duty with the 7th Fleet. After calling at Pearl Harbor, where the aircraft carrier Midway joined company, the task group steamed to the East China Sea for a month of training. Detached on 18 April, Berkeley proceeded to Hong Kong, where she embarked Vice Admiral Thomas H. Moorer, and sailed on to Bangkok, Thailand, for the annual Southeast Asia Treaty Organization (SEATO) conference. After rejoining her task group in late April, the guided missile destroyer spent the next two months screening the carriers Kitty Hawk and Ticonderoga and participating in a SEATO landing exercise in the Philippines.

After spending Independence Day in Sasebo, Japan, she put to sea with the Ticonderoga task group on 5 July for routine operations. This quickly changed, however, when the warships received orders diverting them to the South China Sea where they joined other Navy units off the South Vietnamese coast and in the Gulf of Tonkin. As part of President Lyndon B. Johnson's effort to limit North Vietnamese attacks on Laos and South Vietnam, the carrier launched Vought F-8 Crusader aircraft to reconnoiter suspected communist infiltration routes in eastern and southern Laos.

Berkeley continued to screen Ticonderoga throughout that summer. On 2 August, she provided anti-air protection to the task group during air strikes against North Vietnamese missile boats during the Tonkin Gulf incident. After American warships reported more attacks on 4 August, the guided missile destroyer again screened the carrier during extensive retaliatory strikes on North Vietnamese gunboats and torpedo boats on 5 August. Berkeley remained in the South China Sea during the relative lull that followed, patrolling the region during the slow buildup of American naval forces in Southeast Asia. The warship joined the aircraft carrier Bon Homme Richard while there and sailed for home on 10 October, mooring at Long Beach, via Yokosuka, Japan, on 21 November.

After leave and upkeep, the guided-missile destroyer entered the Long Beach Naval Shipyard for a restricted availability. Following these repairs, Berkeley spent the next six months carrying out training missions, passing various communications and engineering inspections, and preparing for her next deployment to the Far East. This pattern of activity—combat service in Vietnamese waters followed by repairs and training to prepare for her next deployment—characterized her service for the next ten years.

Underway with the carrier Hancock in late November 1965, Berkeley made a brief stop at Subic Bay in the Philippines before proceeding to the South China Sea for combat operations off Vietnam. Upon arrival on "Yankee Station" on 16 December, Berkeley joined Task Force (TF) 77 in support of Operation Rolling Thunder. This naval air campaign, begun the previous March, sought to cut the flow of munitions and supplies to the Viet Cong insurgents in the south by interdicting North Vietnam's logistics pipelines through Laos and across the demilitarized zone (DMZ). Assigned to the northern search-and-rescue (SAR) station in the Gulf of Tonkin, Berkeley, in company with the cruiser Topeka and destroyer Brinkley Bass, patrolled the area through the end of January 1966.

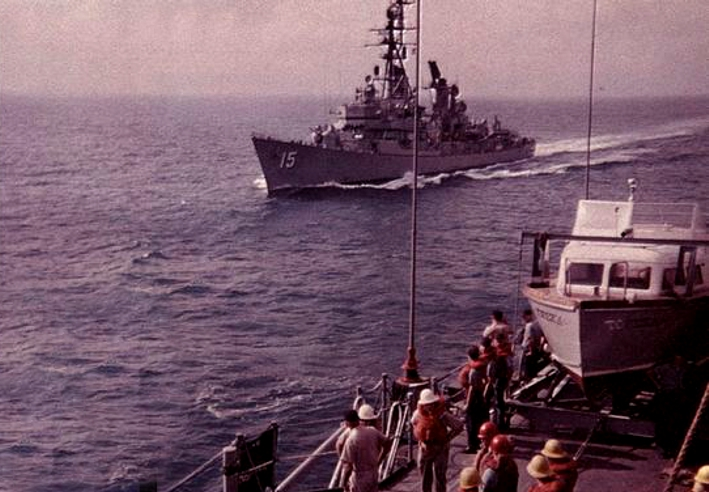
Berkeley comes alongside Topeka off Vietnam, in 1966

Following minor repairs at Sasebo in early February, and a port visit to Hong Kong, the guided missile destroyer returned to the Gulf of Tonkin for a second SAR tour on 26 February. Her first rescue mission took place on 14 March when Berkeley received notice that a McDonnell F-4C Phantom had ditched off Hon Me Island. In company with the destroyer Arnold J. Isbell, Berkeley coordinated rescue helicopter flights, and those of fighter aircraft from the carriers Ranger and Kitty Hawk, as the two warships closed the ditch site. Before they arrived, a United States Air Force HU-16 Albatross amphibian—which had landed to pick up the two Phantom crewmen—was taken under fire by North Vietnamese shore batteries. The amphibian was hit shortly thereafter, killing two crewmen and the aircraft burned and sank. Berkeley then closed Hon Me Island, drawing the enemy fire to her, and engaged in a 22-minute gunnery dual with the coastal batteries. At the same time, her combat information team directed friendly air strikes against enemy gun emplacements and coordinated three SH-3 helicopters from Yorktown and England as they retrieved the six survivors from the water. Although repeatedly straddled by enemy fire during this action, Berkeley suffered only minor damage from shell fragments.

Relieved two weeks later by Coontz, the guided missile destroyer proceeded to Qui Nhon, where she joined Operation "Sea Dragon" for a week of call-fire missions against communist supply craft and coastal infiltration routes. After completing this mission on 8 April, she steamed to Subic Bay, where the crew began preparing the warship for visits to Australia and New Zealand. Departing the Philippines on 17 April, Berkeley crossed the equator north of the Admiralty Islands and moored at Sydney, Australia, on the 29th. Over the next three weeks, the warship's crew took part in the annual "Coral Sea Celebration"—which honored the victory won by the Allied navies in May 1942—and visited Sydney, Adelaide, and Hobart in Australia as well as Auckland, New Zealand. Underway for home on 22 May, the guided missile destroyer stopped at Suva in the Fiji Islands and at Pearl Harbor before arriving at Long Beach on 6 June.

Subsequent to a leave and upkeep period, Berkeley entered the Long Beach Naval Shipyard for a restricted availability on 19 July. During that yard period, workers installed the new Standard missile system, including launch rails and guidance equipment. Upon leaving the shipyard on 25 August, the warship commenced a three-month missile development test and evaluation program. This entailed weekly cruises in southern California waters and the firing of Standard missiles at air and surface targets. Following the removal of test equipment in mid-December, the guided missile destroyer spent the rest of the month getting ready for upcoming fleet exercises.

Following the early January 1967 Exercise "Snatch Block," which was devoted to SAR and electronic countermeasure (ECM) procedures, Berkeley spent the next three months preparing for another Far East deployment. This included many local evolutions—such as shore bombardment, carrier screening, and ASW exercises—as well as numerous operational readiness inspections. During this period, her engineers and technicians busied themselves maintaining and improving the warship's complex electronic and fire-control systems, a task abetted by a three-week tender availability in early February.

Underway for the western Pacific on 29 April, the guided-missile destroyer crossed the central Pacific; and, after a short liberty period at Yokosuka, Japan, the warship headed south to Subic Bay, arriving there on 24 May. Underway again three days later, Berkeley sailed with the aircraft carrier Constellation to the Gulf of Tonkin before joining the cruiser Saint Paul and TU 77.1.1 for a "Sea Dragon" patrol. The task unit cruised off North Vietnam near Hon Me and Hon Matt Islands, searching for enemy waterborne logistics craft and firing on designated targets ashore. This pattern—small craft search in the morning followed by shore bombardment missions later in the day—became the daily routine of Berkeley's later "Sea Dragon" patrols.

After routine upkeep and replenishment at Subic Bay in late June and early July, the guided-missile destroyer commenced her second "Sea Dragon" patrol on 12 July. Detached 10 days later, she sailed north to the Tonkin Gulf SAR station where she monitored daily strikes over North Vietnam. During three weeks on station, Berkeley participated in seven SAR incidents and helped to rescue four pilots. Relieved on 11 August by William V. Pratt, the warship sailed to Hong Kong for a week of rest and recreation.

Following a tender availability at Kaohsiung, Taiwan, the guided-missile destroyer returned to the gunline on 22 September. Berkeley alternated duty between gunfire support for the 3d Marine Division in the I Corps area and night harassment and interdiction missions against coastal infiltration routes. Detached on 1 October, the warship visited Nagoya and Yokosuka before departing Japan on the 12th. Berkeley arrived at Long Beach on 25 October and spent the remainder of the year conducting post-deployment maintenance and preparing for various service inspections.

The guided-missile destroyer carried out local operations through April 1968 before moving into Long Beach Naval Shipyard for a maintenance overhaul. Upon completion of these repairs on 3 June, Berkeley loaded supplies and ammunition before steaming west on 5 July. After fuel stops at Pearl Harbor, Midway, and Guam—as well as a diversion south to avoid a typhoon near the Philippines—the warship arrived at Subic Bay on 28 July. Four days later, the guided missile cruiser departed for the coast of Vietnam and duty on "Sea Dragon" patrol. Over the next two months, Berkeley conducted three gunline patrols—firing nightly interdiction missions, searching for waterborne logistics craft, and bombarding supply routes—off both North Vietnam and the Vung Tau Peninsula. In between these missions, she retired to Subic Bay for upkeep. Her best hunting took place on the night of 10 and 11 September, when she and the destroyer Harwood combined to sink or damage 58 enemy supply boats.

After calling at Keelung, Taiwan, in late October and at Hong Kong in early November, Berkeley sailed back to Vietnam on 11 November. The rest of November passed uneventfully, with the warship on planeguard duty on "Yankee Station." Departing the area on 1 December, she stopped at Guam and Pearl Harbor before mooring at Long Beach on 20 December.

Aside from a few periods of underway training, which included her annual missile-firing exercises in late February, the warship spent the first three months of 1969 preparing for an extensive overhaul. Entering the Long Beach Naval Shipyard on 27 March, Berkeley received new weapons and communications systems as well as a general rehabilitation of all internal spaces in the warship. With this work completed, the guided-missile destroyer commenced sea trials and post-overhaul refresher training on 24 July. The warship also tested her new Standard missile system in September before turning to preparations for another Far East deployment which took up the remainder of the year.

=== 1970s ===
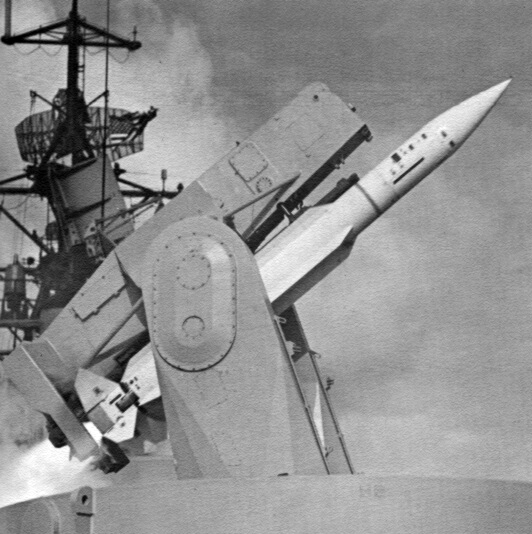
RIM-24 Tartar on Berkeley in 1970

Departing Long Beach on 13 February, the guided-missile destroyer made fuel stops at Pearl Harbor, Midway, and Guam before arriving at Yokosuka on 4 March. After two weeks of upkeep, she sailed to "Yankee Station"—arriving there on 23 March—and provided planeguard support for Constellation and Coral Sea. Then, starting on 10 May, the warship provided two weeks of naval gunfire support off South Vietnam. Between 25 May and 15 June, Berkeley visited Hong Kong and Kobe for rest and recreation before returning to South Vietnam for four weeks of gunline operations. Next came a port visit to Bangkok, Thailand, in mid-July, followed by three days of upkeep at Subic Bay. From there, the warship sailed for home on the 27th and moored at Long Beach on 14 August. The remainder of the year was dedicated to type training and upkeep in preparation for another western Pacific deployment in early 1971.

Those preparations continued into the new year, occupying her time for the first 11 weeks of 1971. Berkeley set sail on 16 March and, after brief stops at Oahu, Midway, and Guam, arrived at Subic Bay on 7 April. Following a brief upkeep period, she steamed to "Yankee Station" on 10 April and began escort duty for Kitty Hawk. During this tour, the guided missile destroyer's crew welcomed on board three Vietnamese midshipmen and provided them with six weeks of underway training. In May, after a brief period of PIRAZ duty with the cruiser Truxtun, Berkeley steamed to Japan, arriving in Sasebo on 19 May.

Fitted out with specialized reconnaissance equipment, the warship steamed to the Sea of Japan on 10 June for service as Pacific Area Reconnaissance Program (PARPRO) picket ship. She collected intelligence off the Korean peninsula for the next 10 days before mooring at Yokosuka on 19 June. The PARPRO equipment was quickly unloaded, and the warship moved south for a visit to Hong Kong.

Returning to "Yankee Station" on 5 July, Berkeley spent the next two weeks working on the northern SAR station. Heading south on 18 July, the warship passed through the Strait of Malacca and moored at Penang, Malaysia, for a port visit on 23 July. Following four days there, and just over a week in Singapore for upkeep, Berkeley returned to the Vietnam war zone on 7 August. Assigned to a naval gunfire support mission, the warship cruised off Cua Viet for the next three weeks in support of friendly forces near the demilitarized zone (DMZ). During this time, she fired 2,143 5-inch rounds at enemy targets. After a brief stop at Subic Bay, the guided-missile destroyer retraced her path across the Pacific and arrived in Long Beach on 16 September.

Following a tender availability alongside Piedmont, Berkeley remained in port, aside from a few type training days at sea, for the next six months. On 20 March 1972, the warship steamed to the Pacific Missile Range for three days of weapons systems exercises—including an ASW drill with the submarine Caiman—and, later that month, the warship conducted gunnery drills in the southern California operating area. These evolutions proved timely when, on 7 April, the warship received word to get ready for an emergency deployment to Vietnam. After a feverish 72 hours of preparation, Berkeley departed Long Beach on 10 April.

The guided-missile destroyer arrived in the Gulf of Tonkin, via Pearl Harbor, Guam, and Subic Bay, on 3 May. There, she joined other 7th Fleet units in heavy attacks against North Vietnamese military units pushing south along the coast. After firing numerous bombardment missions against enemy troops and tanks advancing toward Hue, Berkeley joined Operation Pocket Money, the mining of the river approaches to Haiphong, North Vietnam, on 9 May. In company with five other destroyers, the warship closed Haiphong to provide a protective barrage of 5-inch shells as A-6 Intruders and A-7 Corsairs from Coral Sea dropped magnetic-acoustic sea mines off that port.

Shortly thereafter, Berkeley moved to a surveillance position about 25 miles to the south and kept foreign merchant shipping informed of the newly cordoned waters. In mid-June, an attempt by the North Vietnamese to ferry supplies ashore was foiled when Berkeley, supported by helicopters and two other destroyers, sank over 30 small craft. After a brief upkeep period at Subic Bay in mid-July, the guided missile destroyer moved to the gunline and fired daily missions against enemy targets near the DMZ. Following a short yard period at Sasebo late in August, the warship conducted a final five-week gunfire support tour off North Vietnam.

After a five-day visit to Hong Kong in mid-October, Berkeley steamed for home—with brief stops at Subic Bay, Wake Island, Guam, and Pearl Harbor and underway refueling by the auxiliary Ponchatoula—and arrived at Long Beach on 10 November. With the signing of the cease-fire agreement at Paris in January 1973, American involvement in the war ended; the 1972 deployment was Berkeley's final Vietnam service. After a long holiday and post-deployment standdown period, the guided-missile destroyer's crew began preparations for a complex overhaul scheduled for early January 1973.

On 5 January 1973, Berkeley moved to Bremerton, Washington, and, on 12 January, moved into drydock at the Puget Sound Naval Shipyard. The overhaul gave the guided missile destroyer the new tactical data system, a sonar upgrade, new communications and electronic warfare gear, and two new 5-inch gun mounts. After five months in drydock, the warship moved pierside to finish the installations, which were finally completed on 1 November. Berkeley then spent the next eight weeks conducting sea trials, including a voyage to Victoria, British Columbia, and a joint exercise with the Canadian Navy.

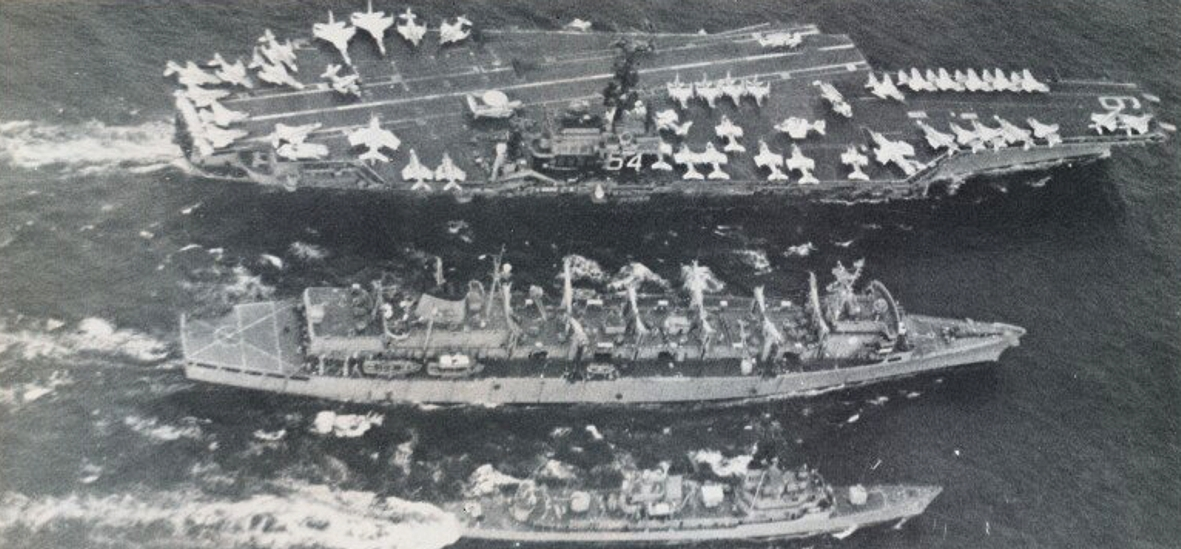
Camden replenishes Constellation and Berkeley in 1974

Departing Bremerton on 4 January 1974, the warship sailed south to her new home port of San Diego, arriving there on the 18th after a brief stay at Long Beach. With the end of American participation in the Vietnam war following the previous year's cease-fire agreement, the Navy concentrated on improving overall operational readiness, a routine markedly different from earlier training which had focused on preparing warships for combat duty off Vietnam. Berkeley, therefore, spent the next five months taking part in a series of fleet-wide inspections and maintenance programs. The guided-missile destroyer finally got underway to deploy on 19 June, steaming across the Pacific and arriving in Subic Bay on 10 July.

Sailing north on the 14th, Berkeley embarked American and Japanese midshipmen at Yokosuka and Kure for two weeks of training with units of the Japanese Maritime Self-Defense Force in the Inland Sea. Returning to Subic Bay on 7 August, the warship spent the next 10 weeks operating locally with Constellation. Then, in response to the growing Soviet Navy presence in the Indian Ocean, several American warships—including Berkeley—received orders to "show the flag" in the region. Departing Subic Bay on 27 October, she conducted a four-day port visit to Singapore, before getting underway for the Indian Ocean on 8 November.

In company with Constellation and the rest of TG 77.6, Berkeley conducted 11 days of operations with Pakistani, Iranian, and British naval units before visiting Karachi, Pakistan, on 19 November. The task group then sailed into the Persian Gulf for another week of exercises before returning to Singapore on 6 December. After an upkeep period there, the guided-missile destroyer sailed for home, via Subic Bay, and arrived in San Diego on 28 January 1975.

Following a two-month, post-deployment standdown, Berkeley spent the next four months engaged in a series of inspections, engineering tests, and exercises aimed at improving her overall readiness. In August, she completed various weapons and engineering training requirements and, in September, concentrated on ASW exercises. Following several missile-firing exercises in October and an extensive alignment of all weapons systems in November, Berkeley began preparation for her next deployment.

On 30 January 1976, Berkeley departed San Diego and set course for Hawaii on the first leg of the voyage to the Far East. Once at Pearl Harbor, however, the warship suffered several engineering failures which kept her in that port through February. Finally repaired in early March, she got underway on 12 March and, after a fuel stop at Guam, moored at Subic Bay on 1 April. Over the next three months, the guided missile destroyer conducted several "war-at-sea" exercises in the Philippines, including a missile firing exercise in late May and an ASW exercise with the frigates Sample and Lang in mid-June. Sailing north on 14 July, she visited Kaohsiung, Taiwan, and took part in Exercise "Sharkhunt XVI"—an ASW exercise with naval units from Taiwan—before returning to Subic Bay on 29 July. Underway again on 3 August, Berkeley carried out another missile exercise—knocking down one drone with two missiles fired—before sailing for home on 8 August. Following stops at Guam—where she received 10 days of tender availability—and at Pearl Harbor, the warship returned to San Diego on 6 September. Save for a brief two-week planeguard exercise with Constellation in early December, the guided-missile destroyer spent the remainder of the year in port.

Over the first five months of 1977, Berkeley stood several inspections and made other preparations in anticipation of an overhaul in Bremerton. Entering the Puget Sound Naval Shipyard on 6 June, the warship received new turbo-generators, a satellite communications system, and upgrades to her tactical data system. Floated out of drydock on 16 December, she remained pierside until dock trials were complete on 4 May 1978. Underway for sea trials the following day, the warship finally sailed home to San Diego on 13 June, arriving there on the 23d, after stops at Seal Beach and Long Beach. She spent the rest of the year testing her weapon systems and training with the newly installed equipment.

Early in 1979, Berkeley helped to test and evaluate two new missile systems. In February, she had one of the early Tomahawk missiles test-fired at her (set to fly close by) to see if the incoming Tomahawk could be acquired; and, in April, she made eight evaluation launches of the Standard missile. After passing a combat systems readiness test in May, the warship then prepared for her first overseas deployment in almost two years. Departing San Diego on 8 August, the guided missile destroyer transited the Pacific as part of Destroyer Squadron 13 and in the company of a Canadian Destroyer Squadron and Oiler with stops in Pearl Harbor, Midway, (off Midway the destroyers practices ASW atop a Soviet submarine), Guam and Subic Bay, and arrived in Yokosuka on 1 September. There, she joined Kitty Hawk and put to sea for seven weeks of operations in the East China Sea. During this time, Berkeley also made port visits to Hong Kong and Subic Bay. On 22 October, following the assassination of South Korean President Park Chung Hee, the task group took up a position south of the peninsula. The crisis eased after a few weeks, and the task group resumed normal operations. On 10 November, the Kitty Hawk group steamed south for operations in the South China Sea. On 21 November, the warships received orders to proceed west in response to the takeover of the American embassy in Tehran, Iran. Arriving in the Indian Ocean on 5 December, the task group sailed to the Arabian Sea and took up a position south of the Iranian coast.

=== 1980s ===
Following six weeks of contingency operations, Berkeley began her long transit home on 24 January 1980, arriving in San Diego via Subic Bay and Pearl Harbor on 19 February. Later that spring, the warship conducted several gunfire and missile-firing exercises before beginning a restricted availability at Long Beach on 5 May. During the ensuing six weeks, Berkeley received extensive engineering work, including some new boiler tubes, and equipment upgrades to her weapons and operations departments. The guided missile destroyer then spent the rest of the year conducting engineering tests and working out her new combat systems in air and surface gunnery and missile shoots.

Underway on 27 February 1981, Berkeley sailed to Pearl Harbor and then on to Guam, mooring there on 21 March. While en route to Subic Bay in early April, she conducted both antisubmarine and antiair warfare exercises, an underway routine that became the pattern for this deployment. The warship then joined other 7th Fleet units for a port visit to Pattaya Beach, Thailand, before participating in Exercise "Sea-Siam 81-2." Berkeley joined Royal Thai Navy warships in a variety of maneuvers, including tactical communications, formation keeping, and antisubmarine warfare. The guided missile destroyer then moved back to Subic Bay, after diverting for stops at Sattahip, Thailand, and Hong Kong, where she joined the Kitty Hawk battle group. Departing on 13 May, the group sailed into the Indian Ocean for six weeks of antiair and surface warfare exercises before putting into Geraldton, Australia, for a week-long port visit in mid-July. Berkeley returned to Subic Bay on 4 August for three weeks of maintenance before steaming for home on 1 September.

Arriving in San Diego on 21 September, the warship spent the next six months engaged in local operations and preparing for a regular overhaul. This routine was only broken by a call at San Francisco in late January 1982 and four-day visit to Mazatlan, Mexico, starting on 20 February. Entering the Long Beach Naval Shipyard on 29 March, Berkeley received new engineering controls, upgrades to her electronic warfare, communications, sonar, and weapons systems—including the new Harpoon weapons system. Perhaps even more important to her crew, she also received a brand new air conditioning system. Underway for sea trials on 18 March, the guided-missile destroyer carried out a series of evaluations, local operations, and refresher training over the summer and fall in preparation for her next deployment. These included underway exercises with the Kitty Hawk battle group in September and November.

After a flurry of preparations in the new year, she finally put to sea for the western Pacific on 13 January 1984, as part of Carrier Battle Group "Bravo" (CTF 37.1). Arriving in the Philippines on 30 January, Berkeley trained on the Tabones gunfire range during February; and, following a 12-day visit to Subic Bay, the guided-missile destroyer steamed to Pusan, South Korea, in early March. There, between 19 and 29 March, she participated in amphibious Exercise "Team Spirit 84." She then sailed to Subic Bay, for brief repairs, before steaming west for the Strait of Malacca on 7 April.

With the establishment of the United States Central Command (CentCom) the previous year—partly in response to the outbreak of the Iran–Iraq War in 1980—Navy warships began patrolling the Arabian Sea in support of CentCom's mission to protect American security interests in the Middle East. Berkeley arrived in the Arabian Sea on 16 April and served there for the next six weeks, helping to assure Western access to oil and seeking to stem the spread of Soviet influence in the region. During this period, she visited Al Masirah, Oman, for tender availability alongside Hector.

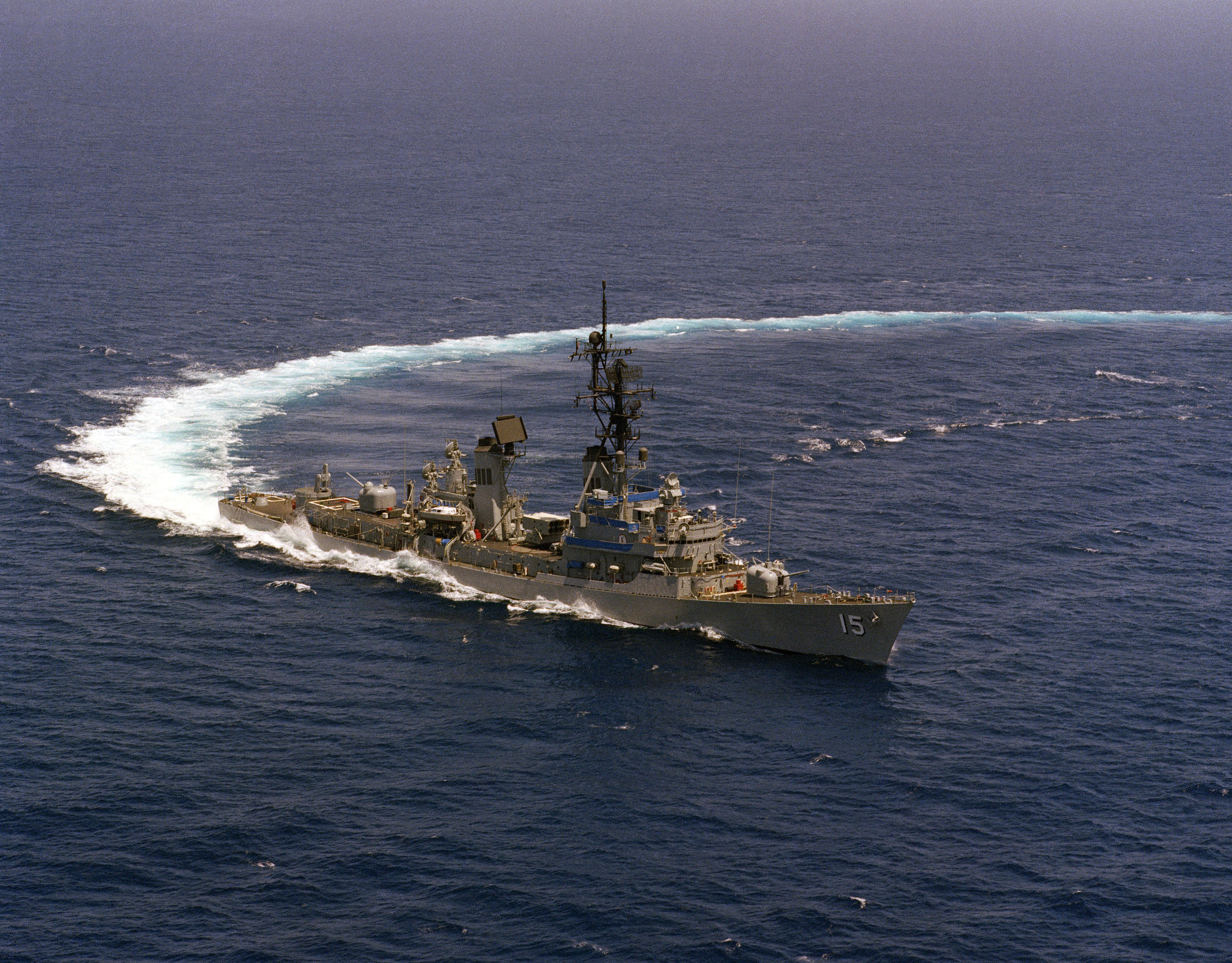
Berkeley underway on 2 August 1984

After another tender availability at Diego Garcia during the second week of June, the warship sailed for home on 15 June. En route, she stopped at Fremantle, Australia; Subic Bay, Philippines; and Pearl Harbor in Hawaii before arriving in San Diego on 1 August. Berkeley spent the next nine months conducting local operations in California waters, the highlight of which was the mid-October surveillance of a Soviet intelligence gathering trawler prowling the missile-test range at San Clemente Island. The warship then operated locally that spring until entering the Long Beach Naval Shipyard on 3 May 1985 for repairs to her sonar dome. Resuming local operations on 20 May, Berkeley followed the familiar duty pattern—independent steaming off southern California punctuated by regular upkeep periods in port.

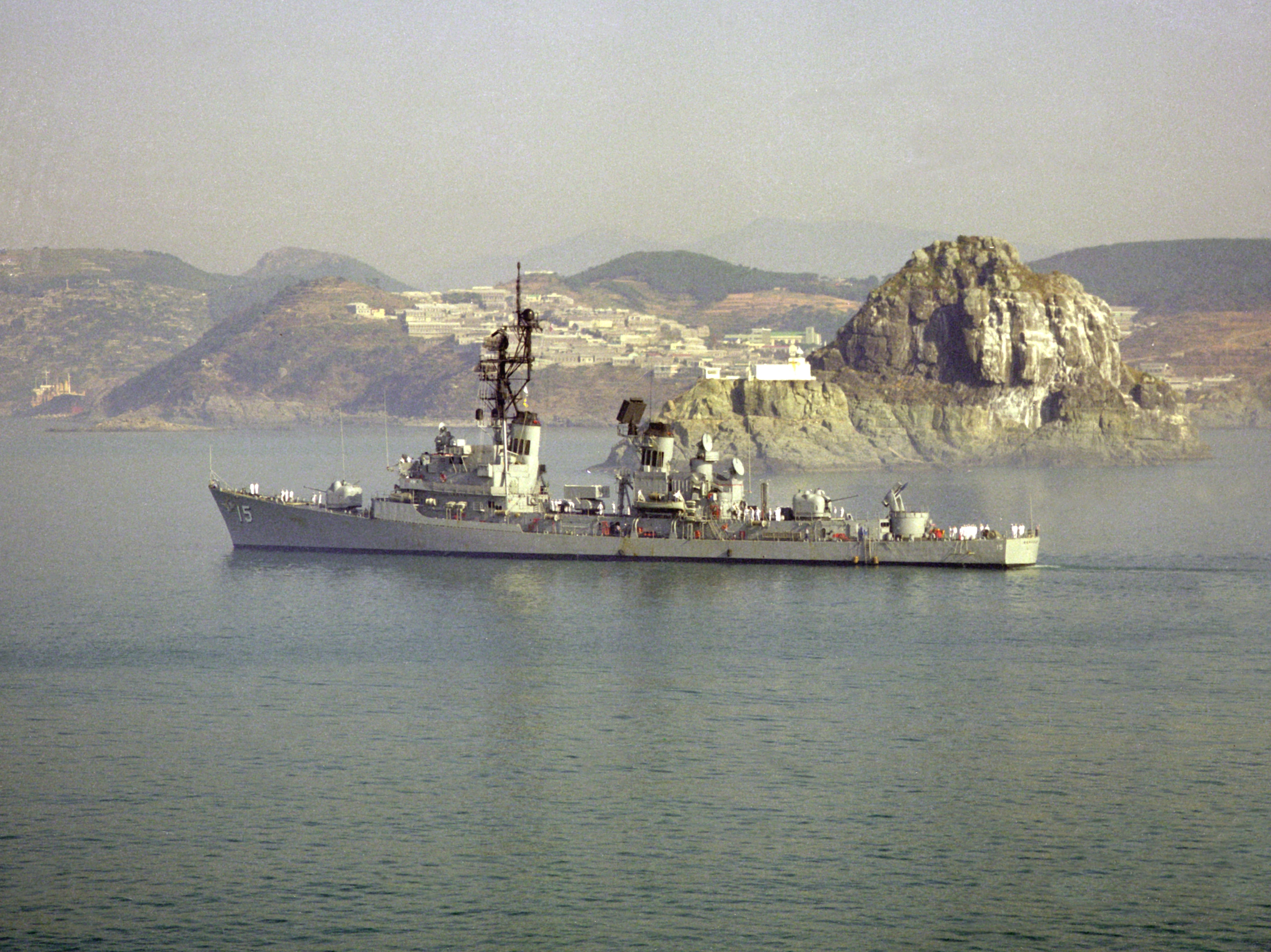
Berkeley underway in 1986

The warship's first exercise in the new year took place between 14 and 22 January 1986 when Berkeley conducted a naval gunfire support exercise at San Clemente Island. Then, after a mid-March command inspection and upkeep early in April, she took part in "RimPac 86," an international naval exercise held in Hawaiian waters between 21 May and 12 June. After two more months of local training operations and other preparatory tasks, Berkeley got underway for a Far Eastern cruise on 12 August.

In a change of pace from her usual route, the guided missile destroyer followed a great circle route through the northern Pacific and the Bering Sea before arriving at Pusan, South Korea, on 1 September. After an ASW exercise with units of the Japanese Maritime Self-Defense Force at mid-month, and another ASW exercise with South Korean warships in mid-October, Berkeley sailed south for the Philippines on 7 November. Following a brief stop at Subic Bay to refuel, the warship conducted Exercise "Burgonex 86" with the Royal Brunei Armed Forces between 15 and 23 November. Afterwards, she visited Pattaya Beach, Thailand, and then made a "freedom-of-navigation" demonstration off the coasts of Kampuchea and Vietnam in early December. Berkeley then stopped at Hong Kong and Subic Bay for port visits, before ending the year on her way to Chinhae, South Korea.

Arriving there on 3 January 1987, the warship conducted an ASW exercise in the Sea of Japan in early January before heading for home on 12 January. The next day, however, she suffered a pressure failure in her sonar dome and diverted to Guam for temporary repairs. Underway again on 24 January, Berkeley returned to San Diego, via Pearl Harbor, on 12 February. After a two-week leave and upkeep standdown, the warship resumed her familiar west coast routine. This included various weapons and supply inspections, equipment alterations in the shipyard—including more repairs to her sonar dome that summer—and training ashore for crew members. She rounded out the year with refresher training off southern California punctuated by minor repair periods alongside Acadia.

Berkeley spent the spring of 1988 preparing for her next overseas deployment, on which she embarked on 6 July. In company with the battleship New Jersey and TG 70.1, the warship took the great circle route to South Korea, arriving at Pusan on 24 July. The group participated in surface warfare exercises with the South Korean Navy before heading south to Subic Bay on 5 August. Following a short availability there, Berkeley detached from the task group and continued farther south, arriving in Darwin, Australia, on 26 August. As part of Australia's bicentennial celebration, the guided missile destroyer spent the next five weeks visiting ports on Australia's northern and eastern coasts. Starting with a visit to Cairns from 4 to 8 September, she moved on to stops at Townsville, Mackay, and Gladstone before putting into Sydney on 26 September for a week-long naval celebration with over 60 warships from 16 countries. Berkeley then made a visit to Bell Bay in Tasmania before rendezvousing with New Jersey on 18 October for the transit home, arriving in San Diego via Pearl Harbor on 9 November.

Following a tender availability, the guided-missile destroyer spent the first nine months of 1989 conducting local training operations, standing combat systems' inspections, and undergoing a phased maintenance availability at the Continental Marine Shipyard between 17 April and 5 July. After a final series of inspections in August, Berkeley got underway on 18 September in company with the carrier Enterprise and six other warships bound for the Far East once more. Steaming north to the Sea of Japan, the warship participated in "PacEx '89," a joint exercise with units of the South Korean and Japanese Navies. During most of October, she carried out antiair, surface, and subsurface warfare exercises off the coasts of Korea and Japan, including four SEAL team insertions, before putting into Hong Kong on 31 October.

Sailing south, Berkeley arrived in Subic Bay on 11 November. After a two-week availability there, she moved to the Tabones training range to keep up her gunnery prowess. On 30 November, in response to a coup attempt against the Aquino government in Manila, the warship put to sea with the Enterprise battle group for contingency operations. As the crisis eased, Berkeley detached from the battle group on 12 December and sailed east to Thailand. En route, the guided missile destroyer took part in more "freedom-of-navigation" missions off Vietnam and Kampuchea, before arriving at Pattaya Beach on 14 November. After four days there, the warship moved on to Singapore for a week of upkeep.

Passing through the Strait of Malacca in late December, Berkeley and the Enterprise battle group sailed into the Indian Ocean and moored at Diego Garcia Island on 5 January 1990. Next, the group operated in the northern Arabian Sea and Persian Gulf—keeping an eye on the still-tense ceasefire between Iran and Iraq—until putting into Muscat, Oman, for a port visit on 20 January. Following exercises with the Sultan of Oman's Navy, Berkeley left the battle group on 1 February and headed back east. She participated in exercises with the Royal Thai Navy on 3 February and, after a five-day visit to Phuket, Thailand, steamed into Subic Bay on 18 February. From there, the warship continued toward home and arrived at San Diego on 15 March.

After a four-week leave and upkeep period, Berkeley resumed local operations out of San Diego. In addition to her usual training activities, however, the warship made several short indoctrination cruises for midshipmen. She also got underway in mid-July for a week of law enforcement operations with the United States Coast Guard. During these missions, which were intended to help interdict drug smuggling, the warship used surface-search radars and other equipment to spot small craft, which were then boarded by Coast Guard detachments. Although no drug seizures occurred, the warship did help the Coast Guard enforce maritime safety regulations. After returning to port on 23 July, Berkeley spent the rest of the year engaged in engineering inspections and exams.

On 11 February 1991, the warship embarked on another Coast Guard law enforcement mission off Central America. Berkeley began counternarcotics patrols off Baja California in mid-February; and, save for a 22 February visit to Puerto Quetzal, Guatemala, there she remained for the next five weeks. Returning to San Diego on 8 April for maintenance, the guided-missile destroyer then set out on a two-week Coast Guard law enforcement patrol on the 26th. This was followed in mid-May by a gunnery and missile exercise.

In early June, Berkeley departed San Diego and headed north to Oregon for the Portland Rose Festival, remaining there until 12 June. The warship returned to San Diego three days later and, over the next six weeks, conducted two midshipmen training cruises and another law enforcement patrol. In August and September, the guided-missile destroyer concentrated on refresher training and, in early October, she participated in underway training while in transit to San Francisco for "Fleet Week '91." Returning to San Diego on 25 October, the warship carried out a succession of engineering drills in the southern California operating area through November. Heading back to Portland on 2 December, Berkeley took part in the city's 50th anniversary commemoration of the bombing of Pearl Harbor.

In light of the defense budget cutbacks following the end of the Cold War, the Navy made its 1990 decision to retire 54 ships. Thus, Berkeley was tapped for deactivation and eventual foreign transfer. Inactivated at San Diego on 1 May 1992, she spent the summer preparing for transfer to the Greek Navy. Berkeley was decommissioned at San Diego on 30 September 1992, and her name was struck from the Navy list on 1 October 1992. She was transferred to the Hellenic Navy that same day and served as Themistoklis (D221).

Berkeley received 11 battle stars for Vietnam service.

== Hellenic Navy operational history ==
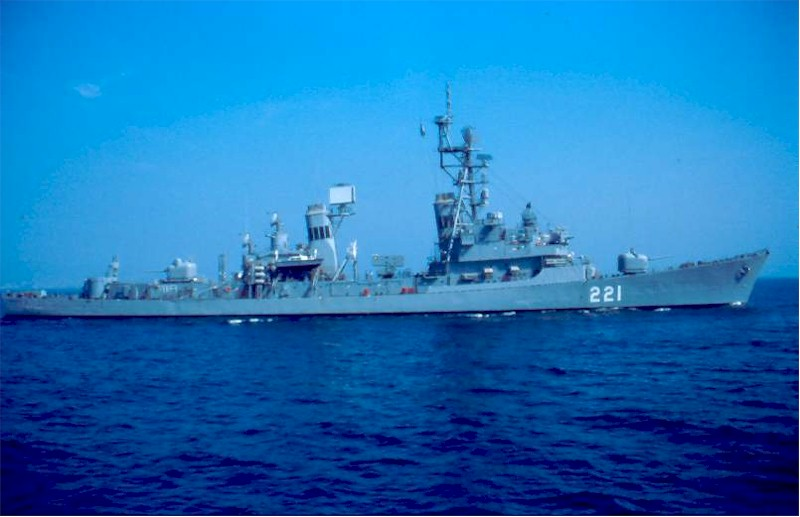
Themistoklis underway in the Western Mediterranean on 16 June 1999

USS Berkeley (DDG-15), after serving in the U.S. Navy, was transferred to the Hellenic Navy on September 30, 1992, and was recommissioned as HS Themistoklis (D221). It served until it was decommissioned on February 18, 2002. The ship participated in multiple international exercises and NATO operations. Ultimately, it was sold for scrap in 2004.

=== Service and Operations ===
During its time in the Hellenic Navy, it took part in significant NATO missions and exercises, contributing to national and international security efforts.

=== Decommissioning ===
On 18 February 2002, Themistoklis was decommissioned in Salamis, Greece, which was the site of the great victory by the ancient Themistocles. She was sold for scrap on 19 February 2004.

=== Legacy ===
HS Themistoklis was the fourth Greek naval vessel to bear the name, reflecting the legacy of the ancient Athenian statesman and general Themistocles.
