= Damon W. Cooper =

United States Navy admiral

Damon Warren Cooper
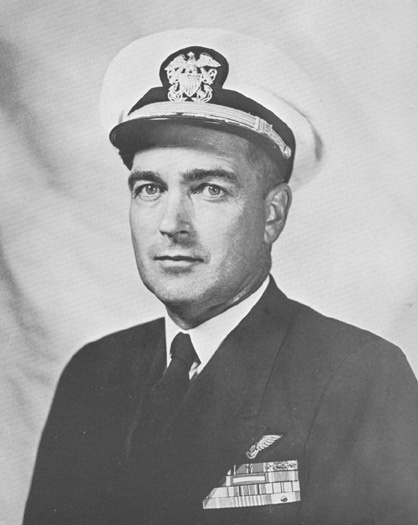
- Born: 27 April 1919; Elizabethtown, Kentucky, U.S.
- Died: 19 November 1985 (aged 66); Springfield, Kentucky
- Burial place: Saint James Cemetery, Elizabethtown, Kentucky
- Military career
- Allegiance: United States
- Branch: United States Navy
- Service years: 1941–1974
- Rank: Vice Admiral
- Nickname: Hutch
- Commands: Chief of Naval Reserve; Task Force 77; USS Ticonderoga; USS Pine Island; Attack Squadron 64; Fighter Squadron 821; Torpedo Squadron 24
- Conflicts: World War II; Korean War; Vietnam War
- Awards: Navy Distinguished Service Medal; Legion of Merit (2); Distinguished Flying Cross (3); Bronze Star Medal with Combat "V"; Air Medal (9); Navy Commendation Medal (2) with Combat "V"

Damon Warren "Hutch" Cooper (27 April 1919 – 19 November 1985) was a United States Navy Vice admiral who served in conflicts from the 1940s through the 1970s, including as the Commander, Task Force 77 during the late stages of the Vietnam War.

== Early life ==
He was born in Elizabethtown, Kentucky on 27 April 1919. He attended Western Kentucky State Teachers College at Bowling Green, Kentucky.

== Military career ==
He entered the United States Naval Academy in 1937. He was commissioned as an Ensign on 7 February 1941 and posted to USS Waters. In February 1943 he was detached for flight training at Naval Air Station Pensacola. Florida. After graduating from flight school he was assigned to Torpedo Squadron 24 which he commanded from August 1944 until August 1945, flying the Grumman TBF Avenger. For his outstanding service which included 60 combat missions in the Ryukyus, he was awarded the Distinguished Flying Cross with two Gold Stars and the Air Medal with eight Gold Stars.

In September 1945 he reported as navigator on board USS Kasaan Bay and from July 1946 to September 1947 was a student at the Naval Intelligence School, Washington D.C. he next served as intelligence officer on the staff of Commander Air Force, Pacific Fleet and in October 1949 assumed duty as assistant training officer and officer in charge of Advanced Training Unit Four at Naval Auxiliary Air Station, Cabaniss Field, Corpus Christi, Texas.

During the Korean War he served as intelligence officer on board USS Philippine Sea from August 1950 to January 1951. For his service in that capacity he was awarded the Navy Commendation Medal with Combat "V". After an assignment as intelligence officer on the staff of Commander Carrier Division Five, in September 1951 he assumed command of Fighter Squadron 821 aboard USS Essex flying the Grumman F9F-6 Cougar. For his service as commanding officer he was awarded the Bronze Star with Combat "V". He was also awarded Gold Stars to his Air Medal for completing 20 missions during the period from 1 August 1952 to 2 January 1953.

He served in the office of the Chief of Naval Operation as head of Aviation Armament Section in the Air Warfare Division from March 1953 to February 1955. He next commanded Air Task Group Three, on the USS Shangri-La and in June 1956 he reported as operations officer on staff of Commander Air Force, U.S. Pacific Fleet. He was a student at the Naval War College, Newport, Rhode Island, from July 1957 to June 1958. He joined the USS Independence as Executive officer when it was commissioned on 10 January 1959 and served on her until detached in July 1960 for duty as commanding officer of Attack Squadron 64. He also attended the National War College in Washington D.C. from July 1960 to July 1961.

He then served in the Programs Branch, Joint Chiefs of Staff, Washington D.C.. In April 1963 he assumed command of USS Pine Island and in July 1964 became commanding officer of USS Ticonderoga. He was awarded the Gold Star in lieu of a second Navy Commendation Medal for his service. While commanding the Ticonderoga in August 1964 the carrier participated in the Gulf of Tonkin incident launching F-8 Crusader fighters that attacked North Vietnamese Vietnam People's Navy P 4-class torpedo boats. Ticonderoga and USS Constellation later launched the retaliatory Operation Pierce Arrow attacks on North Vietnamese targets.

He was then ordered to the Bureau of Naval Personnel where he served as assistant director for Captain Detail (Aviation) from June 1965 to July 1966, then as deputy assistant chief for personnel control. In December 1966 he assumed command of Patrol Force Seventh Fleet/Taiwan Patrol Force/Fleet Air Wing One. For his service in the assignment he was awarded the Legion of Merit. He was promoted to Rear admiral on 1 July 1967.

In August 1969 he reported as assistant chief of naval personnel for personnel control. For his service in this capacity until August 1970 he was awarded a second Gold Star in lieu of the second Legion of Merit.

He assumed command of Carrier Division Nine in August 1970 and in March 1971 he reported as Commander Attack Carrier Striking Force, Seventh Fleet/Commander Carrier Division Five (Task Force 77). In December 1971, he led Task Force 74 aboard USS Enterprise to the Indian Ocean following the outbreak of the Indo-Pakistani War of 1971. He was promoted to Vice admiral on 16 August 1972. For his service in this role he was awarded the Distinguished Service Medal.

During Cooper's command of Task Force 77, the North Vietnamese launched their Easter Offensive in March 1972. The bombing halt over North Vietnam imposed at the end of Operation Rolling Thunder in November 1968 was lifted and bombing of the North (eventually codenamed Operation Linebacker) resumed in early April, with the Seventh Fleet responsible for Route Packages 2, 3, 4 and 6b. The bombing was halted again in October 1972 as peace negotiations resumed, however Cooper's Task Force 77 bombed the North again in December in Operation Linebacker II. In addition, Task Force 77 planes mined North Vietnamese ports and waterways in Operation Pocket Money.

On 12 April 1973 he assumed duty as Chief of Naval Reserve in New Orleans, Louisiana with addition duty as Director of Naval Reserve on the staff of Chief of Naval Operations.

The Tailhook Association named him as their U.S. Navy Tailhooker of the Year for 1973.

He retired from the Navy in 1974.

== Later life and death ==
He died on 19 November 1985 and was buried at Saint James Cemetery, Elizabethtown, Kentucky.
