= Randolph C. Berkeley =

US Marine Corps general and Medal of Honor recipient (1875–1960)

Randolph Carter Berkeley
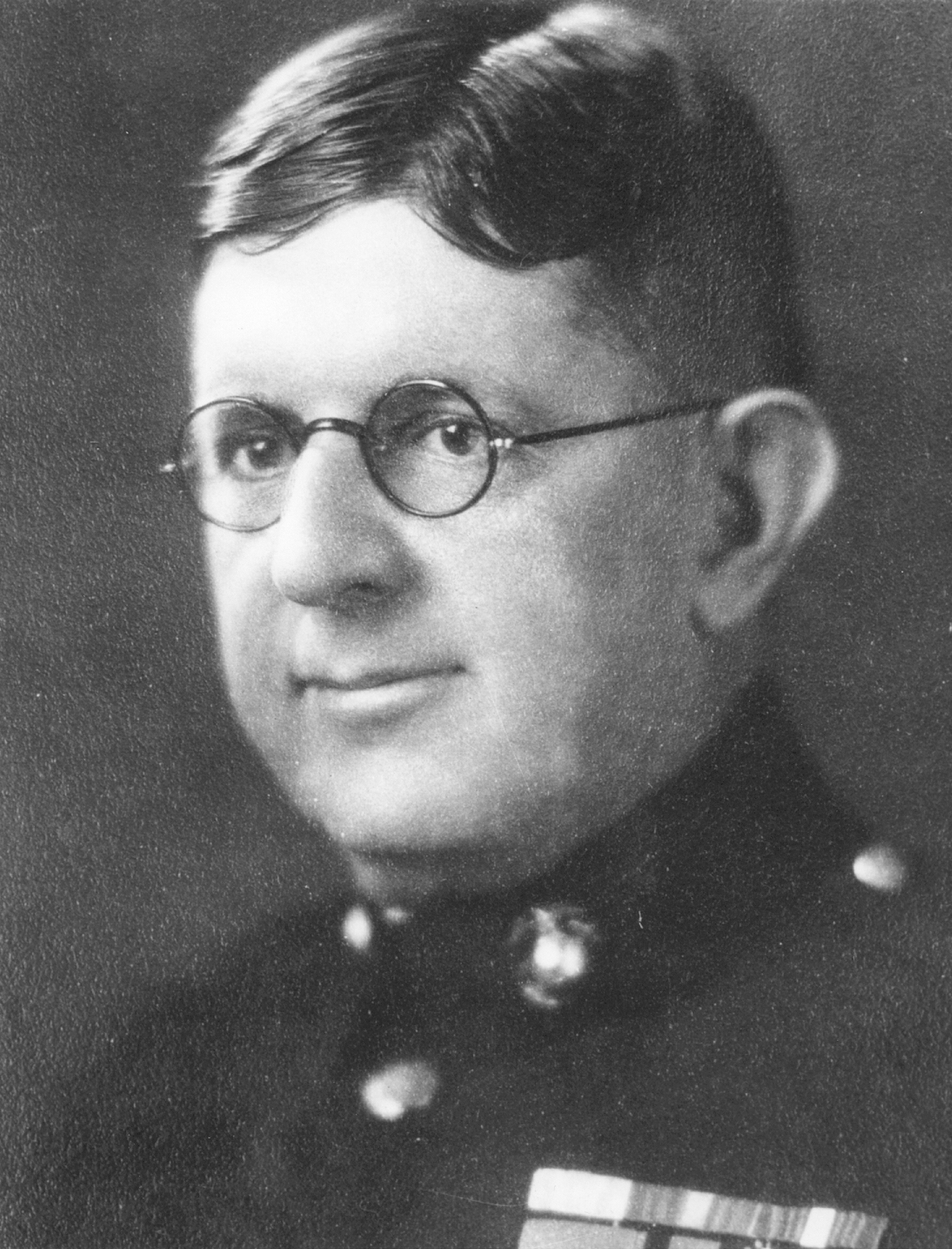
- Major General Randolph C. Berkeley
- Born: January 9, 1875; Staunton, Virginia, US
- Died: January 31, 1960 (aged 85); Beaufort, South Carolina, US
- Burial place: Arlington National Cemetery
- Relatives: Lieutenant General James P. Berkeley (son)
- Military career
- Allegiance: United States
- Branch: United States Marine Corps
- Service years: 1898–1939
- Rank: Major General
- Commands: 11th Regiment
- Conflicts: Occupation of Veracruz; World War I Banana Wars: Occupation of Haiti; Occupation of Nicaragua
- Awards: Medal of Honor; Navy Cross; Navy Distinguished Service Medal

Randolph Carter Berkeley (January 9, 1875 – January 31, 1960) was a major general in United States Marine Corps and Medal of Honor recipient.

Commissioned a Marine second lieutenant during the Spanish–American War, Berkeley completed over 40 years' active duty in the Marine Corps, including service at sea and in the Philippines, Cuba, Panama, China, Haiti, Nicaragua and Guam. In addition to the Medal of Honor, he was awarded the Navy Cross as commander of the 11th Regiment in Nicaragua in 1927, and the Navy Distinguished Service Medal as chief of staff of the 2d Marine Brigade in that country in 1928–29.

As a major Berkeley was commanding the 1st Battalion of the 2d Advanced Base Regiment when he took part in the action which earned him the United States' highest decoration on April 22, 1914. Relations between the United States and the Huerta government of Mexico had been strained for some time, and a landing force of Marines and sailors was ordered ashore at Vera Cruz after a Huerta officer had arrested several U.S. Naval personnel at Tampico. The 2nd Regiment was the first ashore, meeting resistance from Mexican troops about noon on April 21. Major Berkeley was awarded the Medal of Honor for distinguished conduct and leadership in that battle.

== Early life ==
Randolph C. Berkeley was born on January 9, 1875, in Staunton, Virginia, where he attended grade and high school. He graduated from Potomac Academy in Alexandria, Virginia in 1891.

== Military career ==
Berkeley was appointed a Marine second lieutenant on August 8, 1898, for service during the Spanish–American War. He was stationed at the Navy Yard, Washington, D.C., until he was honorably discharged on January 9, 1899. He returned to the corps in April 1899, when he was appointed a first lieutenant. His subsequent promotions included: captain, July 1900; major, October 1910; lieutenant colonel, August 1916; colonel, July 1918; brigadier general, July 1930; and major general on retirement, February 1939.

In addition to his service at posts in the United States, Berkeley served on a variety of assignments at sea and abroad before the action at Vera Cruz, for which he was awarded the Medal of Honor. He served aboard the USS Oregon (BB-3) from October 1899 to March 1901; in the Philippines from April to June 1901; aboard the USS Helena (PG-9) from July 1901 to August 1902; on expeditionary duty in Panama from December 1904 to August 1906; on expeditionary duty in Cuba in September and October 1906; aboard the USS Kentucky (BB-6) as commander of its Marine Detachment from December 1907 to November 1908, and in the Philippines and China from December 1908 to October 1910.

Berkeley took command of the 1st Battalion, 2d Advanced Base Regiment in December 1913, in Pensacola, Florida, and sailed with it for Vera Cruz in March 1914. He returned to the United States in December 1914, and was stationed in Philadelphia, Pennsylvania, until June 1915, when he sailed for Guam to command the Marine Barracks on that island. Returning from Guam in November 1917, he served at the Marine Barracks, New York, New York, and Charleston, South Carolina, during the next two years.

Berkeley was again ordered to expeditionary duty in October 1919, serving for two years with the 1st Provisional Brigade in Haiti. After he returned from that country in November 1921, he served at New York, New York, and Norfolk and Quantico, Virginia. He completed the Field Officers Course at Quantico in August 1925, and a year of study at the Army War College, Washington, D.C., in June 1926, returning from there to Quantico as commander of the 1st Regiment. He served in that capacity for the next two years, except for the period from May to August 1927, when he was commanding the 11th Regiment in Nicaragua.

Berkeley was ordered to Nicaragua again in May 1928, serving there for a year as chief of staff of the 2d Marine Brigade. After his return to the United States in April 1929, he commanded the Marine Barracks at the Norfolk Navy Yard, Portsmouth, Virginia. He served in that capacity until August 1930, when he was ordered to Quantico, Virginia. There he commanded the Marine Corps Schools until November 1931, when he was again ordered to Nicaragua—this time as commander of the 2d Marine Brigade.

Berkeley returned to the United States in January 1933, and from then until May 1936, commanded the Marine barracks in Parris Island, South Carolina. He was then ordered to Marine Corps Headquarters, Washington, D.C., where he was president of the Marine Corps Examining and Retiring Boards until December 1938. He reached the statutory retirement age in January 1939 and was placed on the retired list the following month as a major general.

== Retirement ==
Following his retirement, Berkeley lived in Beaufort and Port Royal, South Carolina, until his death at the U.S. Naval Hospital, Beaufort, South Carolina on January 31, 1960. Major General Berkeley was buried at Arlington National Cemetery, in Arlington, Virginia.

Berkeley was survived by his two sons, Marine Corps officers, Lieutenant General James P. Berkeley and Colonel Randolph Carter Berkeley, Jr. Colonel Berkeley was also buried in Arlington National Cemetery.

== Awards and honors ==
MajGen Berkeley's medals and decorations include:

	Medal of Honor	Navy Cross	
Navy Distinguished Service Medal	Marine Corps Expeditionary Medal	Spanish Campaign Medal	Cuban Pacification Medal
Philippine Campaign Medal	Haitian Campaign Medal (1921)	Mexican Service Medal	World War I Victory Medal
Nicaraguan Campaign Medal (1933)	Nicaraguan Presidential Medal of Merit	Nicaraguan Medal of Distinction	Nicaraguan Medal of Merit

=== Medal of Honor citation ===
BERKELEY, Randolph Carter
Major, U.S. Marine Corps
G.O. Navy Department, No. 177
December 4, 1915

CITATION:

For distinguished conduct in battle during the engagements at VERA CRUZ, on April 21 and 22, 1914, he was noted for his eminent and conspicuous command of his battalion. He participated in the fighting on both days and exhibited courage and skill in leading his men through the action. His cool judgment, courage, and skill in handling his men while encountering and overcoming machine gun and rifle fire down Cinco de Mayo and parallel streets accounts for the small percentage of the losses of Marines under his command.

=== Navy Cross citation ===
Citation:

The President of the United States of America takes pleasure in presenting the Navy Cross to Colonel Randolph Carter Berkeley (MCSN: 0-89), United States Marine Corps, for distinguished service to the government in a duty of responsibility in command of the 11th Regiment in Nicaragua in the spring of 1927 and later Chief of Staff to the Commanding General, during difficult and important pacification problems in connection with an insurrection in that country. Largely through his zeal, tact, energy and loyalty the successful outcome of operations in the difficult Leon and Chinandega areas was accomplished.

=== Namesake ===
The United States Navy guided missile armed destroyer USS Berkeley (DDG-15) is named in honor of Major General Berkeley.

== See also ==
- List of Medal of Honor recipients (Veracruz)
