= USS Mount Vernon =

USS Mount Vernon has been the name of five U.S. Navy ships:

- USS Mount Vernon (1846), a sidewheel gunboat seized by the U.S. Navy in April 1861, renamed USS Mount Washington in November 1861, and sold in 1865.
- USS Mount Vernon (1859), a steamer purchased by the U.S. Navy in April 1861 and sold in 1865.
- USS Mount Vernon (ID-4508), an ocean liner built in Germany as Kronprinzessin Cecilie in 1906, commandeered and commissioned by the U.S. Navy for use as a troop transport as USS Mount Vernon in 1917, and decommissioned in 1919.
- USS Mount Vernon (AP-22), an ocean liner built in the early 1930s as SS Washington, purchased by the U.S. Navy for use as a troop transport in 1941 and commissioned as USS Mount Vernon, and decommissioned in 1946
- USS Mount Vernon (LSD-39), a dock landing ship commissioned in 1972 and decommissioned in 2003.
