= Talisay Landing =

Landing event of Allied forces in the Philippines during World War II

- Part of World War II, Pacific War
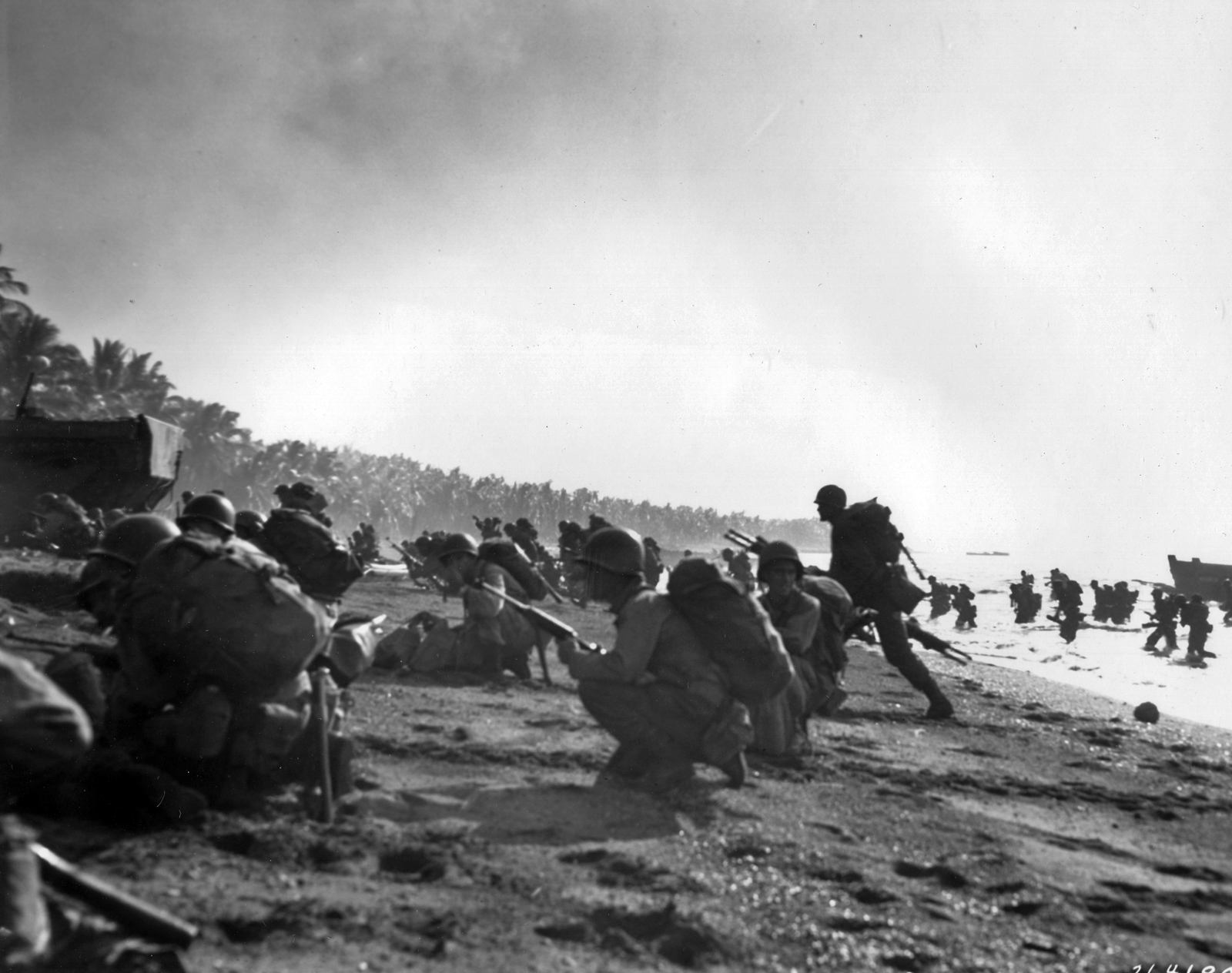
- Allied soldiers landing at the beach in Talisay
Date	26 March 1945
Location	10°14′30.75″N 123°50′56.39″E, Philippines
Result	Allied victory

Belligerents
United States; Philippines	Japan

Commanders and leaders
(United States) William Howard Arnold (United States) Albert Tilden Sprague (Philippines) James M. Cushing	

Talisay Landing was an Allied amphibious landing in the island of Cebu, Philippines on 26 March 1945 during World War II. The landing was part of Operation Victor II, an Allied military campaign to liberate the islands of Cebu, Bohol, and Negros from the Japanese forces.

== Preparation ==
Before the landing, the Cebu guerrilla force of 8,500 men and intelligence network alerted the Allied forces about the plan of the Japanese to scatter landmines in the landing areas to delay the Allied advance. Armed with this knowledge, the landing was preceded by a bombardment of the beaches in Talisay to soften up Japanese positions.

== Conclusion ==
The landing at Talisay paved the way to the liberation of Cebu on 27 March 1945, and the surrender of the Japanese forces on the island on 28 August 1945.

== Recognition ==
In Talisay's beachfront, a set of seven life-sized statues were installed to commemorate the landing event. In 2009, the National Historical Commission of the Philippines installed a historical marker at the beachfront.

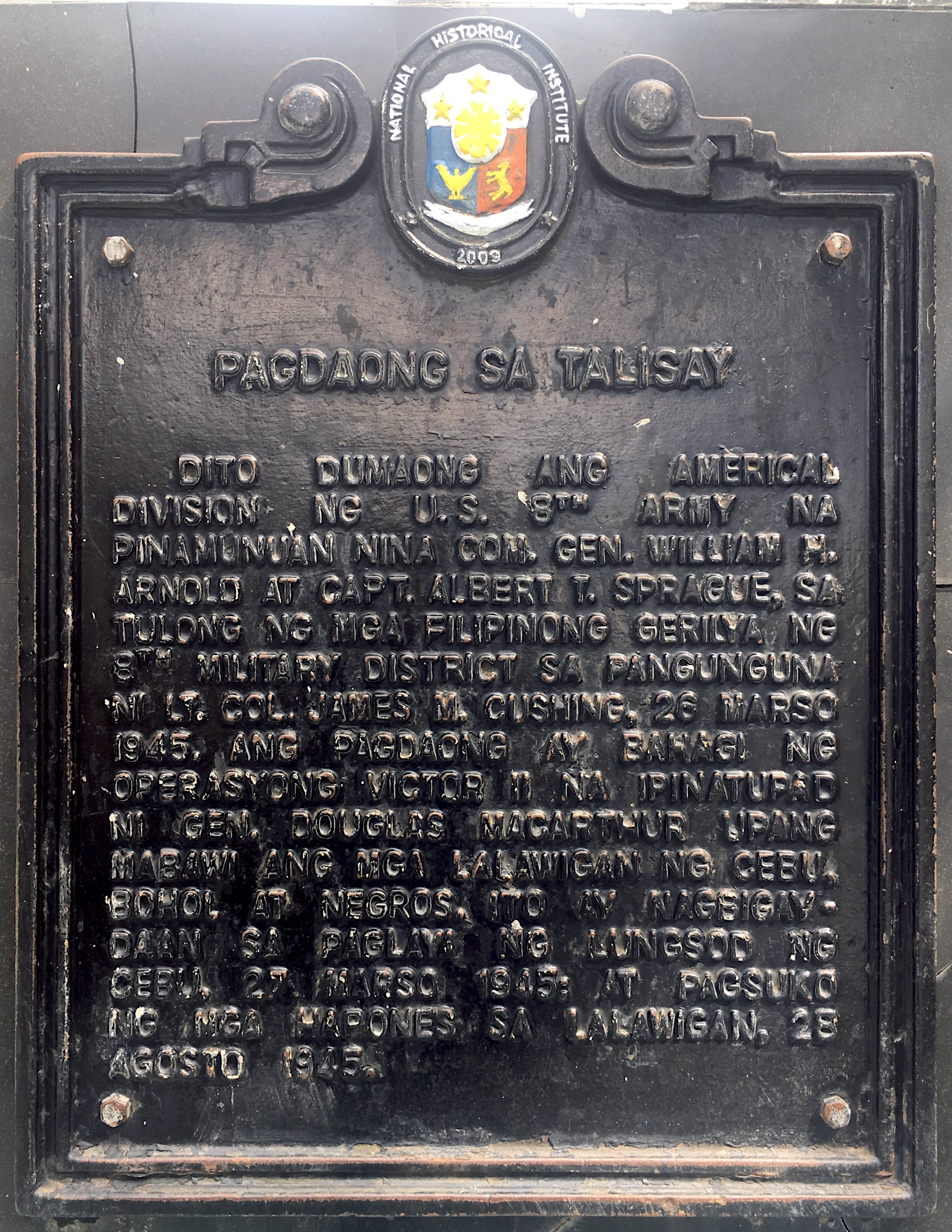
Talisay Landing Historical Marker

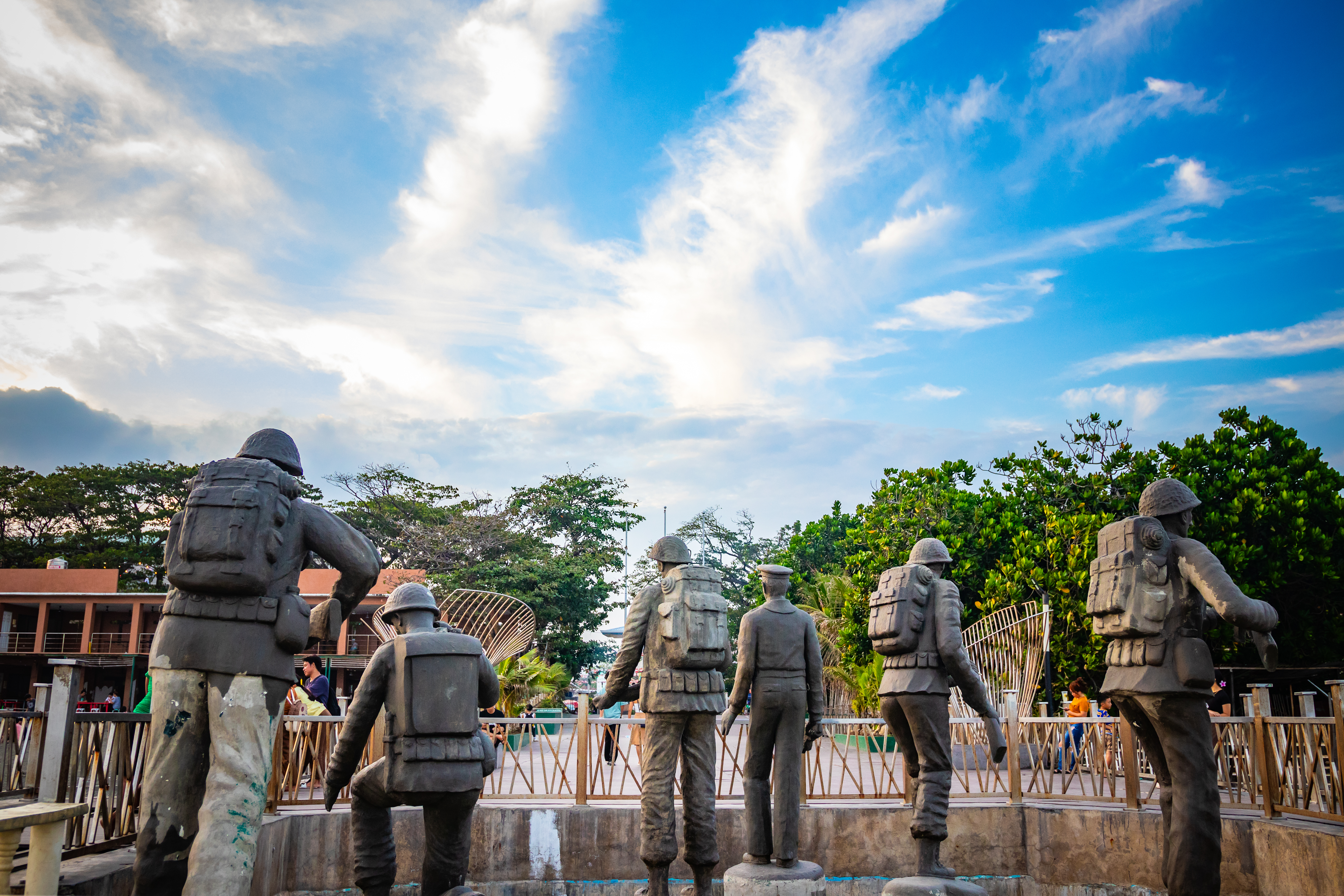
Talisay Landing Park
