= Abel Davis =

American politician and military figure

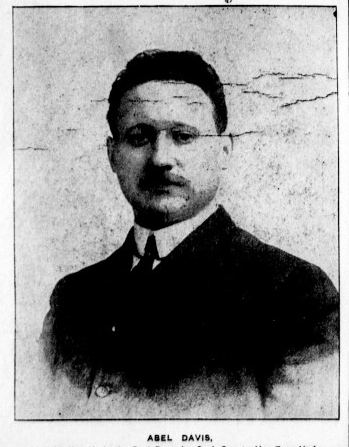
- Abel Davis
- Born: December 26, 1874; Kaunas, Lithuania
- Died: January 7, 1937 (aged 62); Glencoe, Illinois
- Burial place: Rosehill Cemetery
- Spouse: Marjorie née Mayer
- Military career
- Branch: Illinois National Guard
- Rank: Brigadier General
- Awards: Distinguished Service Cross; Distinguished Service Medal

Brigadier General Abel Davis (December 26, 1874 – January 7, 1937) was an officer in the Illinois National Guard. He was regarded as "the second highest ranking Jewish officer in the Illinois National Guard, and one of the highest ranking Jewish officers in the United States Army." During World War I, he commanded the 132nd Infantry Regiment of the 33rd Division. Postwar, Davis commanded the 66th Infantry Brigade.

== Early life ==
Abel Davis was born on December 26, 1874, in the city of Kaunas, Lithuania. His parents were Pesach Davis and Keile née Lipshitz. Abel had eight siblings, four brothers and four sisters.

In January 1891, the Davis family moved to Chicago, Abel was seventeen at the time. His first job in America was as an errand boy in the shipping department of a State Street department store.

== Spanish–American War ==
As a teenager, he fought in the Spanish–American War. Davis enlisted in the 1st Illinois Volunteer Infantry based out of Chicago. He served as a private in Company E of the regiment until the end of the war.

== Interwar period ==
After the Spanish–American War, Davis returned to Chicago and worked in the same State Street department store as an errand boy in the executive department. While working he studied law as night. In 1901, he received his law degree from Northwestern University.

On May 13, 1902, Davis was admitted to the Illinois State Bar Association. In November 1902 he was elected to the Illinois House of Representatives from the 23rd District as a Republican and served in 1903 and 1904. Davis continued his political career in November 1904 when he was elected Cook County Recorder of Deeds on the Republican ticket. After his second term as Recorder, Davis retired from elected office and served as the Vice President of the Chicago Title and Trust Company. During this time, Davis continued to serve in the Illinois National Guard and rose through the ranks. He also maintained a private law practice.

In 1916, Major Davis and the First Infantry patrolled along the Mexico and U.S. border. They engaged in multiple skirmishes with Pancho Villa's forces.

=== Lightning incident ===
On July 6, 1912, Major Davis and a group of soldiers were struck by lightning at Camp Lincoln outside of Springfield, Illinois. A Chicago Tribune article states Davis was the most seriously injured and was reported to be in critical condition with his tongue blackened and the soles of his feet burned. All men involved made a full recovery.

== World War I ==
In World War I, Colonel Davis commanded the 132nd U.S. Infantry of Illinois. He became a highly decorated officer for his bravery in battle.

The group under Davis' command consisted of a single battalion of 8-inch howitzers of the 44th Regiment Colonial Army Corps and the 2nd Battalion of the 123rd Field Artillery (155-millimeter howitzers). On May 16, 1918, the 132nd U.S. Infantry regiment had sailed on the "Mount Vernon" troop transport from Hoboken, New Jersey. They arrived at Brest, France between May 23 and May 30 under Davis' command. While in France, they served alongside the British 173rd and 174th brigades as well as the British 4th army. They trained with both British and Australian forces before receiving their "baptism of fire" in the Battle of Hamel. While in France, the 132nd Infantry under Davis' command had a mission to break through the enemy positions in front of and in the Bois de Forges and organize the Verdun–Sedan road 400 meters north of the Bois de Forges. The 131st was assembled in the northern part of the Bois de Forges and placed under Davis' command along with the 132nd Infantry. They had to cross the River Consenvoye the next day.

In October 1918, Colonel Davis' unit and the 17th French Army Corps were attacked at St. Hilaire three days before the armistice. For repulsing the enemy attack, Davis was awarded the Distinguished Service Cross and the Distinguished Service Medal.

== After World War I ==
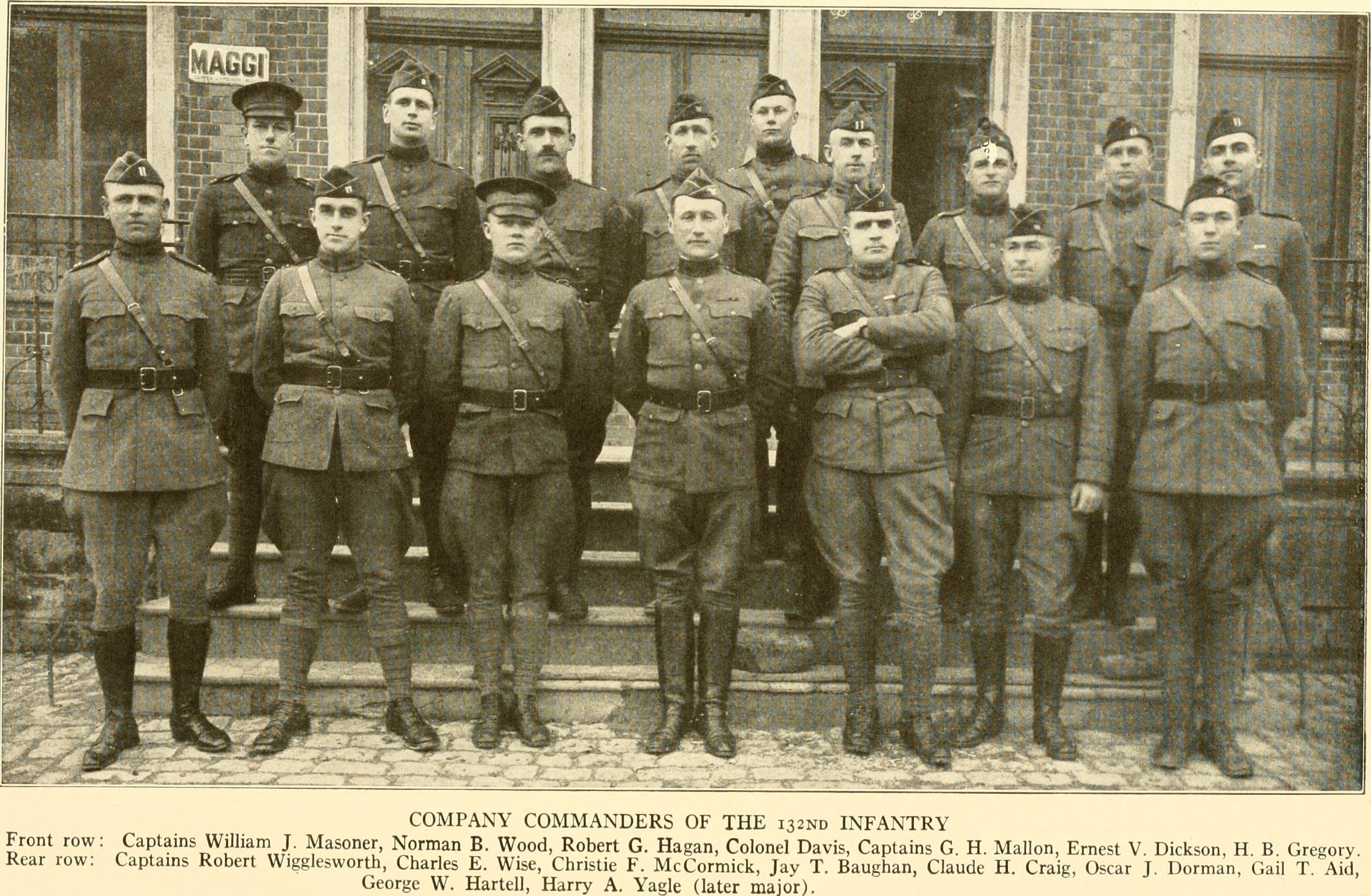
Company commanders of the 132nd Infantry Regiment, 1920. Colonel Davis is stood in the center of the front row.

He participated in the founding of the American Legion with Milton J. Foreman in Paris.

After the war ended, Davis became a Brigadier General in command of the 66th Infantry Brigade of the Illinois National Guard.

On December 28, 1922, Davis married Marjorie née Mayer. They had three children together: Florence, Abel Jr., and Jean.

In 1930, Davis resigned his command with the Illinois National Guard. In 1931, Davis served as chairman of the Board of The Chicago Title and Trust Company. He held this position until his death. From 1932 to 1933, he served as a Trustee of the Century of Progress Exposition in Chicago. In 1935, Davis retired from the Illinois National Guard with a rank of Major General.

== Charity work ==
In 1906, Davis helped in the organization of the Young Men's Jewish Charities of Chicago. In 1912, he became a director for the Chicago Jewish Charities.

After World War I ended, he became involved in "Chicago Jewish charitable affairs" and oversaw many war relief drives. At 52, he became the vice-president of the Chicago Title and Trust Company. By 1919, "he served as general chairman of the nonsectarian Joint Distribution Committee's War Relief Drive." He was the "chairman of the 1926 and 1927 Chicago conferences of the United Jewish Campaign."

Additionally, he was a member of the John Crerar Library board from 1928 to 1937.

== Awards and medals ==
Davis' World War I record earned him a number of prestigious medals such as the Distinguished Service Cross, the Distinguished Service Medal, and the Cross of the French Legion of Honor. His Distinguished Service Cross citation states "Disregarding the heavy shell and machine-gun fire, Colonel Davis personally assumed command and by his fearless leadership and courage the enemy was driven back." His Distinguished Service Medal also states "In the organization and training of his regiment he brought it to a notably high state of efficiency and morale with great thoroughness and in a remarkably short time. Afterward he handled it in all its actions against the enemy with marked success, displaying courage, resourcefulness, tactical skill, and military leadership of the highest order."

== Death and legacy ==
On January 7, 1937, Davis died of pneumonia at the age of 62. He was buried with full military honors at Rosehill Cemetery.

His portrait by Alfred Bendiner is in the National Gallery of Art.
