= 33rd Infantry Division (United States) =

- Shoulder sleeve insignia
- Active: 1917 – 1919; 1923 – 1946; 1946 – 1968
- Country: United States
- Branch: United States Army
- Type: Infantry
- Size: Division
- Nicknames: "Illinois Division" "Prairie Division" "Golden Cross Division"
- Engagements: World War I: Somme Offensive; Meuse-Argonne; World War II: New Guinea; Luzon
- Decorations: Presidential Unit Citation (6)

Insignia
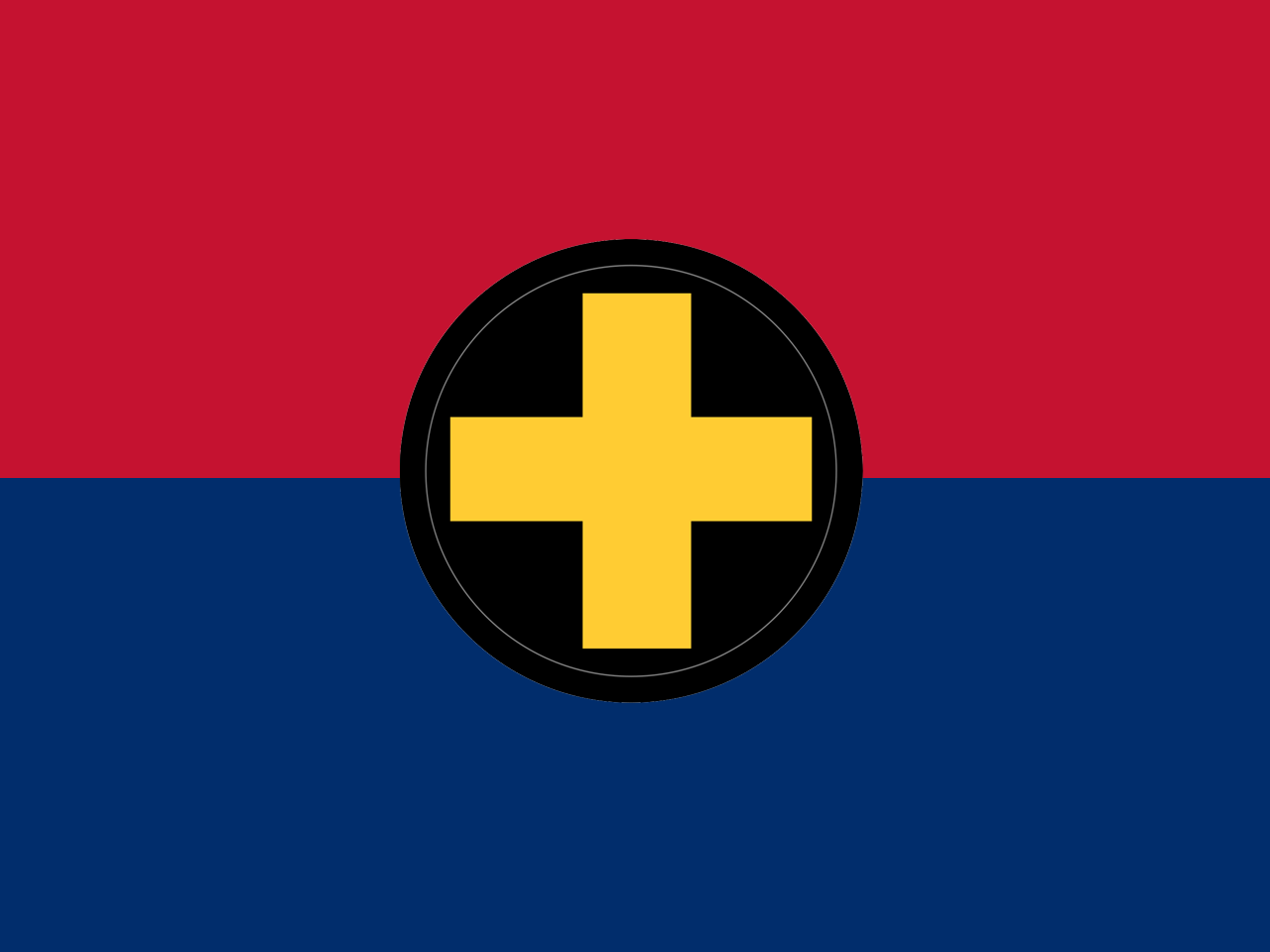
- Flag of the United States Army 33rd Infantry Division

The 33rd Infantry Division was a formation of the U.S. Army National Guard between 1917 and 1968. Originally formed for service during World War I, the division fought along the Western Front during the Battle of Amiens, the Battle of Hamel, the Meuse-Argonne Offensive, at the Second Battle of the Somme, and at the Battle of Saint-Mihiel. It was re-formed during the inter-war period, and then later activated for service during World War II, seeing action against the Imperial Japanese Army in the Pacific. In the post war era, the division was reconstituted as an all-Illinois National Guard division. In the late 1960s, the division was reduced to a brigade-sized formation, and its lineage is currently perpetuated by the 33rd Infantry Brigade Combat Team.

== History ==
=== World War I ===
- Activated: July 1917 (National Guard Division from Illinois) at Camp Logan, Illinois
- Overseas: May 1918.
- Major operations: Le Hamel (four companies), Meuse-Argonne Offensive, Somme offensive, and Saint-Mihiel
- Casualties: Total – 6,864 (KIA – 691, WIA − 6,173).
- Commanders: Brig. Gen. Henry D. Todd Jr. (19 September 1917), Maj. Gen. George Bell Jr. (7 December 1917).
- Returned to U.S. and inactivated: May 1919 at Camp Grant, Illinois
- Medal of Honor:
  - Sergeant Willie Sandlin,
  - Private Clayton K. Slack,
  - Corporal Thomas A. Pope.
  - Sergeant Sydney Gumpertz
  - Corporal Jake Allex
  - First Sergeant Johannes S. Anderson
  - Sergeant Ralyn M. Hill
  - Corporal Berger Loman

==== Combat chronicle ====
The 33rd Division served in World War I and beyond. The division was trained at Camp Logan in Houston, Texas as part of the National state guard in Illinois. The first unit went to France in 1918. The first unit to go into France was the 108th Engineers, under Colonel Henry A. Allen.

During World War I, the 33rd Division's officers included Second Lieutenant John Allan Wyeth, who has been called the only American poet of the Great War who can stand up to comparison with British war poets Siegfried Sassoon and Wilfred Owen. Wyeth later immortalized his war experiences with the 33rd U.S. Division in the 1928 sonnet sequence This Man's Army: A War in Fifty-Odd Sonnets.

On 20 and 21 June the division went to the Amiens sector, where there was expected to be a major German attack. The division was trained by British Army and Commonwealth soldiers – in particular the Australian Corps – and was part of some of their operations.

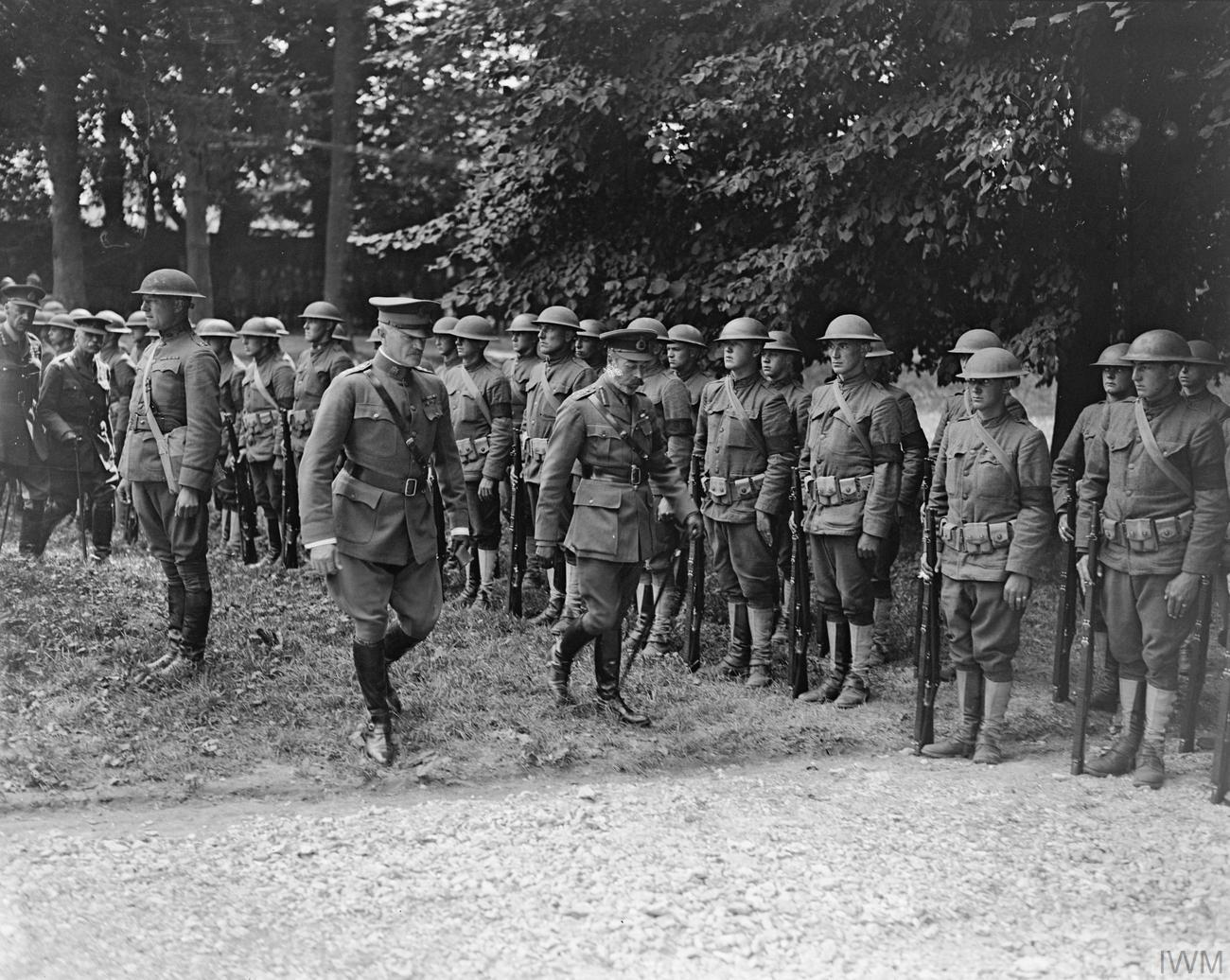
British King George V and General John J. Pershing inspecting men from every unit of the U.S. 33rd Division which took part in the fighting at Hamel on 4 July and Chipilly on 8 August. Molliens, 12 August 1918.

The first major battle in which elements of the 33rd Division took part was the Battle of Hamel on 4 July. Individual platoons from four companies from the 131st Infantry and 132nd Infantry were distributed among Australian battalions, to gain combat experience. This, however, occurred without official approval as there was controversy regarding the battlefield command of US troops by junior officers from other countries. Thus, while Hamel was a relatively minor battle by the standards of World War I, it was historically significant as the first occasion on which US Army personnel had fought alongside British Empire forces, and demonstrated that the previously inexperienced American troops could play an effective role in the war. The battle was also historically significant for the use of innovative assault tactics, devised by the Australian General John Monash, were demonstrated.

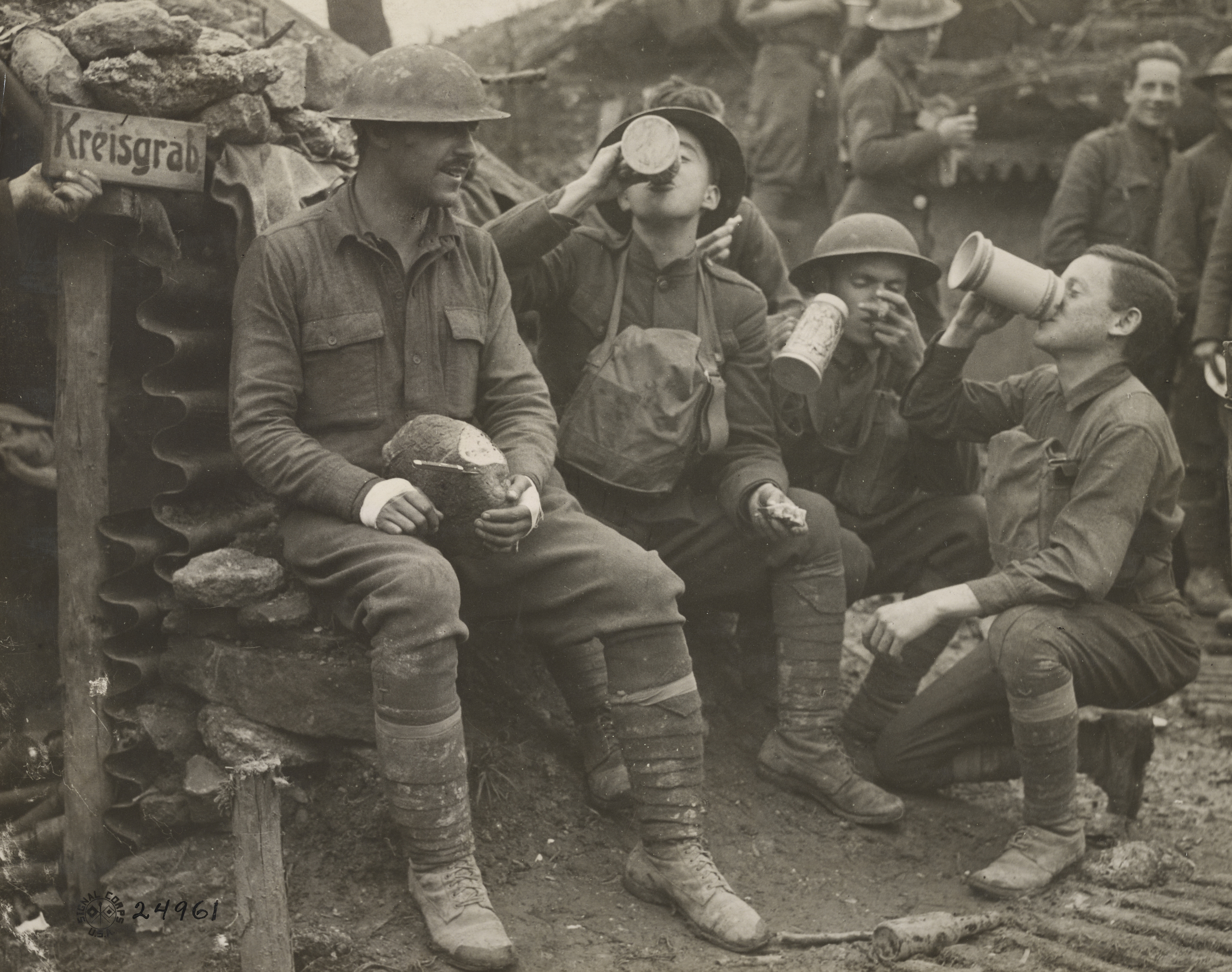
A pause for celebration. Doughboys of the 33rd Division liberate some German refreshments on the Meuse–Argonne front, October 1918.

The 33rd Division was in reserve behind the British Fourth Army at the opening of the August offensive for emergencies only. With the British III Corps attack stalling at Chipilly Ridge during the Battle of Amiens, the 131st Regiment of the 33rd Division was sent to assist on 9 August, which it did with distinction. The following day the Regiment was attached to the 4th Australian Division and remained there until 12 August. From 12 August until 20 August it was combined with the 13th Australian Brigade in what was called the Liaison Force commanded by Brigadier General E. A. Wisdom. This was designed to hold the front from the Somme to the Bray-Sur-Somme to Corbie road to relieve the 4th Australian Division from the operation. After this it returned to the 33rd US Division.

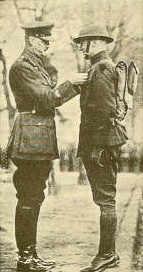
British Brigadier-General Cyril Wagstaff confers the Military Cross upon First Lieutenant George W. Sherwood of the 131st Infantry. (Larochette, 1919-01-20)

On 23 August, the division was moved to the Toul sector. The 33rd Division fought in the Meuse-Argonne Campaign from 26 September 1918 to the end of the battle on 10 November 1918. The last mission in which the 33rd Division took part was on 27 December 1918.

In total, from the 33rd arriving in France to the German armistice on 11 November 1918, the division captured 13 units of heavy artillery and 87 pieces of light artillery. Also, they captured 460 machine guns and 430 light guns. In total, the entire division gained 40,300 meters of land in World War I. The 33rd Division was the only unit in the war to have machine gun barrage enemy nests while infantry turned the position. In total, the 33rd Division received 215 American decorations, 56 British decorations, and various others.

As result of its World War I service, the division remains the only US Army division that has fought as part of British Army and French Army corps.

==== Order of battle ====
In 1918, the 33rd Division was organized as follows:

- Headquarters, 33rd Division
- 65th Infantry Brigade
  - 129th Infantry Regiment
  - 130th Infantry Regiment
  - 123rd Machine Gun Battalion
- 66th Infantry Brigade
  - 131st Infantry Regiment
  - 132nd Infantry Regiment
  - 124th Machine Gun Battalion
- 58th Field Artillery Brigade
  - 122nd Field Artillery Regiment (75mm)
  - 123rd Field Artillery Regiment (155mm)
  - 124th Field Artillery Regiment (75mm)
  - 108th Trench Mortar Battery
- 122nd Machine Gun Battalion
- 108th Engineer Regiment
- 108th Field Signal Battalion
- Headquarters Troop, 33rd Division
- 108th Train Headquarters & Military Police
  - 108th Ammunition Train
  - 108th Supply Train
  - 108th Engineer Train
  - 108th Sanitary Train
    - 129th, 130th, 131st, and 132nd Ambulance Companies and Field Hospitals

=== Interwar period ===
The 33rd Division headquarters arrived at Hoboken, New Jersey, aboard the USS Mount Vernon on 17 May 1919 after 12 months of overseas service and was demobilized on 6 June 1919 at Camp Grant. In accordance with the National Defense Act of 1920, the division was allotted to the state of Illinois and assigned to the VI Corps in 1921. The division headquarters was reorganized and federally recognized on 13 December 1923 at 115 East Ontario Street, in Chicago. Most elements of the division were concentrated in the northern part of the state in and around Chicago. Each company of the 108th Engineer Regiment was sponsored by a major Illinois industrial or transportation concern: Company A by the Peoples Gas, Light, and Coke Company, Company B by Commonwealth Edison, Company C by the Elevated Railroad, Company D by the Illinois Central Railroad, Company E by the International Harvester Company, and Company F by the Chicago, Milwaukee, St. Paul and Pacific Railroad. Regular Army officers were detailed to act as instructors for the 33rd, supervising National Guard officers who conducted the usual training. One of these officers was Colonel George C. Marshall, who served as head instructor for the 33rd Division from 1933 to 1936.

The designated mobilization training center for the “Prairie Division” was initially Camp Grant, where much of the division’s training activities occurred between the wars. The mobilization training center for the division was changed to Fort Huachuca, Arizona, in the 1939 Protective Mobilization Plan. The division, less the 58th Field Artillery Brigade, conducted summer camp most years at Camp Grant from 1922 to 1939; the 58th Field Artillery Brigade conducted most of its camps in the 1920s at Camp McCoy, Wisconsin, and Camp Knox, Kentucky, so that its subordinate battalions could conduct live-fire training at the ranges located there. For at least one year, in 1937, the division’s subordinate units trained over 170 company-grade officers of the 86th Division at Camp Grant and Camp McCoy. The division staff usually conducted command post exercises (CPXs) and staff training concurrent with the subordinate unit camps. However, in May 1932 the staff participated in the Sixth Corps Area CPX held at Camp Custer, Michigan, and in the corps area CPX held in Chicago in May 1936. Additionally, the division staff participated in the Second Army CPX in August 1938 held at Fort Knox. The division’s staff was generally acknowledged as one of the best in the National Guard and performed well in these CPXs. Much of the staff’s efficiency was attributed to George C. Marshall. For the 1936 camp, the division participated in the Sixth Corps Area phase of the Second Army maneuvers at Camp Custer. During that maneuver, the 33rd Division operated against the 32nd Division in a force-on-force exercise. The “Prairie Division” also participated in the Second Army maneuvers in 1940 held at Camp McCoy. The division was relieved from the VI Corps on 30 December 1940 and assigned to the VII Corps.

==== Commanders ====
- Major General Milton J. Foreman (13 December 1923 – 27 January 1927)
- Brigadier General Abel Davis (27 January–16 February 1927) (ad interim)
- Major General Roy D. Keehn (16 February 1927–May 1940)
- Major General Samuel T. Lawton (16 May 1940 – 30 April 1942)

=== World War II ===
==== WWII division organization ====
===== Square division =====
On 5 March 1941, the 33rd Division was inducted into federal service at home stations and then assembled at Camp Forrest in Tennessee. At the time the division still retained its World War I square organization and consisted of the following units.

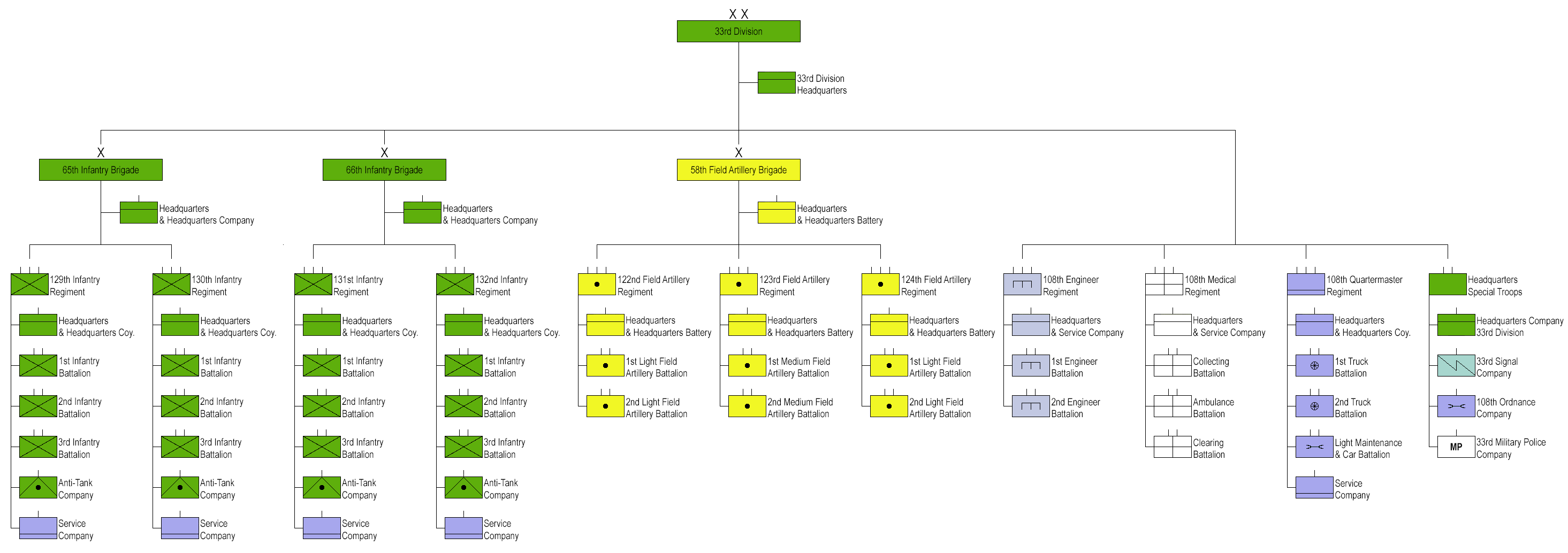
33rd Division square organization (click to enlarge)

- 33rd Division, in Chicago (IL)
  - 33rd Division Headquarters
  - 65th Infantry Brigade, in Pontiac (IL)
    - Headquarters and Headquarters Company, in Pontiac (IL)
    - 129th Infantry Regiment, in Sycamore (IL)
      - Headquarters and Headquarters Company
      - 3× Infantry battalions
        - each battalion consists of: 1× Headquarters and Headquarters Detachment, 3× Rifle companies, 1× Weapons Company
      - Anti-Tank Company (M3 37mm Anti-Tank guns)
      - Service Company
    - 130th Infantry Regiment, in Delavan (IL)
      - same organization as 129th Infantry Regiment
  - 66th Infantry Brigade, in Chicago (IL)
    - Headquarters and Headquarters Company, in Oak Park (IL)
    - 131st Infantry Regiment, in Chicago (IL)
      - same organization as 129th Infantry Regiment
    - 132nd Infantry Regiment, in Chicago (IL)
      - same organization as 129th Infantry Regiment
  - 58th Field Artillery Brigade, in Chicago (IL)
    - Headquarters and Headquarters Battery, in Chicago (IL)
    - 122nd Field Artillery Regiment, in Chicago (IL)
      - Headquarters and Headquarters Battery
      - 2× Light Field Artillery battalions
        - Headquarters and Headquarters Battery
        - 3× Howitzer batteries (M1897 75mm field guns), replaced by M2 105mm towed howitzers in 1941)
        - Service Battery
    - 123rd Field Artillery Regiment, in Chicago (IL)
      - Headquarters and Headquarters Battery
      - 2× Medium Field Artillery battalions
        - Headquarters and Headquarters Battery
        - 3× Howitzer batteries (M1918 155mm towed howitzers, replaced by M1 155mm towed howitzers in 1941)
        - Anti-Tank Battery (M1897 75mm anti-tank guns)
        - Service Battery
    - 124th Field Artillery Regiment, in Monmouth (IL)
      - same organization as 122nd Field Artillery Regiment
  - 108th Engineer Regiment, in Chicago (IL)
    - Headquarters and Headquarters and Service Company
    - 2× Engineer battalions
      - each battalion consists of: 1× Headquarters, 3× Engineer companies
  - 108th Medical Regiment, in Chicago (IL)
    - Headquarters and Headquarters and Service Company
    - Collecting Battalion
      - battalion consists of: 1× Headquarters, 3× Collecting companies
    - Ambulance Battalion
      - battalion consists of: 1× Headquarters, 3× Ambulance companies
    - Clearing Battalion
      - battalion consists of: 1× Headquarters, 3× Clearing companies
  - 108th Quartermaster Regiment, in Chicago (IL)
    - Headquarters and Headquarters Company
    - 2× Truck battalions
      - each battalion consists of: 1× Headquarters, 2× Truck companies
    - Light Maintenance and Car Battalion
      - battalion consists of: 1× Headquarters, 1× Light Maintenance Company, 1× Car Company
    - Service Company
  - Headquarters, Special Troops, in Chicago (IL)
    - Headquarters Company, 33rd Division, in Chicago (IL)
    - 33rd Signal Company, in Chicago (IL)
    - 108th Ordnance Company, in Chicago (IL)
    - 33rd Military Police Company, in Chicago (IL)

In April 1941, Illinois draftees sent from Camp Grant and Fort Sheridan arrived to bring the 33rd Division to full strength. After completing basic training, the division was tested by VII Corps officials before being allowed to progress; the division achieved the best aggregate score of the VII Corps' three infantry divisions on these tests, performing better than either the 27th or 35th Divisions. The 33rd Division and the rest of the VII Corps subsequently participated in the major Louisiana Maneuvers held in southern Arkansas and northern Louisiana in August and September, after which the division returned to Camp Forrest. After the Japanese attack on Pearl Harbor, Hawaii, on 7 December 1941, the 33rd Infantry Division was dispersed to guard major industrial plants, dams, and railroads in Alabama and Tennessee, being recalled to Camp Forrest after one month.

===== Triangular division =====
On 14 January 1942, the 132nd Infantry Regiment was detached from the division for service in New Caledonia with Task Force 6814, which would eventually become the Americal Division. On 21 February 1942, as a part of an Army-wide reorganization of National Guard divisions, the 33rd Division was reorganized as a triangular division. The division's two brigade headquarters were disbanded in favor of a structure containing three separate regimental commands reporting directly to the division headquarters, as well as four field artillery battalions under a division artillery headquarters, with the medical, and quartermaster regiments also reduced to battalions. The 131st Infantry Regiment was detached for non-divisional service in the continental United States and sent to Fort Brady, near Sault Ste. Marie, Michigan, to guard the Soo Locks. To maintain the division with three regiments, the 136th Infantry Regiment, originally a Minnesota National Guard unit inactive during the interwar period, was reconstituted in the Army of the United States with new recruits and personnel transferred from elsewhere in the division, and assigned to the division on 1 April 1942. The 108th Engineer Regiment was broken up and the headquarters, Headquarters and Service Company, and Companies A, B, and C became the 108th Engineer Combat Battalion, which remained with the division. The 1st Battalion's headquarters was inactivated on 21 February 1942, while the 2nd Battalion became the 181st Engineer Battalion (Heavy Pontoon). With the reorganization the division was renamed 33rd Infantry Division. Afterwards the 33rd Infantry Division was composed of the following units:

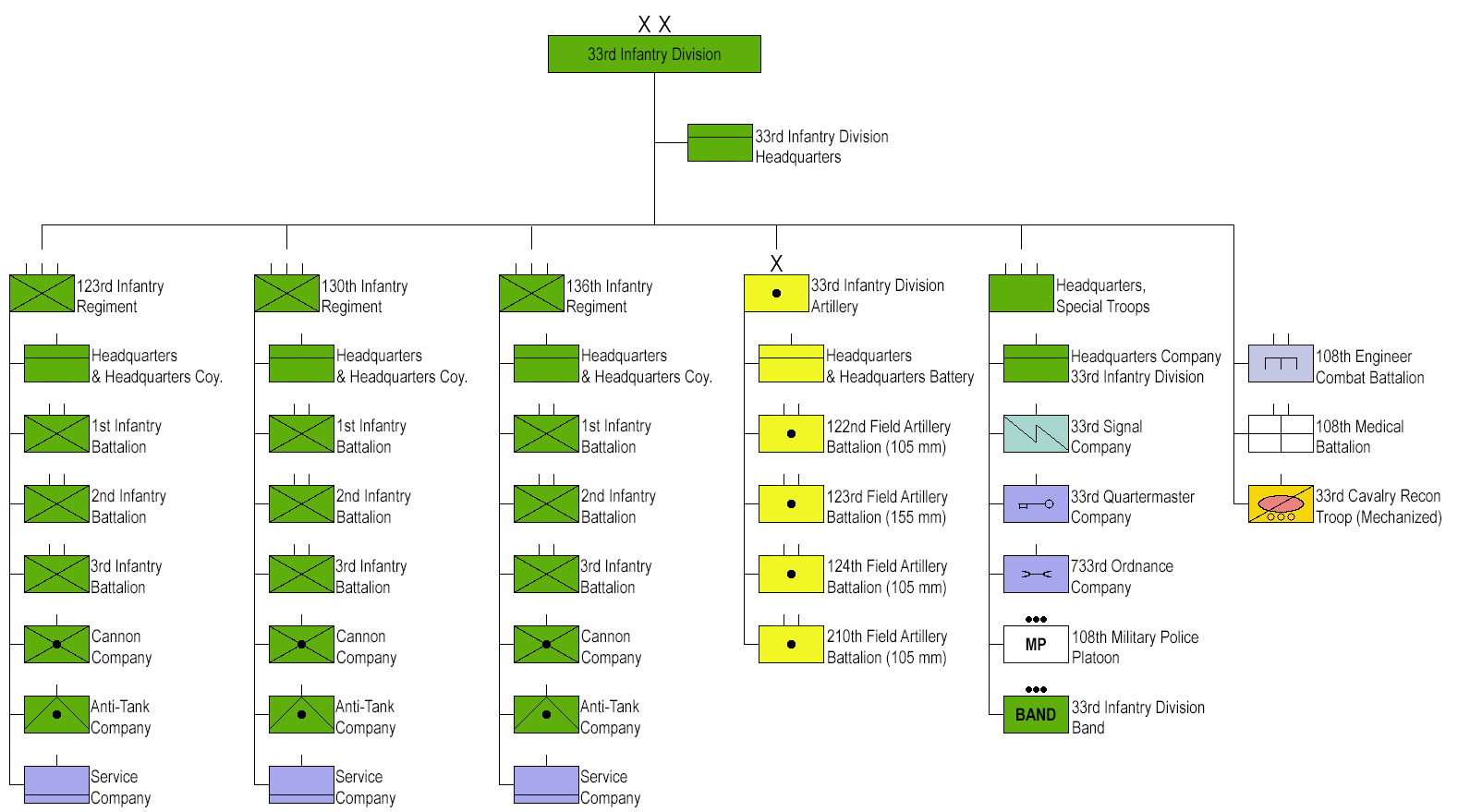
33rd Infantry Division triangular organization (click to enlarge)

- 33rd Infantry Division
  - 33rd Infantry Division Headquarters
  - 33rd Cavalry Reconnaissance Troop (Mechanized) (M3 scout cars and then M8 Greyhound armored cars)
  - 123rd Infantry Regiment (assigned to the division on 28 September 1942)
    - Headquarters and Headquarters Company
    - 3× Infantry battalions
      - each battalion consists of: 1× Headquarters and Headquarters Company, 3× Rifle companies, 1× Heavy Weapons Company
    - Cannon Company (T12 Gun Motor Carriages and T19 Howitzer Motor Carriages, later replaced by either M3 105mm towed howitzers or M7 Priest self propelled howitzers)
    - Anti-Tank Company (M3 37mm anti-tank guns, which were replaced by 1944 with M1 57mm anti-tank guns)
    - Service Company
  - 129th Infantry Regiment (relieved from assignment to the 33rd Infantry Division and assigned to the 37th Infantry Division on 31 July 1942)
    - same organization as 123rd Infantry Regiment
  - 130th Infantry Regiment
    - same organization as 123rd Infantry Regiment
  - 136th Infantry Regiment (assigned to the division on 1 April 1942)
    - same organization as 123rd Infantry Regiment
  - 33rd Infantry Division Artillery
    - Headquarters and Headquarters Battery
    - 122nd Field Artillery Battalion
      - Headquarters and Headquarters Battery
      - 3× Batteries (M2 105mm towed howitzers)
      - Service Battery
    - 123rd Field Artillery Battalion
      - Headquarters and Headquarters Battery
      - 3× Batteries (M1 155mm towed howitzers)
      - Service Battery
    - 124th Field Artillery Battalion
      - same organization as 122nd Field Artillery Battalion
    - 210th Field Artillery Battalion
      - same organization as 122nd Field Artillery Battalion
  - Headquarters Special Troops
    - Headquarters Company, 33rd Infantry Division
    - 33rd Signal Company
    - 33rd Quartermaster Company
    - 733rd Ordnance Light Maintenance Company
    - 108th Military Police Platoon
    - 33rd Infantry Division Band (attached)
  - 33rd Quartermaster Battalion (Between September and November 1942 Quartermaster battalions were disbanded and their platoons used to form a Quartermaster Company and an Ordnance Company, which were both assigned to Headquarters Special Troops)
    - Headquarters and Headquarters Company (includes a service platoon and a maintenance platoon)
    - Truck Company
  - 108th Engineer Combat Battalion
    - Headquarters and Headquarters and Service Company
    - 3× Engineer combat companies
  - 108th Medical Battalion
    - Headquarters and Headquarters Detachment
    - 3× Collecting companies
    - Clearing Company

In 1942, three National Guard divisions, the 30th, 31st, and 33rd, became "virtual pools" for the Army Service Forces in the activation of new service units. In July 1942, 2,000 personnel from all arms and services were taken from the 33rd Infantry Division and sent to Camp Edwards, Massachusetts, to form the nucleus of the Engineer Amphibian Command and the 1st, 2nd, and 3rd Engineer Special Brigades that were being activated there.

On 31 July 1942, the regimental headquarters, auxiliary troops, and the 2nd and 3rd Battalions of the 129th Infantry were detached from the 33rd Infantry Division and were sent as a task force to the Pacific Theater. The regiment was later assigned to the 37th Infantry Division. The 1st Battalion remained behind to cadre a new regiment. As a result of these rapid personnel transfers. the division declined from a strength of 13,200 to only 8,400 in August 1942. The division was then promised immunity from further stripping, and was given priority on the receipt of trained filler replacements. The 123rd Infantry Regiment (unrelated in lineage to an earlier Alabama National Guard formation of the same designation that saw service in World War I as a part of the 31st Division) was constituted in the Army of the United States on 24 August 1942 and assigned to the division on 28 September.

In September, the 33rd Infantry Division was transferred to Fort Lewis, Washington and assigned to the IX Corps. In October, November, and December, filler replacements arrived at Fort Lewis to bring the 33rd Infantry Division to full strength once again. From March to June 1943, the division participated in maneuvers in the Desert Training Center, located in the Mojave Desert in Arizona and California. After the maneuvers, the 33rd Infantry Division received its port call and shipped out to Camp Stoneman, near Pittsburg, California.

==== Pacific Theater ====
The 33rd Infantry Division arrived in Hawaii on 12 July 1943. While guarding installations, it received training in jungle warfare. On 11 May 1944, it arrived in New Guinea where it received additional training. The 123rd Infantry Regiment arrived at Maffin Bay on 1 September, to provide perimeter defense around the Wakde Airdrome and in the Toem–Sarmi sector. The 123rd was relieved on 26 January 1945. Elements of the 33rd arrived at Morotai, on 18 December 1944 and landings were made on the west coast of the island on 22 December, without opposition and defensive perimeters were established. Aggressive patrols were sent out which encountered scattered resistance. The 33rd then landed at Lingayen Gulf, on Luzon, on 10 February 1945, and relieved the 43rd Infantry Division in the Damortis–Rosario Pozorrubio area, over the period 13–15 February. The division drove into the Caraballo Mountains on 19 February, toward its objective, Baguio, the summer capital of the Philippines and the headquarters of General Tomoyuki Yamashita.

Fighting against a fanatical enemy entrenched in the hills, the 33rd took Aringay on 7 March, Mount Calugong on 8 April, and Mount Mirador on 25 April. Baguio and Camp John Hay fell on 26 April, under the concerted attack of the 33rd and the 37th Infantry Divisions. Manuel Roxas, later President of the Philippines, was freed during the capture of Baguio, which was liberated by the 33rd and Filipino soldiers of the 66th Infantry Regiment, Philippine Commonwealth Army, USAFIP-NL on 27 April. After mopping up isolated pockets of Japanese troops, the division captured the San Nicholas–Tebbo–Itogon route on 12 May. All elements went to rest and rehabilitation areas on 30 June 1945. The division landed on Honshū Island, Japan, on 25 September, and then performed occupation duties until it was deactivated in early 1946.

==== Casualties ====
- Total battle casualties: 2,426
- Killed in action: 396
- Wounded in action: 2,024
- Missing in action: 5
- Prisoner of war: 1

==== Statistics ====
- Called into federal service: 5 March 1941
- Trained at Camp Essex in California in 1943.
- Overseas: 7 July 1943.
- Campaigns: New Guinea, Luzon.
- Presidential Unit Citation: 6.
- Awards: Medal of Honor – 3; Distinguished Service Cross – 31; Distinguished Service Medal – 2; Silver Star – 470; Legion of Merit – 34; Soldier's Medal – 49; Bronze Star Medal – 2,251; Air Medal – 36.
- Commanders: Maj. Gen. Samuel T. Lawton (March 1941 – May 1942), Maj. Gen. Frank Mahin (May–July 1942), Maj. Gen. John Millikin (August 1942 – September 1943), Maj. Gen. Percy W. Clarkson (October 1943 – November 1945); Brig. Gen. Winfred G. Skelton (November 1945 to inactivation).
- Inactivated: 3 February 1946 in Japan.

=== Post World War II ===
The 33rd Infantry Division was reformed as an all-Illinois National Guard division on 7 November 1946. However, some of its former units were assigned to the 44th Infantry Division, which was also reorganized in the postwar Guard structure as an Illinois-based division.

By 1954, the division's infantry and artillery units included the 129th, 130th, and 131st Infantry Regiments, and the 122nd, 123rd, 124th, and 210th Field Artillery Battalions. A number of National Guard divisions were deactivated in 1968, including the 33rd Infantry Division on 1 February 1968. However, in its place the 33rd Infantry Brigade was organised. On 1 February 1968, the 178th Infantry Regiment was reorganized to consist of the 1st Battalion, an element of the 33rd Infantry Brigade. The 33rd Infantry Brigade Combat Team carries on the division's heritage, and circa 2010 was assigned to the 35th Infantry Division.

== Notable members ==
- Abel Davis, commanded the 132nd Infantry Regiment of the 33rd Division during World War I
- Clayton K. Slack, served in 124th Machine Gun Battalion during World War I
- Joseph B. Sanborn, commanded the 131st Infantry Regiment of the 33rd Division during World War I
- Milton J. Foreman, Lieutenant General
- Robert V. Connolly, Major served in the 123rd Infantry Regiment and commanded famed "Connolly Task Force" on Luzo
- William Hood Simpson, General who commanded the Ninth United States Army in Europe from 1944−1945, served in numerous staff positions in the 33rd Division during World War I
- Charles R. Forbes
- John P. Lucas
- Graham B. Irish, 1st Sgt. served in the 136th Infantry Regiment of the 33rd Division during WWII. Silver Star & Purple Heart Recipient
