= Thomas A. Pope =

US Army soldier and Medal of Honor recipient (1894–1989)

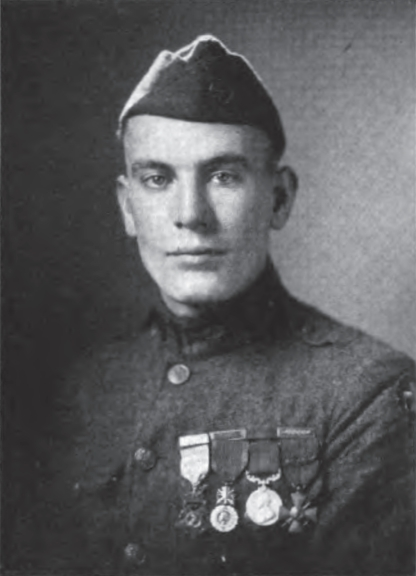
- Corporal Thomas Pope
- Born: December 15, 1894; Chicago, Illinois, US
- Died: June 14, 1989 (aged 94)
- Burial place: Arlington National Cemetery, Arlington, Virginia
- Military career
- Allegiance: United States
- Branch: United States Army
- Rank: Corporal
- Service number: 1387320
- Units: Company E, 131st Infantry, 33d Division
- Conflicts: World War I; Battle of Hamel
- Awards: Medal of Honor; Distinguished Conduct Medal (United Kingdom); Médaille militaire (France); Croix de Guerre (France)

Thomas A. Pope (December 15, 1894 – June 14, 1989) was a soldier in the United States Army who received the Medal of Honor for his actions at the Battle of Hamel, in France during World War I. Pope's unit was attached to an Australian Army battalion during the battle and, following a recommendation from an Australian officer, Pope was also awarded the Distinguished Conduct Medal, by King George V.

== Biography ==
Pope was born in Chicago, Illinois on December 15, 1894.

He joined the Illinois National Guard at Chicago, before the US entered World War I. During the war, Pope served in Company "E", 131st Infantry Regiment, 33rd Division. By the time of the Battle of Hamel, he held the rank of corporal.

After the war, he was a district foreman for the Cook County Highway Department. He also served as a contact officer for the Veterans Administration. He was married and had three daughters.

He died June 14, 1989. At the time he died, Pope was the only surviving US Army Medal of Honor recipient from World War I. He is buried at Arlington National Cemetery. Pope's great-grandson, Sergeant Alexzander G. Teschner, went on to join the U.S. Army and served in the same unit as Pope, also receiving the Purple Heart while serving with the 82nd Airborne division.

== Medal of Honor ==
General of the Armies John J. Pershing awarded the Medal of Honor to Pope on 22 April 1919 in Ettlebruck, Luxembourg.

Citation:
His company was advancing behind the tanks when it was halted by hostile machinegun fire. Going forward alone, he rushed a machinegun nest, killed several of the crew with his bayonet, and, standing astride his gun, held off the others until reinforcements arrived and captured them.

== See also ==
- List of Medal of Honor recipients
- List of Medal of Honor recipients for World War I
