= General Sanborn =

General Sanborn may refer to:

- John B. Sanborn (1826–1904), Union Army brigadier general
- Joseph B. Sanborn (1855–1934), U.S. Army lieutenant general
- Russell A. Sanborn (fl. 1980s–2010s), U.S. Marine Corps major general
