= 7th Illinois Volunteer Regiment =

7th Illinois Volunteer Regiment may refer to the following military units:

- 7th Illinois Infantry Regiment, a volunteer infantry regiment that served in the Civil War
- 7th Illinois Cavalry Regiment, a volunteer cavalry regiment that served in the Civil War
- 7th Illinois Infantry Regiment (National Guard), now known as the 122nd Field Artillery Regiment
