= Clayton K. Slack =

US Army soldier and Medal of Honor recipient

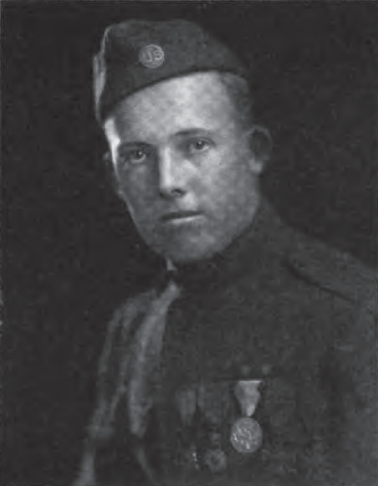
- Clayton Slack
- Born: February 23, 1896; Plover, Wisconsin, US
- Died: March 1, 1976 (aged 80)
- Burial place: Arlington National Cemetery, Arlington, Virginia
- Military career
- Allegiance: United States of America
- Branch: United States Army
- Rank: Private
- Service number: 2055344
- Units: Company D, 124th Machine Gun Battalion, 33d Division
- Conflicts: World War I
- Awards: Medal of Honor; Silver Star; Purple Heart

Clayton Kirk Slack (February 23, 1896 – March 1, 1976) was a soldier in the United States Army who received the Medal of Honor for his actions during World War I.

== Biography ==
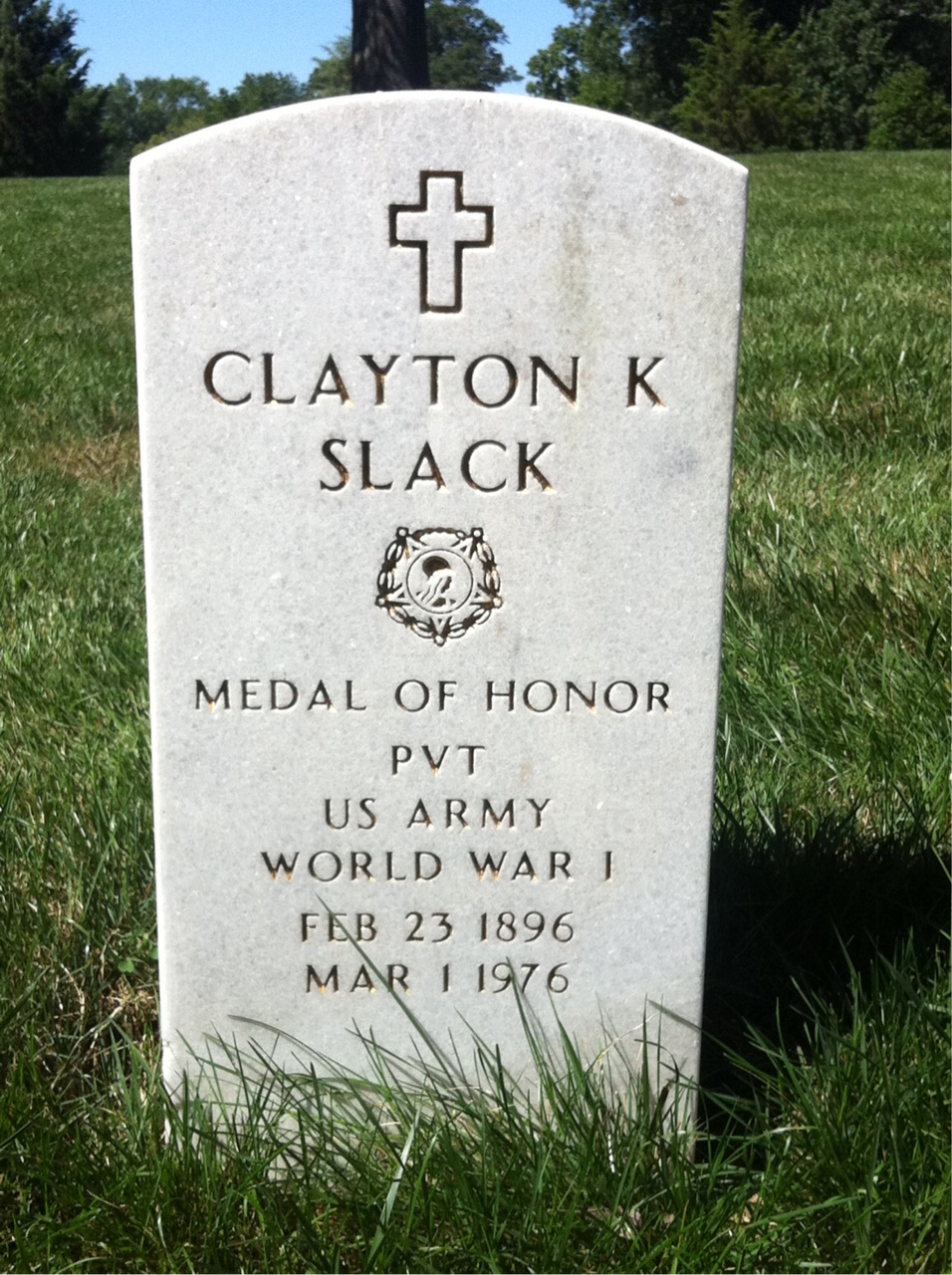
Grave at Arlington National Cemetery

Slack was born in Plover, Wisconsin on February 23, 1896.

Clayton Slack joined the United States Army from Madison, Wisconsin in September 1917. He was assigned to the 33rd Division. He volunteered for machine gun duty and served with the Company D, 124th Machine Gun Battalion, 33rd Division.

As a private, he was cited for single-handedly clearing out a German machine gun nest resulting in 10 prisoners and the capture of 2 machine-guns on October 8, 1918, in the Meuse–Argonne offensive, the biggest battle of World War I involving American troops.

Slack noticed several German troops and charged at them with his rifle and bayonet telling them to "put their hands up". The German soldiers thinking that he was at the lead of a patrol, surrendered. Slack's actions were credited with saving his unit heavy casualties.

After the war, Slack toured the United States with war films and by the time of his death had met six presidents. In 1963, President John F. Kennedy hosted a reunion of Medal of Honor recipients at the White House for the 100th anniversary of the first presentation of the medal. Slack attended the function along with a number of other Medal of Honor recipients.

He died March 1, 1976, and is buried at Arlington National Cemetery Arlington, Virginia. His grave can be found in section 34, lot 59.

== Medal of Honor citation ==
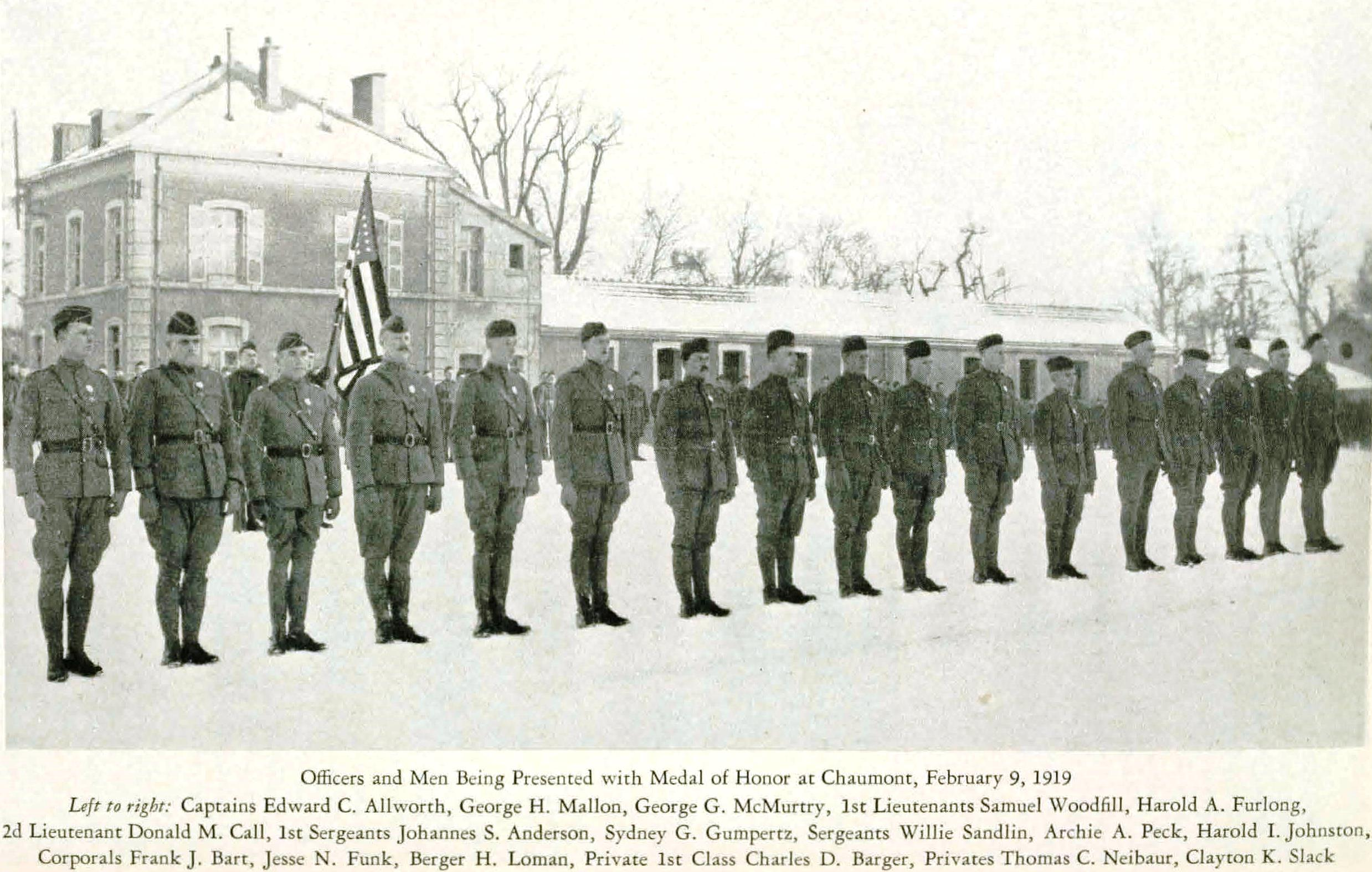
Medal of Honor Presentation Ceremony – February 9, 1919, at Chaumont, France. General John J. Pershing presided.

Rank and organization: Private, U.S. Army, Company D, 124th Machine Gun Battalion, 33d Division. Place and date: Near Consenvoye, France, 8 October 1918. Entered service at: Madison, Wis. Born: 23 February 1896, Plover, Wis. G.O. No.: 16, W.D., 1919.

Citation:

Observing German soldiers under cover 50 yards away on the left flank, Pvt. Slack, upon his own initiative, rushed them with his rifle and, single-handed, captured 10 prisoners and 2 heavy-type machineguns, thus saving his company and neighboring organizations from heavy casualties.

== See also ==
- List of Medal of Honor recipients
- List of Medal of Honor recipients for World War I
