= 129th Infantry Regiment (United States) =

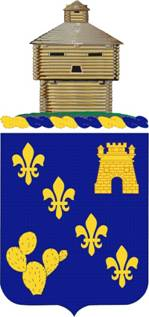
- Active: 1861-
- Country: United States
- Allegiance: Illinois
- Branch: Illinois Army National Guard
- Role: Training
- Size: Regiment
- Part of: 33rd Infantry Division; 37th Infantry Division; 44th Infantry Division
- Garrison/HQ: Springfield, Illinois

Insignia
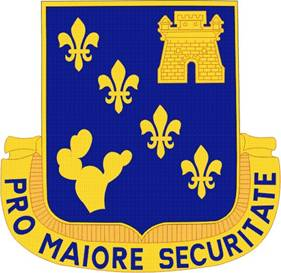
- Distinctive unit insignia

The 129th Infantry Regiment is a United States military unit of the Illinois National Guard. The 129th has served in the American Civil War, Spanish-American War, Pancho Villa Expedition, World War I, and World War II.

== Civil War ==
The 129th Infantry traces its lineage to the 11th and 12th Illinois Volunteer Infantry Regiments, constituted on 16 April 1861 and organized as three-month units from volunteers in northern Illinois, excluding Chicago. The 12th Illinois was mustered into federal service at Springfield, Illinois on 25 April, while the 11th Illinois was mustered into federal service at Springfield on 30 April; the 12th Illinois was mustered out at Cairo, Illinois, on 25 July, while the 11th Illinois was mustered out at Cairo on 30 July. The two regiments were reorganized at Cairo on 31 July-1 August, and following three-year reenlistment service, were again mustered out on 10 July 1865 at Louisville, Kentucky (12th), and 14 July 1865 at Baton Rouge, Louisiana (11th).

== Postbellum to World War I ==
Independent companies were reorganized in the northern part of the state, again excluding Chicago, as part of the Illinois State Guard from 1868-1873, and on 21 December 1875, they were consolidated to form the 3rd and 4th Infantry Regiments. On 1 July 1877, the Illinois State Guard was redesignated the Illinois National Guard. From 1882-1890, the companies were reassigned to the 3rd Infantry Regiment. The 3rd Illinois was mustered into federal service on 7 May 1898 for the Spanish-American War at Camp Tanner, Springfield, Illinois, as the 3rd Illinois Volunteer Infantry, and was mustered out of service on 24 January 1899 at Joliet, Illinois. The regiment was subsequently reorganized in state service as the 3rd Infantry in 1903. The 3rd Illinois was again mustered into federal service for the Pancho Villa Expedition on 29 June 1916, and was mustered out of service on 21 February 1917 at Fort Sheridan, Illinois. For World War I, the 3rd Illinois was called into federal service on 25 March 1917 and drafted into federal service on 5 August 1917. On 12 October 1917, the regiment was redesignated the 129th Infantry Regiment, 33rd Division.

== Interwar period ==
The 129th Infantry arrived at the port of New York on 23 May 1919 on the USS Leviathan as an element of the 33rd Division, and was demobilized 6 June 1919 at Camp Grant, Illinois. It was reconstituted in the National Guard in 1921, assigned to the 33rd Division, and allotted to the state of Illinois. It was partially organized in 1921 as the 3rd Infantry, Illinois National Guard, and redesignated as the 129th Infantry on 13 December 1921. The headquarters was organized on 30 January 1924 and federally recognized at Pontiac, Illinois, and relocated on 1 November 1930 to Sycamore, Illinois. The regiment, or elements thereof, was called up to perform the following state duties: tornado relief work at Carbondale, Illinois, 18 March–13 April 1925; martial law in connection with civil disorders in Mundelein, Illinois, 23–25 June 1926; three companies for riot control at the Joliet Prison Riot, 18–23 March 1931; 3rd Battalion acted as honor guard for President Herbert Hoover at the rededication of the Lincoln Tomb at Springfield, Illinois, 17 June 1931; entire regiment for strike duty at a coal miners’ strike at Springfield and Taylorville, Illinois, in March–April 1933; and three companies for strike duty at a labor strike in Freeport, Illinois, in June 1935. The regiment conducted annual summer training most years at Camp Grant, from 1922 to 39. For at least one year, in 1936, the regiment also trained some 15 company-grade infantry officers of the 86th Division at Camp Grant. It was inducted into active federal service at Sycamore on 5 March 1941 and moved to Camp Forrest, Tennessee, where it arrived 20 March 1941.

== World War II ==
The 129th Infantry Regiment was detached from the 33rd Infantry Division on 31 July 1943, sent as a garrison force to Espiritu Santo, and later assigned to the 37th Infantry Division on Bougainville during the Bougainville campaign on 13 November. The 129th Infantry Regiment participated during the Philippines campaign and was detached and attached to the 33rd Infantry Division between 26 March and 10 April 1945, before rejoining the 37th Infantry Division.

== Modern ==
The 129th Infantry was inactivated on 13 December 1945 at Camp Anza, California. On 5 July 1946, the regiment was relieved from assignment to the 37th Infantry Division and assigned to the 44th Infantry Division, which was reestablished as a National Guard division in Illinois. The regimental headquarters was organized and federally recognized on 18 December 1946 at Dixon, Illinois. The regiment is now known as the 129th Regiment (Regional Training Institute), providing training for Illinois National Guard personnel at the Illinois Military Academy at Camp Lincoln, Springfield, Illinois. The 129th Infantry Drive in Joliet, Illinois is named in honor of the regiment.

== Honors ==
=== Campaign credits ===
Civil War

- Henry and Donelson
- Shiloh
- Vicksburg
- Atlanta
- Mississippi 1862-1864
- Tennessee 1862-1863
- Georgia 1864
- Alabama 1864-1865

Spanish-American War

- Puerto Rico

World War I

- Lorraine
- Somme Offensive
- Picardy

World War II

- Northern Solomons
- Luzon (with arrowhead device)

=== Decorations ===
- Philippine Presidential Unit Citation embroidered 17 OCTOBER 1944 to 4 July 1945

== Sources ==
- Global Security - 129th Regiment Regional Training Institute
- 33rdinfantrydivision.org - Units
- HyperWar - 37th Division
