= 178th Infantry Regiment (United States) =

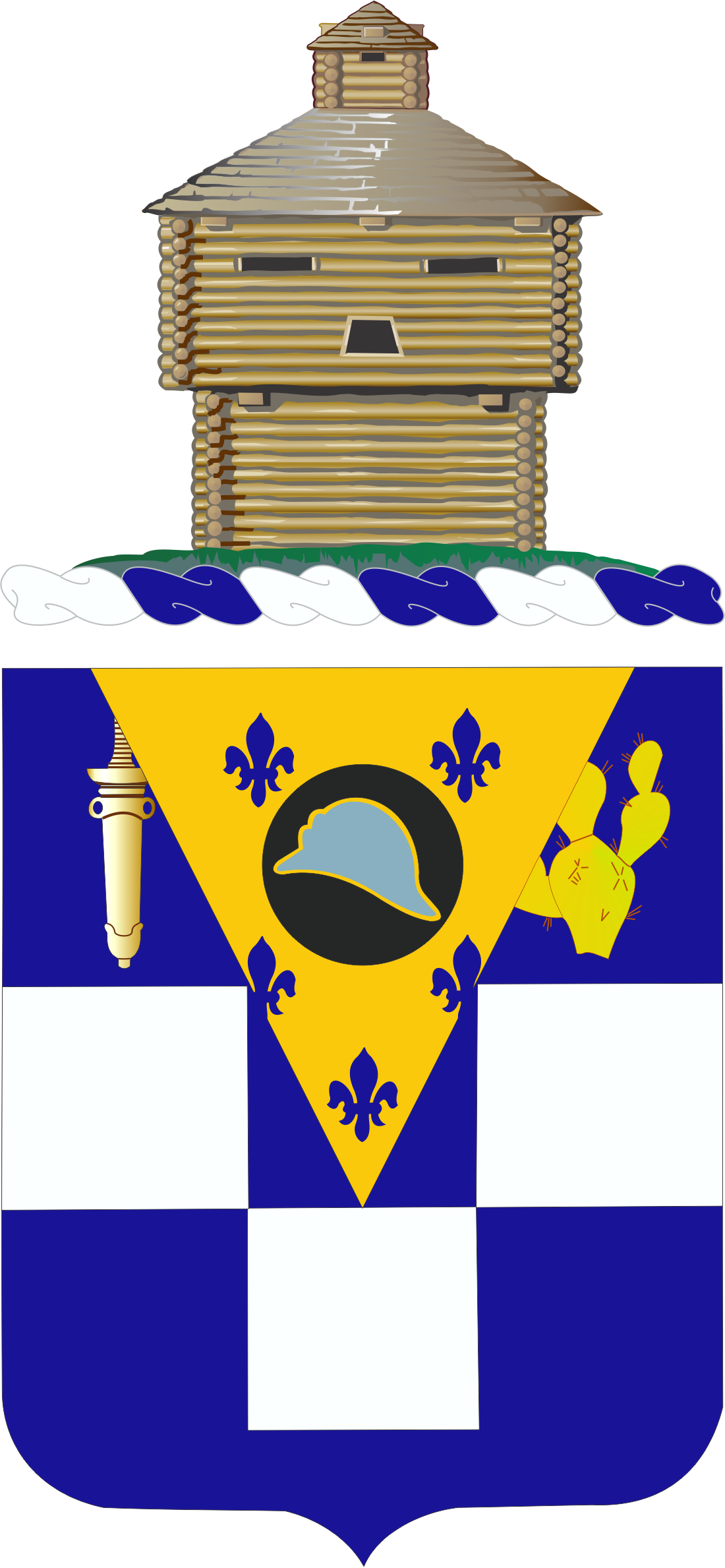
- Coat of Arms.
- Country: United States of America
- Allegiance: Illinois
- Branch: Army National Guard
- Type: Infantry regiment
- Garrison/HQ: Chicago, Illinois
- Mottos: One Country, One Flag.

Insignia
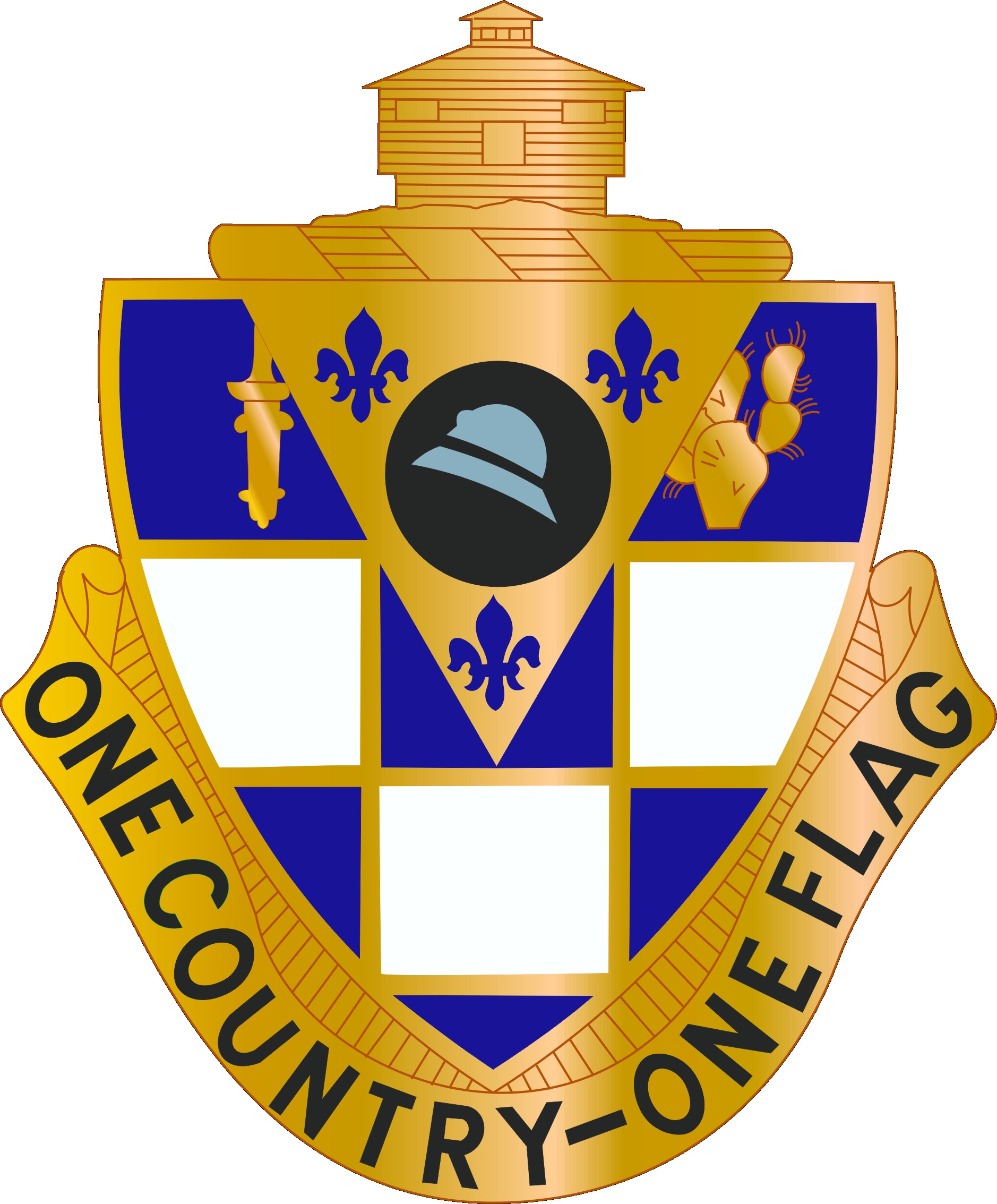
- Identification symbol

The 178th Infantry Regiment is an infantry regiment of the United States Army, Illinois Army National Guard. It traces its history back to the Illinois state militia and has served in several American wars since its founding. The regiment is unique because its original members were part of a segregated "colored" unit. The regiment's 1st Battalion (1-178 Infantry) still exists today as an Air assault battalion.

== History ==
The 178th Infantry Regiment traces its history back to the formation of the 16th Battalion, Illinois State Militia, on 1 April 1878. A and B Companies were recruited from Chicago. The Clark County Guards from Marshall became C Company, and the Cumberland County Guards from Greenup became D Company. Elements of the 178th have been reputed to extend back to 1871, with the formation of the Hannibal Guard, but federal and state recognition did not come until 1878. The Illinois General Assembly removed the 16th from the military roster in 1882, but it was reactivated soon after in 1883 as the Chicago Light Infantry until its disbanding in 1887. In 1890, the unit was reactivated as the 9th Infantry Battalion, and was accepted into the Illinois State Guard in 1894.

=== Spanish American War ===
After expanding in size and funds, it was redesignated the 8th Illinois Volunteer Infantry Regiment (Colored Troops). On 28 June 1898, the unit was called into service in the Spanish–American War with a strength of 43 officers and 1,126 enlisted men. The regiment served in Cuba from 16 August 1898 to 10 March 1899, and suffered no casualties. The unit returned to Chicago and was demobilized on 3 April.

The Eighth Infantry Regiment was federalized on 30 June 1916, in Springfield, and served briefly during the Mexican Border War. It was discharged from service at Springfield on 27 October 1916.

=== World War I ===
On 3 August 1917, the 8th was called to serve in World War I, and was renamed the 370th Infantry Regiment, and was placed in the 185th Infantry Brigade as part of the provisional 93rd Infantry Division on 5 January 1918. The 178th, which had not yet been activated, traces much of its history to the service of the 370th in France during World War I. Upon returning to Illinois, the regiment was disbanded on 11 March 1919.

=== World War II ===
The 370th was reorganized as the 8th Illinois again in June 1919, and conducted state duties, including intensive training and maneuvers until 6 October 1940, when it was redesignated as the 184th Field Artillery Regiment (155 mm howitzer. After receiving many new recruits in preparation for World War II. The 184th trained intensely at Fort Custer, Michigan and eventually deployed to the ETO, earning campaign streamers for the Rhineland Campaign and the Central Europe Campaign.

While training in Michigan, men of the regiment were detached to form the 795th Tank Destroyer Battalion in February 1942. On 16 January 1943, further restructuring followed as men of the regiment were detached to furnish new "colored" units for the Army. The 930th and 931st Field Artillery Battalions were created, and were subsequently converted into the 1698th and 1699th Combat Engineer Battalions, respectively, by 20 March 1944. These men reported to the 92nd Infantry Division and served in the North Apennines Campaign and the Po Valley Campaign.

=== 178th Regimental Combat Team ===
After World War II, the 184th Field Artillery was redesignated as the 178th Regimental Combat Team on 31 March 1947. The RCT contained the 178th Infantry Regiment (the parent unit), the 184th Field Artillery Battalion, the 1698th Engineer Company, the 184th Medical Collecting Company, and the 154th Army Band.

=== Desegregation ===
On 26 July 1948, President Harry Truman issued Executive Order 9981 in order to desegregate the US Military, and although the units of the Illinois National Guard were no longer split by race, the 178th remembers its proud history as a segregated African-American unit. At the outbreak of the Korean War in 1950, the 184th Medical Collecting Company was detached from the 178th and did not return until the war ended, four years later.

=== 1968 Democratic National Convention ===
After reorganizations in 1959, 1963, and 1965, the First Battalion, 1-178, was assigned to the 33rd Infantry Division on 1 February 1968 and assisted in riot control in Chicago during the 1968 Democratic National Convention.

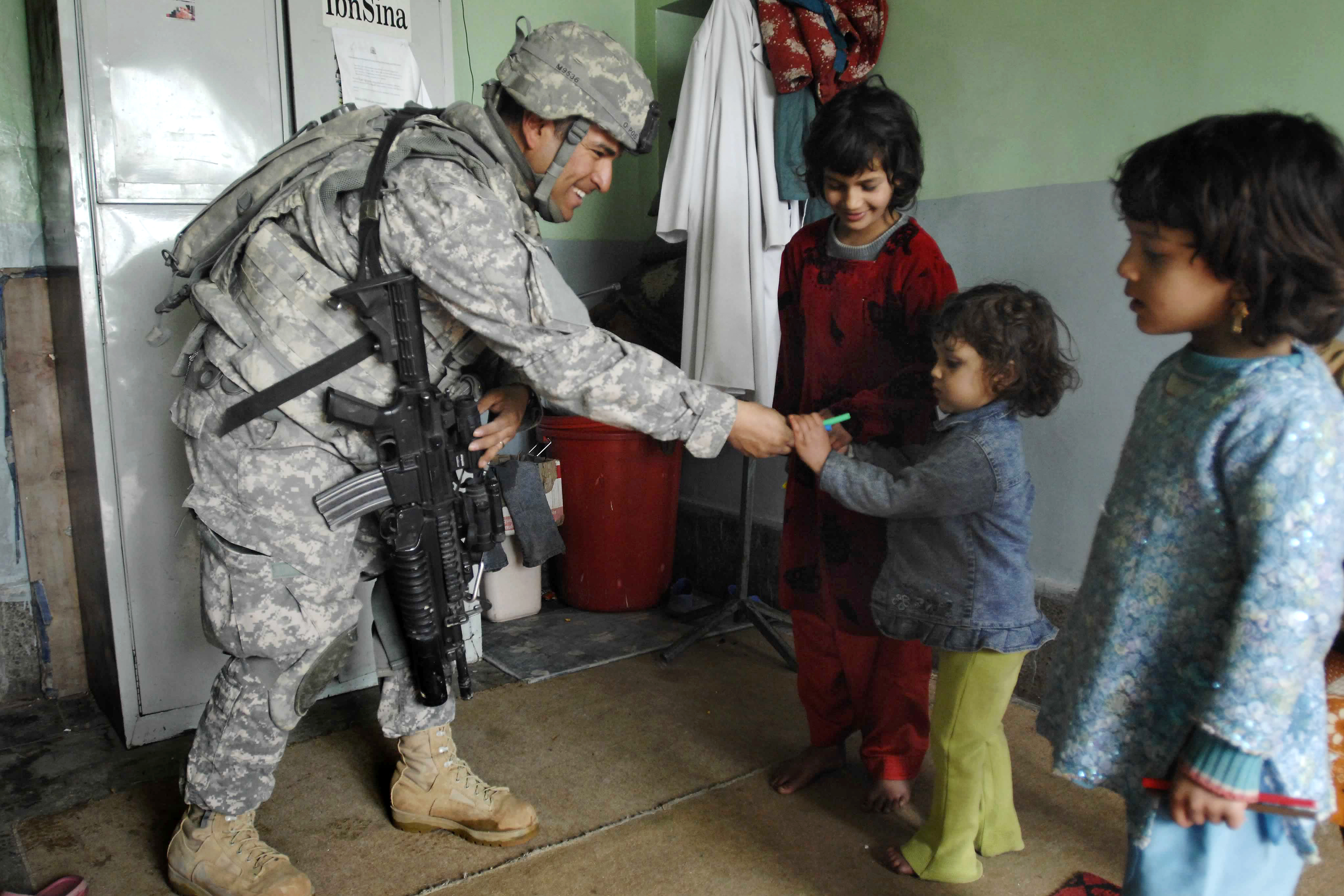
SGT Heriberto Medina, 1-178, gives school supplies to a girl in a hospital in Paktia Province, Afghanistan. 17 February 2009.

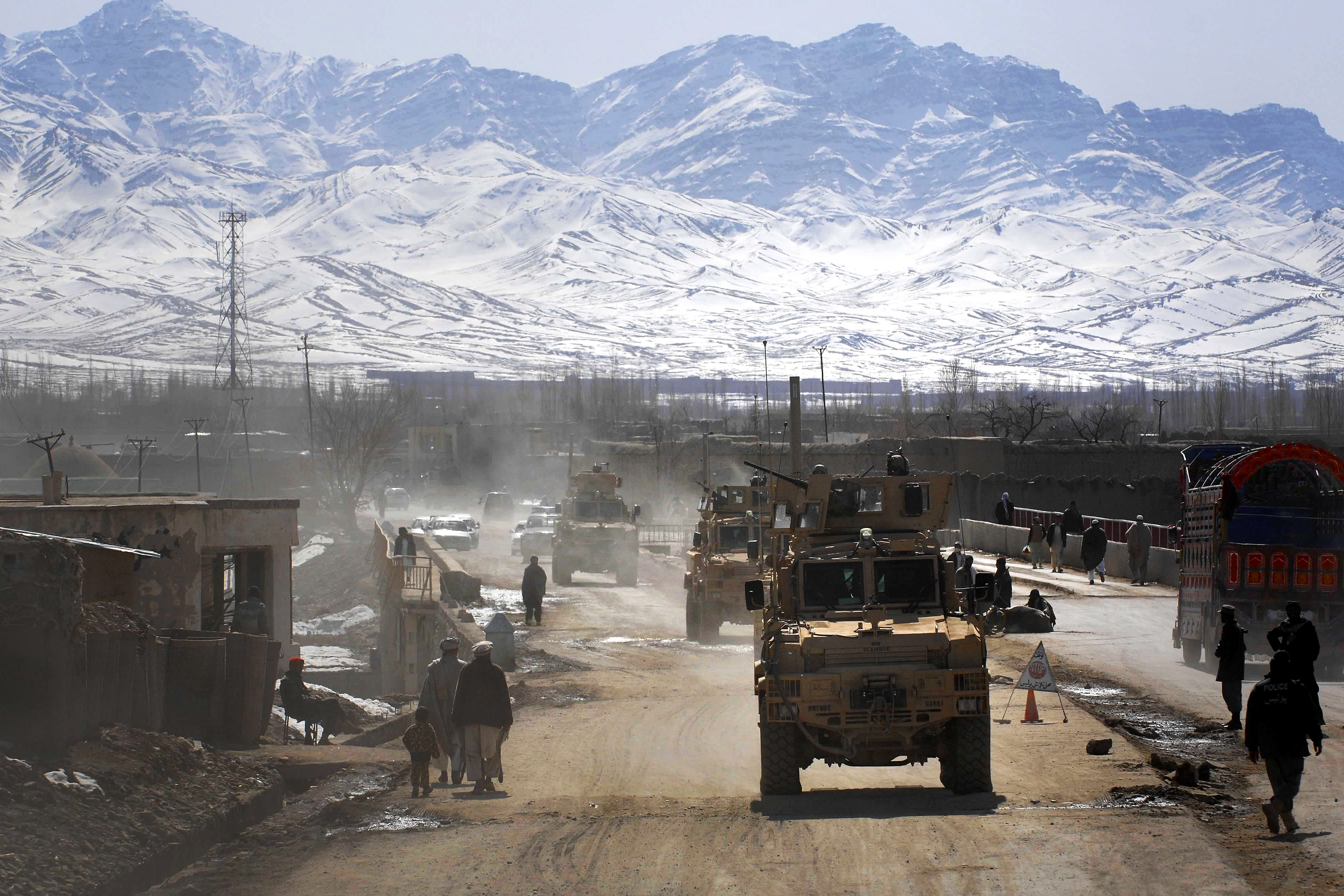
1-178 driving an armored convoy in Gardez City, the capital of Paktia Province. 17 February 2009.

Since 1968, 1-178 has performed state duties in riot control, natural disaster relief, and overseas training missions. In the winter of 2008, as a part of the 33rd Infantry Brigade Combat Team, the battalion was deployed to several provinces across Afghanistan to perform SECFOR missions and assist in Provincial Reconstruction Teams, including Paktia Province, Afghanistan in support of Operation Enduring Freedom, where they relieved elements of the 27th IBCT, New York Army National Guard. The heavy mortar platoon, consisting of four 120 mm mortars and four 81 mm mortars were placed at Command Outpost (COP) Najil, Lagman province and in Forward Operating Base (FOB) Metar Lam. They returned home in 2009

In July 2019 the battalion again deployed to both Patyika and Logar province of Afghanistan, the same area where Bravo Company was involved in combat during Operation Enduring. Later in February the battalion was moved over to Helmand province to provide area security for TF West for the remainder of the mobilization. The battalion was awarded the Meritorious Unit Citation for their service in support of Operation Freedom Sentinel 2019-2020. Numerous Combat Infantryman Badges and Combat Action Badges had been awarded for actions throughout the deployment.

In the spring of 2020, the battalion returned home in April, and, in the summer of 2020, the battalion was called to action again, to provide riot control duties in the wake of the George Floyd protests in the Chicagoland area for an additional three weeks.

== Current structure ==
1st Battalion, 178th Infantry Regiment (IL ARNG)

- Headquarters and Headquarters Company; Chicago
- A Company: Bartonville
- B Company: Elgin
- C Company: Kankakee
  - Detachment 1: Joliet
- D Company: Woodstock
- G Company, 634th Brigade Support Battalion (Forward Support Company): Joliet
