= 131st Infantry Regiment (United States) =

- coat of arms
- Active: 1874
- Country: United States
- Allegiance: Illinois
- Branch: Illinois Army National Guard
- Type: Infantry
- Size: Regiment
- Nickname: FIRST ILLINOIS
- Motto: DUCIT AMOR PATRIAE (Led by love of country)

Commanders
- Notable commanders: Maj. Gen. Joseph B. Sanborn

Insignia
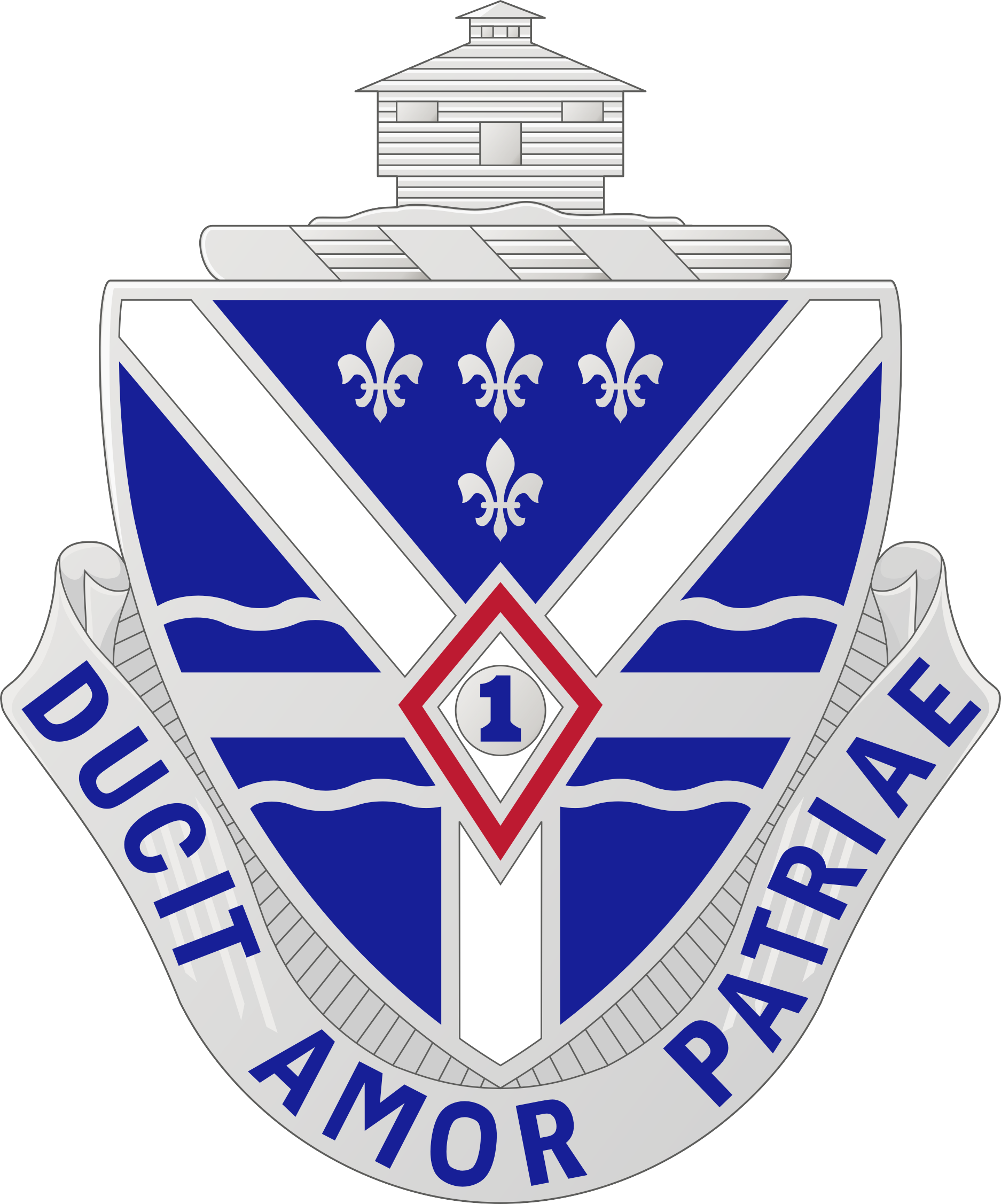
- Distinctive Unit Insignia

The 131st Infantry Regiment is an Infantry Regiment in the Army National Guard.

== Lineage ==
Constituted in the Illinois State Guard as the 1st Battalion of Infantry and organized 14 September 1874 in Chicago from the following companies raised entirely by subscription:

- Company A, Captain Graeme Stewart;
- Company B, Captain Edwin B. Knox;
- Company C, Captain Mason B. Carpenter;
- Company D, Captain John W. Hawley.
- Expanded and redesignated as 1st Regiment of Infantry, Illinois State Guard, 5 October 1874.
- Redesignated as 1st Regiment, Illinois State Guard, 21 December 1875. (Illinois State Guard redesignated Illinois National Guard 1 July 1877.)
- Mustered into Federal service at Springfield, 13 May 1898 as 1st Illinois Volunteer Infantry; served in Cuba and mustered out 17 November 1898 at Chicago.
- Mustered into Federal service 26 June 1916 for Mexican Border and stationed at San Antonio, Texas; mustered out 4 October 1916.
- Mustered into Federal service 4 April 1917; drafted into Federal service 5 August 1917. Redesignated as the 131st Infantry and assigned to the 33rd Division 12 October 1917.
- Demobilized 6 June 1919 at Camp Grant (Illinois).
- Reorganized during June 1919 as the 1st Infantry, Illinois National Guard.
- Redesignated as the 131st Infantry and assigned to the 33d Division 13 December 1921.
- Federally recognized 18 August 1922 at Chicago.
- Inducted into Federal service 5 March 1941 at Chicago. Relieved from the 33d Division 21 February 1942.
- Inactivated 26 February 1944 at Fort Benning, Georgia.
- Assigned to the 33d Infantry Division 5 July 1946. Reorganized and Federally recognized 20 December 1946 at Chicago.
- consolidated on 15 March 1954, with the 132nd Infantry Regiment (United States) and the consolidated unit designated as the 131st Infantry, an element of the 33rd Infantry Division.
- Relieved from the 33d Infantry Division 1 March 1959 and reorganized as the 131st Infantry, a parent regiment under the Combat Arms Regimental System·to consist of the 1st Battle Group, an element of the 33d Infantry Division.
- reorganized on 1 April 1963 to consist of the 1st Battalion, an element of the 33d Division;
- reorganized on 1 December 1965 to consist of the 1st Battalion;
- reorganized on 1 February 1968 to consist of the 1st Battalion, an element of the 33rd Infantry Brigade (United States).
- ordered into active Federal service on 7 April 1968 at Chicago. It was released from active Federal service on 11 April 1968 and reverted to state control.
- withdrawn on 5 February 1987 from the Combat Arms Regimental System and reorganized under the United States Army Regimental System with headquarters in Chicago.

== Distinctive unit insignia ==
- Description

A Silver color metal and enamel device 1 1/4 inches (3.2 cm) in height consisting of a shield blazoned: Azure, a closet between two wavy barrulets, surmounted by a pairle, Argent; overall the old insignia of the First Regiment of Infantry, Illinois National Guard, (wheel within a diamond) Proper; in chief four fleurs-de-lis, three and one, of the second. Attached above the shield on a wreath, upon a grassy field the blockhouse of old Fort Dearborn, all Silver Gray. Attached below and to the sides of the shield a Silver scroll inscribed "DUCIT AMOR PATRIAE" in Blue letters.

- Symbolism

The shield is blue – the present Infantry color, and the main charges are silver or white – the old Infantry facing color. The pairle is taken from the Chicago seal: the first wavy barrulets represents Spanish–American War service, the closet Mexican Border duty, and the second wavy barrulets the second time the organization was in Federal service overseas. The four fleurs-de-lis represent the engagements during World War I. The charge in the fess point is the insignia of the old First Regiment of Infantry, Illinois National Guard. The motto translates to "Led By Love Of Country."

- Background

The distinctive unit insignia was approved for the 131st Infantry Regiment on 19 April 1927.

== Coat of arms ==
- Blazon
  - Shield

Azure, a closet between two wavy barrulets, surmounted by a pairle, Argent; overall the old insignia of the First Regiment of Infantry, Illinois National Guard, (wheel within a diamond) Proper; in chief four fleurs-de-lis, three and one, of the second.

- Crest

That for the regiments and separate battalions of the Illinois Army National Guard: On a wreath of the colors Argent and Azure, upon a grassy field the blockhouse of old Fort Dearborn Proper. Motto: DUCIT AMOR PATRIAE (Led By Love Of Country).

- Symbolism
  - Shield

The shield is blue – the present Infantry color, and the main charges are silver or white – the old Infantry facing color. The pairle is taken from the Chicago seal: the first wavy barrulets represents Spanish–American War service, the closet Mexican Border duty, and the second wavy barrulets the second time the organization was in Federal service overseas. The four fleurs-de-lis represent the engagements during World War I. The charge in the fess point is the insignia of the old First Regiment of Infantry, Illinois National Guard.

- Crest

The crest is that of the Illinois Army National Guard.

- Background

The coat of arms was approved on 19 April 1927

== Campaign streamers ==
Through consolidation with the 132nd Infantry Regiment, the 131st Infantry Regiment is entitled to display World War II-era awards earned by the former unit.

- Presidential Unit Citation (Navy), streamer embroidered GUADALCANAL
- Philippine Presidential Unit Citation, streamer embroidered 17 OCTOBER 1944 to 4 JULY 1945
- Presidential Unit Citation (Army), streamer embroidered BOUGAINVILLE (Company B, 1st Battalion [Machesney Park])

== Decorations ==
Presidential Unit Citation (Navy) Philippine Presidential Unit Citation
