= Joseph B. Sanborn =

United States Army general

Lt. General Joseph Brown Sanborn
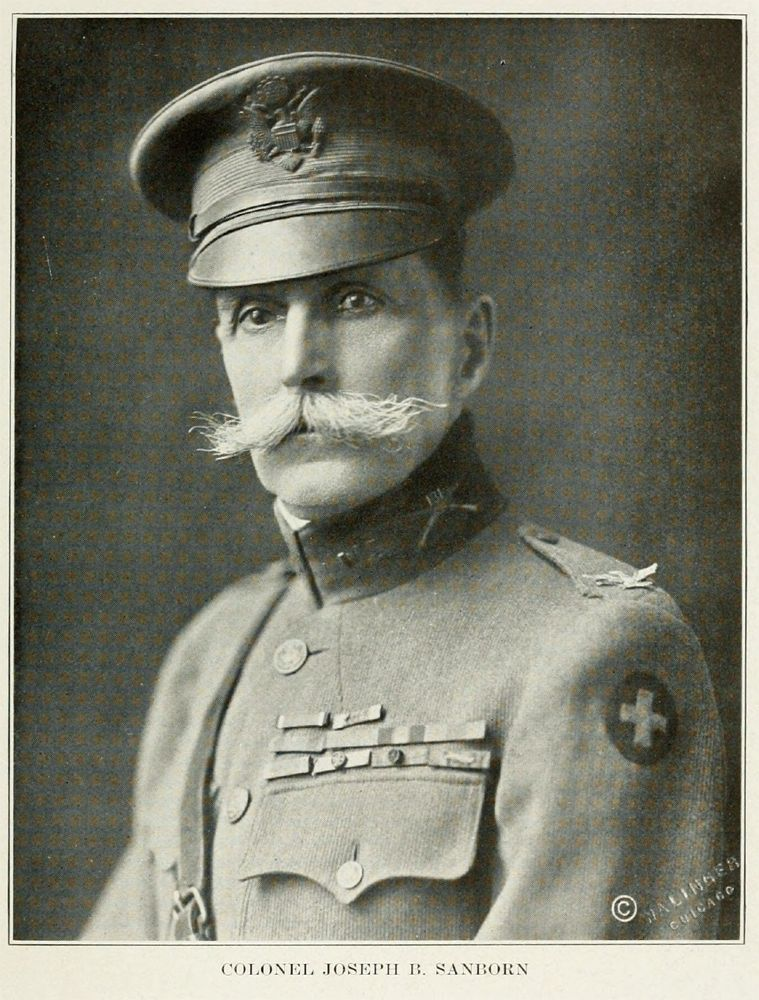
- Sanborn in 1919
- Born: December 8, 1855; Chester, New Hampshire, US
- Died: December 22, 1934 (aged 79); Chicago, Illinois, US
- Burial place: Oak Woods Cemetery
- Spouses: Julie Flanders (m. 1887; died 1921) Willa Alice Weck (m. 1924)
- Military career
- Allegiance: American
- Branch: United States Army, Illinois National Guard
- Awards: Distinguished Service Cross, Distinguished Service Order, Distinguished Service Medal, Legion of Honor, Croix de Guerre, and Order of Leopold

Joseph Brown Sanborn (1855–1934) was Commander of the 131st Infantry Regiment of the 33rd Division during World War I.

== Early life ==
Joseph B. Sanborn was born on December 8, 1855, in Chester, New Hampshire, to Rachel and Josiah Sanborn. Sanborn moved to Chicago in 1887.

== Military ==
Joseph B. Sanborn enlisted in the Illinois National Guard as a private on March 8, 1880. Private Sanborn won his first commission in 1882. He worked his way up from second lieutenant in 1882 to first lieutenant in 1884, to captain in 1886, and to major in 1891.

=== Spanish–American War ===
Sanborn commanded the first battalion of the First Illinois Volunteer Infantry in the Santiago campaign of the Spanish–American War. On December 22, 1898, he was made Major of the First Infantry Illinois National Guard. During the Mexican Border disturbances in 1916 Sanborn was colonel. In 1917, the First Illinois Infantry became the 131st Regiment, U.S. Infantry, and "answered the call to service in the war with Germany."

=== World War I ===
On May 30, 1918, Colonel Sanborn arrived in France with the 131st Regiment. They participated in the Somme and Meuse-Argonne offensives between August 8, 1918, and November 11, 1918.

The Chipilly Ridge and the Gressaire Wood had been strongly fortified by the enemy, and it was impossible for the Americans and British to advance in that vicinity. Any attempt to overtake it proved "abortive". On August 9, 1918, near Gressaire, Sanborn personally led his regiment through heavy shell fire and started the attack at the right moment. He established his post of command and directed the battle to a successful end. The 131st were thrown into battle against the most seasoned of the German troops, and lacked adequate preparations. Despite this, they were able to maintain their focus and calm. On August 10, 1918, they were able to report to the commanding general of the Forty-Eighth Division that their objective had been reached.

Those in the 131st regiment commended Colonel Sanborn for his bravery and inspiring leadership. Sergeant C. William Keane recounted a story when Sanborn brought his men food through gunfire: "Col. Sanborn personally brought us rations on his back...He did that because he wanted to be sure that the food would reach us and he figured the best way to make sure was to carry it himself. Who wouldn't fight like the devil under a commander like that?" At the time of the battle, Colonel Sanborn was 62 years old. The 131st Regiment's victory at Gressaire Wood was a "decisive stroke in the Somme offensive." In a letter written to Bernard A. Eckhart, Colonel Sanborn wrote, "I am very proud of the record of the regiment in the offensive of August 9...and as a result twenty-two men in the regiment received decorations of various kinds and Great Britain has conferred upon me the D.S.O decoration, which I understand is the first that has been given any American in this war." He also wrote that the regiment continued to push on despite difficulties, especially bad weather.

=== Retirement ===
In March 1921, Sanborn was removed from command of the state troops and put on the retirement list. This was done in order to make room for Major General Milton J. Foreman. Also, Adjutant General Dickson explained that Sanborn had passed the age limit of 64 years and all state military codes required that all officers of retiring age be put on the retirement list. Sanborn transferred command on June 20, 1921. He retired as lieutenant general on April 6, 1931.

=== Awards ===
For his services in World War I, Sanborn was recognized by the American, British, French, and Belgian governments. For bravely leading his regiment at Gressaire Wood and Chippilly Ridge, he was awarded the Distinguished Service Cross by the American government and the Distinguished Service Order by the British government. He also received the Distinguished Service Medal from the American government, the decorations of Officer of the Legion of Honour and Croix de Guerre with Palm from the French government, and Officer of the Order of Leopold from the Belgian government.

== Later years ==
Sanborn's grave at Oak Woods Cemetery

Joseph B. Sanborn was the president of the J. B. Sanborn Co., a mercantile agency from 1886 to 1925. From 1919 to 1921, he was the State Tax Commissioner.

Sanborn died on December 22, 1934, in Chicago, Illinois, and was buried at Oak Woods Cemetery.

== Personal life ==
He was married to Julie Flanders in 1887. They had two daughters, Helen and Katherine. He remarried to Willa Alice Weck on September 4, 1924.

== External links and further reading ==
- Bust of General Sanborn, Pritzker Military Museum & Library
- Photos of J. B. Sanborn, Chicago History Museum
- Chicago Hosts in Solemn Line Honor M'Kinley at Chicago Tribune Archives
- Col Sanborn's Gallantry Told of in a Letter at Chicago Tribune Archives
- Col Sanborn and Thompson at Chicago Tribune Archives
- First Infantry, I.N.G., again to be organized at Chicago Tribune Archives
- Lundin Drive to Oust Sanborn is Withering at Chicago Tribune Archives
- Reunion of Old First at Chicago Tribune Archives
- Parade of the First Regiment at Chicago Tribune Archives
- Sanborn's Men Won Admiration of Australians at Chicago Tribune Archives
- Sunday Camp at Lincoln at Chicago Tribune Archives
- Biggs, Donald F.; Zimmerman, William Jr.; Stealey, Watterson, eds. (1921). Illinois in the World War: An Illustrated History of the Thirty-Third Division. Vol. 1. Chicago: States Publication Society. pp. 209–211, 223, 225, 231.
- Sanborn, Joseph B. (1919). The 131st Infantry (First Infantry Illinois national guard) in the World War; Narrative-Operations-Statistics. Chicago.
