= 33rd Infantry Brigade Combat Team =

- Shoulder sleeve insignia
- Active: 1968-present
- Country: United States
- Allegiance: Illinois Army National Guard
- Branch: United States Army National Guard
- Type: Infantry
- Size: Brigade
- Part of: 38th Infantry Division
- Garrison/HQ: Urbana, Illinois
- Nickname: "Golden Cross"
- Engagements: War in Afghanistan

Insignia
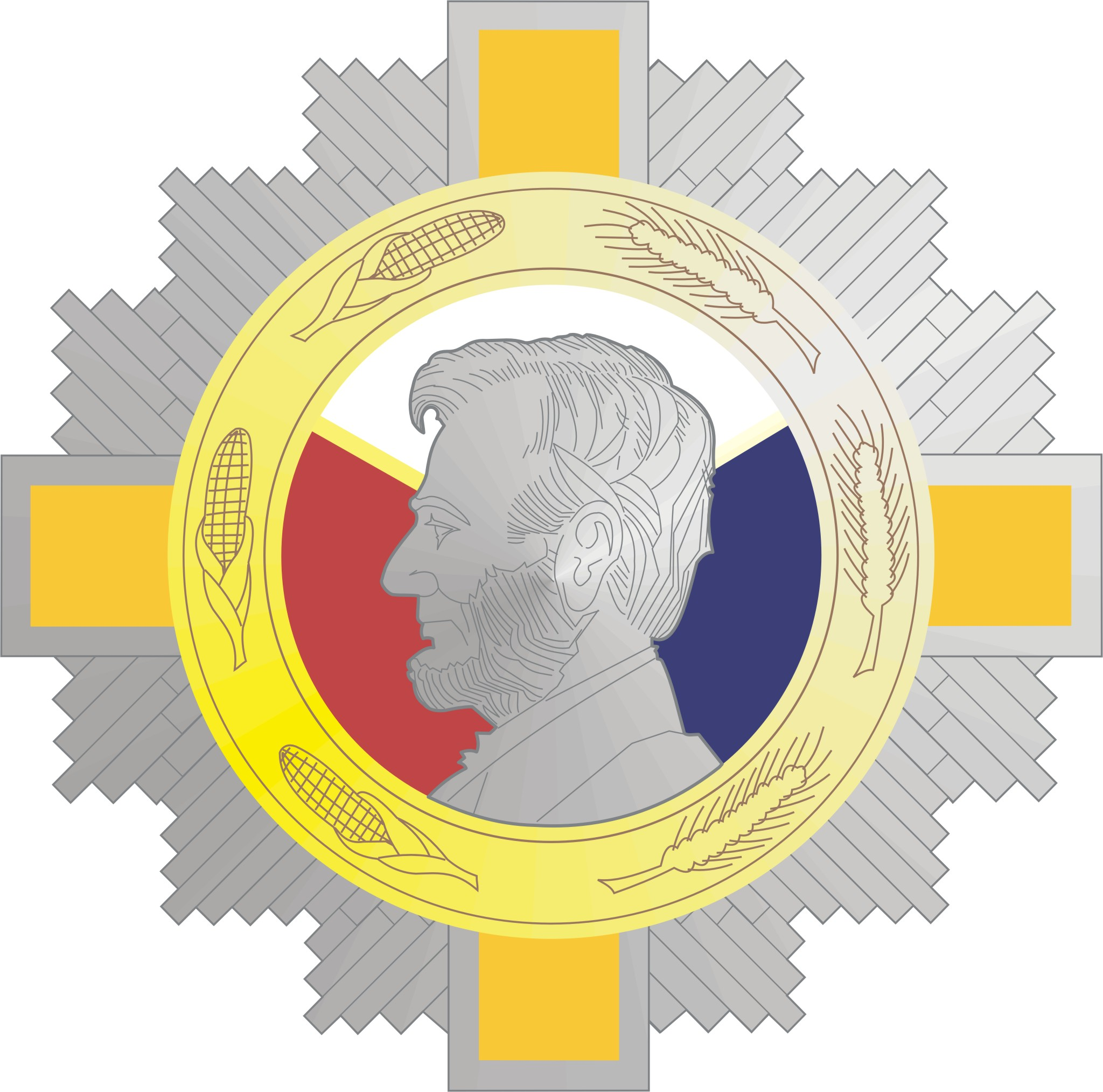
- Distinctive unit insignia

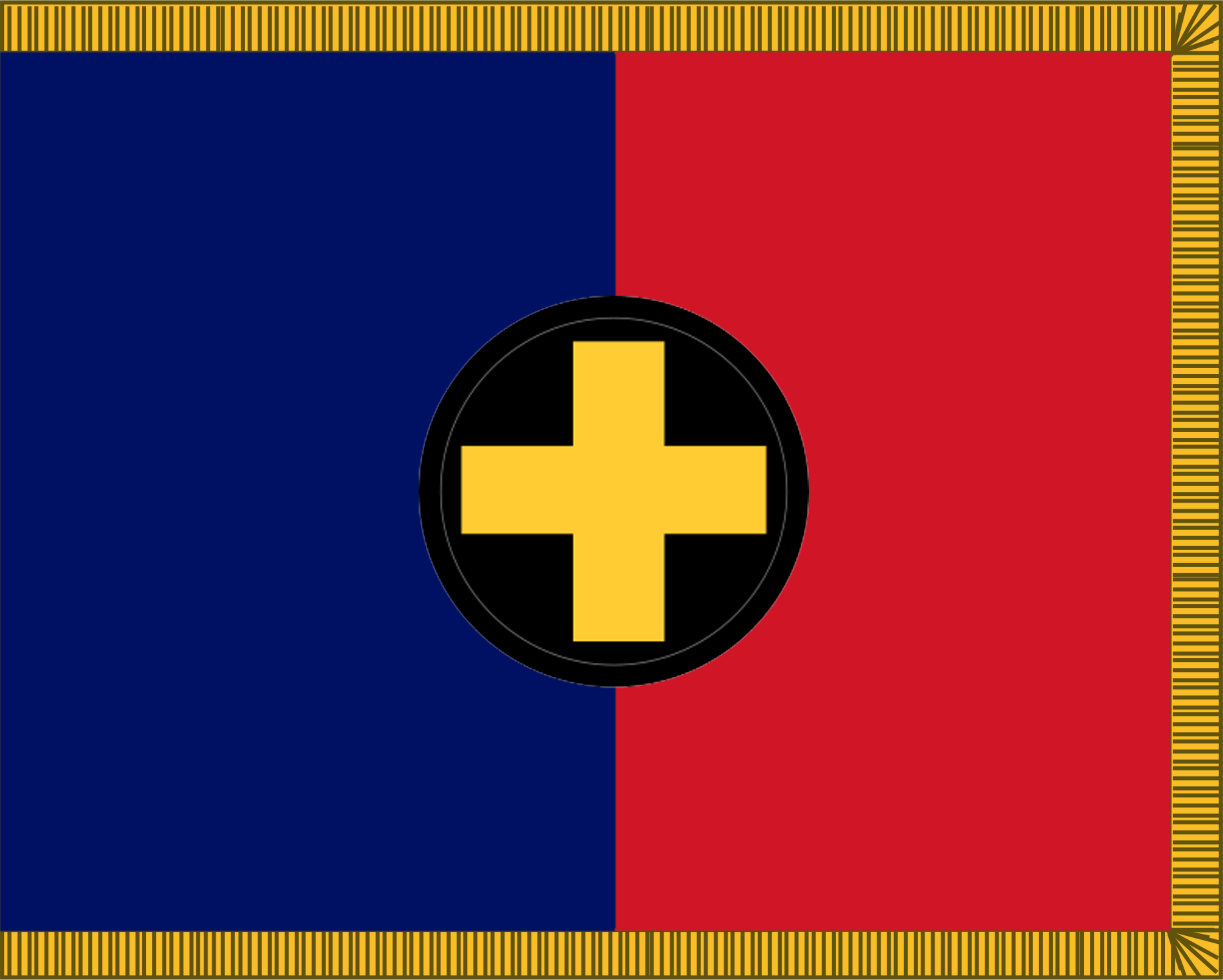
- 33rd Infantry Brigade Combat Team Flag

The 33rd Infantry Brigade Combat Team is a unit of the Illinois Army National Guard, which perpetuates the history of the 33rd Infantry Division. Known as the 66th Infantry Brigade until 2005, it is one of the brigades of the 35th Infantry Division. The brigade was re-activated under the Transformation of the United States Army and subordinated to the Illinois Army National Guard. The 33rd Infantry Brigade Combat Team deployed to Afghanistan in December 2008 in support of Operation Enduring Freedom and re-deployed in September 2009.

== History ==
The post-World War II reorganization of the Army National Guard included the 33rd and 44th Infantry Divisions as Illinois-based units.

The 44th Infantry Division was inactivated in 1954, following its return from its mobilization for the Korean War.

The 33rd Infantry Division continued until 1968, when it was inactivated as part of a National Guard force reduction. The 33rd Infantry Brigade was then created as a non-divisional organization.

The 66th Infantry Brigade, which had been part of the 44th Division and then the 33rd, continued in service as an Illinois organization assigned to the 47th Infantry Division. The 47th Division was inactivated in 1991, and the 66th Brigade was assigned to the 34th Infantry Division.

In 1997, the 66th Brigade was reassigned to the 35th Infantry Division.

As part of the Army's conversion to modular divisions and brigades in 2005, the separate 33rd Infantry Brigade was inactivated. The 66th Brigade was re-flagged as the 33rd Infantry Brigade Combat Team, which continued to be aligned with the 35th Division.

== Recent deployments ==
Soldiers of the 66th Brigade were activated for homeland security duty following the September 11th, 2001 terrorist attacks.

In 2008 and 2009, soldiers of the 33d Infantry Brigade Combat Team served in the War in Afghanistan.

In 2019-2020 Det 1, 2d Battalion, 122d Field Artillery Regiment supported the 1st Battalion, 178th Infantry Regiment from the 33d Infantry Brigade Combat Team in the War in Afghanistan under Resolute Support- Operation Freedom Sentinel.

== Organization 2025 ==
As of February 2026 the 33rd Infantry Brigade Combat Team consists of the following units of the Illinois Army National Guard and Puerto Rico Army National Guard:

- 33rd Infantry Brigade Combat Team, in Urbana (part of 38th Infantry Division)
  - Headquarters and Headquarters Company, 33rd Infantry Brigade Combat Team, in Urbana
  - 2nd Squadron, 106th Cavalry Regiment, in Kewanee
    - Headquarters and Headquarters Troop, 2nd Squadron, 106th Cavalry Regiment, in Kewanee
    - Troop A, 2nd Squadron, 106th Cavalry Regiment, in Pontiac
    - Troop B, 2nd Squadron, 106th Cavalry Regiment, in Dixon
    - Troop C (Dismounted), 2nd Squadron, 106th Cavalry Regiment, in Aurora
  - 2nd Battalion, 130th Infantry Regiment, in Marion
    - Headquarters and Headquarters Company, 2nd Battalion, 130th Infantry Regiment, in Marion
    - Company A, 2nd Battalion, 130th Infantry Regiment, in Marion
    - Company B, 2nd Battalion, 130th Infantry Regiment, in Effingham
    - Company C, 2nd Battalion, 130th Infantry Regiment, in Litchfield
    - Company D (Weapons), 2nd Battalion, 130th Infantry Regiment, in Mount Vernon
  - 1st Battalion, 178th Infantry Regiment, in Chicago
    - Headquarters and Headquarters Company, 1st Battalion, 178th Infantry Regiment, in Chicago
    - Company A, 1st Battalion, 178th Infantry Regiment, in Bartonville
    - Company B, 1st Battalion, 178th Infantry Regiment, in Elgin
    - Company C, 1st Battalion, 178th Infantry Regiment, in Kankakee
    - Company D (Weapons), 1st Battalion, 178th Infantry Regiment, in Woodstock
  - 1st Battalion, 296th Infantry Regiment, in Mayagüez (PR) (Puerto Rico Army National Guard)
    - Headquarters and Headquarters Company, 1st Battalion, 296th Infantry Regiment, in Mayagüez (PR)
    - Company A, 1st Battalion, 296th Infantry Regiment, in Utuado (PR)
    - Company B, 1st Battalion, 296th Infantry Regiment, in Mayagüez (PR)
    - Company C, 1st Battalion, 296th Infantry Regiment, in Cabo Rojo (PR)
    - Company D (Weapons), 1st Battalion, 296th Infantry Regiment, in Mayagüez (PR)
  - 2nd Battalion, 122nd Field Artillery Regiment, in Chicago
    - Headquarters and Headquarters Battery 2nd Battalion, 122nd Field Artillery Regiment, in Chicago
      - Detachment 1, Headquarters and Headquarters Battery, 2nd Battalion, 122nd Field Artillery Regiment, in Chicago (supports 1st Battalion, 178th Infantry Regiment)
      - Detachment 2, Headquarters and Headquarters Battery, 2nd Battalion, 122nd Field Artillery Regiment, in Urbana (supports 33rd Infantry Brigade Combat Team)
      - Detachment 3, Headquarters and Headquarters Battery, 2nd Battalion, 122nd Field Artillery Regiment, in Marion (supports 2nd Battalion, 130th Infantry Regiment)
      - Detachment 4, Headquarters and Headquarters Battery, 2nd Battalion, 122nd Field Artillery Regiment, in Kewanee (supports 2nd Squadron, 106th Cavalry Regiment)
    - Battery A, 2nd Battalion, 122nd Field Artillery Regiment, in Sycamore (M119A3)
    - Battery B, 2nd Battalion, 122nd Field Artillery Regiment, at Crestwood (M119A3)
    - Battery C, 2nd Battalion, 122nd Field Artillery Regiment, in Chicago (M777A2)
  - 766th Brigade Engineer Battalion, in Decatur
    - Headquarters and Headquarters Company, 766th Brigade Engineer Battalion, in Decatur
    - Company A (Combat Engineer), 766th Brigade Engineer Battalion, in Marseilles
    - Company B (Combat Engineer), 766th Brigade Engineer Battalion, in Marseilles
    - Company C (Signal), 766th Brigade Engineer Battalion, in Urbana
    - Company D (Military Intelligence), 766th Brigade Engineer Battalion, in Bloomington
      - Detachment 1, Company D (Military Intelligence), 766th Brigade Engineer Battalion, at Peoria Air National Guard Base (RQ-28A UAV)
  - 634th Brigade Support Battalion, in Sullivan
    - Headquarters and Headquarters Company, 634th Brigade Support Battalion, in Sullivan
    - Company A (Distribution), 634th Brigade Support Battalion, in Mattoon
    - Company B (Maintenance), 634th Brigade Support Battalion, in Urbana
    - Company C (Medical), 634th Brigade Support Battalion, in Springfield
    - Company D (Forward Support), 634th Brigade Support Battalion, in Galva — attached to 2nd Squadron, 106th Cavalry Regiment
    - Company E (Forward Support), 634th Brigade Support Battalion, in Decatur — attached to 766th Brigade Engineer Battalion
    - Company F (Forward Support), 634th Brigade Support Battalion, in Crestwood — attached to 2nd Battalion, 122nd Field Artillery Regiment
    - Company G (Forward Support), 634th Brigade Support Battalion, in Joliet — attached to 1st Battalion, 178th Infantry Regiment
    - Company H (Forward Support), 634th Brigade Support Battalion, in Mount Vernon — attached to 2nd Battalion, 130th Infantry Regiment
    - Company I (Forward Support), 634th Brigade Support Battalion, in Mayagüez (PR) — attached to 1st Battalion, 296th Infantry Regiment (Puerto Rico Army National Guard)

== In popular culture ==
The 33rd Infantry Brigade Combat team is depicted at various times in its history in the artwork entitled "Forever, My Brother" by Marc Wolfe.

The brigade is depicted in the movie, How It Ends, operating a roadblock on I-90 west.

The brigade is routinely seen in archival footage, performing crowd control duties during the protests that accompanied the 1968 Democratic National Convention.

The brigade is also depicted in the movie Public Enemies and are guarding the Lake County Indiana County Jail while John Dillinger escapes the jail in the Sheriffs squad car.

== External resources ==
- 33rd Infantry Brigade Combat team at Illinois National Guard
- 33rd Infantry Brigade Combat Team at Facebook
