= 123rd Field Artillery Regiment =

- Coat of arms
- Active: 1882– present
- Country: United States
- Branch: United States Army
- Type: Field artillery
- Role: USARS parent regiment
- Size: regiment

Insignia
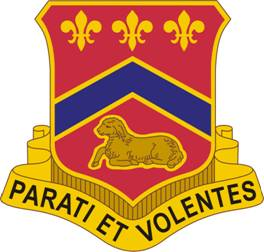
- Distinctive unit insignia

The 123rd Field Artillery Regiment is an active Field Artillery Branch regiment of the Illinois Army National Guard. The regiment's 2nd Battalion last served as a towed, 155mm cannon battalion assigned to the 169th Field Artillery Brigade, though administratively under the control of the 65th Troop Command.

On 31 August 2016, the 2nd Battalion was officially inactivated, after casing its colors on 13 August. It transitioned to the 123rd Engineer Battalion, which was activated on 22 September 2017. The 123rd Engineer Battalion was split in the Fall of 2018 resulting in the reactivation of the 2nd Battalion as a Field Artillery unit. The 2nd Battalion is currently assigned to the 45th Field Artillery Brigade and is under the administrative control of the 65th Troop Command Brigade.

== Lineage and honors ==
=== Lineage ===
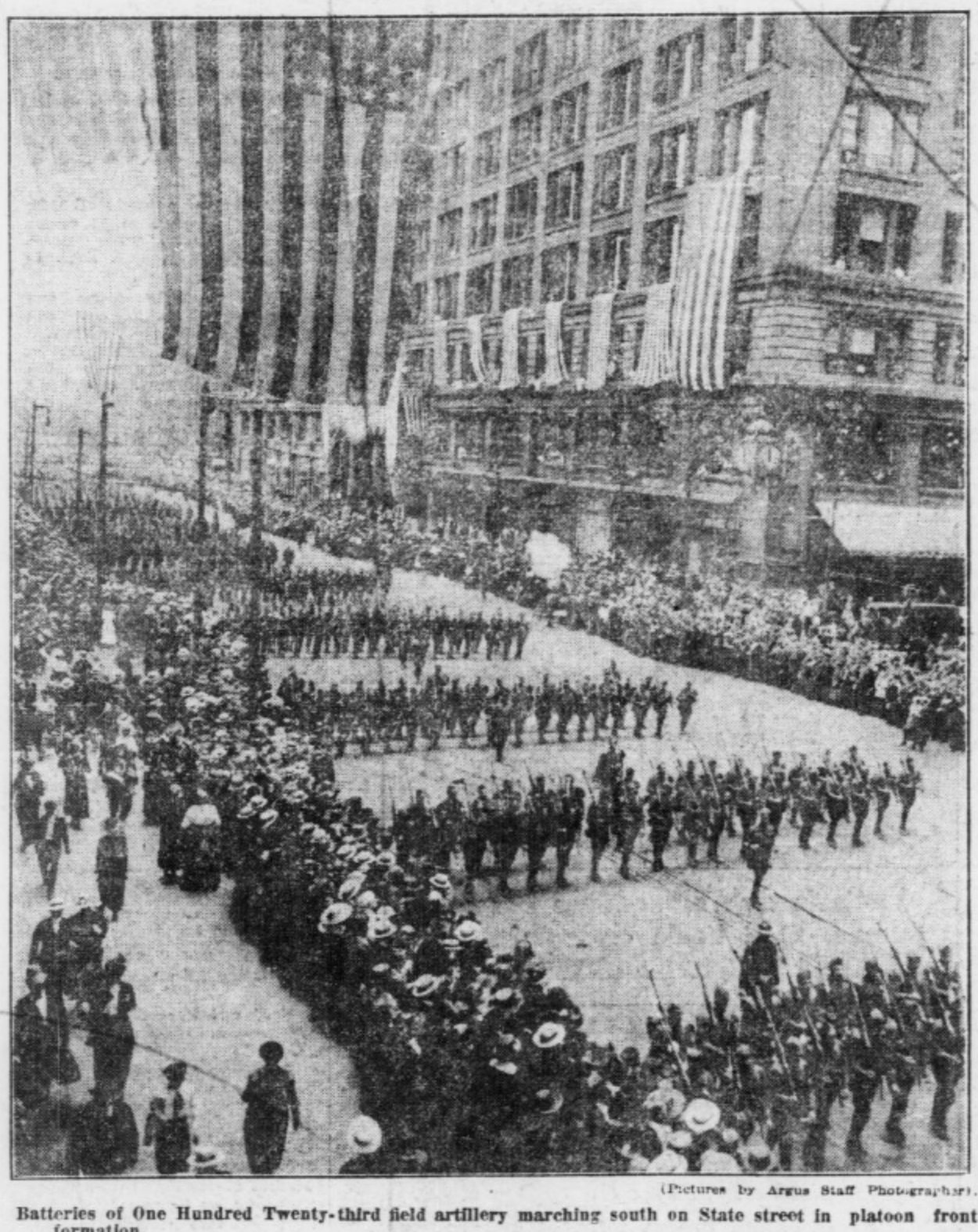
123rd Field Artillery parades in Chicago 1919

- Constituted 4 May 1882 in the Illinois National Guard as the 6th Infantry Regiment and organized from existing units in northwestern Illinois.
- Mustered into Federal service 11 May 1898 as the 6th Illinois Volunteer Infantry; mustered out of Federal service 25 November 1898 at Springfield
- Reorganized in 1903 in the Illinois National Guard as the 6th Infantry
- Mustered into Federal service 25 April 1917 at home stations; drafted into Federal service 5 August 1917.
- Converted, reorganized and redesignated 19 September 1917 as the 123d Field Artillery and assigned to the 33d Division
- Demobilized 9 June 1919 at Camp Grant, Illinois
- Reorganized 17 August 1921 in the Illinois National Guard as the 1st Battalion, 123d Field Artillery, an element of the 33d Division.
- Expanded, reorganized, and redesignated 3 June 1936 as the 123d Field Artillery; Headquarters Federally recognized 26 July 1936 at Monmouth
- Inducted into Federal service 5 March 1941 at home stations
- Regiment broken up 12 February–18 April 1942 and its elements reorganized and redesignated as follows:

- Headquarters and Headquarters Battery on 12 February 1942 as Headquarters and Headquarters Battery, 208th Field Artillery,

and relieved from assignment to the 33d Division

- 1st Battalion on 12 February 1942 as the 123d Field Artillery Battalion and remained assigned to the 33d Division (later

redesignated as the 33d Infantry Division)

- 2d Battalion on 18 April 1942 as the 2d Battalion, 200th Field Artillery, and relieved from assignment to the 33d Division

- After 18 April 1942 the above units underwent changes as follows:

- Headquarters and Headquarters Battery, 208th Field Artillery, reorganized and redesignated 1 March 1943 as Headquarters and Headquarters Battery, 208th Field Artillery Group
- Inactivated 27 March 1945 at Camp Shanks, New York
- Reorganized and Federally recognized 17 December 1946 in the Illinois National Guard at Monmouth as Headquarters and Headquarters Battery, 44th Division Artillery
- Ordered into active Federal service 15 February 1952 at Monmouth
- Released 10 October 1954 from active Federal service and reverted to state control; concurrently consolidated

with Headquarters Battery and Service Battery, 210th Field Artillery Battalion (organized and Federally recognized 1 March 1954 at Monmouth), and consolidated unit designated as Headquarters Battery and Service Battery, 210th Field Artillery Battalion, elements of the 33d Infantry Division

- 123d Field Artillery Battalion inactivated 5 February 1946 in Japan Relieved 5 July 1946 from assignment to the 33d Infantry Division and assigned to the 44th Infantry Division
- Expanded, reorganized, and Federally recognized 4 and 10 April 1947 in the Illinois National Guard as the 223d Field Artillery Battalion, with headquarters at Rock Island, and the 123d Field Artillery Battalion, with headquarters at Monmouth, elements of the 44th Infantry Division
- Location of headquarters, 123d Field Artillery Battalion, changed 16 June 1949 to Galesburg
- 123d and 223d Field Artillery Battalions ordered into Federal service 15 February 1952 at home stations
- Released from active Federal service 10 October 1954 and reverted to state control; 223d Field Artillery Battalion concurrently consolidated with the 133d Antiaircraft Artillery Battalion (organized and Federally recognized 1 March 1954 with headquarters at Rock Island) and consolidated unit designated as the 133d Antiaircraft Artillery Battalion, an element of the 33d Infantry Division
- 123d Field Artillery Battalion consolidated 1 December 1954 with the 209th Field Artillery Battalion (see below) and the 210th Field Artillery Battalion (organized and Federally recognized 1 March 1954 with headquarters at Monmouth) and consolidated unit designated as the 123d Field Artillery Battalion, an element of the 33d Infantry Division
- 2d Battalion, 208th Field Artillery, reorganized and redesignated 15 August 1942 as the 223d Field Artillery Battalion
- Assigned 6 December 1942 to the Americal Division
- Relieved 26 February 1943 from assignment to the Americal Division
- Inactivated 24 December 1945 at Camp Anza, California
- Reorganized and Federally recognized 17 March 1947 in the Illinois National Guard as the 209th Field Artillery Battalion, with headquarters at East St. Louis, and assigned to the 44th Infantry Division
- Ordered into active Federal service 15 February 1952 at home stations; released from active Federal service 10 October 1954 and reverted to state control

- 123d Field Artillery Battalion and the 133d Antiaircraft Artillery Battalion consolidated 1 March 1959 to form the 123d Artillery, a parent regiment under the Combat Arms Regimental System, to consist of the 1st Rocket Howitzer Battalion and the 2d Howitzer Battalion, elements of the 33d Infantry Division
- Reorganized 1 April 1963 to consist of the 1st and 2d Battalions, elements of the 33d Infantry Division
- Reorganized 1 February 1968 to consist of the 2d Battalion, an element of the 47th Infantry Division

(2d Battalion ordered into active Federal service 7 April 1968 at home stations; released 12 April 1968 from active Federal service and reverted to state control.)

- Redesignated 1 May 1972 as the 123d Field Artillery
- Withdrawn 5 February 1987 from the Combat Arms Regimental System and reorganized under the United States Army Regimental System
- Reorganized 10 February 1991 to consist of the 2d Battalion, an element of the 34th Infantry Division
- Reorganized 1 October 1996 to consist of the 2d Battalion, an element of the 34th Infantry Division, and the 3d Battalion
- Reorganized 1 October 1997 to consist of the 2d and 3d Battalions

(3d Battalion ordered into active Federal service 30 January 2003 at home stations)
(2d Battalion ordered into active Federal service 24 October–27 December 2004 at home stations)
(3d Battalion released from active Federal service 28 January 2005 and reverted to state control)

- Redesignated 1 October 2005 as the 123d Field Artillery Regiment

(2d Battalion released from active Federal service 21 April – 26 June 2006 and reverted to state control)

- Reorganized 1 September 2006 to consist of the 2d Battalion
- Ordered into active Federal service 20 May 2010 at home stations; released from active Federal service 23 June 2011 and reverted to state control
- Deactivated 31 August 2016
- Reactivated 1 September 2018

=== Campaign participation credit ===
- War with Spain: Puerto Rico
- World War I: St. Mihiel; Meuse-Argonne; Lorraine 1918
- World War II: New Guinea; Normandy; Northern France; Rhineland; Luzon; Ardennes-Alsace; Central Europe
- War on Terrorism; Campaigns to be determined

Headquarters Battery (Milan), 2d Battalion, additionally entitled to:
- War on Terrorism: Global War on Terrorism

=== Decorations ===
- Philippine Presidential Unit Citation, Streamer embroidered 17 OCTOBER 1944 TO 4 JULY 1945

Battery A (Milan), 2d Battalion, additionally entitled to:
- Meritorious Unit Commendation (Army), Streamer embroidered IRAQ 2005
Battery B (Macomb), 2d Battalion, additionally entitled to:
- Meritorious Unit Commendation (Army), Streamer embroidered IRAQ 2004-2005
Battery C (Galesburg), 2d Battalion, additionally entitled to:
- Meritorious Unit Commendation (Army), Streamer embroidered IRAQ 2005-2006
- Meritorious Unit Commendation (Army), Streamer embroidered PACIFIC THEATER 1944-1945
- Meritorious Unit Commendation (Army), Streamer embroidered PACIFIC THEATER 1945

== Heraldry ==
=== Distinctive unit insignia ===
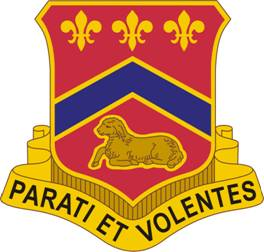

=== Coat of arms ===
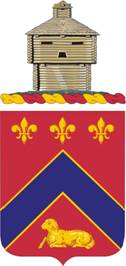
