= Milton J. Foreman =

United States Army general

- Foreman in 1916

Chicago Alderman
- In office 1901–1911 Serving with William S. Jackson (1901–1904); William J. Pringle (1904–1912)
- Preceded by: Albert R. Tearney
- Succeeded by: Frank Doubek
- Constituency: 3rd ward
- In office 1899–1901 Serving with William S. Jackson
- Preceded by: Abraham A. Ballenberg
- Succeeded by: Frank Doubek
- Constituency: 4th ward

Personal details
- Born: January 26, 1863 Chicago, Illinois, U.S.
- Died: October 16, 1935 (aged 72) Chicago, Illinois, U.S.
- Resting place: Rosehill Cemetery, Chicago, Illinois
- Party: Republican

Military service
- Allegiance: United States
- Branch/service: Illinois National Guard
- Years of service: 1895–1931
- Rank: Lt. Gen.
- Battles/wars: Spanish–American War; Border War; World War I
- Awards: Distinguished Service Cross; Distinguished Service Medal; Silver Star Citations; Legion of Honor; Belgian Order of the Crown

Milton J. Foreman (January 26, 1863 – October 16, 1935) was a Lieutenant General, who served as Commander in Chief of the Illinois National Guard. Prior to that, he led the 33rd Division, Illinois National Guard. Foreman attended the Paris Caucuses in 1919 of the American Legion as the Illinois representative and was one of its early leaders. He was also active in Illinois politics and served as a Chicago alderman.

== Early life ==
Foreman was born in Chicago to Mary (née Hoffman) and Joseph Foreman on January 26, 1863. The family lost all of their possessions in the Chicago Fire.

His first job was as an errand boy for Keith Brothers. He later worked for Keith Brothers as a salesman. Finally, he became a stockholder in the firm.

Foreman studied law at night.

== Civilian career ==
Having obtained his law degree, Foreman was admitted to the Illinois bar in 1899.

He served on Chicago's City Council. He was originally urged to run for alderman of the 4th ward by George S. Cole. From 1899 through 1900, he served on the city's Street Railway Commission He would be appointed to the council's Transportation Committee when it was formed in 1901.

Foreman was actively involved in organizing the Veterans' Repeal League, which advocated for the repeal of the 18th Amendment to the Constitution.

Foreman served as an appointed member of the Illinois State Liquor Control Commission.

== Military career ==
Foreman began his military career as a private, having enlisted with Troop C, First Cavalry of the Illinois National Guard, on December 5, 1895. He worked his way up the ranks.

During the Pancho Villa Expedition of the Border War, Col. Foreman commanded the First Cavalry of the Illinois National Guard. The unit mobilized quickly without its equipment and was briefly known as the "Horseless Cavalry". The unit equipped in the field.

To ensure early service in World War I, Col. Foreman appealed to the governor and obtained consent to convert the First Cavalry unit into field artillery. On June 20, 1917, a school in field artillery was instituted at the Chicago armory. The conversion went into effect on July 1, 1917, and the regiment became the Second Field Artillery, Illinois National Guard. The unit was ordered into national service on July 25, 1917. On September 21, it was designated the 122nd Field Artillery and assigned to the Fifty-eighth Field Artillery Brigade. Foreman commanded the field artillery regiment during its World War I service.

During World War I, his regiment received six unit citations.

=== Distinguished Service Cross ===
General Pershing recommended Foreman for the Distinguished Service Cross for his command efficiency during the Saint Mihiel and Meuse-Argonne offensives. On November 4, 1918, in an action near Ferme de Maucourt, northwest of Beauclair, France, his unit came under heavy machine gun and artillery fire. Foreman crept through the German gunfire laying telephone wire to the infantry front line so that he could direct the fire of his artillery unit by direct visual observation. He found the enemy positions and successfully called for fire support on the German units.

=== Distinguished Service Medal ===
The award citation reads: "For exceptionally meritorious and distinguished services. Commanding the 122nd Field Artillery, he gave proof of eminent technical attainments and assidious zeal. Though handicapped by many adverse conditions due to difficult terrain and determined hostile resistance, he kept his batteries in close support of the Infantry and thereby rendered services of inestimable value during the St. Mihiel Offensive.

=== Silver Star Citations ===
His first citation was for "gallantry in action near La Dhuy Ferme, northwest of Romagne, France, while conducting his regiment along a shell swept road in close support of the Infantry."

His second citation was for "Meuse-Argonne, September 26 to November 11, 1918." While commanding the 58th Field Artillery Brigade in action near Ferme de Maucourt on France, 4 November 1918, he crawled forward through a heavy enemy barrage in order to locate enemy machine guns and artillery that were holding up the Infantry.

=== After World War I ===
After World War I, Foreman continued his service with the Illinois National Guard. He was promoted to Brigadier General on June 23, 1920, and Major General on March 19, 1921. On his retirement in 1931, he was promoted to Lt. Gen.

== Awards ==
- Mexican Border Service Medal
- Distinguished Service Cross
- Distinguished Service Medal
- Silver Star Citations
- French Legion of Honor
- Belgian Order of the Crown

== American Legion ==
After World War I, Foreman was an active leader in the American Legion. He served on the Joint National Executive Committee of Thirty Four. Having presided as a temporary chairman at the caucuses in 1919, he was named a Past National Commander of the Legion in 1921. He was the National Executive Committeeman from Illinois for the years 1920–1922. He also served as chairman of the Legion's National Finance Committee in 1921. Foreman was active with this committee between 1920 and 1922.

== Personal life ==
Foreman collected rare books.

Foreman was a bachelor. He had four sisters, whom he supported financially.

== Death and legacy ==
Liberty ship S.S. Foreman

Foreman died in his home in Chicago on October 16, 1935. He was buried in Rosehill, Cemetery.

During World War II, he was honored by having a merchant liberty ship named the S.S. Foreman.
