= 122nd Field Artillery Regiment =

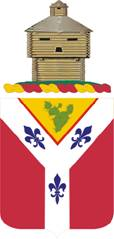
- Coat of arms
- Country: (United States)
- Branch: United States Army
- Type: Field artillery
- Role: USARS parent regiment
- Size: regiment

Insignia
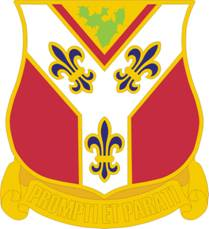
- Distinctive unit insignia

- Should Sleeve Insignia of the 33rd Brigade Combat Team

The 122nd Field Artillery Regiment is a field artillery regiment of the Illinois Army National Guard. The regiment's 2nd Battalion is the cannon battalion assigned to the 33rd Infantry Brigade Combat Team.

== History ==
The 2nd Battalion, 122nd Artillery was deployed to help suppress the April 1968 Chicago riots.Detachment 1, 1st Battalion, 122nd Artillery was deployed to Afghanistan in support of the 1-178 Infantry Battalion in support of Operation Freedoms Sentinel.

== Lineage and honors ==
=== Lineage ===
- Constituted 21 June 1893 in the Illinois National Guard as the 7th Infantry Regiment and organized at Chicago from the Hibernian Rifles, a former civilian-military organization
- Mustered into Federal service 18 May 1898 as the 7th Illinois Volunteer Infantry; mustered out of Federal service 20 October 1898 and resumed state status as the 7th Infantry Regiment
- Mustered into Federal service 27 June 1916; mustered out of Federal service 26 January 1917
- Drafted into Federal service 5 August 1917
- Converted and redesignated 12 October 1917 as the 108th Ammunition Train and 108th Supply Train and assigned to the 33d Division
- Demobilized 5 June 1919 at Camp Grant, Illinois
- Reorganized 26 June 1919 in the Illinois National Guard at Chicago as the 7th Infantry
- Converted, reorganized, and redesignated 1 May 1921 as the 2d Field Artillery
- Redesignated 13 September 1921 as the 124th Field Artillery and assigned to the 33d Division
- Inducted into Federal service 5 May 1941 at Chicago
- Regiment broken up 12 February 1942 and its elements reorganized and redesignated as follows: Headquarters and Headquarters Battery disbanded; 1st Battalion as the 1st Battalion, 208th Field Artillery, and relieved from assignment to the 33d Division; 2d Battalion as the 124th Field Artillery Battalion, an element of the 33d Infantry Division
- 1st Battalion, 208th Field Artillery, reorganized and redesignated 1 March 1943 as the 208th Field Artillery Battalion. Inactivated 9 April 1946 at Camp Kilmer, New Jersey. Assigned 5 July 1946 to the 33d Infantry Division. Reorganized and Federally recognized 15 March 1948 at Chicago
- 124th Field Artillery Battalion inactivated 5 February 1946 in Japan. Reorganized and Federally recognized 4 February 1947 at Chicago
- 208th and 124th Field Artillery Battalions consolidated 1 March 1959 with the 122d Field Artillery Battalion (see ANNEX) to form the 122d Artillery, a parent regiment under the Combat Arms Regimental System, to consist of the 1st, 2d, 3d, and 4th Howitzer Battalions, elements of the 33d Infantry Division
- Reorganized 1 April 1963 to consist of the 1st, 2d, and 3d Battalions, elements of the 33d Infantry Division
- Reorganized 1 February 1968 to consist of the 2d Battalion, an element of the 33d Infantry Brigade
- Redesignated 1 May 1972 as the 122d Field Artillery
- Withdrawn 5 February 1987 from the Combat Arms Regimental System and reorganized under the United States Army Regimental System
- Reorganized 1 September 1996 to consist of the 2d Battalion, an element of the 34th Infantry Division
- Reorganized 1 October 1997 to consist of the 2d Battalion, an element of the 35th Infantry Division
- Ordered into active Federal service 16 November 2003 at home stations; released from active Federal service 13 May 2005 and reverted to state control
- Redesignated 1 October 2005 as the 122d Field Artillery Regiment
- Relieved 1 September 2006 from assignment to the 35th Infantry Division and assigned to the 33d Infantry Brigade Combat Team

Ordered into active Federal service 2 October 2008 at home stations; released from active Federal service 5 November 2009 and reverted to state control

ANNEX

- Constituted 1 July 1897 in the Illinois National Guard as a squadron of cavalry and organized from existing elements
- Expanded, reorganized, and mustered into Federal service 21 May 1898 at Springfield as the 1st Illinois Volunteer Cavalry; mustered out of Federal service 11 October 1898 at Fort Sheridan, Illinois
- Reorganized in 1899 in the Illinois National Guard as a squadron of cavalry. Expanded, reorganized, and redesignated 22 June 1899 as the 1st Cavalry
- Mustered into Federal service 27 June 1916; mustered out of Federal service 17 November 1916 at Fort Sheridan, Illinois.
- Chicago elements of the regiment converted and redesignated 9 June 1917 as the 2d Field Artillery (non-Chicago elements converted and redesignated 24 June 1917 as the 3d Field Artillery – hereafter separate lineage)
- Field Artillery drafted into Federal service 5 August 1917
- Reorganized and redesignated 21 September 1917 as the 122d Field Artillery and assigned to the 33d Division
- Demobilized 7–8 June 1919 at Camp Grant, Illinois
- Reorganized 11 November 1921 in the Illinois National Guard at Chicago as the 1st Field Artillery
- Redesignated 13 September 1921 as the 122d Field Artillery and assigned to the 33d Division
- Inducted into Federal service 5 March 1941 at Chicago
- Regiment broken up 12 February 1942 and its elements reorganized and redesignated as follows:
  - Headquarters and Headquarters Battery disbanded
  - 1st Battalion as the 122d Field Artillery Battalion, an element of the 33d Infantry Division; (remainder of regiment – hereafter separate lineages)
  - 122d Field Artillery Battalion inactivated 5 February 1946 in Japan Consolidated 18 December 1946 with Headquarters and Headquarters Battery, 122d Field Artillery (concurrently reconstituted in the Illinois National Guard) and consolidated unit reorganized and Federally recognized at Chicago as the 122d Field Artillery Battalion

=== Campaign participation credit ===
- World War I: St. Mihiel; Meuse-Argonne; Lorraine 1918
- World War II: Normandy; Northern France; Rhineland; Ardennes-Alsace; Central Europe; New Guinea; Luzon
- War on Terrorism
  - Afghanistan: Consolidation II

(additional campaigns to be determined)

=== Decorations ===
- Philippine Presidential Unit Citation, Streamer embroidered 17 OCTOBER 1944 TO 4 JULY 1945

Headquarters Battery (Chicago), 2d Battalion, additionally entitled to:
- Meritorious Unit Commendation (Army), Streamer embroidered PACIFIC THEATER 1944-1945
- Meritorious Unit Commendation (Army), Streamer embroidered PACIFIC THEATER 1945

== Heraldry ==
=== Distinctive unit insignia ===
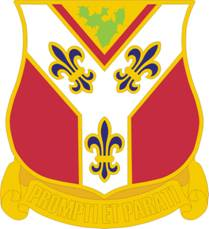

=== Coat of arms ===
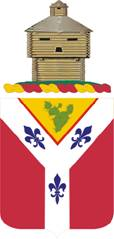

== See also ==
- Field Artillery Branch (United States)
