= 518th Sustainment Brigade (United States) =

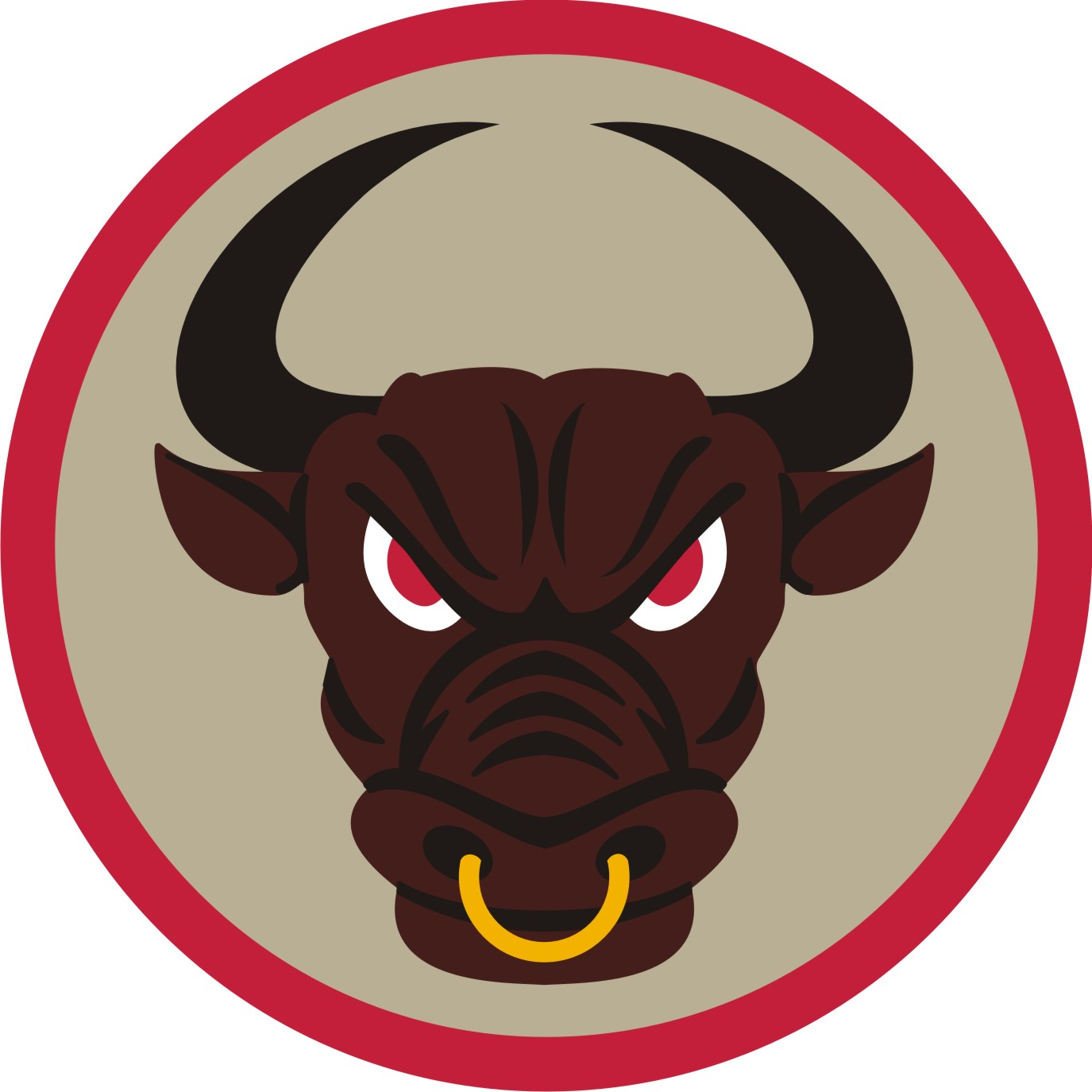
- 518th Sustainment Brigade shoulder sleeve insignia
- Country: United States
- Branch: United States Army Reserve
- Type: Sustainment Brigade
- Size: Brigade
- Part of: 143rd Expeditionary Sustainment Command
- Motto: "Sustain The Attack"

Commanders
- Current commander: COL KAREN A. SCHLOBOHM

Insignia
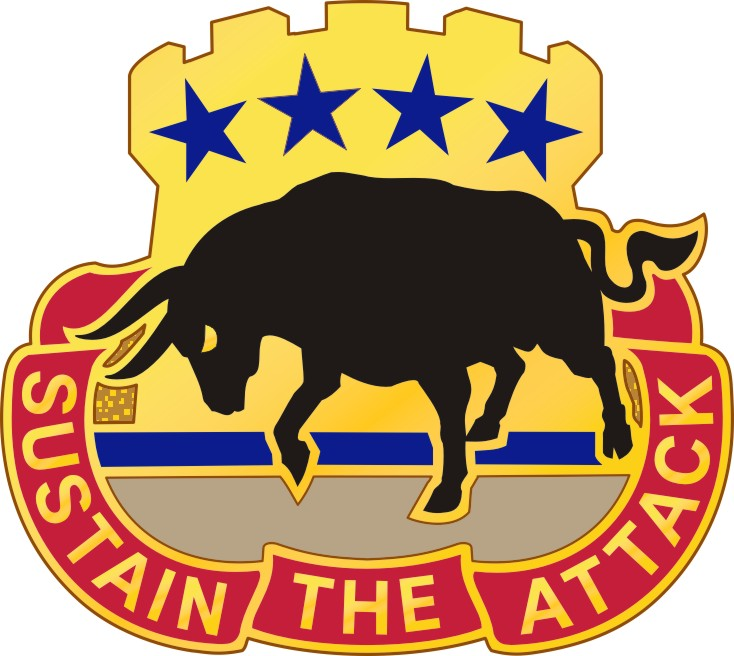
- Distinctive unit insignia

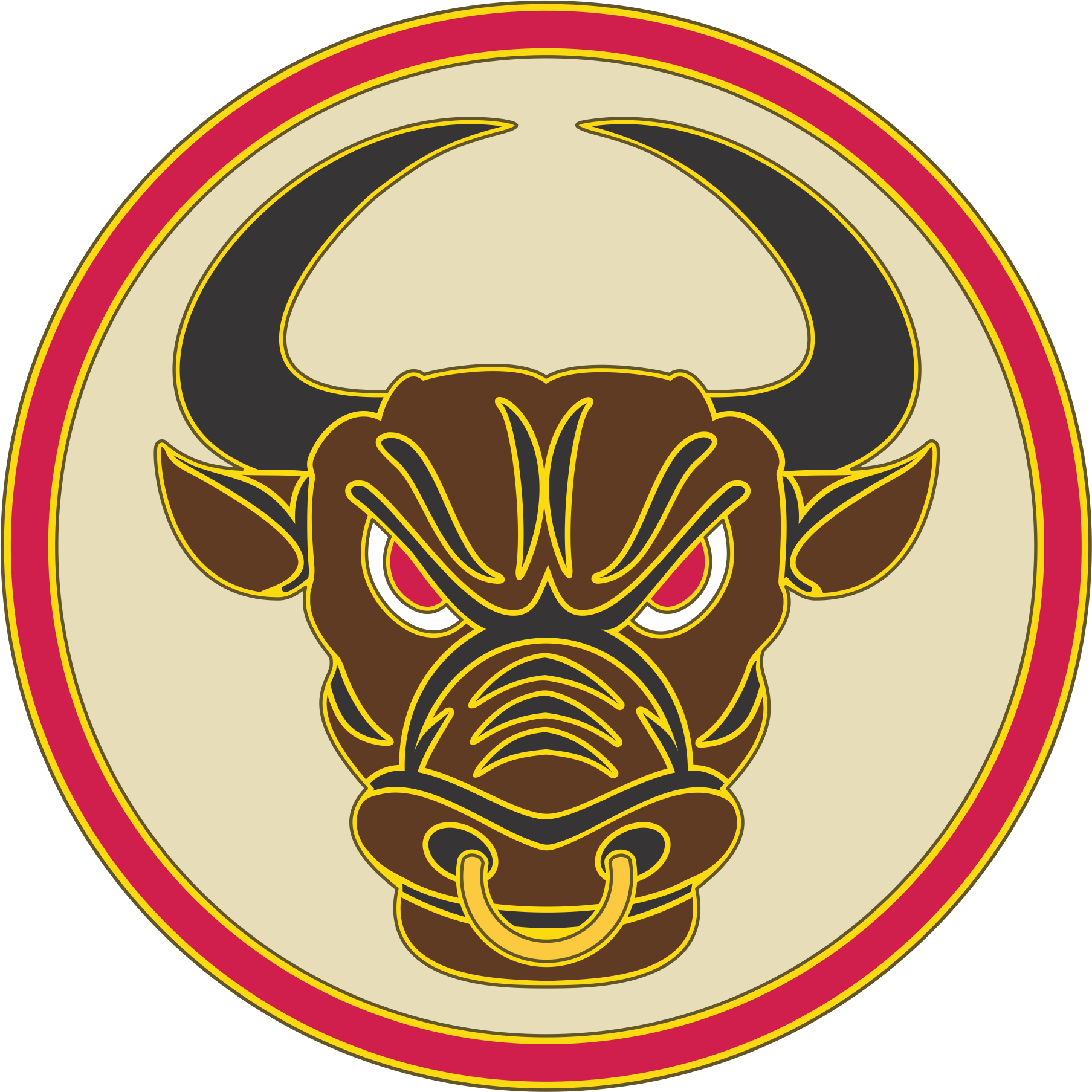
- Combat Service Identification Badge

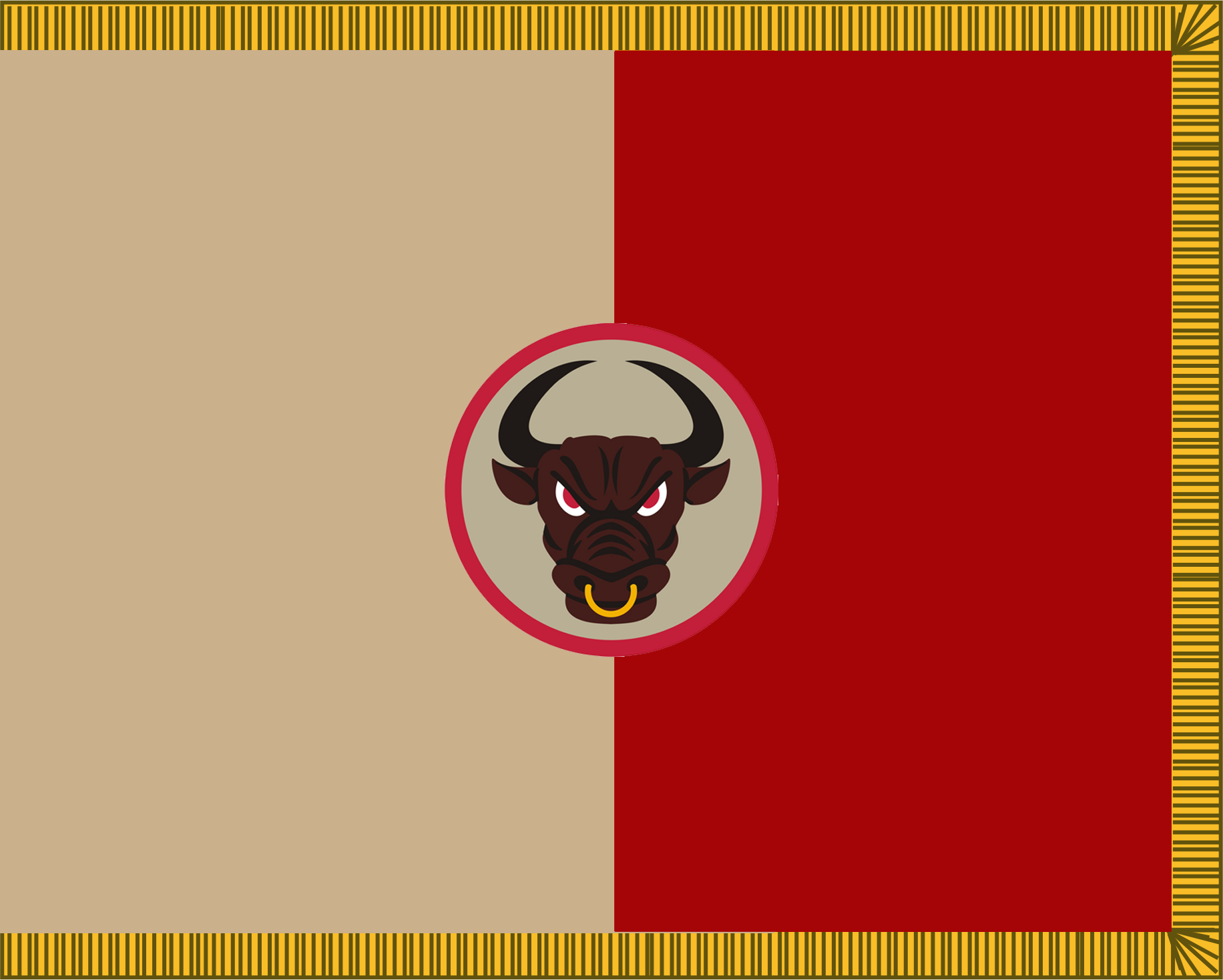
- 518th Sustainment Brigade Flag

The 518th Sustainment Brigade is a sustainment brigade of the United States Army Reserve headquartered in Knightdale, North Carolina. The unit, having completed a tour of duty as the Sustainment Brigade for Resolute Support Mission, transferred authority to 1st Cavalry Division Sustainment Brigade on 17 September 2016.

== Organization ==
The brigade is a subordinate unit of the 143rd Expeditionary Sustainment Command. As of January 2026 the brigade consists of the following units:

- 518th Sustainment Brigade, in Knightdale (NC)
  - 518th Special Troops Battalion, in Knightdale (NC)
    - Headquarters and Headquarters Company, 518th Sustainment Brigade, in Knightdale (NC)
    - 492nd Brigade Signal Company (MEB/CAB/SB), in Knightdale (NC)
  - 275th Combat Sustainment Support Battalion, at Fort Lee (VA)
    - Headquarters and Headquarters Company, 275th Combat Sustainment Support Battalion, at Fort Lee (VA)
    - 351st Ordnance Company (Ammo) (Modular), in Romney (WV)
      - 1st Platoon, 351st Ordnance Company (Ammo) (Modular), in Morgantown (WV)
      - 2nd Platoon, 351st Ordnance Company (Ammo) (Modular), in Martinsburg (WV)
    - 375th Quartermaster Company (Field Feeding), in Wilson (NC)
    - 460th Quartermaster Company (Supply), in Suffolk (VA)
    - 678th Human Resources Company, in Nashville (TN)
      - 2nd Platoon, 678th Human Resources Company, in Charlotte (NC)
      - 3rd Platoon, 678th Human Resources Company, in Louisville (KY)
    - 812th Human Resources Company, in Charlotte (NC)
      - 3rd Platoon, 812th Human Resources Company, in Brevard (NC)
    - 824th Quartermaster Company (Corps Aerial Delivery) (Airborne), at Fort Bragg (NC)
    - 861st Quartermaster Company (Theater Aerial Delivery) (Airborne), in Nashville (TN)
    - 1006th Quartermaster Company (Supply), in Knightdale (NC)
  - 352nd Combat Sustainment Support Battalion, in Macon (GA)
    - Headquarters and Headquarters Company, 352nd Combat Sustainment Support Battalion, in Macon (GA)
    - 231st Transportation Company (Inland Cargo Transfer Company — ICTC), in Athens (GA)
    - 346th Quartermaster Company (Theater Aerial Delivery) (Airborne), at Joint Forces Training Base – Los Alamitos (CA)
    - 377th Quartermaster Company (Petroleum Support), in Macon (GA)
      - 2nd Platoon, 377th Quartermaster Company (Petroleum Support), in Tifton (GA)
      - 3rd Platoon, 377th Quartermaster Company (Petroleum Support), in Athens (GA)
    - 421st Quartermaster Company (Corps Aerial Delivery) (Airborne), in Fort Valley (GA)
    - 514th Transportation Detachment (Trailer Transfer Point Team), in Statham (GA)
    - 802nd Ordnance Company (Ammo) (Modular), in Gainesville (GA)
      - 1st Platoon, 802nd Ordnance Company (Ammo) (Modular), at Fort Gillem (GA)
      - 2nd Platoon, 802nd Ordnance Company (Ammo) (Modular), in Aiken (SC)

== Decorations ==
1. Meritorious Unit Commendation for service 29 January 2016 to 29 September 2016
