= 137th Signal Company =

Signal Company

- Active: 1 September 2006 – present
- Country: United States
- Branch: U.S. Army Ohio National Guard
- Type: Signal Corps (United States Army)
- Size: Company
- Garrison/HQ: Springfield, Ohio
- Motto: ""

Commanders
- Current commander: CPT Mark Manibusan, 2021-Present
- Notable commanders: CPT Donald Flowers CPT Benjamin Murphy; CPT Evan Howard; CPT Kevin Kelchin, 2013-16; CPT Denise Stewart, 2016-18 CPT Brett Adamik, 2018-21

The 137th Signal Company is an Ohio Army National Guard Signal Company based out of Springfield, Ohio. The 137th Signal Company is a member of the 371st Special Troops Battalion, a member of the 371st Sustainment Brigade.

The 137th provides radio and satellite communications assets and expertise to the 371st Sustainment Brigade and its subordinate units. Members of the company are trained to provide reliable, secure, tactical communications in a variety of situations such as the battlefield, disaster relief, and standard infrastructure.

In general, a signal company is able to provide both line of sight (LOS) and beyond line of sight (BLOS) capabilities to supported units to enable both local and remote communication pathways. The 137th Signal Company also possesses disaster response capabilities through the Disaster Incident Response Emergency Communications Terminal (DIRECT) system, which enables National Guard signal units to provide commercial phone, internet access, and commercial Wi-Fi and 4G LTE to first responders.

== Location ==
The company relocated from Newark, Ohio to Springfield, Ohio in August 2021.

== History ==
The 137th Signal Company was constituted on September 1, 2006, as the Signal Detachment, 371st Sustainment Brigade. The Signal Company was reorganized and re-designated on November 1, 2011, as the 137th Signal Company.

The Signal Detachment supported President Obama's inauguration in January 2008.

The 137th Signal Company has responded to Hurricane Gustav (2008) and Hurricane Maria (2017) in Puerto Rico.

The 137th Signal Company participated in a Joint Readiness Training Center rotation in 2016.
