= 35th Division Sustainment Brigade =

- 35th Division Sustainment Brigade shoulder sleeve insignia
- Active: 2007 - Present
- Country: United States
- Allegiance: Tennessee
- Branch: United States Army
- Role: Sustainment
- Size: Brigade
- Part of: United States Army National Guard
- Headquarters: Chattanooga, TN
- Nickname: Old Hickory Volunteers (Special Designation)

Commanders
- Current commander: Col. Shane Tipton

Insignia
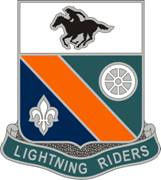
- Distinctive Unit Insignia

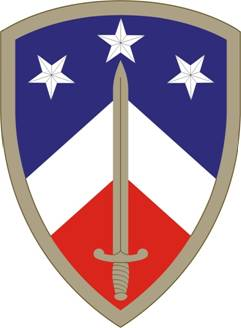
- Former SSI 230th Sustainment Brigade

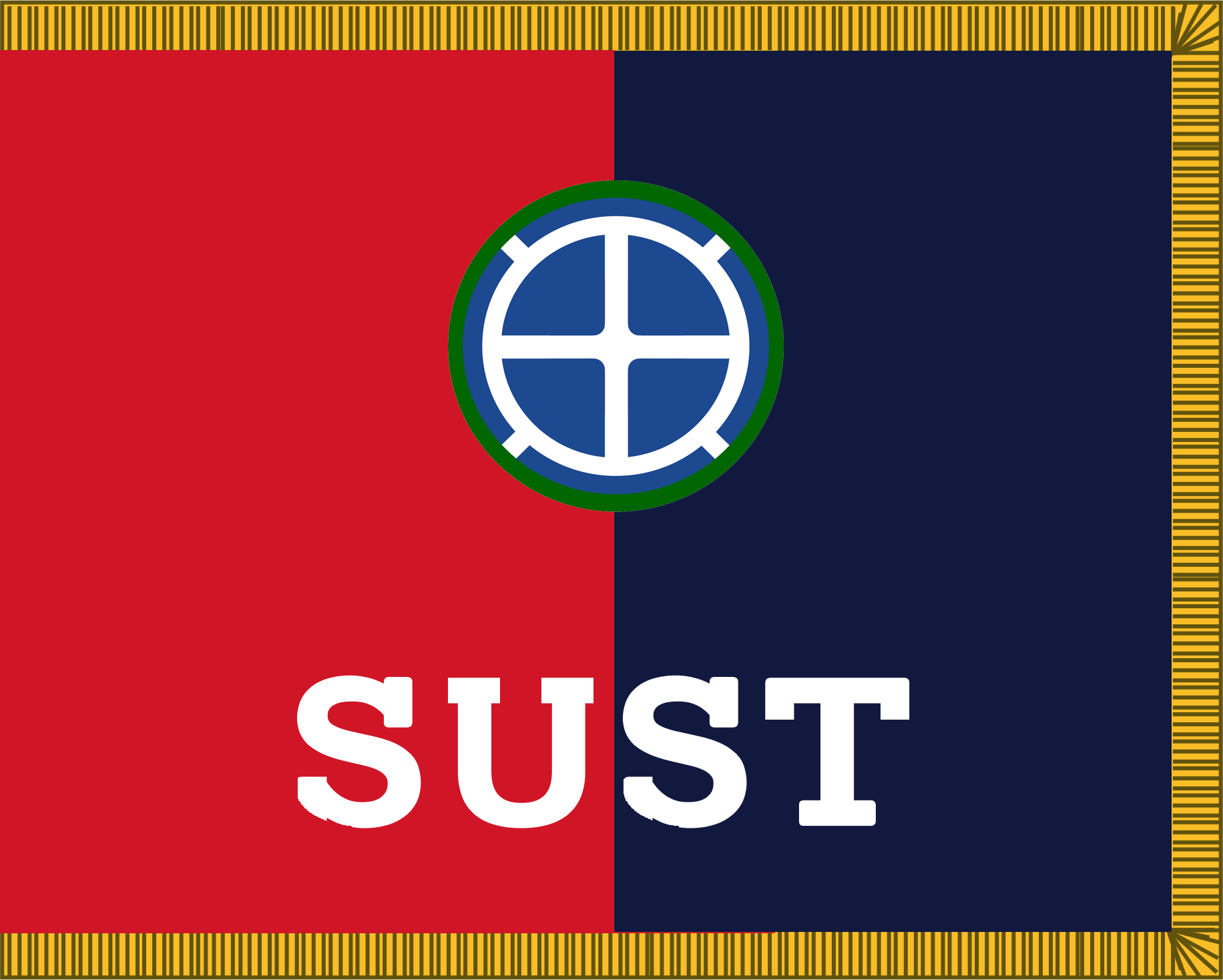
- 35th Division Sustainment Brigade Flag

The 35th Division Sustainment Brigade ("Volunteers") is a sustainment brigade of the Tennessee Army National Guard.

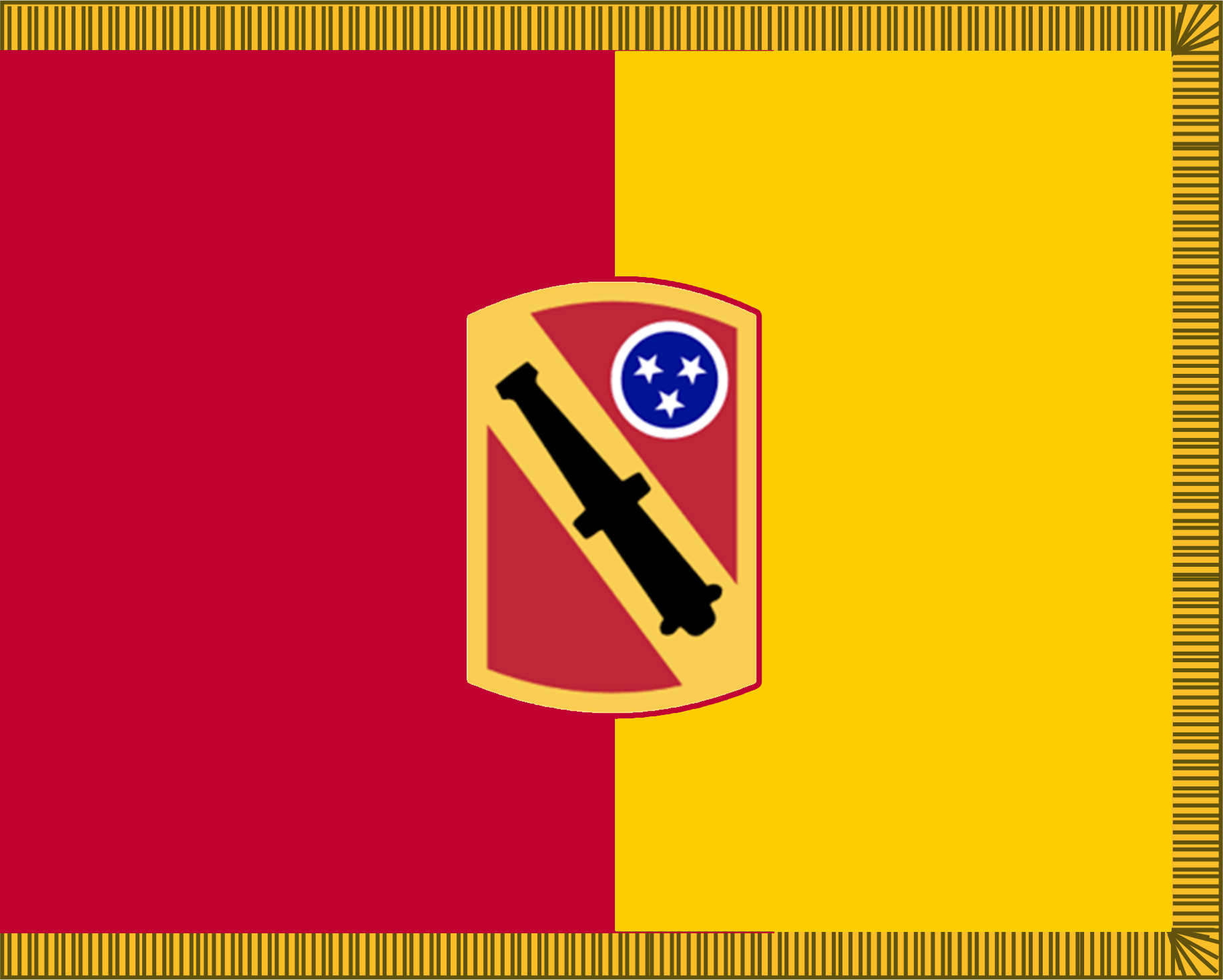
196th Field Artillery Brigade Flag

The Brigade formed in 2005, and gradually over three years assumed the lineage of long-time TN ARNG 196th Field Artillery Brigade based in Chattanooga, Tennessee. In July 2008 the 196th Field Artillery Brigade cased its colors, and it formally inactivated on 12 July 2008. From 2008 until 2024, the unit was the 230th Sustainment Brigade until it was repatched as the 35th Division Sustainment Brigade.

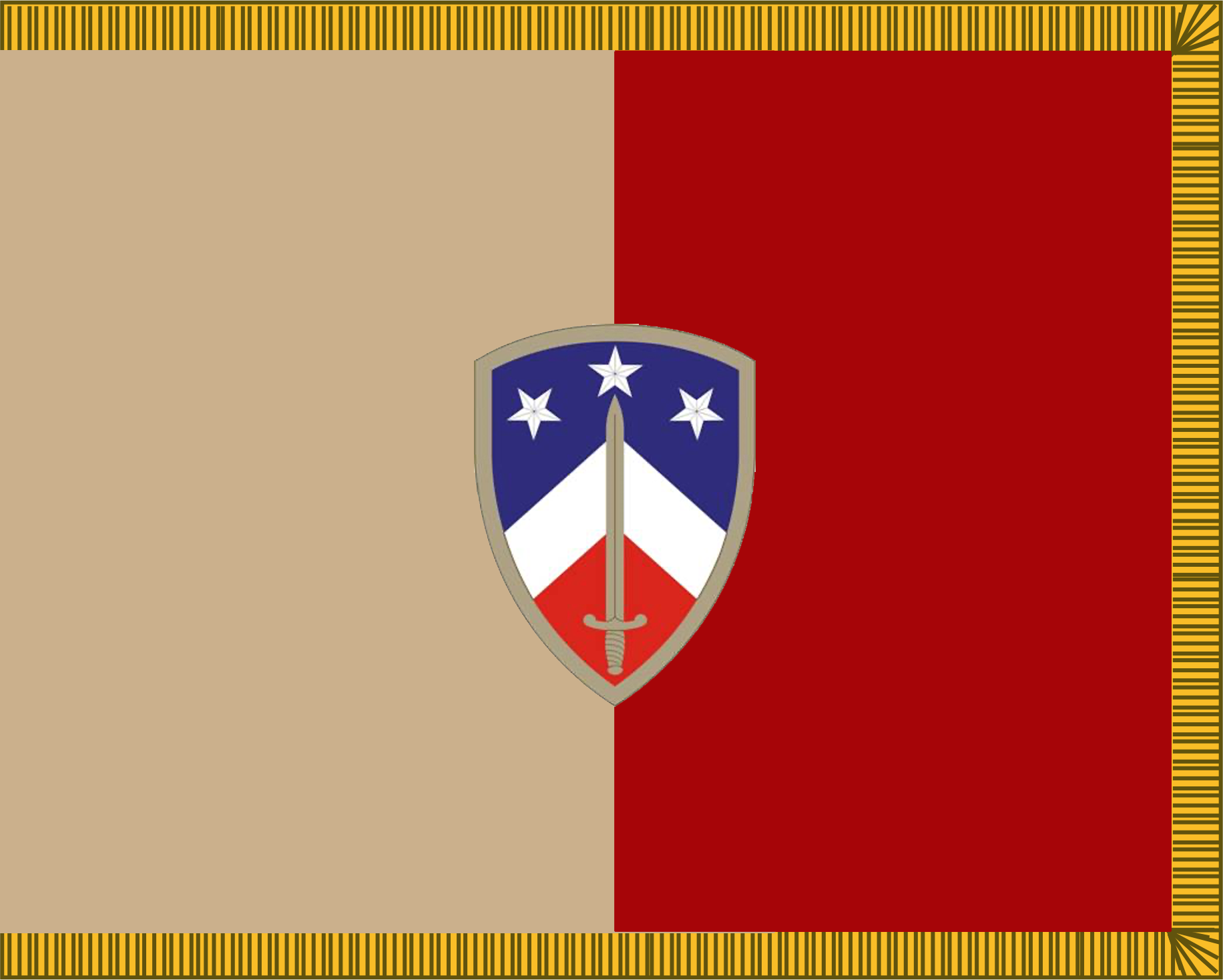
230th Sustainment Brigade Flag

The 1st Battalion, 181st Field Artillery, located at the Chattanooga Armory, was transferred from the 196th FA Brigade to the 35th Division Sustainment Brigade. The Brigade also includes the 176th Combat Sustainment Support Battalion based at Johnson City, which has participated in Joint Task Force East rotations in Romania and Bulgaria. The other subordinate battalion within the Brigade is the 30th Combat Sustainment Support Battalion. The 30th CSSB consisted of the following:

- 1171st Transportation Company of Dresden, TN and Tiptonville, TN cased its colors in 2017 whenever they stood up the 1172nd based on location in Waynesboro, TN and Memphis, TN
- 1172nd Transportation Company stood up in 2017 based on location in Waynesboro, TN and Memphis, TN
- 1174th Transportation Company
- 1175th Transportation Company based out of Brownsiville, TN and Tullahoma, TN
- 1176th Transportation Company based out of Dresden, TN ; Smyrna, TN ; and Johnson City, TN
- 777th Maintenance Company

In 2011 HHC, 35th Division Sustainment Brigade deployed to Kuwait where it assisted with the drawdown from Iraq.
