= Always Ready, Always There =

American military march

The "Always Ready, Always There!" refers to the official organizational march of the United States National Guard and the National Guard Bureau. It also serves as the component song of the Army and Air National Guard. It was composed in 2016 by Chief Warrant Officer 4 David Myers, director of the 40th Army Band in the Vermont Army National Guard. It replaced I Guard America, which was adopted in November 1999. Although the NGB March represents the Army and Air National Guard among the songs of agencies in the Department of Defense, it does not replace either The Army Goes Rolling Along or The U.S. Air Force, which are the service songs of the United States Army and the United States Air Force respectively. Instead, the march is played immediately after their respective service song is played at official ceremonies.

== Lyrics ==
Full Text
We are the Guard
Soldiers and Airmen all prepared
We are the National Guard
We serve on land and in the air
We go where duty calls
Around the world and here at home
Stand tall in the National Guard
Always Ready, Always There!
We represent our nation's best
Men and women serving true
In times of strife or nature's wrath
The Guard will always see us through!
We rise across the U.S.A.
From sea to sea our lands of air.
We're proud of the National Guard
Always Ready, Always There!
We serve the call around the world
Nation to nation we support
As friends we work in partnership
To train or fight as duty calls
While here at home, from state to state
Community service we prepare
We serve in the National Guard
Always Ready, Always There!

== Videos ==
- Always Ready, Always There on YouTube
