= Army National Guard =

Organized militia force and a federal military reserve force of the United States Army

- Seal of the Army National Guard
- Active: As state-funded militia under various names: 1636–1903; As federal reserve forces called the Army National Guard: 1903–present
- Country: United States
- Branch: United States Army
- Type: Reserve force Militia
- Role: Provide the Army with combat-ready reserve Army (Title 10) as well as protecting and supporting their respective states (Title 32)
- Size: 325,066 personnel (authorized end strength for Fiscal Year 2023)
- Part of: National Guard; National Guard Bureau; Reserve components of the United States Armed Forces
- Garrison/HQ: Army National Guard Readiness Center, Arlington Hall; Arlington County, Virginia
- Nicknames: "Army Guard", "The Guard"
- March: Always Ready, Always There
- Anniversaries: 13 December 1636 (founding)
- Equipment: List of equipment of the United States Army
- Website: army.mil/nationalguard nationalguard.com

Commanders
- Director: LTG Jonathan Stubbs
- Deputy Director: MG Joseph R. Baldwin
- Command Chief Warrant Officer: CW5 Brian Searcy
- Command Sergeant Major: CSM James B. Kendrick

The Army National Guard (ARNG) is an organized militia force and a federal military reserve force of the United States Army. It is simultaneously part of two different organizations: the Militia of the United States (consisting of the ARNG of each state, most territories, and Washington, D.C.), as well as the federal ARNG, as part of the National Guard as a whole (which includes the Air National Guard). It is divided into subordinate units stationed in each state or insular area, responsible to their respective governors or other head-of-government.

The Guard's origins are usually traced to the city of Salem, Massachusetts, in 1636. That year a regiment of militia drilled for the first time to defend a multi-community area within what is now the United States. (Note: The 181st Infantry, the 182nd Infantry, the 101st Field Artillery and the 101st Engineer Battalion of the Massachusetts Army National Guard stem from the 1636 unit.)

== Activation ==
The ARNG operates under Title 10 of the United States Code when under federal control, and Title 32 of the United States Code and applicable state laws when under state control. It may be called up for active duty by the state or territorial governors to help respond to domestic emergencies and disasters, such as those caused by hurricanes, floods, and earthquakes, as well as civil disorder. The District of Columbia Army National Guard is a federal militia, controlled by the president of the United States with authority delegated to the secretary of defense, and through him to the secretary of the Army.

Members or units of the National Guard may be ordered, temporarily or indefinitely, into the Regular U.S. Army. If mobilized for federal service, the member or unit becomes part of the U.S. ARNG, which is a reserve component of the U.S. Army. Individuals volunteering for active federal service may do so subject to the consent of their governors. Largely on the basis of a 1990 U.S. Supreme Court decision, governors generally cannot veto involuntary activations of individuals or units for federal service, either for training or national emergency.

The president may also call up members and units of the ARNG, in its status as the militia of the several states, to repel invasion, suppress rebellion, or enforce federal laws. The Army National Guard is one of two organizations administered by the National Guard Bureau, the other being the Air National Guard. The director of the ARNG is the head of the organization, and reports to the chief of the National Guard Bureau. Because the ARNG is both the militia of the several states and a federal reserve component of the Army, neither the chief of the National Guard Bureau nor the director of the ARNG "commands" it. This operational command authority is performed in each state or territory by the state adjutant general, and in the District of Columbia by the commanding general of the D.C. National Guard when a unit is in its militia status. While under federal activation, the operational command authority is transferred to the commanders of the unified combatant commands, who command all U.S. forces within their area of responsibility. The chief of the National Guard Bureau and the director of the ARNG serve as the channel of communications between the Department of the Army and the ARNG in each state and territory, and administer federal programs, policies, and resources for the National Guard.

The ARNG's portion of the president's proposed federal budget for the 2018 fiscal year is approximately $16.2 billion to support an end strength of 343,000, including appropriations for personnel pay and allowance, facilities maintenance, construction, equipment maintenance and other activities.

== History ==
The Army National Guard is constantly reorganizing. After the end of World War II, a large new land force for the National Guard was planned, to become the Army National Guard for the first time, as the new Air National Guard was just being established.

From November 1945, the Army Staff prepared a provisional postwar National Guard force list, including 24 divisions. It reached that total by counting the prewar 18 National Guard infantry and four National Guard cavalry divisions, the Americal Division (which had been largely composed of Guard units), and the 42nd Infantry Division. Most soldiers considered the 42nd Division, initially organized with state troops in 1917, as a Guard unit. The fact that the new plan allowed each of the forty-eight states to have at least one general officer also helped earn its acceptance. In the end it was necessary to approve a 27-division structure with 25 infantry divisions and 2 armored divisions to accommodate the desires of all the states. During this process New York, for example, successfully petitioned the War Department for the 42d Infantry Division. When the allotment was completed, the Guard contained the 26th through 48th and the 51st and 52d Infantry Divisions and the 49th and 50th Armored Divisions. The number 39 was used for the first time since 1923. Although a 44th Infantry Division had existed during the interwar years, the postwar 44th in Illinois was a new unit, as were the 46th, 47th, 48th, 51st, and 52d Infantry Divisions and 49th Armored Division. The 50th Armored Division replaced the 44th Infantry Division in New Jersey.

To prepare for challenges in Western Europe, the new troop basis of 1952 authorized the conversion of four National Guard infantry divisions to armored divisions. New York, California, Georgia, and Florida agreed to convert the 27th, 40th, and 48th Infantry Divisions. Later, Tennessee split off the 30th Armored Division from the existing 30th Infantry Division it had previously shared with North Carolina.

The 44th Division was disbanded in late 1954.

The 34th and 51st Divisions were disbanded in 1963. They both became Command Headquarters, Divisional, retaining a National Guard general officer position, to supervise training of combat and support units in the former division area. The 34th Division became a Command Headquarters (Divisional) on 1 MArch 1963. The 35th and 43rd Infantry Divisions also disappeared at the same time.

After the ROAD reorganisation, on 1 July 1965, the National Guard had 23 divisions.

The Department of Defense continued to scrutinize reserve forces. It questioned the number of divisions and brigades, as well as the need for maintaining two reserve components, the National Guard and the Army Reserve. In 1967, Secretary of Defense Robert McNamara decided that 15 combat divisions in the Army National Guard were unnecessary. He cut the number to eight divisions (one mechanized infantry, two armored, and five infantry), but increased the number of brigades from seven to 18 (one airborne, one armored, two mechanized infantry, and 14 infantry). Among the divisions inactivated were the 31st, 32nd, 33rd, 37th, 39th, 41st, 43rd, 45th, and 46th Infantry Divisions, and the 27th and 48th Armored Divisions. The loss of the divisions did not set well with the states. Their objections included the inadequate maneuver element mix for those that remained and the end to the practice of rotating divisional commands among the states that supported them. Under the proposal, the remaining division commanders were to reside in the state of the division base. No reduction, however, in total Army National Guard strength was to take place, which convinced the governors to accept the plan. The states reorganized their forces accordingly between 1 December 1967 and 1 May 1968.

The 31st Infantry and 30th Armored Divisions were inactivated in 1973-74.

Shoulder sleeve insignia of the 47th Infantry Division, inactivated in 1991

Shoulder sleeve insignia of the 50th Armored Division, inactivated in 1993

In the early 1990s, after the end of the Cold War, the force was cut once again. In the Northeast, the 26th Infantry Division and the 50th Armored Division were both inactivated on 1 September 1993. Several parts of both divisions were incorporated into a reorganized 42nd Infantry Division. The Northeast had frequently struggled to maintain three full Army National Guard divisions at a reasonable strength.

Many storied formations with valiant battle histories have obscure descendants in the mid-2020s. Some have been renamed or inactivated. Some have had subordinate units reallocated to other commands. A partial list of inactivated major formations includes:

- 27th Infantry Division, reorganized as 27th Armored Division, 1 February 1955. (See below.)
- 27th Armored Division, inactivated 1 February 1968.
- 30th Armored Division, inactivated 1 December 1973. (See below.)
- 30th Infantry Division, inactivated 4 January 1974.
- 31st Infantry Division, inactivated 14 January 1968. Units allocated to 30th Armored Division.
- 32nd Infantry Division, inactivated 1 December 1967.
- 33rd Infantry Division, inactivated 1 February 1968.
- 37th Infantry Division, inactivated 15 February 1968.
- 39th Infantry Division, inactivated 1 December 1967. Reorganized and redesignated as 39th Infantry Brigade in Arkansas.
- 40th Armored Division, inactivated 29 January 1968.
- 41st Infantry Division, inactivated 1 January 1968. Reorganized and redesignated as 41st Infantry Brigade in Oregon.
- 43rd Infantry Division, inactivated 16 December 1967.
- 44th Infantry Division, inactivated 10 October 1954.
- 45th Infantry Division, inactivated 1 February 1968. Reorganized and redesignated as 45th Infantry Brigade in Oklahoma.
- 46th Infantry Division, inactivated 1 February 1968.
- 47th Infantry Division, inactivated 10 February 1991.
- 48th Armored Division, inactivated 29 January 1968.
- 49th Armored Division, inactivated 1 May 2004; reflagged as the 36th Infantry Division.

== Units and formations ==
ARNG recruits arriving at Fort Jackson for BCT

Deployable Army units are organized as Table of organization and equipment (TOE) organizations or modified table of organization and equipment (MTOE) organizations. Non-deployable units, such as a state's joint force headquarters or regional training institutes are administered as Table of distribution and allowance (TDA) units.

=== Commands ===
- 46th Military Police Command (MI ARNG)
- 135th Sustainment Command (Expeditionary) (AL ARNG)
- 167th Sustainment Command (Theater) (AL ARNG)
- 184th Sustainment Command (Expeditionary) (MS ARNG)
- 263rd Army Air and Missile Defense Command (SC ARNG)

=== Divisions ===
In addition to many deployable units which are non-divisional, the Army National Guard's deployable units include eight infantry divisions. These divisions, their subordinate brigades or brigades with which the divisions have a training oversight relationship, and the states represented by the largest units include:

Army Aviation Magazine wrote on 31 March 2021 that "The ARNG is pressing forward with the Division Alignment for Training (DIV AFT) effort. The DIV AFT intent is to enhance leader development and training readiness through codified relationships across echelons and states to develop combat capable division formations for large scale combat operations. The Director, ARNG. recently convened a DIV AFT Initial Planning Conference to clarify unit alignments for all eight ARNG Division Headquarters and synchronize activities that will facilitate unity of effort between Division Headquarters and aligned for training States."

- 28th Infantry Division (PA ARNG)
  - 2nd Infantry Brigade Combat Team (PA ARNG)
  - 56th Mobile Brigade Combat Team (PA ARNG)
  - 256th Infantry Brigade Combat Team (LA ARNG)
  - 28th Division Artillery (PA ARNG)
  - 28th Combat Aviation Brigade (PA ARNG)
  - 28th Division Sustainment Brigade (OH ARNG)
- 29th Infantry Division (VA ARNG)
  - 48th Mobile Brigade Combat Team (GA NG)
  - 53rd Infantry Brigade Combat Team (FL ARNG)
  - 116th Mobile Brigade Combat Team (VA ARNG)
  - 29th Division Artillery (VA ARNG)
  - 29th Combat Aviation Brigade (MD ARNG)
  - 29th Division Sustainment Brigade (NC ARNG)
- 34th Infantry Division (MN ARNG)
  - 1st Armored Brigade Combat Team (MN ARNG)
  - 2nd Infantry Brigade Combat Team (IA ARNG)
  - 30th Mobile Brigade Combat Team (NC ARNG)
  - 116th Cavalry Brigade Combat Team (ID ARNG)
  - 34th Division Artillery (MN ARNG)
  - 34th Combat Aviation Brigade (MN ARNG)
  - 34th Division Sustainment Brigade (IL ARNG)
- 35th Infantry Division (KS ARNG)
  - 39th Mobile Brigade Combat Team (AR ARNG)
  - 45th Infantry Brigade Combat Team (OK ARNG)
  - 72nd Infantry Brigade Combat Team (TX ARNG)
  - 35th Division Artillery (KS ARNG)
  - 35th Combat Aviation Brigade (MO ARNG)
  - 35th Division Sustainment Brigade (TN ARNG)
- 36th Infantry Division (TX ARNG)
  - 56th Infantry Brigade Combat Team (TX ARNG)
  - 81st Mobile Brigade Combat Team (WA ARNG)
  - 155th Armored Brigade Combat Team (MS ARNG)
  - 278th Cavalry Regiment (TN ARNG)
  - 36th Division Artillery (TX ARNG)
  - 36th Combat Aviation Brigade (TX ARNG)
  - 36th Division Sustainment Brigade (TX ARNG)
- 38th Infantry Division (IN ARNG)
  - 32nd Infantry Brigade Combat Team (WI ARNG)
  - 33rd Infantry Brigade Combat Team (IL ARNG)
  - 37th Infantry Brigade Combat Team (OH ARNG)
  - 76th Mobile Brigade Combat Team (IN ARNG)
  - 38th Division Artillery (KY ARNG)
  - 38th Combat Aviation Brigade (IN ARNG)
  - 38th Division Sustainment Brigade (IN ARNG)
- 40th Infantry Division (CA ARNG)
  - 29th Infantry Brigade Combat Team (HI ARNG)
  - 41st Infantry Brigade Combat Team (OR ARNG)
  - 79th Infantry Brigade Combat Team (CA ARNG)
  - 40th Division Artillery (CA ARNG)
  - 40th Combat Aviation Brigade (CA ARNG)
  - 40th Division Sustainment Brigade (CA ARNG)
- 42nd Infantry Division (NY ARNG)
  - 27th Infantry Brigade Combat Team (NY ARNG)
  - 44th Infantry Brigade Combat Team (NJ ARNG)
  - 86th Infantry Brigade Combat Team (VT ARNG)
  - 42nd Division Artillery (NY ARNG)
  - 42nd Combat Aviation Brigade (NY ARNG)
  - 42nd Division Sustainment Brigade (NY ARNG)

=== Multifunctional Support Brigades ===
The Army National Guard fields 37 multifunctional support brigades.

==== Maneuver Enhancement Brigades ====
- 26th Maneuver Enhancement Brigade (MA ARNG) — will convert to Protection Brigade, 42nd Infantry Division
- 55th Maneuver Enhancement Brigade (PA ARNG) — will convert to Protection Brigade, 28th Infantry Division
- 67th Maneuver Enhancement Brigade (NE ARNG)
- 110th Maneuver Enhancement Brigade (MO ARNG) — will convert to Protection Brigade, 35th Infantry Division
- 130th Maneuver Enhancement Brigade (NC ARNG)
- 136th Maneuver Enhancement Brigade (TX ARNG) — will convert to Protection Brigade, 36th Infantry Division
- 141st Maneuver Enhancement Brigade (ND ARNG)
- 149th Maneuver Enhancement Brigade (KY ARNG) — will convert to Protection Brigade, 38th Infantry Division
- 157th Maneuver Enhancement Brigade (WI ARNG) — will convert to Protection Brigade, 34th Infantry Division
- 158th Maneuver Enhancement Brigade (AZ ARNG)
- 196th Maneuver Enhancement Brigade (SD ARNG)
- 204th Maneuver Enhancement Brigade (UT ARNG)
- 218th Maneuver Enhancement Brigade (SC ARNG)
- 226th Maneuver Enhancement Brigade (AL ARNG) — will convert to Protection Brigade, 29th Infantry Division
- 404th Maneuver Enhancement Brigade (IL ARNG)
- 648th Maneuver Enhancement Brigade (GA ARNG)

==== Field Artillery Brigades ====
- 45th Field Artillery Brigade (OK ARNG)
- 65th Field Artillery Brigade (UT ARNG)
- 115th Field Artillery Brigade (WY ARNG)
- 130th Field Artillery Brigade (KS ARNG)
- 138th Field Artillery Brigade (KY ARNG)
- 142nd Field Artillery Brigade (AR ARNG)
- 169th Field Artillery Brigade (CO ARNG)
- 197th Field Artillery Brigade (NH ARNG)

==== Sustainment Brigades ====
- 17th Sustainment Brigade (NV ARNG)
- 111th Sustainment Brigade (NM ARNG)

==== Military Intelligence Brigades ====
- 58th Military Intelligence Brigade (Expeditionary) (MD ARNG)
- 71st Military Intelligence Brigade (Expeditionary) (TX ARNG)
- 300th Military Intelligence Brigade (Linguist) (UT ARNG) (TDA organization)

=== Functional Support Brigades and Groups ===
==== Engineer Brigades ====
- 16th Engineer Brigade (OH ARNG)
- 35th Engineer Brigade (MO ARNG)
- 111th Engineer Brigade (WV ARNG)
- 117th Engineer Brigade (SC ARNG)
- 168th Engineer Brigade (MS ARNG)
- 176th Engineer Brigade (TX ARNG)
- 194th Engineer Brigade (TN ARNG)
- 219th Engineer Brigade (IN ARNG)
- 225th Engineer Brigade (LA ARNG)

==== Air Defense Artillery Brigades ====
- 164th Air Defense Artillery Brigade (FL ARNG)
- 174th Air Defense Artillery Brigade (OH ARNG)
- 678th Air Defense Artillery Brigade (SC ARNG)

==== Theater Tactical Signal Brigades ====
- 228th Theater Tactical Signal Brigade (SC ARNG)
- 261st Theater Tactical Signal Brigade (DE ARNG)

==== Military Police Brigades ====
- 35th Military Police Brigade (MO ARNG)
- 43rd Military Police Brigade (RI ARNG)
- 49th Military Police Brigade (CA ARNG)
- 92nd Military Police Brigade (PR ARNG)
- 142nd Military Police Brigade (AL ARNG)
- 177th Military Police Brigade (MI ARNG)

==== Theater and Combat Aviation Brigades ====
- 63rd Theater Aviation Brigade (KY ARNG)
- 77th Combat Aviation Brigade (AR ARNG)
- 185th Theater Aviation Brigade (MS ARNG)
- 449th Combat Aviation Brigade (NC ARNG)

==== Other brigades ====
- 31st Chemical Brigade (AL ARNG)
- 91st Cyber Brigade (VA ARNG) (TDA organization)
- 100th Missile Defense Brigade (CO ARNG)

==== Other Groups ====
- 19th Special Forces Group (UT ARNG)
- 20th Special Forces Group (AL ARNG)
- 111th Explosive Ordnance Group (AL ARNG)
- 56th Theater Information Operations Group (WA ARNG)
- 71st Theater Information Operations Group (TX ARNG)
- 204th Theater Aviation Operations Group (LA ARNG)
- 1100th Theater Aviation Sustainment Maintenance Group (MD ARNG)
- 1106th Theater Aviation Sustainment Maintenance Group (CA ARNG)
- 1107th Theater Aviation Sustainment Maintenance Group (MO ARNG)
- 1108th Theater Aviation Sustainment Maintenance Group (MS ARNG)
- 1109th Theater Aviation Sustainment Maintenance Group (CT ARNG)
- 42nd Regional Support Group (NJ ARNG)
- 50th Regional Support Group (FL ARNG)
- 109th Regional Support Group (SD ARNG)
- 115th Regional Support Group (CA ARNG)
- 120th Regional Support Group (ME ARNG)
- 139th Regional Support Group (LA ARNG)
- 143rd Regional Support Group (CT ARNG)
- 151st Regional Support Group (MA ARNG)
- 191st Regional Support Group (PR ARNG)
- 198th Regional Support Group (AZ ARNG)
- 201st Regional Support Group (GA ARNG)
- 213th Regional Support Group (PA ARNG)
- 272nd Regional Support Group (MI ARNG)
- 297th Regional Support Group (AK ARNG)
- 329th Regional Support Group (VA ARNG)
- 347th Regional Support Group (MN ARNG)
- 635th Regional Support Group (KS ARNG)
- 734th Regional Support Group (IA ARNG)
- 1889th Regional Support Group (MT ARNG)

=== Regular Army – Army National Guard Partnership ===
In 2016, the Army and the Army National Guard began a training and readiness initiative that aligned some Army brigades with National Guard division headquarters, and some National Guard brigades with Army division headquarters. Among others, this program included the National Guard's 86th Infantry Brigade Combat Team becoming affiliated with the Army's 10th Mountain Division and the National Guard's 1st Battalion, 143rd Infantry Regiment affiliating with the Army's 173rd Airborne Brigade Combat Team. In addition, 3rd Brigade Combat Team, 10th Mountain Division began an affiliation with the National Guard's 36th Infantry Division.

- 48th Infantry Brigade Combat Team (GA ARNG), associated with 3rd Infantry Division
- 1st Battalion (Airborne), 143rd Infantry Regiment (TX ARNG), associated with 173rd Airborne Brigade Combat Team
- 1st Battalion, 151st Infantry Regiment (IN ARNG), associated with 2nd Brigade Combat Team, 25th Infantry Division
- 840th Engineer Company (TX ARNG), associated with 36th Engineer Brigade
- 249th Transportation Company (TX ARNG), associated with 1st Cavalry Division Sustainment Brigade
- 1176th Transportation Company (TN ARNG), associated with 101st Sustainment Brigade
- 1245th Transportation Company (OK ARNG), associated with 1st Cavalry Division Sustainment Brigade
- 2123rd Transportation Company (KY ARNG), associated with 101st Sustainment Brigade

Army units partnering with Army National Guard headquarters include:

- 5th Engineer Battalion, associated with 35th Engineer Brigade (MO ARNG).

== By state ==
The Army and Air National Guard in each state are headed by the state adjutant general. The adjutant general (TAG) is the de facto commander of a state's military forces, and reports to the state governor.

State Abbr.	State
AL	Alabama
AK	Alaska
AZ	Arizona
AR	Arkansas
CA	California
CO	Colorado
CT	Connecticut
DE	Delaware
DC	District of Columbia
FL	Florida
GA	Georgia
GU	Guam
HI	Hawaii
ID	Idaho
IL	Illinois
IN	Indiana
IA	Iowa
KS	Kansas

State Abbr.	State
KY	Kentucky
LA	Louisiana
ME	Maine
MD	Maryland
MA	Massachusetts
MI	Michigan
MN	Minnesota
MS	Mississippi
MO	Missouri
MT	Montana
NE	Nebraska
NV	Nevada
NH	New Hampshire
NJ	New Jersey
NM	New Mexico
NY	New York
NC	North Carolina
ND	North Dakota

State Abbr.	State
OH	Ohio
OK	Oklahoma
OR	Oregon
PA	Pennsylvania
PR	Puerto Rico
RI	Rhode Island
SC	South Carolina
SD	South Dakota
TN	Tennessee
TX	Texas
UT	Utah
VT	Vermont
VA	Virginia
VI	U.S. Virgin Islands
WA	Washington
WV	West Virginia
WI	Wisconsin
WY	Wyoming

== Leadership ==
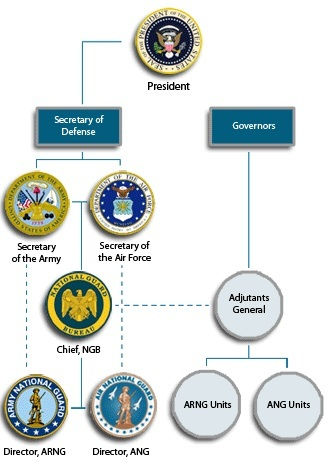
National Guard Bureau organizational chart depicting command and reporting relationships

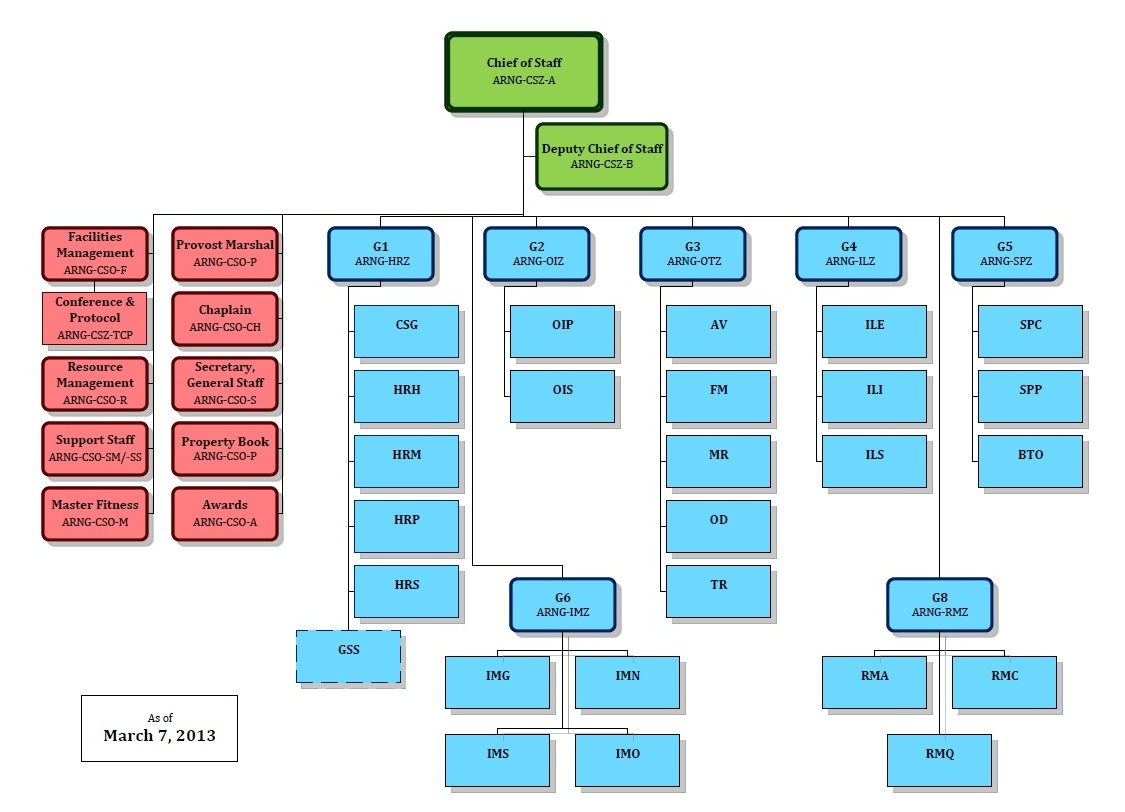
Army National Guard staff organizational chart

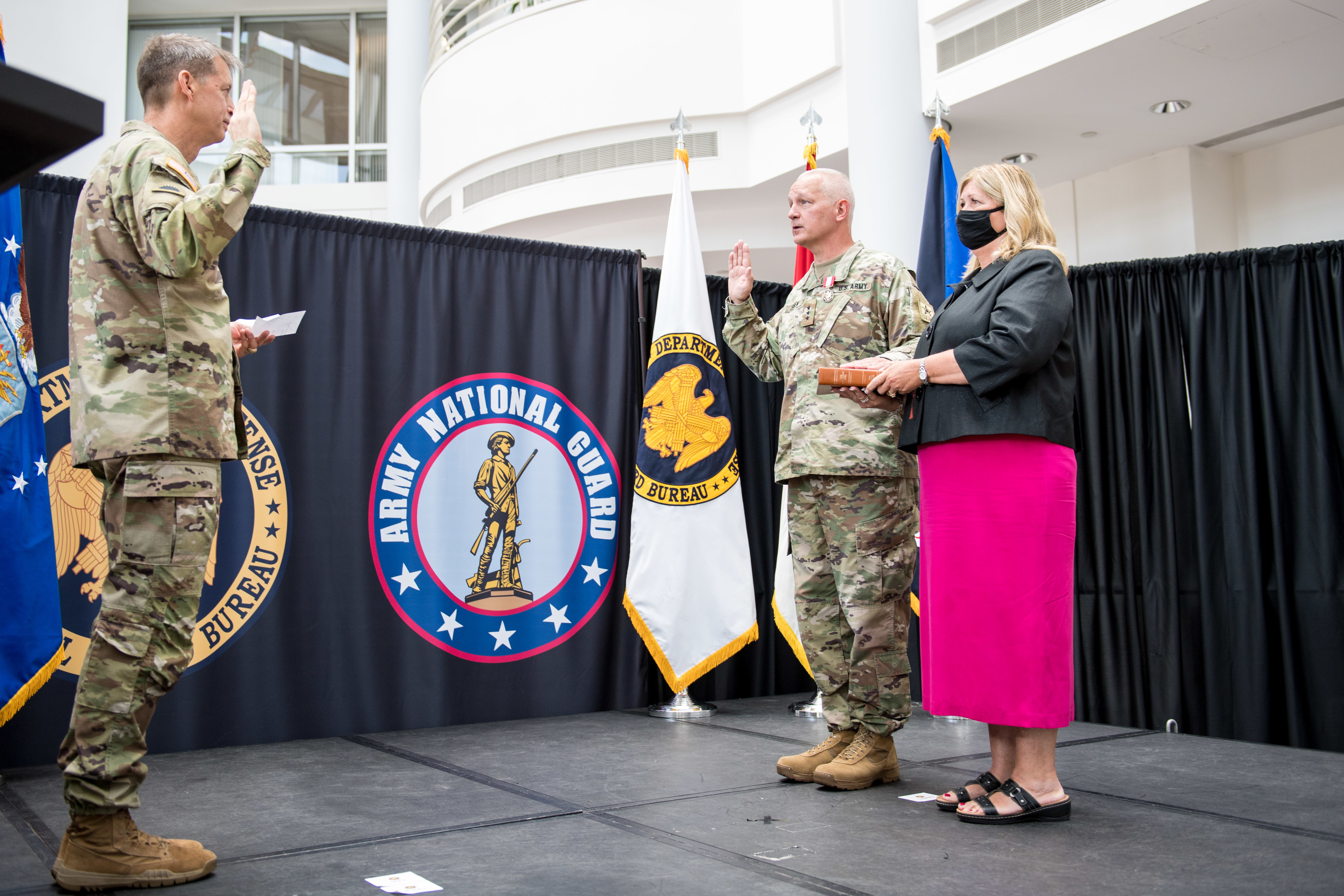
Chief of the National Guard Bureau Gen. Daniel R. Hokanson administers the oath of office to Lt. Gen. Jon A. Jensen as the 22nd director of the Army National Guard on Monday, 10 August 2020 at the Temple Army National Guard Readiness Center in Arlington, Virginia.

Upon the creation of the United States Air Force in 1947, the National Guard Bureau was organized into two divisions; Army National Guard and Air National Guard. Each were headed by a major general who reported to the chief of the National Guard Bureau. The head of the Army National Guard was originally established as the chief of the Army Division at the National Guard Bureau. The position was downgraded to brigadier general in 1962 due to force reduction. It was renamed to Director of the Army National Guard and elevated back to major general in 1970. The position was later elevated to the rank of lieutenant general in 2001. The Army National Guard is also authorized a deputy director which was originally established as a brigadier general office in 1970. It was elevated to the rank of major general in 2006.

The director of the Army National Guard oversees a staff which aids in planning and day-to-day organization and management. In addition to a chief of staff, the director's staff includes several special staff members, including a chaplain and protocol and awards specialists. It also includes a primary staff, which is organized as directorates, divisions, and branches. The directorates of the Army National Guard staff are arranged along the lines of a typical American military staff: G-1 for personnel; G-2 for intelligence; G-3 for plans, operations and training; G-4 for logistics; G-5 for strategic plans, policy and communications; G-6 for communications; and G-8 for budgets and financial management.

=== List of chiefs and directors ===
No.	Commander		Term		
No.	Portrait	Name	Took office	Left office	Term length
Chiefs of the Army Division at the National Guard Bureau
1	Raymond H. Fleming	Major General; Raymond H. Fleming	1948	1950	2 years
2	William H. Abendroth	Major General; William H. Abendroth	1951	1955	4 years
3	Donald W. McGowan	Major General; Donald W. McGowan	1955	1959	4 years
4	Clayton P. Kerr	Major General; Clayton P. Kerr	1959	1962	3 years
5	Francis Greenlief	Brigadier General; Francis Greenlief	1962	1963	1 year
6	Charles L. Southward	Brigadier General; Charles L. Southward	1964	1966	2 years
7	Leonard C. Ward	Brigadier General; Leonard C. Ward	1968	1970	2 years
Directors of the Army National Guard
8	Francis Greenlief	Major General; Francis Greenlief	1970	1971	1 year
9	La Vern E. Weber	Major General; La Vern E. Weber	1971	1974	3 years
10	Charles A. Ott Jr.	Major General; Charles A. Ott Jr.	1974	1978	4 years
11	Emmett H. Walker Jr.	Major General; Emmett H. Walker Jr.	1978	1982	4 years
12	Herbert R. Temple Jr.	Major General; Herbert R. Temple Jr.	1982	1986	4 years
13	Donald Burdick	Major General; Donald Burdick	1986	1991	5 years
14	Raymond F. Rees	Major General; Raymond F. Rees	1991	1992	1 year
15	John R. D'Araujo Jr.	Major General; John R. D'Araujo Jr.	1993	1995	2 years
16	William A. Navas Jr.	Major General; William A. Navas Jr.	October 1995	May 1998	3 years
17	Roger C. Schultz	Lieutenant General; Roger C. Schultz	1 June 1998	15 June 2004	6 years, 14 days
18	Clyde A. Vaughn	Lieutenant General; Clyde A. Vaughn	15 June 2004	9 May 2009	4 years, 328 days
−	Raymond W. Carpenter	Major General; Raymond W. Carpenter; Acting	9 May 2009	28 November 2011	2 years, 203 days
19	William E. Ingram Jr.	Lieutenant General; William E. Ingram Jr.	28 November 2011	14 January 2014	2 years, 47 days
−	Judd H. Lyons	Major General; Judd H. Lyons; Acting	14 January 2014	27 March 2015	1 year, 72 days
20	Timothy J. Kadavy	Lieutenant General; Timothy J. Kadavy	27 March 2015	25 March 2019	3 years, 363 days
21	Daniel R. Hokanson	Lieutenant General; Daniel R. Hokanson	20 June 2019	3 August 2020	1 year, 44 days
22	Jon A. Jensen	Lieutenant General; Jon A. Jensen	10 August 2020	5 August 2024	3 years, 361 days
23	Jonathan M. Stubbs	Lieutenant General; Jonathan M. Stubbs	5 August 2024	Incumbent	2 years, 92 days

== Prominent members ==
=== U.S. presidents ===
Of the 45 (Note: As of 2025. While there have been 47 presidencies, only 45 individuals have served as president. Two presidents have served non-consecutive terms: and thus, Grover Cleveland is numbered as both the 22nd and 24th U.S. president, and Donald Trump is numbered as both the 45th and 47th U.S. president.) individuals to serve as president of the United States as of 2025, 33 had military experience. Of those 33, 21 served in the militia or ARNG.

- George Washington, commissioned a major in the Virginia Militia in 1753. He attained the rank of colonel before resigning his commission at the end of the French and Indian War.
- Thomas Jefferson, colonel and commander of the Albemarle County Militia at the start of the American Revolution
- James Madison, colonel in the Orange County Militia at the start of the American Revolution and aide to his father, James Madison, Sr., who was the commander.
- James Monroe, served in the militia while attending the College of William and Mary. After being wounded at the Battle of Trenton while serving in the Continental Army, he returned to Virginia to recruit and lead a regiment as a militia lieutenant colonel, but the regiment was never raised. In 1780 the British invaded Richmond, Virginia, and Jefferson commissioned Monroe as a colonel to command the militia raised in response and act as liaison to the Continental Army in North Carolina.
- Andrew Jackson, commander of the Tennessee Militia as a major general prior to the War of 1812.
- William Henry Harrison, commander of Indiana Territory's militia and Major General of the Kentucky Militia at the start of the War of 1812.
- John Tyler, commanded a company called the Charles City Rifles, part of Virginia's 52nd Regiment, in the War of 1812.
- James Polk, joined the Tennessee Militia as a captain in a cavalry regiment in 1821. He was subsequently appointed a colonel on the staff of Governor William Carroll.
- Millard Fillmore, served as inspector of New York's 47th Brigade with the rank of major. Commanded the Union Continentals, a militia unit raised to perform local service in Buffalo, New York, during the American Civil War.
- Franklin Pierce, appointed aide de camp to Governor Samuel Dinsmoor in 1831. He remained in the militia until 1847 and attained the rank of colonel before becoming a brigadier general in the Army during the Mexican–American War.
- James Buchanan, a member of the Pennsylvania Militia. His dragoon unit took part in the defense of Baltimore, Maryland, during the War of 1812.
- Abraham Lincoln, served in the Illinois Militia during the Black Hawk War. He commanded a company in the 4th Illinois Regiment with the rank of captain from April to May 1832. He was a private in Captain Alexander White's Company from May to June 1832. He served as a private in Captain Jacob Earley's company from June to July 1832.
- Andrew Johnson, served in the Tennessee Militia in the 1830s, and attained the rank of colonel. During the American Civil War he remained loyal to the Union and was appointed Military Governor of Tennessee with the rank of brigadier general.
- Ulysses S. Grant, having left the Army as a captain, at the start of the Civil War he served in the Illinois Militia as aide de camp and mustering officer for Governor Richard Yates. He held these positions until being appointed commander of the 21st Illinois Infantry, which set him on the path to becoming a general and commander of all Union armies.
- Rutherford B. Hayes, joined a militia company in 1846 intending to fight in the Mexican–American War, but resigned because of ill health. Enlisted as a private in a Cincinnati militia company at the start of the Civil War in 1861, and was elected commander with the rank of captain. He was subsequently appointed a major in the 23rd Ohio Infantry, and ended the war as a brigade commander and brevet Major General.
- James A. Garfield, commissioned a lieutenant colonel in the Ohio Militia in 1861, he took part in recruiting and training the 42nd Ohio Infantry Regiment, which he commanded as a colonel. He later served as Chief of Staff for the Army of the Cumberland and received promotion to Major General.
- Chester A. Arthur, became a member of the New York Militia soon after becoming a lawyer. During the Civil War he served on the staff of Governor Edwin D. Morgan as Quartermaster General with the rank of brigadier general. He later served as Morgan's inspector general, responsible for visiting New York's front line units, assessing conditions and recommending improvements.
- Benjamin Harrison, commissioned in the Indiana Militia by Governor Oliver P. Morton to recruit a regiment during the Civil War, he was subsequently appointed a second lieutenant and captain in and then colonel and commander of the 70th Indiana Infantry Regiment. He received the brevet of brigadier general as a commendation of his service, and later commanded a brigade. He also enrolled in the militia again during labor unrest in Indianapolis in 1877.
- William McKinley, joined a volunteer militia company called the Poland Guards at the start of the Civil War. The company was subsequently mustered in as part of the 23rd Ohio Infantry, the same regiment in which President Hayes served. McKinley ended the war as a major and chief of staff for division commander Samuel S. Carroll.
- Theodore Roosevelt, commissioned as a second lieutenant in the 8th New York Infantry Regiment in 1884, he served until 1888 and attained the rank of captain. During the Spanish–American War he was commissioned lieutenant colonel of the 1st United States Volunteer Cavalry, which he later commanded as a colonel. In 2001 a review of his war record led to a posthumous award of the Medal of Honor.
- Harry S. Truman, served in the Missouri Army National Guard from 1905 to 1911, rising to the rank of corporal. During World War I he rejoined and was commissioned a first lieutenant in the 2nd Missouri Field Artillery. This regiment was federalized as the 129th Field Artillery, and Truman commanded Battery D as a captain. He continued to serve in the Army Reserve, retiring as a colonel in 1953.

(Note: President George W. Bush served in the National Guard in the late 1960s and early 1970s, and he was the first Air National Guard member to attain the presidency.)

== See also ==
- United States Army National Guard Regional Training Institutes
- Space National Guard
- Command Sergeant Major of the Army National Guard
- Command Chief Warrant Officer of the Army National Guard

== Sources ==
- Wilson, John B. (1998). Maneuver and Firepower, the Evolution of Divisions and Separate Brigades. Army Lineage Series (CMH Pub 60-14). Washington, D. C.: Center of Military History, United States Army.
