= 34th Division Sustainment Brigade =

- 34th Division Sustainment Brigade shoulder sleeve insignia
- Active: 2007–present
- Country: United States
- Branch: Illinois Army National Guard
- Type: Sustainment Brigade
- Garrison/HQ: Chicago, IL

Insignia
- 108th Sustainment Brigade former SSI

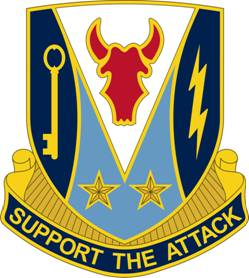
- 34th Division Sustainment Brigade DUI

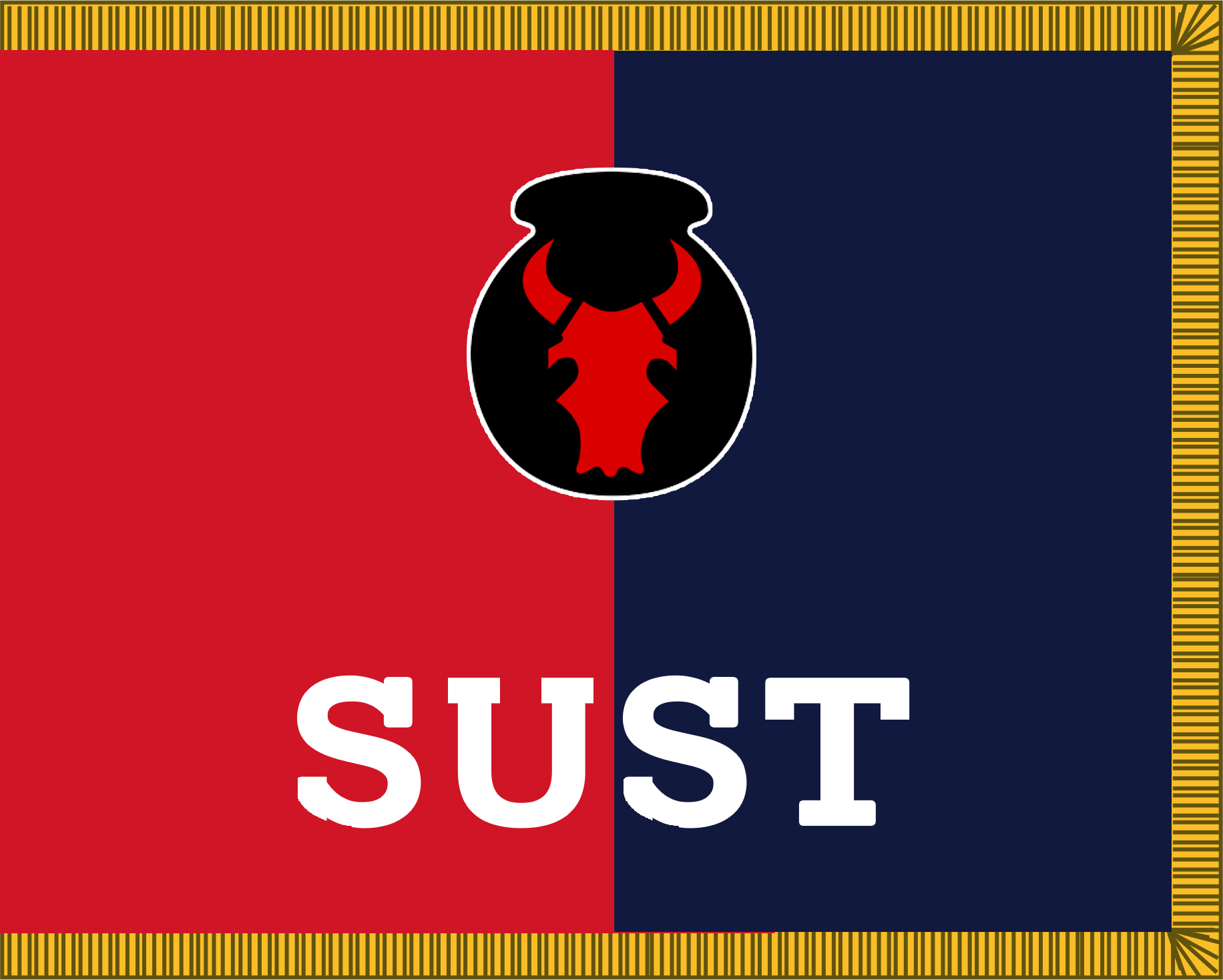
- 34th Division Sustainment Brigade Flag

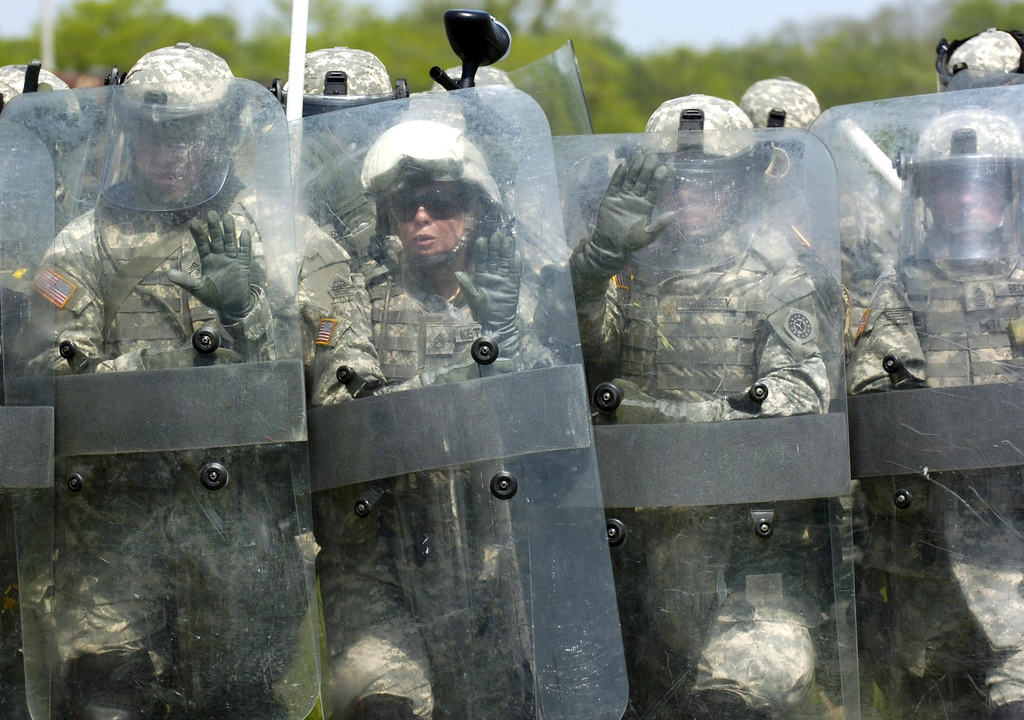
1144th Transportation Battalion soldiers conduct training in riot gear

The 34th Division Sustainment Brigade (former 108th Sustainment Brigade) is a sustainment brigade of the United States Army National Guard in Illinois, which is assigned to the 34th Infantry Division.

The 33rd Area Support Group transformed into the 108th Sustainment Brigade. With more than 1,700 Soldiers, the Chicago-based brigade is made of Medical, Personnel support, and Transportation support units.

The distinctive unit insignia was originally approved for the 108th Quartermaster Regiment, Illinois National Guard on 19 May 1939. It was rescinded on 10 January 1943. It was reinstated and redesignated for the 108th Supply and Transport Battalion, Illinois Army National Guard on 10 December 1964. The insignia was redesignated for the 108th Support Battalion, Illinois Army National Guard on 26 November 1968. It was redesignated for the 108th Maintenance Battalion, Illinois Army National Guard on 23 December 1997. The insignia was redesignated for the 108th Sustainment Brigade on 13 October 2006.

The Brigade’s current mission is to provide sustainment operations for the 34th Red Bull Infantry Division, Minnesota Army National Guard. This partnership between units in Illinois and Minnesota is part of the Army National Guard effort to align division headquarters with down-trace formations for training.

== History ==
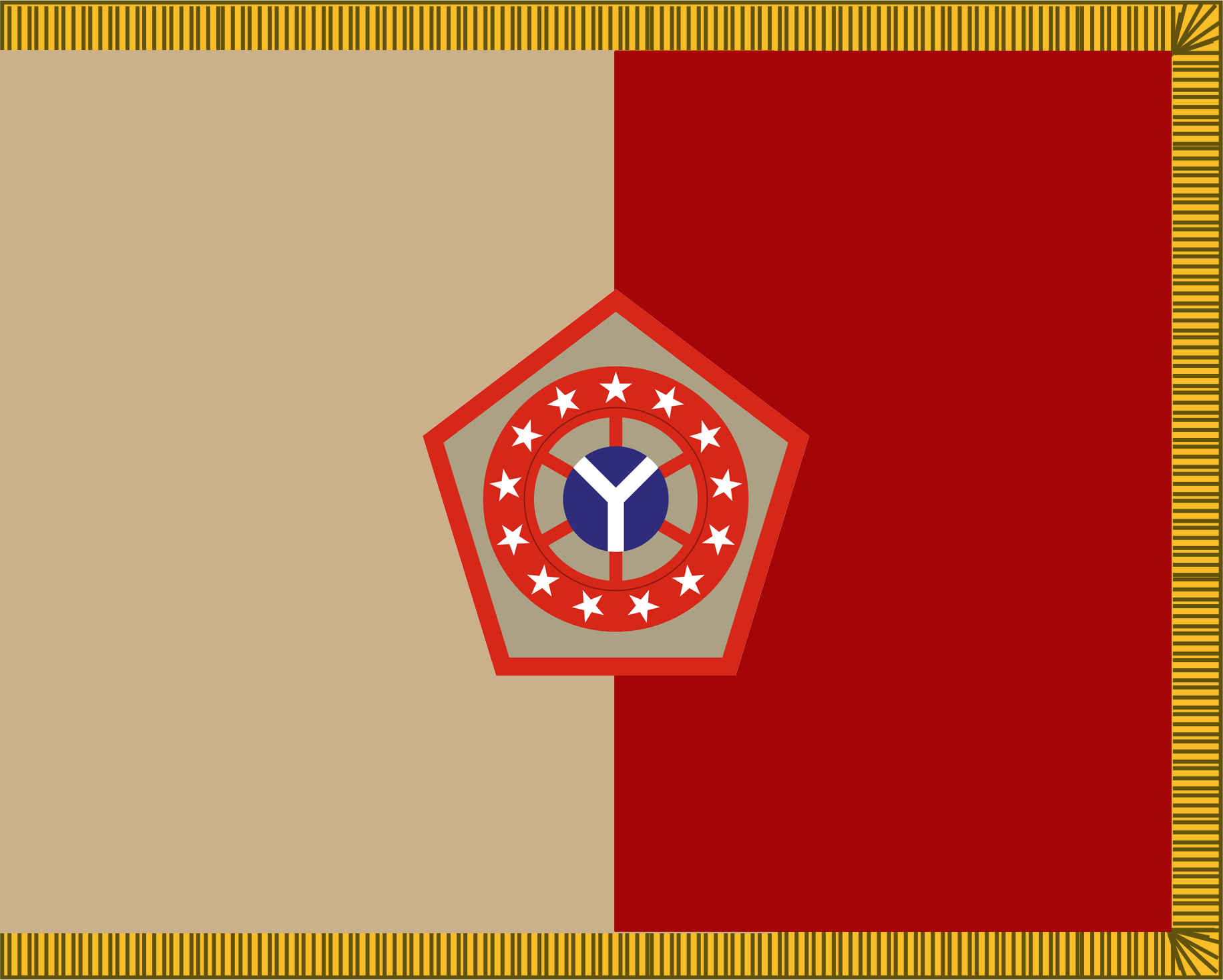
108th Sustainment Brigade Flag

Defining itself as "Chicago's Brigade", the 108th Sustainment Brigade has developed into a force tasked with executing both state-directed and federal missions. The brigade headquarters deployed to Iraq after mobilizing in mid-July 2019, where it provided logistics training to the Iraqi Army at Camp Taji. The brigade returned to the United States in May 2020.

== Organization ==
As of February 2026 the 34th Division Sustainment Brigade consists of the following units:

- 34th Division Sustainment Brigade, in Chicago (IL)
  - 34th Division Sustainment Troops Battalion, in Chicago (IL)
    - Headquarters and Headquarters Company, 34th Division Sustainment Brigade, in Chicago (IL)
    - 433rd Signal Company, in Chicago (IL)
    - 633rd Adjutant General Detachment (Theater Gateway — Personnel Accountability Team), in Chicago (IL)
    - 1863rd Financial Management Support Detachment, in Chicago (IL)
  - 6th Battalion (Brigade Support), 54th Security Force Assistance Brigade, at Rock Island Arsenal (IL)
    - Headquarters Support Company, 6th Battalion (Brigade Support), 54th Security Force Assistance Brigade, at Rock Island Arsenal (IL)
    - Company A, 6th Battalion (Brigade Support), 54th Security Force Assistance Brigade, at Rock Island Arsenal (IL)
    - Company B, 6th Battalion (Brigade Support), 54th Security Force Assistance Brigade, at Rock Island Arsenal (IL)
  - 108th Medical Battalion (Multifunctional), in North Riverside (IL)
    - Headquarters and Headquarters Detachment, 108th Medical Battalion (Multifunctional), in North Riverside (IL)
    - 708th Medical Company (Ground Ambulance), in North Riverside (IL)
    - 709th Medical Company (Area Support), in Bartonville (IL)
    - 710th Medical Company (Area Support), in Crestwood (IL)
  - 198th Combat Sustainment Support Battalion, in North Riverside (IL)
    - Headquarters and Headquarters Company, 198th Combat Sustainment Support Battalion, in North Riverside (IL)
    - 725th Transportation Company (Medium Truck) (POL, 5K GAL), in Machesney Park (IL)
    - 1244th Transportation Company (Medium Truck) (Cargo), in North Riverside (IL)
    - 1644th Transportation Company (Medium Truck) (Cargo), in Rock Falls (IL)
    - 1744th Transportation Company (Medium Truck) (Cargo), in Crestwood (IL)
  - 232nd Combat Sustainment Support Battalion, in Springfield (IL)
    - Headquarters and Headquarters Company, 232nd Combat Sustainment Support Battalion, in Springfield (IL)
    - 126th Quartermaster Company (Field Service), in Quincy (IL)
    - 128th Quartermaster Platoon (Field Feeding), in North Riverside (IL)
      - Detachment 1, 128th Quartermaster Platoon (Field Feeding), in Crestwood (IL)
      - Detachment 2, 128th Quartermaster Platoon (Field Feeding), in Rock Falls (IL)
    - 733rd Quartermaster Platoon (Field Feeding), in Springfield (IL)
      - Detachment 1, 733rd Quartermaster Platoon (Field Feeding), in Bartonville (IL)
      - Detachment 2, 733rd Quartermaster Platoon (Field Feeding), in East St. Louis (IL)
      - Detachment 3, 733rd Quartermaster Platoon (Field Feeding), in Paris (IL)
    - 1544th Transportation Company (Light-Medium Truck), in Paris (IL)
      - Detachment 1, 1544th Transportation Company (Light-Medium Truck), in Danville (IL)
    - 1844th Transportation Company (Light-Medium Truck), in East St. Louis (IL)
    - 1970th Quartermaster Company (Water Purification and Distribution), in North Riverside (IL)
    - 3625th Ordnance Company (Classification and Inspection Company), in North Riverside (IL)
    - 3637th Ordnance Company (Support Maintenance), in Springfield (IL)
  - 1347th Division Sustainment Support Battalion, in Bloomington (MN) (Minnesota Army National Guard)
    - Headquarters and Headquarters Company, 1347th Division Sustainment Support Battalion, in Bloomington (MN)
    - Company A (Composite Supply Company), 1347th Division Sustainment Support Battalion, in Fairfield (IA)
      - Detachment 1, Company A, 1347th Division Sustainment Support Battalion, in Dubuque (IA)
      - Detachment 2, Company A, 1347th Division Sustainment Support Battalion, in Clinton (IA)
    - Company B (Support Maintenance Company), 1347th Division Sustainment Support Battalion, in Knoxville (IA)
      - Detachment 1, Company B, 1347th Division Sustainment Support Battalion, in Oskaloosa (IA)
    - Company C (Composite Truck Company), 1347th Division Sustainment Support Battalion, in Duluth (MN)
      - Detachment 1, Company C, 1347th Division Sustainment Support Battalion, in Chisholm (MN)
