= 113th Sustainment Brigade =

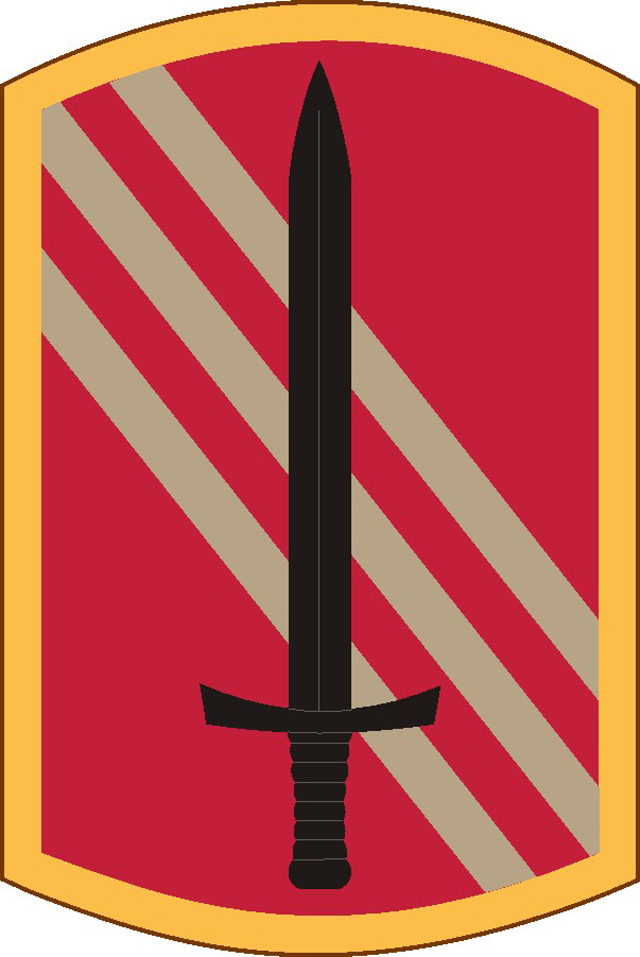
- 113th Sustainment Brigade shoulder sleeve insignia
- Active: 1974–2008 (113 Field Artillery Brigade); 2008-present (113 Sustainment Brigade)
- Country: United States
- Allegiance: North Carolina Army National Guard
- Branch: United States Army National Guard
- Type: Sustainment Brigade
- Role: Combat Service and Support
- Size: 1784
- Part of: 29th Infantry Division (United States)
- Garrison/HQ: Greensboro, North Carolina (Headquarters)
- Nickname: Steel Horses
- Motto: One team. Twice as strong.
- Website: 113th Sustainment Brigade

Commanders
- Current commander: COL Zaire D. Mcrae
- Notable commanders: COL Robert S. Wright, 2016–18 COL Bernard E. Williford Jr., 2014–16; COL David L. Jones, 2011–14; COL Elizabeth D. Austin, 2008–10 COL James R. Gorham, 2007–08

Insignia
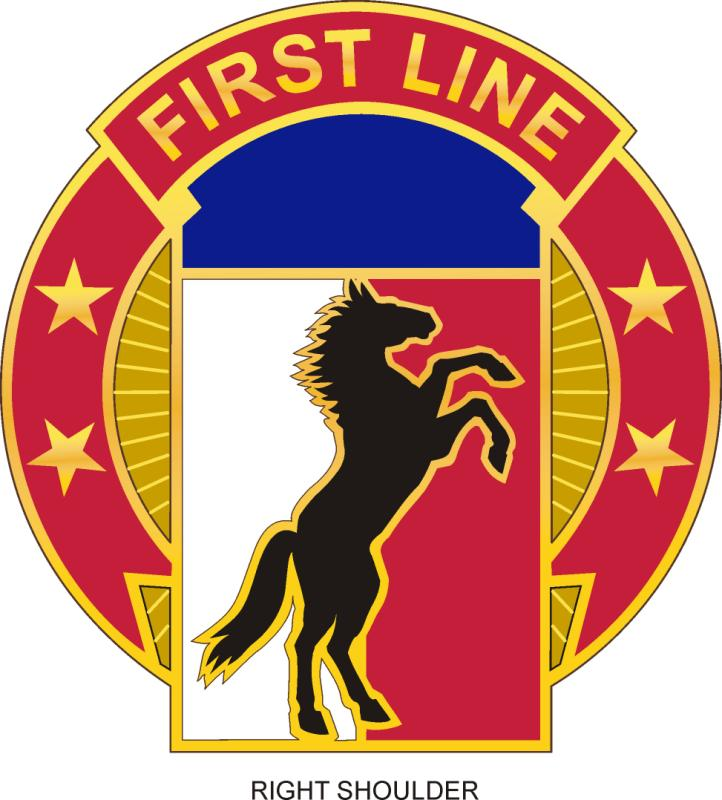
- Distinctive unit insignia

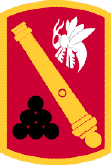
- 113th Field Artillery SSI

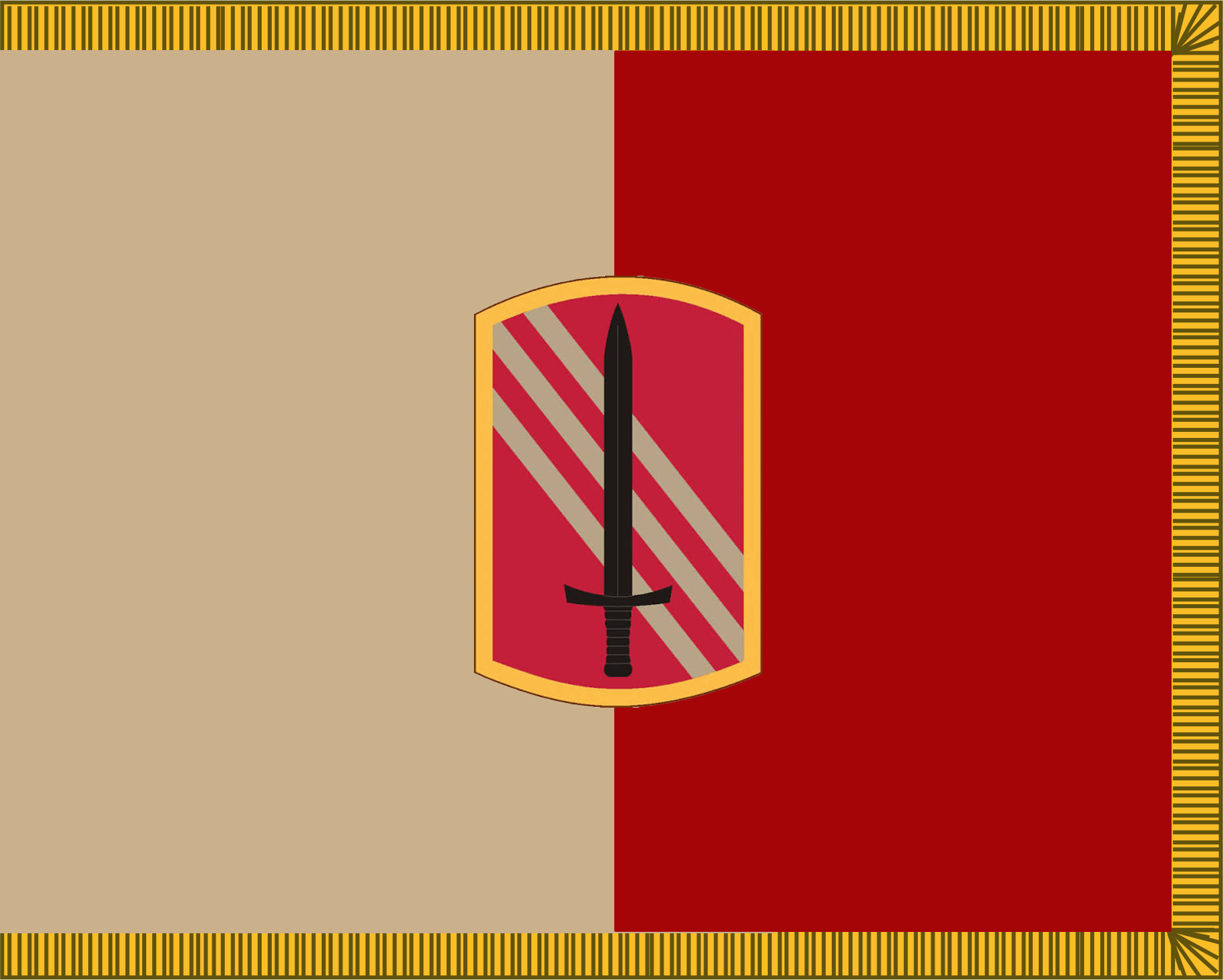
- 113th Sustainment Brigade Flag

The 113th Sustainment Brigade is a modular sustainment brigade of the United States Army National Guard.

The unit is composed of units from the North Carolina Army National Guard. The unit was originally formed in 1974 as the 113th Field Artillery Brigade. On 5 October 2008, the unit was reformed as a sustainment brigade, losing the 5th Battalion, 113th Field Artillery Regiment, a unit that had been assigned to the brigade since its formation, as a part of the process. The unit honors and lineage has since passed onto Battery C, 5th Battalion, 113th Field Artillery Regiment. To date, the 113th Sustainment Brigade has been a key contributor to mobilizing units within the NCNG in support of Operation Enduring Freedom, Operation Iraqi Freedom and the Multinational Force and Observers by providing personnel, transportation and equipment support.

== Insignia ==
=== Shoulder Sleeve Insignia ===
Description: The new shoulder sleeve insignia is a scarlet rectangle arched at the top and bottom, three inches in height and two inches in width. There are three buff bendlets, superimposed by a black sword pointing up, all within a one-eight-inch yellow border.

Symbolism: The three bendlets represent Ordnance, Quartermaster, & Transportation; the three branches that form the Logistics branch, which is the parent branch of the Sustainment Brigade. The sword represents the Warrior Ethos. Buff (gold) and red are the colors traditionally used for Sustainment and Support. This patch will be worn on the Class-A uniform, and a subdued version will be worn on the Army Combat Uniform.

Background: The shoulder sleeve insignia was effective 1 July 2010.

=== Distinctive unit insignia ===
Description: The distinctive unit insignia will be a gold-color metal and enamel device one and one-eight inches in height. The device will have a rectilinear shield blazoned. In the middle of the shield, there is a silver (white) half and a red half behind a black horse rampant. A blue block is above the horse. Around the blue block is a red tripartite scroll, with "FIRST LINE" inscribed on the top section. On the side sections, there are two gold stars on either side.

Symbolism: The blue, white and red colors of the shield are in reference to the state flag of North Carolina. The colors also symbolize loyalty, purity of purpose, and valor. Scarlet and gold are the colors used by Sustainment units. The four stars represent Ordnance, Quartermaster, Transportation and the Warrior Ethos. The rearing horse, in its combatant stance, captures the fighting spirit of the Brigade. The radiating lines in the background signify that all roads lead to logistics. Gold is emblematic of excellence and high ideals.

Background: The insignia was effective 1 July 2010.

== Current Organization ==
- Headquarters, 113th Sustainment Brigade
  - Headquarters and Headquarters Company (HHC), 113th Sustainment Brigade
- Headquarters, 113th Special Troops Battalion
  - 196th Signal Company
  - 130th Financial Management Support Unit
  - 112th Finance Detachment
  - 113th Finance Detachment
  - 1452d Transportation Company (-)
    - Detachment 1, 1452d Transportation Company
  - 694th Maintenance Company (-)
    - Detachment 1, 694th Maintenance Company
  - 540th Judge Advocate General Detachment
  - 325th Judge Advocate General Detachment
- Headquarters, 630th Combat Sustainment Support Battalion
  - Headquarters and Headquarters Company (HHC), 630th Combat Sustainment Support Battalion
  - 1450th Transportation Company
  - 1451st Transportation Company (-)
    - Detachment 1, 1451st Transportation Company
    - Detachment 2, 1451st Transportation Company
  - 1454th Transportation Company
  - 626th Maintenance Company (-)
    - Detachment 1, 626th Maintenance Company

== Current Command Structure ==
113th Sustainment Brigade Commander
COL Zaire D. McRae

113th Sustainment Brigade Command Sergeant Major
CSM William M. Bullins

113th Special Troops Battalion Commander
LTC Charles B. Larew

113th Special Troops Battalion Command Sergeant Major
CSM Richard S. Huff

630th Combat Sustainment Support Battalion Commander
LTC Kelby T. Glass

630th Combat Sustainment Support Battalion Command Sergeant Major
CSM Todd Lingerfelt
