= Sustainment Brigades in the United States Army =

Task-based flexible support units

Sustainment Brigades were created as part of the early 21st century transformation of the United States Army from a division-based structure to a brigade-based army.

== Mission ==
The sustainment brigade is a flexible headquarters that is task organized to support unified land operations and command subordinate sustainment organizations. It is task organized with a combination of combat sustainment support battalions and functional logistics battalions It is a multifunctional headquarters that integrates and employs sustainment units while planning and synchronizing sustainment operations. The sustainment brigade supports Army forces at the tactical and operational levels, providing support to brigade combat teams (BCTs), multifunctional and functional support brigades, deployable, self-contained division and corps headquarters, and other units operating in its assigned support area. The brigade is primarily concerned with the continuous management and distribution of stocks, human resources support, execution of financial management support, and allocation of maintenance in the AO to provide operational reach to maneuver commanders.

=== Variants ===
There are two Sustainment Brigade variants: Division Sustainment Brigades (DSB) and Echelon-Above-Division (EAD) Sustainment Brigades.

- Division Sustainment Brigade provides baseline sustainment units, planning, and synchronization within the Division support area. It consistent of standardized Division Sustainment Support Battalion, Division Sustainment Special Troops Battalion, and may be augmented by modular Combat Sustainment Support Battalions depending upon the mission.
- Echelon-Above-Division Sustainment Brigades are modular in nature assigned to an Expeditionary Sustainment Command (ESC) and task organized to operate in the Corps and/or Theater areas.

== Echelon Above Division (EAD) Sustainment Brigades ==
Unit	Patch	Component	Headquarters
16th Sustainment Brigade		Active Duty	Baumholder, Germany
17th Sustainment Brigade		Nevada Army National Guard	Las Vegas, Nevada
55th Sustainment Brigade		Reserve	Fort Belvoir, Virginia
77th Sustainment Brigade		Reserve	Fort Dix, New Jersey
89th Sustainment Brigade		Reserve	Wichita, Kansas
90th Sustainment Brigade		Reserve	North Little Rock, Arkansas
96th Sustainment Brigade		Reserve	Salt Lake City, Utah
111th Sustainment Brigade		New Mexico Army National Guard	Rio Rancho, New Mexico
300th Sustainment Brigade		Reserve	Grand Prairie, Texas
304th Sustainment Brigade		Reserve	March Air Force Base, California
321st Sustainment Brigade		Reserve	Baton Rouge, Louisiana
518th Sustainment Brigade		Reserve	Raleigh, North Carolina
528th Sustainment Brigade (Special Operations) (Airborne)		Active Duty	Fort Bragg, North Carolina

== Divisional Sustainment Brigades ==
Shoulder Sleeve Insignia	Unit	Component	Headquarters	Former unit name	Former shoulder sleeve insignia
	1st Cavalry Division Sustainment Brigade	Active Duty	Fort Cavazos, Texas	4th Sustainment Brigade	
	1st Armored Division Sustainment Brigade	Active Duty	Fort Bliss, Texas	15th Sustainment Brigade	
	1st Infantry Division Sustainment Brigade	Active Duty	Fort Riley, Kansas	1st Sustainment Brigade	
	2nd Infantry Division Sustainment Brigade	Active Duty	Camp Humphreys, South Korea	501st Sustainment Brigade	
	3rd Infantry Division Sustainment Brigade	Active Duty	Fort Stewart, Georgia	3rd Sustainment Brigade	
	4th Infantry Division Sustainment Brigade	Active Duty	Fort Carson, Colorado	43rd Sustainment Brigade	
	10th Mountain Division Sustainment Brigade	Active Duty	Fort Drum, New York	10th Sustainment Brigade	
	25th Infantry Division Sustainment Brigade	Active Duty	Schofield Barracks, Hawaii	45th Sustainment Brigade	
	28th Infantry Division Sustainment Brigade	Ohio Army National Guard	Springfield, Ohio	371st Sustainment Brigade	
	29th Infantry Division Sustainment Brigade	North Carolina Army National Guard	Greensboro, North Carolina	113th Sustainment Brigade	
	34th Infantry Division Sustainment Brigade	Illinois Army National Guard	Chicago, Illinois	108th Sustainment Brigade	
	35th Infantry Division Sustainment Brigade	Tennessee Army National Guard	Chattanooga, Tennessee	230th Sustainment Brigade	
	36th Infantry Division Sustainment Brigade	Texas Army National Guard	Dallas, Texas	36th Sustainment Brigade	
	38th Infantry Division Sustainment Brigade	Indiana Army National Guard	Kokomo, Indiana	38th Sustainment Brigade	
	40th Infantry Division Sustainment Brigade	California Army National Guard	Long Beach, California	224th Sustainment Brigade	
	42nd Infantry Division Sustainment Brigade	New York Army National Guard	New York, New York	369th Sustainment Brigade	
	82nd Airborne Division Sustainment Brigade	Active Duty	Fort Bragg, North Carolina	82nd Sustainment Brigade	
	101st Airborne Division Sustainment Brigade	Active Duty	Fort Campbell, Kentucky	101st Sustainment Brigade	

== See also ==
- Reorganization plan of United States Army
- Coats of arms of U.S. Support Battalions
