= 1st Cavalry Division Sustainment Brigade =

Basic logistics formation of the 1st Cavalry Division, US Army

Sustainment Brigade, 1st Cavalry Division
- Active: 1984-present
- Country: United States
- Allegiance: United States Army
- Type: Division Sustainment Brigade
- Role: Logistics
- Size: Brigade
- Part of: 1st Cavalry Division
- Garrison/HQ: Fort Hood
- Nickname: "Wagonmasters"
- Motto: Wagonmaster Proud
- Website: https://1cda.org/history/history-1sb/

Commanders
- Commander: COL Octavia L. Davis
- Command Sergeant Major: CSM Jeri Pihlaja

Insignia
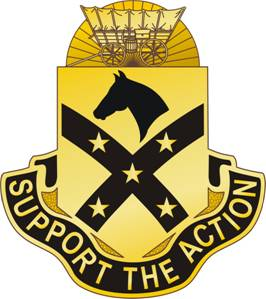
- Distinctive Unit Insignia

The Sustainment Brigade, 1st Cavalry Division is a divisional logistics and combat support brigade of the United States Army. It was constituted on 22 August 1957 in the Regular Army as Headquarters and Headquarters Detachment, 1st Cavalry Division Trains and activated on 1 November 1957 in Korea. On 1 September 1963 it was consolidated with the 1st Cavalry Division Band (organized in 1856) and the consolidated unit was reorganized and redesignated as Headquarters, Headquarters Company and Band, 1st Cavalry Division Support Command. It was reorganized and redesignated on 5 May 1971 as Headquarters and Headquarters Company, 1st Cavalry Division Support Command (Band concurrently withdrawn from the 1st Cavalry Division Support Command), and finally redesignated as the Sustainment Brigade, 1st Cavalry Division on 25 June 2015.
