= 28th Division Sustainment Brigade =

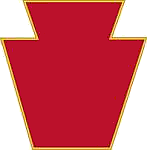
- Brigade Shoulder Sleeve Insignia
- Active: 29 August 1917 – present
- Country: United States
- Allegiance: Ohio
- Branch: United States Army
- Role: Sustainment
- Size: Brigade
- Part of: United States Army National Guard
- Garrison/HQ: Springfield, Ohio
- Nickname: Sustainment Warriors
- Motto: "Sustain the Fight!"
- Streamers: Lorraine; 1918 Northern Solomons; 22 Feb 1943 – 21 Nov 1944 Luzon w/ Arrowhead; 15 Dec 1944 – 4 Jul 1945 Philippine Presidential Unit Citation; 17 Oct 1944 – 4 Jul 1945 Iraq; 2003 – 2004 Iraq Surge; 10 Jan 2007 – 31 Dec 2008 Iraq Sovereignty; 1 Jan 2009 – 31 Aug 2010 Central Asia; 2013 – 2014 Central Asia 2017 – 2018

Commanders
- Current commander: COL Michael H. Burgett

Insignia
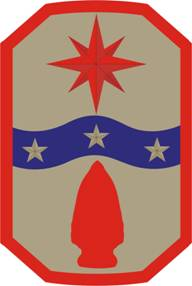
- Former SSI of 371st Sustainment Brigade

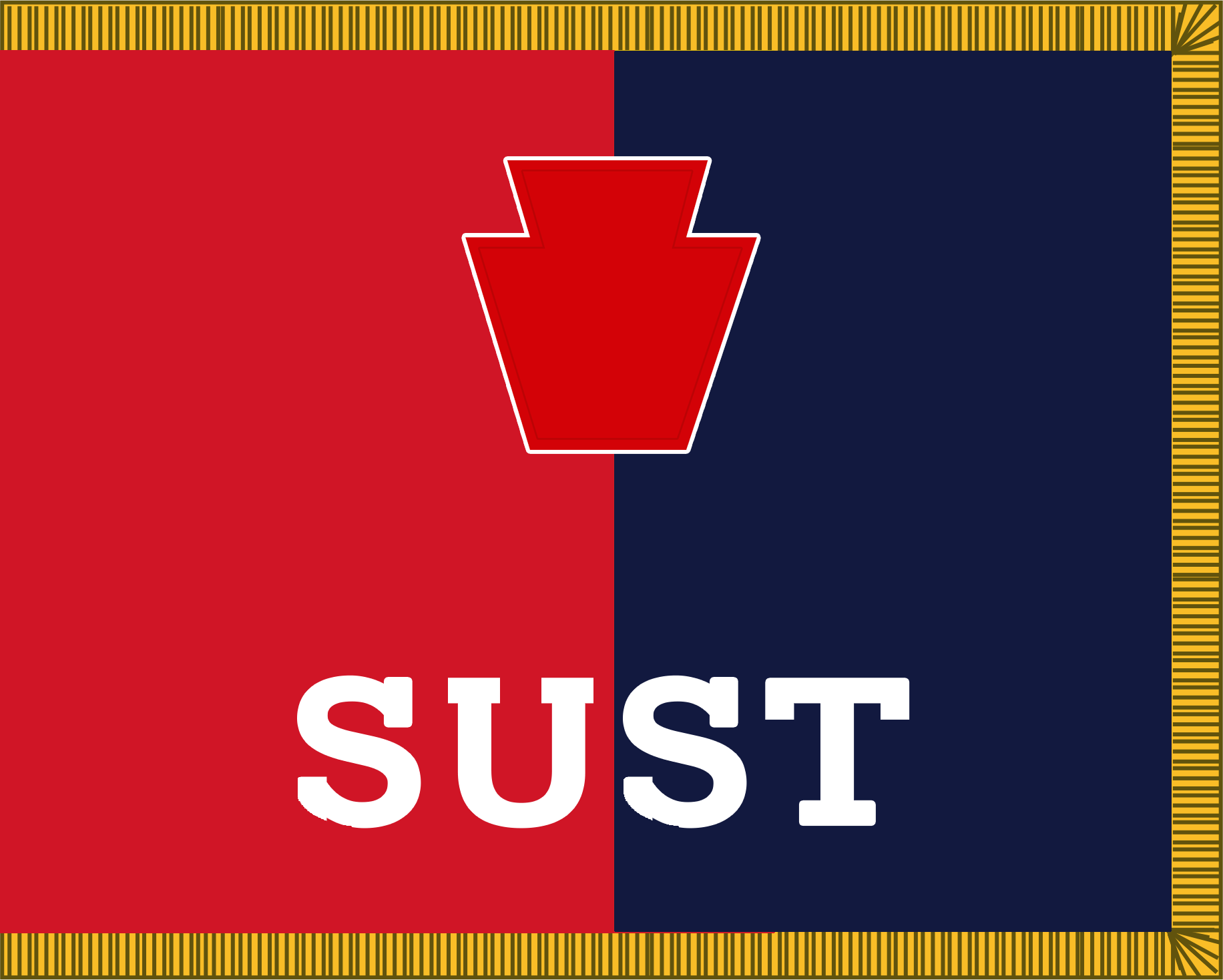
- 28th Division Sustainment Brigade Flag

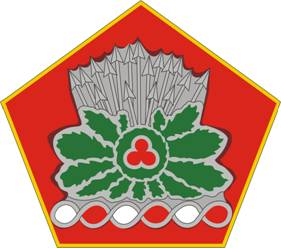
- DUI of 371st Sustainment Brigade

The 28th Division Sustainment Brigade is an Ohio Army National Guard unit of the 28th Infantry Division. The 28th Division is centred in Pennsylvania. The brigade is based at the Springfield–Beckley Municipal Airport in Springfield, Ohio. The Brigade includes the 28th Division Sustainment Troops Battalion in Newark, Ohio, the 112th Transportation Battalion, in North Canton, Ohio, and the 728th Division Sustainment Support Battalion in Fort Indiantown Gap, Pennsylvania. Until July 2025, the brigade was known as 371st Sustainment Brigade.

== Creation ==
The 371st Sustainment Brigade's parent unit was created 29 August 1917 as the 62d Field Artillery Brigade, an element of the 37th Division at Camp Sheridan, Alabama. The 62d Field Artillery Brigade included the 134th Field Artillery Regiment, 135th Field Artillery Regiment, 136th Field Artillery Regiment, and the 112th Trench Mortar Battery. Members of the 1st Field Artillery, 2d Field Artillery, and 3d Field Artillery of the Ohio Militia filled the ranks of the brigade. After initial training, the brigade traveled to France.

== World War I ==
=== Commanders ===
BG William R. Smith 29 Aug 17 – 22 Aug 18
BG Edward Burr 23 Aug 18 – End of War

=== Training ===
By 19 July 1918, the Brigade was detached from the 37th Division and bivouacked at Camp de Souge, France. At Camp de Souge, the French Army trained the Brigade on current tactics before beginning combat operations.

=== Combat operations ===
The Brigade supported the 28th Division, 33d Division, 92d Division, Second Army, and IX Corps in combat operations as follows:

- 28th Division
  - 134th FA RGT Pannes Sector, 28 Oct – 11 Nov 1918.
- 33d Division
  - 62d FA BDE and 135th FA RGT Troyon Sector, 28 Oct 28 – 11 Nov 1918.
- 92d Division
  - 62d FA BDE Revigny Area and Marbache Sector, 26 Sep – 23 Oct 1918.
  - 136th FA RGT Marbache Sector, 24–30 Oct 1918.
- Second Army
  - 62d FA BDE Thillombois Area, 18–25 Nov 1918.
- IX Corps
  - 62d FA BDE Thillombois Area, 26 Nov 1918 – 27 Jan 1919.

== Interwar period ==
After World War I the Brigade returned to Ohio. By 1922, the Brigade was reorganized into two components: Headquarters, 62d Field Artillery Brigade (today known as the 16th Engineer Brigade) at Cleveland, Ohio and Headquarters Battery, 62d Field Artillery Brigade (today known as the 371st Sustainment Brigade) at Dayton, Ohio. The Brigade converted from horse drawn to motor drawn in October 1934.

The brigade spent the interwar years training as a division level force instead of regimental units.

== World War II ==
After the beginning of World War II, the headquarters battery was inducted into federal service on 15 October 1940. It was dispatched to Camp Shelby, Mississippi for training with the 37th Infantry Division. On 1 February 1942 it was reorganized as the 37th Division Artillery (DIVARTY) and served in the Pacific Theater under the 37th Infantry Division. The 37th DIVARTY, commanded by BG Leo M. Kreber, was mobilized through 18 December 1945 in support of World War II where it earned the Philippine Presidential Unit Citation. During World War II, the 37th DIVARTY was made up of the 134th Field Artillery Regiment, 135th Field Artillery Regiment, and 136th Field Artillery Regiment.

The 37th DIVARTY was converted, reorganized, and designated the 371st Antiaircraft Artillery Group on 3 July 1946.

The 371st Antiaircraft Artillery Group was converted, reorganized, and designated the 371st Artillery Group on 1 September 1959. From 1959 to 1968, the 137th Air Defense Artillery Regiment was part of the force. 2-137 & 3-137 served with 371 AGAD from 1 September 1959 to 1 February 1968, which 1–137 served with the 137 AGAD, until 1 April 1963, and then transferred to the 371 AGAD, 1 April 1963, to 1 February 1972.

The 371st Artillery Group was converted, reorganized, and designated the 371st Corps Support Group on 1 February 1972.

== Post 9/11 ==
The Group, commanded by COL Rufus J. Smith, deployed from 10 April 2003 to 19 March 2004 to Camp Virginia, Kuwait and Camp Doha, Kuwait support of Operation Iraqi Freedom.

The Group, commanded by COL Michael E. Beasley, deployed from 1–30 September 2005 under Title 32 502(f) in the aftermath of Hurricane Katrina in support of Operation Vigilant Relief. Members of the 371st arrived at Camp Shelby, Mississippi on the morning of 1 Sep – some of the first out-of-state National Guard Soldiers to arrive in Mississippi. Within a day, the 371st combined staffs with the 73rd Troop Command to create Task Force Lee and moved to Hancock High School and Stennis International Airport in Kiln, Mississippi. Task Force Lee managed Points Of Distribution providing water, food, and sundry items to the citizens of Hancock and Pearl River counties.

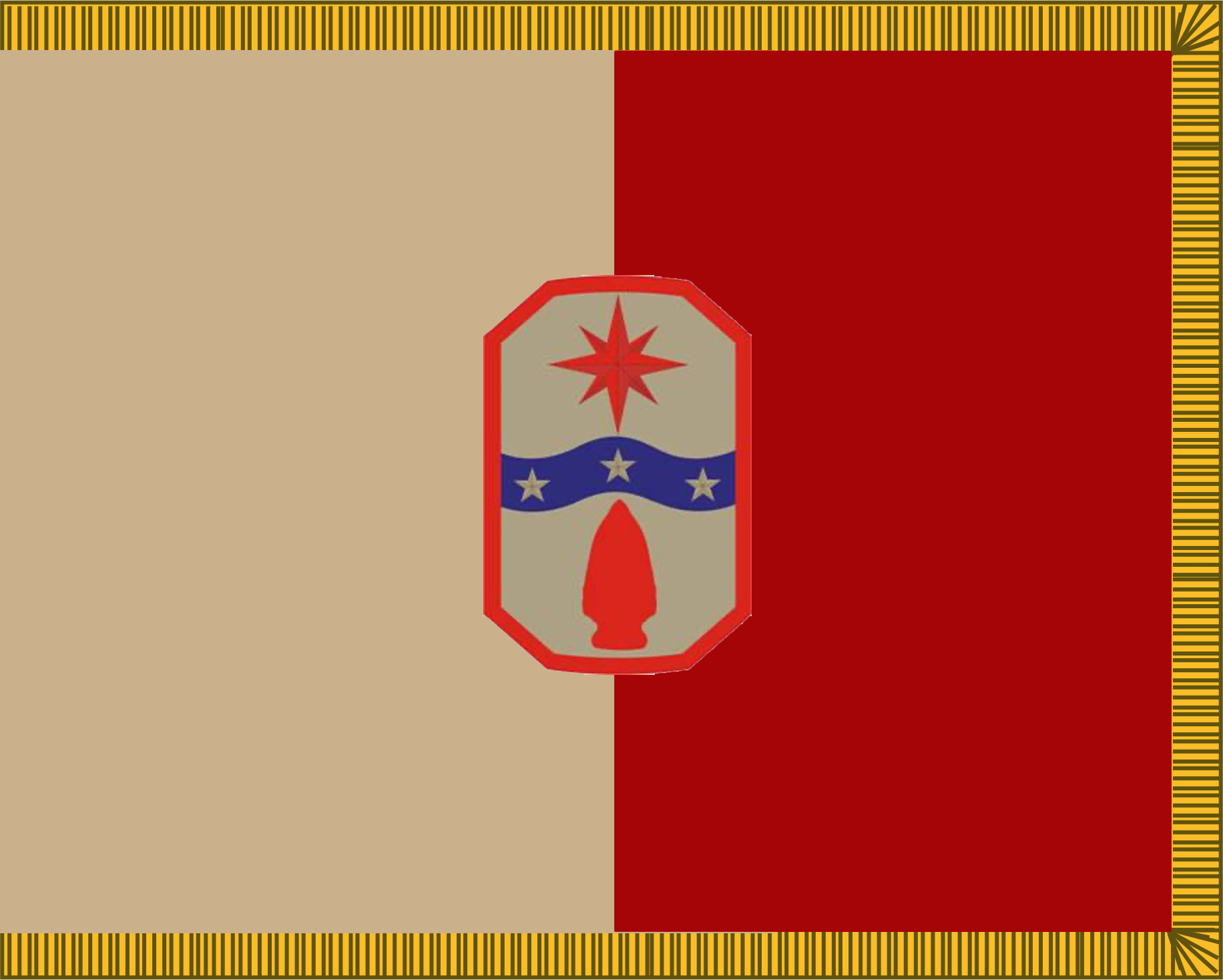
371st Sustainment Brigade Flag

The 371st Corps Support Group was reorganized and designated the 371st Sustainment Brigade on 1 September 2007.

The Brigade, commanded by COL Daniel L. Tack, deployed from 27 July 2008 to 9 April 2009 to Al-Asad Airbase, Iraq in support of Operation Iraqi Freedom. The 371st Sustainment Brigade supported II Marine Expeditionary Force (Forward), a division-sized air-ground task force, enabling Multi-National Force West (MNF-W) to control Al Anbar province during the Iraq Surge and the Iraq Transition during the Anbar campaign.

The Brigade, commanded by COL Gregory W. Robinette, deployed from 19 April 2013 to 1 March 2014 to Camp Arifjan, Kuwait in support of Operation Enduring Freedom. The 371st Sustainment Brigade enabled United States Army Central to conduct Unified Land Operations in Joint Security Area – Georgia, Afghanistan, and Kyrgyzstan shaping combat operations across air, ground, and sea while simultaneously supporting retrograde operations of Iraq resulting in increased sustainment capabilities and strengthening of regional partnerships.

The Brigade, commanded by COL Gregory J. Betts, supported the 28TH Infantry Division's first hosted combined joint Warfighter exercise in November of 2016 at Fort Indiantown Gap, Pennsylvania. The brigade used their real-world knowledge of sustainment challenges in the Middle East to positively influence the exercises sustainment operations supporting 4,500 Service Members representing Army National Guard, Air National Guard, United States Army, United States Air Force, United States Army Reserve, and the British Army.

The Brigade, commanded by COL Gregory J. Betts, deployed from 27 April 2017 to 10 March 2018 to Camp Arifjan, Kuwait in support of Operation Spartan Shield and Operation Inherent Resolve. They supported the 29th Infantry Division and the 35th Infantry Division in building partner capacity in the Middle East to promote regional self-reliance and increase security and supported Combined Joint Task Force – Operation Inherent Resolve, a multi-national force fighting ISIL in Iraq, Syria, and Libya, during the Battle of Hawija and 2017 Western Iraq campaign in 2017.

Commanded by COL Mark A. Hatfield, the brigade was activated as Joint Task Force Fox from 14 June 2020 until 1 OCT 2021 under Title 32 502(f) in response to the State of Ohio's fight against Novel Coronavirus Disease 2019 (COVID-19). The JTF provided logistical and operational support at community-based COVID testing and vaccination sites, medical support to nursing facilities, support to 15 foodbanks around Ohio, support to the Ohio Department of Rehabilitation and Corrections, support to the Ohio Department of Aging, the Ohio Department of Health, and the Ohio Department of Job and Family Services.

As the United States Army's focus returns from counter insurgency to large-scale combat operations, the brigade expects to align with an infantry division for the first time since 1946.

== Structure ==
As of February 2026 the 28th Division Sustainment Brigade consists of the following units:

- 28th Division Sustainment Brigade, in Springfield (OH) (part of 28th Infantry Division)
  - 28th Division Sustainment Troops Battalion, in Springfield (OH)
    - Headquarters and Headquarters Company, 28th Division Sustainment Brigade, in Springfield (OH)
      - Detachment 1, Headquarters and Headquarters Company, 28th Division Sustainment Brigade, in Newark (OH)
    - 137th Signal Company, in Springfield (OH)
    - 211th Ordnance Company (Support Maintenance), in Newark (OH)
    - 212th Ordnance Company (Support Maintenance), in Medina (OH)
    - 871st Quartermaster Platoon (Field Feeding), in Newton Falls (OH)
    - 874th Quartermaster Platoon (Field Feeding), in Newton Falls (OH)
    - 1937th Support Detachment (Contracting Team), in Columbus (OH)
  - 112th Medical Battalion (Multifunctional), in Columbus (OH)
    - Headquarters and Headquarters Detachment, 112th Medical Battalion (Multifunctional), in Columbus (OH)
    - 285th Medical Company (Area Support), in Columbus (OH)
    - 684th Medical Company (Area Support), in Columbus (OH)
  - 112th Transportation Battalion (Motor), in North Canton (OH)
    - Headquarters and Headquarters Detachment, 112th Transportation Battalion (Motor), in North Canton (OH)
    - 1482nd Transportation Company (Medium Truck) (Cargo), in Columbus (OH)
    - 1483rd Transportation Company (Medium Truck) (Cargo), in Walbridge (OH)
    - 1484th Transportation Company (Light-Medium Truck), in North Canton (OH)
    - 1485th Transportation Company (Medium Truck) (Cargo), in Coshocton (OH)
      - Detachment 1, 1485th Transportation Company (Medium Truck) (Cargo), in Dover (OH)
    - 1486th Transportation Company (Medium Truck) (Cargo), in Mansfield (OH)
    - 1487th Transportation Company (Medium Truck) (Cargo), in Piqua (OH)
  - 728th Division Sustainment Support Battalion, in Spring City (PA) (Pennsylvania Army National Guard)
    - Headquarters & Headquarters Company, 728th Division Sustainment Support Battalion, in Spring City (PA)
    - Company A (Composite Supply Company), 728th Division Sustainment Support Battalion, in Southampton (PA)
    - Company B (Support Maintenance Company), 728th Division Sustainment Support Battalion, at Fort Indiantown Gap (PA)
    - Company C (Composite Truck Company), 728th Division Sustainment Support Battalion, in Phoenixville (PA)

== Commanders ==
- 371st Antiaircraft Artillery Group
  - MG (then COL) Wilber H. Fricke 1946–57
  - COL T. Dye Barnhouse 1957–59
- 371st Artillery Group
  - MG (then COL) Charles H. Jones 1959–64
  - MG (then COL) James C. Clem 1964–67
  - COL Edwin C. Girton 1967–71
  - COL Thomas A. Herzog 1971–72
- 371st Support Group
  - BG (then COL) David W. Wayt 1972–1976
  - COL Ronald Bebout 1976–77
  - COL Charles Conner Jr. 1977–83
  - COL David E. Smith 1983–85
  - BG (then COL) William A. Laprise 1985–90
  - COL Harry Shaw III 1990–93
  - COL Donald Nelson 1993–95
  - BG (then COL) Kenneth B. Robinson 1995–97
  - COL James Simpson 1997–98
  - BG (then COL) Jack E. Lee 1998–2000
  - BG (then COL) Michael W. McHenry 2000–02
  - BG (then COL) Rufus J. Smith 2003–04
  - COL Michael E. Beasley 2004–07
- 371st Sustainment Brigade
  - COL Daniel L. Tack 2007–10
  - BG (then COL) Maria E. Kelly 2010–11
  - COL Gregory W. Robinette 2011–14
  - COL Mark J. Cappone 2014–15
  - COL Thomas E. Haidet 2015–16
  - COL Gregory J. Betts 2016–18
  - COL Gerald W. Bodnar 2018–19
  - COL Mark A. Hatfield 2019–20
  - COL Ovid Villarreal Jr. 2020–22
  - COL Michael H. Burgett 2022–present

== Legacy ==
Since the beginning of the 21st century, the brigade has deployed more than any United States Army Sustainment Brigade and earned a Meritorious Unit Commendation for each overseas deployment.

== Unit Decorations ==
Ribbon	Award	Year	Notes
	Meritorious Unit Commendation (Army)	2003–2004	for Iraq
	Meritorious Unit Commendation (Army)	2007–2008	for Iraq Surge and Sovereignty
	Meritorious Unit Commendation (Army)	2013–2014	for service in Central Asia
	Meritorious Unit Commendation (Army)	2017–2018	for service in Central Asia

== See also ==
- Transformation of the United States Army

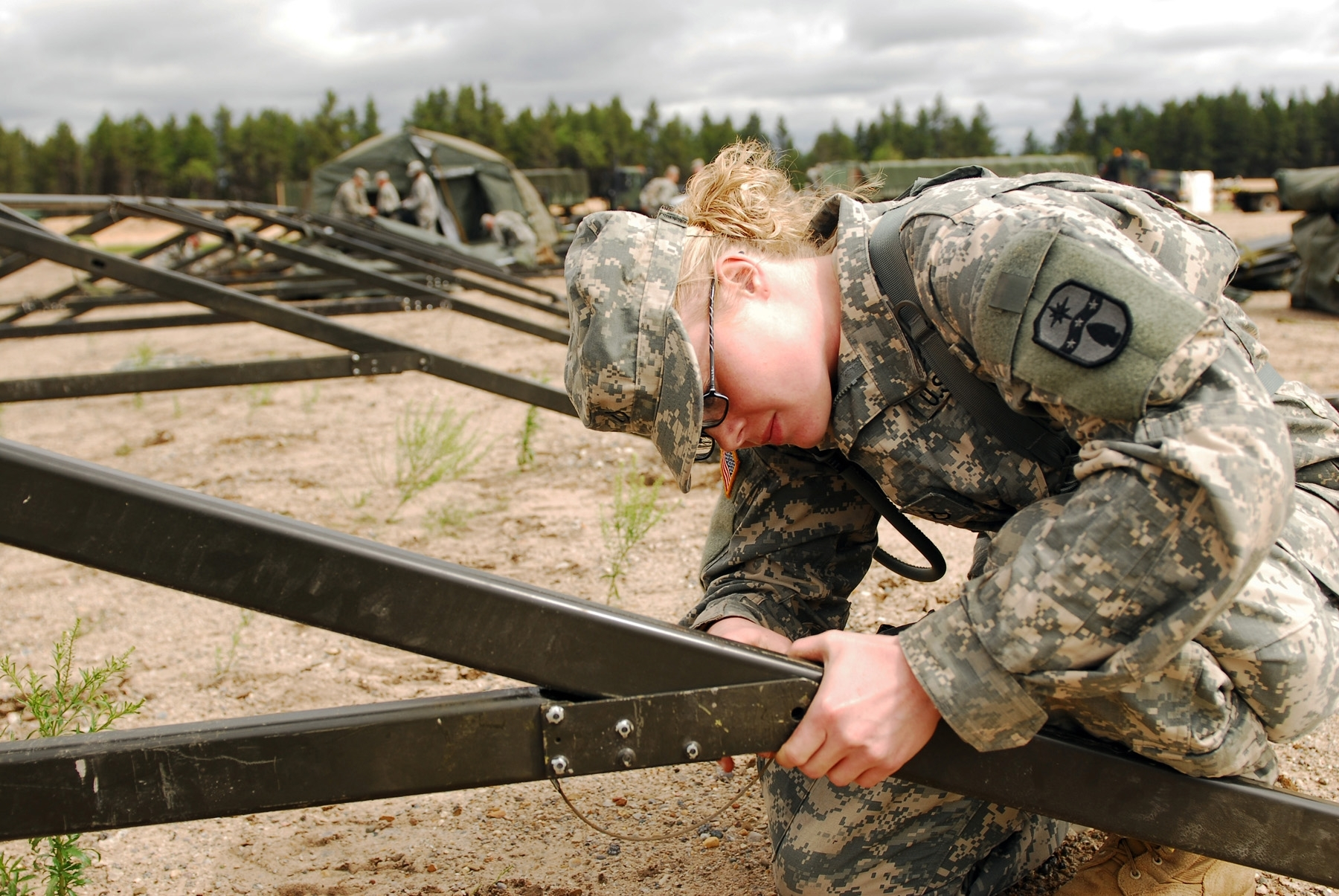
A soldier of the brigade builds a barracks during an exercise in Michigan in 2008.
