= 202nd Regiment =

202nd Regiment may refer to:

- 202nd Air Defense Artillery Regiment, United States
- 202nd Pennsylvania Infantry Regiment, Union Army, American Civil War

== See also ==
- Troop B, 202nd Cavalry Regiment, United States
- 202nd Division (disambiguation)
- 202nd Brigade (disambiguation)
- 202nd (disambiguation)
