= 202 (disambiguation) =

202 may refer to:

- 202 (year)
- 202 (number)
- Bandvagn 202, an amphibious oversnow tracked articulated, all-terrain vehicle
- Peugeot 202, a supermini car
- "Pacific 202", a 1989 album track by 808 State

== See also ==
- 202nd (disambiguation)
- Flight 202 (disambiguation)
