= 44th Chemical Battalion =

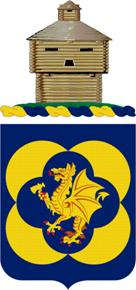
- Coat of Arms of the 44th Chemical Battalion
- Active: 1989–1997; 2003–present
- Country: United States
- Branch: United States Army National Guard (Illinois Army National Guard)
- Role: Chemical defense
- Part of: 404th Maneuver Enhancement Brigade
- Garrison/HQ: Macomb, Illinois
- Motto(s): Pride Integrity Courage

Insignia
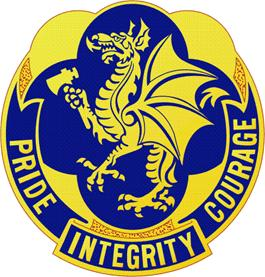
- Distinctive Unit Insignia

The 44th Chemical Battalion is a chemical defense battalion of the Illinois Army National Guard, organized in 2008. It is headquartered at Macomb, Illinois, part of the 404th Maneuver Enhancement Brigade, formerly a chemical brigade.

A previous unit with the same designation was organized in 1989, headquartered at Sycamore and then Machesney Park as part of the 404th Chemical Brigade before its 1997 inactivation.

== History ==
A unit with the same designation was headquartered at Sycamore as part of the 404th Chemical Brigade, organized on 1 July 1989 and activated in September of that year. It included the 244th Chemical Company (Smoke) at Rockford and the 444th Chemical Company (Decontamination) at Freeport, and the latter's Detachment 1 at Galva. After returning from summer training at Fort McCoy in August 1993, the 62-man headquarters of the battalion was mobilized for flood relief duty along the Mississippi River at Quincy in response to the Great Flood of 1993. It was relocated to Machesney Park on 1 October 1995; the Sycamore armory was taken over by the newly activated Battery C, 2nd Battalion, 122nd Field Artillery. The battalion was officially inactivated by orders effective 1 September 1997 along with the brigade.

The current battalion was constituted 1 September 2005 in the Illinois Army National Guard as Headquarters and Headquarters Detachment, 44th Chemical Battalion, and three years later organized and Federally recognized on 5 August 2008. The battalion initially included the 135th Chemical Company at Machesney Park, the 444th Chemical Company (Combat Support) at Monmouth, and the 445th Chemical Company at East St. Louis. Before being constituted it was on Carrier status. After 2007 the 444th Chemical Company was relocated to the new Galesburg Readiness Center. In 2010, the 445th Chemical Company was relocated to Shiloh. The battalion also includes 450th Chemical Detachment at Macomb.

The 150-strong 135th Chemical Company was mobilized for Operation Enduring Freedom – Afghanistan in September 2008, serving on convoy security duty at Camp Phoenix with the 33rd Infantry Brigade Combat Team Task Force Phoenix. Eight of its personnel received Bronze Stars for actions during the deployment before it returned to the United States in September 2009. The 445th Chemical Company also deployed to Afghanistan at the same time. With about 120 personnel, the 444th Chemical Company was mobilized for a deployment to Kuwait in February 2012, providing security at Camp Virginia before returning to the United States in December.

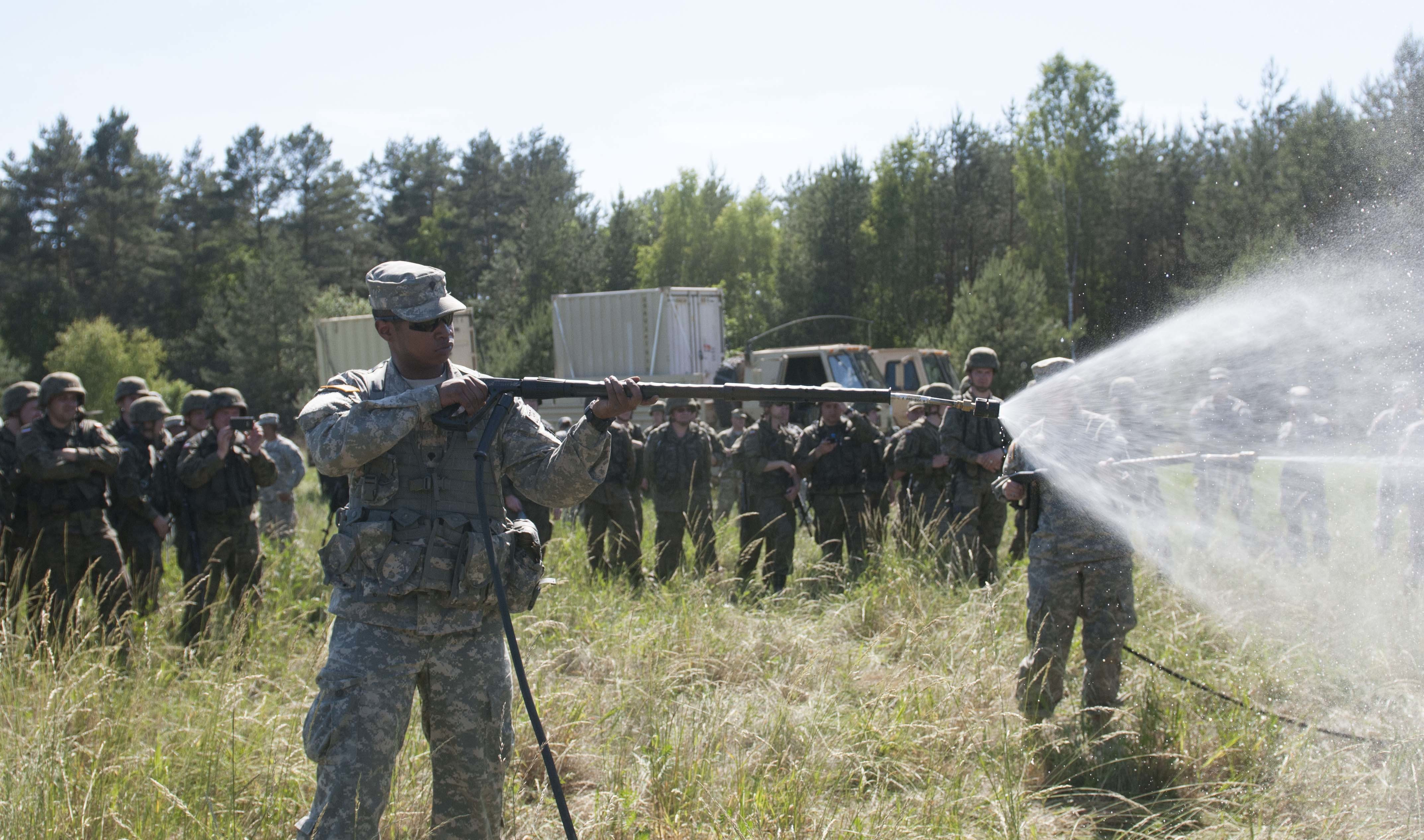
A soldier from the battalion demonstrates equipment to Polish soldiers during Anakonda 2016

In June 2016, the battalion deployed to Poland to practice troop/equipment decontamination and mass casualty evacuation operations during NATO Exercise Anakonda 2016, which ran from June 7 to June 17 at Drawsko Pomorskie Training Area. When it participated in the exercise, the unit included a large number of Polish-American soldiers, many of whom spoke Polish and were familiar with the culture; it had participated in similar exercises since 2006.
