= 202nd Brigade =

202nd Brigade may refer to:

- 202nd (2/1st Kent) Brigade, United Kingdom
- 202nd Independent Infantry Brigade (Home), United Kingdom

== See also ==
- 202nd Division (disambiguation)
