= Maneuver Enhancement Brigade =

Support element of the United States Army

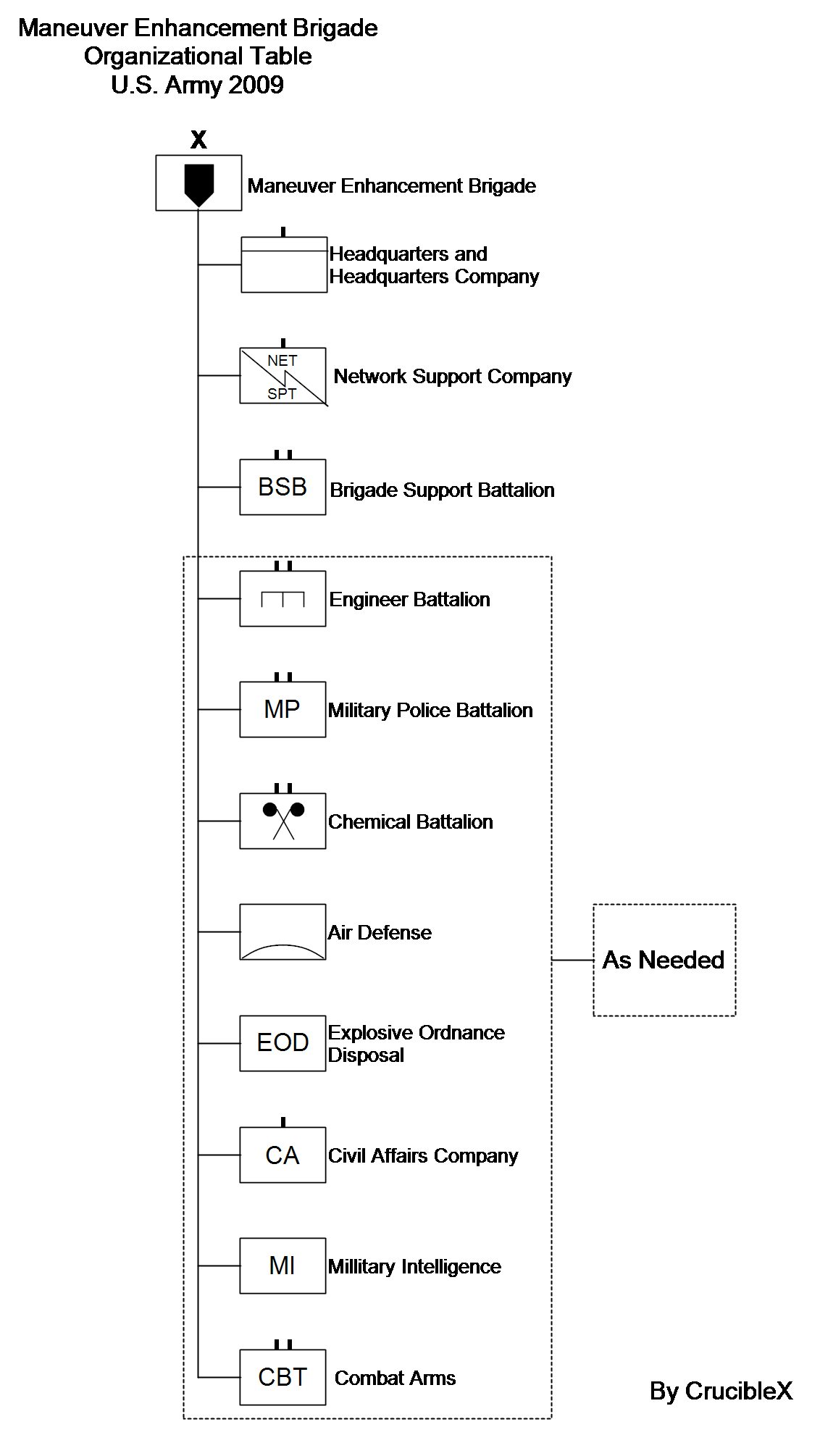
Maneuver Enhancement Brigade Organizational Table

A maneuver enhancement brigade (MEB) is a self-contained, modular, and multifunctional support brigade of the United States Army customized to meet whatever mission it receives. A MEB's primary purpose is to plug into operational formations commanded by corps or division commanders, to support brigade combat teams once deployed, and to conduct tactical level tasks and support. MEBs can provide command and control for up to seven battalions that are capable of owning battlespace in combat.

Battalions assigned to a MEB differ from mission to mission but their specialties typically do not repeat themselves more than twice for a certain type—when a mission dictates more than two of a certain type, the mission likely is not an MEB mission anymore but one more suited to a functional brigade. (Note: Tan (2012) "Typically, what we look at is two of any type of battalion," McCabe said. "That's two engineer battalions, two MP battalions, two chemical battalions and a tactical fighting force.") (Note: Tan (2012) "If a mission dictates more than two of a certain type of battalion, the mission likely is not an MEB mission anymore but one more suited to a functional brigade, he said. For example, if the mission calls for three engineer battalions, the tasking may be better suited to an engineer brigade, he said.") For example, if a mission calls for three engineer battalions, such mission is better suited to an engineer brigade.

== Overview ==
The mission of a MEB is to provide support to the force commander, normally at the division level. The MEB groups together a number of previously dispersed functions in order to achieve this mission. Organic to the MEB is generally a headquarters and headquarters company, a signal company and a brigade support battalion. This force can be augmented by combat engineer, military police, air defense, and/or CBRN defense units. Depending on the mission it may be assigned explosive ordnance disposal, civil affairs or a tactical combat force. They are tailored with the capabilities required for each operation. More than one brigade may be assigned to a division or corps.

Maneuver enhancement brigades are designed to bridge the operational gap between brigade combat teams and functional support brigades. By modern doctrine MEB can control operational areas and are assigned a tactical combat force, usually in the form of a maneuver infantry battalion. A maneuver enhancement brigade’s primary goal is to provide the corps or divisional level commander with a field grade officer led formation that has a large headquarters, capable of controlling a mix of combat engineer, military police, level II medical services, communication units, NBC units and civil affair units. In addition to its attached maneuver combat battalion for security and rear area defense operations.

Unified combatant commanders may also attach these brigades directly to the Army service component command in order to serve in the theater army rear area of operations or joint security area, where the MEB serves as the force protection unit for the US force headquarters.

There are 19 combat support brigades (maneuver enhancement) the Army plans to create, with 16 in the Army National Guard and 3 in the Army Reserve. This organization is one of five types of multifunctional support brigades that have been established under the transformation to the modular force. The other brigades are the sustainment brigade, battlefield surveillance brigade, combat aviation brigade, and fires brigade.

== Maneuver enhancement brigades ==
Unit	Patch	Component	Home Headquarters
26th Maneuver Enhancement Brigade (26th MEB)		National Guard	Massachusetts
55th Maneuver Enhancement Brigade (55th MEB)		National Guard	Pennsylvania
67th Maneuver Enhancement Brigade (67th MEB)		National Guard	Lincoln, Nebraska
110th Maneuver Enhancement Brigade (110th MEB)		National Guard	Missouri
130th Maneuver Enhancement Brigade (130th MEB)		National Guard	North Carolina
136th Maneuver Enhancement Brigade (136th MEB)		National Guard	Texas
141st Maneuver Enhancement Brigade (141st MEB)		National Guard	North Dakota
149th Maneuver Enhancement Brigade (149th MEB)		National Guard	Kentucky
157th Maneuver Enhancement Brigade (157th MEB)		National Guard	Wisconsin
158th Maneuver Enhancement Brigade (158th MEB)		National Guard	Arizona
196th Maneuver Enhancement Brigade (196th MEB)		National Guard	South Dakota
204th Maneuver Enhancement Brigade (204th MEB)		National Guard	Utah
218th Maneuver Enhancement Brigade (218th MEB)		National Guard	South Carolina
226th Maneuver Enhancement Brigade (226th MEB)		National Guard	Alabama
301st Maneuver Enhancement Brigade (301st MEB)		Army Reserve	Washington
302nd Maneuver Enhancement Brigade (302nd MEB)	302nd MEB Patch	Army Reserve	Massachusetts
303rd Maneuver Enhancement Brigade (303rd MEB)		Army Reserve	Hawaii
404th Maneuver Enhancement Brigade (404th MEB)		National Guard	Illinois
648th Maneuver Enhancement Brigade (648th MEB)		National Guard	Georgia

=== Inactivated brigades ===
- 1st Maneuver Enhancement Brigade (1st MEB), active duty – inactivated 2015
- 3rd Maneuver Enhancement Brigade (3rd MEB), active duty – inactivated 2011
- 4th Maneuver Enhancement Brigade (4th MEB), active duty – inactivated 2015
- 92nd Maneuver Enhancement Brigade (92nd MEB), Puerto Rico Army National Guard – became a military police brigade in 2016
- 111th Maneuver Enhancement Brigade (111th MEB), New Mexico Army National Guard – became a sustainment brigade in 2016

=== Cancelled brigades ===
- 2nd Maneuver Enhancement Brigade, activation cancelled in 2010
