= 333rd Military Police Company =

- Active: 1997 – Present
- Country: United States of America
- Allegiance: U.S. Army
- Branch: Army National Guard
- Type: Military Police
- Role: Law Enforcement
- Part of: 33d Military Police Battalion
- Garrison/HQ: Freeport, Illinois
- Nickname: "The Three"

Commanders
- Current commander: Captain Nicholas Klinke

The 333d Military Police Company is a law enforcement unit within the Illinois Army National Guard. The unit is based out of the Freeport Armory in Freeport, Illinois.

== History ==
On September 1, 1997, the 444th Chemical Company was converted into the 333d Military Police Company, which assumed overseas training missions in Panama, Germany, Italy, Nicaragua and Belize. The company's duties in Panama, Germany and Italy were primarily assisting the active-duty component in conducting law-and-order base security. In Nicaragua and Belize, the company was tasked with guarding engineers who built roads, schools and drilled wells for drinking water. The company also escorted medical teams to render care to the local populace.

=== 9/11 ===
Following September 11, 2001, the 333d was activated by Governor George Ryan under Title 32 status for increased security at Illinois commercial airports. The mission, requested by President George W. Bush at Chicago O'Hare Airport on September 27, was to provide a trained and armed military security presence to reinforce the civilian security function. Soldiers reported for duty at the armory on September 28.

=== Iraq ===
In February 2003, the unit was activated in support of Operation Iraqi Freedom and deployed to Iraq in May of the same year. In 2004, its year long tour was extended by the Pentagon for 90 days, after the company had arrived safely in Kuwait. The unit's troops were among 20,000 soldiers whose deployments were extended because of the surge of violence in Iraq. For the remaining two months, the company was stationed at the infamous Abu Ghraib prison, where one soldier, Sgt. Landis Garrison, lost his life as a result of non-hostile causes.

=== Afghanistan ===
From 2008 to 2009, the 333d served as a force protection unit, guarding U.S. troop perimeters and escorting convoys in Afghanistan in support of Operation Enduring Freedom.

== Commanders ==
Former and present company commanders:

- Captain Nicholas Klinke, 2016–Present
- Captain Kyle Scifert, 2014 - 2016
- Captain Jacob Beard, 2012 - 2014
- Christopher Dieball, 2010 - 2012
- Captain Michael Eastridge, 2009 - 2010
- Captain Eric T. Comiza, 2005 - 2009
- Captain Ronald Bonesz, 2001 - 2005
- Captain Brian Martin, 2001
- Michael Pauling 1996-1998
- Marc Schwarzkopf
