= 51st Military Police Battalion =

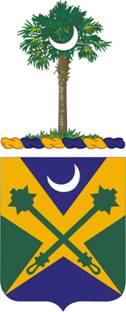
- 51st Military Police Battalion Coat of Arms
- Active: 1968–present
- Country: United States
- Allegiance: State of South Carolina
- Branch: National Guard
- Type: Battalion
- Role: Military Police
- Part of: SCARNG
- Garrison/HQ: Florence, South Carolina
- Motto: "Ready to Respond"
- Colors: Green and Gold

Commanders
- Current commander: LTC Susan Hughes
- Notable commanders: Lt. Col. Erika Perry

Insignia
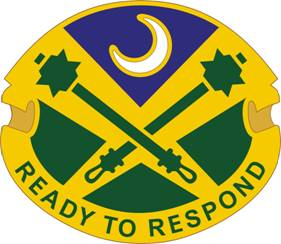
- Distinctive Unit Insignia

The 51st Military Police Battalion is a military police battalion of the South Carolina Army National Guard. The battalion headquarters is in Florence, South Carolina with subordinate units in West Columbia and Timmonsville.

== History ==
=== Coast artillery ===
The Florence unit whose lineage is continued by the 51st Military Police Battalion headquarters and headquarters detachment began on 6 December 1926 as Battery A of the 263rd Coast Artillery Battalion. The battalion was redesignated as a regiment, the 263rd Coast Artillery, on 10 June 1930. A second Florence coast artillery unit, Headquarters Battery, 1st Battalion, 263rd Coast Artillery, was organized on 15 April 1940. The descendant of the 263rd Coast Artillery, the whole regiment, itself, rather than just Batteries A and HQ, is now the 263rd Army Air and Missile Defense Command. The 263rd Coast Artillery was called up for Federal service on 13 January 1941 and spent World War II manning the defenses of Charleston Harbor. The 263rd Coast Artillery was broken up at Fort Bragg on 1 October 1944, with the Headquarters Battery of the 1st Battalion disbanded and Battery A being redesignated as the 248th Coast Artillery Battery. The 248th was itself inactivated on 10 November at Fort Bragg.

=== Antiaircraft artillery and infantry ===
The South Carolina National Guard was reformed postwar. Battery D of the 713th Antiaircraft Artillery (AAA) Gun Battalion, reorganized and Federally recognized on 21 March 1947, continued the lineage of both Florence coast artillery units. In the following years two new Florence units were organized: Company I of the 118th Infantry, part of the 51st Infantry Division, on 10 April 1947 and the Medical Detachment of the 713th AAA Gun Battalion on 3 January 1949. The 713th was called up for Federal service during the Korean War on 15 August 1950 and released back to state control on 14 June 1952. The battalion was redesignated as the 713th AAA Battalion on 1 October 1953 and on 13 May 1958 the medical detachment was redesignated as the Medical Section of the battalion headquarters battery.

Under the Pentomic reorganization of the South Carolina Army National Guard, the three Florence units were consolidated as the headquarters company of the 3rd Battle Group of the 118th Infantry on 1 April 1959. In the ROAD reorganization of 1 January 1963 the battle group was reorganized as the 3rd Battalion, 118th Infantry and the 51st Infantry Division eliminated.

=== Military police ===
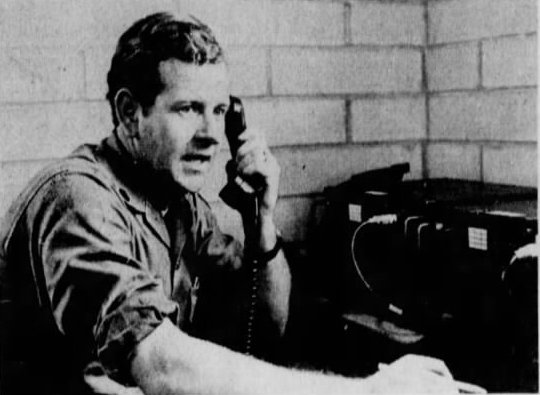
A radio operator of the battalion headquarters receiving a call while setting up the headquarters during 1973 active training at Fort Stewart

The battalion headquarters company was converted into the headquarters and headquarters detachment of the new 51st Military Police Battalion on 1 January 1968 during a reorganization of the South Carolina Army National Guard. The battalion included the 132nd Military Police Company at Florence, the 133rd Military Police Company at Timmonsville, and the 132nd Medical Company (Clearing) at Darlington. In May 1969 the 132nd and 133rd Military Police Companies were called up for state active duty in response to the 1969 Charleston hospital strike. They spent a week in Charleston confronting the strikers.

In May 1973, two women who joined the 132nd Medical Company became the first women in the previously all-male South Carolina Army National Guard. The battalion headquarters participated in two-week annual training at Fort Stewart during the summer of 1973 together with other South Carolina Army National Guard units of the 2nd Brigade, 30th Infantry Division.

As of 2010 it also included the 131st Military Police Company at Beaufort, converted in 2008 from Troop B, 202nd Cavalry as a result of the elimination of the 218th Infantry Brigade.

== Subordinate Units ==
- Headquarters and Headquarters Detachment (HHD), Florence
- 132nd Military Police Company (132nd MPC) (Combat Support), West Columbia
- 133rd Military Police Company (133rd MPC) (Combat Support), Timmonsville

== List of Commanders ==
Commander	From	To
LTC Lawrence Miller		2010
LTC Stanley O'Neal	2010	
LTC Jason Turner		
LTC Erika Perry		July 15th, 2020
LTC Michael Jones	July 15th, 2020	Nov 2022
LTC Susan Hughes	Nov 2022	2026
LTC Green	2026	Present
