= 136th Maneuver Enhancement Brigade =

136th Maneuver Enhancement Brigade (JTF-136)
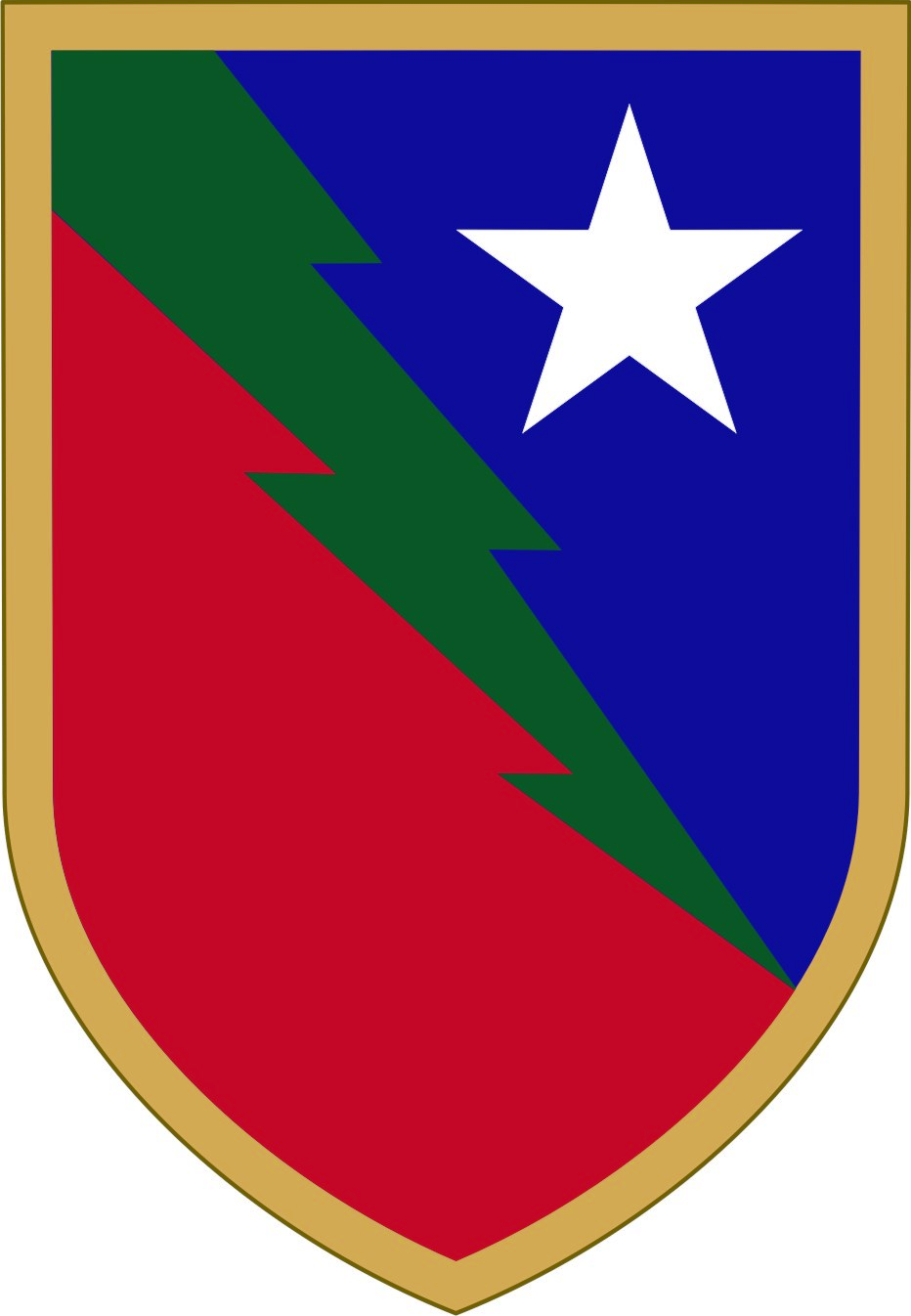
- Active: 2008 – present
- Country: United States
- Allegiance: Texas Army National Guard
- Branch: United States Army National Guard
- Role: Maneuver Enhancement
- Size: Brigade
- Part of: 36th Infantry Division (United States)
- Garrison/HQ: Round Rock, Texas
- Motto: Venio Cito (Come Quickly)
- Engagements: World War I Champagne-Marne; Aisne-Marne; St. Mihiel; Meuse-Argonne; Lorraine; Champagne

Commanders
- Current commander: Col. Joshua Pritchett
- Command Sergeant Major: CSM Dale Williams
- Notable commanders: Col. Ernest O. Thompson, 111th Quartermaster Regiment

Insignia
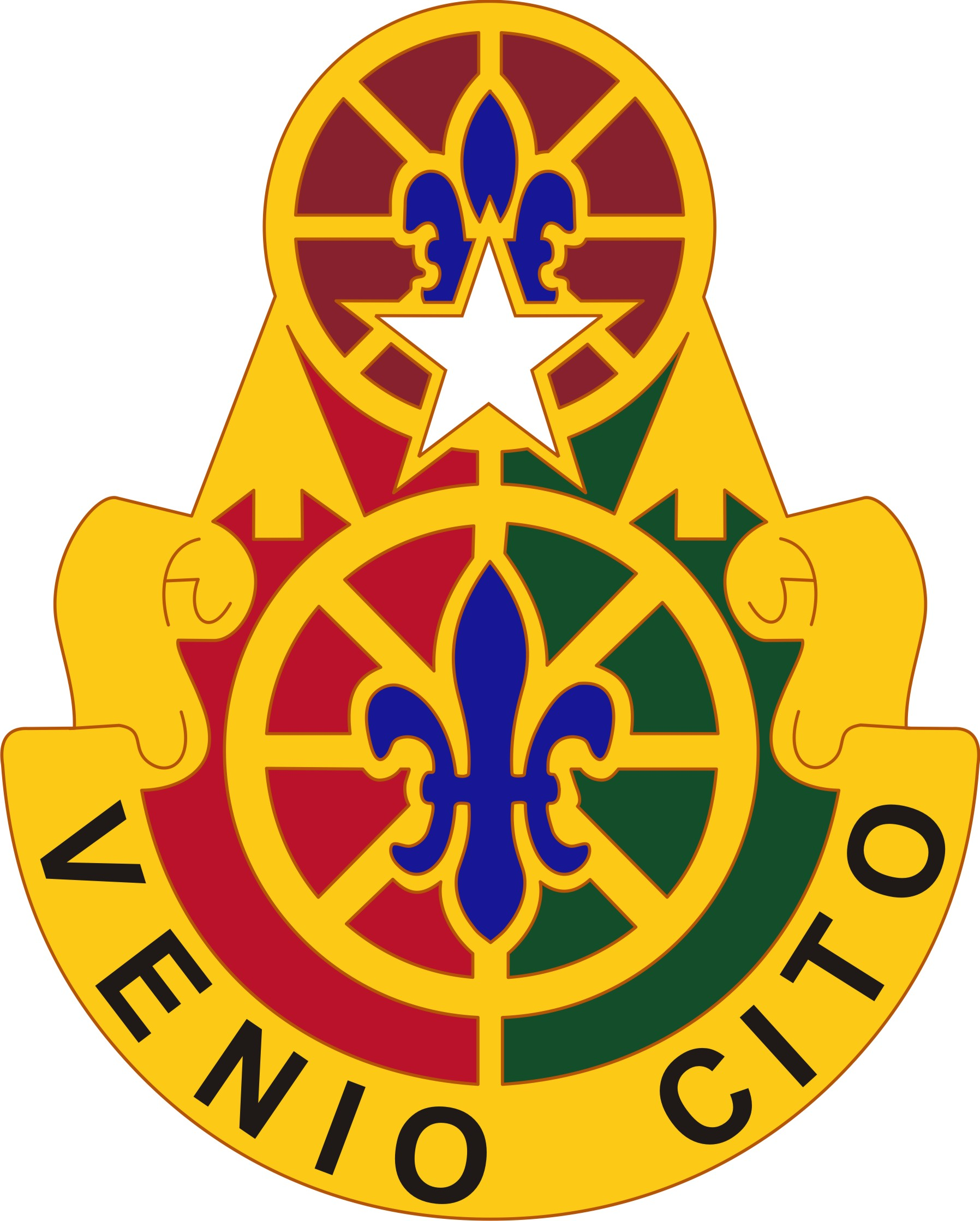
- 136th Maneuver Enhancement Brigade DUI

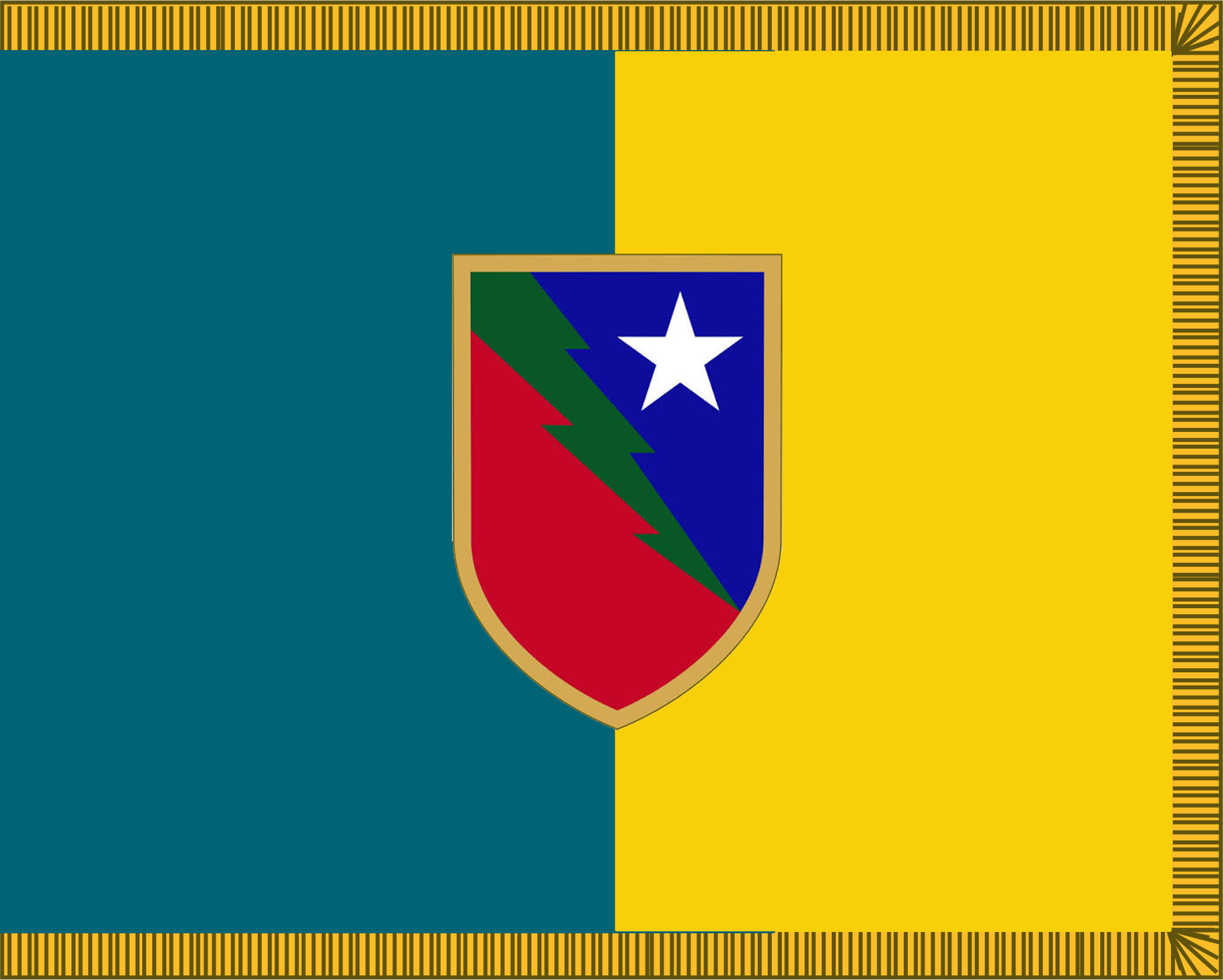
- 136th Maneuver Enhancement Brigade Flag

The 136th Maneuver Enhancement Brigade (MEB) is a unit of the Texas National Guard since 2008. The unit has a long lineage in Texas, beginning in 1917 as the 117th Supply Train of the 42nd Infantry Division. It was reorganized as the 111th Quartermaster Regiment, 36th Infantry Division in 1936, and again in 1942 as the 36th Quartermaster Co.

By March 1963, the unit was known as HHC, 111th Supply and Transport Battalion, and in 1968 as the 111th Transportation Group. It was redesignated again in 1975 as the 111th Area Support Group. Today it is known both as (Joint Task Force) JTF-136 MEB and the 136th MEB.

The mission of the 136 MEB is to support units in a deployment by securing route access, providing security and destroying threats in the rear areas.

== Organization ==
- 136th Maneuver Enhancement Brigade, in Round Rock
  - Headquarters Support Company, 136th Maneuver Enhancement Brigade, in Round Rock
  - 6th Civil Support Team (WMD), at Camp Mabry
  - 436th Chemical Company, in Laredo
    - Detachment 1, 436th Chemical Company, in Round Rock
  - 454th Engineer Company (Clearance), in Kingsville
  - 625th Signal Company, in Round Rock
  - 4th Battalion, 133rd Field Artillery Regiment, in San Marcos (M142 HIMARS) (part of 45th Field Artillery Brigade)
    - Headquarters and Headquarters Battery, 4th Battalion, 133rd Field Artillery Regiment, in San Marcos
    - Battery A, 4th Battalion, 133rd Field Artillery Regiment, in New Braunfels
    - Battery B, 4th Battalion, 133rd Field Artillery Regiment, in San Marcos
      - Detachment 1, Battery B, 4th Battalion, 133rd Field Artillery Regiment, in Wichita Falls
    - 133rd Forward Support Company, in San Marcos
      - Detachment 1, 133rd Forward Support Company, in Wichita Falls
  - 136th Military Police Battalion, in Tyler
    - Headquarters and Headquarters Detachment, 136th Military Police Battalion, in Tyler
    - 236th Military Police Company (Combat Support), at Joint Base San Antonio
    - 606th Military Police Company (Detention), in El Paso
    - 712th Military Police Company (Combat Support), at Ellington Field
