= 404th Maneuver Enhancement Brigade =

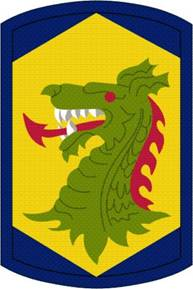
- 404th Maneuver Enhancement Brigade shoulder sleeve insignia
- Active: 2009 - Present
- Country: United States
- Branch: United States Army National Guard
- Type: Maneuver Enhancement Brigade
- Part of: Illinois Army National Guard
- Motto: Dragons Fight

Commanders
- Brigade Commander: COL Jessica McPherson
- Command Sergeant Major: CSM Sarah Roman

Insignia
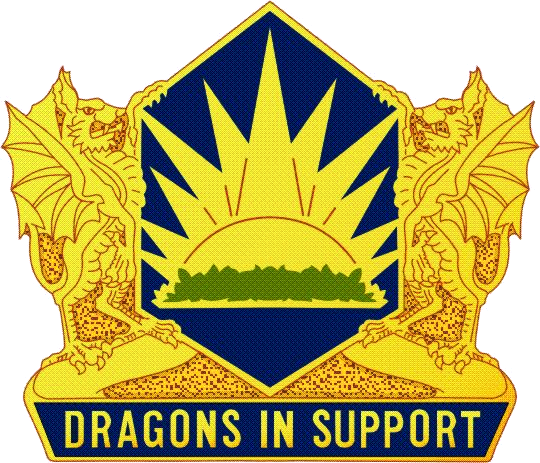
- Distinctive unit insignia

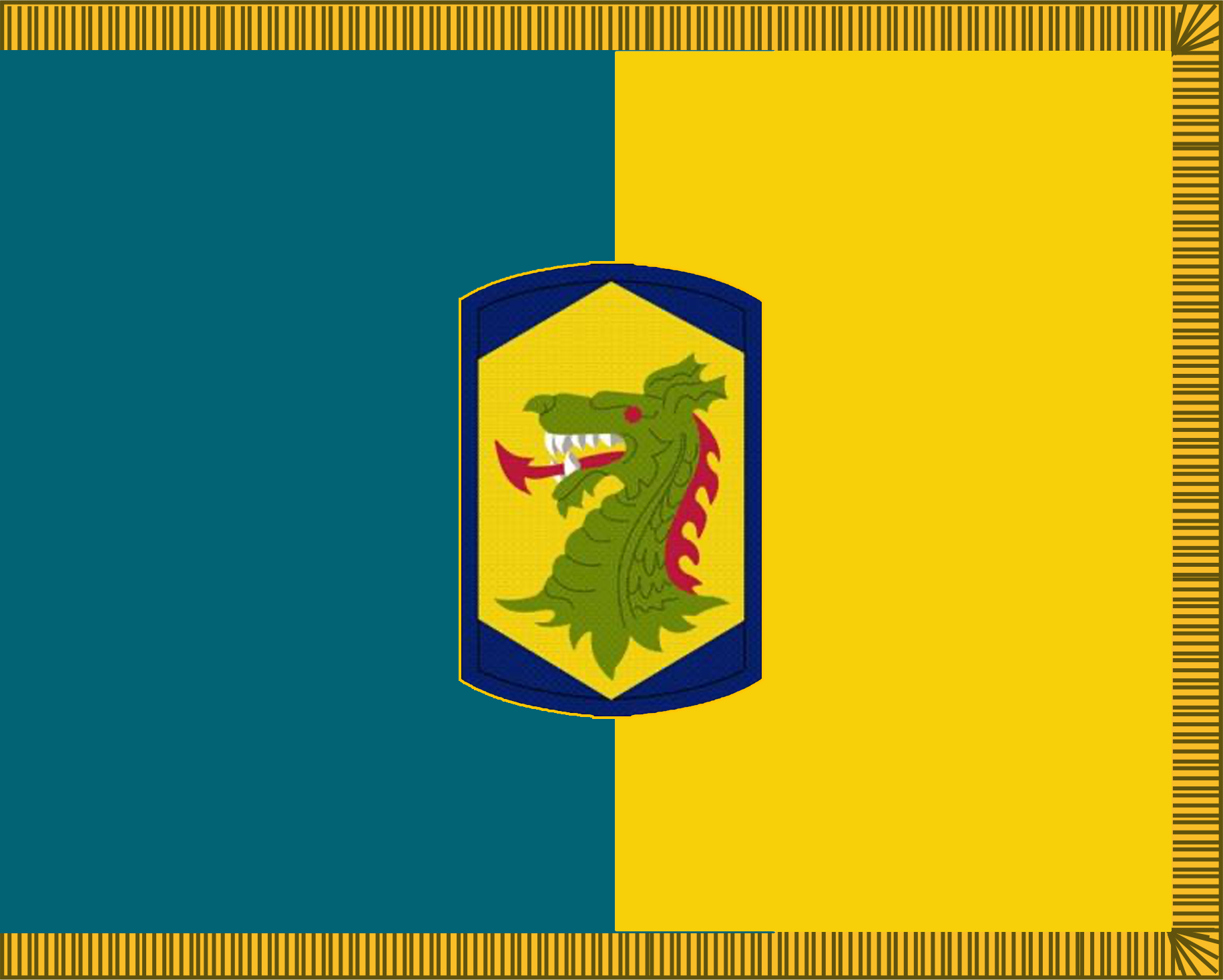
- 404th Maneuver Enhancement Brigade Flag

The 404th Maneuver Enhancement Brigade is a maneuver enhancement brigade of the Illinois Army National Guard.

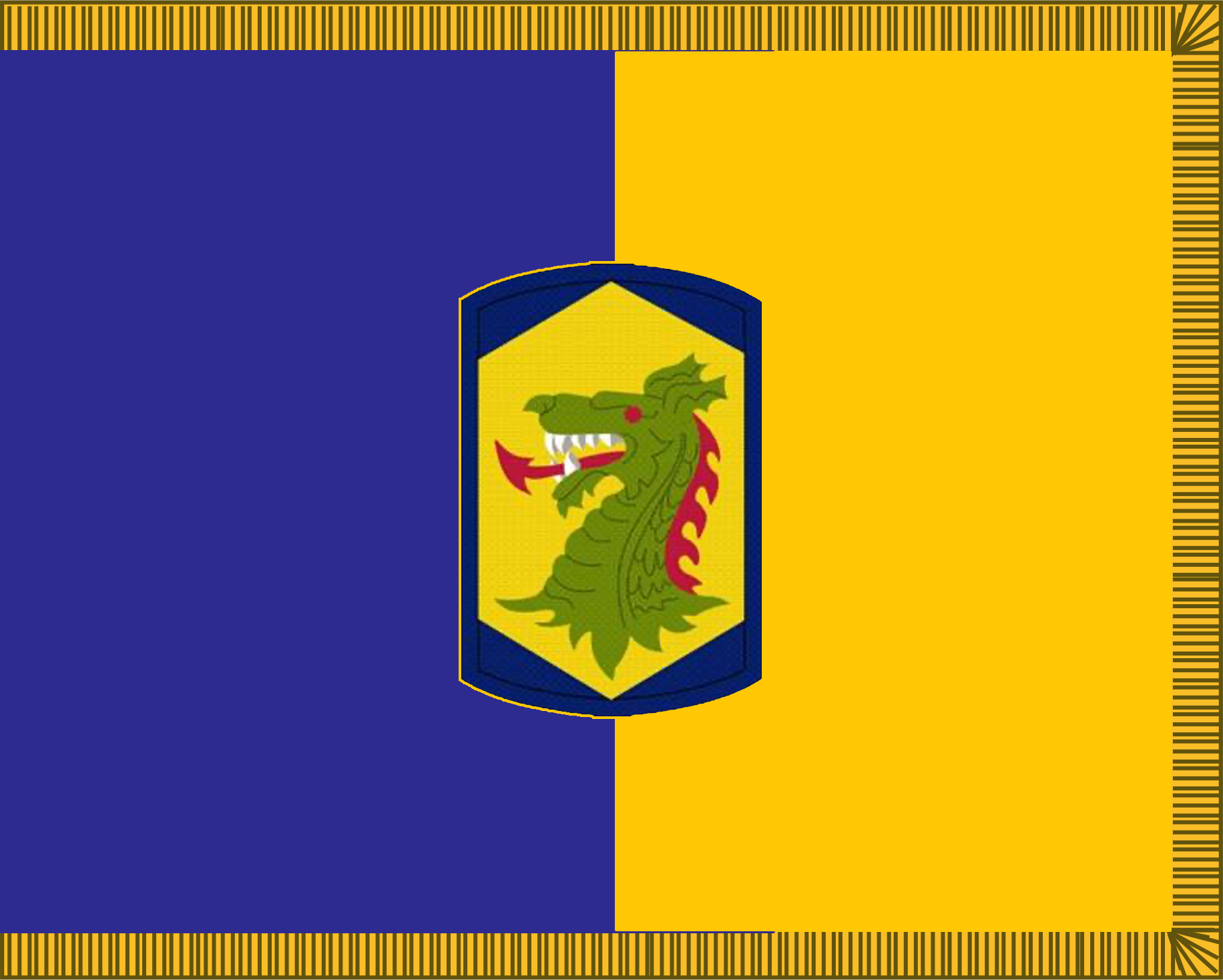
404th Chemical Brigade Flag

Formerly the 404th Chemical Brigade, this unit is tailored to support the maneuver and security of a Division-level headquarters. The Brigade comprises Engineer, Chemical CBRN, Military Police, Signal and Support units.

The Maneuver Enhancement Brigade (MEB) is a relatively new formation within the US Army. It is primarily designed to provide maneuver support to its assigned headquarters with a mix of technical expertise and combat power. However, the structure of a MEB also makes it ideal for consequence management in response to domestic disasters. The MEB's mix of Chemical, Engineer, and Military Police units provides it with the capability to support governmental organizations in chemical/biological/nuclear decontamination, law enforcement support, or infrastructure repair and restoration.

== History ==
The 404th traces its history to the 404th Chemical Brigade, the first Chemical Brigade activated into the Army National Guard force structure. The 404th Chemical Brigade was formed in 1990 and originally stationed in Rockford, Illinois. It included the 44th Chemical Battalion during that period. The unit subsequently moved to Machesney Park, Illinois where it remained until its deactivation in 1997. In 2001, the 404th was reactivated and stationed in Chicago, Illinois. In 2009, the 404th began its transformation process to become the 404th Maneuver Enhancement Brigade.

== Organization ==
As of February 2026 the 404th Maneuver Enhancement Brigade consists of the following units:

- 404th Maneuver Enhancement Brigade, in Normal (IL)
  - Headquarters Support Company, 404th Maneuver Enhancement Brigade, in Normal (IL)
  - 406th Brigade Signal Company (MEB/CAB/SB), in Bloomington (IL)
  - 33rd Military Police Battalion, in Machesney Park (IL)
    - Headquarters and Headquarters Detachment, in Machesney Park (IL)
    - 233rd Military Police Company, in Springfield (IL)
    - 333rd Military Police Company, in Freeport (IL)
    - 933rd Military Police Company, in Fort Sheridan (IL)
  - 44th Chemical Battalion, in Bloomington (IL)
    - Headquarters and Headquarters Company, in Bloomington (IL)
    - 135th Chemical Company, in Machesney Park (IL)
    - 444th Chemical Company, in Galesburg (IL)
    - 445th Chemical Company, in Shiloh (IL)
    - 450th Chemical Detachment, in Bloomington (IL)
  - 123rd Engineer Battalion, in Murphysboro (IL)
    - Headquarters and Headquarters Company, 123rd Engineer Battalion, in Murphysboro (IL)
    - Forward Support Company, 123rd Engineer Battalion, in Murphysboro (IL)
    - 616th Engineer Detachment (Utilities), in Macomb (IL)
    - 631st Engineer Company (Engineer Support Company), in Sparta (IL)
    - 661st Engineer Company (Engineer Construction Company), in Macomb (IL)
    - 615th Engineer Detachment (Fire Fighting Team — HQ), in Sparta (IL)
    - 661st Engineer Detachment (Fire Fighting Team — Fire Truck), in Sparta (IL)
    - 662nd Engineer Detachment (Fire Fighting Team — Fire Truck), in Sparta (IL)
    - 1886th Engineer Detachment (Engineer Facility Detachment), in Springfield (IL)
    - 2118th Engineer Detachment (Asphalt), in Sparta (IL)

== Disbanded Units ==
- 405th Brigade Support Battalion
  - Company A (Distribution)
  - Company B (Maintenance)

== See also ==
- Army National Guard
- Illinois Army National Guard
- Transformation of the United States Army
