= 226th Maneuver Enhancement Brigade =

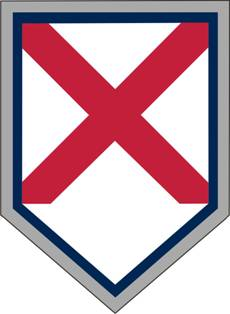
- Shoulder sleeve insignia
- Active: 2005 – present
- Country: United States
- Allegiance: Alabama Army National Guard
- Branch: United States Army National Guard
- Type: Maneuver enhancement
- Size: Brigade
- Part of: 29th Infantry Division (United States)
- Garrison/HQ: Mobile, Alabama
- Motto: Quality in Quantity
- Engagements: Operation Enduring Freedom
- Decorations: Meritorious Unit Commendation

Commanders
- Current commander: Colonel David Worthy

Insignia
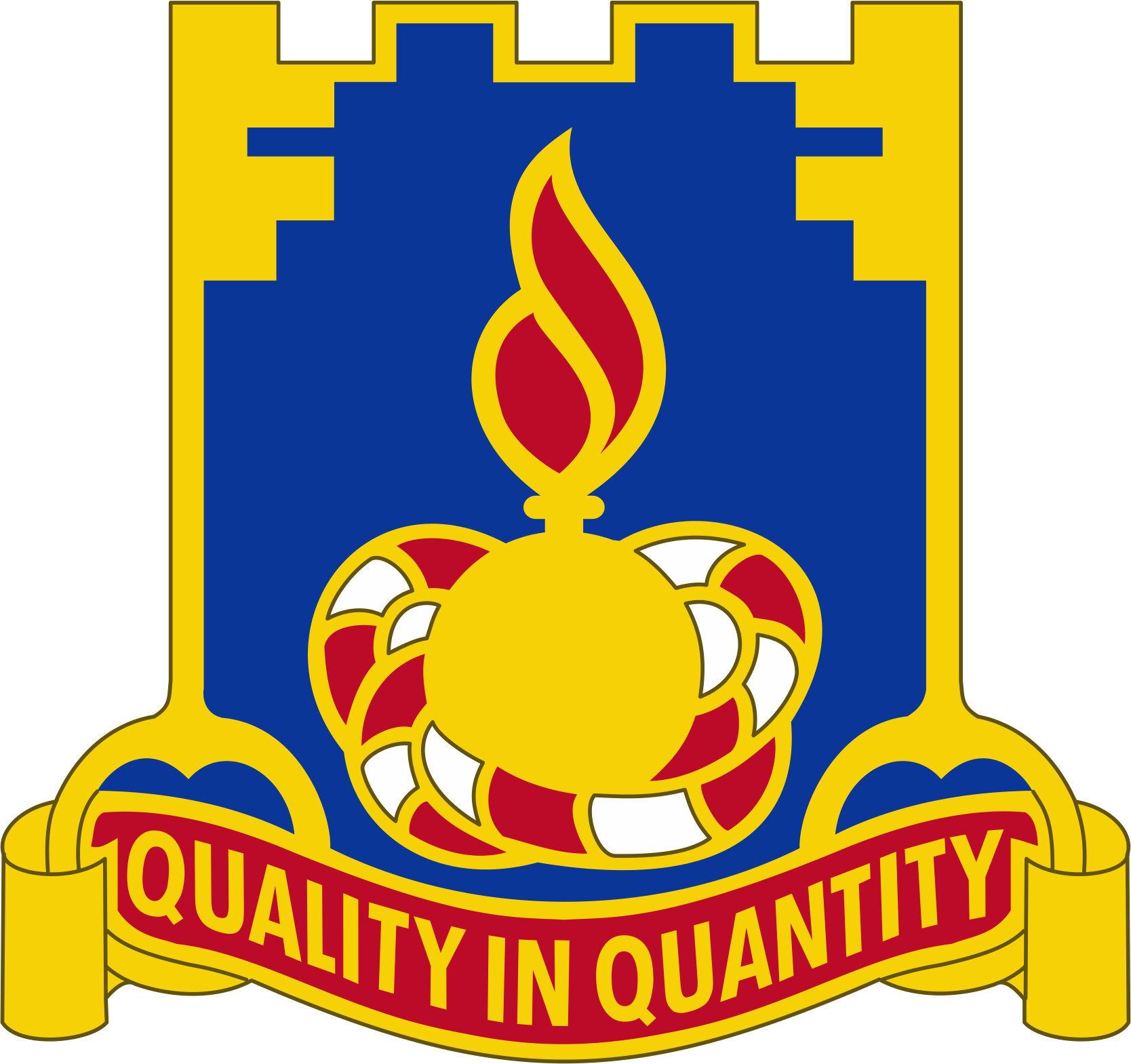
- Distinctive unit insignia

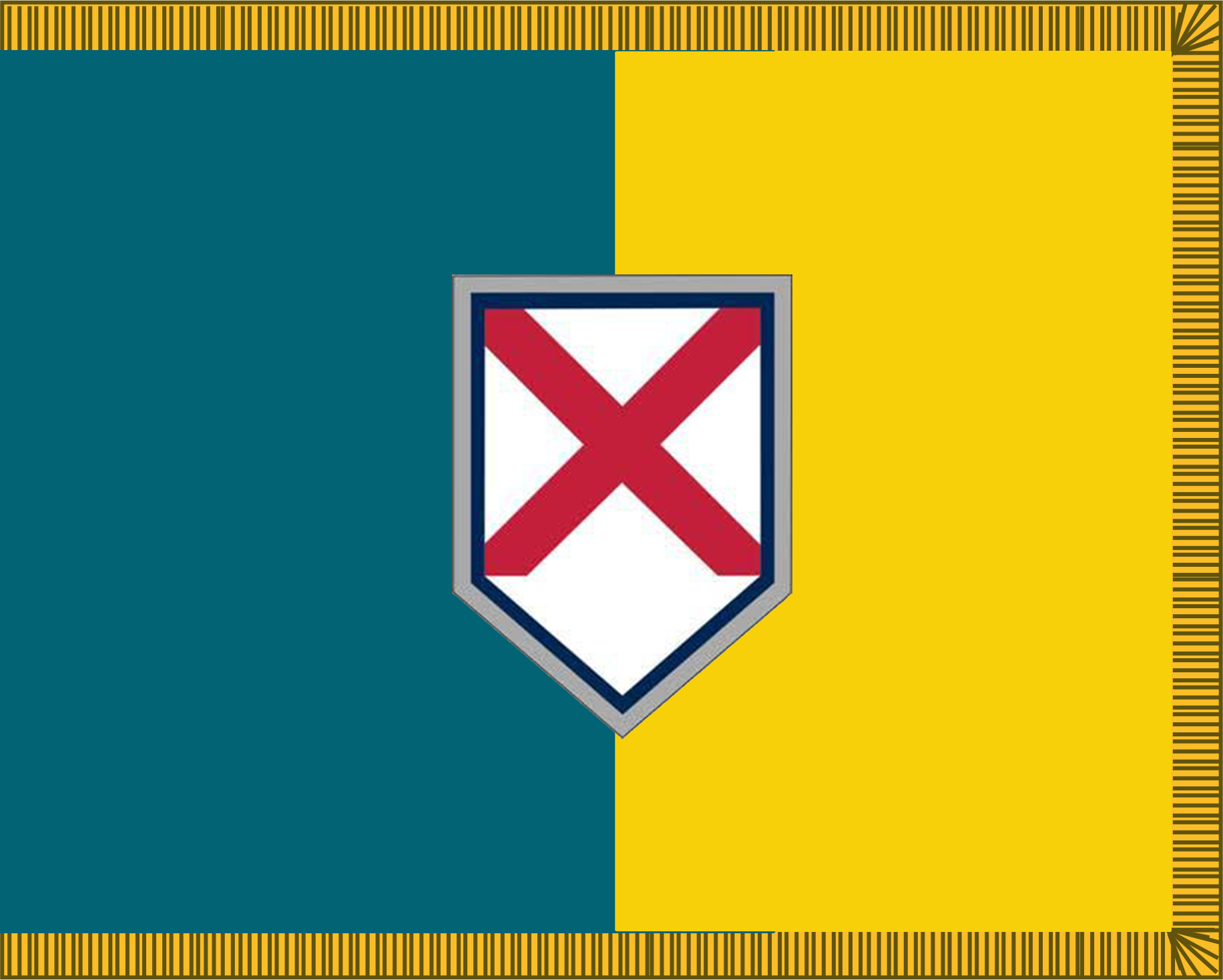
- 226th Maneuver Enhancement Brigade Flag

The 226th Maneuver Enhancement Brigade is a Maneuver Enhancement Brigade (MEB) of the Alabama National Guard. Since 2005, it is assigned to the 62nd Troop Command of the Alabama Army National Guard. It is headquartered at Fort Whiting National Guard Complex in Mobile, Alabama.

The unit took part in Operation Enduring Freedom with the mission to provide force protection and mission command for the five base clusters in Kabul. Between 18 May 2013 and 31 January 2014, the 226th MEB participated in combat and non-combat missions in support of the International Security Assistance Force. For the service in Afghanistan, the brigade was awarded the Meritorious Unit Commendation on 16 May 2014.

== Organization ==
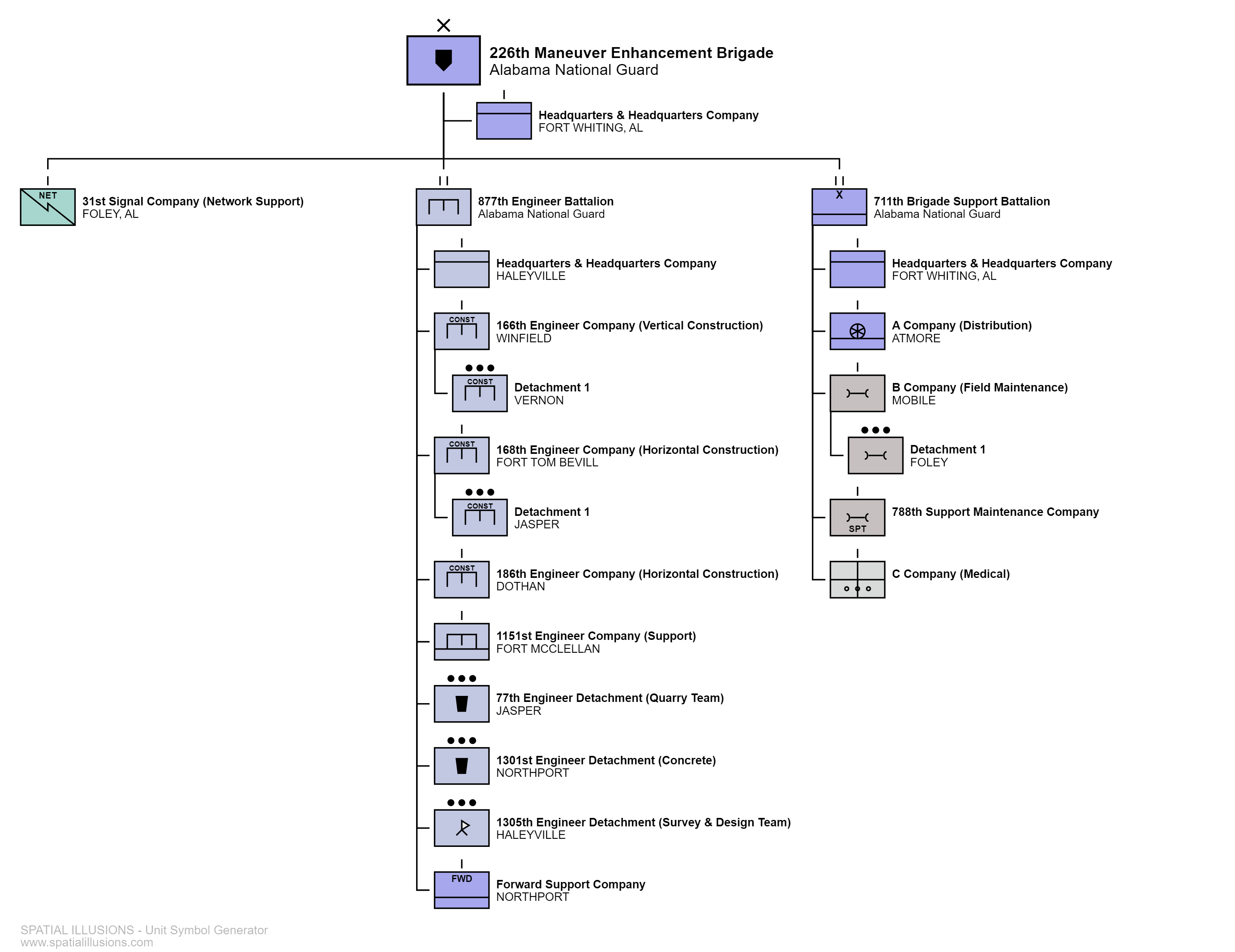
226th Maneuver Enhancement Brigade organization in 2023

- Headquarters and Headquarters Company, in Mobile, Alabama
  - 1st Battalion, 117th Field Artillery Regiment, in Andalusia, Alabama
  - 31st Signal Company, in Foley
  - 877th Engineer Battalion, in Haleyville
    - Forward Support Company, in Northport
    - 166th Engineer Company, in Winfield
    - 168th Engineer Company, in Fayette
    - 186th Engineer Company, in Dothan
    - 1151st Engineer Company, in Huntsville
    - 1301st Engineer Detachment, in Northport
    - 1305th Engineer Detachment, in Haleyville
  - 711th Brigade Support Battalion, in Mobile
    - Company A, in Atmore
    - Company B, in Mobile
    - Company C
