= Troop B, 202nd Cavalry Regiment =

Troop B, 202nd Cavalry (1991–2008); Troop B, 713th Cavalry (1973–1991)
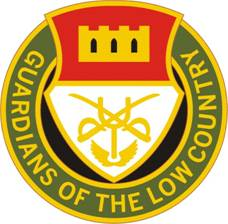
- 202nd Cavalry Distinctive Unit Insignia
- Active: 1973–2008
- Country: United States
- Branch: United States Army
- Type: Reconnaissance
- Part of: 218th Infantry Brigade
- Garrison/HQ: Ridgeland, South Carolina (1974–1991); Beaufort, South Carolina (1991–2008)

Insignia
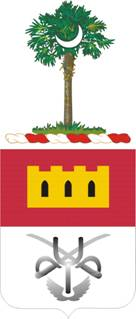
- Coat of Arms

Troop B, 202nd Cavalry was the armored cavalry reconnaissance troop of the 218th Infantry Brigade of the South Carolina Army National Guard from 1991 to 2008. It was redesignated from Troop B, 713th Cavalry, which served in the same role from 1973. Troop B, 713th Cavalry was the only unit assigned to the 713th Cavalry parent regiment under the Combat Arms Regimental System, which carried over to the replacement United States Army Regimental System, and Troop B, 202nd Cavalry was likewise the only unit assigned to the 202nd Cavalry parent regiment under the latter.

Troop B, 713th Cavalry was headquartered at Ridgeland from 1973, having been reorganized from a troop of the 196th Cavalry. The troop included Detachment 1, Troop B, 713th Cavalry at Beaufort. In 1991, Troop B was reflagged as Troop B, 202nd Cavalry and by that point consolidated at Beaufort. It was converted to a military police unit when the 218th Infantry Brigade was eliminated in 2008.

== History ==
The 713th Cavalry was constituted on 19 December 1973 as a Combat Arms Regimental System (CARS) parent regiment in the South Carolina Army National Guard. It was organized on 1 January 1974 to consist of Troop B at Ridgeland, an element of the 218th Infantry Brigade. Troop B had become Troop B, 1st Squadron, 196th Cavalry on 1 January 1971 and was previously the 1053rd Transportation Company. Detachment 1, Troop B at Beaufort was redesignated from Detachment 1, Troop B. On 1 December 1971, it was redesignated as Detachment 1, Troop B, 1st Squadron, 196th Cavalry, and was previously Detachment 1 of the 1053rd Transportation Company.

Troop B served as the reconnaissance troop of the 218th Infantry Brigade (Mechanized). Troop B and the 2nd Battalion, 263rd Armor, the South Carolina Army National Guard armor units, were the first Army National Guard units to receive the M48A5, with the first tanks received by May 1976. The troop ultimately received six M48A5s that formed its tank section. In June 1980, the troop conducted its two-week annual summer training with the 218th Brigade at Fort Stewart. At the time, the company-sized unit included scout and rifle squads, as well as tank and mortar sections. In June 1985, the troop again conducted summer training with the brigade at Fort Stewart. Its 1986 annual training with the 218th Brigade was instead conducted in the winter in January at Fort Pickett, Virginia.

The 713th Cavalry continued to exist as a parent regiment after the United States Army Regimental System (USARS) was implemented for the Army National Guard on 1 June 1989. On 1 October 1991, it reflagged as the 202nd Cavalry, consisting of Troop B at Beaufort. The regiment was not authorized a coat of arms or a distinctive unit insignia. Troop B eventually became known as the Guardians of the Lowcountry after the region that the unit was stationed in. On 1 September 2008 Troop B, 202nd Cavalry was converted into the 131st Military Police Company of the 51st Military Police Battalion as a result of the elimination of the 218th Infantry Brigade.
