= 2nd Maneuver Enhancement Brigade =

- Country: United States
- Branch: U.S. Army
- Part of: FORSCOM
- Garrison/HQ: Fort Drum

The 2nd Maneuver Enhancement Brigade (2nd MEB) was a planned United States Army brigade, which was planned to activate in FY10 at Fort Drum, New York. The 2nd MEB would have been one of four active duty Maneuver Enhancement Brigades. The brigade would have been tasked to improve the movement capabilities and rear area security for commanders at the division level or higher. Activation was cancelled in 2010.

== Mission and function ==
The MEB is a tailored combined arms force with a headquarters staff designed to plan and execute protection, movement and maneuver, and sustainment tasks. It uses its subordinate units within its specialties to conduct maneuver support operations in its area of operations (AO) and within the broader AO of the organization it supports. The MEB provides added security and defense for other units and enhances the freedom of action for the supported higher command. The capability to synchronize maneuver support operations and support area operations under the MEB provides a unique set of capabilities to other Army, joint, and multinational elements. Aside from its headquarters element and the organic communications and logistics elements that form the basis for commanding, controlling, and supporting the brigade, the Brigade is a mission, enemy, terrain and weather, troops and support available, time available, and civil considerations-dependent organization. The MEB leverages the current modular principles and the "plug-and-play" nature of current forces to apply the right force for the mission. Typically, but not exclusively, the MEB is composed of engineers, military police, chemical, air defense, and other units that routinely function together during protection, stability, and support operations.

== Planned composition ==
The 2nd MEB was to be composed of:

- Headquarters & Headquarters Company
- Signal Company
- Brigade Support Battalion
- 7th Engineer Battalion
- 91st Military Police Battalion
