= 106th Aviation Regiment =

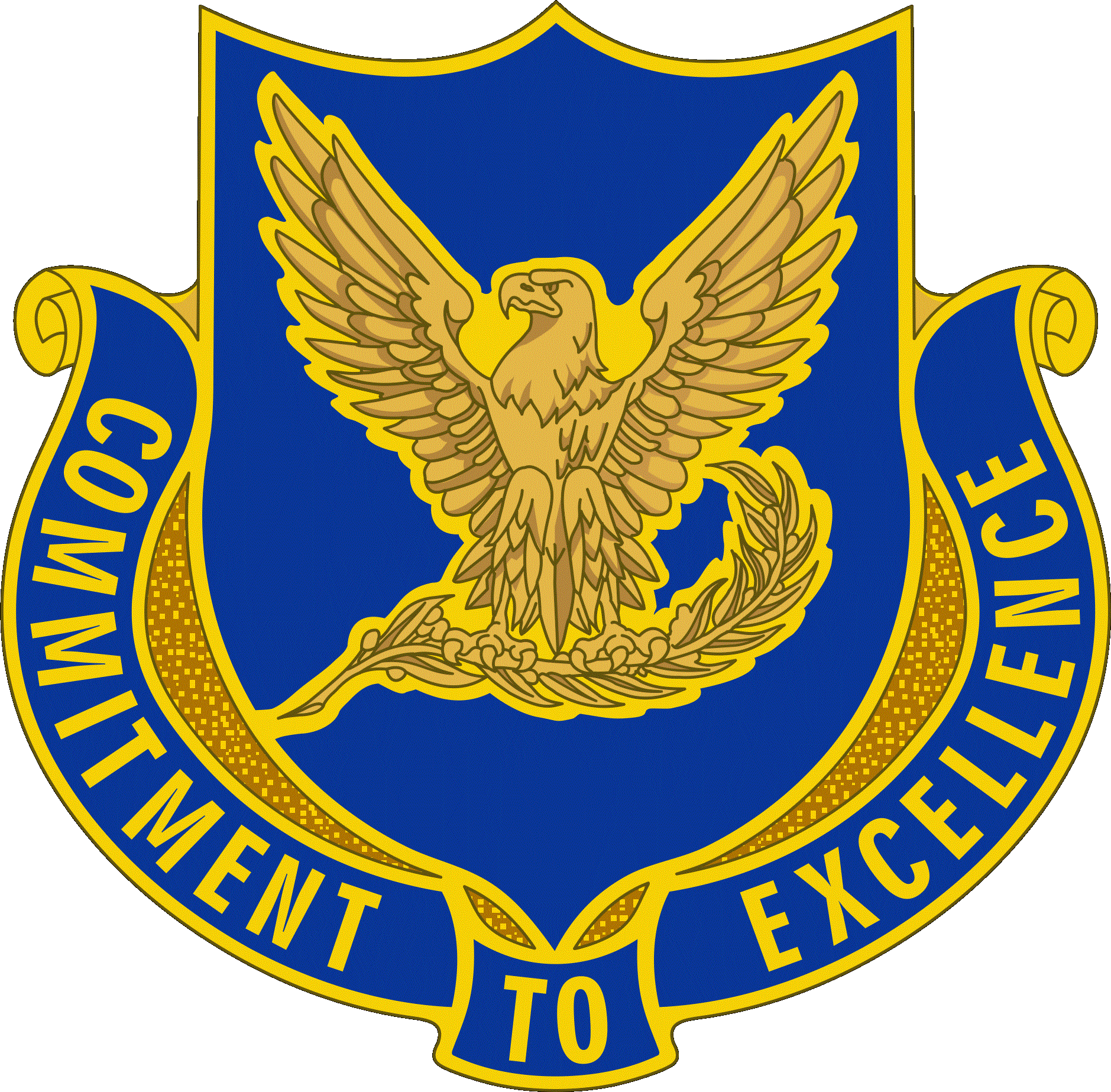
- Active: 2005 - present
- Country: United States
- Branch: United States Army
- Type: Aviation
- Garrison/HQ: Peoria, Illinois

The 106th Aviation Regiment is an aviation regiment of the United States Army.

The regiment was constituted 1 October 1986 in the Delaware and Illinois Army National Guard as the 44th Aviation Battalion; concurrently organized from new and existing units with headquarters at Peoria, Illinois.

Reorganized and redesignated 1 October 1987 in the Delaware, Illinois, and Michigan Army National Guard as the 106th Aviation, a parent regiment under the United States Army Regimental System, to consist of the 1st Battalion and Company E.

Reorganized 1 September 1990 in the Illinois and Michigan Army National Guard

Reorganized 24 June 1991 in the Illinois, Michigan, and Washington Army National Guard

Reorganized 1 September 1 995 in the Illinois, Iowa, and Michigan Army National Guard to consist of the 1st Battalion and Companies E and F. Reorganized 1 September 1 996 in the Illinois, Iowa, Michigan, and Puerto Rico Army National Guard to consist of the 1st Battalion and Companies E and F

(Company F ordered into active Federal service 3 February 2003 at Peoria; released from active Federal service 11 October 2004 and reverted to state control)

== Structure ==
- 1st Battalion (Assault Helicopter) (UH-60V) (IL ARNG)
  - Headquarters and Headquarters Company (IL ARNG)
  - Company A at Decatur (IL ARNG)
  - Company B at Kankakee (IL ARNG)
  - Company C at Marietta (GA ARNG)
  - Company D
    - Detachment ? at Decatur (IL ARNG)
  - Company E
    - Detachment ? at Peoria (IL ARNG)
