= 202nd Air Defense Artillery Regiment =

202nd Air Defense Artillery
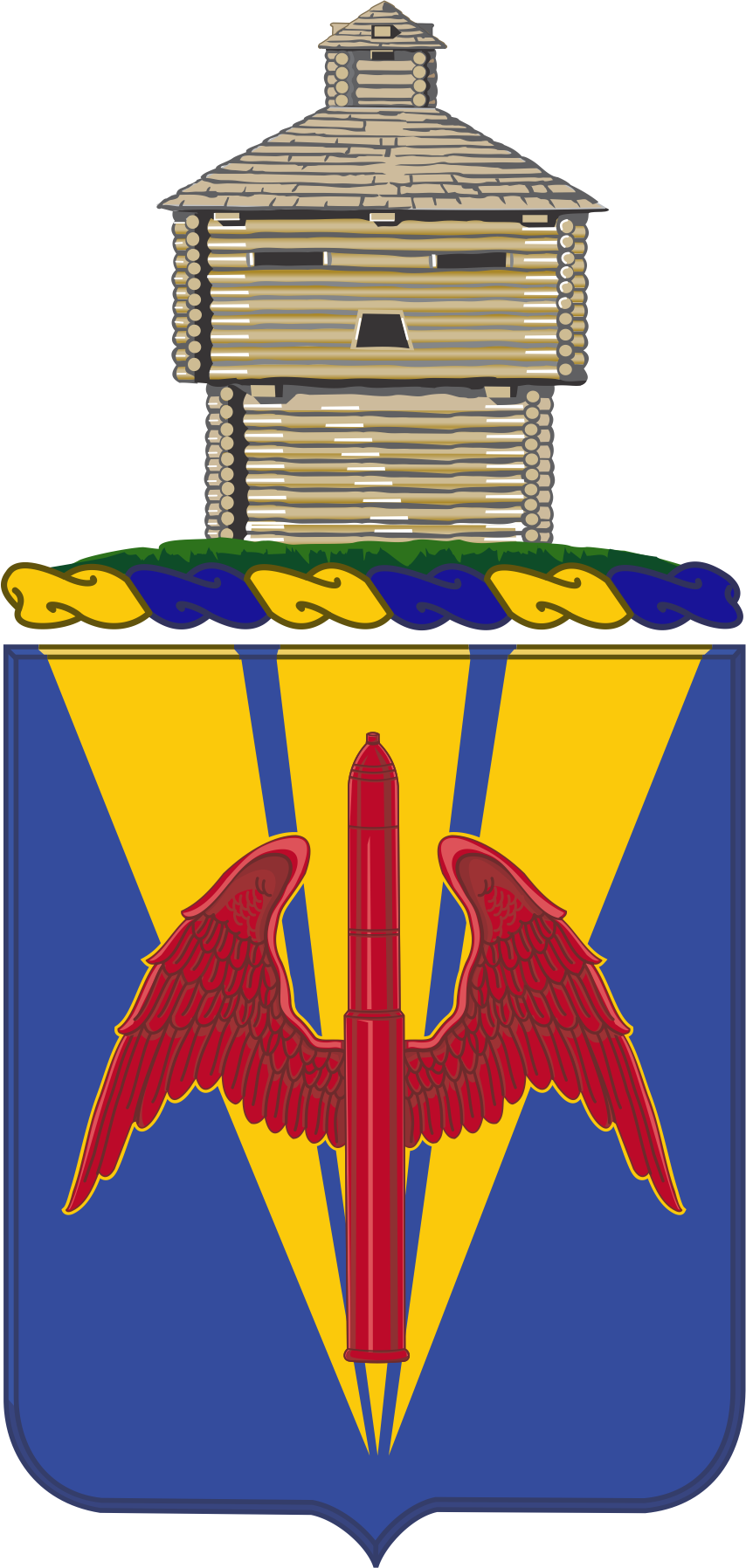
- Coat of arms
- Active: 1924
- Country: United States
- Allegiance: Illinois
- Branch: Illinois Army National Guard
- Type: Antiaircraft
- Motto: "Arte et Armis" (Art of Arms)
- Mascot: Oozlefinch

The 202nd Air Defense Artillery was an antiaircraft regiment of the Illinois Army National Guard.

== History ==
On 19 March 1921, the 6th Illinois Infantry was converted to the 1st Artillery (Antiaircraft), Coast Artillery Corps.

On 13 December 1921, redesignated as Provisional Battalion, 202nd Artillery (Antiaircraft) with six companies. redesignated to the 202nd Artillery Regiment (Antiaircraft), Coast Artillery Corps and on 26 August 1924, again, to the 202nd Coast Artillery Regiment(Antiaircraft)(Mobile).

- mustered into federal service on 16 September 1940 in Chicago. Arrived at Fort Bliss on September 20–21, 1940.
- 3rd Battalion Activated 15 June 1942 at Bremerton, Washington.

On 10 September 1943, the 202nd Coast Artillery Regiment was broken up and re-designated as follows-

- HQ & HQ Battery became HHB, 202nd Antiaircraft Artillery Group
- 1st Battalion became 768th Antiaircraft Artillery Gun Battalion
- 2nd Battalion became 396th Antiaircraft Artillery Automatic Weapons Battalion
- 3rd Battalion became the 242nd Antiaircraft Artillery Searchlight Battalion
- On 27 February 1958, the 768th, which had not undergone any re-designations, consolidated with the 698th, the name remained the 698th Missile Battalion. This was the final consolidation, which brought all the colors and honors of the old 202nd Coast Artillery (Regiment)(Antiaircraft)(Semi-mobile) together under the command of the 202nd Antiaircraft Artillery Group in Chicago.
- The 396th AAA Automatic Weapons Battalion, meanwhile, became the 693rd AAA Automatic Weapons Battalion, in Chicago on 13 December 1946, Then on 12 May 1949, it was again re-designated. This time it became the 133rd AAA Automatic Weapons Battalion. On 28 February 1954, the 133rd and the 698th AAA Battalions were consolidated and re-designated the 698th Antiaircraft Artillery Battalion. Four years later, the battalion was modernized and re-designated a missile battalion.
- The 242nd was inactivated and disbanded in June 1944 at Camp Van Dorn Mississippi. Two years later, it was reorganized as the 698th Antiaircraft Artillery Gun Battalion. On 1 May 1951, it was ordered to active duty in Chicago to release Active Army units and to train the National Guard personnel for overseas duties during the Korean hostilities. The main portion of the battalion was assigned to the Air Defense of Detroit, Michigan until the 698th Battalion was released from active service on 31 January 1953 and reverted to Illinois State control.

In January 1957, HQ & HQ Btry, A, B, and D Batteries, 698th Missile Battalion assumed an active role in the Air Defense of Chicago by taking over two Active Army gun sites on the north side of Chicago. C Battery joined the other three firing batteries, under the operational control of the 45th Air Defense Artillery Brigade, two months later.

- The 248th Missile Battalion consolidated on 1 March 1959 with the 698th Missile Battalion and the consolidated unit was reorganized and redesignated as the 202d Artillery, a parent regiment under the Combat Arms Regimental System, to consist of the 1st and 2d Missile Battalions. It consolidated on 1 April 1963 with Headquarters and Headquarters Battery, 202d Artillery Group, and the consolidated unit was designated as the 202d Artillery. It reorganized on 8 October 1963 to consist of the 1st Missile Battalion; on 1 January 1966 to consist of the 1st Battalion; and was redesignated on 1 April 1972 as the 202d Air Defense Artillery. Its Federal recognition was withdrawn on 30 September 1974.
- reconstituted on 26 October 1994 in the Illinois Army National Guard and consolidated with the 202d Air Defense Artillery; the consolidated unit was designated as the 202d Air Defense Artillery to consist of the 1st Battalion, an element of the 34th Infantry Division (United States), and the 2d Battalion.
- Batteries E and F, 1st Battalion, 202nd Air Defense Artillery, were respectively assigned during the 1990s to the 45th Infantry Brigade and the 39th Infantry Brigade. Soldiers from the 1st Battalion, 202nd Air Defense Artillery, deployed to Iceland to take part in the 2001 Northern Viking exercise. In 2006, the 202nd Air Defense Artillery Regiment was converted into the 106th Cavalry Regiment.

== Distinctive unit insignia ==
- Description

A Gold color metal and enamel device 1 1/4 inches (3.2 cm) in height overall consisting of a shield and crest blazoned: (Shield) Azure, three piles in point Or, overall a winged projectile palewise wings displayed Gules, that portion on the field fimbriated of the second. Attached below the shield a scroll inscribed “ARTE ET ARMIS” in Blue letters. (Crest) On a wreath Or and Azure, upon a grassy field the blockhouse of old Fort Dearborn of the first.

- Symbolism

The shield is blue to indicate the infantry origin of the regiment; the three piles represent the rays of the Artillery searchlights; the winged projectile is scarlet for Artillery; and the wings indicate the antiaircraft aspect of the parent organization. The motto translates to “By Skill and Arms.”

- Background

The distinctive unit insignia was originally approved for the 202d Coast Artillery on 31 October 1925. It was redesignated for the 768th Antiaircraft Artillery Gun Battalion on 31 July 1951. It was redesignated for the 768th Antiaircraft Artillery Battalion on 19 February 1957. The insignia was redesignated for the 202d Artillery Regiment on 6 January 1961. It was redesignated for the 202d Air Defense Artillery Regiment on 6 July 1972. The insignia was amended to revise the description and symbolism on 21 September 1989.

== Coat of arms ==
- Blazon
  - Shield: Azure, three piles in point Or, overall a winged projectile palewise wings displayed Gules, that portion on the field fimbriated of the second.
  - Crest: That for the regiments and separate battalions of the Illinois Army National Guard: On a wreath Or and Azure, upon a grassy field the blockhouse of old Fort Dearborn Proper. Motto ARTE ET ARMIS (By Skill and Arms).
- Symbolism
  - Shield: The shield is blue to indicate the infantry origin of the regiment; the three piles represent the rays of the Artillery searchlights; the winged projectile is scarlet for Artillery; and the wings indicate the antiaircraft aspect of the parent organization.
  - Crest: The crest is that of the Illinois Army National Guard.
- Background: The coat of arms was originally approved for the 202d Coast Artillery on 31 October 1925. It was redesignated for the 768th Antiaircraft Artillery Gun Battalion on 31 July 1951. It was redesignated for the 768th Antiaircraft Artillery Battalion on 19 February 1957. The insignia was redesignated for the 202d Artillery Regiment on 6 January 1961. It was redesignated for the 202d Air Defense Artillery Regiment on 6 July 1972. The insignia was amended to revise the symbolism on 21 September 1989.
