= Flight 202 =

Flight 202 may refer to:

- Pan Am Flight 202, a Boeing 377 Stratocruiser which crashed in the Amazon Basin on 28 April 1952
- Ariana Afghan Airlines Flight 202, a Douglas DC-4 which crashed in Lebanon on 21 November 1959
- Airblue Flight 202, an Airbus A321 which crashed in Pakistan on 28 July 2010
- Emirates Flight 202, onboard which the man responsible for the 2010 Times Square car bombing attempt attempted, but failed, to leave the United States. He was arrested moments before the aircraft left the gate at John F. Kennedy International Airport
