= 202nd Division =

202nd Division or 202nd Infantry Division may refer to:

- 202nd Division (People's Republic of China), 1949–1985
- 202nd Coastal Division, Italy
- 202nd Division (Imperial Japanese Army)
- 202nd Rifle Division, Soviet Union

== See also ==
- List of military divisions by number
- 202nd Brigade (disambiguation)
- 202nd Regiment (disambiguation)
- 202nd (disambiguation)
