= 218th Maneuver Enhancement Brigade =

US National Guard unit

- Shoulder sleeve insignia
- Active: 22 July 1807–24 December 1846 (Washington Light Infantry); 29 June 1846–29 June 1848 (Palmetto Regiment); 1903–1 April 1915 (Brookland Guards, 2nd Inf., SC State Militia); 1 April 1915–15 January 1946 (various designations); 21 February 1947–4 January 1974 (2nd Bge., 30th Inf. Div.); 4 January 1974–1 September 2008 (218th Infantry Bge. Mech.); 1 September 2008–present (218th MEB)
- Country: United States
- Branch: United States Army National Guard
- Type: Maneuver Enhancement
- Size: Brigade
- Part of: South Carolina Army National Guard
- Garrison/HQ: Charleston, South Carolina
- Motto: "Steadfast of Purpose
- Engagements: Mexican–American War; Spanish-American War; World War I; St. Mihiel; Meuse-Argonne; Lorraine 1918; World War II; Tunisia; Sicily with arrowhead; Rome-Arno; Southern France with arrowhead; Northern France; Rhineland; Global War on Terrorism; Afghanistan; Iraq; Armed Forces Expeditionary Force; Kosovo Defense Campaign; Bosnia-Herzegovina

Commanders
- Current commander: Colonel Kenneth Snow

Insignia
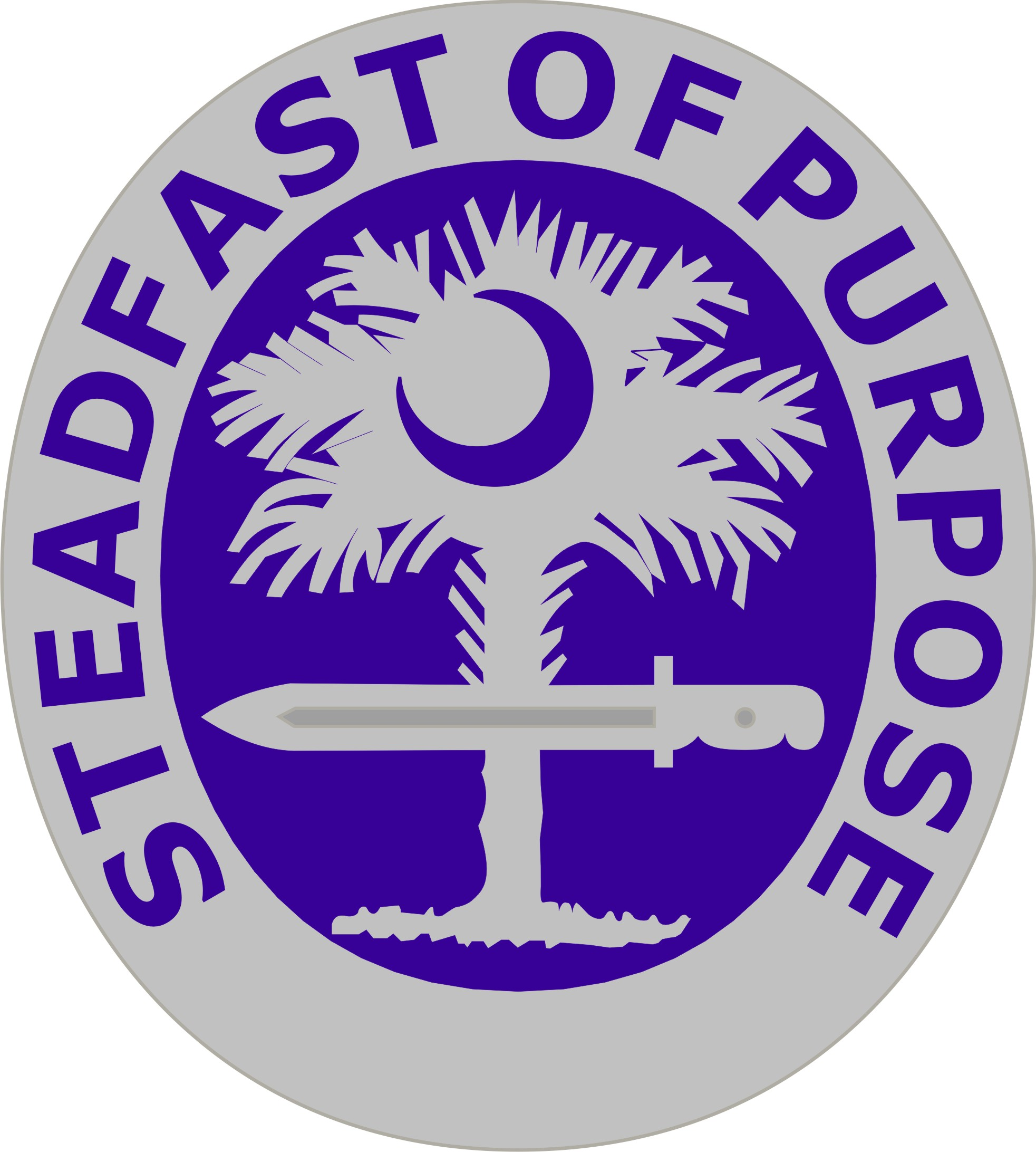
- 218th Maneuver Enhancement Brigade DUI

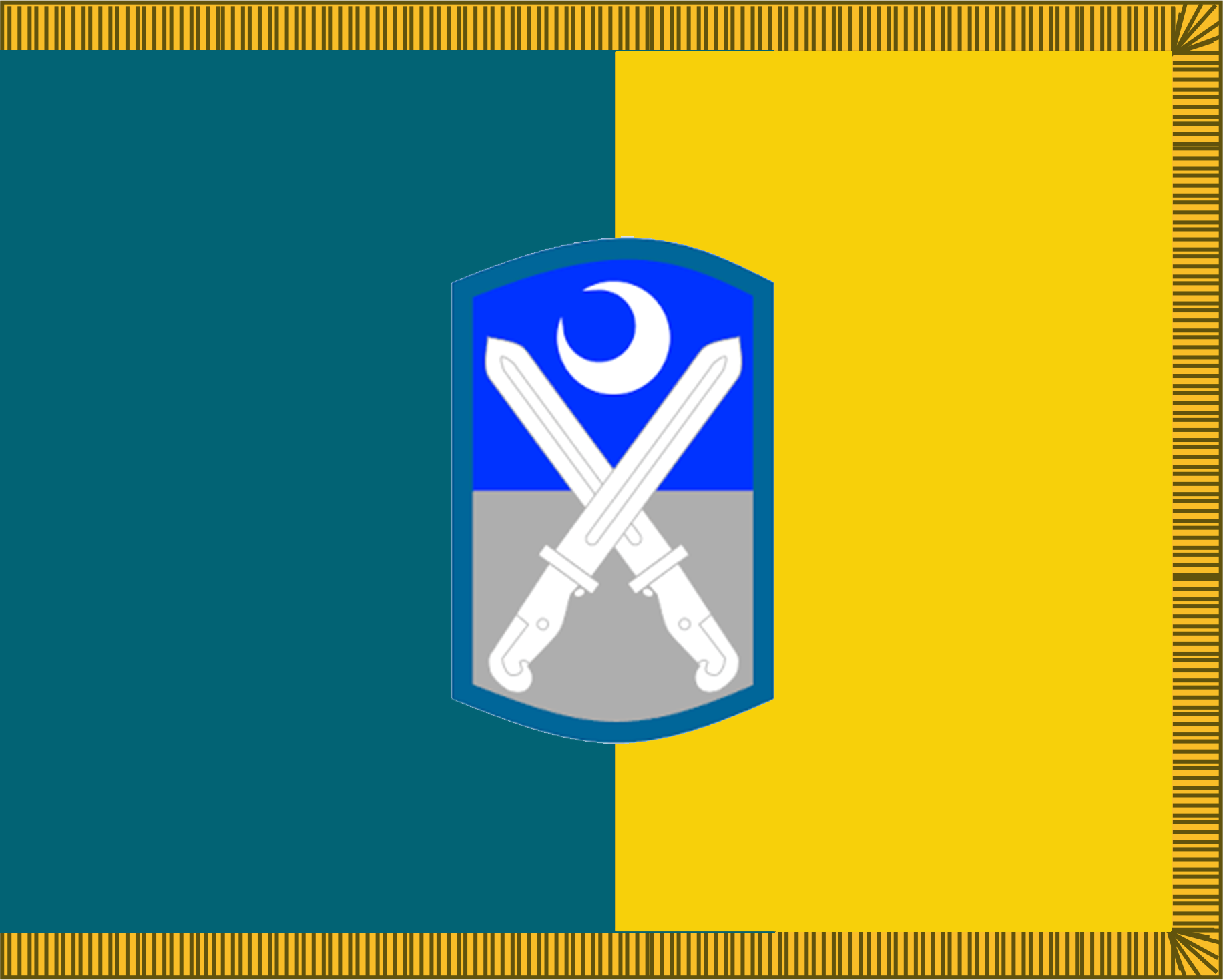
- 218th Maneuver Enhancement Brigade Flag

The 218th Maneuver Enhancement Brigade (218th MEB) is a rear area maneuver enhancement brigade of the South Carolina Army National Guard, headquartered at Charleston. It derives its history from the previous 218th Infantry Brigade (Mechanized) (Separate), originally formed from the 2nd Brigade of the former 30th Infantry Division on 1 January 1974. On 1 September 2008, the Headquarters and Headquarters Detachment of the 105th Signal Battalion became the Headquarters and Headquarters Company (HHC) of the 218th MEB. On 1 March 2009, the HHC of the 218th Infantry Brigade was consolidated with the HHC of the 218th MEB, becoming the 218th MEB.

== Organization ==
- 218th Maneuver Enhancement Brigade, in Charleston
  - Headquarters Support Company, 218th Maneuver Enhancement Brigade, in Charleston
  - 108th Chemical Company, at Joint Base Charleston
  - 111th Signal Company, in Charleston
  - 1st Battalion, 118th Infantry Regiment, in Mount Pleasant (part of 37th Infantry Brigade Combat Team)
    - Headquarters and Headquarters Company, 1st Battalion, 118th Infantry Regiment, in Mount Pleasant
      - Detachment 1, Headquarters and Headquarters Battery, 1st Battalion, 134th Field Artillery Regiment, in Eastover
    - Company A, 1st Battalion, 118th Infantry Regiment, in Moncks Corner
    - Company B, 1st Battalion, 118th Infantry Regiment, at Joint Base Charleston
    - Company C, 1st Battalion, 118th Infantry Regiment, in Mullins
    - Company D (Weapons), 1st Battalion, 118th Infantry Regiment, in Marion
    - Company I (Forward Support), 237th Brigade Support Battalion, at Joint Base Charleston
  - 4th Battalion, 118th Infantry Regiment, in Union (part of 30th Armored Brigade Combat Team)
    - Headquarters and Headquarters Company, 4th Battalion, 118th Infantry Regiment, in Union
    - Company A (Tank), 4th Battalion, 118th Infantry Regiment, in Dillon
    - Company B (Tank), 4th Battalion, 118th Infantry Regiment, in Gaffney
    - Company C (Mechanized Infantry), 4th Battalion, 118th Infantry Regiment, in Fountain Inn
    - Company H (Forward Support), 230th Brigade Support Battalion, in Greer

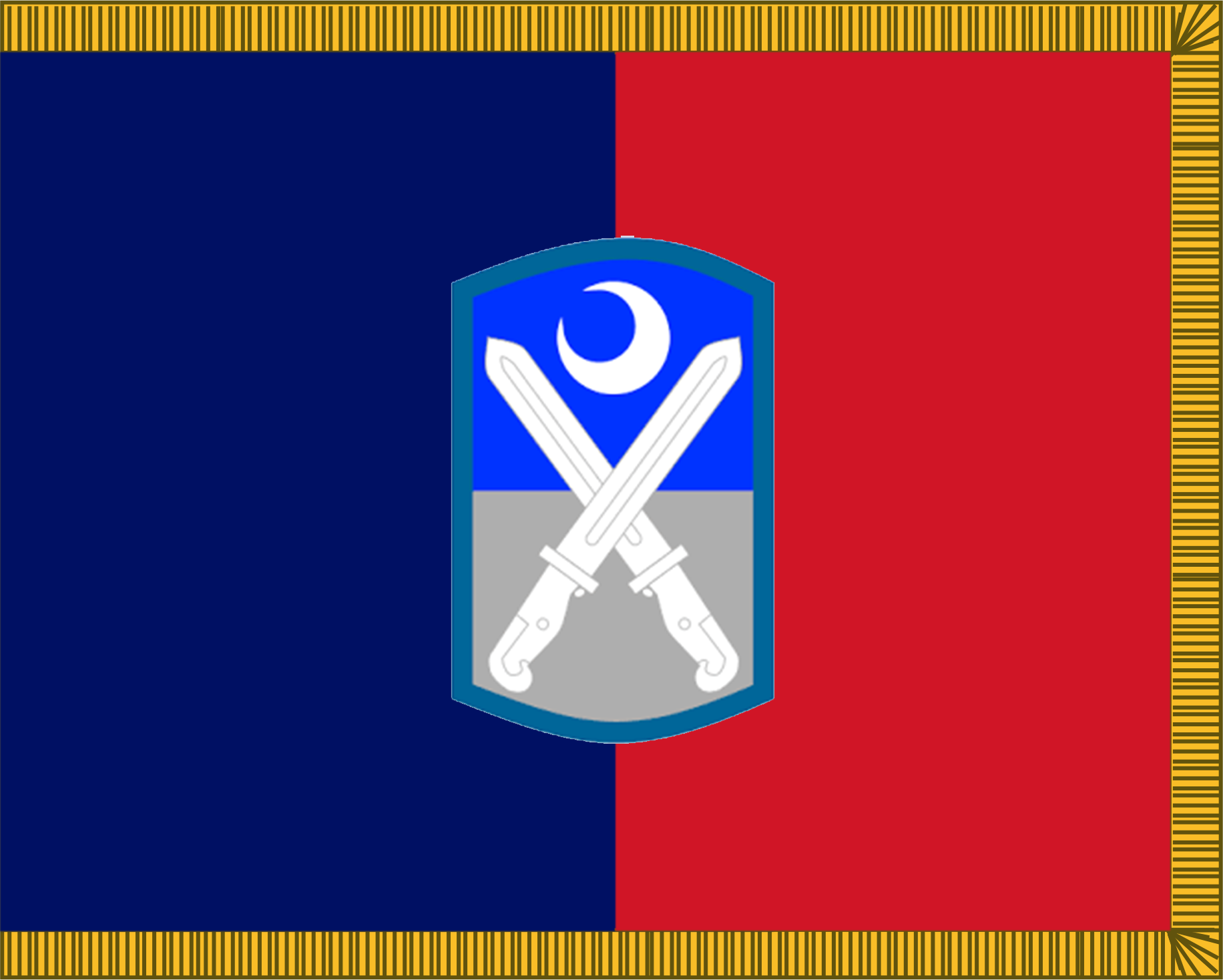
218th Infantry Brigade Flag

== Notable members ==
- Michael Haley, husband of US Presidential candidate Nikki Haley (on deployment to the Horn of Africa in 2023–2024)
