= 202nd =

202nd may refer to:

- 202nd (Sportsman's) Battalion, CEF, a unit in the Canadian Expeditionary Force during WWI
- 202nd Division (Imperial Japanese Army), an infantry division in the Imperial Japanese Army
- 202nd NBC Defense Battalion (Romania), a Nuclear, Biological and Chemical protection unit of the Romanian Land Forces
- 202nd Weather Flight, an Air National Guard (ANG) weather flight that provides meteorological and atmospheric forecasting
- 202nd (2/1st Kent) Brigade, a Territorial Force Brigade of the British Army in World War I

== See also ==
- 202 (number)
- 202, the year 202 (CCII) of the Julian calendar
