= Illinois Army National Guard =

Component of the US Army and military of the state of Illinois

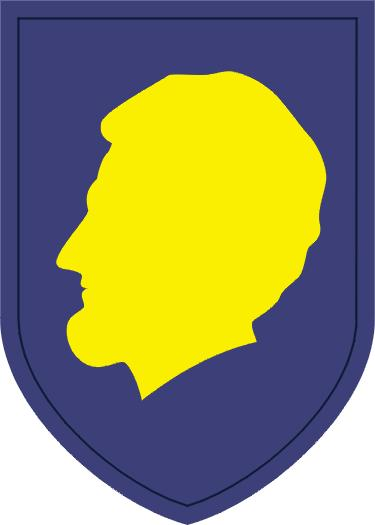
- Shoulder sleeve insignia of the Illinois Joint Force Headquarters
- Active: 1873/1903–present
- Country: United States
- Allegiance: Illinois
- Branch: United States Army National Guard
- Type: ARNG Headquarters Command
- Part of: Illinois National Guard
- Garrison/HQ: Camp Lincoln, Springfield, Illinois
- Mottos: Always Ready, Always There
- Website: https://www.il.ngb.army.mil/

Commanders
- Commander-in-Chief: President Donald Trump
- Secretary of Defense: Pete Hegseth
- Secretary of the Army: Daniel P. Driscoll
- Chief of the National Guard Bureau: Gen Steven S. Nordhaus, USAF
- Governor of Illinois: Gov JB Pritzker
- Adjutant General: MG Rodney Boyd
- Senior Enlisted Leader: CSM Kehinde Salami

Insignia
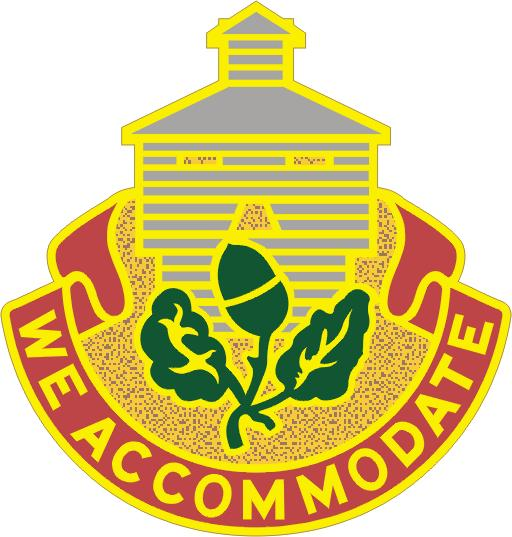
- Distinctive Unit Insignia

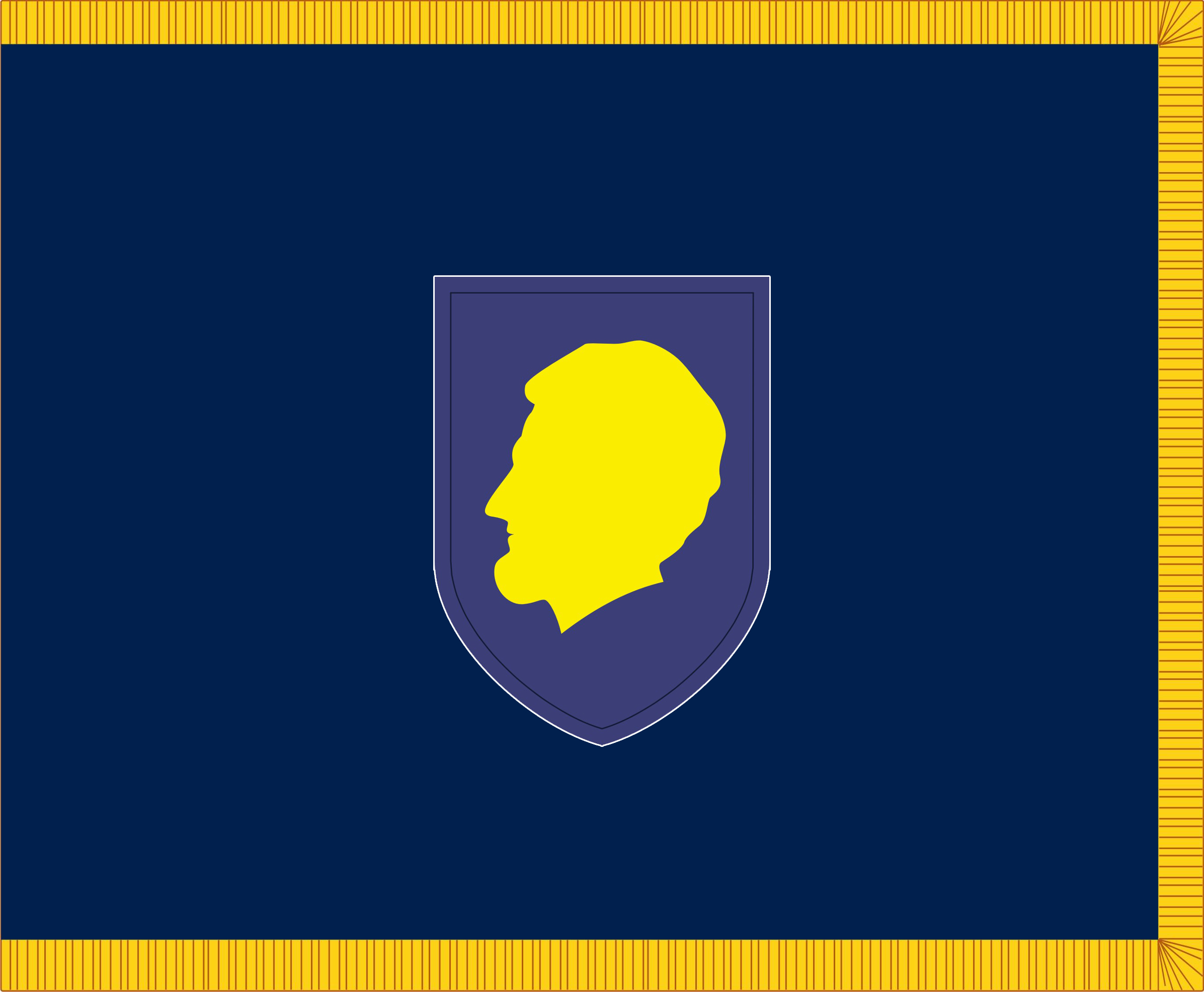
- Illinois ARNG Headquarters Flag

- Illinois ARNG Crest

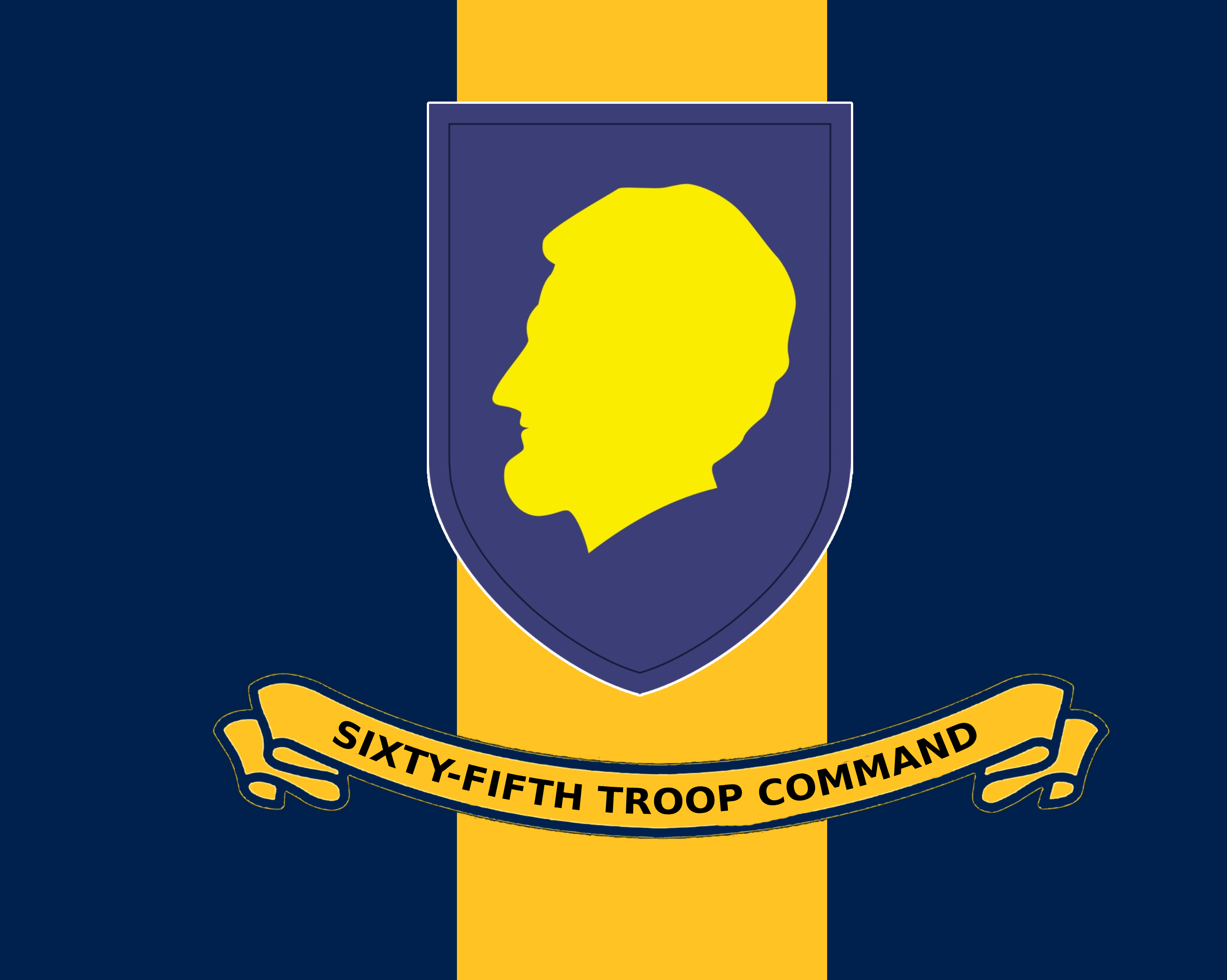
- Illinois ARNG 65th Troop Command Flag

The Illinois Army National Guard is a component of the United States Army and the United States National Guard. With the Illinois Air National Guard it forms the Illinois National Guard. National coordination of various state National Guard units are maintained through the National Guard Bureau. The Illinois Army National Guard is composed of approximately 10,000 soldiers.

Illinois Army National Guard units are trained and equipped as part of the United States Army. The same ranks and insignia are used. National Guardsmen are eligible to receive all United States military awards. The Illinois Guard also bestows a number of state awards for local services rendered in or to the state of Illinois.

== History ==
The Illinois Army National Guard was originally formed in 1712 as a colonial French militia. The militia worked under British sovereignty in the mid-eighteenth century, until the American Revolutionary War, when in 1779 Colonel George Rogers Clark, with 200 frontiersmen, of the Illinois Regiment, Virginia State Forces, from Kaskaskia, captured Fort Sackville from British Colonel Henry Hamilton and his military forces. A small force of Illinois militia later, captured Prairie du Chien. Following the American Civil War, the state forces were reorganized under the command of Arthur C. Ducat, who became the first major general of the statewide Illinois militia.

The Militia Act of 1903 organized the various state militias into the present National Guard system. The 44th Infantry Division was part of the IL ARNG from 1945/46. It was inducted into Federal Service during the Korean War but on its release the governor of Illinois declined to support it, citing budgetary considerations. It was thus deactivated on its release from Federal Service in December 1954. From that time, Illinois ARNG units have formed part of the 33rd Infantry Division, and then the 47th Infantry Division until November 1991.

On 1 October 1986, the 44th Aviation Battalion was constituted in the Delaware and Illinois Army National Guard. It was concurrently organized from new and existing units with Headquarters at Peoria, Illinois.

In November 1991 the 66th Infantry Brigade was reassigned to the 34th Infantry Division. Later it was reassigned again to the 35th Infantry Division.

For much of the final decades of the twentieth century, National Guard personnel typically served "One weekend a month, two weeks a year", with a portion working for the Guard in a full-time capacity. Around 2006, the forces formation plans of the US Army call for the typical National Guard unit (or National Guardsman) to serve one year of active duty for every three years of service. More specifically, United States Department of Defense policy was that no Guardsman will be involuntarily activated for a total of more than 24 months (cumulative) in one six-year enlistment period. This policy was due to change on August 1, 2007, with the new policy states that soldiers will be given 24 months between deployments of no more than 24 months. However, individual states have differing policies.

The 33rd Inf Bde Combat Team served in Afghanistan in 2008–09.

- Activated: August 21, 2008 (National Guard brigade from Illinois).
- Overseas: September 2008.
- Campaigns: Afghanistan (OEF)
- Presidential Unit Citation: 1.
- Returned Home August 21, 2009

== Historic units ==
Regiments that have served with the IL ARNG since 1917 include:

106th Cavalry Regiment (106th CR)	123rd Infantry Regiment (123rd IR)	129th Infantry Regiment (129th IR)	130th Infantry Regiment (130th IR)
131st Infantry Regiment (131st IR)	132nd Infantry Regiment (132nd IR)	178th Infantry Regiment (133rd IR)	122nd Field Artillery Regiment (122nd FAR)
123rd Field Artillery Regiment (123rd FAR)	124th Field Artillery Battalion (124th FAB)	184th Field Artillery Regiment (184th FAR)	208th Field Artillery Regiment (208th FAR)
210th Field Artillery Regiment (210th FAR)	223rd Field Artillery Regiment (223rd FAR)	233rd Field Artillery Regiment (233rd FAR)	202nd Coast Artillery (202nd CA) (AA)

== Organization ==
As of February 2026 the Illinois Army National Guard consists of the following units:

- Joint Force Headquarters-Illinois, Army Element, in Springfield
  - Headquarters and Headquarters Detachment, Joint Force Headquarters-Illinois, Army Element, in Springfield
  - Illinois Recruiting & Retention Battalion, in Springfield
    - Company B, in Chicago
    - Company C, in Rock Falls
    - Company D, in Aurora
    - Company F, in Crestwood
    - Company G, in Marseilles
    - Company H, in Woodstock
    - Company I, in Galesburg
    - Company K, in Springfield
    - Company L, in Mattoon
    - Company M, in Shiloh
    - Company W, in Marion
  - Illinois Medical Detachment, in Springfield
    - Detachment 2, Illinois Medical Detachment, in Kankakee
    - Detachment 3, Illinois Medical Detachment, in Mount Vernon
  - 412th Judge Advocate General Trial Defense Team, in Springfield
  - 416th Judge Advocate General Trial Defense Team, in Springfield
  - 1965th Support Detachment (Contracting Team), in Springfield
  - Detachment 5, Company A, 2nd Battalion (Fixed Wing), 245th Aviation Regiment (Detachment 36, Operational Support Airlift Activity), at Capital Airport Air National Guard Station (C-12 Huron)
  - Training Area, in Sparta
  - Training Area, in Marseilles
  - Army Aviation Support Facility #1, at Decatur Airport
  - Army Aviation Support Facility #2, at Greater Kankakee Airport
  - Army Aviation Support Facility #3, at Peoria Air National Guard Base
  - Combined Support Maintenance Shop #1, in Springfield
  - Combined Support Maintenance Shop #2, in North Riverside
  - Field Maintenance Shop #2, in Crestwood
  - Field Maintenance Shop #4, in Decatur
  - Field Maintenance Shop #5, in Mattoon
  - Field Maintenance Shop #6, in Peoria
  - Field Maintenance Shop #7, in Kewanee
  - Field Maintenance Shop #8, in Sparta
  - Field Maintenance Shop #10, in Paris
  - Field Maintenance Shop #11, in Rock Falls
  - Field Maintenance Shop #12, in Joliet
  - Field Maintenance Shop #13, in Machesney Park
  - Field Maintenance Shop #15, in East St. Louis
  - Field Maintenance Shop #16, in Bloomington
  - Field Maintenance Shop #18, in Marion
  - Field Maintenance Shop #19, in Milan
  - Field Maintenance Shop #21, in Macomb
  - Unit Training Equipment Site #1, in Marseilles
  - 33rd Infantry Brigade Combat Team, in Urbana (part of 38th Infantry Division)
    - Headquarters and Headquarters Company, 33rd Infantry Brigade Combat Team, in Urbana
    - 2nd Squadron, 106th Cavalry Regiment, in Kewanee
      - Headquarters and Headquarters Troop, 2nd Squadron, 106th Cavalry Regiment, in Kewanee
      - Troop A, 2nd Squadron, 106th Cavalry Regiment, in Pontiac
      - Troop B, 2nd Squadron, 106th Cavalry Regiment, in Dixon
      - Troop C (Dismounted), 2nd Squadron, 106th Cavalry Regiment, in Aurora
    - 2nd Battalion, 130th Infantry Regiment, in Marion
      - Headquarters and Headquarters Company, 2nd Battalion, 130th Infantry Regiment, in Marion
      - Company A, 2nd Battalion, 130th Infantry Regiment, in Marion
      - Company B, 2nd Battalion, 130th Infantry Regiment, in Effingham
      - Company C, 2nd Battalion, 130th Infantry Regiment, in Litchfield
      - Company D (Weapons), 2nd Battalion, 130th Infantry Regiment, in Mount Vernon
    - 1st Battalion, 178th Infantry Regiment, in Chicago
      - Headquarters and Headquarters Company, 1st Battalion, 178th Infantry Regiment, in Chicago
      - Company A, 1st Battalion, 178th Infantry Regiment, in Bartonville
      - Company B, 1st Battalion, 178th Infantry Regiment, in Elgin
      - Company C, 1st Battalion, 178th Infantry Regiment, in Kankakee
      - Company D (Weapons), 1st Battalion, 178th Infantry Regiment, in Woodstock
    - 1st Battalion, 296th Infantry Regiment, in Mayagüez (PR) — (Puerto Rico Army National Guard)
    - 2nd Battalion, 122nd Field Artillery Regiment, in Chicago
      - Headquarters and Headquarters Battery 2nd Battalion, 122nd Field Artillery Regiment, in Chicago
        - Detachment 1, Headquarters and Headquarters Battery, 2nd Battalion, 122nd Field Artillery Regiment, in Chicago (supports 1st Battalion, 178th Infantry Regiment)
        - Detachment 2, Headquarters and Headquarters Battery, 2nd Battalion, 122nd Field Artillery Regiment, in Urbana (supports 33rd Infantry Brigade Combat Team)
        - Detachment 3, Headquarters and Headquarters Battery, 2nd Battalion, 122nd Field Artillery Regiment, in Marion (supports 2nd Battalion, 130th Infantry Regiment)
        - Detachment 4, Headquarters and Headquarters Battery, 2nd Battalion, 122nd Field Artillery Regiment, in Kewanee (supports 2nd Squadron, 106th Cavalry Regiment)
      - Battery A, 2nd Battalion, 122nd Field Artillery Regiment, in Sycamore (M119A3)
      - Battery B, 2nd Battalion, 122nd Field Artillery Regiment, at Crestwood (M119A3)
      - Battery C, 2nd Battalion, 122nd Field Artillery Regiment, in Chicago (M777A2)
    - 766th Brigade Engineer Battalion, in Decatur
      - Headquarters and Headquarters Company, 766th Brigade Engineer Battalion, in Decatur
      - Company A (Combat Engineer), 766th Brigade Engineer Battalion, in Marseilles
      - Company B (Combat Engineer), 766th Brigade Engineer Battalion, in Marseilles
      - Company C (Signal), 766th Brigade Engineer Battalion, in Urbana
      - Company D (Military Intelligence), 766th Brigade Engineer Battalion, in Bloomington
        - Detachment 1, Company D (Military Intelligence), 766th Brigade Engineer Battalion, at Peoria Air National Guard Base (RQ-28A UAV)
    - 634th Brigade Support Battalion, in Sullivan
      - Headquarters and Headquarters Company, 634th Brigade Support Battalion, in Sullivan
      - Company A (Distribution), 634th Brigade Support Battalion, in Mattoon
      - Company B (Maintenance), 634th Brigade Support Battalion, in Urbana
      - Company C (Medical), 634th Brigade Support Battalion, in Springfield
      - Company D (Forward Support), 634th Brigade Support Battalion, in Galva — attached to 2nd Squadron, 106th Cavalry Regiment
      - Company E (Forward Support), 634th Brigade Support Battalion, in Decatur — attached to 766th Brigade Engineer Battalion
      - Company F (Forward Support), 634th Brigade Support Battalion, in Crestwood — attached to 2nd Battalion, 122nd Field Artillery Regiment
      - Company G (Forward Support), 634th Brigade Support Battalion, in Joliet — attached to 1st Battalion, 178th Infantry Regiment
      - Company H (Forward Support), 634th Brigade Support Battalion, in Mount Vernon — attached to 2nd Battalion, 130th Infantry Regiment
      - Company I (Forward Support), 634th Brigade Support Battalion, in Mayagüez (PR) — attached to 1st Battalion, 296th Infantry Regiment (Puerto Rico Army National Guard)
  - 34th Division Sustainment Brigade, in Chicago (part of 34th Infantry Division)
    - 34th Division Sustainment Troops Battalion, in Chicago
      - Headquarters and Headquarters Company, 34th Division Sustainment Brigade, in Chicago
      - 433rd Signal Company, in Chicago
      - 633rd Adjutant General Detachment (Theater Gateway — Personnel Accountability Team), in Chicago
      - 1863rd Financial Management Support Detachment, in Chicago
    - 6th Battalion (Brigade Support), 54th Security Force Assistance Brigade, at Rock Island Arsenal
      - Headquarters Support Company, 6th Battalion (Brigade Support), 54th Security Force Assistance Brigade, at Rock Island Arsenal
      - Company A, 6th Battalion (Brigade Support), 54th Security Force Assistance Brigade, at Rock Island Arsenal
      - Company B, 6th Battalion (Brigade Support), 54th Security Force Assistance Brigade, at Rock Island Arsenal
    - 108th Medical Battalion (Multifunctional), in North Riverside
      - Headquarters and Headquarters Detachment, 108th Medical Battalion (Multifunctional), in North Riverside
      - 708th Medical Company (Ground Ambulance), in North Riverside
      - 709th Medical Company (Area Support), in Bartonville
      - 710th Medical Company (Area Support), in Crestwood
    - 198th Combat Sustainment Support Battalion, in North Riverside
      - Headquarters and Headquarters Company, 198th Combat Sustainment Support Battalion, in North Riverside
      - 725th Transportation Company (Medium Truck) (POL, 5K GAL), in Machesney Park
      - 1244th Transportation Company (Medium Truck) (Cargo), in North Riverside
      - 1644th Transportation Company (Medium Truck) (Cargo), in Rock Falls
      - 1744th Transportation Company (Medium Truck) (Cargo), in Crestwood
    - 232nd Combat Sustainment Support Battalion, in Springfield
      - Headquarters and Headquarters Company, 232nd Combat Sustainment Support Battalion, in Springfield
      - 126th Quartermaster Company (Field Service), in Quincy
      - 128th Quartermaster Platoon (Field Feeding), in North Riverside
        - Detachment 1, 128th Quartermaster Platoon (Field Feeding), in Crestwood
        - Detachment 2, 128th Quartermaster Platoon (Field Feeding), in Rock Falls
      - 733rd Quartermaster Platoon (Field Feeding), in Springfield
        - Detachment 1, 733rd Quartermaster Platoon (Field Feeding), in Bartonville
        - Detachment 2, 733rd Quartermaster Platoon (Field Feeding), in East St. Louis
        - Detachment 3, 733rd Quartermaster Platoon (Field Feeding), in Paris
      - 1544th Transportation Company (Light-Medium Truck), in Paris
        - Detachment 1, 1544th Transportation Company (Light-Medium Truck), in Danville
      - 1844th Transportation Company (Light-Medium Truck), in East St. Louis
      - 1970th Quartermaster Company (Water Purification and Distribution), in North Riverside
      - 3625th Ordnance Company (Classification and Inspection Company), in North Riverside
      - 3637th Ordnance Company (Support Maintenance), in Springfield
    - 1347th Division Sustainment Support Battalion, in Bloomington (MN) — (Minnesota Army National Guard)
  - 65th Troop Command, in Peoria
    - Headquarters and Headquarters Detachment, 65th Troop Command, in Peoria
    - 5th Civil Support Team (WMD), in Bartonville
    - 144th Army Band, in Peoria
    - 139th Mobile Public Affairs Detachment, in Chicago
    - Cyber Protection Team 176, in Bloomington
    - 234th Electronic Warfare Company, in Joliet
    - 244th Digital Liaison Detachment, in Chicago
    - Company C, 260th Military Intelligence Battalion (Linguist), in Chicago (part of 300th Military Intelligence Brigade (Linguist))
    - Company C, 341st Military Intelligence Battalion (Linguist), in Chicago (part of 300th Military Intelligence Brigade (Linguist))
    - 2nd Battalion, 123rd Field Artillery Regiment, in Milan (M777A2) (part of 45th Field Artillery Brigade)
      - Headquarters and Headquarters Battery, 2nd Battalion, 123rd Field Artillery Regiment, in Milan
      - Battery A, 2nd Battalion, 123rd Field Artillery Regiment, in Milan
      - Battery B, 2nd Battalion, 123rd Field Artillery Regiment, in Springfield
      - Battery C, 2nd Battalion, 123rd Field Artillery Regiment, in Galesburg
      - 2123rd Forward Support Company, in Milan
    - 217th Military Intelligence Battalion, in Forest Park
      - Headquarters and Headquarters Company, 217th Military Intelligence Battalion, in Chicago
      - Company A, 217th Military Intelligence Battalion, in Chicago
      - Company B, 217th Military Intelligence Battalion, in Chicago
      - Company C, 217th Military Intelligence Battalion, in Chicago
    - 1st Battalion (Assault), 106th Aviation Regiment, at Peoria Air National Guard Base
      - Headquarters and Headquarters Company, 1st Battalion (Assault), 106th Aviation Regiment, at Peoria Air National Guard Base
        - Detachment 1, Headquarters and Headquarters Company, 1st Battalion (Assault), 106th Aviation Regiment, at Barrow County Airport (GA) — (Georgia Army National Guard)
      - Company A, 1st Battalion (Assault), 106th Aviation Regiment, at Decatur Airport (UH-60M Black Hawk)
      - Company B, 1st Battalion (Assault), 106th Aviation Regiment, at Greater Kankakee Airport (UH-60M Black Hawk)
      - Company C, 1st Battalion (Assault), 106th Aviation Regiment, at Barrow County Airport (GA) (UH-60M Black Hawk) — (Georgia Army National Guard)
      - Company D (AVUM), 1st Battalion (Assault), 106th Aviation Regiment, at Decatur Airport
        - Detachment 1, Company D (AVUM), 1st Battalion (Assault), 106th Aviation Regiment, at Barrow County Airport (GA) — (Georgia Army National Guard)
      - Company E (Forward Support), 1st Battalion (Assault), 106th Aviation Regiment, at Peoria Air National Guard Base
        - Detachment 1, Company E (Forward Support), 1st Battalion (Assault), 106th Aviation Regiment, at Barrow County Airport (GA) — (Georgia Army National Guard)
      - Detachment 2, Company G (MEDEVAC), 1st Battalion (General Support Aviation), 111th Aviation Regiment, at Greater Kankakee Airport (HH-60M Black Hawk)
        - Detachment 7, Company D (AVUM), 1st Battalion (General Support Aviation), 111th Aviation Regiment], at Greater Kankakee Airport
        - Detachment 8, Company E (Forward Support), 1st Battalion (General Support Aviation), 111th Aviation Regiment, at Greater Kankakee Airport
      - Company B (Heavy Lift), 2nd Battalion (General Support Aviation), 238th Aviation Regiment, at Peoria Air National Guard Base (CH-47F Chinook)
        - Detachment 1, Headquarters and Headquarters Company, 2nd Battalion (General Support Aviation), 238th Aviation Regiment, at Peoria Air National Guard Base
        - Detachment 2, Company D (AVUM), 2nd Battalion (General Support Aviation), 238th Aviation Regiment, at Peoria Air National Guard Base
        - Detachment 2, Company E (Forward Support), 2nd Battalion (General Support Aviation), 238th Aviation Regiment, at Peoria Air National Guard Base
      - Detachment 1, Company B, 1st Battalion (Security & Support), 376th Aviation Regiment, at Decatur Airport (UH-72A Lakota)
      - Company B (AVIM), 935th Aviation Support Battalion, at Greater Kankakee Airport
        - Detachment 5, Company B (AVIM), 935th Aviation Support Battalion, at Peoria Air National Guard Base
  - 404th Maneuver Enhancement Brigade, in Normal
    - Headquarters Support Company, 404th Maneuver Enhancement Brigade, in Normal
    - 406th Brigade Signal Company (MEB/CAB/SB), in Bloomington
    - 33rd Military Police Battalion, in Machesney Park
      - Headquarters and Headquarters Detachment, 33rd Military Police Battalion, in Machesney Park
      - 233rd Military Police Company (Combat Support), in Springfield
      - 333rd Military Police Company (Combat Support), in Freeport
      - 933rd Military Police Company (Combat Support), in Fort Sheridan
    - 44th Chemical Battalion, in Bloomington
      - Headquarters and Headquarters Company, 44th Chemical Battalion, in Bloomington
      - 135th Chemical Company, in Machesney Park
      - 444th Chemical Company, in Galesburg
      - 445th Chemical Company, in Shiloh
      - 450th Chemical Detachment, in Bloomington
    - 123rd Engineer Battalion, in Murphysboro
      - Headquarters and Headquarters Company, 123rd Engineer Battalion, in Murphysboro
      - Forward Support Company, 123rd Engineer Battalion, in Murphysboro
      - 616th Engineer Detachment (Utilities), in Macomb
      - 631st Engineer Company (Engineer Support Company), in Sparta
      - 661st Engineer Company (Engineer Construction Company), in Macomb
      - 615th Engineer Detachment (Fire Fighting Team — HQ), in Sparta
      - 661st Engineer Detachment (Fire Fighting Team — Fire Truck), in Sparta
      - 662nd Engineer Detachment (Fire Fighting Team — Fire Truck), in Sparta
      - 1886th Engineer Detachment (Engineer Facility Detachment), in Springfield
      - 2118th Engineer Detachment (Asphalt), in Sparta
  - 129th Regiment, Regional Training Institute, in Springfield
    - 1st Battalion
    - 2nd Battalion

Aviation unit abbreviations: MEDEVAC — Medical evacuation; AVUM — Aviation Unit Maintenance; AVIM — Aviation Intermediate Maintenancef

== See also ==
- Illinois Reserve Militia
