= List of infantry battalions of the Army National Guard from 1959 =

This listing of infantry battalions of the Army National Guard from 1959 is organized by regiment.

The Pentomic reorganization of the United States Army in 1957 eliminated the infantry regiment as a combat unit, and was extended to units of the Army National Guard in 1959. To perpetuate unit heritage, infantry battle groups were assigned to a parent regiment under the Combat Arms Regimental System. Such parent regiments provided a basis for continuing military traditions despite frequent reorganizations. Unlike those of the Regular Army, the parent regiments of the Army National Guard perpetuate the military heritage associated with a specific geographical area in line with the roots of the National Guard in state militia forces. The lowest numbered or lettered active unit of the regiment retains custody of regimental colors, awards, and other memorabilia.

In 1989 and again in 1991, it was written that the Center for Military History was planning to publish Army Lineage Series: Infantry Part II: Army National Guard and Army Reserve.

== Infantry Regiments of the United States Army National Guard 1959–present ==
=== 1 to 100 ===
- 65th Infantry Regiment (Puerto Rico Army National Guard)
  - 1st Battle Group, 65th Infantry (1959–1964)
  - 1st Battalion, 65th Infantry (1964–present) – Part of the 92nd Infantry Brigade
  - Company E, 65th Infantry (1971–1980) – Ranger company
  - 2nd Battalion, 65th Infantry (1978–1992)
- 69th Infantry (New York Army National Guard) – Redesignated from 165th Infantry 1963 and converted to 69th Air Defense Artillery 1993, reverted to 69th Infantry 1996
  - 1st Battalion, 69th Infantry (1963–1993) – Part of the 42nd Infantry Division, reorganized as 1st Battalion, 69th Air Defense Artillery 1993
  - 1st Battalion, 69th Infantry (1996–present) – Reorganized from 1st Battalion, 69th Air Defense Artillery, part of the 42nd Infantry Division
  - 2nd Battalion, 69th Infantry (1963–1975) – Part of the 42nd Infantry Division
- 71st Infantry (New York Army National Guard)
  - 1st Battle Group, 71st Infantry (1959–1963)
  - 1st Battalion, 71st Infantry (1963–1992)
- 72nd Infantry (Vermont Army National Guard) – Redesignated as 172nd Infantry 1 April 1983
  - Company A, 72nd Infantry – Constituted 1 September 1982 as a specialized mountain warfare unit

=== 101 to 300 ===
- 101st Infantry (Massachusetts Army National Guard) – Consolidated into 182nd Infantry 1992
  - 1st Battle Group, 101st Infantry (1959–1963)
  - 1st Battalion, 101st Infantry (1963–1992)
- 102nd Infantry (Connecticut Army National Guard)
  - 1st Battle Group, 102nd Infantry (1959–1963)
  - 2nd Battle Group, 102nd Infantry (1959–1963)
  - 1st Battalion, 102nd Infantry (1963–present) – Reorganized from 1st Battle Group, 102nd Infantry 1963.
  - 2nd Battalion, 102nd Infantry (1963–1992) – Reorganized from 2nd Battle Group, 102nd Infantry 1963. Eliminated 1992.
  - 3rd Battalion, 102nd Infantry (1992) – Redesignated from 1st Battalion, 169th Infantry 1992 and eliminated in the same year.
- 104th Infantry (Massachusetts Army National Guard) – Consolidated into 181st Infantry 2006
  - 1st Battle Group, 104th Infantry (1959–1963)
  - 1st Battalion, 104th Infantry (1963–2006)
  - 2nd Battalion, 104th Infantry (1963–1992)
- 105th Infantry (New York Army National Guard) – Lineage continued by 501st Ordnance Battalion
  - 1st Armored Rifle Battalion, 105th Infantry (1959–1963) – Reorganized from 105th Armored Infantry Battalion, part of 27th Armored Division.
  - 1st Battalion, 105th Infantry (1963–1968) – Broken up when 27th Armored Division eliminated, elements became support units.
  - 1st Battalion, 105th Infantry (1975–2005) – HHC Schenectady, inactivated 2005 and converted to 501st Ordnance Battalion
  - 2nd Battalion, 105th Infantry (1983–1991) – HHC Troy. Eliminated 1991.
- 106th Infantry (New York Army National Guard)
  - 1st Battle Group, 106th Infantry (1959–1963)
  - 1st Battalion, 106th Infantry (1963–1983)
- 107th Infantry (New York Army National Guard)
  - 1st Battle Group, 107th Infantry (1959–1963)
  - 1st Battalion, 107th Infantry (1963–1991) – Eliminated 1991. Consolidated with HHC of 107th Brigade, 42nd Infantry Division to become 107th Support Group.
  - 2nd Battalion, 107th Infantry (1963–1968)
- 108th Infantry (New York Army National Guard)
  - 1st Armored Rifle Battalion, 108th Infantry (1959–1963)
  - 2nd Armored Rifle Battalion, 108th Infantry (1959–1963)
  - 1st Battalion, 108th Infantry (1963–2005)
  - 2nd Battalion, 108th Infantry (1963–1968)
  - 2nd Battalion, 108th Infantry (1971–present) – HQ Utica, part of the 27th Infantry Brigade Combat Team, has companies and detachments stationed in eight Upstate New York towns.
  - 3rd Battalion, 108th Infantry (1986–1996)
- 109th Infantry (Pennsylvania Army National Guard)
  - 1st Battle Group, 109th Infantry (1959–1963)
  - 1st Battalion, 109th Infantry (1963–present)
  - 2nd Battalion, 109th Infantry (1963–1992) – Converted to 2nd Battalion, 103rd Armor 1992.
  - 3rd Battalion, 109th Infantry (1964–1968)
  - 3rd Battalion, 109th Infantry (1975–1995) – Converted to 3rd Battalion, 103rd Armor 1995.
- 110th Infantry (Pennsylvania Army National Guard)
  - 1st Battle Group, 110th Infantry (1959–1963)
  - 1st Battalion, 110th Infantry (1963–present)
  - 2nd Battalion, 110th Infantry (1975–1995) – Organized 1975 as part of 2nd Brigade, 28th Infantry Division from support units when the division returned to being an all-Pennsylvania unit. Reorganized as mechanized battalion 1994. Inactivated 1995 with some elements redesignated as part of 1st Battalion, 110th Infantry and 1st Battalion, 112th Infantry.
- 111th Infantry (Pennsylvania Army National Guard)
  - 1st Battle Group, 111th Infantry (1959–1963)
  - 2nd Battle Group, 111th Infantry (1959–1963)
  - 1st Battalion, 111th Infantry (1963–present)
  - 2nd Battalion, 111th Infantry (1963–1994) – Inactivated 1994 with personnel transferring to 1st Battalion, 111th Infantry.
- 112th Infantry (Pennsylvania Army National Guard)
  - 1st Battle Group, 112th Infantry (1959–1963)
  - 1st Battalion, 112th Infantry (1963–present)
  - 2nd Battalion, 112th Infantry (1975–present)
  - Company D, 112th Infantry (2006–present)
- 113th Infantry (New Jersey Army National Guard) - 113th and 215th Armored Infantry Battalions consolidated, reorganized, and redesignated 1 March 1959 as the 113th Infantry, a parent regiment under CARS, to consist of the 1st and 2nd Armored Rifle Battalions, elements of the 50th Armored Division. The regiment was reorganized on 31 January 1963 to consist of the 1st and 2nd Battalions, elements of the 50th Armored Division; on 1 July 1975 it added a 3rd Battalion, also an element of the 50th Armored Division; on 16 October 1984 it dropped the 1st Battalion, 2nd and 3rd Battalions remaining with the 50th AD; withdrawn from the Combat Arms Regimental System and reorganized under the United States Army Regimental System on 1 May 1989. On 1 September 1991 it was reorganized to consist of the 2nd Battalion, an element of the 50th Armored Division. The 2nd Battalion was reorganized over to the 42nd Infantry Division on 1 September 1993. The regiment was redesignated 1 October 2005 as the 113th Infantry Regiment. In 2012 the single remaining battalion of the regiment was assigned to the 50th Infantry Brigade Combat Team, NJ ARNG.
- 114th Infantry (New Jersey Army National Guard)
  - 1st Armored Infantry Battalion, 114th Infantry (1959–1963)
  - 2nd Armored Infantry Battalion, 114th Infantry (1959–1963)
  - 1st Battalion, 114th Infantry (1963–present)
  - 2nd Battalion, 114th Infantry (1963–1968)
  - 2nd Battalion, 114th Infantry (1975–1991)
- 115th Infantry (Maryland Army National Guard) – Consolidated into 175th Infantry 2006.
  - 1st Battle Group, 115th Infantry (1959–1963)
  - 2nd Battle Group, 115th Infantry (1959–1963)
  - 1st Battalion, 115th Infantry (1963–2006) – HHC Silver Spring. Members of Company B transferred to Company B, 1st Battalion, 175th Infantry.
  - 2nd Battalion, 115th Infantry (1963–1968) – HHC Salisbury, converted to 115th Military Police Battalion
  - 2nd Battalion, 115th Infantry (1985–2006) – HHC Chestertown. Redesignated from elements of 2nd Battalion, 175th Infantry, part of 3rd Brigade, 29th Infantry Division (Light). Consolidated into 1st Battalion, 175th Infantry.
- 116th Infantry (Virginia Army National Guard)
  - 1st Battle Group, 116th Infantry (1959–1963)
  - 2nd Battle Group, 116th Infantry (1959–1963)
  - 1st Battalion, 116th Infantry (1963–present)
  - 2nd Battalion, 116th Infantry (1963–2005)
  - 3rd Battalion, 116th Infantry (1968–present)
- 117th Infantry (Tennessee Army National Guard)
  - 1st Armored Rifle Battalion, 117th Infantry (1959–1963) – HHC Johnson City, converted from 176th Tank Battalion.
  - 2nd Armored Rifle Battalion, 117th Infantry (1959–1963) – HHC Athens, converted from 278th Armored Infantry Battalion.
  - 3rd Armored Rifle Battalion, 117th Infantry (1959–1963) – HHC Dyersburg, converted from 117th Armored Infantry Battalion.
  - 4th Armored Rifle Battalion, 117th Infantry (1959–1963) – HHC Henderson, converted from 170th Armored Infantry Battalion.
  - 1st Battalion, 117th Infantry (1963–1973) – HHC Johnson City, reorganized from 1st Armored Rifle Battalion, 117th Infantry. Converted to 176th Maintenance Battalion 1973.
  - 2nd Battalion, 117th Infantry (1963–1977) – HHC Athens, reorganized from 2nd Armored Rifle Battalion, 117th Infantry. Converted to 1st Squadron, 278th Armored Cavalry Regiment 1977.
  - 3rd Battalion, 117th Infantry (1963–1968) – HHC Dyersburg, reorganized from 3rd Armored Rifle Battalion, 117th Infantry. Converted to 168th Military Police Battalion 1968.
  - 3rd Battalion, 117th Infantry (1968–1980) – HHC Cookeville, converted from 1st Squadron, 230th Cavalry. Converted to 3rd Squadron, 278th Armored Cavalry Regiment 1980.
  - 4th Battalion, 117th Infantry (1963–?) – HHC Henderson, reorganized from 4th Armored Rifle Battalion, 117th Infantry. Part of 30th Armored Brigade from 1973.
- 118th Infantry (South Carolina Army National Guard)
  - 1st Battle Group, 118th Infantry (1959–1964) – HHC Charleston, part of 51st Infantry Division. 51st Infantry Division eliminated 1963 and battalion HHC relocated to Mount Pleasant.
  - 2nd Battle Group, 118th Infantry (1959–1964) – HHC Union, part of 51st Infantry Division. 51st Infantry Division eliminated 1963.
  - 3rd Battle Group, 118th Infantry (1959–1964) – HHC Florence, part of 51st Infantry Division. 51st Infantry Division eliminated 1963.
  - 1st Battalion, 118th Infantry (1964–present) – HHC Mount Pleasant, reorganized from 1st Battle Group, 118th Infantry
  - 2nd Battalion, 118th Infantry (1964–1968) – HHC Walterboro, reorganized from elements of 1st Battle Group, 118th Infantry. Consolidated into 1st Battalion, 118th Infantry.
  - 3rd Battalion, 118th Infantry (1963–1968) – HHC Florence, reorganized from 3rd Battle Group, 118th Infantry as mechanized battalion. Converted to 51st Military Police Battalion.
  - 4th Battalion, 118th Infantry (1964–present) – HHC Union, reorganized from 2nd Battle Group, 118th Infantry.
- 119th Infantry (North Carolina Army National Guard)
  - 1st Battle Group, 119th Infantry (1959–1963)
  - 2nd Battle Group, 119th Infantry (1959–1963)
  - 1st Battalion, 119th Infantry (1968–2005?)
  - 4th Battalion, 119th Infantry (1963–1968)
  - 5th Battalion, 119th Infantry (1963–1968)
  - 6th Battalion, 119th Infantry (1963–1968)
- 120th Infantry (North Carolina Army National Guard)
  - 1st Battle Group, 120th Infantry (1959–1963)
  - 2nd Battle Group, 120th Infantry (1959–1963)
  - 3rd Battle Group, 120th Infantry (1959–1963)
  - 1st Battalion, 120th Infantry (1963–present) – HHC Wilmington.
  - 2nd Battalion, 120th Infantry (1963–1993) – HHC Hickory, converted to support units 1993.
  - 3rd Battalion, 120th Infantry (1963–1968) – HHC Rocky Mount, broken up.
- 121st Infantry (Georgia Army National Guard)
  - 1st Armored Rifle Battalion, 121st Infantry (1959–1963)
  - 2nd Armored Rifle Battalion, 121st Infantry (1959–1963)
  - 1st Battalion, 121st Infantry (1963–present)
  - 2nd Battalion, 121st Infantry (1963–present)
  - 3rd Battalion, 121st Infantry (1963–1968)
  - 4th Battalion, 121st Infantry (1963–1968)
  - Company H, 121st Infantry (1987–2011)
- 122nd Infantry (Georgia Army National Guard) – Consolidated into 121st Infantry 1992
  - 1st Battalion, 122nd Infantry (1980–1992) – Separate TOW battalion
  - Company H, 122nd Infantry (1987–1992)
- 123rd Infantry (Illinois Army National Guard)
  - 1st Battalion, 123rd Infantry (1968–1999) – Converted 1968 from elements of 1st Battalion, 126th Armor. HHC Bloomington, converted from mechanized to air assault 1996. Inactivated 1999 (elements consolidated with 2nd Battalion, 130th Infantry and 1st Battalion, 131st Infantry).
- 124th Infantry (Florida Army National Guard)
  - 1st Armored Rifle Battalion, 124th Infantry (1959–1963)
  - 2nd Armored Rifle Battalion, 124th Infantry (1959–1963)
  - 1st Battalion, 124th Infantry (1963–present)
  - 2nd Battalion, 124th Infantry (1963–present)
  - 3rd Battalion, 124th Infantry (1968–2007) – Converted to 1st Squadron, 153rd Cavalry Regiment 2007.
- 125th Infantry (Michigan Army National Guard)
  - 1st Battle Group, 125th Infantry (1959–1963)
  - 2nd Battle Group, 125th Infantry (1959–1963)
  - 1st Battalion, 125th Infantry (1963–present)
  - 2nd Battalion, 125th Infantry (1963–1968)
- 126th Infantry (Michigan Army National Guard) – Consolidated 1999 with 246th Armor to become 126th Armor, Converted to 126th Cavalry 2007, returned to 126th Infantry 2016
  - 1st Battle Group, 126th Infantry (1959–1963)
  - 2nd Battle Group, 126th Infantry (1959–1963)
  - 1st Battalion, 126th Infantry (1963–1968)
  - 2nd Battalion, 126th Infantry (1963–1968)
  - 3rd Battalion, 126th Infantry (1963–1999)
  - 3rd Battalion, 126th Infantry (2016–present) – Converted from 1st Squadron, 126th Cavalry 2016, part of 32nd Infantry Brigade Combat Team
- 127th Infantry (Wisconsin Army National Guard)
  - 1st Battle Group, 127th Infantry (1959–1963)
  - 2nd Battle Group, 127th Infantry (1959–1963)
  - 3rd Battle Group, 127th Infantry (1959–1963)
  - 1st Battalion, 127th Infantry (1963–1980) – Separate light infantry battalion, disbanded 1980
  - 2nd Battalion, 127th Infantry (1963–present)
  - 3rd Battalion, 127th Infantry (1963–1967)
- 128th Infantry (Wisconsin Army National Guard)
  - 1st Battle Group, 128th Infantry (1959–1963)
  - 2nd Battle Group, 128th Infantry (1959–1963)
  - 1st Battalion, 128th Infantry (1963–present)
  - 2nd Battalion, 128th Infantry (1963–1992) – Separate light infantry battalion until 1980 when converted to TOW battalion
  - 2nd Battalion, 128th Infantry (2003–2007) – Converted to 1st Squadron, 105th Cavalry 2007
  - 3rd Battalion, 128th Infantry (1963–1967)
- 129th Infantry (Illinois Army National Guard)
  - 1st Battle Group, 129th Infantry (1959–1963) – HHC Sycamore, with 33rd Infantry Division
  - 2nd Battle Group, 129th Infantry (1959–1963) – HHC Aurora, with 33rd Infantry Division
  - 1st Battalion, 129th Infantry (1963–1976) – HHC Rock Falls and Dixon, with 1st Brigade, 33rd Infantry Division. To 66th Brigade, 47th Infantry Division 1968. Inactivated 1976.
  - 2nd Battalion, 129th Infantry (1963–1992) – HHC Sycamore, with 1st Brigade, 33rd Infantry Division. To Selected Reserve Force 3rd Brigade, 33rd Infantry Division 1965, which became 33rd Infantry Brigade (Separate) 1968. By 1968 HHC at Joliet, where it remained until battalion reflagged as 1st Battalion, 131st Infantry 1992.
- 130th Infantry (Illinois Army National Guard)
  - 1st Battle Group, 130th Infantry (1959–1963) – HHC Cairo, with 33rd Infantry Division
  - 2nd Battle Group, 130th Infantry (1959–1963) – HHC Decatur, 33rd Infantry Division
  - 1st Battalion, 130th Infantry (1963–1968)
  - 2nd Battalion, 130th Infantry (1963–present)
  - 3rd Battalion, 130th Infantry (1963–1996) – Converted to 3rd Battalion, 123rd Field Artillery 1996.
- 131st Infantry (Illinois Army National Guard)
  - 1st Battle Group, 131st Infantry (1959–1963) – HHC Chicago, with 33rd Infantry Division
  - 1st Battalion, 131st Infantry (1963–1992) – HHC Chicago, inactivated 1992. Company A at Woodstock retained its letter and became part of 1st Battalion, 178th Infantry.
  - 1st Battalion, 131st Infantry (1992–2006) – HHC Joliet, reflagged 1992 from 2nd Battalion, 129th Infantry. Eliminated 2006, Company D at Pontiac converted to Troop A of the newly formed 2nd Squadron, 106th Cavalry.
- 133rd Infantry (Iowa Army National Guard)
  - 1st Battle Group, 133rd Infantry (1959–1964)
  - 2nd Battle Group, 133rd Infantry (1959–1963)
  - 1st Battalion, 133rd Infantry (1964–present)
  - 2nd Battalion, 133rd Infantry (1963–1997)
  - 3rd Battalion, 133rd Infantry (1964–1968)
- 134th Infantry (Nebraska Army National Guard) – Lineage consolidated into 167th Cavalry 2003, latter renumbered 134th Cavalry 2005
  - 1st Battle Group, 134th Infantry (1959–1963)
  - 2nd Battle Group, 134th Infantry (1959–1963)
  - 1st Battalion, 134th Infantry (1963–2001) – HHC Omaha. Inactivated 2001 during conversion of 67th Infantry Brigade to 67th Area Support Group with elements converted to chemical and transportation units.
  - 2nd Battalion, 134th Infantry (1963–1995) – HHC Lincoln. Eliminated 1995 under budget cuts with personnel divided between 1st Battalion, 134th Infantry and 1st Squadron, 167th Cavalry.
- 134th Infantry (Airborne) (Nebraska Army National Guard)
  - 2nd Battalion, 134th Infantry (2019–present) – HHC Lincoln. Part of 45th Infantry Brigade Combat Team.
- 135th Infantry (Minnesota Army National Guard) - the 135th Infantry was organized and was federally recognized on 16 January 1953 with headquarters at Mankato, Minnesota. Released on 2 December 1954 from active Federal service and reverted to state control. Federal recognition was concurrently withdrawn from the 135th Infantry. Reorganized on 22 February 1959 as a parent regiment under the Combat Arms Regimental System to consist of the 1st, 2nd, and 3rd Battle Groups, elements of the 47th Infantry Division. Reorganized on 1 April 1963 to consist of the 1st, 2nd, 3rd, and 4th Battalions, elements of the 47th Infantry Division. 1 February 1968 it was reorganized once again to consist of the 1st and 2nd Battalions, elements of the 47th Infantry Division. Transferred from CARS and reorganized under the United States Army Regimental System on 30 November 1988. 1st and 2nd Battalions, 135th Infantry were relieved on 10 February 1991 from assignment to the 47th Infantry Division and assigned to the 34th Infantry Division. Reorganized on 1 September 1992 to consist of the 2nd Battalion; thereafter part of a brigade of the 34th Infantry Division.
- 136th Infantry (Minnesota Army National Guard)
  - 1st Battle Group, 136th Infantry (1959–1963) – Part of the 47th Infantry Division.
  - 2nd Battle Group, 136th Infantry (1959–1963) – Part of the 47th Infantry Division.
  - 1st Battalion, 136th Infantry (1963–1992) – HHC St. Cloud, separate mechanized battalion from 1968. Eliminated during 1992 budget cuts.
  - 2nd Battalion, 136th Infantry (1963–present) – HHC Moorhead, combined arms battalion part of the 1st Armored Brigade Combat Team, 34th Infantry Division.
- 137th Infantry (Kansas Army National Guard)
  - 1st Battle Group, 137th Infantry (1959–1963) – HHC Wichita, part of the 35th Infantry Division.
  - 2nd Battle Group, 137th Infantry (1959–1963) – HHC Kansas City, part of the 35th Infantry Division.
  - 1st Battalion, 137th Infantry (1963–1992) – HHC Wichita, inactivated during 1992 budget cuts, with several companies realigned under other Kansas units.
  - 2nd Battalion, 137th Infantry (1963–present) – HHC Kansas City, consolidated with 1st Battalion, 635th Armor 2008 to become combined arms battalion. Aligned with 155th Armored Brigade Combat Team for training 2012.
  - 3rd Battalion, 137th Infantry (1967–1976) – HHC Iola, reorganized from the 195th Engineer Group. Part of 69th Infantry Brigade, converted to the 891st Engineer Battalion.
- 138th Infantry (Missouri Army National Guard)
  - 1st Battle Group, 138th Infantry (1959–1963)
  - 1st Battalion, 138th Infantry (1963–1974) – HHC St. Louis, reorganized as mechanized infantry 1968. Relocated to Jefferson Barracks 1971 and converted to 1138th Engineer Battalion 1974.
  - 1st Battalion, 138th Infantry (2008–present) – HHC Kansas City.
- 140th Infantry (Missouri Army National Guard)
  - 1st Battle Group, 140th Infantry (1959–1963)
  - 2nd Battle Group, 140th Infantry (1959–1963)
  - 1st Battalion, 140th Infantry (1963–1968)
  - 2nd Battalion, 140th Infantry (1963–1968)
- 141st Infantry (Texas Army National Guard)
  - 1st Battle Group, 141st Infantry (1959–1963) – Part of the 36th Infantry Division
  - 1st Battalion, 141st Infantry (1963–present)
  - 2nd Battalion, 141st Infantry (1963–1994)
  - 3rd Battalion, 141st Infantry (1968–present)
- 142nd Infantry (Texas Army National Guard)
  - 1st Battle Group, 142nd Infantry (1959–1963)
  - 2nd Battle Group, 142nd Infantry (1959–1963)
  - 1st Battalion, 142nd Infantry (1963–1968)
  - 2nd Battalion, 142nd Infantry (1963–present) – Part of the 56th Infantry Brigade Combat Team
- 143rd Infantry (Texas Army National Guard)
  - 1st Battle Group, 143rd Infantry (1959-1963) – Part of the 36th Infantry Division
  - 2nd Battle Group, 143rd Infantry (1959-1963) – Part of the 36th Infantry Division
  - 1st Battalion, 143rd Infantry (1967-1980) Part of the 36th Infantry Brigade (Separate) (1967) assigned to 71st Airborne Brigade (1968-1973) assigned to 36th Airborne Brigade (1973-1980)
  - 2nd Battalion, 143rd Infantry (1963-1980) Part of 36th Infantry Division (1963-1967) assigned to 36th Infantry Brigade (Separate) (1967) assigned to 71st Airborne Brigade (1968-1973) assigned to 36th Airborne Brigade (1973-1980)
  - 3rd Battalion, 143rd Infantry (1963-1973) Part of 36th Infantry Division (1963–67) assigned to 36th Infantry Brigade (Separate) (1967) assigned to 71st Airborne Brigade (1968-1973)
  - Co G 143rd Infantry (1980-2001) - Ranger Company (1980-1987)
  - 143rd Infantry Detachment (1987-2008) Part of 49th Armored Division (1987-2004) assigned to 36th Infantry Division (2004-2008)
  - 1st Battalion (Airborne) 143rd Infantry (2010 – present) Part of the 56th Infantry Brigade Combat Team, Paired with the 173rd Airborne Brigade (2016 – present)
- 144th Infantry
- 145th Infantry (Ohio Army National Guard) – Consolidated with 107th Armored Cavalry 1974, lineage perpetuated by 145th Armored
  - 1st Battle Group, 145th Infantry (1959–1963)
  - 2nd Battle Group, 145th Infantry (1959–1963)
  - 1st Battalion, 145th Infantry (1963–1974)
  - 2nd Battalion, 145th Infantry (1963–1968)
  - 3rd Battalion, 145th Infantry (1963–1968)
- 147th Infantry (Ohio Army National Guard) – Converted to 147th Armor 1994, lineage perpetuated by 174th Air Defense Artillery
  - 1st Battle Group, 147th Infantry (1959–1963) – Part of the 37th Infantry Division
  - 1st Battalion, 147th Infantry (1963–1994)
  - 2nd Battalion, 147th Infantry (1963–1968)
- 148th Infantry (Ohio Army National Guard)
  - 1st Battle Group, 148th Infantry (1959–1963) – Part of the 37th Infantry Division
  - 2nd Battle Group, 148th Infantry (1959–1963) – Part of the 37th Infantry Division
  - 1st Battalion, 148th Infantry (1963–present) – HHC Lima, changed to Walbridge 2007, part of 37th Infantry Brigade Combat Team
  - 2nd Battalion, 148th Infantry (1963–1968)
- 149th Infantry (Kentucky Army National Guard) – Converted 1964 from 1st Medium Tank Battalion, 123rd Armor, broken up 1968, returned to 149th Infantry 1974
  - 1st Battalion, 149th Infantry (1964–1968) – Converted to 149th Military Police Battalion 1968
  - 1st Battalion, 149th Infantry (1974–present)
- 151st Infantry (Indiana Army National Guard)
  - 1st Battle Group, 151st Infantry (1959–1963)
  - 1st Battalion, 151st Infantry (1963–present) - Airborne Battalion(1965-1967), Constituted airborne personnel into Company D & E 151st Infantry (LRP)
  - 2nd Battalion, 151st Infantry (1963–1967)
  - 2nd Battalion, 151st Infantry (1977–present)
  - Company D, 151st Infantry (1967–1977) – Ranger Company, constituted Co D 75th Infantry (1959) consolidated Troop A, 1st Squadron, 238th Cavalry.
  - Company E, 151st Infantry (1967–1971) – Ranger Company, Consolidated with Company D, 151st Infantry.
- 152nd Infantry (now 152nd Cavalry)
- 153rd Infantry (Arkansas Army National Guard)
  - 1st Battle Group, 153rd Infantry (1959–1963)
  - 2nd Battle Group, 153rd Infantry (1959–1963)
  - 1st Battalion, 153rd Infantry (1963–present)
  - 2nd Battalion, 153rd Infantry (1963–present)
  - 3rd Battalion, 153rd Infantry (1967–2005) – Converted to 1st Squadron, 151st Cavalry
- 155th Infantry (Mississippi Army National Guard)
  - 1st Battle Group, 155th Infantry (1959–1963)
  - 2nd Battle Group, 155th Infantry (1959–1963)
  - 1st Battalion, 155th Infantry (1963–present)
  - 2nd Battalion, 155th Infantry (1963–1968)
  - 3rd Battalion, 155th Infantry (1963–1968)
- 156th Infantry (Louisiana Army National Guard)
  - 1st Battle Group, 156th Infantry (1959–1963)
  - 2nd Battle Group, 156th Infantry (1959–1963)
  - 3rd Battle Group, 156th Infantry (1959–1963)
  - 1st Battalion, 156th Infantry (1963–1977) – Converted into 1st Battalion, 156th Armor 1977.
  - 2nd Battalion, 156th Infantry (1963–present)
  - 3rd Battalion, 156th Infantry (1963–present)
  - 4th Battalion, 156th Infantry (1963–1967)
  - 4th Battalion, 156th Infantry (1991–1993) – Activated 1991 from excess personnel of the 527th and 528th Engineer Battalions as a mechanized battalion of the 36th Brigade, 49th Armored Division. Eliminated under Fiscal Year 1992 budget cuts.
- 157th Infantry (Colorado Army National Guard) – Constituted 2007
  - 1st Battalion, 157th Infantry (2008–present)
- 158th Infantry (Arizona Army National Guard) – Broken up 1967, 180th Field Artillery converted to 158th Infantry 2005
  - 1st Battle Group, 158th Infantry (1959–1963)
  - 2nd Battle Group, 158th Infantry (1959–1963)
  - 1st Battalion, 158th Infantry (1963–1967) – Converted to the 1581st Military Police Battalion.
  - 2nd Battalion, 158th Infantry (1963–1967) – Converted to the 1120th Transportation Battalion.
  - .3rd Battalion, 158th Infantry (1963–1967) – Converted to the 1583rd Military Police Battalion.
  - 1st Battalion, 158th Infantry (2005–present) – HHC Mesa, converted from 1st Battalion, 180th Field Artillery.
- 159th Infantry (California Army National Guard)
  - 1st Battle Group, 159th Infantry (1959–1963)
  - 2nd Battle Group, 159th Infantry (1959–1963)
  - 1st Battalion, 159th Infantry (1963–1976)
  - 2nd Battalion, 159th Infantry (1963–2000) – HHC San Jose, became elements of 49th Combat Support Command, lineage of 159th to 980th Quartermaster Battalion
- 160th Infantry (California Army National Guard)
  - 1st Armored Rifle Battalion, 160th Infantry (1959–1963)
  - 2nd Armored Rifle Battalion, 160th Infantry (1959–1963)
  - 3rd Armored Rifle Battalion, 160th Infantry (1959–1963)
  - 4th Armored Rifle Battalion, 160th Infantry (1959–1963)
  - 1st Battalion, 160th Infantry (1963–1985)
  - 1st Battalion, 160th Infantry (1999–present)
  - 2nd Battalion, 160th Infantry (1963–2000) – HHC Fresno, reflagged as 1st Battalion, 185th Infantry
  - 3rd Battalion, 160th Infantry (1963–2007)
  - 4th Battalion, 160th Infantry (1963–1999)
- 161st Infantry (Washington Army National Guard)
  - 1st Battle Group, 161st Infantry (1959–1963)
  - 2nd Battle Group, 161st Infantry (1959–1963)
  - 1st Battalion, 161st Infantry (1963–present) – HHC Spokane, part of 81st Stryker Brigade Combat Team.
  - 2nd Battalion, 161st Infantry (1963–1974) – HHC Everett. Converted to 1st Battalion, 803rd Armor.
  - 3rd Battalion, 161st Infantry (1968–2005) – HHC Kent.
  - 3rd Battalion, 161st Infantry (2016–present) – HHC Kent, converted from 1st Squadron, 303rd Cavalry when the 81st Armored Brigade Combat Team became the 81st Stryker Brigade Combat Team
- 162nd Infantry (Oregon Army National Guard)
  - 1st Battle Group, 162nd Infantry (1959–1963) – HHC Portland, part of the 41st Infantry Division.
  - 1st Battalion, 162nd Infantry (1963–2006) – HHC Portland, part of 2nd Brigade, 41st Infantry Division. By 1965 HHC moved to Forest Grove when the battalion became part of the Selected Reserve Force 41st Infantry Brigade. Became part of 41st Infantry Brigade (Separate) in 1968 when division eliminated. Eliminated 2006 with subordinate companies converted to elements of 2nd Battalion, 218th Field Artillery or redesignated under 2nd Battalion, 162nd Infantry and 1st Battalion, 186th Infantry.
  - 2nd Battalion, 162nd Infantry (1963–present) – HHC Eugene, part of 2nd Brigade, 41st Infantry Division. Became part of 41st Infantry Brigade (Separate) in 1968 when division eliminated.
- 163rd Infantry (Montana Army National Guard) – Reorganized from 163rd Armored Cavalry along with 163rd Cavalry 1988
  - 1st Battalion, 163rd Infantry (1988–1995) – HHC Billings, converted to mechanized infantry from 1st Squadron, 163rd Armored Cavalry when 163rd Armored Cavalry became the 163rd Armored Brigade. Converted to 1st Battalion, 190th Field Artillery when 163rd Armored Brigade eliminated.
  - 1st Battalion, 163rd Infantry (1995–2007) – HHC Bozeman, converted from 163rd Armored Brigade units including elements of 1st Battalion, 163rd Cavalry. Part of the 116th Cavalry Brigade. In 2004 HHC relocated to new armory in Belgrade. Converted to 1st Battalion, 163rd Cavalry 2007.
- 165th Infantry (New York Army National Guard) – Reorganized and redesignated 15 April 1963 as the 69th Infantry to conform to New York state designation
  - 1st Battle Group, 165th Infantry (1959–1963) – Part of the 42nd Infantry Division.
- 166th Infantry (Ohio Army National Guard) – Consolidated into 148th Infantry 1992.
  - 1st Battle Group, 166th Infantry (1959–1963) – Part of the 37th Infantry Division.
  - 1st Battalion, 166th Infantry (1963–1992) – HHC Columbus, part of 73rd Brigade, 38th Infantry Division from 1968 and 73rd Infantry Brigade from 1977. Consolidated into 1st Battalion, 148th Infantry.
- 167th Infantry (Alabama Army National Guard)
  - 1st Battle Group, 167th Infantry (1959–1963) – HHC Birmingham, part of the 31st Infantry Division.
  - 2nd Battle Group, 167th Infantry (1959–1963) – HHC Opelika, part of the 31st Infantry Division.
  - 1st Battalion, 167th Infantry (1963–present)
- 168th Infantry (Iowa Army National Guard)
  - 1st Battle Group, 168th Infantry (1959–1964)
  - 1st Battalion, 168th Infantry (1964–present) – Expanded 1964 from 1st Battle Group, 168th Infantry. Part of the 2nd Infantry Brigade Combat Team, 34th Infantry Division since modularization.
  - 2nd Battalion, 168th Infantry (1964–1968) – Expanded 1964 from 1st Battle Group, 168th Infantry. Eliminated 1968, units became part of 1st Battalion, 168th Infantry.
- 169th Infantry (Connecticut Army National Guard)
  - 1st Battle Group, 169th Infantry (1959–1963)
  - 2nd Battle Group, 169th Infantry (1959–1963) – Converted to 169th Military Police Battalion 1963
  - 1st Battalion, 169th Infantry (1963–1992) – Redesignated 3rd Battalion, 102nd Infantry 1992
- 170th Infantry (Virginia Army National Guard)
  - 1st Battalion, 170th Infantry (1986–1995) – HHC Fort Belvoir, part of 2nd Brigade, 29th Infantry Division.
- 172nd Infantry (Vermont Army National Guard) – Consolidated into 172nd Armor 1964
  - 1st Battle Group, 172nd Infantry (1959–1963)
  - 1st Battalion, 172nd Infantry (1963–1964)
- 172nd Infantry (Vermont Army National Guard) – Redesignated 1983 from 72nd Infantry, Vermont Army National Guard, reorganized 1992 in Maine, New Hampshire, New York, and Vermont Army National Guards
  - Company A, 172nd Infantry (1983–1984)
  - 3rd Battalion, 172nd Infantry (1983–present) – Separate mountain battalion
- 173rd Infantry (Alabama Army National Guard) – Converted from 131st Cavalry 2016
  - 1st Battalion, 173rd Infantry Regiment (2016–present) – Redesignated 2016 from 1st Squadron, 131st Cavalry to serve as a maneuver battalion with the 256th Infantry Brigade Combat Team.
- 174th Infantry (New York Army National Guard) – Lineage consolidated with 127th Armor 1 September 1992
  - 1st Armored Rifle Battalion, 174th Infantry (1959–1963) – Redesignated 1959 from 174th Armored Infantry Battalion, part of 27th Armored Division.
  - 1st Battalion, 174th Infantry (1963–1992) – Redesignated 1963 from 1st Armored Rifle Battalion, 174th Infantry.
  - 2nd Battalion, 174th Infantry (1984–1991)
- 175th Infantry (Maryland Army National Guard)
  - 1st Battle Group, 175th Infantry (1959–1963)
  - 1st Battalion, 175th Infantry (1963–present)
  - 2nd Battalion, 175th Infantry (1963–1996)
- 176th Infantry (Virginia Army National Guard) – Converted to 276th Engineer Battalion 1963
  - 1st Battle Group, 176th Infantry (1959–1963) – Reorganized 1959 from 3rd Battalion, 176th Infantry.
- 178th Infantry (Illinois Army National Guard)
  - 1st Battle Group, 178th Infantry (1959–1963) – Nondivisional battalion
  - 1st Battalion, 178th Infantry (1963–present)
  - 2nd Battalion, 178th Infantry (1963–1968)
- 179th Infantry (Oklahoma Army National Guard)
  - 1st Battle Group, 179th Infantry (1959–1963)
  - 2nd Battle Group, 179th Infantry (1959–1963)
  - 1st Battalion, 179th Infantry (1963–present)
  - 2nd Battalion, 179th Infantry (1963–1968)
- 180th Infantry (Oklahoma Army National Guard) – Converted to 180th Cavalry 2008
  - 1st Battle Group, 180th Infantry (1959–1963)
  - 2nd Battle Group, 180th Infantry (1959–1963)
  - 1st Battalion, 180th Infantry (1963–2008)
  - 2nd Battalion, 180th Infantry (1963–1968)
  - 2nd Battalion, 180th Infantry (1977–1992) – Separate TOW battalion, inactivated 1992.
- 181st Infantry (Massachusetts Army National Guard)
  - 1st Battle Group, 181st Infantry (1959–1963)
  - 1st Battalion, 181st Infantry (1963–present)
  - 2nd Battalion, 181st Infantry (1975–1988) – Converted from 181st Engineer Battalion 1975 as mechanized infantry battalion of the 26th Infantry Division. Eliminated with 1st Brigade, 26th Infantry Division.
- 182nd Infantry (Massachusetts Army National Guard) – Converted into 182nd Cavalry 2006 and back to 182nd Infantry 2009
  - 1st Battle Group, 182nd Infantry (1959–1963)
  - 1st Battalion, 182nd Infantry (1963–2006, 2009–present) – Converted to 1st Squadron, 182nd Cavalry 2006, returned to infantry 2009
- 183rd Infantry (Virginia Army National Guard) (now 183rd Cavalry)
  - 1st Battalion, 183rd Infantry (1986–1996) – HHC Richmond, part of 2nd Brigade, 29th Infantry Division. Inactivated 1996 with most soldiers going to 1st Battalion, 111th Field Artillery, reactivated that year.
- 184th Infantry (California Army National Guard) On 10 October 1946, the 184th Infantry Regiment was reorganized and federally recognized, with headquarters in Sacramento, as part of the 49th Infantry Division of the California National Guard. On 1 May 1959, the 184th Infantry Regiment was reorganized as the 184th Infantry, under CARS, to consist of the 1st and 2d Battle Groups, elements of the 49th Infantry Division. The lineage of Company A, 184th Infantry Regiment was used to form HHC, 1st Battle Group, 184th Infantry, while the lineage of Company B, 184th Infantry Regiment was used to form HHC, 2d Battle Group, 184th Infantry. On 1 March 1963, both battle groups became battalions once more, under the new Reorganization Objective Army Division (ROAD) structure.
- 185th Infantry (California Army National Guard) – Disbanded 2008
  - 1st Battle Group, 185th Infantry (1959–1963) – Part of the 49th Infantry Division.
  - 1st Battalion, 185th Infantry (1963–1968)
  - 2nd Battalion, 185th Infantry (1963–1976)
  - 1st Battalion, 185th Infantry (2000–2008) – HHC Fresno, reflagged from 2nd Battalion, 160th Infantry. Disbanded 2008.
- 185th Infantry (California Army National Guard) – Converted 2016 from 185th Armor
  - 1st Battalion, 185th Infantry (2016–present) – Redesignated from 1st Battalion, 185th Armor as a result of conversion of the 81st Armored Brigade Combat Team to the 81st Stryker Brigade Combat Team.
- 186th Infantry (Oregon Army National Guard)
  - 1st Battle Group, 186th Infantry (1959–1963) – HHC La Grande, reorganized from 2nd Battalion, 186th Infantry. Part of the 41st Infantry Division.
  - 2nd Battle Group, 186th Infantry (1959–1963) – HHC Eugene, reorganized from elements of 3rd Battalion, 162nd Infantry. Part of the 41st Infantry Division. Reorganized as 2nd Battalion, 162nd Infantry.
  - 1st Battalion, 186th Infantry (1963–present)
  - 2nd Battalion, 186th Infantry (1963–1968) – Reorganized from 1st Battle Group, 186th Infantry, remained part of the 41st Infantry Division. Converted to 3rd Squadron, 163rd Armored Cavalry together with 2nd Battalion, 303rd Armor.
- 194th Infantry (Minnesota Army National Guard) – Converted to 194th Armor 2000
  - 1st Battalion, 194th Infantry (1992–2000) – Reorganized from 1st Squadron, 194th Cavalry, converted into 1st Battalion, 194th Armor
- 200th Infantry (Alabama Army National Guard)
  - 1st Battle Group, 200th Infantry (1959–1963) – HHC Tuscaloosa, part of the 31st Infantry Division.
  - 1st Battalion, 200th Infantry (1963–1968) – HHC Tuscaloosa, part of the 2nd Brigade, 31st Infantry Division.
  - 2nd Battalion, 200th Infantry (1963–1968) – HHC Tallassee, part of the 2nd Brigade, 31st Infantry Division.
  - Company E, 200th Infantry (1969–1972) – Ranger company, organized from personnel assigned to the 788th Light Maintenance Company, Consolidated with Co A 1st Battalion, 20th Special Forces Group
- 200th Infantry (New Mexico Army National Guard) – Converted from 200th Air Defense Artillery
  - 1st Battalion, 200th Infantry (2005–present)
  - 2nd Battalion, 200th Infantry (2005–2008) – HHC Las Cruces, converted to light infantry from 1st Battalion, 202nd Field Artillery. Inactivated 2008.
- 211th Infantry (Florida Army National Guard)
  - 1st Battle Group, 211th Infantry (1959–1963)
  - 2nd Battle Group, 211th Infantry (1959–1963)
- 220th Infantry (Massachusetts Army National Guard) – Lineage consolidated into 126th Signal Battalion
  - 1st Battle Group, 220th Infantry (1959–1963)
  - 1st Battalion, 220th Infantry (1963–1975) – Eliminated 1975 and consolidated into 1st Battalion, 182nd Infantry
- 225th Infantry (Michigan Army National Guard)
  - 1st Battalion 225th Infantry Assigned to 46th Infantry Division (1959-1977) Redesignated Airborne Infantry Battalion (1965-1969) used airborne personnel to form Co E & F 425th Infantry, assigned to 38th Infantry Division (1977-1993)
- 242nd Infantry (New York Army National Guard) – Converted 1975 from 142nd Armor
  - 1st Battalion, 242nd Infantry (1975–1984) – Converted 1975 from 1st Battalion, 142nd Armor, part of 1st Brigade, 42nd Infantry Division. Disbanded 1984.
- 249th Infantry (Oregon Army National Guard)
  - 1st Battalion, 249th Infantry (1980–1993) – HHD Newberg, separate TOW battalion.
- 259th Infantry (Delaware Army National Guard)
  - Company A 259th Infantry (1971-1974), Ranger Company, Organized from personnel assigned to 1049th Trans. Co.
- 279th Infantry (Oklahoma Army National Guard)
  - 1st Battle Group, 279th Infantry (1959–1963)
  - 1st Battalion, 279th Infantry (1963–present) – Briefly reorganized as 279th Cavalry 1 September 2008 and reverted to 279th Infantry on 1 December of that year when 180th Infantry was instead converted to cavalry
  - 2nd Battalion, 279th Infantry (1963–1968)
- 293rd Infantry (Indiana Army National Guard)
  - 1st Battle Group, 293rd Infantry (1959–1963)
  - 2nd Battle Group, 293rd Infantry (1959–1963)
  - 1st Battalion, 293rd Infantry (1963–present) – HHC Fort Wayne, part of 76th Infantry Brigade Combat Team.
  - 2nd Battalion, 293rd Infantry (1963–1999) – HHC Logansport.
- 294th Infantry (Guam Army National Guard)
  - 1st Battalion, 294th Infantry (1987–present) – Company A reorganized from 721st Signal Company 1 October 1987.
- 295th Infantry (Puerto Rico Army National Guard)
- 296th Infantry (Puerto Rico Army National Guard)
- 297th Infantry (Alaska Army National Guard) - constituted in 1939 and organized in 1940 and 1941, the one-battalion regiment remained in Alaska during World War II, and became a separate infantry battalion in 1944. The 297th was reconstituted in 1959 with two battalions and a battle group, which later became a third battalion. In 1972, it was split into the 297th Infantry and the 297th Cavalry but both units merged as the 297th Infantry in 1976. In 2016, the 297th Cavalry became an infantry unit again. Now the 1st Battalion remains, tactically part of the 29th Infantry Brigade Combat Team.
- 298th Infantry formed 1923, HI ARNG. Served with United States Army Central Pacific during the Pacific War. Re-federally recognized on 9 September 1946, transitioning into support roles. On 8 January 1957 the 298th Infantry was reorganized and redesignated as the 298th Antiaircraft Artillery Group. It was further redesignated as the 298th Artillery Group (Air Defense) on 15 November 1961. It manned Nike-Hercules surface-to-air missile posts. On 22 January 1972 it was reorganized and redesignated as the 298th Field Depot, at Wahiawa, Hawaii. On 1 June 1976 the 298th Field Depot was inactivated, and its Headquarters and Headquarters Company being consolidated with Headquarters and Headquarters Detachment, Hawaii Army National Guard. A separate organisation without a lineage connection, the 298th Multi-Functional Training Regiment (MFTR), was established in 1997-98. Its 1st and 2nd Battalions were federally recognized on 16 August 1997, supporting the 29th Infantry Brigade’s enhanced readiness initiative.
- 299th Infantry (Hawaii Army National Guard) – Converted 2006 to 299th Cavalry
  - 1st Battle Group, 299th Infantry (1959–1963)
  - 2nd Battle Group, 299th Infantry (1959–1963)
  - 1st Battalion, 299th Infantry (1963–1995)
  - 2nd Battalion, 299th Infantry (1963–2006) – Converted to 1st Squadron, 299th Cavalry 2006.
  - 3rd Battalion, 299th Infantry (1963–1965)
- 425th Infantry (Michigan National Guard)
  - Company E 425th Infantry (1968-1972) Ranger Company, organized from 1st Battalion 225th Infantry consolidated into Co F 425th Infantry
  - Company F 425th Infantry (1968-2011) Ranger Company (1968-1987), organized from 1st Battalion 225th Infantry
