= Texas special operations units =

Texas special operations units of the Texas Military Forces conduct special operations for the Texas Military Department via the Domestic Operations Command (DOMOPS) while under Title 32 command, and via United States Special Operations Command (SOCOM) while under Title 10 command.

== History ==
=== Origins ===
Established in 1823 and officially organized in 1835 by Stephen Austin and Moses Morrison, the Texas Rangers served as the first special operations unit of the Texas Military Department until 1935 when they were re-designated to the Texas Department of Public Safety as a State Bureau of Investigation. Their Special Operations Group was reestablished in 2011, consisting of six units. However, the Rangers did not begin conducting special operations until the Texas—Indian Wars via their Frontier Forces and Special Forces companies, among others.

The first special operations conducted by Texas Military Forces occurred during the Texas Revolution by ad-hoc units that executed reconnaissance, rescue, and demolition missions. They were primarily directed by Deaf Smith whom William Travis described as "the Bravest of the Brave in the cause of Texas" and Sam Houston as his "stay in my darkest hour...a man more brave, and honest, never lived". Smith was instrumental in advising Houston in the controversial strategy that mirrored Comanche guerrilla tactics in evasion and selective attacks against Santa Anna's forces. The strategy resulted in the Runaway Scrape, mutiny, and accusations of cowardice, but ultimately victory at the Battle of San Jacinto.

== Current units ==
=== Texas Army National Guard ===
- (Since 1989) Joint Counterdrug Task Force (Reconnaissance, Interdiction)
  - Counterdrug Special Operations Detachment (SOD)
- (Since 1998) Homeland Response Force
  - 6th Civil Support Team (Weapons of Mass Destruction)
- (Since 2008) 19th Special Forces Group
  - C Company, 1st Battalion
  - A Company, 5th Battalion
  - 197th Special Troops Support Company
- (Since 2012) Special Operations Detachment - Africa, 71st Troop Command
  - Deploys in CONUS and conducts Command and Control of Special Operations and sensitive interagency liaison missions in support of State and Federal Homeland Security Operations.

=== Texas Air National Guard ===
- (Since 2009) 147th Air Support Operations Squadron, 147th Attack Wing
  - 147th Tactical Air Control Party Specialists
  - 147th Joint Terminal Attack Controllers

== Former Units ==
=== Texas Rangers ===
- (1846-1848) Frontier Regiment (Reconnaissance and Guerilla Warfare during Mexican—American War).
- (1861-1865) State Troops
- (1870-1901) Frontier Forces
- (1874-1881) Special Forces

=== Texas Brigade ===
- (1862-1864). Shock troops that received advanced training and equipment and conducted unconventional methods and tactics in direct action assaults. When the first units reached Virginia, Jefferson Davis reportedly greeted them by declaring: "Texans! The troops of other states have their reputations to gain, but the sons of the defenders of the Alamo have theirs to maintain."

=== Texas Army National Guard ===
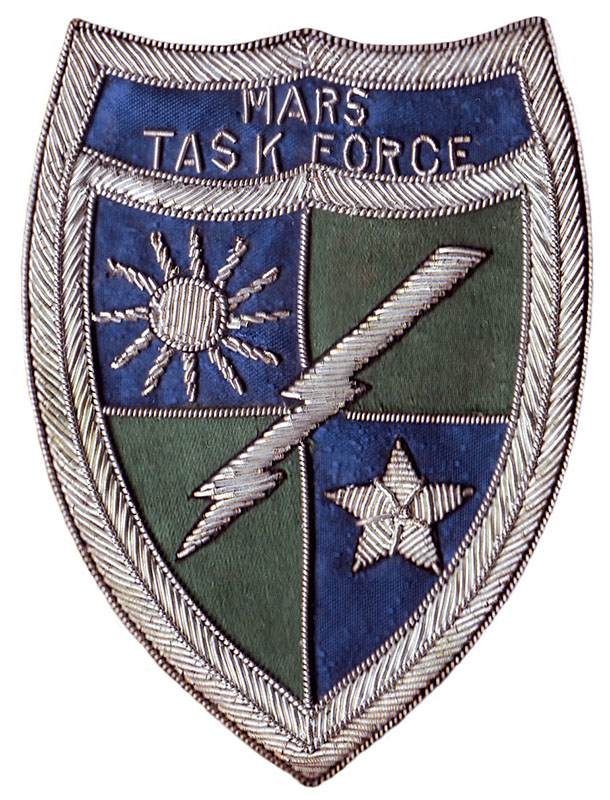
MARS Task Force shoulder sleeve insignia (SSI) worn by 124th Cavalry (Special) in Burma.

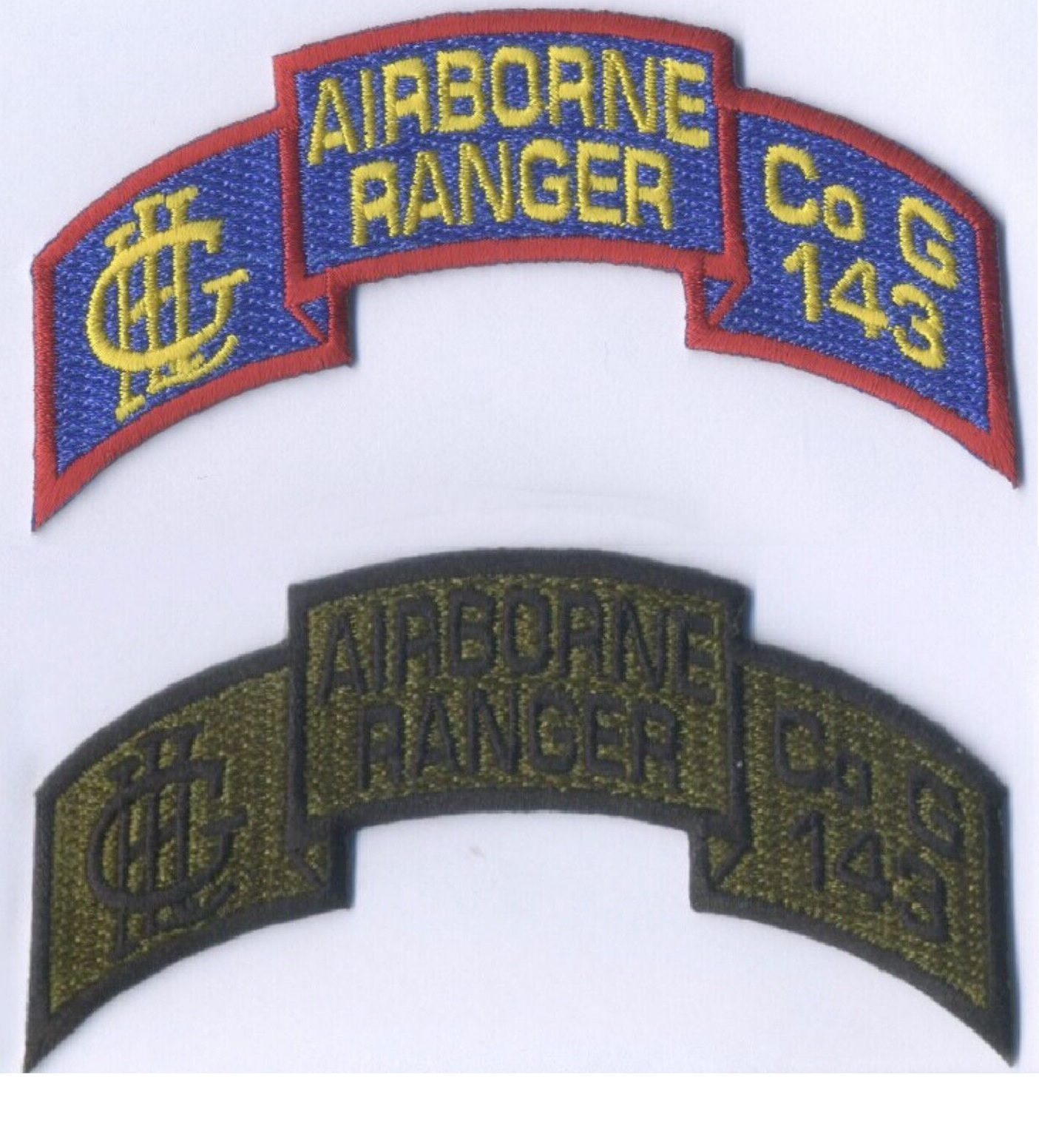
Ranger Company Scroll shoulder sleeve insignia (SSI) worn by the Rangers of G Co 143rd Infantry 1980-1987.

- (2010-2012) Southwest Border Task Force
- (1980-1987) Company G (Ranger), 143rd Infantry "Houston Light Guards", Houston, TX
- (1944-1945) 124th Cavalry (Special) "Marsmen", 5332rd Brigade (Provisional), Long Range Penetration(LRP), "MARS Task Force"

=== Texas Air National Guard ===
- (1996-2017) 181st Special Operations Weather Team, 136th Airlift Wing. Fort Worth, TX

== Training centers ==
- Special Warfare Training Detachment Airborne — Camp Bullis, Texas

== Special Forces Day ==
Special Forces Day is an annual memorial holiday on June 28 that "honors the men and women who have served in the special operations forces..to be regularly observed by appropriate ceremonies." It was established on May 16, 2023, during the Eighty-eighth Texas Legislature in House Bill 2499 sponsored by Cecil Bell and Brandon Creighton.

== Portrayal in media ==
- 2015: Texas Rising, a 10-hour miniseries based on the Texas Revolution. Depicts the Texas Rangers.

== See also ==
- Texas Task Force 1
- Texas Task Force 2
- Texas A&M Forest Service
- United States special operations forces
- List of military special forces units
- List of conflicts involving the Texas Military
- 71st Airborne Brigade
- 36th Airborne Brigade
