= 75th Infantry Regiment (Ranger) =

- Founded: 1969
- Country: United States
- Branch: United States Army
- Type: Light infantry
- Role: Vietnam War: LRRP; Post-Vietnam: Direct action; Irregular warfare; Long-range penetration; Special operations; Special reconnaissance
- Size: 15 companies (1969–74); 3 battalions (1974–86)
- Garrison/HQ: Fort Benning, Georgia (1984–86)
- Engagements: Vietnam War; Operation Eagle Claw; Invasion of Grenada

The 75th Infantry Regiment (Ranger) (officially 75th Infantry Regiment or 75th Infantry) was initially a parent regiment for all the US Army Ranger units during the Vietnam War and the early 1980s and then the headquarters for the Ranger battalions.

== History ==
On 1 February 1969, as part of the U.S. Army Combat Arms Regimental System (CARS), all U.S. Army Long Range Reconnaissance Patrol (LRRP) units were reorganized as the 75th Infantry Regiment (Ranger). Fifteen Ranger companies were formed from reconnaissance units in Europe and Vietnam with lineage to Merrill's Marauders (5307th Composite Unit). The firms were given the letters C through I and K through P. To avoid confusion with the similar "I" (or India) designation on typed documents, there was no "J" Ranger Company. Companies A and B were kept stateside as a strategic reserve in case they were needed overseas in Europe or the Americas.

The Ranger companies were composed of small, heavily armed long range reconnaissance teams that patrolled deep in enemy-held territory. Each independent company was attached to a separate division or brigade and acted as the eyes and ears of those units. Rangers collected intelligence, discovered enemy troop locations, surveilled trails and enemy hot spots, directed artillery and air strikes, performed bomb damage assessments, and conducted ambushes. Additionally, Rangers attempted to recover prisoners of war, capture enemy soldiers for interrogation, tap the wire communications of the North Vietnam Army and the National Liberation Front for South Vietnam (Vietcong) on the Ho Chi Minh trail, and mine enemy trails and roads.

== Lineage ==
- Organized as 5307th Composite Unit (Provisional) on 3 October 1943

Consolidated with the 475th Infantry and unit designated as 475th Infantry on 10 August 1944
Inactivated on 1 July 1945

- Redesignated as 75th Infantry on 21 June 1954

Allotted to the Regular Army on 26 October 1954
Activated on 20 November 1954
Inactivated on 21 March 1956

- Reorganized as a parent regiment under the Combat Arms Regimental System on 1 January 1969

Reorganized with Headquarters on 1 July 1984

- On 3 February 1986, the 75th Infantry Regiment (then consisting of Headquarters and Headquarters Company, 1st Ranger Battalion, 2nd Ranger Battalion, and 3rd Ranger Battalion) was consolidated with the former A Company, 1st Ranger Infantry Battalion (then part of HHC 7th SFG), Company A, 2nd Infantry Battalion (then part of HHC 10th SFG), and the inactive units Company A, 3rd Ranger Infantry Battalion (last part of HHC 13th SFG, inactivated in 1966), 4th Ranger Battalion, 5th Ranger Battalion and 6th Ranger Battalion; it was concurrently designated as 75th Ranger Regiment and reorganized under the Regimental System.

== Organization ==
=== Vietnam War ===
When they were redesignated on 1 February 1969, the average TOE strength of a Ranger company was of 3 officers and 115 enlisted men, bringing the total to 118 men divided into a company headquarters, operations section, communications platoon, and two patrol platoons.

There were some exceptions though; Company C, 75th Infantry (Ranger) had a strength of 230 men divided into a company Headquarters, operations section, communications platoon, and four patrol platoons.

Companies D and H each had 198 men and Companies M, N, O, and P each had 61 men, since these four units were created from LRP detachments assigned to brigades.

==== Ranger Companies ====
75th Infantry Regiment (Ranger)
Infantry (Ranger) Company	Activated on	Inactivated on	Previous LRP company	Subordinate to
Company A, 75th Infantry (Ranger)	1 February 1969	19 December 1974	Company D (LRP), 17th Infantry	V Corps (Germany)
Company B, 75th Infantry (Ranger)	1 February 1969	1 November 1974	Company C (LRP), 58th Infantry	VII Corps (Germany)
Company C, 75th Infantry (Ranger)	1 February 1969	25 October 1971	Company E (LRP), 20th Infantry	I Field Force (Vietnam)
Company D (Ranger), 151st Infantry; Company D, 75th Infantry (Ranger)	1 February 1969; 20 November 1969	20 November 1969; 10 April 1970	Company F (LRP), 51st Infantry	II Field Force (Vietnam)
Company E, 75th Infantry (Ranger)	1 February 1969; 1 October 1969	23 August 1969; 12 October 1970	Company E (LRP), 50th Infantry	9th Infantry Division (Vietnam)
Company F, 75th Infantry (Ranger)	1 February 1969	15 March 1971	Company F (LRP), 50th Infantry	25th Infantry Division (Vietnam)
Company G, 75th Infantry (Ranger)	1 February 1969	1 October 1971	Company E (LRP), 51st Infantry	23rd Infantry Division (Vietnam)
Company H, 75th Infantry (Ranger)	1 February 1969	15 August 1972	Company E (LRP), 52nd Infantry Regiment (drawn from the Cavalry Division LRRPs)	1st Cavalry Division (Vietnam)
Company I, 75th Infantry (Ranger)	1 February 1969	7 April 1970	Company F (LRP), 52nd Infantry	1st Infantry Division (Vietnam)
Company K, 75th Infantry (Ranger)	1 February 1969	10 December 1970	Company E (LRP), 58th Infantry	4th Infantry Division (Vietnam)
Company L, 75th Infantry (Ranger)	1 February 1969	25 December 1971	Company F (LRP), 58th Infantry	101st Airborne Division (Vietnam)
Company M, 75th Infantry (Ranger)	1 February 1969	12 October 1970	71st Infantry Detachment (LRP)	199th Infantry Brigade (Light) (Vietnam)
Company N, 75th Infantry (Ranger)	1 February 1969	25 August 1971	74th Infantry Detachment (LRP)	173rd Airborne Brigade (Vietnam)
Company O, 75th Infantry (Ranger); Company O (Arctic Ranger), 75th Infantry (Ranger)	1 February 1969; 4 August 1970	20 November 1969; 29 September 1972	78th Infantry Detachment (LRP)	3rd Brigade, 82nd Airborne Division (Vietnam); US Army Alaska
Company P, 75th Infantry (Ranger)	1 February 1969	31 August 1971	79th Infantry Detachment (LRP)	1st Brigade, 5th Infantry Division (Mech.) (Vietnam)

=== Post-Vietnam reorganization ===
==== Battalions ====
National Guard Ranger Companies

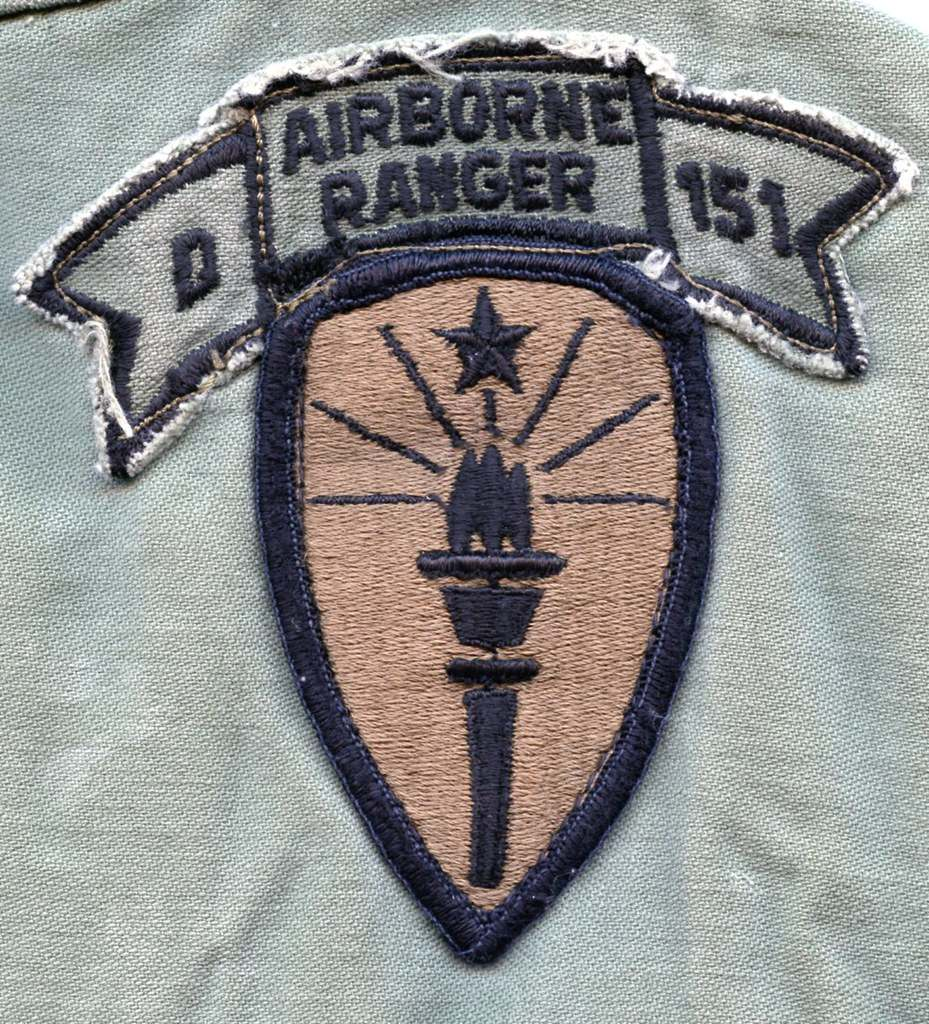
Ranger company scroll worn as shoulder sleeve insignia (SSI) by D co 151st Infantry (Ranger)

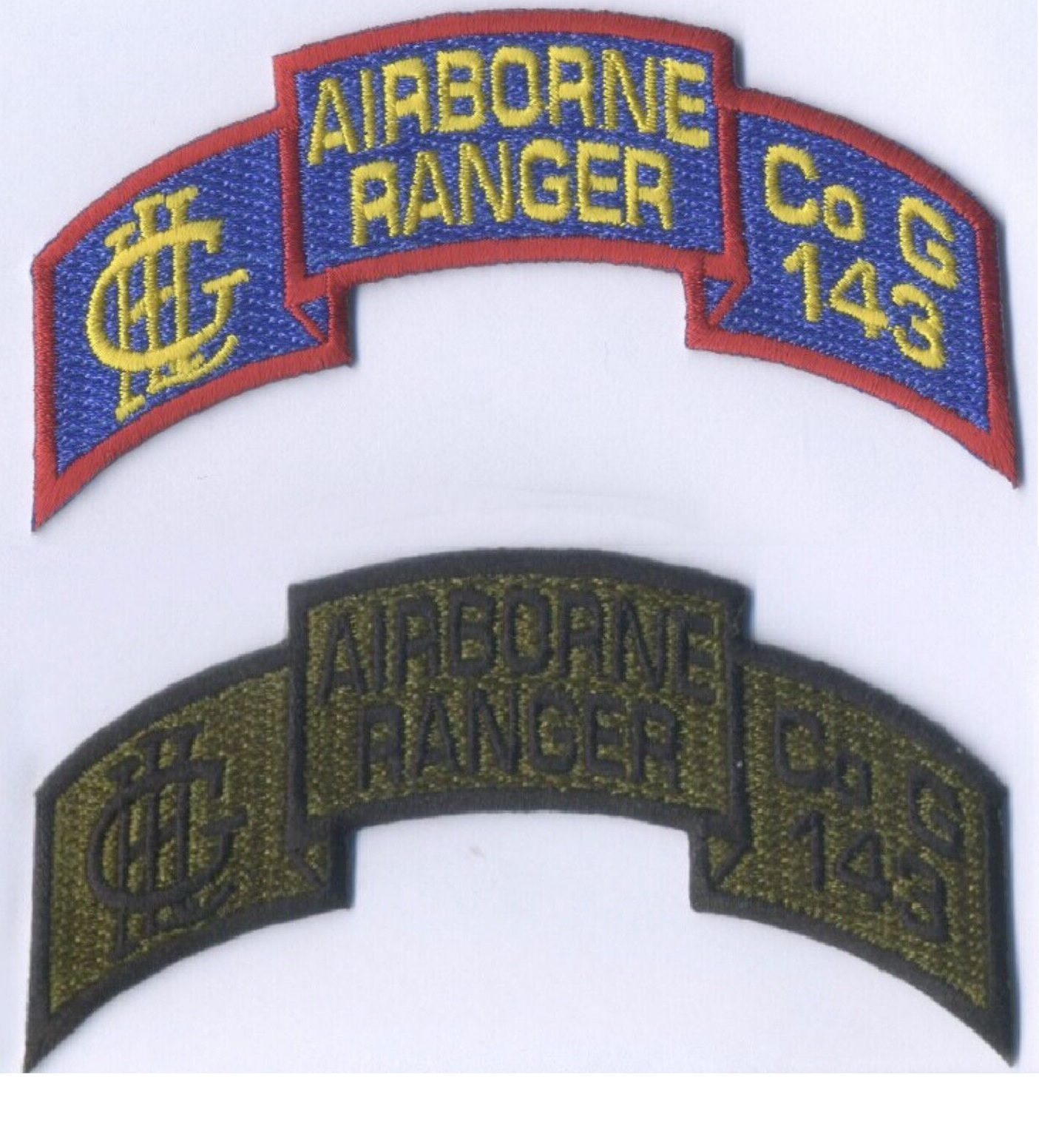
Ranger company scrolls worn as shoulder sleeve insignia (SSI) by G co 143rd Infantry (Ranger)

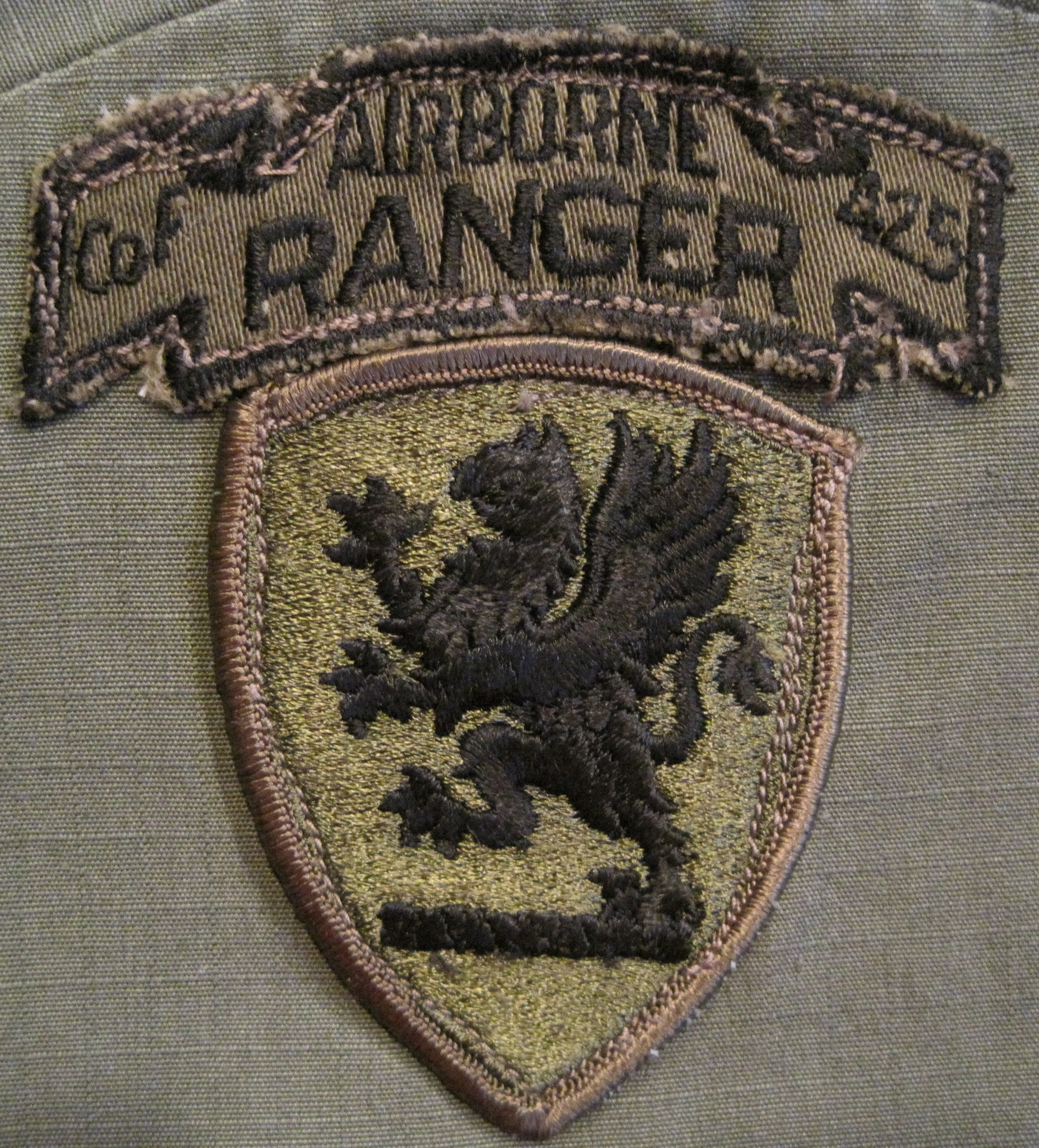
Ranger company scroll worn as shoulder sleeve insignia (SSI) by F co. 425th Infantry (Ranger)

Army National Guard Ranger Companies
Infantry (Ranger) Company	State	Activated on	Inactivated on
D Co, 151st Infantry (Ranger)	Indiana	1 December 1967	1 March 1977
E Co, 65th Infantry (Ranger)	Puerto Rico	1 April 1971	1 February 1980
F Co, 425th Infantry (Ranger)	Michigan	1 September 1972	1988
G Co, 143rd Infantry (Ranger)	Texas	1 April 1980	1 September 1987
H Co, 175th Infantry (Ranger)	Maryland		

== See also ==
- Company F, 425th Infantry (Ranger)
