= Thomas E. McCall =

United States Army soldier

Thomas Edward McCall
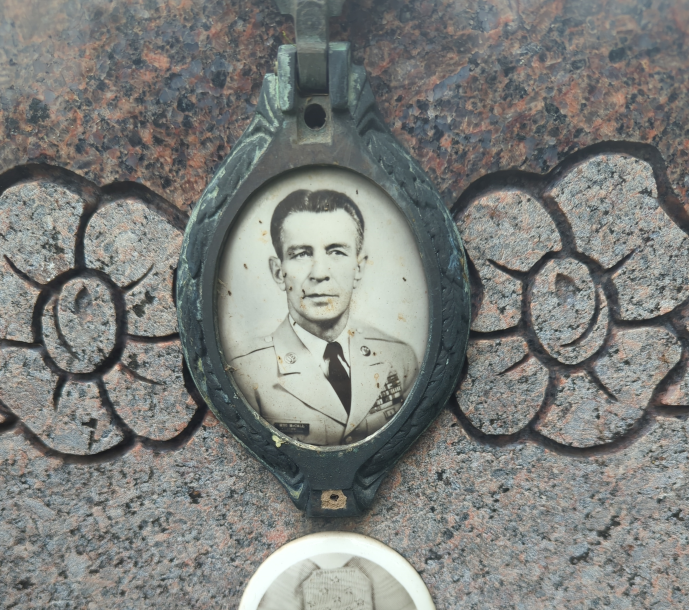
- Born: May 9, 1916; Burrton, Kansas, US
- Died: September 19, 1965 (aged 49); Washington, DC, US
- Burial place: Spring Vale Cemetery, Lafayette, Indiana
- Military career
- Allegiance: United States of America
- Branch: United States Army
- Rank: Master Sergeant
- Units: 143rd Infantry Regiment, 36th Infantry Division
- Conflicts: World War II: Battle of Monte Cassino Korean War
- Awards: Medal of Honor

Thomas Edward McCall (May 9, 1916 – September 19, 1965) was a United States Army soldier and a recipient of the United States military's highest decoration—the Medal of Honor—for his actions during the Battle of Monte Cassino in World War II.

== Biography ==
McCall joined the Army from Veedersburg, Indiana, and by January 22, 1944, was serving as a staff sergeant in Company F, 143rd Infantry Regiment, 36th Infantry Division. On that day, near San Angelo, Italy, he led his machine gun section in the crossing of the Gari River (erroneously identified as the Rapido) despite intense German fire. After all his men had been either killed or wounded, he single-handedly used his machine gun to destroy two enemy machine gun positions and charged a third before being captured by the Germans. For his actions, he was awarded the Medal of Honor the next year, on April 17, 1945.

McCall also served and was wounded in the Korean War, reaching the rank of Master Sergeant.

McCall died at age 49 and was buried in Spring Vale Cemetery, Lafayette, Indiana. He drowned while rescuing his 8-year-old son, Thomas.

== Medal of Honor citation ==
Staff Sergeant McCall's official Medal of Honor citation reads:

For conspicuous gallantry and intrepidity at risk of life above and beyond the call of duty. On 22 January 1944, Company F had the mission of crossing the Rapido River in the vicinity of San Angelo, Italy, and attacking the well-prepared German positions to the west. For the defense of these positions the enemy had prepared a network of machinegun positions covering the terrain to the front with a pattern of withering machinegun fire, and mortar and artillery positions zeroed in on the defilade areas. S/Sgt. McCall commanded a machinegun section that was to provide added fire support for the riflemen. Under cover of darkness, Company F advanced to the river crossing site and under intense enemy mortar, artillery, and machinegun fire crossed an ice-covered bridge which was continually the target for enemy fire. Many casualties occurred on reaching the west side of the river and reorganization was imperative. Exposing himself to the deadly enemy machinegun and small arms fire that swept over the flat terrain, S/Sgt. McCall, with unusual calmness, encouraged and welded his men into an effective fighting unit. He then led them forward across the muddy, exposed terrain. Skillfully he guided his men through a barbed-wire entanglement to reach a road where he personally placed the weapons of his two squads into positions of vantage, covering the battalion's front. A shell landed near one of the positions, wounding the gunner, killing the assistant gunner, and destroying the weapon. Even though enemy shells were falling dangerously near, S/Sgt. McCall crawled across the treacherous terrain and rendered first aid to the wounded man, dragging him into a position of cover with the help of another man. The gunners of the second machinegun had been wounded from the fragments of an enemy shell, leaving S/Sgt. McCall the only remaining member of his machinegun section. Displaying outstanding aggressiveness, he ran forward with the weapon on his hip, reaching a point 30 yards from the enemy, where he fired 2 bursts of fire into the nest, killing or wounding all of the crew and putting the gun out of action. A second machinegun now opened fire upon him and he rushed its position, firing his weapon from the hip, killing 4 of the guncrew. A third machinegun, 50 yards in rear of the first two, was delivering a tremendous volume of fire upon our troops. S/Sgt. McCall spotted its position and valiantly went toward it in the face of overwhelming enemy fire. He was last seen courageously moving forward on the enemy position, firing his machinegun from his hip. S/Sgt. McCall's intrepidity and unhesitating willingness to sacrifice his life exemplify the highest traditions of the Armed Forces.

== Awards and decorations ==

| Badge | Combat Infantryman Badge With star denoting 2nd award | | |
| 1st row | Medal of Honor | | |
| 2nd row | Silver Star | Bronze Star Medal | Purple Heart with 2 Oak leaf clusters |
| 3rd row | Army Commendation Medal | Prisoner of War Medal | Army Good Conduct Medal with three Good conduct loops |
| 4th row | American Defense Service Medal | American Campaign Medal | European-African-Middle Eastern Campaign Medal with 2 Campaign stars |
| 5th row | World War II Victory Medal | Army of Occupation Medal with 'Germany' clasp and Berlin Airlift Device | National Defense Service Medal |
| 6th row | Korean Service Medal with 1 Campaign star | United Nations Service Medal Korea | Korean War Service Medal |
| Unit awards | Korean Presidential Unit Citation | | |

== See also ==
- List of Medal of Honor recipients
- List of Medal of Honor recipients for World War II
