= 51st Infantry Division (United States) =

- 51st Infantry Division shoulder sleeve insignia
- Active: 1946–63
- Country: United States
- Branch: United States Army
- Type: Infantry
- Size: Division
- Nickname: Rattlesnake Division

The 51st Infantry Division was an infantry division of the United States Army, composed of units from the Florida National Guard and the South Carolina National Guard.

== History ==
Original Organization Date: 11 September 1946 with headquarters at Tampa, Florida. In the post-World War II restructuring of the National Guard a number of new divisions were organized. Among these was the 51st Infantry Division, composed of National Guardsmen from Florida and South Carolina.

As of September 1946, the 51st Division included:

Unit	Headquartered	Commander
Division Headquarters	Tampa, Florida	Maj. Gen. Sumter de Leon Lowry Jr.
211th Infantry Regiment	Miami, Florida	Col. Robert A. Ballard
116th Field Artillery Battalion	Tampa, Florida	Lt. Col. George N. Sagin
51st Infantry Division Band	Miami, Florida	

A reorganization of the Army National Guard took place following World War II. As part of this effort, the new 51st Infantry Division was allocated to the states of Florida and South Carolina. The division was activated on 5 July 1946 as a standard triangular division. Old and new units were assigned and activated during 1946 and 1947.

In 1949, the 107th Antiaircraft Artillery Battalion and 263rd Tank Battalion were assigned to the division. The Division remained in a normal National Guard training status, being reorganized periodically as the Army applied lessons learned in World War II and the Korean War. The 51st Infantry Division never served on active federal duty.

In 1959, the division was reorganized as a pentomic division.

As the result of another major reorganization of the National Guard, the division was inactivated on 1 April 1963. Subordinate units were reorganized and reassigned. Division Headquarters and Headquarters Company was redesignated as Headquarters, 51st Command Headquarters (Divisional), South Carolina National Guard.
