= 36th Airborne Brigade (United States) =

Authorized 36th Infantry Brigade (Airborne) shoulder sleeve insignia

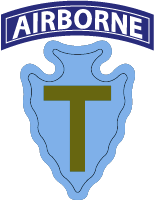
As worn 36th Airborne Brigade shoulder sleeve insignia

The 36th Airborne Brigade was an airborne brigade of the United States Army and the Texas Army National Guard. The brigade was active from 1 November 1973 to 1 April 1980. The unit's lineage continues today in the 36th Infantry Division.

A 36th Brigade of infantry was originally part of the National Army 18th Division, formed briefly in 1917–18.

The Texas Army National Guard had previously had the 71st Airborne Brigade, an ARNG sister unit to the Regular Army's 173d Airborne Brigade that was very similar in structure. Following the 173d's inactivation in 1972, the 71st Airborne Brigade was inactivated in 1973. Two Airborne infantry battalions previously assigned to the 71st were retained, and the HQ 36th Airborne Brigade was activated as a Table of Distribution and Allowances (TDA) unit to provide administrative command and control over the two battalions.

The two battalions assigned to the 36th Airborne Brigade were:

Unit	Beret Flash
36th Airborne Bridge HQ including a Pathfinder Detachment	
1st Battalion (Airborne), 143d Infantry	
2nd Battalion (Airborne), 143d Infantry	

McGrath says the 36th Brigade insignia with star was authorized for wear from 10 May 1967 – 1 November 1973, but never worn, because the brigade at the time was designated 71st Airborne Brigade. The unit continued to wear the patch of the 71st Airborne Brigade until the unit was inactivated. The 36th Airborne Brigade was active from 1973 to 1980 when it too was inactivated. One battalion was converted to an engineer battalion and the other to an armored cavalry squadron; however, Company A, 2-143d was reorganized as Company G (Ranger), 143d Infantry. The company was based on the LRRP model of the Vietnam War years and later replaced "Ranger" with "Long Range Surveillance" when the Army adopted the new LRS designation. Under the 71st and 36th, unit soldiers has worn a blue Airborne tab, but this was replaced with a G co Ranger Scroll in G-143d while it was a Ranger Company, and later returned to a blue Airborne tab when it was a LRS company. The company remained active until its inactivation in September 2001.

When HQ 36th Airborne Brigade was inactivated, its pathfinder detachment was retained as the separate 1136th Infantry Detachment (Pathfinder) in Austin, attached to G-143d for administration and training. By September 1990 it was inactivated, along with all other National Guard and Army Reserve pathfinder units.

The 36th was reconstituted as a divisional formation (36th Brigade, 50th Armored Division) from 1988–92. From 6 January 1988, the 7th and 8th Battalions of the 112th Armor, along with other support units in the “Texas Brigade,” served in the 50th Armored Division of the New Jersey National Guard. Reorganization in 1993 ended the relationship with the 50th and saw the inactivation of the 7th and 8th Battalions. According to Aumiller, the two battalions were relieved from assignment from the 50th Armored Division by 9 January 1993. During that year the 50th was inactivated in an ARNG force reduction that saw the merger of the understrength 50th Armored Division, 26th Infantry Division, and 42d Infantry Division. The 42d Division survived, while the 50th and 26th were reduced to brigades of the 42d.

1st Battalion, 133d Field Artillery may have been the Direct Support battalion (effectively the brigade's artillery battalion) for the 36th Brigade from 1989.

In 1992 it became the 36th Brigade of the 49th Armored Division based at Houston, TX. It seems likely to have been activated in 1992, and was definitely an active reserve (TPU) unit from Aug 1994 thru at least Feb 1997. It was likely transitioned during the May 2004 realignment when the 49th Armored Division became the 36th Infantry Division.
