= 211th Infantry Regiment (United States) =

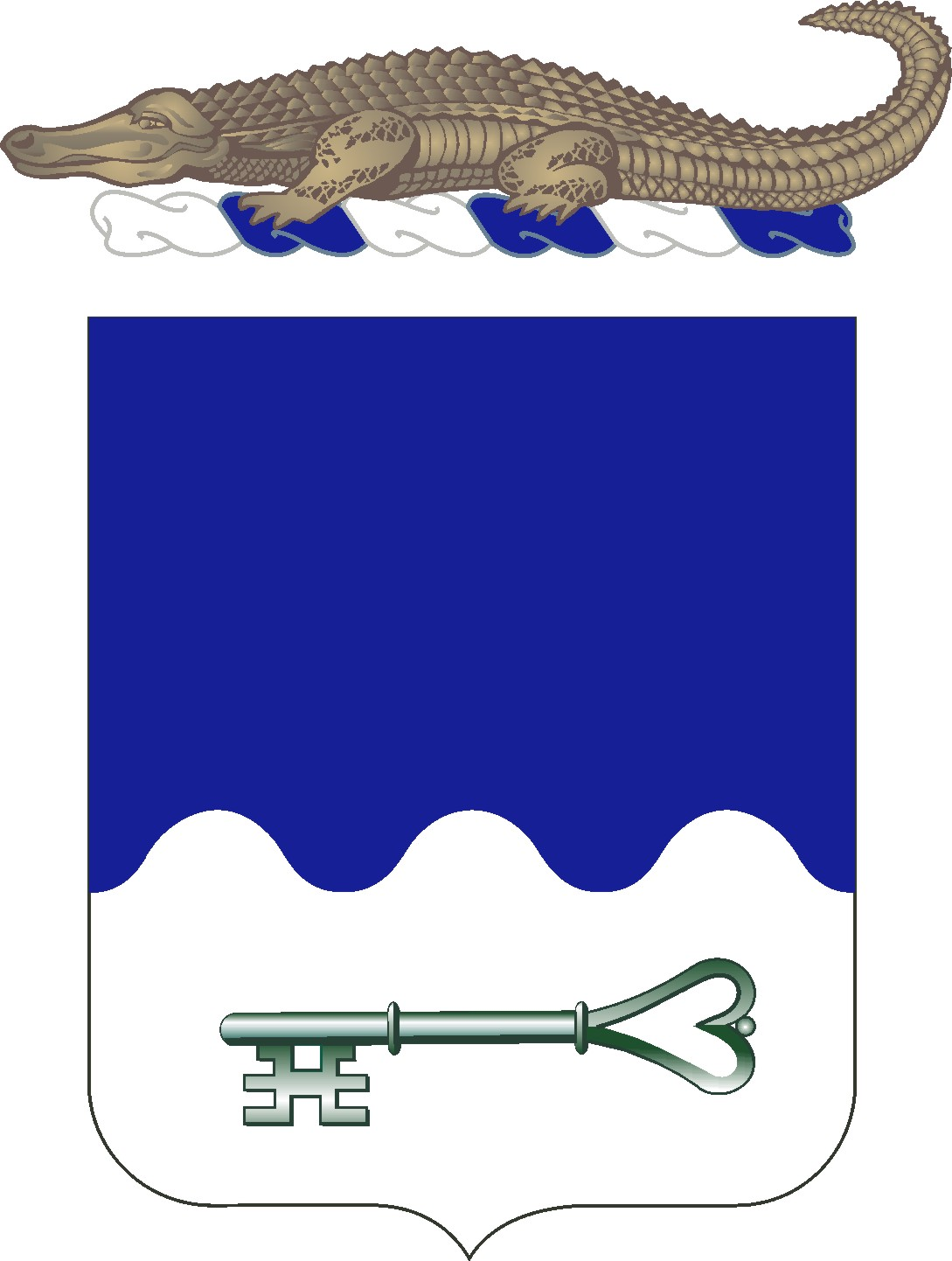
- Coat of arms
- Active: 1946–1963
- Country: United States
- Branch: Florida Army National Guard
- Type: Light infantry
- Motto: "Paroneri" meaning "Equal to the Task"

Insignia
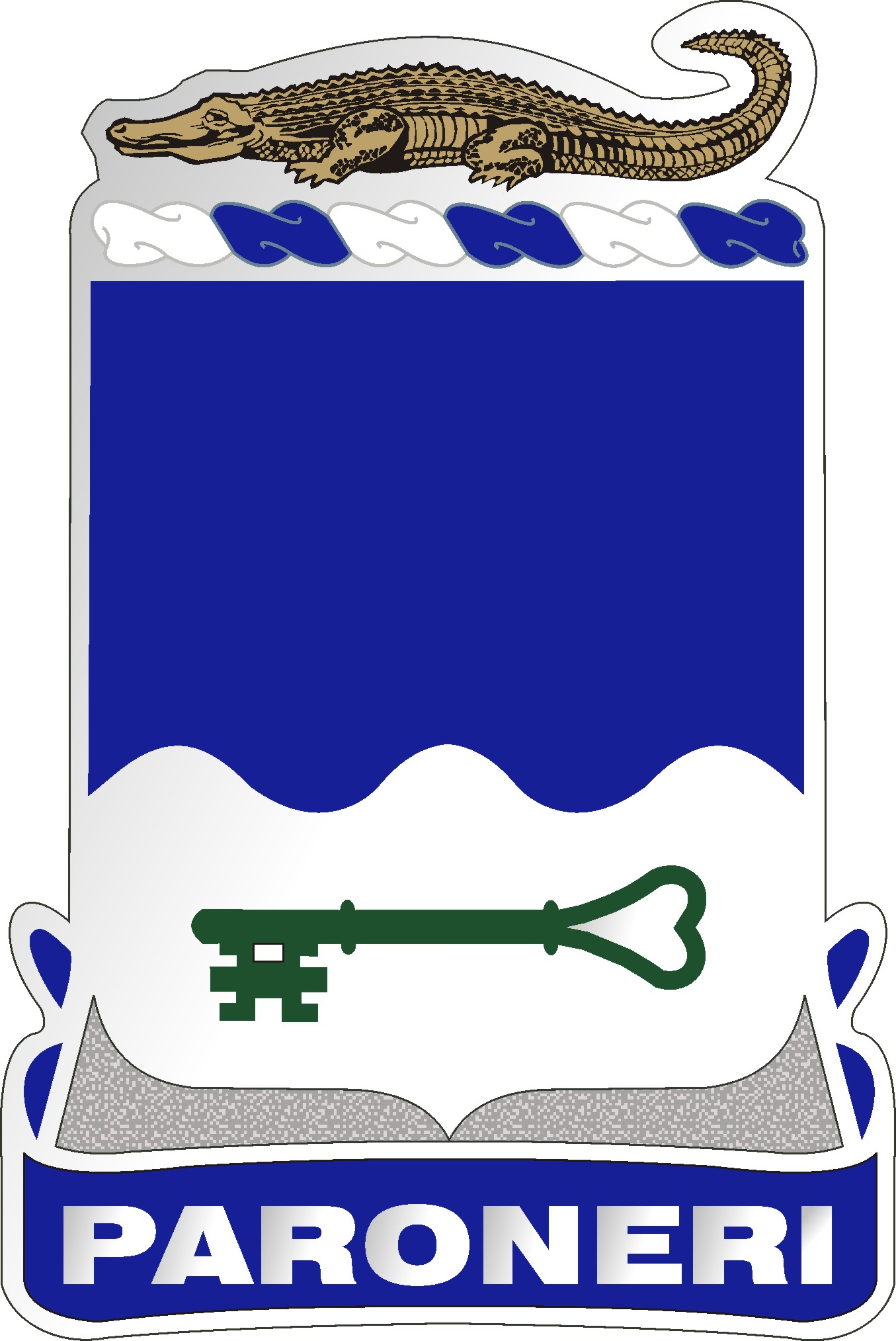
- Distinctive unit insignia

The 211th Infantry Regiment was an infantry regiment of the Florida Army National Guard. The regiment was active during the Cold War era as part of the 51st Infantry Division. The regiment's headquarters was in Miami.

The 211th Infantry performed their first annual field training at Fort Jackson from July 4 to 18, 1948 as part of the 51st Infantry Division. Companies C and G were ordered into State Active Duty to aid civil authorities in hurricane relief. Lieutenant Roland Fisher commanded Company G (3 officers and 83 soldiers) during the relief operation in Fort Lauderdale from October 5 to November 15, 1948. Captain Richard H. Coburn commanded Company C (3 officers and 48 soldiers) during relief operations from October 5 to 7, 1948.

The Pentomic reorganization of 1959 broke up the 211th Infantry Regiment and it was perpetuated by the 1st and 2nd Battalions of the 211th Infantry of the 51st Infantry Division until their elimination in 1963 under the Reorganization Objective Army Division reorganization. The heraldry of the regiment was transferred to the Florida Army National Guard training school, the 211th Regiment (Regional Training Institute) on 21 May 1997.

== Organization in 1948 ==
Headquarters	Company	Station
211 Infantry Regiment	Headquarters	Miami, Florida
	Service Company	Miami, Florida
	Heavy Mortar Company	Tampa, Florida
	Heavy Tank Company	Palmetto, Florida
	Medical Company	St. Petersburg, Florida
1st Battalion, 211th Infantry Regiment	Headquarters & Headquarters Company	Miami, Florida
	Company A, 1–211 IN	Miami Springs, Florida
	Company B, 1–211 IN	Coral Gables, Florida
	Company C, 1–211 IN	Hollywood, Florida
	Company D, 1–211 IN	Homestead, Florida
2nd Battalion, 211th Infantry Regiment	Headquarters & Headquarters Company	West Palm Beach, Florida
	Company E, 2–211 IN	Belle Glade, Florida
	Company F, 2–211 IN	West Palm Beach, Florida
	Company G, 2–211 IN	Fort Lauderdale, Florida
	Company H, 2–211 IN	Fort Pierce, Florida
3rd Battalion, 211th Infantry Regiment	Headquarters & Headquarters Company	St. Petersburg, Florida
	Company I, 3–211 IN	St. Petersburg, Florida
	Company K, 3–211 IN	Clearwater, Florida
	Company L, 3–211 IN	Bradenton, Florida
	Company M, 3–211 IN	Sarasota, Florida

The 211th Infantry conducted annual training at Fort Jackson July 3 to 17, 1949 and August 13 to 27, 1950 with the 51st Infantry Division. The regiment was again partially called on for hurricane relief. Second battalion headquarters and portions of Companies G and H (altogether totalling 9 officers and 153 soldiers) conducted relief operations in West Palm Beach, Fort Pierce, Hollywood, and Fort Lauderdale areas from August 26 to September 1, 1949. Company K (4 officers and 52 soldiers) under command of Captain Richard Woodring aided in hurricane relief to Tarpon Springs-Clearwater area on September 6 to 7, 1950. Company C (5 officers and 46 soldiers) under command of Lieutenant Elby H. Cross aided in hurricane relief from October 18 to 20, 1950.

The 211th Infantry conducted Annual Training at Fort McClellan, Alabama, from July 29 to August 12, 1951, and Company I was awarded The Adjutant General's Trophy for 1951.

The regiment conducted Annual Training from June 15 to 29, 1952, July 26 to August 9, 1953, July 4 to 18, 1954, and from June 6 to 23, 1957 at Fort McClellan.

== Commanders ==
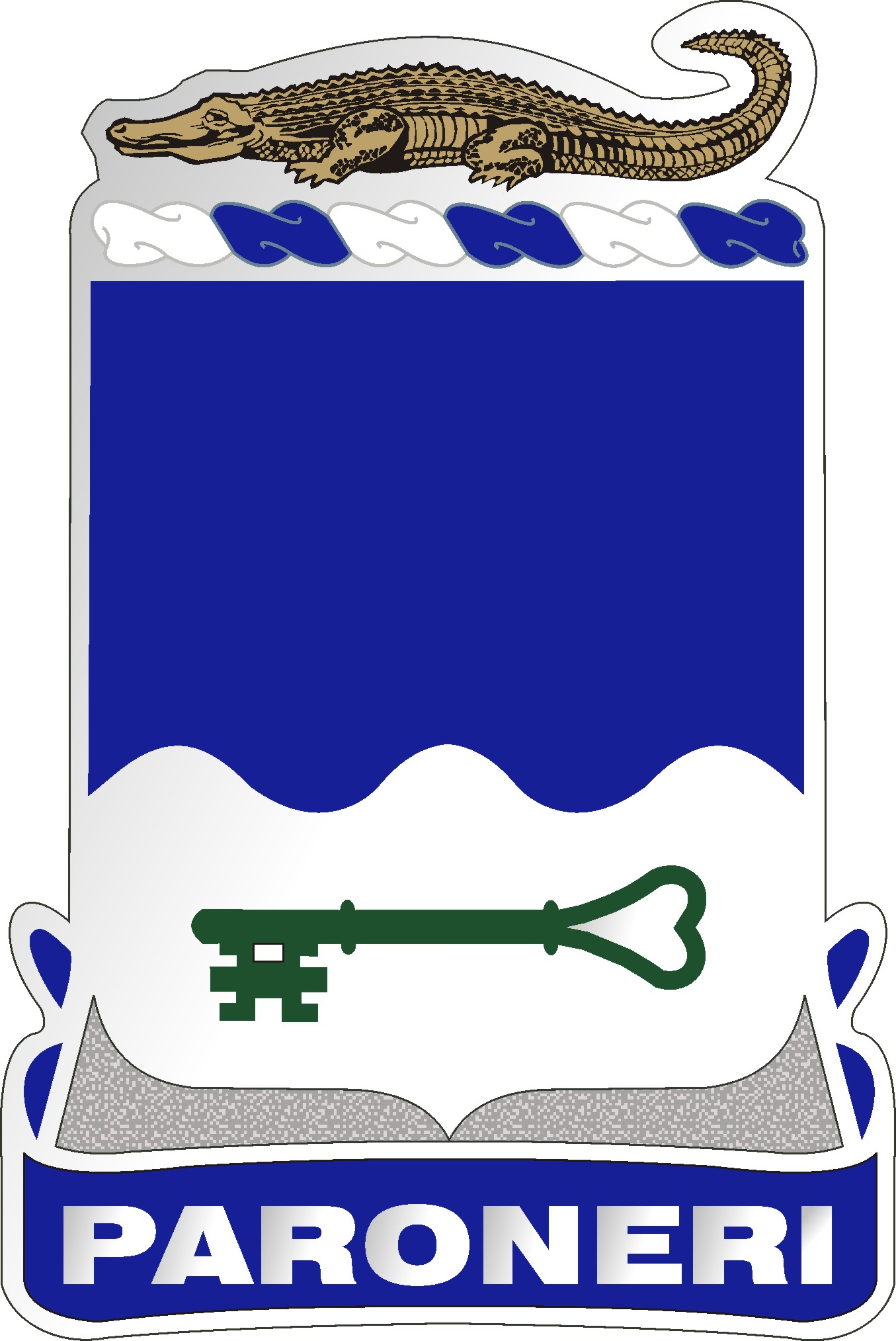
COL Robert A. Ballard, 211th Infantry Regiment, 1947 -

== See also ==
- 51st Infantry Division
- 53rd Infantry Brigade Combat team
- 124th Infantry Regiment (United States)
- 48th Armored Division
