= 71st Airborne Brigade =

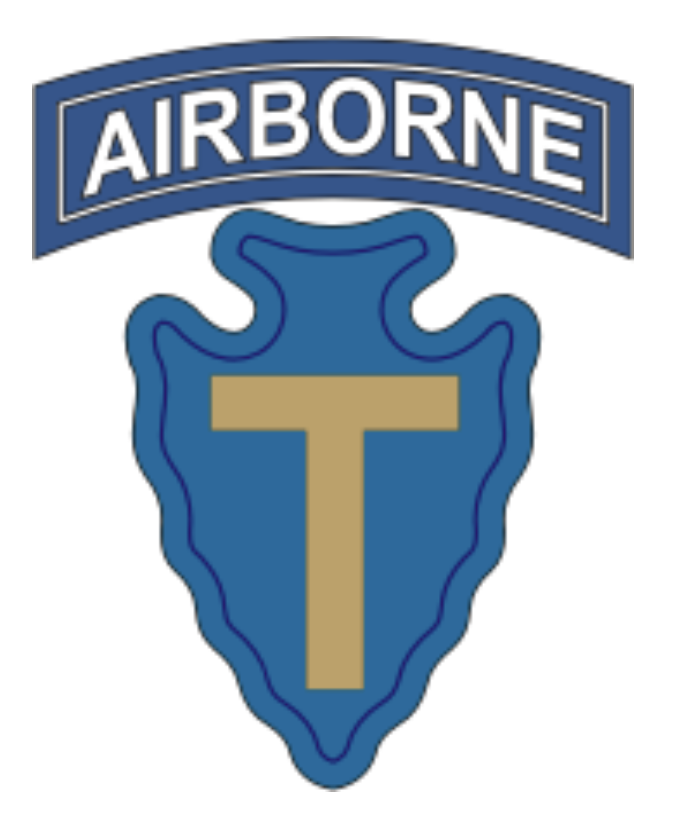
- Active: 15 December 1967 - 1 November 1973
- Country: United States
- Allegiance: Texas
- Branch: Army National Guard
- Type: Airborne Infantry
- Size: Brigade
- Garrison/HQ: Houston, Texas

The 71st Airborne Brigade was an airborne brigade of the United States Army and the Texas Army National Guard.

It was a result of the National Guard total force reorganization to fill the gap and improve in National Guard airborne infantry capabilities from the consolidations of 1st Battalion (Airborne) 151st Infantry into D & E co (LRP) 151st Infantry of the Indiana National Guard on 1 December 1967 and consolidations of the 1st Battalion (Airborne) 225th Infantry into E & F co (LRP) 425th Infantry of the Michigan National Guard on 1 February 1968.

The previous 71st Infantry Brigade of the 36th Infantry Division was active during World War I, when it had the 141st and 142nd Infantry Regiments, along with the 132nd Machine Gun Battalion, assigned.

Headquarters, 36th Infantry Division, was reorganized and redesignated on 15 January 1968 as Headquarters, 71st Airborne Brigade; its location was concurrently changed to Houston.

The 71st Airborne Brigade was active from 15 December 1967 until 1 November 1973.

The 71st Airborne Brigade consisted of three airborne infantry battalions:

- 1st Battalion (Airborne), 143d Infantry
- 2nd Battalion (Airborne), 143d Infantry
- 3rd Battalion (Airborne), 143d Infantry

These infantry battalions were supported by an airborne field artillery unit headquartered in Port Arthur, Texas:

- 1st Battalion (Airborne), 133d Field Artillery

The 71st Airborne Brigade (separate) and its successor 36th Airborne Brigade reinforced the 82nd Airborne Division as a 4th Brigade. All 3,300 troopers of the 71st Brigade were authorized to be jump-qualified. On 1 November 1973, the brigade was inactivated and a reduced number of its personnel and amount of equipment were used to activate the 36th Airborne Brigade, a TDA headquarters. The brigade only had two battalions: 1-143d and 2-143d. On 1 April 1980 the brigade was inactivated and the two battalions were reorganized and reflagged as other types of units. Company A of 2-143d formed Company G (Ranger), 143d Infantry, a corps-level LRRP unit (later LRS) that remained active until 2001.

The brigade was reorganized and redesignated 1 June 1988 in the Texas Army National Guard as Headquarters, 36th Brigade, 50th Armored Division; concurrently, consolidated with Headquarters Company, 386th Engineer Battalion, and consolidated unit designated as Headquarters and Headquarters Company, 36th Brigade, 50th Armored Division.
