= 143rd Infantry Regiment (United States) =

- Coat of arms
- Active: Constituted 15 October 1917; Restructured 16 March 1959; Reorganized 1 March 1963; Inactivated 12 August 2001; Reactivated 1 September 2010–present
- Country: USA
- Branch: United States Army
- Type: Infantry
- Role: Airborne infantry
- Garrison/HQ: 1st Battalion – Texas
- Nickname: Third Texas
- Motto: Arms Secure Peace
- Engagements: Spanish–American War; Mexican Border Service; World War I World War II; War in Afghanistan (2001-2021)

Commanders
- Notable commanders: Paul D. Adams; Charles J. Denholm; Irving J. Phillipson

Insignia
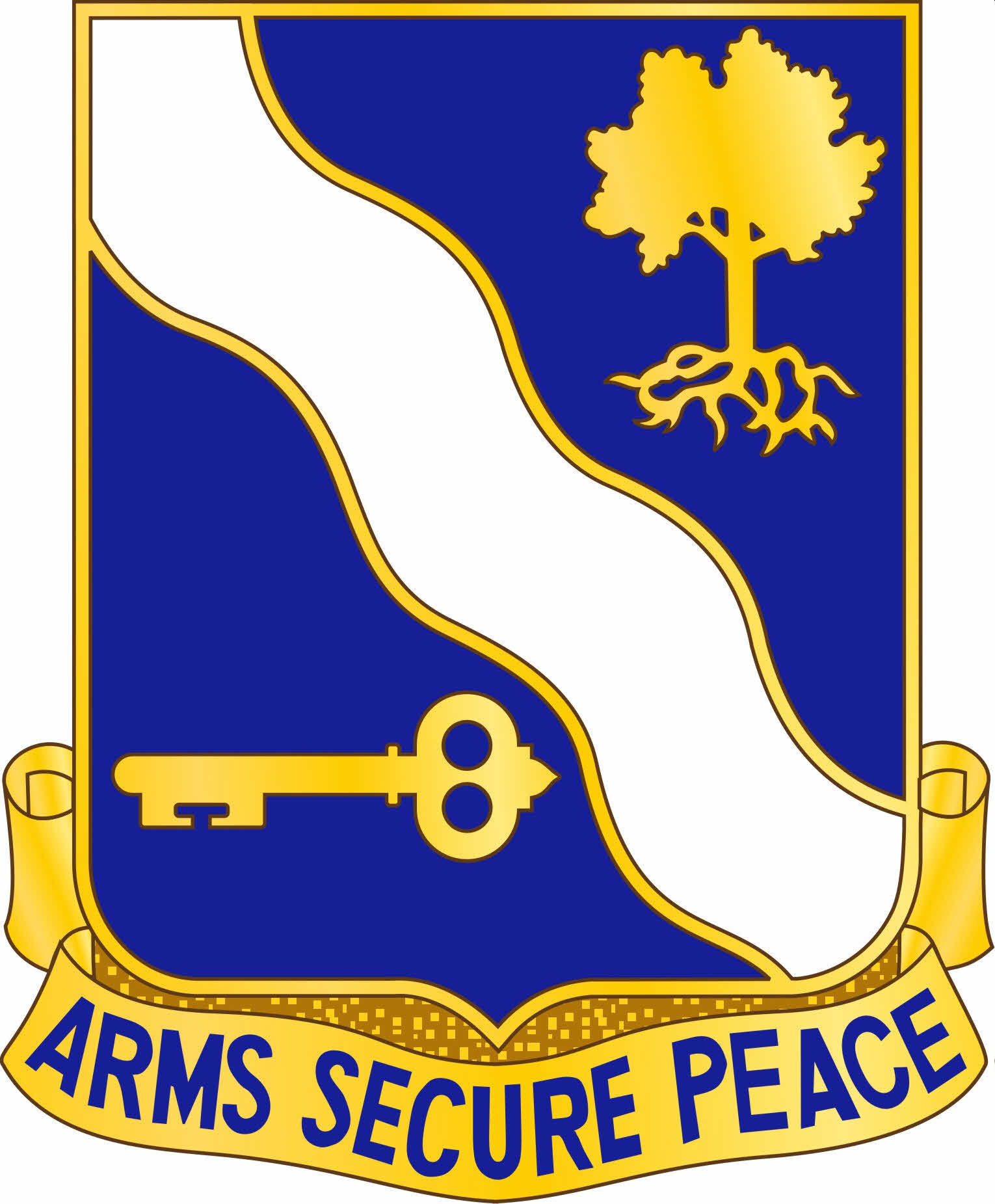
- Distinctive unit insignia

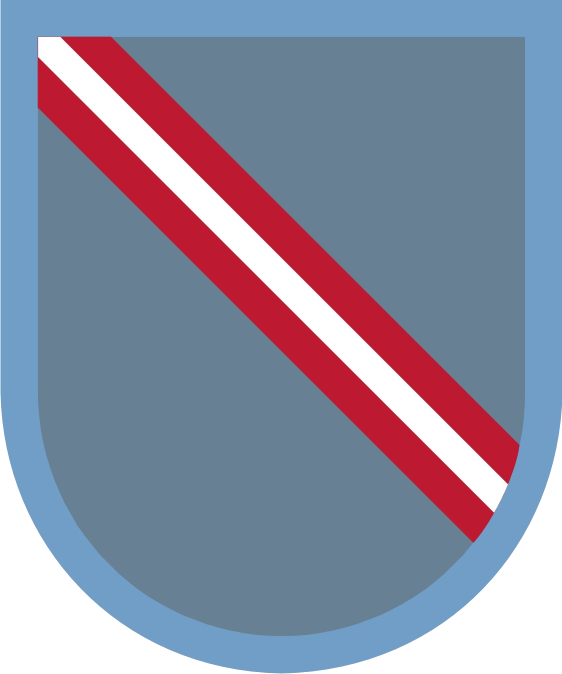
- Beret flash of 1st Battalion

The 143rd Infantry Regiment (Third Texas) is an airborne infantry formation in the Army National Guard and has one battalion active under the Texas Army National Guard.

== Service ==
=== Mexican Border Service ===
In February 1913, Mexico was in a state of turmoil between two rival factions for power and this prevented commanders in Mexican border towns from paying their soldiers. Concern over this caused County Judge and Sheriff of Cameron County, Texas, to appeal to the governor for assistance. In response, Governor Oscar Colquitt sent Texas militia, consisting of two companies of the Third Texas Infantry from Corpus Christi and Houston and two companies of cavalry. They remained until June 1913. The situation got worse, with American citizens being executed in Mexico and various factions conducting cross-border raids into Texas. Some Federal troops were stationed on the border and in August 1913, Colquitt sent the entire Third Texas Infantry to Fort Brown along with a battery of light artillery from Dallas. These were relieved by Federal troops in 1914. By 1916, the Third Texas was stationed at Harlingen while in Federal service.

=== World War I ===
In 1917, the 36th Infantry Division was formed from units in Texas and Oklahoma. The Third Texas and part of the Fifth Texas infantry regiments were organized as the 143d Infantry Regiment at Camp Bowie, Texas. The 143d was assigned to the 72d Infantry Brigade of the division. The 143d was then shipped to France in 1918 with the rest of the division for final combat training and then to the front. In September 1918, the 36th Division was attached to the French Fifth Army. Under the command of Irving J. Phillipson, the regiment participated in Meuse-Argonne Offensive from 7–28 October 1918.

=== Interwar period ===
The 143rd Infantry arrived at the port of Newport News, Virginia on 2 June 1919 on the troopship USS Finland and was demobilized on 3 July 1919 at Camp Travis, San Antonio, Texas. Per the National Defense Act of 1920, it was reconstituted in the National Guard on 3 December 1920, assigned to the 36th Division, and allotted to the state of Texas. The regiment was further assigned to the 72nd Infantry Brigade and allotted to the southeast quadrant of the state for reorganization. The regimental headquarters was reorganized and federally recognized on 21 July 1922 at Taylor, Texas. The headquarters was successively relocated to Houston in 1923 and to Waco on 6 February 1931. The regiment, or elements thereof, was called up to perform the following state duties: riot control during a workers’ strike on the Missouri–Kansas–Texas Railroad at Denison, Texas, in 1923; flood relief duties along the Brazos River at Waco in September 1936. Conducted annual summer training most years at Camp Mabry, Austin, Texas, from 1922–25, and Camp Hulen, Palacios, Texas, from 1926–39.

Armories of the regiment in 1940

=== World War II ===
The 36th Infantry Division, including the 143rd Infantry, was mobilized on 25 November 1940, and moved to Camp Bowie, where it arrived on 5 January 1941. It was shipped to Algeria in early 1943.

==== Salerno & Liri Valley, Italy ====
The 143d participated in the landing at Salerno, Italy and continued to fight in Italy during the campaign in the Liri Valley from September 1943 to early 1944. Significant engagements included the Battle of San Pietro and the Rapido River crossing.

==== Anzio ====
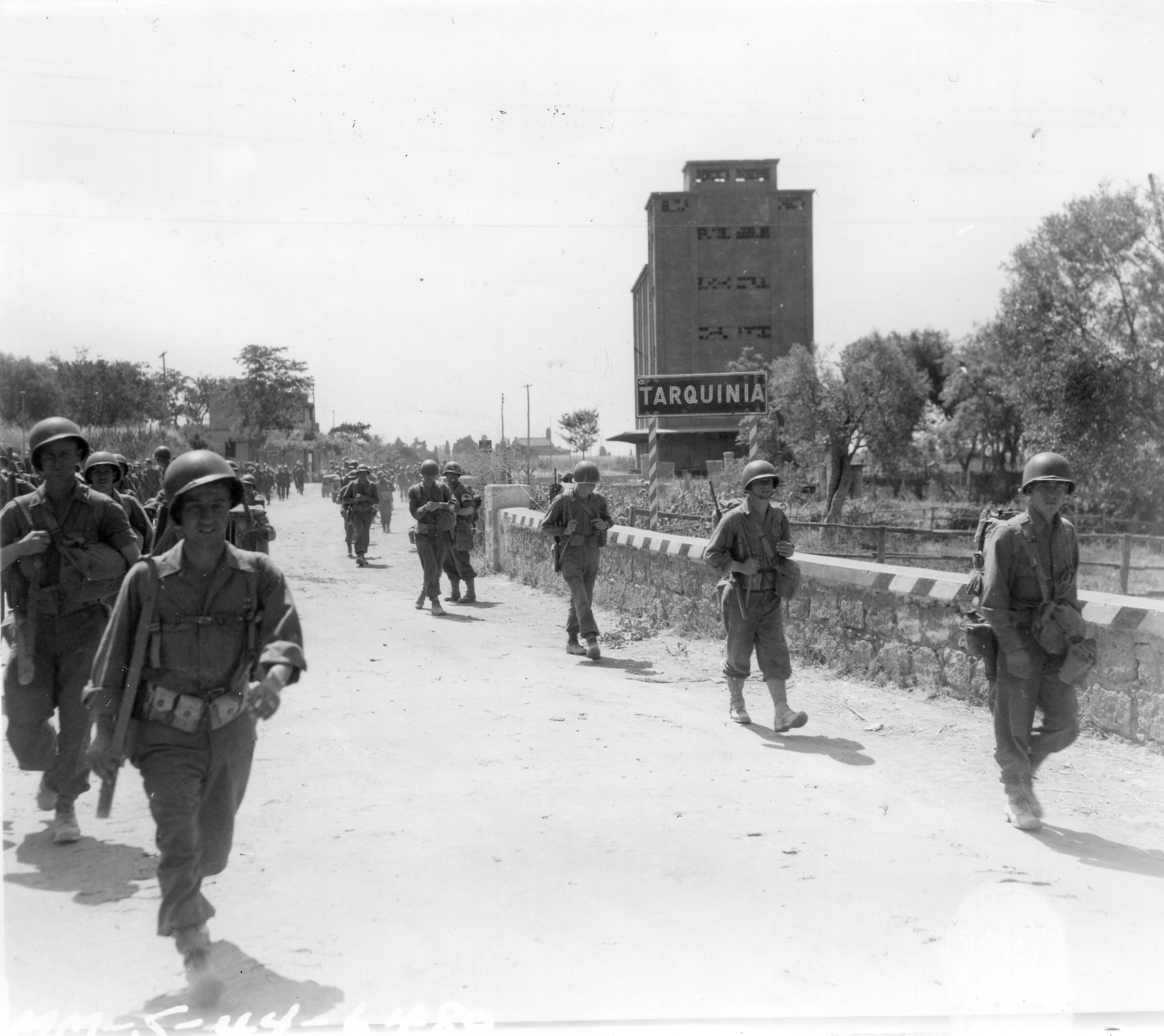
Troops of the 143rd Infantry Regiment, marching out of Tarquinia, Italy, 9 June 1944

The regiment, now commanded by Colonel Paul D. Adams, was landed to reinforce the Fifth Army on 19 May 1944. It then participated in the breakout and movement to Rome where they were halted by orders to allow other units to catch up.

==== Southern France ====
As part of the 36th Division, the 143d landed in Southern France in August 1944. The 22, the IIIrd Battalion releases Grenoble "Capital of the Alps". Moving forward with the 141st Infantry, the regiment was part of the bottleneck that formed the Colmar Pocket. This resulted in the destruction of the German 19th Army.

==== Vosges, France and Germany ====
The 143d concluded its combat with actions in Vosges, France and southern Germany. There was a significant battle near Weikersheim, Germany. The regiment then breached the Siegfried Line and moved forward as far as the Rhine river.

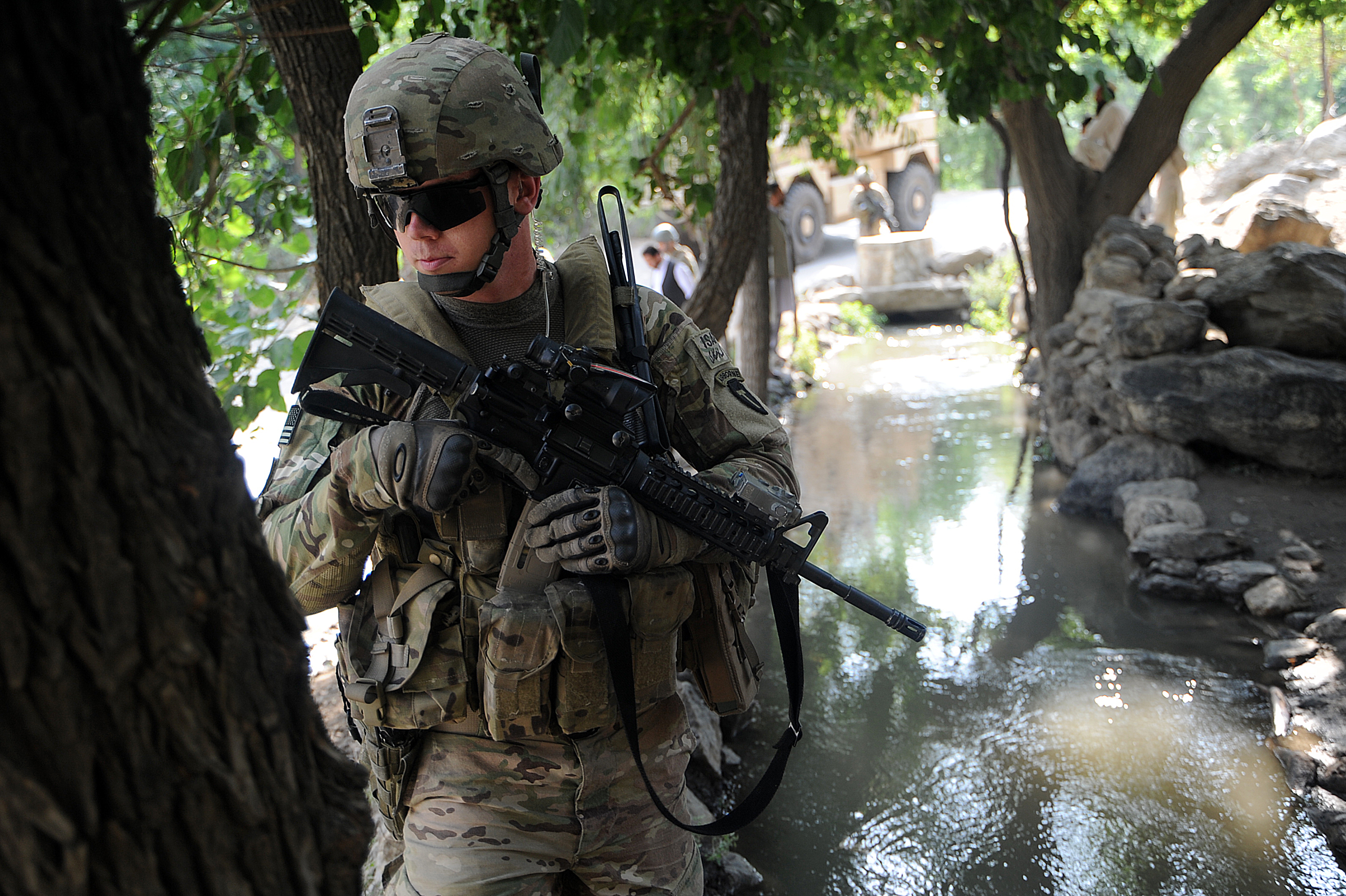
Sgt. Timothy Stewart, with Alpha Company, 1st Battalion, 143rd Infantry Regiment provides security along the Whatapur Canal in Kunar Province, Afghanistan, July 10, 2012

=== Afghanistan ===
The 143d was mobilized the day after Thanksgiving in 2011. It conducted mobilization training at Camp Atterbury, Indiana, and deployed to Afghanistan in February 2012. The primary mission of the 143d was service as security forces for Provincial Reconstruction Teams (PRTs) throughout the country. Headquarters and Headquarters Company was assigned to the capital city, Kabul, helping to secure and manage the operation of multiple bases in the area.

=== War on Drugs/Southern Border Operations ===
The 143rd's LRS teams participated in southern border operations on active duty as part of Texas Task Force 1, Operation Unity, and Operation Plus-Up. The 143rd also rapidly responded to the call for Operation Lone Star, a controversial and ongoing border security mission. The 143rd spearheaded the major plus up in October, 2021. Within two weeks of the initial call to orders, nearly the entire battalion would be on the border and conducting operations.

=== Kosovo 2023 ===
In April, 2023 HHC 1-143rd INF (A) deployed to Kosovo in support of Operation Joint Guardian as part of the Kosovo Force (KFOR) mission, in accordance with United Nations Security Council Resolution 1244. The force was split between a security forces (SECFOR) company, stationed in the north, a Liaison Monitoring Team (LMT) company station in the south, and HHC being stationed near the capital, Pristina. The main goal of the SECFOR's mission was ensure the Safe and Secure Environment and Freedom of Movement of all people within the border of Kosovo, doing so by conducting presence patrols and assisting both Kosovo Security Force (KSF) and Kosovo Police (KP). The LMTs had a similar overall mission, but were more focused on community outreach. Known as the finger on the pulse of Kosovo, the LMTs were there to be a part of the community and report back on atmospherics and trends. During the time of the unit's deployment, SECFOR would respond to a large shooting in the northwest region of the country. In the south, there were instances of violent crime, rioting and protests that the LMTs responded to. The LMTs, both the American and the partner forces, are arguably the decisive operation the majority of the time. Their feedback and reporting reaches the highest levels of KFOR and the Institutions of Kosovo having the biggest impact on the mission as a whole.

== Heraldic information ==
=== Coat of arms ===
==== Blazon ====
- Shield: Azure, a bend wavy argent between an oak tree eradicated and a key fesswise or.
- Crest: On a wreath of the colors argent and azure a mullet argent encircled by a garland of live oak and olive proper.
- Motto: Arms Secure Peace

==== Symbolism ====
1. The shield is blue for infantry, while the bend wavy represents the regiment's service on the Mexican border, along the Rio Grande; iIt also represents the Aisne River in France, where the unit served in World War I. The oak tree symbolizes the Meuse-Argonne operation, also in World War I, while the gold key represents service in the Spanish–American War.

==== Background ====
- The coat of arms was approved on 30 June 1926

== Lineage and honors ==
=== Lineage ===
- Organized 15 October 1917 in Camp Bowie, Texas, from the Third Texas Infantry and the Fifth Texas Infantry and assigned to the 72d Infantry Brigade, 36th Infantry Division
- Called to federal service, October 1917
- Returned to state control, June 1919
- Activated (state) for hurricane disaster relief, Nueces, San Patricio and Aransas Counties, September 1919
- Activated (state) for the New London School explosion, March 1937
- Mobilized (federal) at Brownwood, Texas, 25 November 1940
- Inactivated at Camp Patrick Henry, Virginia, 22 December 1945
- Reactivated under state control and assigned to the 36th Infantry Division, 23 October 1946
- Reorganized as 1st and 2d Battle Groups, 143d Infantry (under the Pentomic Division system), 1959
- Reorganized as the 143d Infantry, 1 March 1963, with the 2d and 3d Battalions assigned to the 3d Brigade, 36th Division; and the 1st Battalion inactivated
- 3d Battalion relieved from assignment to the 36th Division and assigned to the 36th Infantry Brigade (Separate), 1 November 1965
- 1st Battalion reactivated, 2d Battalion relieved from assignment to the 36th Division, 3d Battalion relieved from assignment to 36th Infantry Brigade (Separate)15 Dec 1967; all battalions assigned to the 71st Airborne Brigade (Separate), 30 July 1968
- 1st and 2d Battalions assigned to the 36th Airborne Brigade (redesignated from the 71st); 3d Battalion inactivated and its personnel and equipment used to form the 1st Squadron, 124th Cavalry Regiment in 1973
- 1st Battalion inactivated, 2d Battalion inactivated (less company A); assets from Company A, 2nd Battalion, 143d Infantry used to form Company G (Ranger) 143d Infantry, 21 April 1980.
- Company G (Ranger) 143d Infantry was redesignated as Company G (Long Range Surveillance), 143d Infantry in 1988.
- Company G (Long Range Surveillance), 143d Infantry, a corps-level unit, was inactivated in September 2001; the division-level 143d Infantry Detachment (Long Range Surveillance), a separate unit with no lineage connection to the 143d Infantry Regiment, remained active.
- 143d Infantry Detachment (LRS) was inactivated in 2008; personnel and equipment were used to form Troop C (LRS), 3d Squadron, 124th Cavalry Regiment of the 71st Battlefield Surveillance Brigade.
- 1st Battalion activated as 1st Battalion (Airborne), 143d Infantry Regiment, 2010. HHC, Company A, Company D, and Forward Support Company (FSC) activated in Texas; Company B activated in the Alaska Army National Guard; Company C activated in the Rhode Island Army National Guard from the personnel and equipment of the 173d Infantry Detachment (LRS). In 2016 Company B was inactivated and reflagged as a unit of the 1st Battalion, 297th Infantry Regiment, AK ARNG.
- In 2017, the Battalion was assigned under the 173rd IBCT (A) as part of the Associated Unit Pilot to establish a precedent of using Reserve Component units to plus up low density Active Component units. The AUP ended in 2020, however, the 173rd retained control of the 143rd until their deployment to Kosovo in 2023. They have since been released back to full control of the Texas Military Department.

The lineage of subordinate units is as follows:

- Headquarters Company, 143d Infantry Regiment (Waco)
- Heavy Mortar Company (Clifton)
- Medical Company (Houston)
- Service Company (Houston)
- Tank Company (Marlin)
- Headquarters Company, 1st Battalion (College Station) – First formed in Clifton 6 June 1922 as part of the 141st Infantry. Transferred to the 143d Infantry 1924. World War II. "ALSACE" Distinguished Unit Streamer. Reformed in Palestine, Texas, on 12 May 1947; moved to College Station 10 January 1954.
- Company A (Rusk) – Originally formed as Company A, Seventh Cavalry (Confederate Army); Rusk Militia 1883–1895; Company F, Third Texas Infantry 1903–1914; World War II. "ALSACE" Distinguished Unit Streamer.
- Company B (Mexia) – Originally formed as Company B, Third Infantry, Texas Volunteer Guard, 1879; Company C, Second Texas, United States Volunteers (Spanish–American War); Mexican Border Service, 1916–1917; World War II. "ALSACE" Streamer.
- Company C (Beaumont) – Organized in 1926; World War II. "ALSACE" Streamer. Stationed in Palestine, Texas 1947.
- Company D (Corsicana) – Independent Blues Militia, 1859; Company K, First Texas Cavalry (Confederate Army); Company A, First Texas, United States Volunteers (Spanish–American War); World War II. "ALSACE" Distinguished Unit Streamer.
- Headquarters Company, 2d Battalion (Houston) – Originally formed in Moody, then moved to Hillsboro 18 February 1930. World War II. "COLMAR POCKET" Distinguished Unit Streamer. Reorganized in Houston, 2 December 1946.
- Company E (Caldwell) – Organized in 1939; assault unit at Salerno, Rapido River. "COLMAR POCKET" Streamer. Reorganized in Baytown, 1947.
- Company F (Huntsville) – Formed from volunteers in Hood's Brigade (Confederate Army) and the Tom Hamilton Guards of the 1870s. Company F, First Texas, United States Volunteers (Spanish–American War). World War II. "COLMAR POCKET" Distinguished Unit Streamer.
- Company G (Houston) – Formed from the Houston Light Guard. World War II. "COLMAR POCKET" Streamer. Reorganized into Company G (Ranger), 143d Infantry in 1980. Redesignated G co 143rd Infantry LRS in 1987
- Company H (Beaumont) – First formed 22 February 1922 in Somerville. World War II. "COLMAR POCKET" Streamer. Reorganized and activated 3 October 1947 in Beaumont.
- Headquarters Company, 3rd Battalion (Waco) – First formed in Itasca as Company K, 143d Infantry in 1922. Redesignated as Headquarters Company, 3d Battalion in 1924. World War II. "MAGRANON RIDGE," and "RIBBEAUVILLE" Distinguished Unit Streamers. Reformed in Waco on 5 February 1947.
- Company I (Belton) – Formed from the Miller Rifles (later Belton Rifles), 1886.
- Company K (Waco) – Formed as the Waco Greys, 1876. Company K, Second Texas Infantry, 1898. World War II. "MAGRANON RIDGE," "RIBBEAUVILLE," and "BITSCHOFFEN" Distinguished Unit Streamers. Pfc. Donald K. Kimbrough was awarded a Presidential Citation for Heroism, Gallantry in Action and Outstanding Achievement in Company K on 15 March 1945. Company K was assigned the mission of attacking at night over exposed terrain, to capture the town of Bitschoffen, France. The town was well defended and surrounded by extensive minefields. Company K attacked twice, each time suffering heavy losses from mines and defensive fires, though each time, reorganized for another assault. On the third assault, elements of the company attacking up and through a mine field succeeded in entering the town, overwhelming the German troops in the village. They then attacked from the rear, and engaged those enemy forces with the remainder of Company K. By dawn, Bittschoffen, France had fallen, an undetermined number of the enemy was killed and 66 prisoners were captured. Pfc. Donald K. Kimbrough retired from the Armed Forces as Master Sgt. in 1946.
- Company L (Hillsboro) – Originally Company M, Second Texas Infantry, 1900. World War II. "RIBBEAUVILLE" and "MAGRANON RIDGE" Distinguished Unit Streamers.
- Company M (Waco) – First formed in Killeen 1922, moved to Waco 1 July 1931. World War II. "RIBBEAUVILLE" and "MAGRANON RIDGE" Distinguished Unit Streamers.

=== Honors ===
==== Campaign participation credit ====
- Mexican Border Service:
- World War I:

1. Meuse-Argonne

- World War II:

1. Naples-Foggia with Arrowhead;
2. Anzio;
3. Rome-Arno;
4. Southern France with Arrowhead (Liberation of Alps, Grenoble)
5. Rhineland;
6. Ardennes-Alsace;
7. Central Europe

- Global War on Terror:

1. Afghanistan

==== Unit decorations ====
- Presidential Unit Citation (Army) for:

1. 2–6 December 1944 (3d Battalion and Cannon Company) – COLMAR POCKET
2. 6–9 December 1944 (2d Battalion) – COLMAR POCKET
3. 26–29 August 1944 (3d Battalion) – SOUTHERN FRANCE
4. 15 March 1945 (Company K, 2d Battalion) – CENTRAL EUROPE
5. 15–17 March 1945 (1st Battalion) – CENTRAL EUROPE

- French Croix de Guerre with Palm for:

1. Vosges

- Meritorious Unit Commendation for:

1. Italy, 1943
2. Italy-France, 1944
3. 8 December 2011 – 1 October 2012 (Detachment, 1st Battalion, 143rd Infantry Regiment) – AFGHANISTAN

=== Notable individual awards/commendations ===
==== Medal of Honor ====
- Corporal Charles E. Kelly, Company L, 3d Battalion, was awarded the Medal of Honor for actions near Altavilla, Italy on 13 September 1943 during World War II.
- Staff Sergeant Thomas E. McCall, Company F, 2d Battalion, was awarded the Medal of Honor for actions near San Angelo, Italy on 13 September 1943 during the Rapido River crossing in World War II.
- Technical Sergeant Stephen R. Gregg, Company L, 3d Battalion, was awarded the Medal of Honor for actions near Montélimar, France on 27 August 1944 during World War II.

==== Distinguished Service Cross ====
The following unit members were awarded the Distinguished Service Cross:

- Sergeant Jack G. Berry, September, 1943.
- Private First Class Charles E. Wheeler, September, 1943.
- Private First Class Robert E. Watson, Company C, 1st Battalion, 8 December 1943. San Pietro, Italy.
- Private First Class Chester M. Dotson, Company I, 2d Battalion, 9 December 1943.
- Sergeant Robert L. Chudej, Company D, 1st Battalion, 13 December 1943.
- Private First Class Romeo A. Leclair, 21 January 1944.
- Second Lieutenant Thomas E. Vierheller, 22 January 1944.
- Major James Frank Skells, 3d Battalion, 12 February 1944.
- Private First Class Morgan R. Tompkins, Company F, 2d Battalion, 28 May 1944.
- First Lieutenant Melvin Richard Clemens, 29 August 1944.
- Private First Class Elmer E. Kopp, Company F, 2d Battalion, 29 September 1944.
- Sergeant Edwin G. Masching, 4 October 1944.
- Staff Sergeant Charley A. Holm, Company I, 2d Battalion, 20 November 1944.
- Captain Eric C. Anderson, Company G, 2d Battalion, 22 November 1944.
- First Lieutenant Richard J. Grousset, Company G, 2d Battalion, 22 November 1944.
- First Sergeant Charles W. Holecek, Company C, 1st Battalion, 6 December 1944.
- Sergeant Charles E. Hickman, Company M, 3d Battalion, 7 December 1944.
- Technical Sergeant John J. Wehling, Cannon Company, 8 December 1944.
- Staff Sergeant Hec Kilrea, Combany K, 2d Battalion, 12 December 1944.
- Corporal John Kotkovetz, Anti-Tank Company, 12 December 1944.
- Private First Class Charles Sciortino, Anti-Tank Company, 12 December 1944.
- Private First Class Wayne H. Brooks, Company L, 3d Battalion, 13–14 December 1944.
- Private First Class Gerald S. Gordon, Company L, 3d Battalion, 13–14 December 1944.
- Staff Sergeant David G. Blewett, Company A, 1st Battalion, 14 December 1944.
- Private First Class Rudolph J. Szafraniec, Company M, 3d Battalion, 15 December 1944.
- Private Donald N. Winters, Company M, 3d Battalion, 15 December 1945.
- Sergeant Gurney R. Shields, Company G, 2d Battalion, 17 December 1944.
- Sergeant Thomas A. Voltero, Company G, 2d Battalion, 17–18 December 1944.
- Private First Class Santo J. DiSalvo, Company G, 2d Battalion, 18 December 1944.
- Sergeant Paul W. Oligny, Company C, 1st Battalion, 18 December 1944.
- Lieutenant Colonel Marion P. Bowden, 2d Battalion, 19–21 January 1945.
- First Lieutenant Elmer S. Ward, 2–3 February 1945.
- Staff Sergeant Albert V. Martinez, Company F, 2d Battalion, 10 February 1945.
- Private Theodore F. Reynolds, Company C, 1st Battalion, 10–11 February 1945.
- Sergeant Michael Antosky, Company K, 2d Battalion, 15 March 1945.
- Private First Class Charles H. Sinclair, Company L, 3d Battalion, 15 March 1945.
- First Lieutenant Malcolm G. Smith Jr., 15 March 1945.
- Private First Class Charles E. Hooker, Company F, 2d Battalion, 16 March 1945.
- Captain Kermit H. Selvig, Company C, 1st Battalion, 22 March 1945.
- First Lieutenant Garland B. Taylor, 23 March 1945.
