= Houston Light Guard =

Militia company

- Houston Light Guard Armory
- U.S. National Register of Historic Places
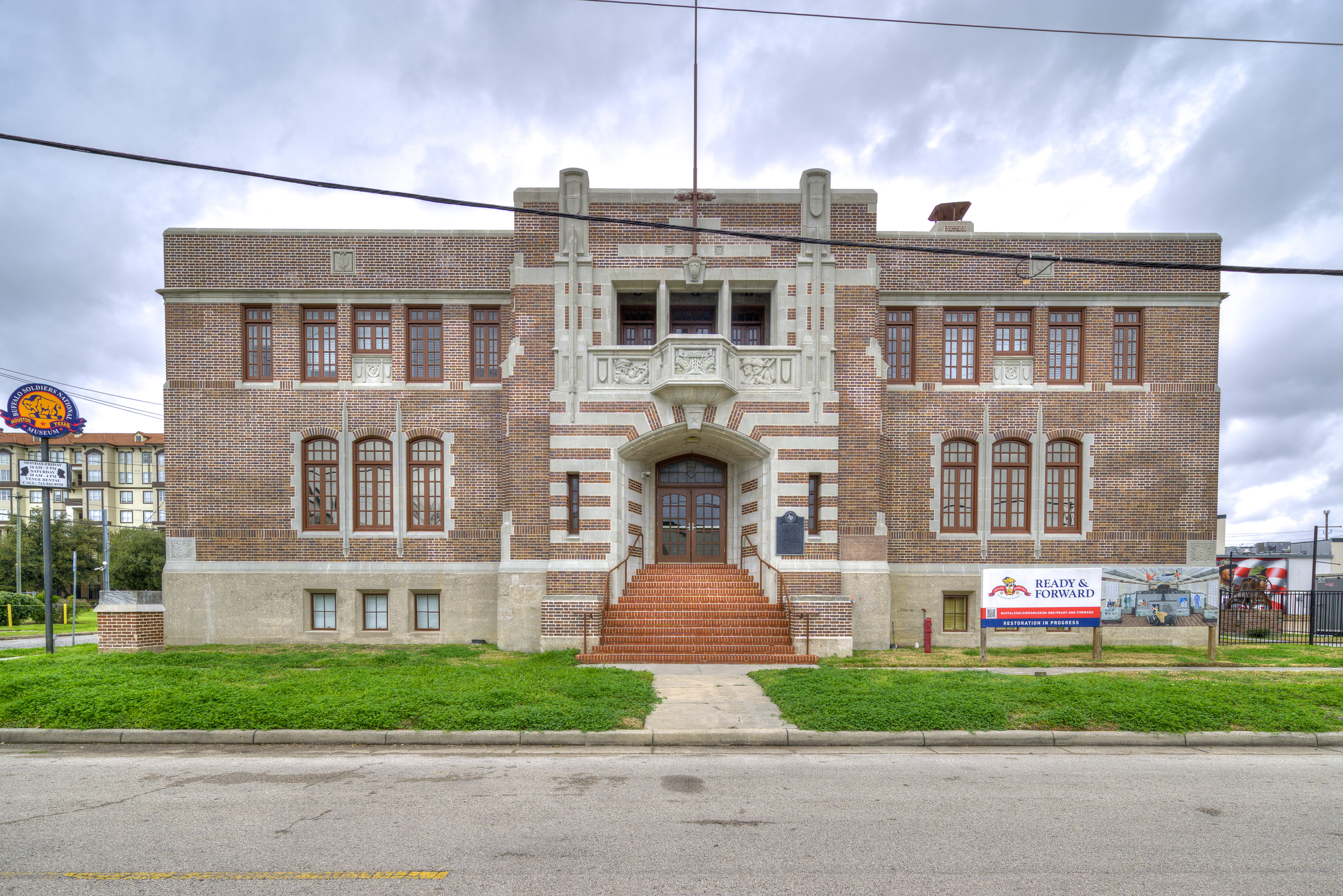
- The building is home to the Buffalo Soldiers National Museum
- Location: 3820 Caroline Street, Houston
- Coordinates: 29.7358°N 95.3779°W
- Area: 23,000 square feet (2,100 m^{2})
- Built: 1925
- Architect: Alfred C. Finn
- Architectural style: Late Renaissance Neo-Gothic
- NRHP reference No.: 100009738
- Added to NRHP: 4 January, 2024

The Houston Light Guard was one of the oldest militia companies founded in Texas. Founded in 1873, it served as Company G of the 143rd Infantry Regiment during both World Wars and later as A co 2nd Battalion, 143rd Infantry after the Pentomic division system. It was a part of the National Guard's only Airborne Infantry Brigades, was a Ranger Company, and a Long Range Surveillance Company. The Houston Light Guard moniker is an official US Army special designation.

== Armory ==
The original Houston Light Guard Armory was located on Texas St. and Fannin Ave. It designed by architect George Dickey and built in 1893 using cash prizes won by the Houston Light Guard in National drill competitions. In 1925 it was sold and the proceeds were used to build a new armory on Caroline St. The building was designed in 1925 by Alfred C. Finn, a local Houston architect. The privately owned property was denied a tax exemption causing the Houston Light Guard Association a financial burden for over the years before being transferred to the Texas National Guard in 1938, making it the first state owned armory in Texas. In 1991 the Houston Light Guards moved to Ellington Field and the property was purchased by Houston Community College to be repurposed as a library, but instead sat for decades in disrepair. Hopes were high when the Houston Hispanic Forum attempted to repurpose the property into a community center in early 2000. They approached the City of Houston's community development department to purchase the armory and offered to lease it from City. In late 2000 the city purchased the property and approved the lease; however, the Houston Hispanic Forum could not live up the city's agreement of raising $3 Million for renovations and the Armory continued to sit in decay. Then in 2008 the Buffalo Soldiers National Museum, founded in 2000 and originally located on 1834 Southmore Blvd, began raising funds to purchase the Caroline St. Armory, and In November 2012 the armory became home to the nations largest repository of African-American Military History.

It was designated a Recorded Texas Historic Landmark in 1992 and added to the National Register of Historic Places in 2024.

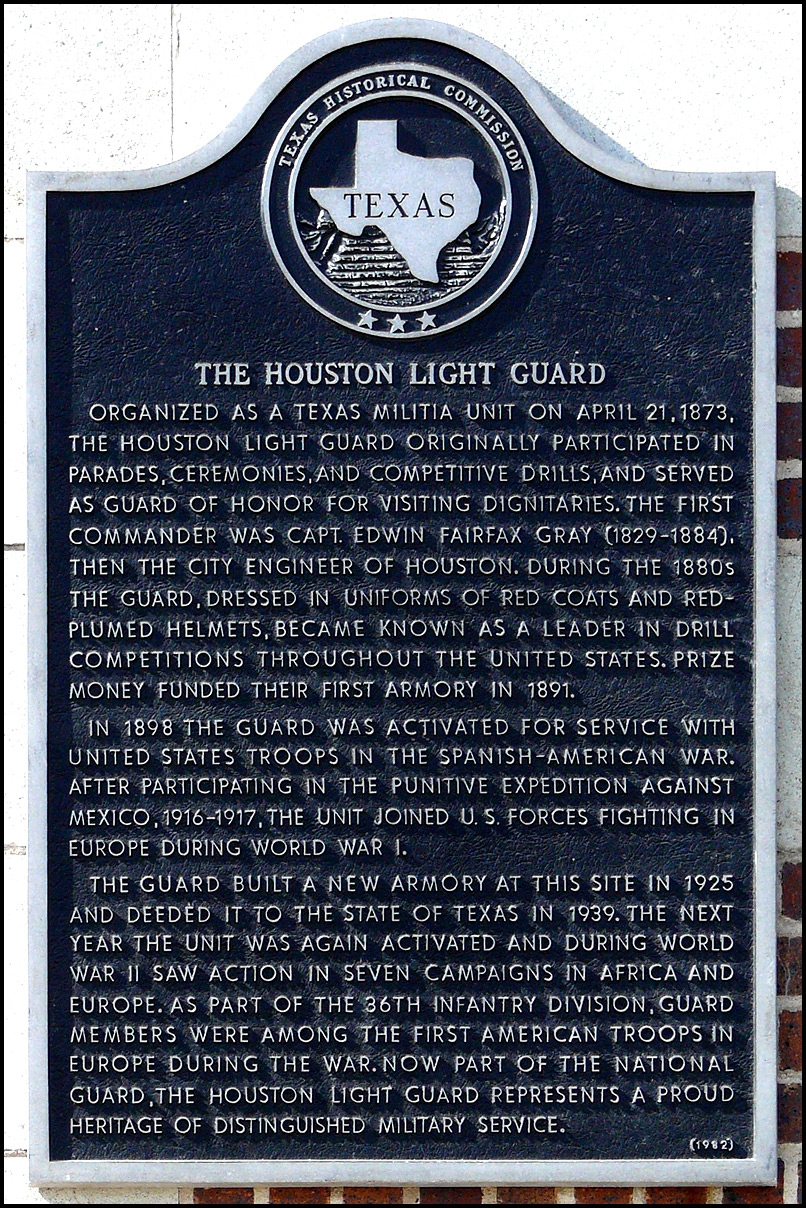
Houston Light Guard Historical Marker

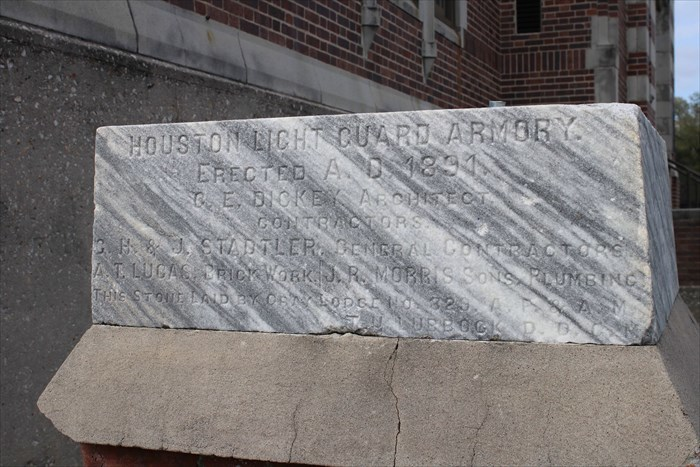
Original Houston Light Guard Armory Cornerstone. Laid by Gray Lodge No. 329 AF&AM in 1891 on the original Texas St. Armory then relaid on Caroline St. Armory. Many of the Houston Light Guards were also prominent Houston area Freemasons.

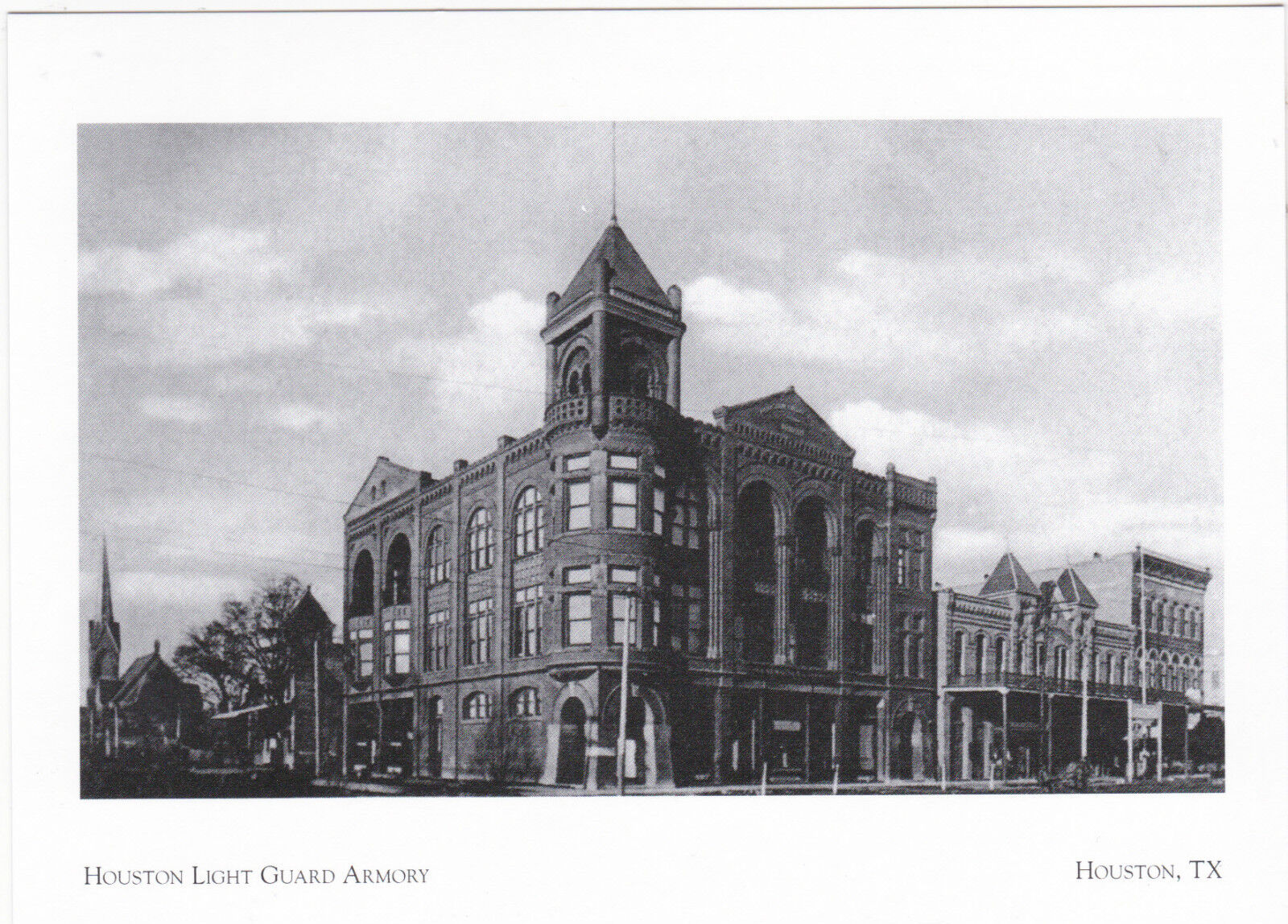
The original Houston Light Guard Armory on Texas St and Fannin Ave. Built in 1893.

== See also ==
- Texas Special Operations Units
