= Texas Army National Guard =

Component of the US Army and military of the U.S. state of Texas

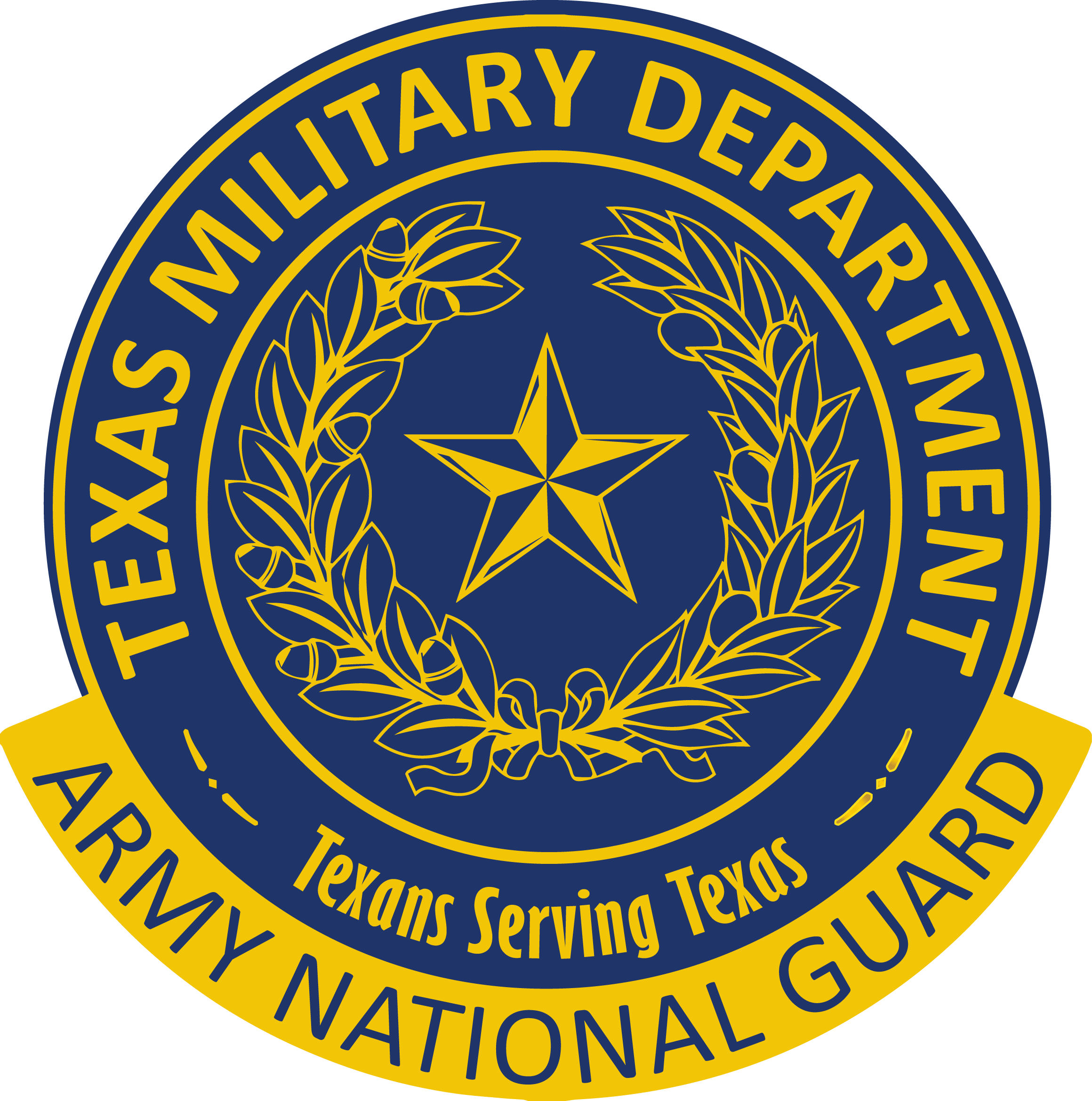
- Seal of the Texas Army National Guard
- Founded: 18 February 1823 (as Texas militia)
- Country: United States
- Allegiance: Texas
- Branch: United States Army
- Type: Militia
- Role: United States Army National Guard
- Size: 18,160 (2017)
- Part of: Texas Military Department: Texas Military Forces; Department of Defense: United States Army; U.S. National Guard
- Headquarters: Building Eight; Camp Mabry, Austin, Texas; 30°18′42.173″N 97°45′38.338″W
- Mottos: Always ready, Always there
- March: "Texas, Our Texas"
- Website: tmd.texas.gov/army-guard

Commanders
- Commander-in-Chief: Governor of Texas Greg Abbott
- Adjutant General: Major General Thomas M. Suelzer
- Commanding General: Brigadier General Gregory P. (Greg) Chaney
- Command Sergeant Major: Command Sergeant Major Jose Escobedo

Insignia
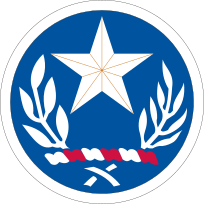
- Shoulder sleeve insignia

- Distinctive unit insignia

- Texas Army National Guard Crest

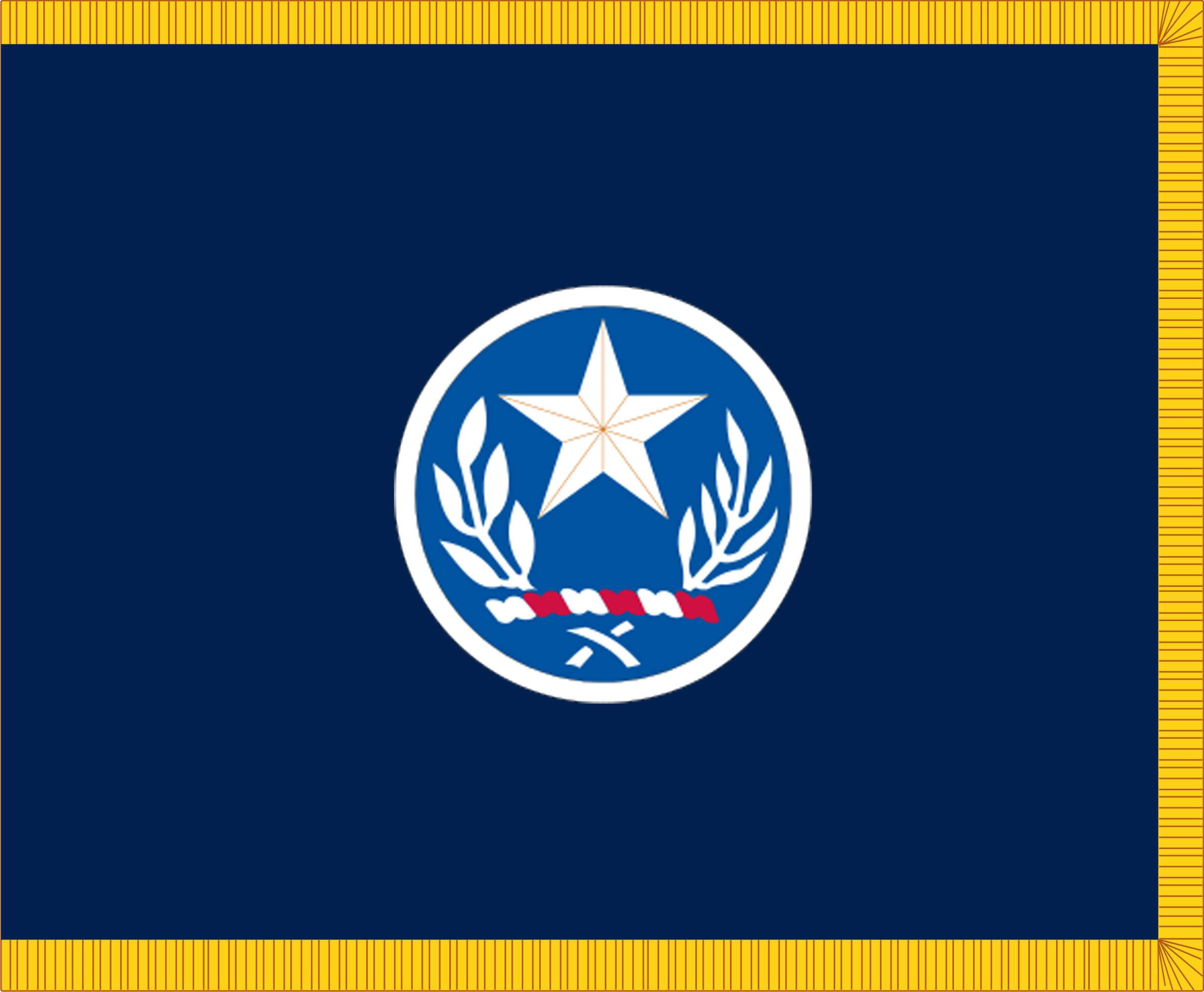
- Texas Army National Guard Headquarters Flag

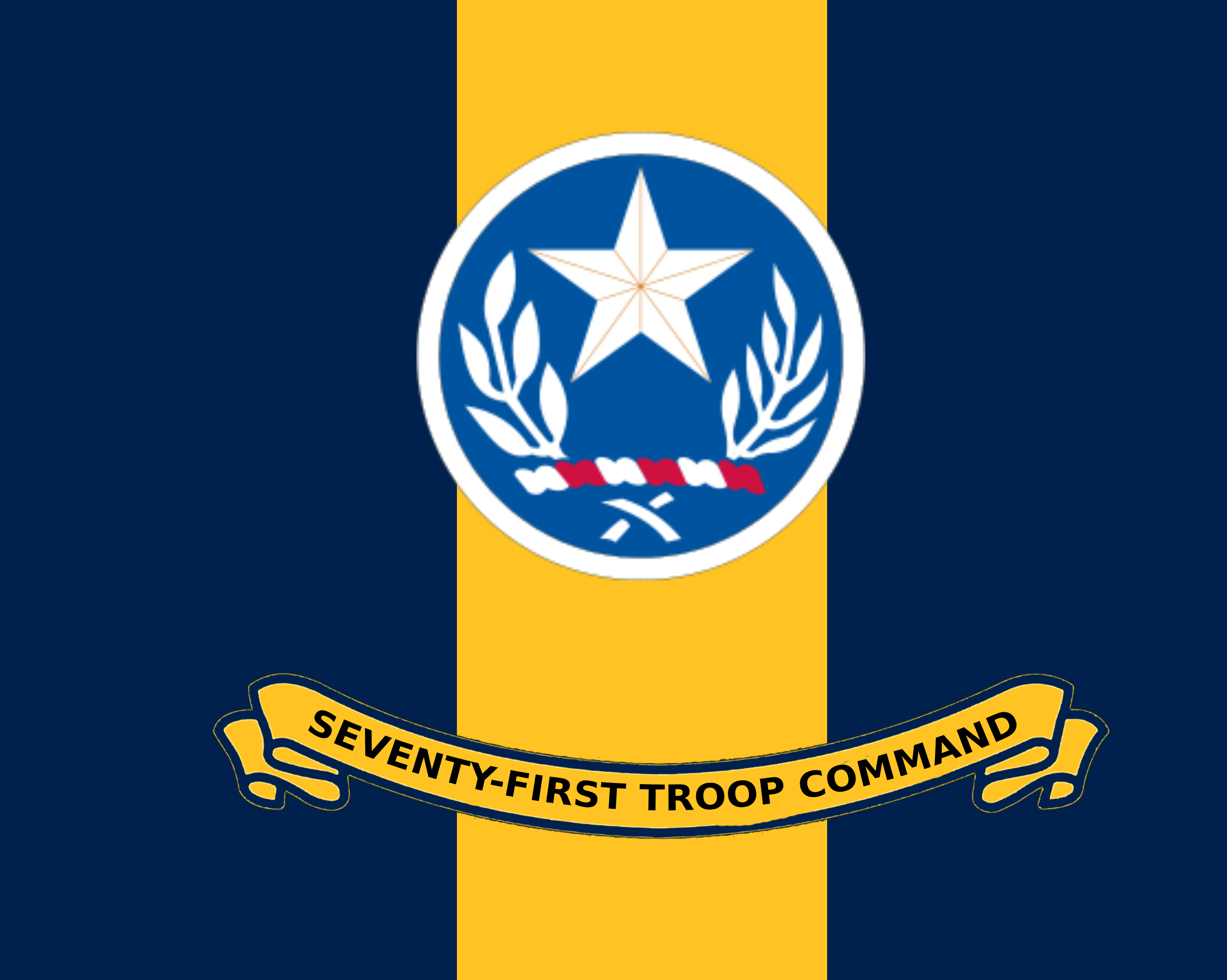
- Texas Army National Guard 71st Troop Command Flag

The Texas Army National Guard is a component of the United States Army, the United States National Guard and the Texas Military Forces (along with the Texas Air National Guard and the Texas State Guard).

Texas Army National Guard units are trained and equipped as part of the United States Army. The same ranks and insignia are used and National Guardsmen are eligible to receive all United States military awards. The Texas Guard also bestows a number of state awards for local services rendered in or to the state of Texas.

The Texas Army National Guard is composed of approximately 19,000 soldiers, and maintains 117 armories in 102 communities. State duties include disaster relief, emergency preparedness, security assistance to state law enforcement agencies, and some aspects of border security. The governor can activate the National Guard components under his control for state active duty in Texas, and in support of states (whether adjacent or not). The president of the United States of America can also activate the National Guard.

== History ==
The Texas Army National Guard has its roots in the Texas Militia formed by Stephen F. Austin at his headquarters village of San Felipe de Austin. Austin was empowered to "organize the Colonists into a body of National Militia" in the 18 February 1823 decree authorizing Austin to form his colony in Mexican Texas. Commissioned as Lieutenant Colonel, Austin organized the 5-company battalion at San Felipe de Austin on 22 June 1824. Three companies were formed on the Brazos River and two on the Colorado. This militia structure formed the basis for several of the volunteer companies raised to fight in the Texas Revolution of 1836.{}

The Militia Act of 1903 organized the various state militias into the present National Guard system. After World War II, the Texas National Guard was reorganized with the 36th Infantry Division and the new 49th Armored Division.

The 49th Armored Division was ordered to active federal service in October 1961 at Dallas, for the 1961 Berlin Crisis, and reverted to state control in August 1962. The 36th and 49th were inactivated in 1968 and reorganized into three separate brigades, the 36th Infantry Brigade, 71st Infantry Brigade and 72d Infantry Brigade (Mechanized) (Dallas). The division was reactivated on 1 November 1973, with its headquarters at Camp Mabry, Austin, Texas.

McGrath says the 36th Brigade insignia with star was authorized for wear from 10 May 1967 – 1 November 1973, but never worn, because the brigade at the time was designated 71st. The 36th Airborne Brigade was active from 1973, and inactivated on 1 April 1980.

In November 1976 the Texas Army National Guard, in the words of the AG Report 1975-76, was "organized into a State Headquarters and Headquarters Detachment, Public Information Detachment, the 49th Armored Division, and the Base Units Command of the State," both commanded by general officers. The 49th Armored Division had its headquarters in Austin; comprised three brigades, divisional artillery, and a Division Support Command; and was authorized a strength of 14,854 officers, warrant officers, and enlisted men. Its units were spread geographically across the entire state. The Base Units Command commanded every other unit in the TX ARNG except the division and the 100th Public Information Detachment. It consisted of one support center headquarters, one airborne brigade headquarters [the headquarters of the 36th Airborne Brigade)], one aviation group headquarters (111th), one support group headquarters, three battalions, one engineer dredge detachment, one assault support helicopter company, one air ambulance medical company, and one Combat Support Hospital (117th), with an authorized strength of 2,603 officers, warrant officers, and enlisted personnel (p. 5).

The 36th Brigade was reconstituted as a divisional formation (36th Brigade, 50th Armored Division) from 1988–92. In 1992 it became the 36th Brigade of the 49th Armored Division based at Houston, TX. It seems likely to have been active between 1992 and May 2004 when the 49th Armored Division became the 36th Infantry Division.

== Organization ==
As of February 2026 the Texas Army National Guard consists of the following units:

- Joint Force Headquarters-Texas, Army Element, at Camp Mabry
  - Headquarters and Headquarters Detachment, Joint Force Headquarters-Texas, Army Element, at Camp Mabry
  - Texas Recruiting & Retention Battalion, at Camp Mabry
    - Headquarters and Headquarters Company, Texas Recruiting & Retention Battalion, at Camp Mabry
    - Company A, Texas Recruiting & Retention Battalion, in Dallas
      - Team A, Company A, Texas R&R Battalion, in Lubbock
      - Team B, Company A, Texas R&R Battalion, in Grand Prairie
      - Team C, Company A, Texas R&R Battalion, in Fort Worth
      - Team D, Company A, Texas R&R Battalion, in McKinney
      - Team E, Company A, Texas R&R Battalion, in Tyler
    - Company B, Texas Recruiting & Retention Battalion, in Pasadena
      - Team F, Company B, Texas R&R Battalion, in Killeen
      - Team G, Company B, Texas R&R Battalion, in Houston
      - Team H, Company B, Texas R&R Battalion, in Houston
      - Team I, Company B, Texas R&R Battalion, in Houston
      - Team J, Company B, Texas R&R Battalion, in Pasadena
    - Company C, Texas Recruiting & Retention Battalion, at Camp Bullis
      - Team K, Company C, Texas R&R Battalion, in Cedar Park
      - Team L, Company C, Texas R&R Battalion, at Martindale Army Heliport
      - Team M, Company C, Texas R&R Battalion, in Corpus Christi
      - Team N, Company C, Texas R&R Battalion, in El Paso
      - Team O, Company C, Texas R&R Battalion, in New Braunfels
  - Texas Medical Detachment, at Camp Mabry
    - Detachment 1, Texas Medical Detachment, at Grand Prairie Army Airfield
    - Detachment 2, Texas Medical Detachment, at Ellington Field
    - Detachment 3, Texas Medical Detachment, at Camp Bullis
  - Texas Army National Guard Training Center, at Camp Swift
    - Headquarters and Headquarters Company, Texas Army National Guard Training Center, at Camp Swift
    - Detachment 1, Texas Army National Guard Training Center, at Camp Bowie
    - Detachment 2, Texas Army National Guard Training Center, at Camp Maxey
    - Detachment 3, Texas Army National Guard Training Center, at Camp Mabry
    - Detachment 4, Texas Army National Guard Training Center, at Fort Wolters
  - 4th Battalion (Field Artillery), 54th Security Force Assistance Brigade, in Red Bird
    - Headquarters and Headquarters Company, 5th Battalion (Field Artillery), 54th Security Force Assistance Brigade, in Red Bird
    - Company A, 4th Battalion (Field Artillery), 54th Security Force Assistance Brigade, in Red Bird
    - Company B, 4th Battalion (Field Artillery), 54th Security Force Assistance Brigade, in Red Bird
  - 1st Cavalry Division Main Command Post-Operational Detachment, at Fort Hood
  - 1st Armored Division Main Command Post-Operational Detachment, at Fort Bliss
  - Company A, 5th Battalion, 19th Special Forces Group (Airborne), at Camp Bullis
  - Company C, 5th Battalion, 19th Special Forces Group (Airborne), at Camp Bullis
  - 141st Chaplain Detachment, at Camp Mabry
  - 236th Judge Advocate General Trial Defense Team, at Camp Mabry
  - 237th Judge Advocate General Trial Defense Team, at Camp Mabry
  - 249th Judge Advocate General Trial Defense Team, at Camp Mabry
  - Army Aviation Support Facility #1, at Austin–Bergstrom Airport
  - Army Aviation Support Facility #2, at Martindale Army Heliport
  - Army Aviation Support Facility #3, at Grand Prairie Army Airfield
  - Army Aviation Support Facility #4, at Ellington Field
  - Aerial Delivery Support Facility #1, at Camp Mabry
  - Aerial Delivery Support Facility #2, in Saginaw
  - Combined Support Maintenance Shop #1, in Saginaw
  - Combined Support Maintenance Shop #2, at Camp Mabry
  - Maneuver Area Training Equipment Site #1, at Fort Hood
  - Unit Training Equipment Site #1, at Camp Maxey
  - Unit Training Equipment Site #2, at Fort Wolters
  - Unit Training Equipment Site #3, at Camp Swift
  - Unit Training Equipment Site #4, at Camp Bowie
  - Unit Training Equipment Site #5, at Camp Bullis
  - Unit Training Equipment Site #6, at Fort Bliss
  - Field Maintenance Shop #1, at Dyess Air Force Base
  - Field Maintenance Shop #2, at Camp Mabry
  - Field Maintenance Shop #3, at Austin–Bergstrom Airport
  - Field Maintenance Shop #5, in Round Rock
  - Field Maintenance Shop #6, in Laredo
  - Field Maintenance Shop #7, in Corpus Christi
  - Field Maintenance Shop #8, in Red Bird
  - Field Maintenance Shop #9, in Wylie
  - Field Maintenance Shop #10, in Grand Prairie
  - Field Maintenance Shop #11, in Bryan
  - Field Maintenance Shop #15, in Fort Worth
  - Field Maintenance Shop #16, at Grand Prairie Army Airfield
  - Field Maintenance Shop #18, at Ellington Field
  - Field Maintenance Shop #20, in Lubbock
  - Field Maintenance Shop #21, in Marshall
  - Field Maintenance Shop #23, in San Marcos
  - Field Maintenance Shop #25, in Weslaco
  - Field Maintenance Shop #26, in Houston
  - Field Maintenance Shop #27, at Martindale Army Heliport
  - Field Maintenance Shop #29, at Joint Base San Antonio
  - Field Maintenance Shop #30, in Temple
  - Field Maintenance Shop #31, in Seagoville
  - Field Maintenance Shop #33, in Waco
  - Field Maintenance Shop #36, in Houston
  - 36th Infantry Division, at Camp Mabry
    - Headquarters and Headquarters Battalion, 36th Infantry Division, at Camp Mabry
      - Headquarters Support Company, 36th Infantry Division, at Camp Mabry
      - Company A (Operations), Headquarters and Headquarters Battalion, 36th Infantry Division, at Camp Mabry
        - Detachment 1, Company A (Operations), Headquarters and Headquarters Battalion, 36th Infantry Division, at Austin–Bergstrom Airport
      - Company B (Intelligence and Sustainment), Headquarters and Headquarters Battalion, 36th Infantry Division, at Camp Mabry
      - Company C (Signal), Headquarters and Headquarters Battalion, 36th Infantry Division, at Camp Mabry
      - 36th Infantry Division Band, at Camp Mabry
    - 56th Infantry Brigade Combat Team, in Fort Worth
      - Headquarters and Headquarters Company, 56th Infantry Brigade Combat Team, in Fort Worth
      - 1st Squadron, 124th Cavalry Regiment, in Waco
        - Headquarters and Headquarters Troop, 1st Squadron, 124th Cavalry Regiment, in Waco
        - Troop A, 1st Squadron, 124th Cavalry Regiment, in Waco
        - Troop B, 1st Squadron, 124th Cavalry Regiment, in Waco
        - Troop C (Dismounted), 1st Squadron, 124th Cavalry Regiment, in Grand Prairie
      - 2nd Battalion, 142nd Infantry Regiment, in Lubbock
        - Headquarters and Headquarters Company, 2nd Battalion, 142nd Infantry Regiment, in Lubbock
        - Company A, 2nd Battalion, 142nd Infantry Regiment, in Amarillo
        - Company B, 2nd Battalion, 142nd Infantry Regiment, in Denison
        - Company C, 2nd Battalion, 142nd Infantry Regiment, at Midland Airport
        - Company D (Weapons), 2nd Battalion, 142nd Infantry Regiment, in Wichita Falls
      - 1st Battalion, 143rd Infantry Regiment (Airborne), in White Settlement
        - Headquarters and Headquarters Company, 1st Battalion, 143rd Infantry Regiment (Airborne), in White Settlement
        - Company A, 1st Battalion, 143rd Infantry Regiment (Airborne), in Huntsville
        - Company B, 1st Battalion, 143rd Infantry Regiment (Airborne), in Seagoville
        - Company C, 1st Battalion, 143rd Infantry Regiment (Airborne), in East Greenwich (RI) — (Rhode Island Army National Guard)
        - Company D (Weapons), 1st Battalion, 143rd Infantry Regiment (Airborne), in Seagoville
        - 143rd Forward Support Company, in White Settlement
      - 3rd Battalion, 144th Infantry Regiment, in Wylie
        - Headquarters and Headquarters Company, 3rd Battalion, 144th Infantry Regiment, in Wylie
        - Company A, 3rd Battalion, 144th Infantry Regiment, in Greenville
        - Company B, 3rd Battalion, 144th Infantry Regiment, at Kilgore
        - Company C, 3rd Battalion, 144th Infantry Regiment, in Seagoville
        - Company D (Weapons), 3rd Battalion, 144th Infantry Regiment, in Palestine
      - 3rd Battalion, 133rd Field Artillery Regiment, at Fort Bliss
        - Headquarters and Headquarters Battery, 3rd Battalion, 133rd Field Artillery Regiment, at Fort Bliss
        - Battery A, 3rd Battalion, 133rd Field Artillery Regiment, at Fort Bliss
        - Battery B, 3rd Battalion, 133rd Field Artillery Regiment, at Fort Bliss
        - Battery C, 3rd Battalion, 133rd Field Artillery Regiment, at Fort Bliss
      - 156th Brigade Engineer Battalion, in Grand Prairie
        - Headquarters and Headquarters Company, 156th Brigade Engineer Battalion, in Grand Prairie
        - Company A (Combat Engineer), 156th Brigade Engineer Battalion, in Lewisville
        - Company B (Combat Engineer), 156th Brigade Engineer Battalion, in Decatur
        - Company C (Signal), 156th Brigade Engineer Battalion, in Grand Prairie
        - Company D (Military Intelligence), 156th Brigade Engineer Battalion, in Grand Prairie
          - Detachment 1, Company D (Military Intelligence), 156th Brigade Engineer Battalion, at Fort Hood (RQ-28A UAV)
      - 949th Brigade Support Battalion, in Fort Worth
        - Headquarters and Headquarters Company, 949th Brigade Support Battalion, in Fort Worth
        - Company A (Distribution), 949th Brigade Support Battalion, in Fort Worth
        - Company B (Maintenance), 949th Brigade Support Battalion, at Fort Worth
        - Company C (Medical), 949th Brigade Support Battalion, in Grand Prairie
        - Company D (Forward Support), 949th Brigade Support Battalion, in Waco — attached to 1st Squadron, 124th Cavalry Regiment
        - Company E (Forward Support), 949th Brigade Support Battalion, in Denton — attached to 156th Brigade Engineer Battalion
        - Company F (Forward Support), 949th Brigade Support Battalion, at Fort Bliss — attached to 3rd Battalion, 133rd Field Artillery Regiment
        - Company G (Forward Support), 949th Brigade Support Battalion, in Lubbock — attached to 2nd Battalion, 142nd Infantry Regiment
        - Company H (Forward Support), 949th Brigade Support Battalion, in Wylie — attached to 3rd Battalion, 144th Infantry Regiment
    - 72nd Infantry Brigade Combat Team, in Houston
      - Headquarters and Headquarters Company, 72nd Infantry Brigade Combat Team, in Houston
      - 1st Squadron, 112th Cavalry Regiment, in Bryan
        - Headquarters and Headquarters Troop, 1st Squadron, 112th Cavalry Regiment, in Bryan
        - Troop A, 1st Squadron, 112th Cavalry Regiment, in Taylor
        - Troop B, 1st Squadron, 112th Cavalry Regiment, in Rosenberg
        - Troop C (Dismounted), 1st Squadron, 112th Cavalry Regiment, at Ellington Field
      - 3rd Battalion, 138th Infantry Regiment, in Kansas City (MO) — (Missouri Army National Guard)
      - 1st Battalion, 141st Infantry Regiment, at Camp Bullis
        - Headquarters and Headquarters Company, 1st Battalion, 141st Infantry Regiment, at Camp Bullis
        - Company A, 1st Battalion, 141st Infantry Regiment, in Hondo
        - Company B, 1st Battalion, 141st Infantry Regiment, in San Marcos
        - Company C, 1st Battalion, 141st Infantry Regiment, in Fredericksburg
        - Company D (Weapons), 1st Battalion, 141st Infantry Regiment, at Camp Bullis
      - 3rd Battalion, 141st Infantry Regiment, in Weslaco
        - Headquarters and Headquarters Company, 3rd Battalion, 141st Infantry Regiment, in Weslaco
        - Company A, 3rd Battalion, 141st Infantry Regiment, in Brownsville
        - Company B, 3rd Battalion, 141st Infantry Regiment, in Laredo
        - Company C, 3rd Battalion, 141st Infantry Regiment, in Weslaco
        - Company D (Weapons), 3rd Battalion, 141st Infantry Regiment, in Victoria
      - 3rd Squadron, 278th Armored Cavalry Regiment, in Temple (part of 278th Armored Cavalry Regiment)
        - Headquarters and Headquarters Troop, 3rd Squadron, 278th Armored Cavalry Regiment, in Temple
        - Troop H (Forward Support), Regimental Support Squadron, 278th Armored Cavalry Regiment, in Temple
        - Troop I (Tank), 3rd Squadron, 278th Armored Cavalry Regiment, at Fort Hood
        - Troop K (Tank), 3rd Squadron, 278th Armored Cavalry Regiment, in Temple
        - Troop L (Mechanized Infantry), 3rd Squadron, 278th Armored Cavalry Regiment, in Temple
      - 1st Battalion, 133rd Field Artillery Regiment, in Houston
        - Headquarters and Headquarters Battery, 1st Battalion, 133rd Field Artillery Regiment, in Houston
        - Battery A, 1st Battalion, 133rd Field Artillery Regiment, in Lufkin
        - Battery B, 1st Battalion, 133rd Field Artillery Regiment, in Lufkin
        - Battery C, 1st Battalion, 133rd Field Artillery Regiment, at Houston
      - 172nd Brigade Engineer Battalion, in Houston
        - Headquarters and Headquarters Company, 172nd Brigade Engineer Battalion, in Houston
        - Company A (Combat Engineer), 172nd Brigade Engineer Battalion, in Brenham
        - Company B (Combat Engineer), 172nd Brigade Engineer Battalion, in Angleton
        - Company C (Signal), 172nd Brigade Engineer Battalion, in Houston
        - Company D (Military Intelligence), 172nd Brigade Engineer Battalion, in Houston
          - Detachment 1, Company D (Military Intelligence), 172nd Brigade Engineer Battalion, at Fort Hood (RQ-28A UAV)
      - 536th Brigade Support Battalion, in Huntsville
        - Headquarters and Headquarters Company, 536th Brigade Support Battalion, in Huntsville
        - Company A (Distribution), 536th Brigade Support Battalion, in Houston
          - Detachment 1, Company A (Distribution), 536th Brigade Support Battalion, in Weslaco
        - Company B (Maintenance), 536th Brigade Support Battalion, in Killeen
        - Company C (Medical), 536th Brigade Support Battalion, in La Marque
        - Company D (Forward Support), 536th Brigade Support Battalion, in Bryan — attached to 1st Squadron, 112th Cavalry Regiment
        - Company E (Forward Support), 536th Brigade Support Battalion, in Houston — attached to 172nd Brigade Engineer Battalion
        - Company F (Forward Support), 536th Brigade Support Battalion, in Houston — attached to 1st Battalion, 133rd Field Artillery Regiment
        - Company G (Forward Support), 536th Brigade Support Battalion, at Camp Bullis — attached to 1st Battalion, 141st Infantry Regiment
        - Company H (Forward Support), 536th Brigade Support Battalion, in Weslaco — attached to 3rd Battalion, 141st Infantry Regiment
        - Company I (Forward Support), 536th Brigade Support Battalion, in Jefferson City (MO) — attached to 3rd Battalion, 138th Infantry Regiment (Missouri Army National Guard)
    - 81st Stryker Brigade Combat Team, at Camp Murray (WA) — (Washington Army National Guard)
    - 155th Armored Brigade Combat Team, in Tupelo (MS) — (Mississippi Army National Guard)
    - 278th Armored Cavalry Regiment, in Knoxville (TN) — (Tennessee Army National Guard)
    - 36th Division Artillery, at Camp Mabry
      - Headquarters and Headquarters Battery, 36th Division Artillery, at Camp Mabry
    - 36th Combat Aviation Brigade, at Austin–Bergstrom Airport
      - Headquarters and Headquarters Company, 36th Combat Aviation Brigade, at Austin–Bergstrom Airport
      - Company C, 1st Battalion (Assault), 108th Aviation Regiment, at Austin–Bergstrom Airport (UH-60M Black Hawk)
        - Detachment 1, Headquarters and Headquarters Company, 1st Battalion (Assault), 108th Aviation Regiment, at Austin–Bergstrom Airport
        - Detachment 1, Company B, 1st Battalion (Assault), 108th Aviation Regiment, at Austin–Bergstrom Airport (UH-60M Black Hawk)
        - Detachment 1, Company D (AVUM), 1st Battalion (Assault), 108th Aviation Regiment, at Austin–Bergstrom Airport
        - Detachment 1, Company E (Forward Support), 1st Battalion (Assault), 108th Aviation Regiment, at Austin–Bergstrom Airport
      - Company B, 1st Battalion (Security & Support), 114th Aviation Regiment, at Austin–Bergstrom Airport (UH-72A Lakota)
      - Detachment 7, Company B, 2nd Battalion (Fixed Wing), 641st Aviation Regiment (Detachment 49, Operational Support Airlift Activity), at Austin–Bergstrom Airport (C-12 Huron)
      - 1st Battalion (Attack Reconnaissance), 149th Aviation Regiment, at Ellington Field
        - Headquarters and Headquarters Company, 1st Battalion (Attack Reconnaissance), 149th Aviation Regiment, at Ellington Field
          - Detachment 1, Headquarters and Headquarters Company, 1st Battalion (Attack Reconnaissance), 149th Aviation Regiment, at Tupelo Airport (MS) — (Mississippi Army National Guard)
        - Company A, 1st Battalion (Attack Reconnaissance), 149th Aviation Regiment, at Tupelo Airport (MS) (AH-64E Apache) — (Mississippi Army National Guard)
        - Company B, 1st Battalion (Attack Reconnaissance), 149th Aviation Regiment, at Ellington Field (AH-64E Apache)
        - Company C, 1st Battalion (Attack Reconnaissance), 149th Aviation Regiment, at Ellington Field (AH-64E Apache)
        - Company D (AVUM), 1st Battalion (Attack Reconnaissance), 149th Aviation Regiment, at Ellington Field
          - Detachment 1, Company D (AVUM), 1st Battalion (Attack Reconnaissance), 149th Aviation Regiment, at Tupelo Airport (MS) — (Mississippi Army National Guard)
        - Company E (Forward Support), 1st Battalion (Attack Reconnaissance), 149th Aviation Regiment, at Ellington Field
          - Detachment 1, Company E (Forward Support), 1st Battalion (Attack Reconnaissance), 149th Aviation Regiment, at Tupelo Airport (MS) — (Mississippi Army National Guard)
      - 2nd Battalion (General Support Aviation), 149th Aviation Regiment, at Grand Prairie Army Airfield
        - Headquarters and Headquarters Company, 2nd Battalion (General Support Aviation), 149th Aviation Regiment, at Grand Prairie Army Airfield
          - Detachment 1, Headquarters and Headquarters Company, 2nd Battalion (General Support Aviation), 149th Aviation Regiment, at Robinson Army Airfield (AR) — (Arkansas Army National Guard)
          - Detachment 2, Headquarters and Headquarters Company, 2nd Battalion (General Support Aviation), 149th Aviation Regiment, at Muldrow Army Heliport (OK) — (Oklahoma Army National Guard)
          - Detachment 3, Headquarters and Headquarters Company, 2nd Battalion (General Support Aviation), 149th Aviation Regiment, at Martindale Army Heliport
        - Company A (CAC), 2nd Battalion (General Support Aviation), 149th Aviation Regiment, at Robinson Army Airfield (AR) (UH-60L Black Hawk) — (Arkansas Army National Guard)
          - Detachment 1, Company A (CAC), 2nd Battalion (General Support Aviation), 149th Aviation Regiment, at Cheyenne Air National Guard Base (WY) — (Wyoming Army National Guard)
        - Company B (Heavy Lift), 2nd Battalion (General Support Aviation), 149th Aviation Regiment, at Grand Prairie Army Airfield (CH-47F Chinook)
          - Detachment 1, Company B (Heavy Lift), 2nd Battalion (General Support Aviation), 149th Aviation Regiment, at Muldrow Army Heliport (OK) — (Oklahoma Army National Guard)
        - Company C (MEDEVAC), 2nd Battalion (General Support Aviation), 149th Aviation Regiment, at Martindale Army Heliport (HH-60L Black Hawk)
          - Detachment 1, Company C (MEDEVAC), 2nd Battalion (General Support Aviation), 149th Aviation Regiment, at Silverbell Army Heliport (AZ) — (Arizona Army National Guard)
          - Detachment 2, Company C (MEDEVAC), 2nd Battalion (General Support Aviation), 149th Aviation Regiment, at Papago Army Heliport (AZ) — (Arizona Army National Guard)
        - Company D (AVUM), 2nd Battalion (General Support Aviation), 149th Aviation Regiment, at Grand Prairie Army Airfield
          - Detachment 1, Company D (AVUM), 2nd Battalion (General Support Aviation), 149th Aviation Regiment, at Robinson Army Airfield (AR) — (Arkansas Army National Guard)
          - Detachment 2, Company D (AVUM), 2nd Battalion (General Support Aviation), 149th Aviation Regiment, at Muldrow Army Heliport (OK) — (Oklahoma Army National Guard)
          - Detachment 3, Company D (AVUM), 2nd Battalion (General Support Aviation), 149th Aviation Regiment, at Martindale Army Heliport
          - Detachment 4, Company D (AVUM), 2nd Battalion (General Support Aviation), 149th Aviation Regiment, at Silverbell Army Heliport (AZ) — (Arizona Army National Guard)
          - Detachment 5, Company D (AVUM), 2nd Battalion (General Support Aviation), 149th Aviation Regiment, at Papago Army Heliport (AZ) — (Arizona Army National Guard)
          - Detachment 7, Company D (AVUM), 2nd Battalion (General Support Aviation), 149th Aviation Regiment, at Cheyenne Air National Guard Base (WY) — (Wyoming Army National Guard)
        - Company E (Forward Support), 2nd Battalion (General Support Aviation), 149th Aviation Regiment, at Grand Prairie Army Airfield
          - Detachment 1, Company E (Forward Support), 2nd Battalion (General Support Aviation), 149th Aviation Regiment, at Robinson Army Airfield (AR) — (Arkansas Army National Guard)
          - Detachment 2, Company E (Forward Support), 2nd Battalion (General Support Aviation), 149th Aviation Regiment, at Muldrow Army Heliport (OK) — (Oklahoma Army National Guard)
          - Detachment 3, Company E (Forward Support), 2nd Battalion (General Support Aviation), 149th Aviation Regiment, at Martindale Army Heliport
          - Detachment 4, Company E (Forward Support), 2nd Battalion (General Support Aviation), 149th Aviation Regiment, at Silverbell Army Heliport (AZ) — (Arizona Army National Guard)
          - Detachment 5, Company E (Forward Support), 2nd Battalion (General Support Aviation), 149th Aviation Regiment, at Papago Army Heliport (AZ) — (Arizona Army National Guard)
          - Detachment 7, Company E (Forward Support), 2nd Battalion (General Support Aviation), 149th Aviation Regiment, at Cheyenne Air National Guard Base (WY) — (Wyoming Army National Guard)
        - Company F (ATS), 2nd Battalion (General Support Aviation), 149th Aviation Regiment, at Martindale Army Heliport
      - 1st Battalion (Assault), 185th Aviation Regiment, at Tupelo Airport (MS) — (Mississippi Army National Guard)
      - 449th Aviation Support Battalion, at Martindale Army Heliport
        - Headquarters Support Company, 449th Aviation Support Battalion, at Martindale Army Heliport
        - Company A (Distribution), 449th Aviation Support Battalion, at Martindale Army Heliport
        - Company B (AVIM), 449th Aviation Support Battalion, at Austin–Bergstrom Airport
          - Detachment 1, Company B (AVIM), 449th Aviation Support Battalion, at Tupelo Airport (MS) — (Mississippi Army National Guard)
          - Detachment 2, Company B (AVIM), 449th Aviation Support Battalion, at Grand Prairie Army Airfield
          - Detachment 3, Company B (AVIM), 449th Aviation Support Battalion, at Ellington Field
          - Detachment 4, Company B (AVIM), 449th Aviation Support Battalion, at South Valley Airport (UT) — (Utah Army National Guard)
        - Company C (Signal), 449th Aviation Support Battalion, at Austin–Bergstrom Airport
    - 36th Division Sustainment Brigade, in Red Bird
      - 197th Special Troops Support Company (Airborne), at Camp Bullis (part of 19th Special Forces Group)
      - 36th Division Sustainment Troops Battalion, in Red Bird
        - Headquarters and Headquarters Company, 36th Division Sustainment Brigade, in Red Bird
        - 49th Finance Finance Company, in San Marcos
          - 149th Financial Management Support Detachment, in San Marcos
          - 249th Financial Management Support Detachment, in San Marcos
        - 149th Human Resources Company, in Grand Prairie
        - 449th Signal Company, in Red Bird
        - 1936th Support Company (Contracting), at Camp Mabry
          - 1956th Support Detachment (Contracting Team), at Camp Mabry
          - 1972nd Support Detachment (Contracting Team), at Camp Mabry
      - 111th Medical Battalion (Multifunctional), at Camp Bullis
        - Headquarters and Headquarters Detachment, 111th Medical Battalion (Multifunctional), at Camp Bullis
        - 162nd Medical Company (Area Support), at Camp Bullis
      - 372nd Division Sustainment Support Battalion, in Dallas
        - Headquarters and Headquarters Company, 372nd Division Sustainment Support Battalion, in Dallas
        - Company A (Composite Supply Company), 372nd Division Sustainment Support Battalion, in Corsicana
        - Company B (Support Maintenance Company), 372nd Division Sustainment Support Battalion, in Fort Worth
          - Detachment 1, Company B (Support Maintenance Company), 372nd Division Sustainment Support Battalion, at Red River Army Depot
        - Company C (Composite Truck Company), 372nd Division Sustainment Support Battalion, in Waxahachie
          - Detachment 1, Company C (Composite Truck Company), 372nd Division Sustainment Support Battalion, in Marshall
        - 249th Transportation Company (Light-Medium Truck), in Killeen
        - 294th Quartermaster Company (Theater Aerial Delivery) (Airborne), at Austin–Bergstrom Airport
        - 1836th Transportation Company (Combat HET), at Fort Bliss
    - 111th Sustainment Brigade, in Rio Rancho (NM) — (New Mexico Army National Guard)
    - 136th Maneuver Enhancement Brigade, in Round Rock
      - Headquarters Support Company, 136th Maneuver Enhancement Brigade, in Round Rock
      - 6th Civil Support Team (WMD), at Camp Mabry
      - 436th Chemical Company, in Laredo
        - Detachment 1, 436th Chemical Company, in Round Rock
      - 454th Engineer Company (Clearance), in Kingsville
      - 625th Signal Company, in Round Rock
      - 4th Battalion, 133rd Field Artillery Regiment, in San Marcos (M142 HIMARS) (part of 45th Field Artillery Brigade)
        - Headquarters and Headquarters Battery, 4th Battalion, 133rd Field Artillery Regiment, in San Marcos
        - Battery A, 4th Battalion, 133rd Field Artillery Regiment, in New Braunfels
        - Battery B, 4th Battalion, 133rd Field Artillery Regiment, in San Marcos
          - Detachment 1, Battery B, 4th Battalion, 133rd Field Artillery Regiment, in Wichita Falls
        - 133rd Forward Support Company, in San Marcos
          - Detachment 1, 133rd Forward Support Company, in Wichita Falls
      - 136th Military Police Battalion, in Tyler
        - Headquarters and Headquarters Detachment, 136th Military Police Battalion, in Tyler
        - 236th Military Police Company (Combat Support), at Joint Base San Antonio
        - 606th Military Police Company (Detention), in El Paso
        - 712th Military Police Company (Combat Support), at Ellington Field
    - 176th Engineer Brigade, in Austin
      - Headquarters and Headquarters Company, 176th Engineer Brigade, in Austin
      - 111th Engineer Battalion, at Dyess Air Force Base
        - Headquarters and Headquarters Company, 111th Engineer Battalion, at Dyess Air Force Base
        - Forward Support Company, 111th Engineer Battalion, at Dyess Air Force Base
        - 111th Engineer Platoon (Area Clearance), at Dyess Air Force Base
        - 211th Engineer Detachment (Concrete Section), at Camp Bowie
        - 236th Engineer Company (Vertical Construction Company), in Stephenville
        - 822nd Engineer Company (Engineer Construction Company), at Camp Bowie
        - 836th Engineer Company (Sapper), in San Angelo
        - 840th Engineer Company (Mobility Augmentation Company), in Weatherford
      - 386th Engineer Battalion, in Corpus Christi
        - Headquarters and Headquarters Company, 386th Engineer Battalion, in Corpus Christi
        - Forward Support Company, 386th Engineer Battalion, in Corpus Christi
        - 272nd Engineer Company (Vertical Construction Company), at Camp Swift
        - 442nd Engineer Company (Mobility Augmentation Company), in Angleton
        - 551st Engineer Company (Multirole Bridge), in El Campo
  - 71st Troop Command, in Bee Cave
    - Headquarters and Headquarters Company, 71st Troop Command, in Bee Cave
    - Special Operations Detachment-Africa (Airborne), in Bee Cave
    - 100th Mobile Public Affairs Detachment, in Bee Cave
    - Detachment 1, Cyber Protection Team 178, at Camp Mabry
    - 71st Military Intelligence Brigade (Expeditionary), at Joint Base San Antonio
      - Headquarters and Headquarters Company, in 71st Military Intelligence Brigade (Expeditionary), at Joint Base San Antonio
      - 250th Military Intelligence Battalion, in Long Beach (CA) — (California Army National Guard)
        - Headquarters and Headquarters Company, 250th Military Intelligence Battalion, in Long Beach
        - Company A, 250th Military Intelligence Battalion, at Joint Forces Training Base – Los Alamitos
        - Company B, 250th Military Intelligence Battalion, in Long Beach
      - 636th Military Intelligence Battalion, at Joint Base San Antonio
        - Headquarters and Headquarters Company, 636th Military Intelligence Battalion, at Joint Base San Antonio
        - Company A, 636th Military Intelligence Battalion, in Seguin
        - Company B, 636th Military Intelligence Battalion, at Joint Base San Antonio
    - 71st Theater Information Operations Group, at Camp Mabry
      - Headquarters and Headquarters Company, in 71st Theater Information Operations Group, at Camp Mabry
      - 101st Information Operations Battalion, at Camp Mabry
        - Headquarters and Headquarters Company, 101st Information Operations Battalion, at Camp Mabry
        - Company A, 101st Information Operations Battalion, at Camp Mabry
        - Company B, 101st Information Operations Battalion, at Camp Mabry
      - 102nd Information Operations Battalion, at Camp Mabry
        - Headquarters and Headquarters Company, 102nd Information Operations Battalion, at Camp Mabry
        - Company A, 102nd Information Operations Battalion, at Camp Mabry
        - Company B, 102nd Information Operations Battalion, at Camp Mabry
    - 136th Signal Battalion, at Ellington Field
      - Headquarters and Headquarters Company, 136th Signal Battalion, at Ellington Field
      - Company A, 136th Signal Battalion, in Lewisville
      - Company B, 136th Signal Battalion, at Camp Beauregard (LA) — (Louisiana Army National Guard)
      - Company C, 136th Signal Battalion, at Ellington Field
    - 136th Regiment, Regional Training Institute, at Fort Hood
      - 1st Battalion, 136th Regiment, at Fort Hood
      - 2nd Battalion, 136th Regiment, at Camp Swift

Aviation unit abbreviations: CAC — Command Aviation Company; MEDEVAC — Medical evacuation; AVUM — Aviation Unit Maintenance; AVIM — Aviation Intermediate Maintenance; ATS — Air Traffic Service

=== Unit histories ===
On 1 September 2009, the Texas Army National Guard activated the 1st Battalion (Airborne), 143rd Infantry Regiment, the only Airborne infantry battalion in the Army National Guard. The unit includes the battalion headquarters and headquarters company (HHC), three rifle companies (Companies A, B, and C), a heavy weapons company (Company D), and a forward support company (FSC—previously Company E). Most elements of the battalion are located in Texas, but Company C is located in Rhode Island. Rather than converting an existing TX ARNG unit, the battalion was built from the ground up. The 1st Battalion, 143rd Infantry Regiment is a separate unit and it is not subordinate to other commands in the state, although it is attached to the 71st Battlefield Surveillance Brigade for local administration. In 2016 Company B, which was originally located in Bethel, Alaska, was inactivated as part of the Alaska ARNG. Troop C (LRS), 3rd Squadron, 124th Cavalry Regiment, Texas ARNG in Terrell, Texas was then used to reform Company B. During the same year, the battalion became affiliated with the 173rd Airborne Brigade Combat Team in Vicenza, Italy, and adopted the shoulder sleeve insignia of the 173rd ABCT.

=== Historic units ===
141st Infantry Regiment

142nd Infantry Regiment

143rd Infantry Regiment

144th Infantry Regiment

112th Cavalry Regiment

124th Cavalry Regiment

131st Field Artillery Regiment

133rd Field Artillery Regiment

=== Additional Units ===
49th Finance Battalion

111th Engineer Battalion

111th Medical Battalion

136th Military Police Battalion

136th Regiment

136th Signal Battalion

136th Signal Battalion (Obsolete)

149th Aviation Regiment

149th Personnel Services Battalion

156th Engineer Battalion

176th Engineer Battalion

386th Engineer Battalion

449th Support Battalion

636th Support Battalion

649th Military Intelligence Battalion

949th Support Battalion

Special Troops Battalion, 36th Infantry Division

Special Troops Battalion, 72nd Brigade Combat Team, 36th Infantry Division
