= 133rd Field Artillery Regiment =

133d Field Artillery Regiment
- Coat of arms
- Active: 1899
- Country: United States
- Allegiance: Texas
- Branch: Texas National Guard
- Type: Field artillery
- Size: Regiment
- Mottos: Dum Spiramus Tuebimur (While We Breathe, We Shall Defend)

Insignia
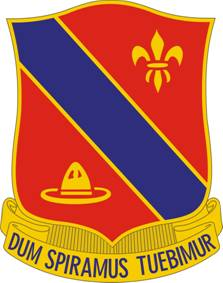
- Distinctive unit insignia

The 133rd Field Artillery Regiment is a parent field artillery regiment of the United States Army National Guard. It is currently represented in the Texas Army National Guard by the 1st, 3rd, and 4th Battalions.

Battery E, 1st Battalion, 133rd Field Artillery of the 49th Armored Division served in Iraq March 2004 until March 2005. Attached to the 2ID and 36ID. 1st and 3rd counter motor radar units were assigned to FOB Marez, Mosul, Iraq. Other radar units were stationed in different areas of Iraq.

== History ==
The lineage of the 133rd Field Artillery Regiment is carried by 1st Battalion, a unit of the 72nd Infantry Brigade Combat Team; 3rd Battalion, a unit of the 56th Infantry Brigade Combat Team (both brigades of the 36th Infantry Division); and 4th Battalion, a unit of the 45th Field Artillery Brigade administratively attached to the 71st Expeditionary Military Intelligence Brigade. 1-133 is headquartered in Houston, 3-133 is headquartered in El Paso, and 4-133 is headquartered in San Marcos.

From August 2008 to August 2009 Battery C deployed as a filler unit to 3rd Battalion, 133rd Field Artillery (56th IBCT) in support of Iraqi Freedom. Battery C was based out of COB Adder, Tallil, Iraq carrying out the mission of convoy security. During the deployment, Battery C conducted over 120 convoy Security Missions. One member of the battery was awarded the Purple Heart for wounds sustained. Battery C redeployed in August 2009 and was returned to its organic Battalion. In 2011 Battery C was inactivated, while 4th Battalion, 133rd Field Artillery was reorganized into a HIMARS Battalion.

In October 2009, Headquarters and Headquarters Battery (HHB), Battery A, and Battery B from 1st Battalion, 133d Field Artillery were mobilized for service in Operation Iraqi Freedom as part of the 72nd Infantry Brigade Combat Team. After completing training at Camp McGregor, NM as detainee guard force units, HHB and Battery A were deployed to Camp Cropper, Iraq, with Battery B being sent to Camp Taji, Iraq. The brigade completed operations in Iraq in July and August 2010 and redeployed to the United States, with A Battery being the last unit in the brigade to return home.

Since June 2018, members of 1st Battalion, 133rd Field Artillery Regiment have been assigned to Operation Guardian Support assisting the U.S. Border Patrol in non-enforcement support duties. In July 2019, Governor Greg Abbot ordered additional 1,000 National Guard Soldiers to assist in a Supplemental Holding Facility Mission to augment Department of Homeland Security (DHS) operations along the southern border.

In November 2019, 4th Battalion deployed to the Middle East in support of Operation Inherent Resolve. The battalion redeployed to the United States in September 2020. During 4-133’s deployment - its first overseas tour since World War II - Soldiers conducted operations in Syria, Egypt, Afghanistan, the United Arab Emirates, Kuwait, and Yemen, firing a total of 87 missions in support of U.S. combat operations.

In November 2020, 1st Battalion deployed to the Sinai Peninsula in Egypt as multinational force and observers (MFO), tasked with ensuring peace between Israel and Egypt in accordance with the 1979 treaty between the two nations. 1-133 Field Artillery officially assumed MFO responsibilities on November 24, 2020, relieving 1st Squadron, 112th Cavalry Regiment, also of the Texas Army National Guard.

== Lineage ==
Organized 20 September 1899 in the Texas Volunteer Guard at El Paso as the Border Rifles and assigned to the 4th Infantry Regiment as Company B

(Texas Volunteer Guard redesignated 1 July 1903 as the Texas National Guard)

Expanded 18 July 1905 to form Companies B and K, 4th Infantry Regiment (Company B—hereafter separate lineage)

Company K, 4th Infantry Regiment, mustered into federal service 18 May 1916; mustered out of federal service 24 March 1917

Mustered into federal service 11 April 1917; drafted into federal service 5 August 1917

Reorganized and redesignated 15 October 1917 as Company G, 144th Infantry, an element of the 36th Division

Demobilized 21 June 1919 at Camp Bowie, Texas

Expanded, reorganized, and federally recognized 11 May 1922 in the Texas National Guard as the 2d Battalion, 141st Infantry, an element of the 36th Division (later redesignated as the 36th Infantry Division), with headquarters at El Paso

Inducted into federal service 25 November 1940 at home stations

Inactivated 22 December 1945 at Camp Patrick Henry, Virginia

Converted (less Companies F and G), reorganized, and federally recognized 2 December 1946 as the 696th Antiaircraft Artillery Automatic Weapons Battalion, with headquarters at El Paso; concurrently relieved from assignment to the 36th Infantry Division (Companies F and G, 141st Infantry-hereafter separate lineages)

Redesignated 1 May 1949 as the 136th Antiaircraft Artillery Automatic Weapons Battalion and assigned to the 36th Infantry Division

Redesignated 1 October 1953 as the 136th Antiaircraft Artillery Battalion

Consolidated 16 March 1959 with the 132d (see ANNEX 1), 133d (see ANNEX 2), and 155th (see ANNEX 3) Field Artillery Battalions to form the 133d Artillery, a parent regiment under the Combat Arms Regimental System, to consist of the 1st, 2d, 3d, 4th, and 5th Howitzer Battalions, elements of the 36th Infantry Division

Reorganized 1 March 1963 to consist of the 2d, 3d, 4th, and 5th Howitzer Battalions, elements of the 36th Infantry Division

Reorganized 1 November 1965 to consist of the 2d, 3d, and 5th Battalions, elements of the 36th Infantry Division, and the 4th Battalion, an element of the 36th Infantry Brigade

Reorganized 15 January 1968 to consist of the 1st Battalion, an element of the 71st Airborne Brigade, the 3d Battalion, and the 4th Battalion, an element of the 36th Infantry Brigade

Redesignated 1 May 1972 as the 133d Field Artillery

Reorganized 1 November 1973 to consist of the 1st, 3d, and 4th Battalions, elements of the 49th Armored Division

Reorganized 1 September 1979 to consist of the 1st, 3d, and 4th Battalions and Battery E, elements of the 49th Armored Division

Withdrawn 4 March 1987 from the Combat Arms Regimental System and reorganized under the United States Army Regimental System

Reorganized 1 September 1999 to consist of the 1st, 3d, and 4th Battalions, elements of the 49th Armored Division

- ANNEX 1

Constituted 5 May 1917 in the Texas National Guard as the 1st Battalion, 2d Field Artillery

Organized June–July 1917 in north central Texas

Drafted into federal service 5 August 1917

Reorganized and redesignated 15 October 1917 as the 1st Battalion, 131st Field Artillery, an element of the 36th Division

Demobilized 2 April 1919 at Camp Travis, Texas

Reorganized in 1922 in the Texas National Guard as the 1st Battalion, 131st Field Artillery, an element of the 36th Division; Headquarters federally recognized 29 October 1922 at Plainview

Inducted into federal service 25 November 1940 at home stations

Reorganized and redesignated 9 February 1942 as the 131st Field Artillery Battalion, an element of the 36th Infantry Division

Inactivated 26 December 1945 at Camp Patrick Henry, Virginia

Expanded 2 July 1946 to form the 131st and 132d Field Artillery Battalions, elements of the 36th Infantry Division (131st Field Artillery Battalion-hereafter separate lineage)

132d Field Artillery Battalion reorganized and federally recognized 10 July 1947 in western Texas with headquarters at Lubbock

- ANNEX 2

Organized in 1922 in the Texas National Guard from new and existing units as the 2d Battalion, 132d Field Artillery, an element of the 36th Division; Headquarters federally recognized 28 January 1923 at Corsicana

Inducted into federal service 25 November 1940 at home stations

Reorganized and redesignated 9 February 1942 as the 155th Field Artillery Battalion, an element of the 36th Infantry Division

Redesignated 5 November 1942 as the 133d Field Artillery Battalion

Inactivated 18 December 1945 at Camp Patrick Henry, Virginia

Reorganized and federally recognized 12 May 1947 with headquarters at Corsicana

- ANNEX 3

Constituted 5 May 1917 in the Texas National Guard as the 1st Field Artillery Organized 4 June 1917 with headquarters at Dallas

Drafted into federal service 5 August 1917

Redesignated 15 October 1917 as the 133d Field Artillery and assigned to the 36th Division

Demobilized 2 April 1919 at Camp Bowie, Texas

Reorganized 1 June 1936 in the Texas National Guard as the 133d Field Artillery and assigned to the 36th Division; Headquarters federally recognized 9 July 1936 at San Antonio

Inducted into federal service 25 November 1940 at home stations

Regiment broken up 9 February 1942 and its elements reorganized and redesignated as follows:

Headquarters disbanded

1st Battalion as the 133d Field Artillery Battalion, an element of the 36th Infantry Division

(Headquarters Battery consolidated with the Pioneer Company, 626th Tank Destroyer Battalion; 2d Battalion as the 2d Battalion, 202d Field Artillery—hereafter separate lineages)

133d Field Artillery Battalion redesignated 5 November 1942 as the 155th Field Artillery Battalion

Inactivated 18 December 1945 at Camp Patrick Henry, Virginia

Expanded 2 July 1946 to form the 155th Field Artillery Battalion, an element of the 36th Infantry Division, and the 749th Armored Ordnance Battalion, an element of the 49th Armored Division (749th Armored Ordnance Battalion—hereafter separate lineages)

155th Field Artillery Battalion consolidated with Headquarters, 133d Field Artillery (reconstituted 25 August 1945 in the Texas National Guard), and consolidated unit reorganized and federally recognized 10 February 1947 in central Texas as the 155th Field Artillery Battalion with headquarters at New Braunfels

== Distinctive unit insignia ==
- Description

A Gold color metal and enamel device 1 1/8 inches (2.86 cm) in height overall consisting of a shield blazoned: Gules, a bend Azure fimbriated Or between a fleur-de-lis and a Mexican sombrero of the last. Attached below the shield a Gold motto scroll inscribed “DUM SPIRAMUS TUEBIMUR” in Blue letters.

- Symbolism

The shield is red for Artillery. The blue bend, taken from the Dallas family coat of arms, represents the descent of the organization from the Dallas Artillery Company, earlier known as the Queen City Guards. The sombrero is symbolic of the Mexican Border; the fleur-de-lis, service in France.

- Background

The distinctive unit insignia was originally approved for the 133d Field Artillery Regiment on 11 August 1937. It was redesignated for the 133d Field Artillery Battalion on 7 October 1942. It was redesignated for the 155th Field Artillery Battalion on 23 February 1943. The insignia was redesignated for the 749th Armored Ordnance Maintenance Battalion on 14 June 1951. It was redesignated for the 949th Armored Ordnance Maintenance Battalion on 17 August 1955. The insignia was redesignated for the 133d Field Artillery Regiment on 18 January 1989.

== Coat of arms ==
=== Blazon ===
- Shield

Gules, a bend Azure fimbriated Or between a fleur-de-lis and a Mexican sombrero of the last.

- Crest

That for the regiments and separate battalions of the Texas Army National Guard: On a wreath of the colors Or and Gules a mullet Argent encircled by a garland of live oak and olive Proper. Motto DUM SPIRAMUS TUEBIMUR (While We Breathe, We Shall Defend).

=== Symbolism ===
- Shield

The shield is red for Artillery. The blue bend, taken from the Dallas family coat of arms, represents the descent of the organization from the Dallas Artillery Company, earlier known as the Queen City Guards. The sombrero is symbolic of the Mexican Border; the fleur-de-lis, service in France.

- Crest

The crest is that of the Texas Army National Guard.

=== Background ===
The coat of arms was originally approved for the 133d Field Artillery Regiment on 24 May 1937. It was redesignated for the 133d Field Artillery Battalion on 10 October 1942. It was redesignated for the 155th Field Artillery Battalion on 23 February 1943. The insignia was redesignated for the 749th Armored Ordnance Maintenance Battalion on 14 June 1951. It was redesignated for the 949th Armored Ordnance Maintenance Battalion on 17 August 1955. The insignia was redesignated for the 133d Field Artillery Regiment on 18 January 1989.

== Current configuration ==
- 1st Battalion, Houston (Cannon)
- 3rd Battalion, El Paso (Cannon)
- 4th Battalion, San Marcos (HIMARS)

== See also ==
- Field Artillery Branch (United States)
