= Camp Wisdom station =

DART rail station in Dallas, Texas

Coordinates: 32.6665°N 96.7881°W

Camp Wisdom
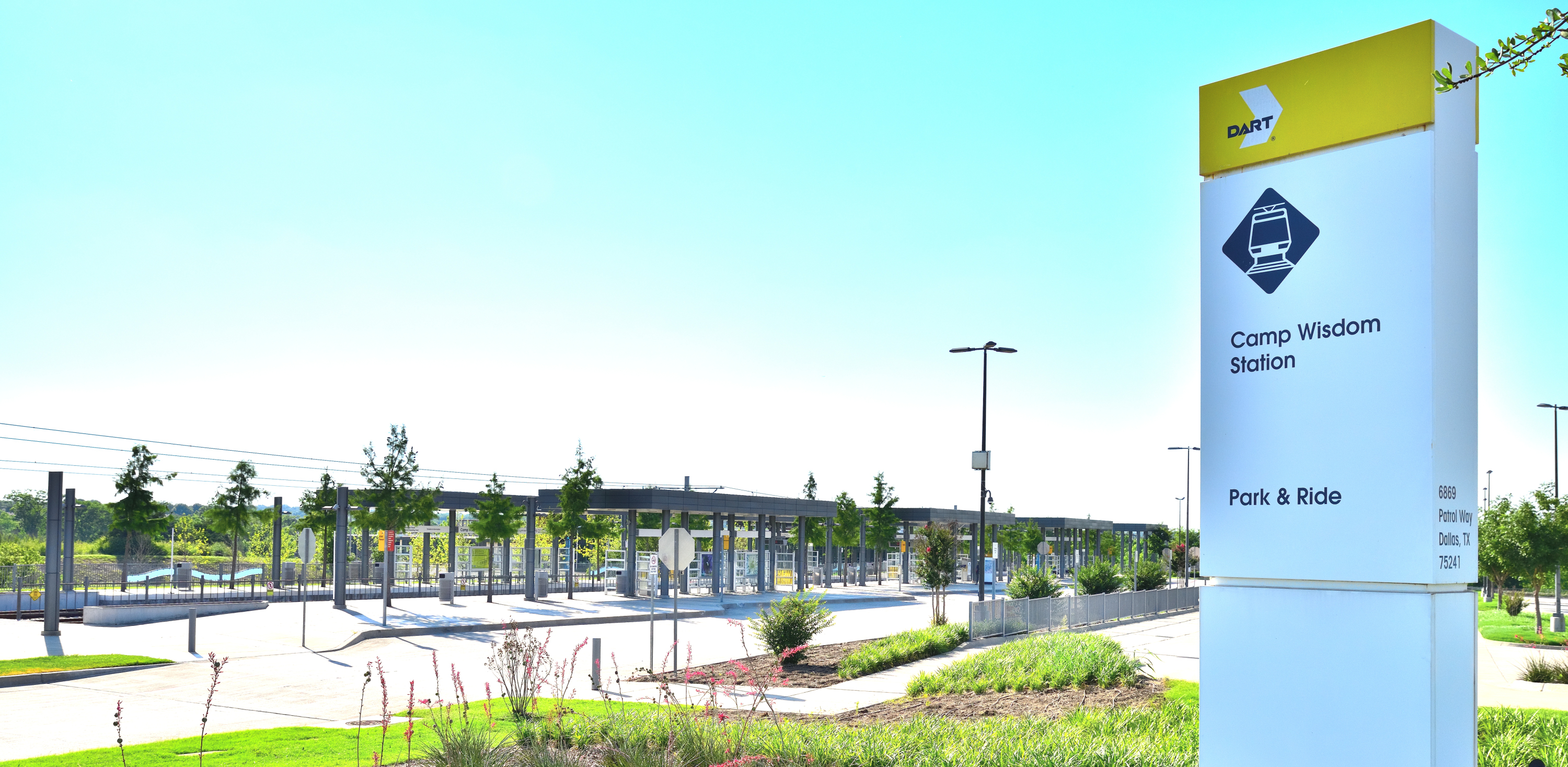

General information
- Location: 6712 Patrol Way; Dallas, Texas
- System: DART rail
- Owner: Dallas Area Rapid Transit
- Platforms: 2 side platforms
- Tracks: 2
- Connections: DART: 108, 141, 145, 228; Inland Port GoLink Zone (M-Sun)

Construction
- Structure type: At-grade
- Parking: 116 spaces

History
- Opened: October 24, 2016

Passengers
- FY 2025: 472 (avg. weekday) ▼2.3%

Services
Preceding station	DART	Following station
UNT Dallas Terminus	Blue Line	Ledbetter toward Downtown Rowlett
Location

Camp Wisdom station is a DART rail station in South Oak Cliff, Dallas, Texas. The station is located on Patrol Way near the intersection of Lancaster Road and Camp Wisdom Road (also known as Simpson Stuart Road east of Lancaster). It serves the Blue Line, four bus routes, and a microtransit service.

The station serves Singing Hills Recreation Center and the Dallas Police Department South Central Division station. Bus routes along Camp Wisdom Road and Simpson Stuart Road connect the station to The Shops at RedBird and Paul Quinn College, respectively.

== History ==
Camp Wisdom was constructed as part of the South Oak Cliff extension, which extended the Blue Line from Ledbetter to UNT Dallas station. A groundbreaking for the extension was held on October 6, 2014, and the extension opened on October 24, 2016.
