= 176th Engineer Brigade =

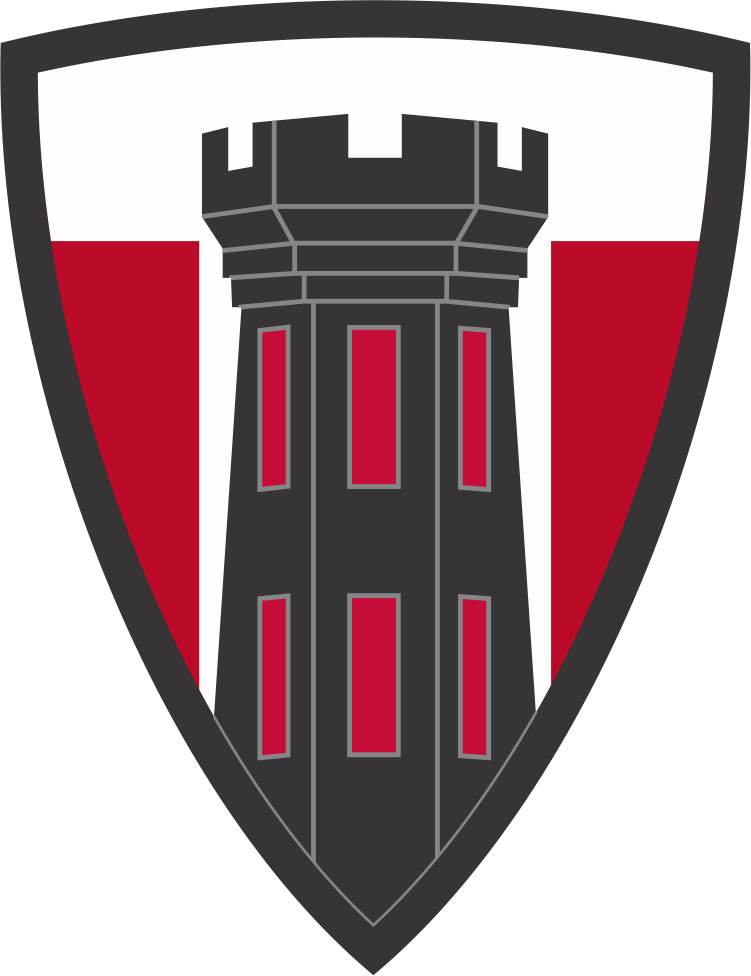
- Active: 2009 – present
- Country: United States
- Allegiance: Texas Army National Guard
- Branch: United States Army National Guard
- Role: Combat Engineer
- Size: Brigade
- Part of: 36th Infantry Division (United States)
- Garrison/HQ: Camp Mabry, Austin Texas
- Mottos: Quod Incepimus Conficiemus (What we have begun, we shall finish) Unofficial: Chaos...with Opportunity
- Website: https://www.facebook.com/176EngineerBrigade/

Commanders
- Current commander: COL Zebadiah Miller
- Command Sergeant Major: CSM Keli Pressley

Insignia
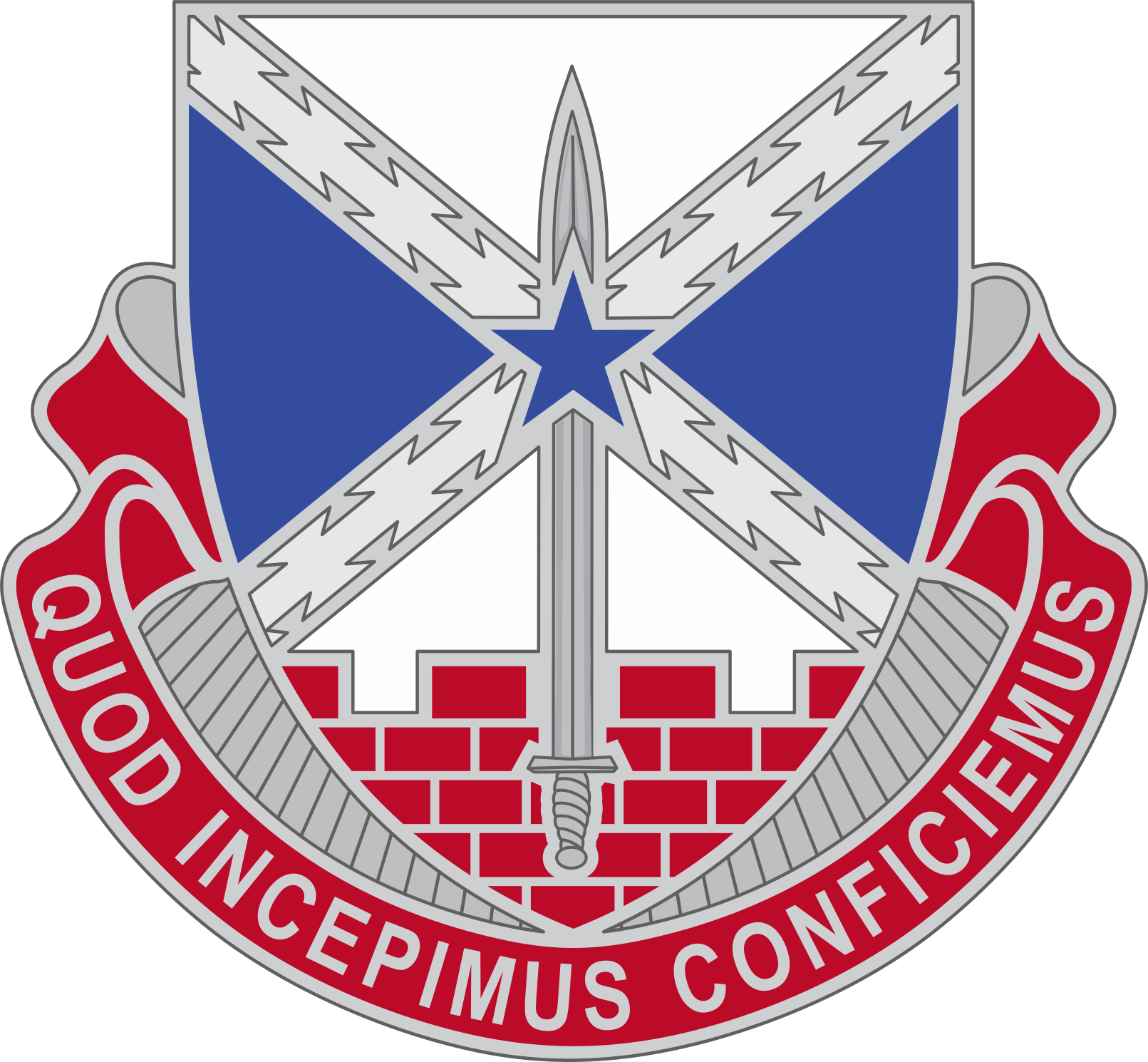
- 176th Engineer Brigade DUI

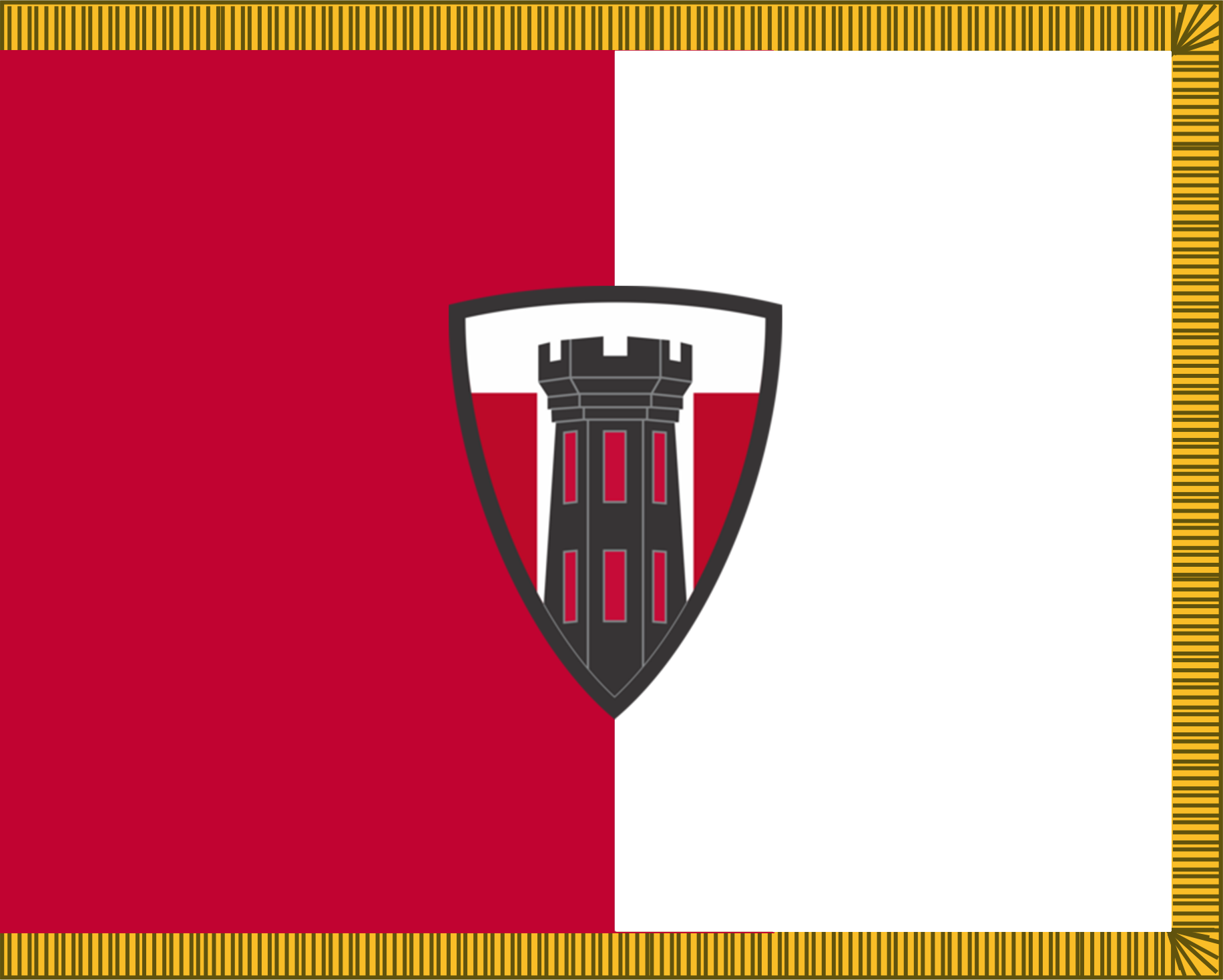
- 176th Engineer Brigade Flag

The 176th Engineer Brigade is a unit of the Texas National Guard since 2009. Their mission is to provide engineering support in combat and community support operations. In 2011 the unit completed a number of construction projects in Afghanistan. In 2016 the brigade sent soldiers to Camp Buerhing, Kuwait to support CENTCOM and Operation Spartan Shield, Operation Inherent Resolve, and Operation Freedom's Sentinel.

== Organization ==
- 176th Engineer Brigade, in Austin
  - Headquarters and Headquarters Company, 176th Engineer Brigade, in Austin
  - 111th Engineer Battalion, at Dyess Air Force Base
    - Headquarters and Headquarters Company, 111th Engineer Battalion, at Dyess Air Force Base
    - Forward Support Company, 111th Engineer Battalion, at Dyess Air Force Base
    - 111th Engineer Platoon (Area Clearance), at Dyess Air Force Base
    - 211th Engineer Detachment (Concrete Section), at Camp Bowie
    - 236th Engineer Company (Vertical Construction Company), in Stephenville
    - 822nd Engineer Company (Engineer Construction Company), at Camp Bowie
    - 836th Engineer Company (Sapper), in San Angelo
    - 840th Engineer Company (Mobility Augmentation Company), in Weatherford
  - 386th Engineer Battalion, in Corpus Christi
    - Headquarters and Headquarters Company, 386th Engineer Battalion, in Corpus Christi
    - Forward Support Company, 386th Engineer Battalion, in Corpus Christi
    - 272nd Engineer Company (Vertical Construction Company), at Camp Swift
    - 442nd Engineer Company (Mobility Augmentation Company), in Angleton
    - 551st Engineer Company (Multirole Bridge), in El Campo
