= 171st Field Artillery Regiment =

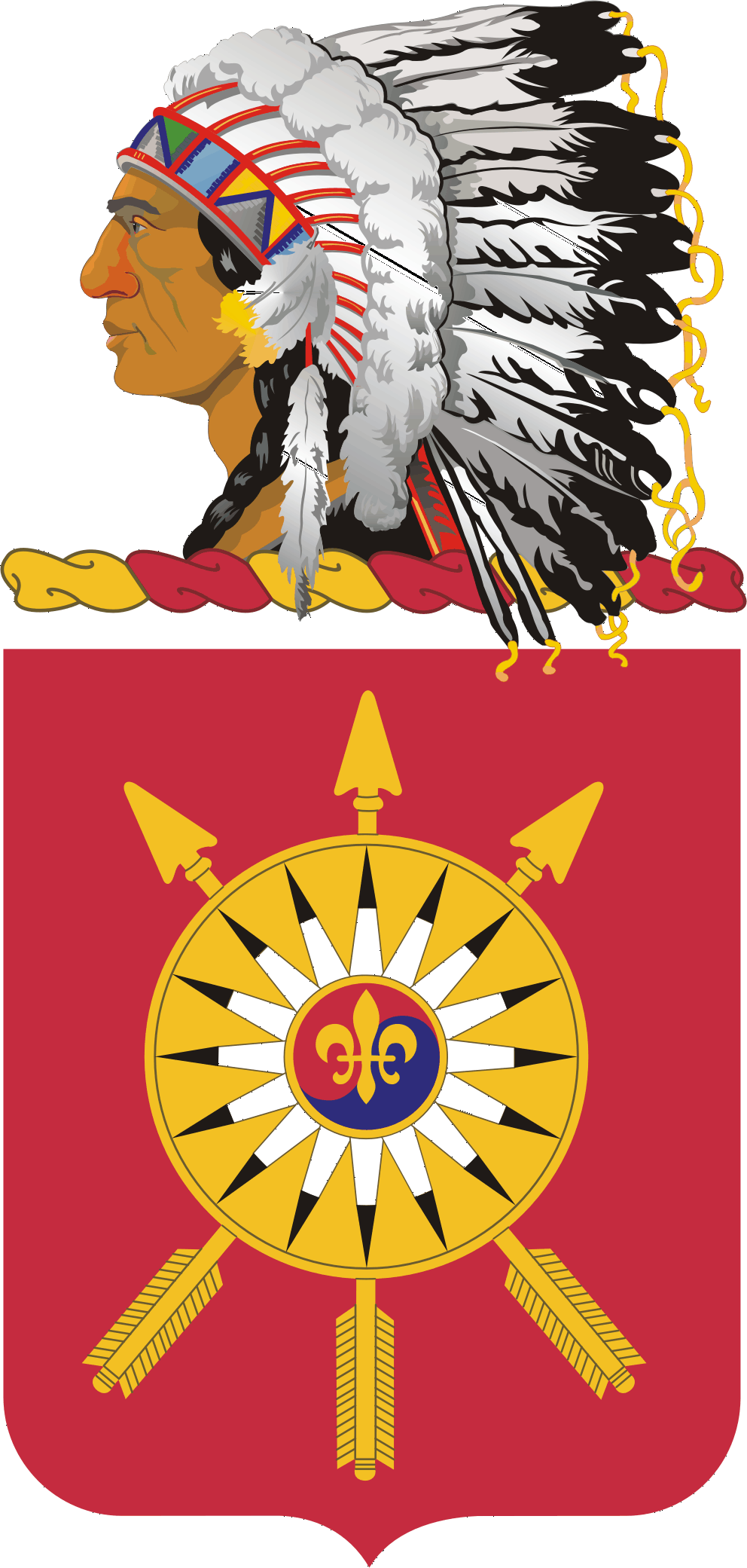
- Coat of arms
- Active: 1963
- Country: United States
- Allegiance: United States
- Branch: Oklahoma Army National Guard
- Type: Field artillery
- Role: Target acquisition
- Size: Battery
- Motto: Eyes of the Artillery
- Colors: Red, blue and gold

Insignia
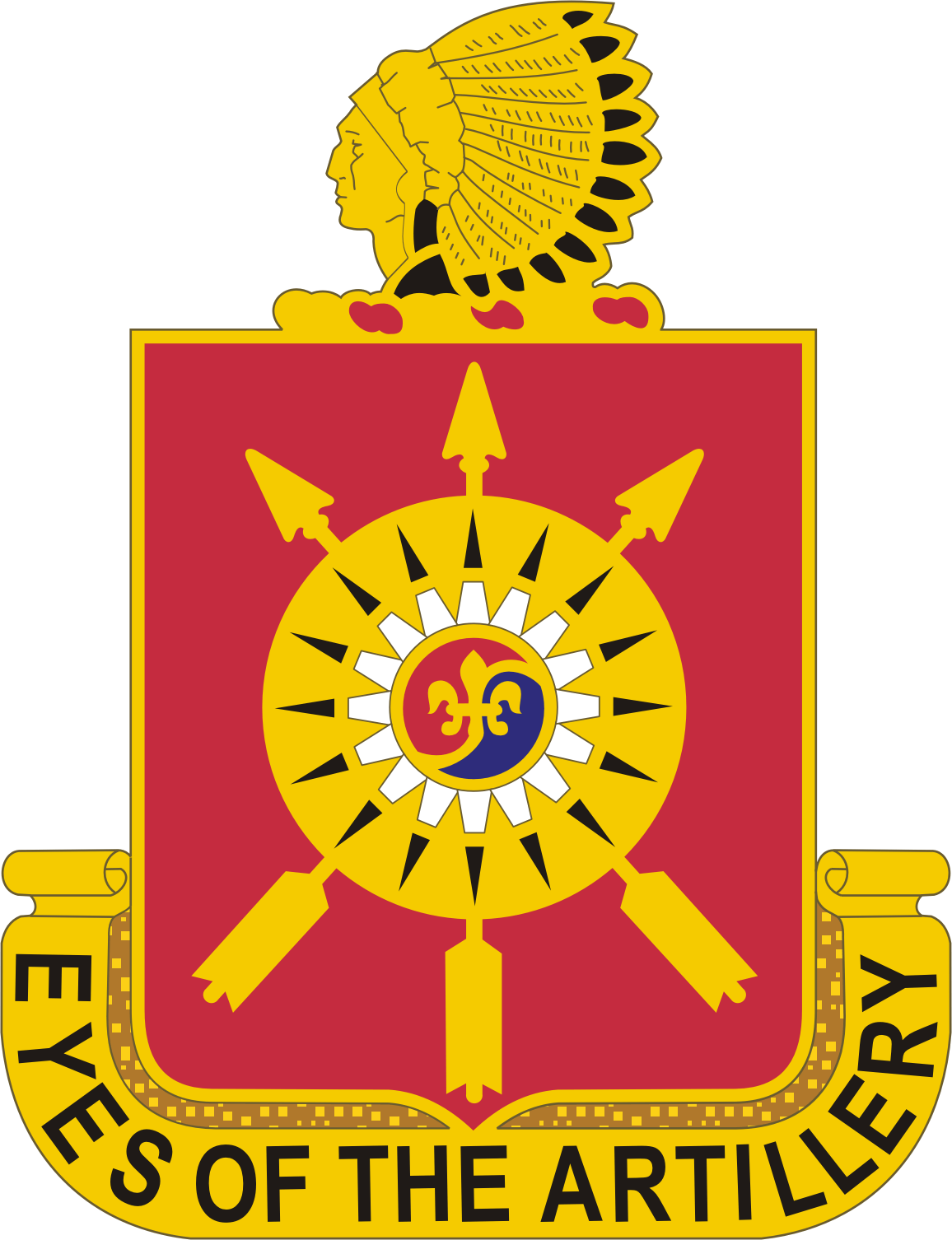
- Distinctive unit insignia

The 171st Field Artillery Regiment is a military unit created from part of the "B" Battery of the 1st Battalion of the 45th infantry division of the United States Army. It was raised in 1963 and is now based at Weatherford, Oklahoma forming part of the 45th Fires Brigade of the Oklahoma Army National Guard. Remaining representatives have been engaged in US anti-terrorism campaigns.

== History ==
The unit was raised on 1 April 1963, at the Oklahoma Army National Guard. Under the combat arms regimental system, it first formed a parent regiment from existing units to create its 1st Battalion as a unit of the 45th Infantry Division. On 1 February 1968, the unit was re-organised and on 1 May 1972 re-designated as the 171st. On 1 June 1989, the 171st was withdrawn from the combat arms regimental system and reorganized under the United States Army regimental system. On 1 December 1991, C Battery was allotted from the 1st Battalion to the Texas Army National Guard. On 3 September 2002, the 171st was ordered into federal service at home stations. One year later, it reverted to state control. On 1 October 2005 the unit was re-designated the "171st Field Artillery Regiment". On 1 September 2008 the unit was re-organised as B Battery and on 25 February 2012 it was recognised at Altus. On 1 July 2010 the unit re-located to Weatherford.

== Unit insignia ==
The unit's insignia was approved on 10 May 1972. It is a gold coloured metal and enamel device, 1 3/8 inches (3.5 cm) in height. It consists of a coat of arms with a shield, crest and motto. Three arrows symbolize the unit's three assault landings at Sicily, Naples-Foggia and Southern France. The arrows with the buckskin shield also symbolize Oklahoma's Indian heritage, (a depiction of a buckskin shield is found on the state flag of Oklahoma). The sunburst design, a favorite Indian symbol, alludes to the unit's mission to provide general target acquisition, survey and meteorological support to the artillery with a corps. The sixteen stylized rays symbolize the sixteen battle honors of some elements of the organization. The fleur-de-lis represents the unit's service in Europe, World War II. The taeguk alludes to the organization's participation in the Korean War.
