= 36th Division Sustainment Brigade =

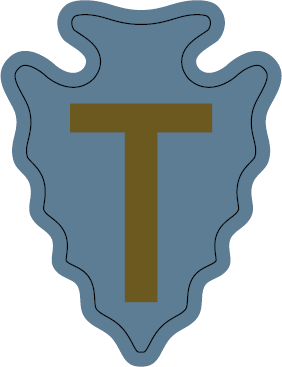
- Active: 2008-present
- Country: United States
- Allegiance: Texas
- Branch: Army National Guard
- Role: Sustainment
- Size: Brigade
- Garrison/HQ: Red Bird Armory, Dallas, TX
- Mottos: SUSTINENDUM IN PAX ET BELLUM (Sustained in Peace and War)

Commanders
- Current commander: COL Sarah Grace Grant
- Command Sergeant Major: CSM Michael Sones

Insignia
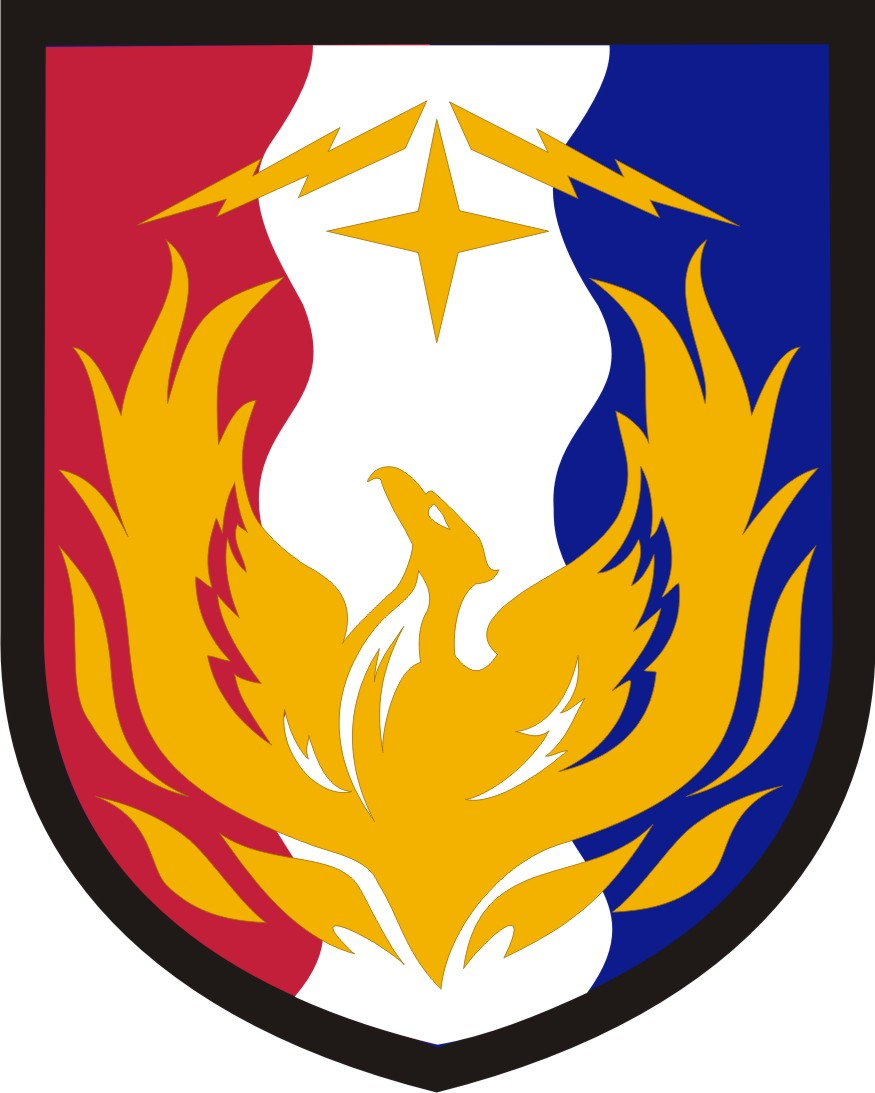
- 36th Sustainment Brigade Old SSI

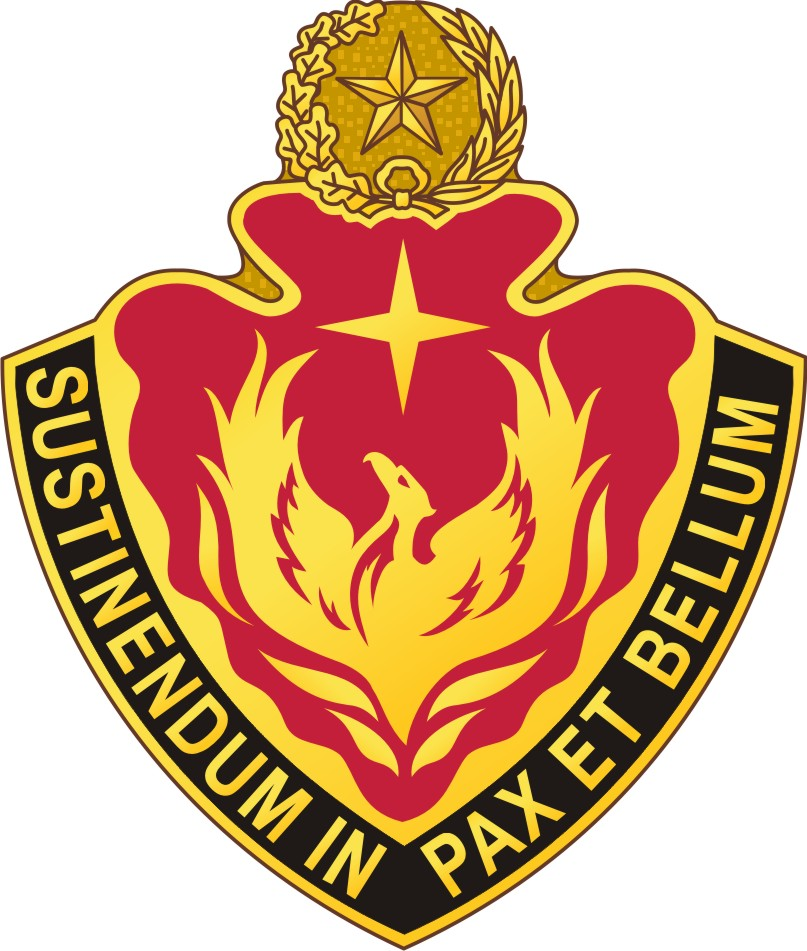
- 36th Sustainment Brigade DUI

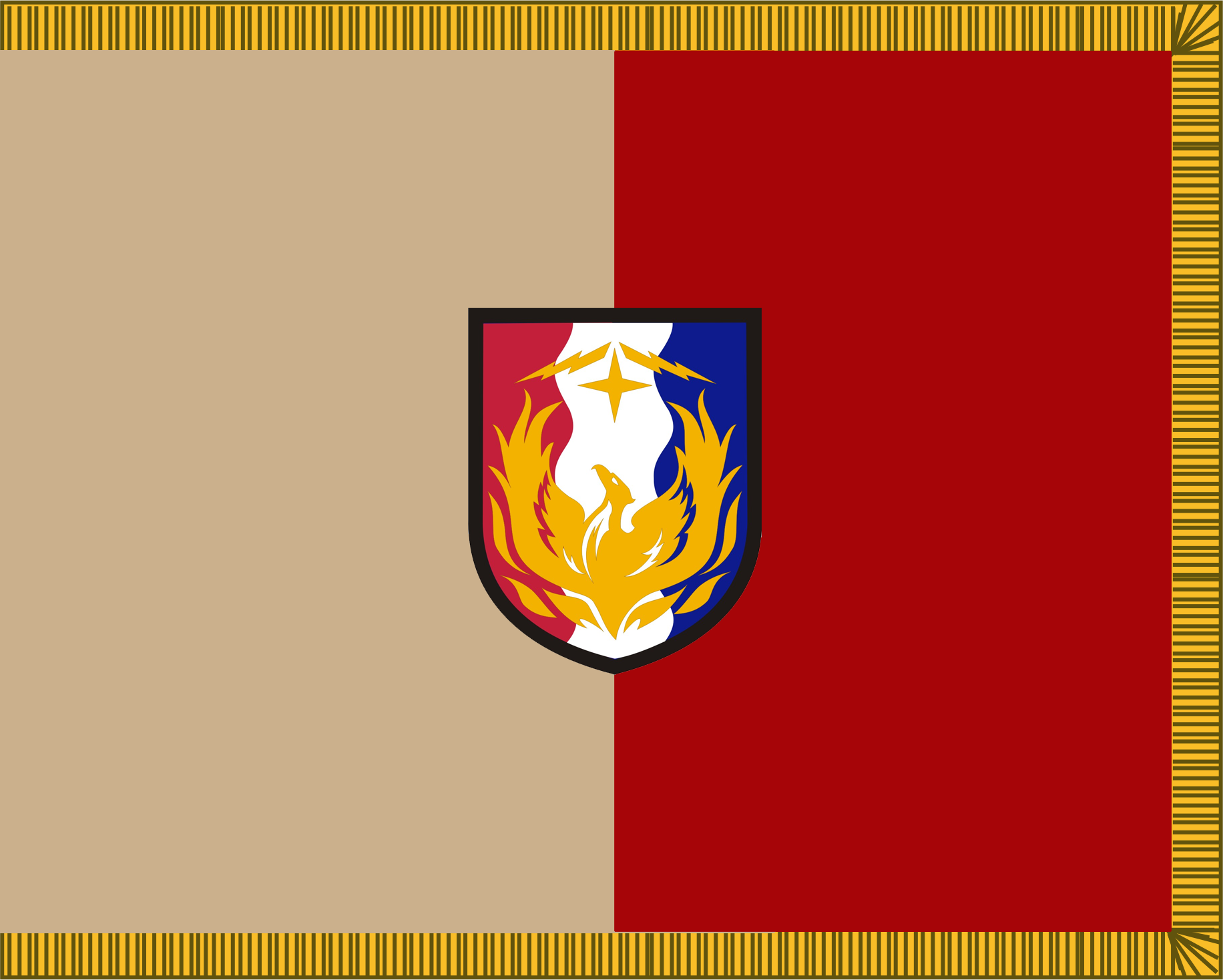
- 36th Sustainment Brigade Flag

The 36th Division Sustainment Brigade is a Texas National Guard unit that was formed in 2008 to provide logistical support to the 36th Infantry Division and its support units including heavy airdrop sustainment operations in conjunction with the Air National Guard. In 2022, the brigade was responsible for logistics and support operations for 10 months at Camp Arifjan, Kuwait.

== Organization ==
- 36th Division Sustainment Brigade, in Red Bird
  - 197th Special Troops Support Company (Airborne), at Camp Bullis (part of 19th Special Forces Group)
  - 36th Division Sustainment Troops Battalion, in Red Bird
    - Headquarters and Headquarters Company, 36th Division Sustainment Brigade, in Red Bird
    - 49th Finance Finance Company, in San Marcos
      - 149th Financial Management Support Detachment, in San Marcos
      - 249th Financial Management Support Detachment, in San Marcos
    - 149th Human Resources Company, in Grand Prairie
    - 449th Signal Company, in Red Bird
    - 1936th Support Company (Contracting), at Camp Mabry
      - 1956th Support Detachment (Contracting Team), at Camp Mabry
      - 1972nd Support Detachment (Contracting Team), at Camp Mabry
  - 111th Medical Battalion (Multifunctional), at Camp Bullis
    - Headquarters and Headquarters Detachment, 111th Medical Battalion (Multifunctional), at Camp Bullis
    - 162nd Medical Company (Area Support), at Camp Bullis
  - 372nd Division Sustainment Support Battalion, in Dallas
    - Headquarters and Headquarters Company, 372nd Division Sustainment Support Battalion, in Dallas
    - Company A (Composite Supply Company), 372nd Division Sustainment Support Battalion, in Corsicana
    - Company B (Support Maintenance Company), 372nd Division Sustainment Support Battalion, in Fort Worth
      - Detachment 1, Company B (Support Maintenance Company), 372nd Division Sustainment Support Battalion, at Red River Army Depot
    - Company C (Composite Truck Company), 372nd Division Sustainment Support Battalion, in Waxahachie
      - Detachment 1, Company C (Composite Truck Company), 372nd Division Sustainment Support Battalion, in Marshall
    - 249th Transportation Company (Light-Medium Truck), in Killeen
    - 294th Quartermaster Company (Theater Aerial Delivery) (Airborne), at Austin–Bergstrom Airport
    - 1836th Transportation Company (Combat HET), at Fort Bliss
