= 250th Expeditionary Military Intelligence Battalion (United States) =

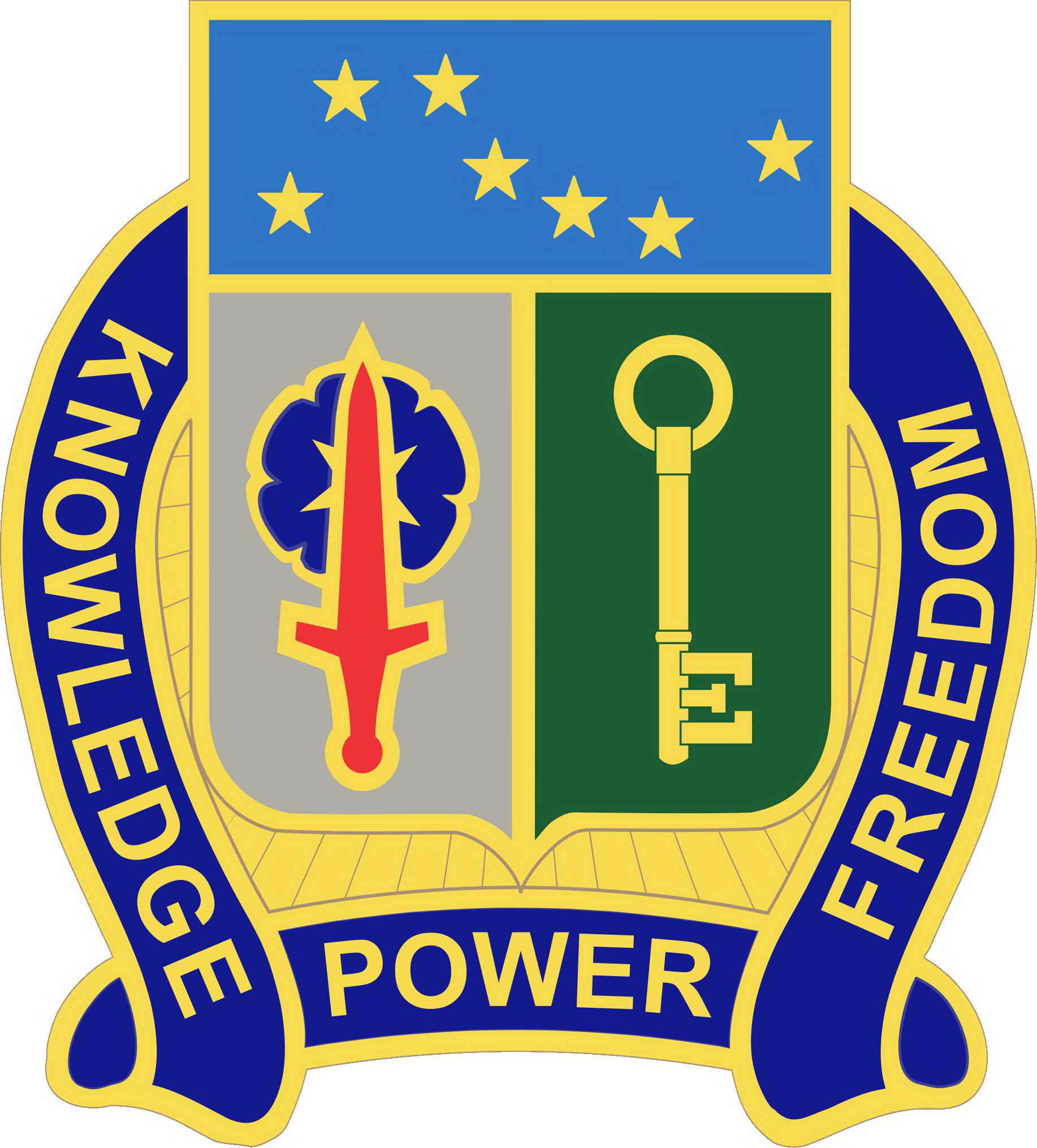
- 250th EMIB Distinctive Unit Insignia (DUI)
- Active: 10 February 1966 - Present
- Country: United States
- Allegiance: California
- Branch: United States Army California Army National Guard
- Type: Military intelligence
- Role: Counterintelligence, HUMINT
- Size: Battalion
- Garrison/HQ: Long Beach, California
- Motto(s): Knowledge, Power, Freedom "Lightning Strikes!"
- Colors: Gold, Silver Gray, Oriental Blue

Commanders
- Commander: LTC John C Goulart
- Command Sergeant Major: CSM Kevin K Hall

Insignia
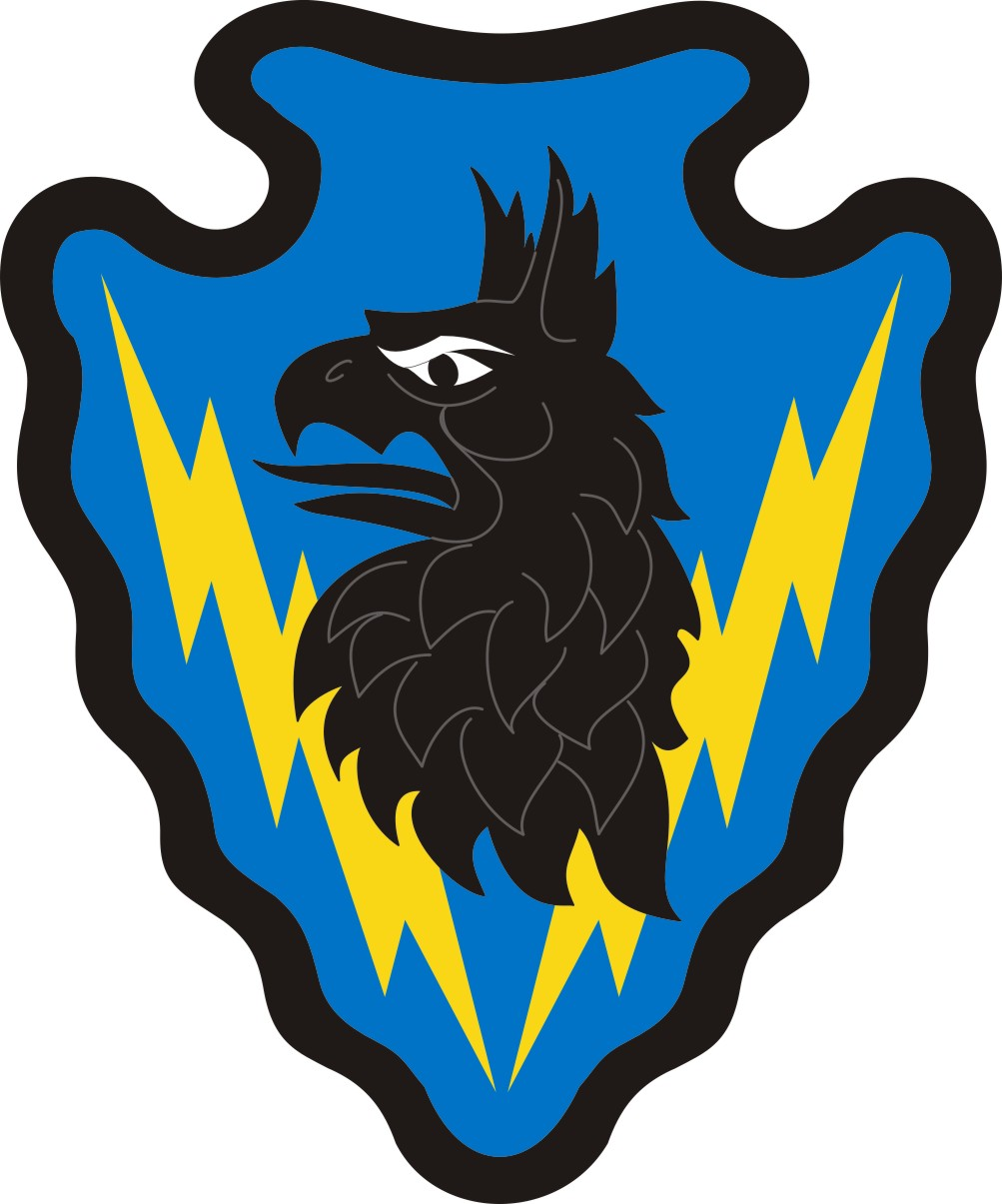
- 71st EMIB Shoulder Sleeve Insignia (SSI)

The 250th Expeditionary Military Intelligence Battalion (250th EMIBn) is a military intelligence unit that falls under the 100th Troop Command of the California Army National Guard, and under the 71st Expeditionary Military Intelligence Brigade of the Texas Army National Guard as part of its federal alignment within the United States Army under FORSCOM.

The mission of the 250th E-MIBn is to conduct multi-discipline intelligence operations in support of echelons corps and below unified land operations. The 250th E-MIBn is designed to receive, integrate, employ, and sustain intelligence enterprise capabilities in support of division, brigade combat team, joint task force commanders, and the rest of the Intelligence Community.

The size and composition of the deployed E-MIBn and its subordinate organizations is dependent on the missions required to be performed in theater. The battalion is also prepared to provide Defense Support to Civil Authorities (DSCA) and respond to domestic emergencies as designated by the Governor of California.

== Subordinate units ==
- HHD, 250th E-MIBn (Long Beach)
- A CO, 250th E-MIBn (CI/HUMINT) (Long Beach)
- B CO, 250th E-MIBn (Long Beach)
- 315th Engineers Vertical Construction Company, 250th E-MIBn (Moreno Valley)

=== Headquarters and Headquarters Detachment (HHD) ===
HHD provides Command and Control (C2) of assigned or attached units for the Expeditionary Military Intelligence Brigade (E-MIBn).

=== Company A (A CO) ===
A CO conducts Counterintelligence (CI) and Human Intelligence (HUMINT) operations in support of corps/division/combined joint task force (CJTF)/Brigade Combat Team (BCT) operations. It consists mostly of HUMINT Collectors and ACI Special Agents.

=== Company B (B CO) ===
B CO, conducts multi-discipline intelligence operations in support of echelons corps and below unified land operations. It consists primarily of Processing, Exploitation, and Dissemination (PED) capabilities and Multi-Function Team (MFT) intelligence support.

=== 315th Engineer Company (315th EN CO) ===
315th EN CO conducts vertical and horizontal construction tasks with emphasis on vertical construction to establish and maintain the infrastructure required to conduct and sustain activities across the range of military operations.
