= 71st Expeditionary Military Intelligence Brigade =

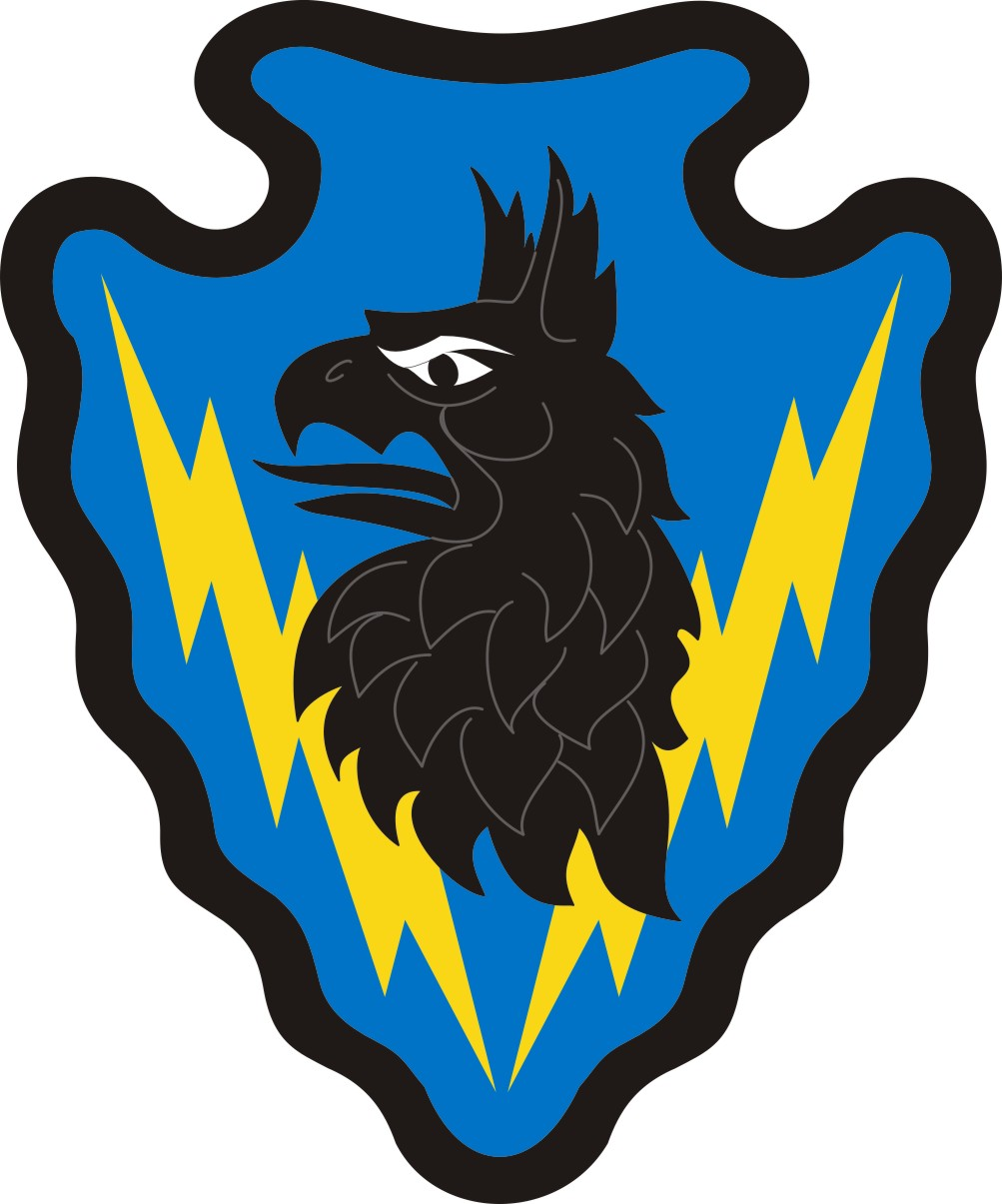
- Shoulder sleeve insignia
- Active: Organized September 2008
- Country: United States
- Branch: United States Army National Guard
- Type: Military intelligence
- Size: Brigade
- Part of: Texas Army National Guard

Commanders
- Colonel: COL Jeffrey Novotny
- Command Sergeant Major: CSM Andres R Canales

Insignia
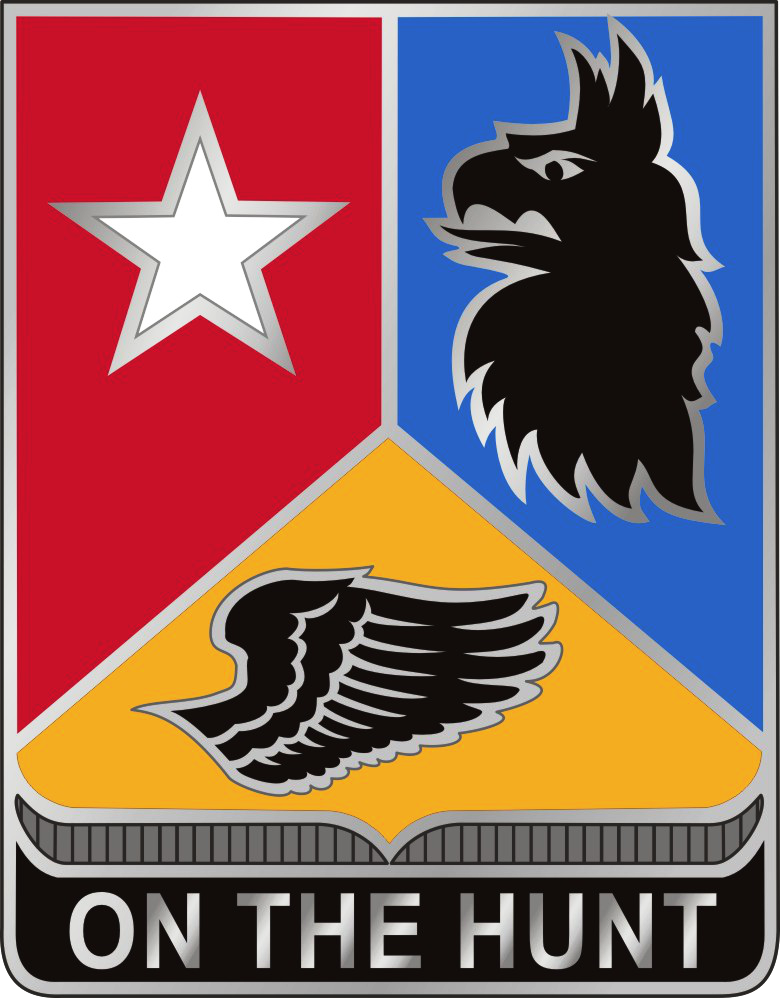
- 71st BfSB Distinctive Unit Insignia

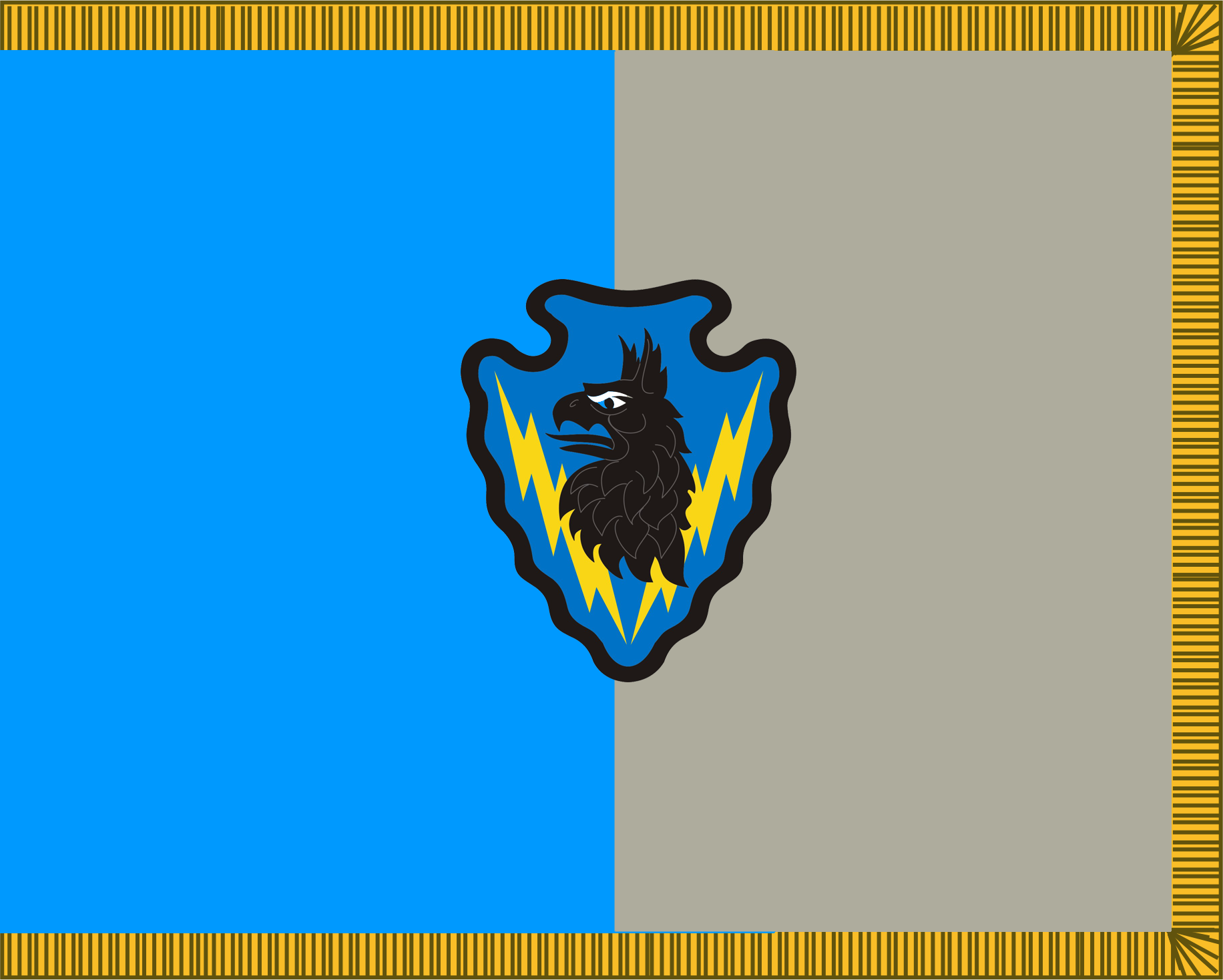
- 71st Military Intelligence Brigade Flag

The 71st Expeditionary Military Intelligence Brigade (EMIB) is a unit of the Texas Army National Guard.

The formation traces its history to elements of the 36th Infantry Division. The 71st was previously a Battlefield Surveillance Brigades (BfSB). The BfSBs were eliminated in 2016 and the 71st was restructured to the EMIB due to doctrinal changes and the inactivation of the 36th Division Artillery (DIVARTY).

It is a separate and distinct organization and is not authorized to claim heraldic links to the previous Texas Army National Guard 71st Airborne Brigade. It is an integrated Intelligence, Surveillance Reconnaissance organization capable of close, deep, and security operations for Army Divisions and Corps; it is capable of small-scale contingency missions when augmented by other capabilities.

== Organization ==
- 71st Expeditionary Military Intelligence Brigade, at Joint Base San Antonio (TX) — (Texas Army National Guard)
  - Headquarters and Headquarters Company, in 71st Military Intelligence Brigade (Expeditionary), at Joint Base San Antonio
  - 250th Military Intelligence Battalion, in Long Beach (CA) — (California Army National Guard)
    - Headquarters and Headquarters Company, 250th Military Intelligence Battalion, in Long Beach
    - Company A, 250th Military Intelligence Battalion, at Joint Forces Training Base – Los Alamitos
    - Company B, 250th Military Intelligence Battalion, in Long Beach
  - 636th Military Intelligence Battalion, at Joint Base San Antonio (TX) — (Texas Army National Guard)
    - Headquarters and Headquarters Company, 636th Military Intelligence Battalion, at Joint Base San Antonio
    - Company A, 636th Military Intelligence Battalion, in Seguin
    - Company B, 636th Military Intelligence Battalion, at Joint Base San Antonio

=== Former assigned units ===
- Headquarters and Headquarters Company (HHC), 1st Battalion (Airborne), 143rd Infantry Regiment

This separate unit is assigned by permanent order under 71st EMIB control; aligned under the active duty 173rd Airborne Brigade Combat Team.

- Companies A, D, and the Forward Support Company are in Texas
- ~~Company B, Bethel, AK 99559~~ (AK ARNG) (Inactivated; personnel reorganized and reassigned to the 1st Battalion, 297th Infantry Regiment, a non-Airborne unit, following a final 5 August 2016 parachute operation). A "new" Company B was raised in Texas from the former Troop C (LRS), 3rd Squadron, 124th Cavalry Regiment.
- Company C, East Greenwich, RI 02818-1728 (RI ARNG - formerly the 173rd Infantry Detachment (LRS))
- Headquarters and Headquarters Battery (HHB), 4th Battalion, 133rd Field Artillery Regiment (4-133rd FAR), San Marcos, TX 76666

This separate unit is assigned by permanent order under 71st EMIB control

- Batteries A, B, and the Forward Support Company are in San Marcos and New Braunfels, Texas
- Detachment 1, Battery B and Detachment 1, FSC, 4-133rd FA are located in Wichita Falls, Texas
- 197th Special Troops Support Company is stationed at Camp Bullis, Texas. It is a unit of the 528th STB, 528th Sustainment Brigade (SO) (A) of Ft Bragg, NC.

This separate unit is assigned by permanent order under 71st EMIB control for admin purposes.

- Company C, 1-19th SFG(A); Company C, 5-19th SFG(A); Detachment 2, Headquarters and Headquarters Company (HHC), 1-19th SFG(A); Augmentation Element 1 & 5-19 SFG(A), stationed at Cp Bullis, Texas.

This separate unit is assigned by permanent order under 71st EMIB control for admin purposes.

- Detachment 1, 640th Translator/Interpreter Platoon. The Detachment is a sub-unit of 640th Translator/Interpreter Platoon, CAARNG, stationed at 4255 IH 35 North, San Antonio, TX 78219

This separate is assigned by permanent order under 71st EMIB control. It reports under the control of HHC, 636th Military Intelligence Battalion.

== Heraldic symbolism ==
Shoulder sleeve insignia

Description A blue (oriental blue) arrowhead shaped device 3 inches (7.6 cm) in height and 2 1/2 inches (6.4 cm) in width overall bearing two yellow (golden light) lightning flashes pilewise, superimposed by a black griffin's head erased with a white eye and brow, pupil black.

Symbolism The arrowhead recalls the historical lineage and association as part of the 36th Infantry Division. The oriental blue is the traditional color of Military Intelligence Corps; the griffin embodies vigilance, alertness, and courage, referring to the unique Soldiers assigned this mission. The contrast of the white and black of the griffin's eye symbolizes overt and clandestine nature of the Battlefield Surveillance Brigade mission. The two lightning flashes represent the extraordinary mix of communication, electronic warfare, and Cavalry, this combined symbology fully represents the speed, agility, and range of target engagement capabilities of the Battlefield Surveillance Brigade force structure.

Distinctive unit insignia

Description A Silver color metal and enamel device 1 1/8 inches (2.9 cm) in height overall consisting of a shield blazoned as follows: "Per pall inverted Gules, Azure and Or, in chief a mullet Argent and a griffin’s head erased Sable with an eye of the fourth (Silver) and in base a wing fesswise of the fifth garnished of the fourth (Silver)." Attached below the device is a Black scroll inscribed with "ON THE HUNT" in Silver letters.

Symbolism Scarlet acknowledges the 36th Infantry Division Artillery from which the Brigade was transformed and highlights the key Battlefield Surveillance Brigade task of targeting. Oriental blue is the traditional color used by Military Intelligence Corps. Gold is the traditional color of Cavalry. The lone star represents the home of the Brigade, Texas. The griffin embodies vigilance, alertness, and courage referring to the unique Soldiers assigned this mission. Black and white of the star and griffin's eye symbolizes the overt and clandestine nature of the Battlefield Surveillance Brigade mission. The distinctive silver outline of all the symbols and boundaries is the heraldic color of sincerity and honesty; this is required to be an effective combination of the unusual skill sets within the organization. The wing refers to the airborne elements and the agile structure of the 71st Battlefield Surveillance Brigade. "On The Hunt" is the motto and is the task of the Battlefield Surveillance Brigade. Stealth, persistence, relentlessly pursuing to trap or kill our targets.

== Short unit history ==
Sept 2008 unit formed – The retirement of the 36th Infantry Division Artillery marked the transition to the 71st BFSB. The 1st Bn, 112th Armored Regiment and 143d Infantry Detachment (LRS) were modified and combined to form the 3d Squadron, 124th Cavalry Regiment. The 636th MI Bn of the 36th Infantry Division was converted from a CEWI-Heavy structure to a "Vanguard" BfSB MI Bn. The 112th Combat Support Company was converted from elements of 1st Bn, 112th Armored Regiment. The 236th Network Support Company was converted from legacy elements of the 236th Signal Battalion.

Oct 2008 first unit deployed – The 636th MI Battalion was deployed to Operation Enduring Freedom for a 350-day tour.

Jan 2009 ADT mission support – The State of Texas tasked all TX ARNG Agricultural Development Support Teams (ADT) to be formed and supported by 71BFSB. Mission support was focused on Ghazni Province Afghanistan and concluded with ADT-VI in Nov 2012.

Mar 2009 special forces assigned – Company C, 5th Battalion, 19th SFG(A) is an 88-soldier unit and Det 1, HHC, 5th Bn, 19th SFGA, 24-soldier force structure was assigned to 71st BfSB by the TXARNG. The HQ of the 5th Bn, 19th SFG(A) HQ is located in Colorado. Its soldiers of Company C remain on rotation to theaters of operations and conduct multiple overseas rotations in support of EUCOM and AFRICOM. As of this writing, Company C has participated in more than 8 joint combined exchange training (JCET) in 11 EUCOM and AFRICOM countries.

Nov 2009 participate in HUMINT/CI events – Trident Lonestar is a recurring training event sponsored by a combat support agency; it includes other country partners, other US services and agencies. 71BFSB continues to participate in and support this training; it has grown to additional country partners and multiple iterations annually.

Feb 2010 translator unit assigned – Det 1, 640th MI Platoon is a 4-soldier structure assigned to 71st BfSB by the TXARNG. The 640th MI Platoon headquarters is located in California. These are native heritage linguists who provide strategic level linguist support to theater commands. These soldiers are perpetually deployed.

Apr 2010 first BfSB-focused training mission – Available elements of the Brigade staff, 3d Squadron (R&S), 124th Cavalry Regiment, and the 112th Combat Support Company participate in the initial iteration of TALON FUSION. TF rehearsal model is an asset integration focused training event. It is a menu-based model that teaches adaptable skill-sets for commanders, staff and collection-targeting assets of the BfSB to focus on the complex requirements associated with Operational Level Reconnaissance missions.

Jun 2010 parachute infantry assigned – 1st Bn(ABN), 143d Infantry Regiment is a 550-soldier (TXARNG), 133-Pax (AKARNG), 133-Pax (RIARNG) force structure was assigned to 71st BfSB by TXARNG. 1-143 is a standard MTOE airborne infantry structure, it is classified as a tactical combat force (TCF) under Army modularity. Line companies assigned to Alaska and Rhode Island train with and deployed with the battalion.

Oct 2011 more special forces assigned – C/1-19 SFG(A) is a 88 soldier and Det-1, HHC/1-19, 24 soldiers force structure was assigned to 71BFSB by TXARNG. 1-19 SFG(A) HQ is located in Utah. C/1-19 soldiers remain on rotation to theaters of operations and conduct multiple overseas rotations in support of PACOM. As of this writing C/1-19 has participated in more than 6 joint combined exchange training (JCET) in 8 PACOM countries.

Nov 2010 3-124 and 1-143 notified for mobilization – Units reconfigure and accept additional soldiers to perform assigned mission. 3-124R&S performed as the multi-mission battalion for JTF-HOA, Djibouti Africa Feb-Sep 2012. 1-143 performed Provincial Reconstruction Team (PRT) security forces mission for 13 separate locations in Afghanistan Feb-Sep 2012.

Feb 2011 begin organic unit fielding of equipment – the BFSB organic structure received required MTOE equipment to fill existing missing and shortage items; this intense fielding effort lasted through Nov 2012. The units continue to receive MTOE and non-MTOE mission essential equipment such as close access target reconnaissance (CATR) items and training to build a focused and functional BFSB.

Jul 2011 special operations support assigned – 197th Special Troops Support Company (STSC), a 162-soldier force structure, was assigned to 71st BFSB by TXARNG. The parent organization is the active component 528th Sustainment Brigade, special operations, airborne (SO)(A), Fort Bragg, NC. Provides a full range of special operations focused support to theaters of operations and is scheduled for first team to deploy in April 2014 in support of OEF.

Nov 2011 71st BfSB unit heraldry – the unit researched and designed shoulder sleeve insignia and distinctive unit insignia approved by The Institute of Heraldry.

Jun 2012 first consolidated annual training – organic elements of 71st BFSB plus the 1st Bn, 143d Infantry Regiment conduct brigade level collective training to validate systems and conduct field operations overseeing a small-scale, but more mature model of the TALON FUSION rehearsal.

Jul 2012 missile artillery assigned – 4th Bn (HIMARS)-133d FA is a 374-soldier force structure was assigned to 71st BfSB by TXARNG. 4-133 is a standard MTOE HIMARS structure and classified as a tactical combat force (TCF) under Army modularity. It received its firing system in January 2013; this was the key enabler to reconstitute this organization after five years of perpetual mobilization support. Has a training relationship with 45th Fires Brigade, OKARNG.

Feb 2013 first brigade dining out – as a part of the commander's readiness workshop the 71st BfSB hosted a consolidated dining out for all assigned and organic units in Austin, Texas.

Mar 2013 special forces mobilized – leadership and key team level elements of C/5-19 SFG(A) were mobilized in support of OEF Mar-Dec 2013.

Apr 2013 redeployed units join the formation – more than 1300 soldiers return to traditional inactive duty training (IDT) status from 3-124 and 1-143 mobilizations.

Jul 2013 the Brigade matures – more than 500 soldiers of the 71st BfSB participate in a challenging annual training at Ft Hood. Units conducted extensive rehearsals in water operations, airborne, raids, and operational level reconnaissance missions. Complex, long-distance communications tasks were rehearsed with exceptional success. Unit SOPs were refined, teams were built, and the unit matured its ability to communicate as brigade level organization.

Sep 2013 more special forces structure – 6 additional captain slots from HQ, 1 and HQ, 5-19SFG(A) were added to the company structures as MTOE augmentation to provide for officer developmental positions during the lengthy special force qualification process.

May 2014 Warfighter – the organic force structure of the base-line 71st BFSB was trained during WFX 14-05A at Fort Leavenworth KS. The organization matured and developed the Brigade staff's understanding and application of collection-targeting assets in a complex rapidly changing exercise environment. The Brigade team received an uncommon positive assessment from the Mission Command Training Center. It was an exceptionally positive learning and growing experience for the majority of the staff.

== Training models associated with 71st EMIB ==
To be posted:
Command Brief Slide Deck
Capabilities Summary
Command 5-year Training Strategy
Operational Graphics describing TALON FUSION and ARROWHEAD FURY rehearsal models.
