= The Shops at RedBird =

Shopping mall in southern Dallas, Texas

- Location: 3662 W Camp Wisdom Rd. Dallas, Texas, US
- Coordinates: 32.65914°N 96.878407°W
- Opened: September 11, 1975; 51 years ago
- Developer: Monumental Properties and Edward J. DeBartolo Corporation
- Owner: Peter Brodsky
- Num. of stores: 110
- Num. of anchor tenants: 4 (1 vacant, originally 5)
- Floor area: 1,084,528 square feet (100,756 m^{2})
- Floors: 2
- Website: shopsatredbird.com

The Shops at RedBird (formerly Red Bird Mall and Southwest Center Mall) is a shopping mall located at the intersection of Martin D. Love Freeway (US 67) and southern Lyndon B. Johnson Freeway (I-20) in the Redbird neighborhood of Dallas, Texas. The mall is the only enclosed shopping center in southern Dallas. It is also one of only two major shopping districts in southern Dallas County, the other being the outdoor Hillside Village in Cedar Hill.

Opened in 1975, the mall declined in the 1990s due to demographic changes and crime, filed for bankruptcy in 2008, but remained open with community and city support and is now being redeveloped by Peter Brodsky into a mixed-use complex with housing, a medical center, and community amenities.

== History ==
=== Opening ===
In 1968, Dallas-based department store chain Sanger-Harris purchased 133 acres (54 ha) of land in southwest Oak Cliff for a 1.3-million-square-foot (120,000 m^{2}) indoor shopping center, which would be built following improvements to the bordering Interstate 20. By 1973, the project had been transferred to a joint venture between Monumental Properties (which had built Six Flags Mall in nearby Arlington) and the Edward J. DeBartolo Corporation.

The two-level mall was constructed using three Triodetic space frames, which allowed for large courtyards with fountains, sculptures, and a small sunken garden. It opened on September 11, 1975. Initially, it was anchored by four department stores:

- Sears, on the east side of the mall, opened on October 1, 1975, replacing an older location on West Jefferson Boulevard. The store closed on January 6, 2019 due to the bankruptcy of Sears Holdings.
- JCPenney, on the west side of the mall, opened on July 30, 1975. At 213,000 square feet (19,800 m^{2}), it was the largest of the four anchors. The store was a replacement for smaller JCPenney stores at West Jefferson and Lancaster-Kiest, though both locations were initially kept open. The store closed in 2001 and has since been demolished.
- Sanger-Harris, on the north side of the mall, opened on June 30, 1975, replacing an older location in the A. Harris Shopping Center. The store was converted to Foley's in 1987 and Macy's in 2006 before closing in 2017.
- Titche's, on the south side of the mall, opened on August 1, 1975. The store was converted to Joske's in 1979 and to Dillard's in 1987. After closing, the store was set to be redeveloped under the name Fiesta Mundo, but the redevelopment was never completed.

In 1994, a fifth anchor was added when Montgomery Ward opened a store between Sears and Dillard's. The store closed when Montgomery Ward went bankrupt in 2001 and was replaced with Burlington.

=== Decline ===
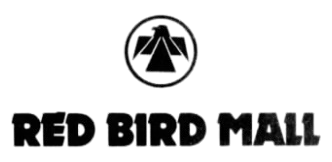
Red Bird Mall logo from 1975

The mall did well in the beginning, despite its location in the relatively undeveloped southern portion of Dallas. As early as the mid-1980s, demographics began to change dramatically in the area surrounding it, and at the same time a perception of crime began to brand the area so shoppers began taking their business elsewhere. And, in 1988, another regional one, The Parks Mall in Arlington, opened just 15 miles west.

DeBartolo attempted to remodel the mall in 1996, in an attempt to rejuvenate the look. It was then sold to Namco Financial, a California investment group founded by Ezri Namvar, who was later convicted of four counts of wire fraud. In an attempt to attract new tenants, Namco gave it a small refurbishment and new name – Southwest Center Mall. The mall changed its name in 1997, and under DeBartolo’s ownership a new food court was added at the northwest entrance, completed and opened in 1998. Costing $18 million, the food court accounted for the majority of the mall’s renovations following the change in ownership and name. During this period, Dillard’s expanded its store from 100,000 to 150,000 square feet (14,000 m²), while Sears fully renovated its location in 1998. Montgomery Ward and J.C. Penney later closed their mall stores in 2001. This marked the beginning of the end of the mall as stores such as Sam Goody and Old Navy (which had moved in in 2000) closed their locations in 2003 with other big name stores following suit including Dillard's.

Namco attempted unsuccessfully to sell the mall to General Growth Properties in 2004.

The property eventually went into bankruptcy in 2008; then foreclosure, the lender Madison Capital picked it up, Cityview Commercial was formed as a partner with Madison. A dynamic General Manager formed a partnership with the city, community, and ownership to assist with the endeavor of turning it around. Much progress was made, the General Manager resigned, and Boxer was hired to manage the property. The former General Manager is slated to rejoin it in April 2011 and is tasked with the final 25% of development and lease up. In 2015, Sears Holdings spun off 235 of its properties, including the Sears at Southwest Center Mall, into Seritage Growth Properties. In 2017, Macy's left the mall leaving another vacant anchor spot as the mall continued its struggles.

On October 15, 2018, it was announced that Sears would be closing as part of a plan to close 142 stores nationwide.

=== Future ===
Although the mall faced bankruptcy in 2008 and ultimately went through foreclosure, The Woodmont Company was hired by the Bankruptcy Trustee to manage it. In August 2008, Woodmont hired a dynamic general manager, which in turn created a team that truly revitalized it. The lender, Madison Capital, picked it up and Retail SWC Mall LLC was formed as a partner with Madison. The City of Dallas hired the ULI (Urban Land Institute) to assess the property and give their recommendations. The City of Dallas then paid to have the six-month option to purchase the former JCPenney building. They did not exercise their option. The former Dillard's building was being built out as a Fiesta Mundo and went into bankruptcy 2011. The general manager created a partnership with the city, community, lender, and ownership to assist with the endeavor of turning it around. Much progress was made, then the general manager resigned; Boxer followed as the management company. The former general manager rejoined it in April 2011 and is charged with the final development and lease up (last 25%).

== See also ==
- List of shopping malls in the Dallas–Fort Worth Metroplex
