= Redbird, Dallas =

Coordinates: 32.677°N 96.878°W

Redbird
- Interactive map of Redbird
- Country: United States
- State: Texas
- Counties: Dallas
- City: Dallas
- Area: Oak Cliff
- Elevation: 498 ft (152 m)
- ZIP code: 75232
- Area codes: 214, 469, 972

The Redbird community of Dallas is a group of neighborhoods located in the southern Oak Cliff area of Dallas, Texas. This is a middle to upper middle class Neighborhood which includes Wynnewood Hills, Elderwoods/Elderoaks/Twin Oaks, and Glen Oaks.

Redbird is the principal area and is bounded by Ledbetter/Loop 12 to the north, Wheatland to the south, I-35E/R.L. Thornton Freeway to the east, and Cockrell Hill Road to the west. The Golf Club of Dallas (formerly the Oak Cliff Country Club) lies in the heart of the Redbird community along with Boulder Park. The community is flanked by the Dallas Executive Airport (formerly Redbird Airport) and the Southwest Center Mall which is under major renovation as the ReImagine Redbird project, as of 2019.
