= Camp Bowie =

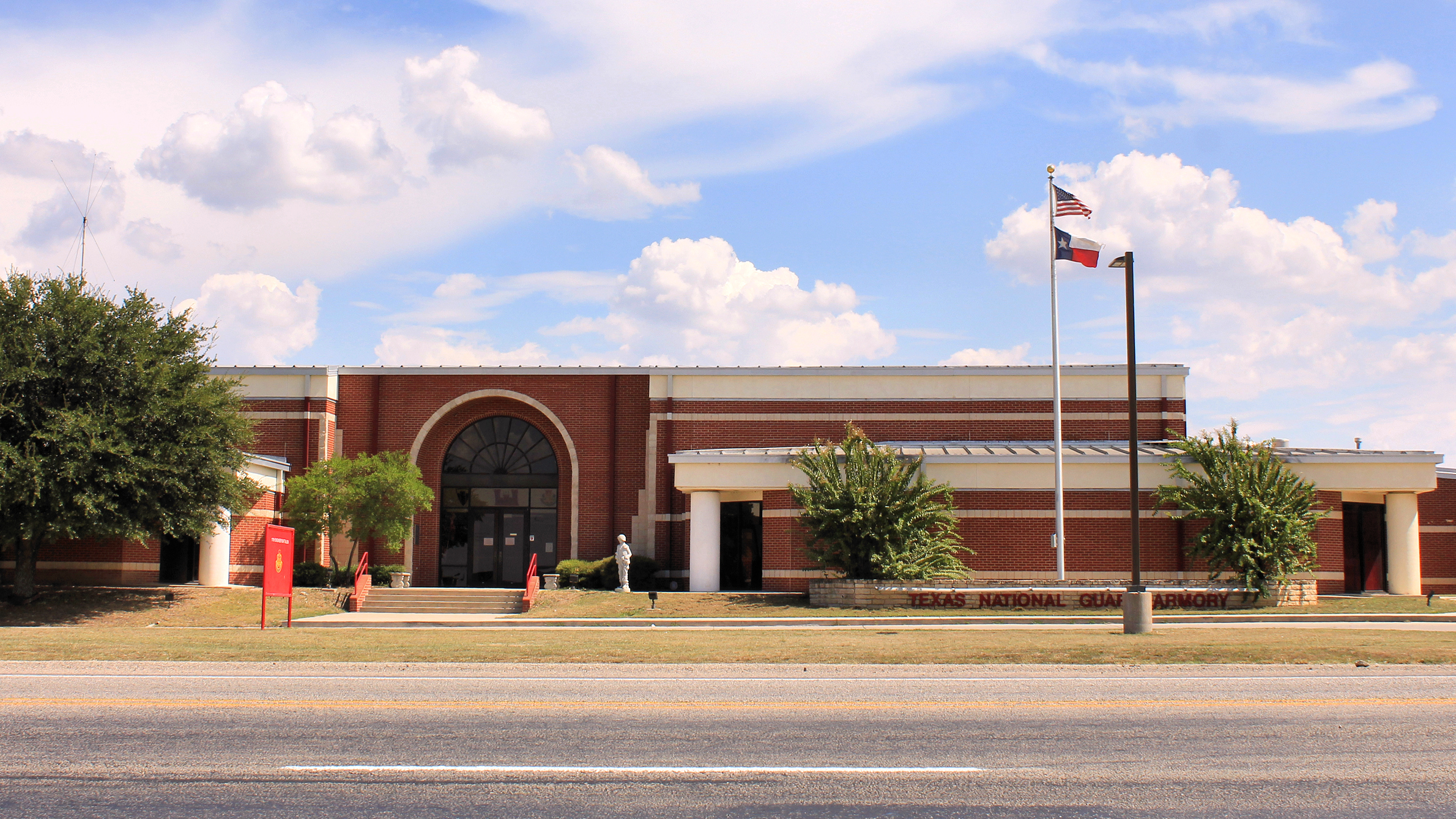
- Camp Bowie Armory
- Nickname: Camp Bowie Training Facility
- Location within the state of Texas
- Coordinates: 31°39′29″N 98°57′26″W
- Country: United States
- State: Texas
- County: Brown

Area
  - Total: 9,297 acres (3,762 ha)
- Elevation: 1,458 ft (444 m)
- Time zone: UTC-6 (Central (CST))
  - Summer (DST): UTC-5 (CDT)
- ZIP codes: 76801
- Area code: 325

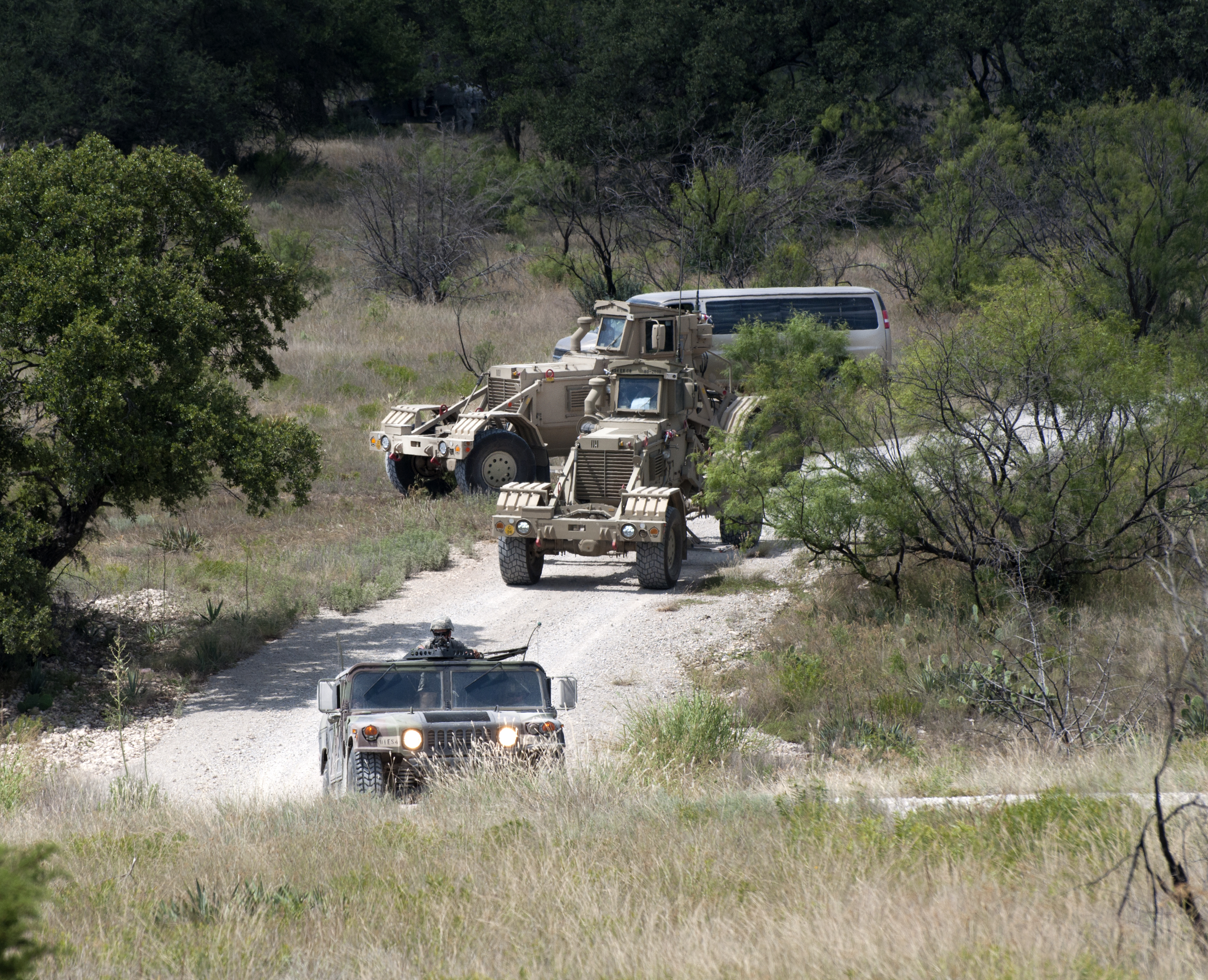
Army Engineer Company training at Camp Bowie

Camp Bowie is a Texas Military Department training center located in west-central Texas just to the south of Brownwood.

== History ==
Camp Bowie, named in honor of the Texas patriot James Bowie, was a military training facility during World War II, and was the third camp in Texas to be so named. From 1940 to 1946, it grew to be one of the largest training centers in Texas.

In 1940, the war situation in Europe caused the United States Congress to determine that the time had arrived to strengthen the defense system. President Franklin D. Roosevelt was handed the power to mobilize the National Guard units. The 36th Division of the Texas National Guard unit arrived at Camp Bowie, located then in Fort Worth, in mid-December for their year's training, but before training was finished, war had been declared.

On September 19, 1940, the War Department announced that a camp would be built at Brownwood, Texas. Work began at the campsite on September 27, 1940. The camp was the first major defense project in the state, with no scarcity of labor when the building work began.

In 1943, the first German prisoners of war arrived; many were members of Erwin Rommel's Afrika Corps. The 2,700 men worked as day laborers for the farms in central Texas.

On August 1, 1946, the War Department notified Texas members of Congress that the camp had been declared "surplus." The Civilian War Assets Administration was to take charge and began the distribution of the land and buildings.

Camp Bowie suffered a large grass fire in July 2008, where several hundred acres of dry, grassy areas of the facility were burned.

Camp Bowie remains an active military training station and recently completed construction of new facilities, including a firing range and several ammunition storage bunkers.

== See also ==
- Texas Military Forces
- Texas Military Department
- List of conflicts involving the Texas Military
- Awards and decorations of the Texas Military
- List of World War II prisoner-of-war camps in the United States
