= 72nd Infantry Brigade Combat Team =

- 36th Infantry Division Shoulder Sleeve Insignia, worn by soldiers of 72nd Brigade.
- Country: United States
- Allegiance: Texas Army National Guard
- Branch: United States Army National Guard
- Type: Infantry Brigade Combat Team
- Size: Brigade
- Part of: 35th Infantry Division (United States)
- Garrison/HQ: Houston

Commanders
- Notable commanders: Irving J. Phillipson

The 72nd Infantry Brigade Combat Team is a unit of the Texas Army National Guard and is subordinate to the 36th Infantry Division.

== Early history ==
The 72nd Infantry Brigade was organized at Camp Bowie, Texas, in July, 1917. A unit of the 36th Infantry Division, the 72nd Brigade included the 3rd and 4th Texas Infantry Regiments. These regiments served on the Mexico–United States border during the Pancho Villa Expedition, and then were organized and federalized for World War I as the 133rd Machine Gun Battalion, and 143rd and 144th Infantry Regiments.

== World War I ==
In July 1917, Brigadier General John Augustus Hulen had assumed command and the 72nd Brigade arrived in France in July, 1918. And then they took part in the Meuse-Argonne Offensive of September, October and November which led to the German surrender. Gen. Hulen was forced to return to the United States due to personal matters and Irving J. Phillipson commanded the brigade until April 1919, when Brigadier General George H. Jamerson took command until the muster out. In early 1919 the 72nd Brigade was mustered out at Camp Bowie.

== Post World War I ==
When the National Guard was reorganized following passage of the National Defense Act of 1920, the 36th Infantry Division was continued as a Texas National Guard organization, with the 72nd Brigade as a subordinate command. Brigadier General George P. Rains took command of the newly reformed brigade in 1922. The Army discontinued machine gun battalions, and the 72nd Brigade consisted of the 143rd and 144th Infantry Regiments. Brigadier General Oscar E. Robert would take command Sept. 9, 1935 through May 20, 1939. At this time Brigadier General Preston A. Weatherred would take command of the Brigade leading into World War II.

== World War II ==
The 36th Division, including the 72nd Brigade, was federalized in 1940 for service during World War II. A 1942 restructuring led to the Army discontinuing the use of brigade headquarters in favor of regiments reporting directly to the division headquarters, and Headquarters, 72nd Brigade was inactivated, though its regiments continued as part of the 36th Infantry Division, and saw combat in North Africa, Italy, and France, as well as in the Pacific Theater.

== Post World War II and Cold War ==
Following World War II the National Guard’s reorganization included the fielding of several armored divisions in anticipation of tank warfare against the Union of Soviet Socialist Republics to defend Western Europe. One of these armored divisions, the 49th, was allocated to Texas and formed around what had been the 72nd Infantry Brigade.

The 49th Armored Division continued in service until 1968, and was activated during the 1961 Berlin crisis.

72nd Infantry Brigade SSI during the Cold War

A 1968 National Guard reorganization led to the inactivation of the 49th Armored Division and the reactivation of the 72nd Infantry Brigade. In 1973 another reorganization caused the reactivation of the 49th Armored Division and inactivation of the 72nd Infantry Brigade.

The 49th Armored Division was inactivated and reflagged as the 36th Infantry Division in 2004, and the 72nd Brigade was reactivated. In 2005 and 2006 the Army’s conversion to modular brigades included the 72nd Brigade’s reorganization as an Infantry Brigade Combat Team.

== Global war on terror ==
72nd Infantry Brigade soldiers and units have carried out numerous active duty missions as part of the Global War on Terrorism, including activations and deployments for Operations Noble Eagle, Enduring Freedom, Iraqi Freedom and New Dawn.

3rd Battalion, 141st Infantry served in Bosnia and Herzegovina in 2001 as part of the Stabilization Force.

In 2005-2006, 800 Soldiers of 3d Battalion, 141st Infantry Regiment, 72d Brigade, 36th Infantry Division deployed to Afghanistan for combat operations. The Battalion was attached to the 504th Infantry Regiment of the 82d Airborne Division.

The 72nd Brigade served in Iraq in 2010, providing security details and mentoring members of the Iraqi Army and Police as they assumed full responsibility for security at Iraq’s borders and within the country.

== Organization 2025 ==
- 72nd Infantry Brigade Combat Team, in Houston
  - Headquarters and Headquarters Company, 72nd Infantry Brigade Combat Team, in Houston
  - 1st Squadron, 112th Cavalry Regiment, in Bryan
    - Headquarters and Headquarters Troop, 1st Squadron, 112th Cavalry Regiment, in Bryan
    - Troop A, 1st Squadron, 112th Cavalry Regiment, in Taylor
    - Troop B, 1st Squadron, 112th Cavalry Regiment, in Rosenberg
    - Troop C (Dismounted), 1st Squadron, 112th Cavalry Regiment, at Ellington Field
  - 3rd Battalion, 138th Infantry Regiment, in Kansas City (MO) — (Missouri Army National Guard)
    - Headquarters and Headquarters Company, 3rd Battalion, 138th Infantry Regiment, in Kansas City
    - Company A, 3rd Battalion, 138th Infantry Regiment, in Boonville
    - Company B, 3rd Battalion, 138th Infantry Regiment, in Lamar
    - Company C, 3rd Battalion, 138th Infantry Regiment, in West Plains
    - Company D (Weapons), 3rd Battalion, 138th Infantry Regiment, in Clinton
  - 1st Battalion, 141st Infantry Regiment, at Camp Bullis
    - Headquarters and Headquarters Company, 1st Battalion, 141st Infantry Regiment, at Camp Bullis
    - Company A, 1st Battalion, 141st Infantry Regiment, in Hondo
    - Company B, 1st Battalion, 141st Infantry Regiment, in San Marcos
    - Company C, 1st Battalion, 141st Infantry Regiment, in Fredericksburg
    - Company D (Weapons), 1st Battalion, 141st Infantry Regiment, at Camp Bullis
  - 3rd Battalion, 141st Infantry Regiment, in Weslaco
    - Headquarters and Headquarters Company, 3rd Battalion, 141st Infantry Regiment, in Weslaco
    - Company A, 3rd Battalion, 141st Infantry Regiment, in Brownsville
    - Company B, 3rd Battalion, 141st Infantry Regiment, in Laredo
    - Company C, 3rd Battalion, 141st Infantry Regiment, in Weslaco
    - Company D (Weapons), 3rd Battalion, 141st Infantry Regiment, in Victoria
  - 3rd Squadron, 278th Armored Cavalry Regiment, in Temple (part of 278th Armored Cavalry Regiment)
    - Headquarters and Headquarters Troop, 3rd Squadron, 278th Armored Cavalry Regiment, in Temple
    - Troop H (Forward Support), Regimental Support Squadron, 278th Armored Cavalry Regiment, in Temple
    - Troop I (Tank), 3rd Squadron, 278th Armored Cavalry Regiment, at Fort Hood
    - Troop K (Tank), 3rd Squadron, 278th Armored Cavalry Regiment, in Temple
    - Troop L (Mechanized Infantry), 3rd Squadron, 278th Armored Cavalry Regiment, in Temple
  - 1st Battalion, 133rd Field Artillery Regiment, in Houston
    - Headquarters and Headquarters Battery, 1st Battalion, 133rd Field Artillery Regiment, in Houston
    - Battery A, 1st Battalion, 133rd Field Artillery Regiment, in Lufkin
    - Battery B, 1st Battalion, 133rd Field Artillery Regiment, in Lufkin
    - Battery C, 1st Battalion, 133rd Field Artillery Regiment, at Houston
  - 172nd Brigade Engineer Battalion, in Houston
    - Headquarters and Headquarters Company, 172nd Brigade Engineer Battalion, in Houston
    - Company A (Combat Engineer), 172nd Brigade Engineer Battalion, in Brenham
    - Company B (Combat Engineer), 172nd Brigade Engineer Battalion, in Angleton
    - Company C (Signal), 172nd Brigade Engineer Battalion, in Houston
    - Company D (Military Intelligence), 172nd Brigade Engineer Battalion, in Houston
      - Detachment 1, Company D (Military Intelligence), 172nd Brigade Engineer Battalion, at Fort Hood (RQ-28A UAV)
  - 536th Brigade Support Battalion, in Huntsville
    - Headquarters and Headquarters Company, 536th Brigade Support Battalion, in Huntsville
    - Company A (Distribution), 536th Brigade Support Battalion, in Houston
      - Detachment 1, Company A (Distribution), 536th Brigade Support Battalion, in Weslaco
    - Company B (Maintenance), 536th Brigade Support Battalion, in Killeen
    - Company C (Medical), 536th Brigade Support Battalion, in La Marque
    - Company D (Forward Support), 536th Brigade Support Battalion, in Bryan — attached to 1st Squadron, 112th Cavalry Regiment
    - Company E (Forward Support), 536th Brigade Support Battalion, in Houston — attached to 172nd Brigade Engineer Battalion
    - Company F (Forward Support), 536th Brigade Support Battalion, in Houston — attached to 1st Battalion, 133rd Field Artillery Regiment
    - Company G (Forward Support), 536th Brigade Support Battalion, at Camp Bullis — attached to 1st Battalion, 141st Infantry Regiment
    - Company H (Forward Support), 536th Brigade Support Battalion, in Weslaco — attached to 3rd Battalion, 141st Infantry Regiment
    - Company I (Forward Support), 536th Brigade Support Battalion, in Jefferson City (MO) — attached to 3rd Battalion, 138th Infantry Regiment (Missouri Army National Guard)

== External resources ==
- 72nd Infantry Brigade Combat Team at Facebook
