= William Ruthven Smith =

United States general (1868–1941)

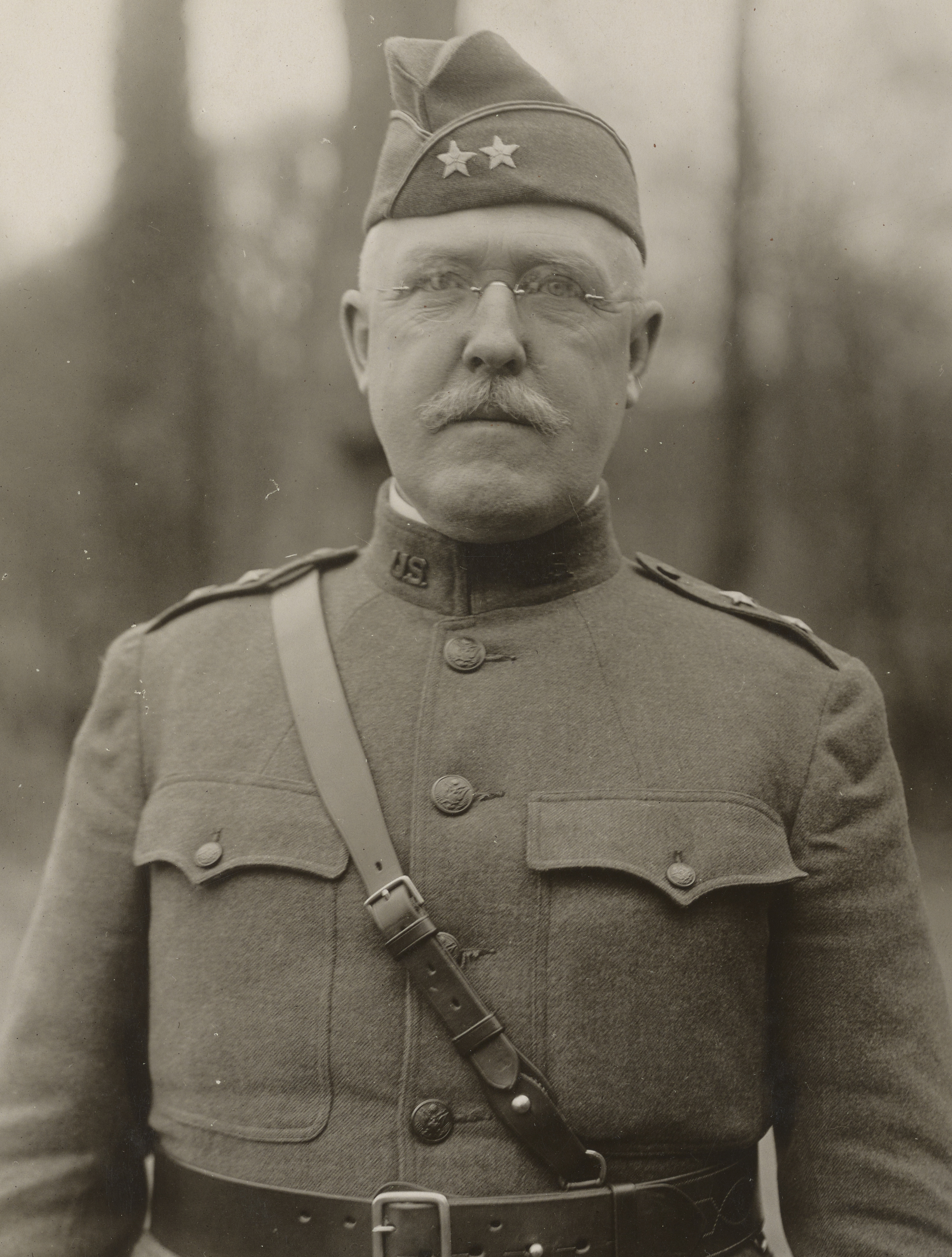
- Smith as 36th Division commander c. December 1918
- Born: April 2, 1868; Nashville, Tennessee, United States
- Died: July 15, 1941 (aged 73); Sewanee, Tennessee, United States
- Military career
- Allegiance: United States
- Branch: United States Army
- Service years: 1892–1932
- Rank: Major General
- Service number: 0-71
- Units: Field Artillery Branch; Coast Artillery Corps
- Commands: 62nd Field Artillery Brigade; 37th Division; 36th Division; Superintendent of the United States Military Academy
- Conflicts: World War I
- Awards: Army Distinguished Service Medal

Major General William Ruthven Smith (April 2, 1868 – July 15, 1941) was a career United States Army officer who commanded the 36th Division during its deployment in France during the final months of World War I. He later became Superintendent of the United States Military Academy at West Point, New York.

== Early life ==
William Ruthven Smith was born on April 2, 1868, in Nashville, Tennessee, son of Robert McPhail and Lititia (Trimble) Smith. The younger Smith attended Vanderbilt University and was appointed to the United States Military Academy from his native state, graduating 10th out of 62 cadets in his class of 1892. His classmates included numerous men who would later attain general officer rank, such as Charles Pelot Summerall, Tracy Campbell Dickson, Frank W. Coe, Julian Robert Lindsey, James Ancil Shipton, Louis Chapin Covell, Preston Brown, George Blakely, Robert Mearns, Peter Weimer Davison, Howard Russell Hickok, Henry Howard Whitney, John E. Woodward, John McAuley Palmer and George Columbus Barnhardt.

== Military career ==
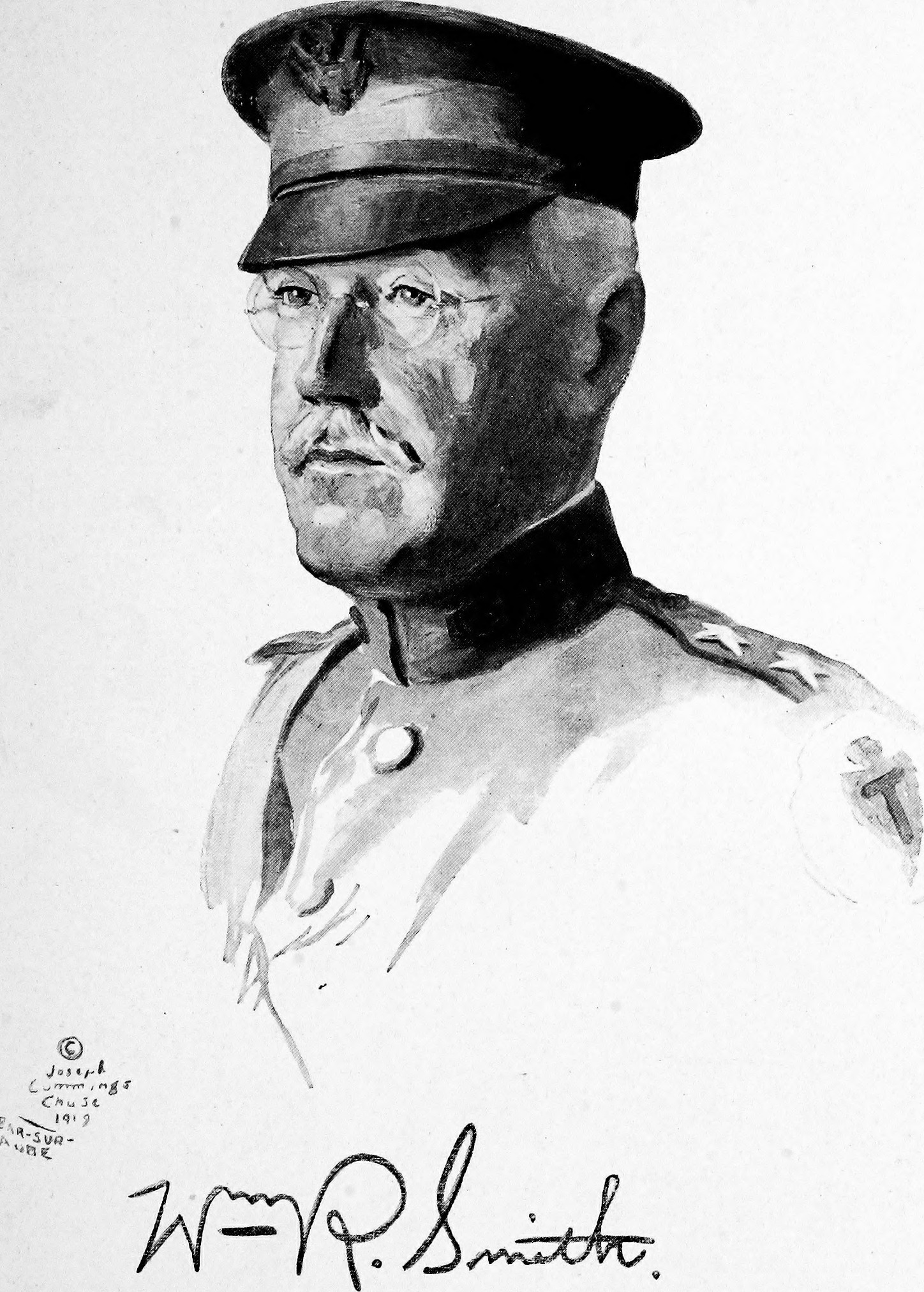
Portrait of Major General William Ruthven Smith.

Smith's early postings alternated between garrison service in field artillery and teaching at West Point as instructor of the separate subjects of chemistry, mathematics, ordnance, and gunnery. Made captain of the new Coast Artillery Corps in 1901, he was a student of the school of submarine defense and commanded Fort Monroe in 1908. In December 1901, Smith married Mary Prince Davis, the daughter of Brigadier General George B. Davis. They were the parents of two children who died young and two who lived to adulthood, Katherine Alexander Smith and Colonel William R. Smith Jr. In the years preceding World War I, Smith commanded anti-submarine technology schools and departments, in early 1917 stretching "the first submarine net put down in America, 2000 yards long, 84 feet at deepest point, extending from Fort Monroe to Fort Wool and closing entrance to Hampton Roads"

Promoted to colonel of the Coast Artillery Corps in May, 1917, the month following the American entry into World War I, Smith was made a brigadier general of the National Army and assigned to train the 62nd Field Artillery Brigade, part of the 37th Division (Ohio National Guard). After training that command for nine months at Camp Sheridan, Alabama, Smith traveled with the Guard unit to its embarkation for Europe, but was left on the docks when their ships departed on June 10, 1918, by order of the War Department.

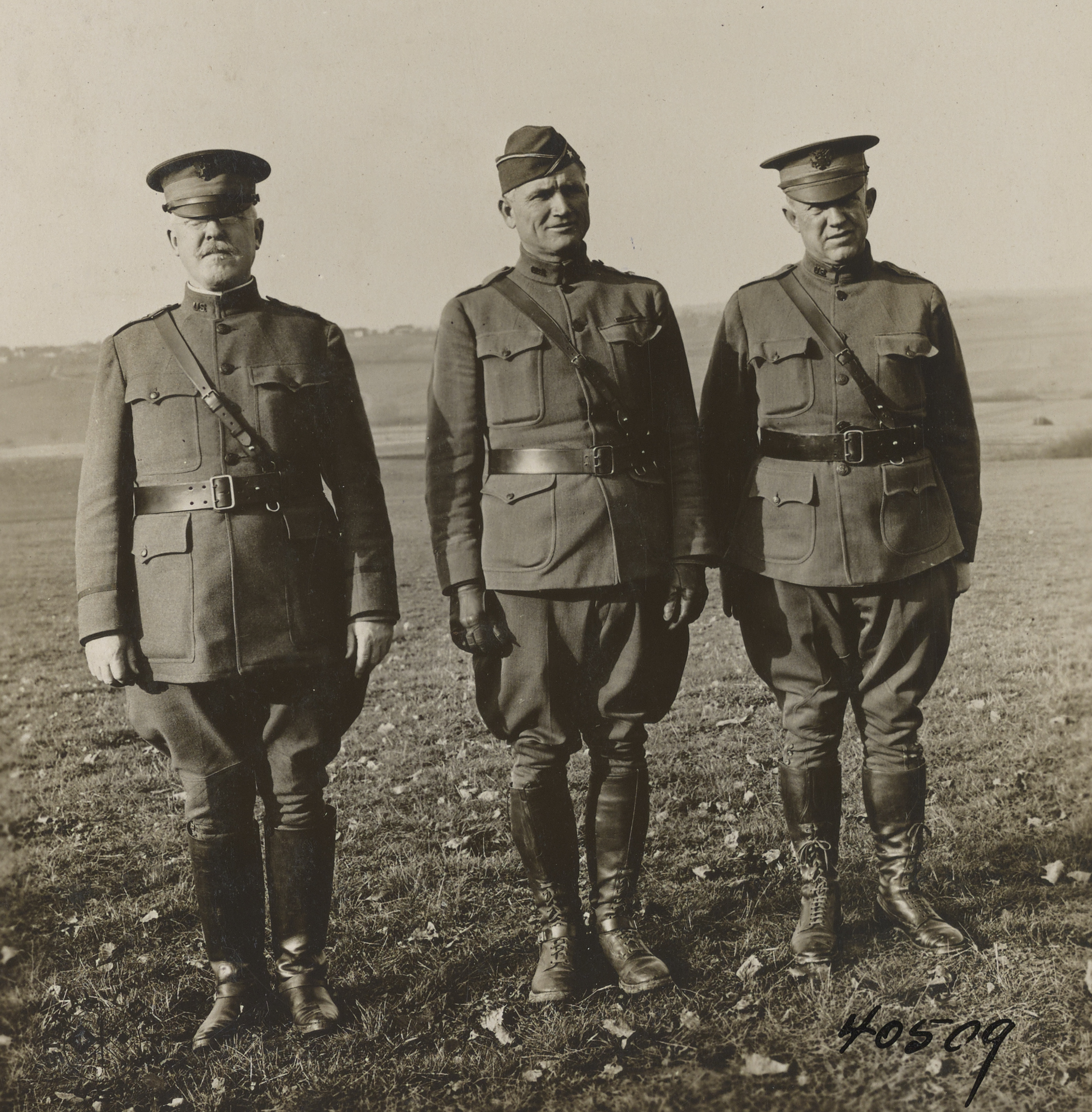
The commander of the 36th Division, Major General William R. Smith (left), together with his two infantry brigade commanders, Brigadier General John A. Hulen, commanding the 71st Brigade, and Brigadier General Pegram Whitworth, commanding the 72nd Brigade, pictured here at Lignieres, Yonne, France, December 8, 1918.

Smith was given command of the 36th Division and promoted to major general of the National Army in the summer of 1918. After arriving in Brest, France, the 36th Division, Smith established a combat course for training at Bar-sur-Aube. In October, Smith led the 36th Division while with the 2nd Division it was attached to the French Fourth Army under Henri Gouraud on its push to the Aisne River. Smith remained in command of the division's demobilization in June 1919, seven months after the Armistice with Germany, when his National Army rank dissolved, his rank reverted again to colonel, U.S. Army. For his service during the war he was awarded the Army Distinguished Service Medal, the citation for which reads:

The President of the United States of America, authorized by Act of Congress, July 9, 1918, takes pleasure in presenting the Army Distinguished Service Medal to Brigadier General William Ruthven Smith, United States Army, for exceptionally meritorious and distinguished services to the Government of the United States, in a duty of great responsibility during World War I. As Commanding General, 36th Division, by his thorough and ceaseless efforts, coupled with a keen insight into the principles of military training, General Smith brought his division to such a high standard of discipline and proficiency as to achieve conspicuous results in a major operation without previous service under fire. The excellent conduct of his division subsequent to the signing of the armistice reflects great credit on him. His services have been of great value to the American Expeditionary Forces.

After promotion again to brigadier general, this time of the regular army, Smith served in several garrison commands in the Philippines, Fort Sam Houston, Fort Monroe again, and Honolulu, Hawaii, then returned to the United States Military Academy, this time to occupy the superintendent's billet, which he did from 1928 until 1932. During his tour as superintendent, Smith helped secure Stewart Field in nearby Newburgh, New York as a base for the Army Air Corps and USMA pilot training. Also during this period, his aide-de-camp was Floyd Lavinius Parks, who became a lieutenant general after World War II.

== Civilian career ==
After retirement, Smith returned to his native state of Tennessee, settling in Sewanee where he became superintendent of the local military academy (now St. Andrew's-Sewanee School) and served in that capacity until his death.

== Death and legacy ==
He died on July 15, 1941, in West Point, New York. Battery Smith at Fort Miles, Delaware (also called Battery 118) was named for him, armed with two 16-inch guns.

== Bibliography ==
- Bryant, James C. (1993). "7: War Years at West Point". A Gift for Giving:the story of Lamar Rich Plunkett. Mercer University Press. p. 181. ISBN 978-0-86554-430-7.
- Cullum, George Washington (1920). Biographical register of the officers and graduates of the U.S. Military Academy at West Point, N.Y.: from its establishment, in 1802, to 1890, with the early history of the United States Military Academy. 3459. Vol. 5. Edward Singleton Holden, Charles Braden, Wirt Robinson (3 ed.). New York: Houghton Mifflin. p. 620.
- Davis, Henry Blaine Jr. (1998). Generals in Khaki. Raleigh, North Carolina: Pentland Press. ISBN 1571970886. OCLC 40298151.
- Texas State Historical Association. "William Ruthven Smith". Handbook of Texas Online.
- Lonnie J., White (1999). "36th Division in World War I". Military History Associates.
- Wardrop, G. Douglas, ed. (June 1922). "Army and Navy Aeronautics". Aerial Age Weekly. 15 (16). New York: Aerial Age Company: 416.

Military offices
| Preceded by Edwin St. John Greble (last permanent commander) | Commanding General 36th Division; 1918–1919 | Succeeded by Post deactivated |
| Preceded by Edwin B. Winans | Superintendent of the United States Military Academy; 1929–1932 | Succeeded by William D. Connor |
