= Hulen (surname) =

Hulen is a surname. Notable people with the surname include:

- Billy Hulen (1870–1947), American baseball player
- John Augustus Hulen (1871–1957), American lieutenant general
- Rubey Mosley Hulen (1894–1956), American judge

== See also ==
- Helen (given name)
