= Etilmon J. Stark =

American ragtime composer and arranger (1867–1962)

Etilmon "Til" Justus Stark (May 1867 – January 1, 1962) was an American ragtime composer and arranger, the eldest son of ragtime publisher John Stark. His best-known works include the pieces "Trombone Johnsen" (1902), "Billiken Rag" (1913), and "Gum Shoe" (1917), and the arrangements for the collection "Fifteen Standard High Class Rags" (1912), popularly known as "The Red Back Book".

== Biography ==
Stark was born in May 1867, in Gosport, Indiana, though his birth date is sometimes erroneously cited as 1868. Stark moved to Missouri with his family in his youth. In 1885, his father, who previously had been a farmer and ice cream store proprietor, took the family to Sedalia, Missouri, and opened a music store, John Stark and Son. John Stark later became a music publisher and made his fortune by publishing Scott Joplin's The Maple Leaf Rag. All of the Stark children, including sister Eleanor and brother William were talented musically, but Stark was the one who achieved greatest success. He died in Maplewood, Missouri, on January 1, 1962.

== Career ==
Stark became a music instructor, first at the Marmaduke Military Academy in Sweet Springs, Missouri. When Marmaduke burned in 1896, Stark moved to Wentworth Military Academy in Lexington, Missouri. Stark organized Wentworth's first band, and stayed as bandmaster from 1896 to 1905, composing The W.M.A. Cadets' March and some of his first rags, including Kyrene and Trombone Johnsen, during his tenure there. He later wrote several other notable ragtime piano compositions, all published by his father, including a few under the alias "Bud Manchester". He was also the arranger of a collection of ragtime pieces scored for band which became popularly known as the Red Back Book for its red cover.

== Compositions ==
- Bryan and Sewell - Free Silver (1896)
- The W.M.A. Cadets' March (1898)
- Trombone Johnsen (1902)
- Kyrene (1903)
- The Black Cat Rag (1905)
- Brainstorm Rag (as Bud Manchester) (1907)
- Twilight (1907)
- Clover Blossoms Rag (1912)
- Elaine (1913)
- Billiken Rag (1913)
- La Mode (1913)
- Valse Pensive (1913)
- Chicken Tango (1914)
- Gum Shoe Fox Trot (1917)
- We Are Coming, Uncle Sammy (1917)
- Clover Blossoms Rag (as Bud Manchester)

== See also ==
- List of ragtime composers
