= 141st Infantry Regiment (United States) =

- Coat of arms
- Active: 1880–present
- Country: United States
- Branch: United States Army
- Type: Infantry
- Nickname: First Texas (special designation)
- Motto: "Remember the Alamo"
- Engagements: World War II * Italian Campaign * France; War on terror

Insignia
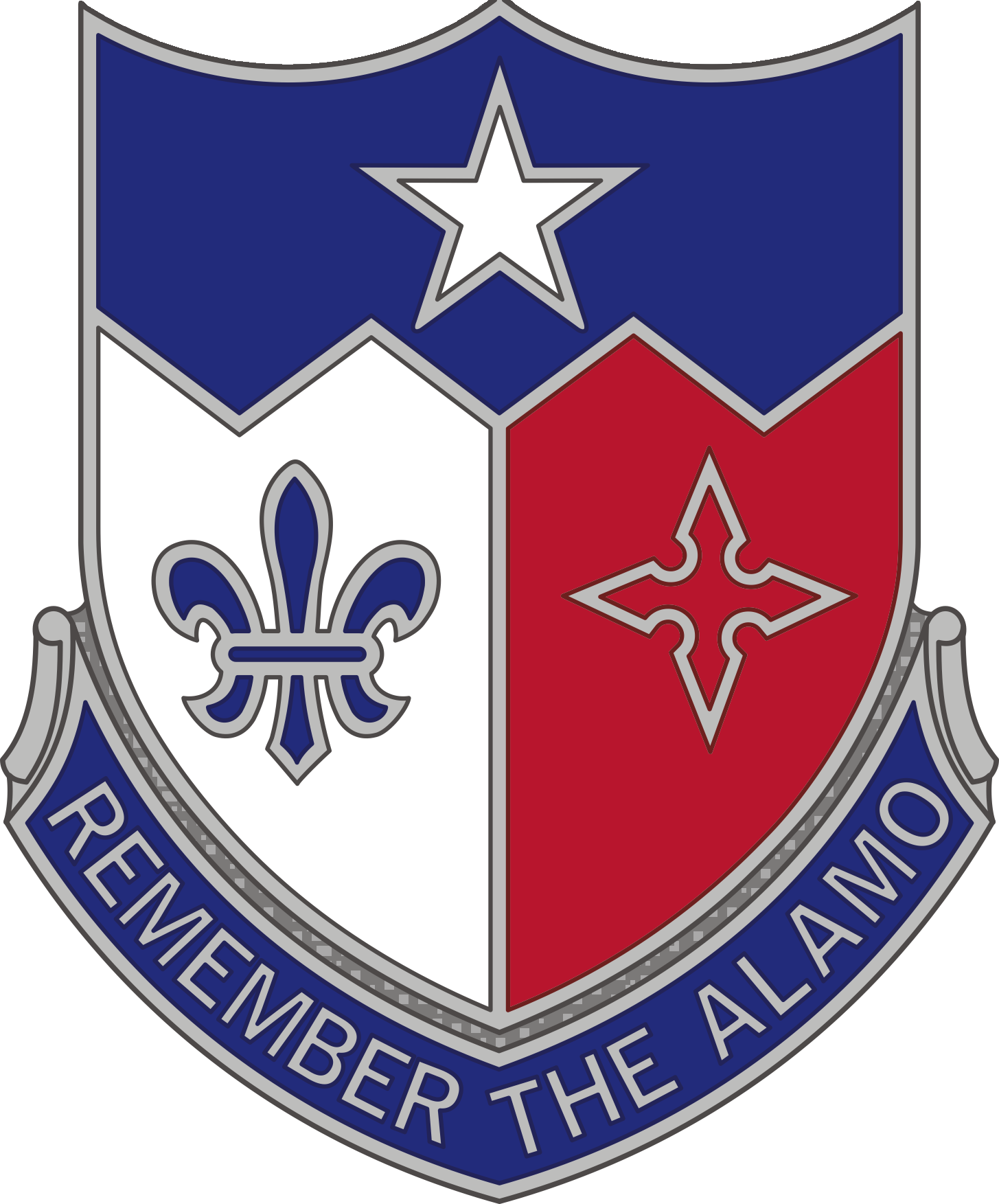
- Distinctive unit insignia

The 141st Infantry Regiment ("1st Texas Infantry") is an infantry regiment in the United States Army. The lineage of the 141st includes units tracing origins to the Texas Revolution, such as Company A, First Texas, 1836, and other infantry companies of the First Texas formed in the 1870s and 1880s.

== History ==
=== Interwar period ===
The 141st Infantry arrived at the port of New York on 3 June 1919 on the troopship USS Troy and was demobilized on 3 July 1919 at Camp Travis, near San Antonio, Texas. Pursuant to the National Defense Act of 1920, the 141st Infantry was reconstituted in the National Guard on 3 December 1920, assigned to the 36th Division, and allotted to Texas. The regiment was subsequently assigned to the 71st Infantry Brigade and allotted to the southwestern quadrant of Texas during reorganization. The regimental headquarters was reorganized and federally recognized on 24 June 1922 at Hillsboro, Texas. The headquarters was successively relocated as follows: to Brenham, Texas, 13 July 1928; Houston, Texas, 27 February 1933; San Antonio, 1 September 1933. The regiment was awarded the Pershing Trophy for marksmanship (Infantry) in 1937 and 1938. It conducted annual summer training most years at Camp Mabry, Austin, Texas, 1922–25, and Camp Hulen, Palacios, Texas, 1926–39. Inducted into active federal service at home stations on 25 November 1940 and moved to Camp Bowie, Texas, where it arrived on 27 December 1940.

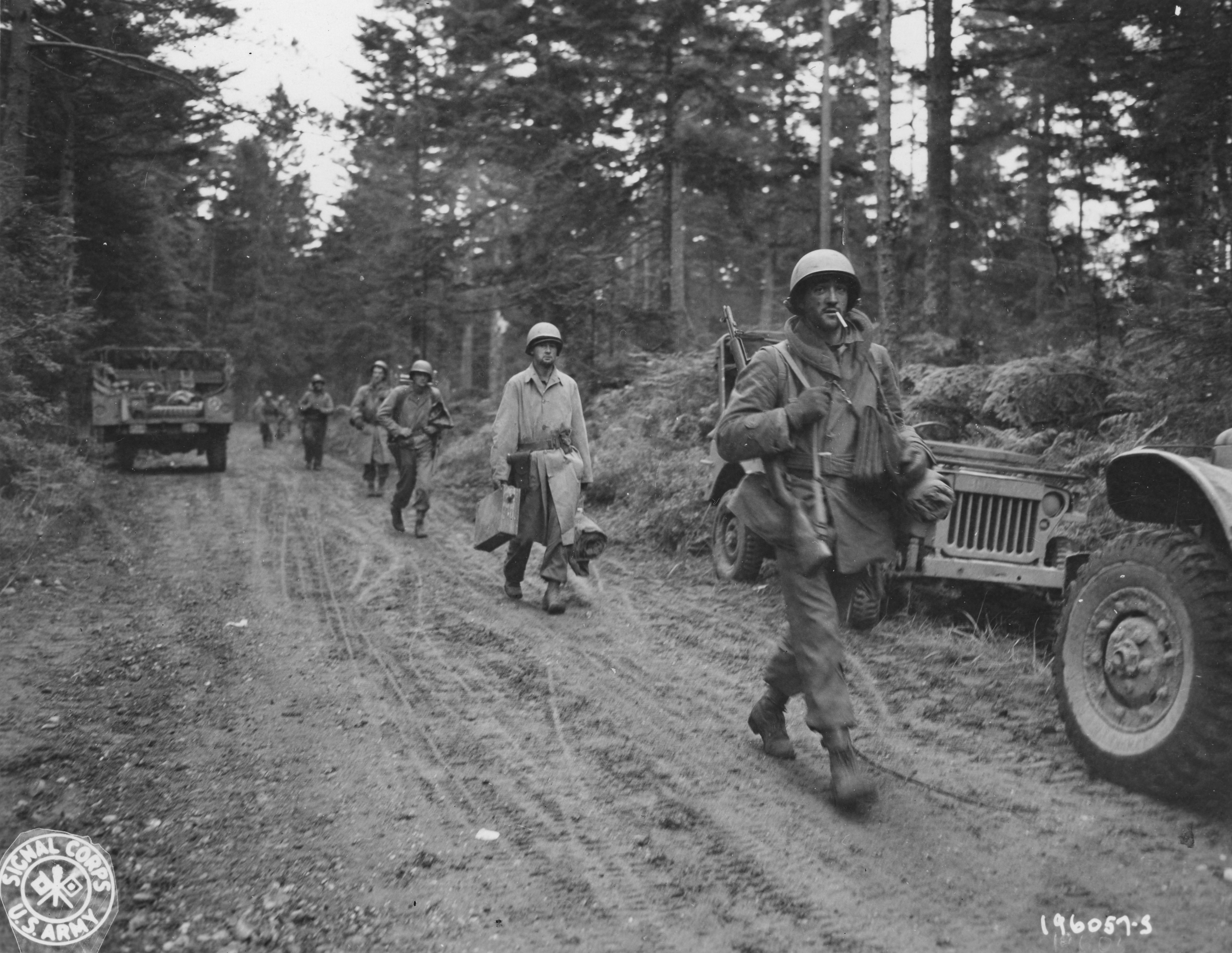
Soldiers of 1st Battalion, 141st Infantry Regiment in France. 1944

Armories of the regiment in 1940

=== World War II ===
On 24 October 1944, the 1st Battalion, 141st Infantry Regiment of the 36th Division was given the assignment to clear a ridge deep in the Vosges but was then cut off by the Germans. Flanking units had received an order to withdraw, but that order failed to reach the 1st Battalion. The other two battalions of the 141st were unable to break through. The 100th Battalion, 442nd Regimental Combat Team, composed primarily of Japanese-Americans, was ordered to relieve the Lost Battalion. More men were lost in the 442nd during the rescue operation than there were to save in the 1st Battalion of the 141st.

=== Postwar years ===
In 1973 the 49th Armored Division was reactivated, with the first and third battalions of the 141st Infantry (mechanized) assigned to the 1st Brigade. The 2/141 was mechanized and assigned to the 3d Brigade of the 49th Armored Division. By 1979, all three battalions of the 141st were assigned to the 1st Brigade, 49th Armored Division. In 1984, the 1/141 and 2/141 continued to be assigned to the 49th Armored, and 3d/141st was assigned to Texas National Guard Troop Command. In 1995, 2/141 was demobilized and the 3/141 was assigned to the 36th Brigade of the 49th Armored Division.

As part of the 2004 reorganization of the 49th Armored Division into the 36th Infantry Division the 141st Infantry is now part of the latter division as part of the 72nd Infantry Brigade Combat Team.

== Lineage ==
Constituted 18 February 1823 in the Mexican National Militia as the Texas Regiment

- Organized 22 June 1824 as the Austin Colony Battalion of Militia with headquarters at San Felipe de Austin to consist of the following companies:
- 1st Company, Captain Andrew Robinson
- 2d Company, Captain Horatio Chriesman
- 3d Company, Captain Randal Jones
- 4th Company, Captain Jesse Burnam
- 5th Company, Captain Amos Rawls.
- Reorganized and redesignated 23 June 1828 as the Austin Battalion, Coahuila y Texas Militia
- Reorganized and redesignated 5 October 1832 as the 2d Battalion, Militia of the Municipality Regiment
- Reorganized and redesignated 6 December 1836 as the Harrisburg County Regiment.

(Republic of Texas annexed to the United States 29 December 1845)

- Harrisburg County Regiment reorganized 21 April 1846 and assigned to the 2d Brigade, 3d Division, Texas Militia
- Mustered into Federal service 4–7 July 1846 at Galveston, Texas as Companies C and E, 1st Texas Foot Riflemen; mustered out of Federal service 24 August 1846 in Mexico
- Reorganized and redesignated 14 February 1860 as the 16th (Harris) Brigade, Texas State Troops
- The following companies of the 16th Brigade reorganized and mustered into state service February 1861-June 1862:
- San Jacinto Guards
- Confederate Guards
- Bayland Guards
- Confederate Greys
- Palmer Guards
- Bayou City Guards
- Turner Rifles
- Rough and Ready Company
- Houston Artillery
- Milam Rifles
- Harrisburg Guards.

While remaining in state service, the following units additionally organized for Confederate service:

- San Jacinto Guards, Confederate Guards, Bayland Guards and the Confederate Greys reorganized 23 February 1861 and mustered into Confederate service 31 July 1861 as Companies A, B, C and D, respectively, of the Galveston Infantry Regiment; Galveston Infantry Regiment mustered into Confederate service 31 July 1861 at Galveston
- Reorganized and redesignated September 1861 as the 1st Texas Infantry and assigned to the Department of Texas, Trans-Mississippi Department
- Redesignated 10 October 1861 as the 2d Texas Infantry Regiment; surrendered 4 July 1863 at Vicksburg, Paroled 11 July 1863; exchanged 12 September 1863
- Reorganized in Texas during the fall of 1863
- Disbanded 21 May 1865 at Galveston

Turner Rifles, Rough and Ready Company and the Houston Artillery mustered into Confederate service during the summer of 1861; concurrently, reorganized and redesignated as the 3d Texas Artillery Battalion, and assigned to the District of Texas,

- Trans-Mississippi Department; reorganized and redesignated 28 April 1862 as the 1st Texas Heavy Artillery; surrendered 26 May 1865 at Galveston
- Palmer Guards and the Bayou City Guards reorganized and redesignated 28 August-30 September 1861 at Camp Quantico and Rockets, Virginia as Company C, 1st Texas Infantry Regiment and Company A, 5th Texas Infantry Regiment, respectively;
- reorganized 22 October 1861 at Dumfries, Virginia and assigned to the 5th Brigade (Texas Brigade), Smith's Division, Army of Northern Virginia; 1st and 5th Texas Infantry Regiments, Texas Brigade, Army of Northern Virginia, paroled 9 April 1865 at Appomattox, Virginia
- Former elements of the 16th Brigade reorganized and redesignated in the Texas Militia 19 March 1873 as the following separate companies:
- Lone Star Rifles (Galveston)
- Island City Rifles (Galveston)
- Washington Guards (Galveston)
- Galveston Artillery Company (Galveston)
- Travis Rifles (Travis)
- Austin Greys (Travis)
- Austin City Rifles (Travis)
- Houston Light Guard (Harris)
- Texas Old Guard (Harris)
- Bayou City Guards (Harris)
- Alamo Rifles (Béxar)
- Lamar Rifles (Dallas)
- Stonewall Greys (Dallas)
- Comanche Guards (Comanche)
- Waco Greys (McLennan)
- Star Riflemen (Nueces)
- Smith County Guards (Smith)
- Fannin Light Guards (Fannin)
- Palestine Riflemen (Anderson)
- Kerrville Mounted Rifles (Kerr)
- Lavaca Greys (Calhoun)
- Gonzales Rifles (Gonzales)
- San Marcos Greys (Hays)

Reorganized and redesignated 24 June 1874 as a Regiment of Reserve Militia

- Reorganized in 1876 as the 1st Battalion, Texas Volunteers
- Reorganized and redesignated 6 April 1880 as the 2d Regiment of Infantry, Texas Volunteer Guard.

Elements reorganized and redesignated 10–12 May 1898 as the 1st Texas Volunteer Infantry and mustered into Federal service at Austin; mustered out of Federal service 18 April 1899 at Galveston

- Expanded, reorganized, and redesignated 1 July 1903 as the 1st and 2d Infantry Regiments (concurrently, Texas Volunteer Guard redesignated as the Texas National Guard)
- (1st Infantry Regiment reorganized 1 January 1908 as separate infantry companies [see ANNEX])
- 2d Infantry Regiment mustered into Federal service 18 May 1916; mustered out of Federal service 23 March 1917
- Called into Federal service 31 March 1917; mustered into Federal service 11–12 April 1917; drafted into Federal service 5 August 1917
- Consolidated 12 October 1917 with the 1st Infantry Regiment (see ANNEX); and consolidated unit designated as the 141st Infantry, an element of the 36th Division
- Demobilized 3 July 1919 at Camp Travis, Texas
- Reorganized in 1921 as the 141st Infantry, an element of the 36th Division; Headquarters Federally recognized 24 June 1922 at Hillsboro
- Location of headquarters changed 13 July 1928 to Brenham; on 27 February 1933 to Houston; on 1 September 1933 to San Antonio
- Inducted into Federal service 25 November 1940 at San Antonio.

(36th Division reorganized and redesignated 1 February 1942 as the 36th Infantry Division)

- Inactivated 22 December 1945 at Camp Patrick Henry, Virginia
- Reorganized and Federally recognized 23 October 1946 as the 141st Infantry, with headquarters at San Antonio
- Reorganized 16 March 1959 as a parent regiment under the Combat Arms Regimental System, to consist of the 1st Battle Group, an element of the 36th Infantry Division
- Reorganized 1 March 1963 to consist of the 1st and 2d Battalions, elements of the 36th Infantry Division
- Reorganized 1 November 1965 to consist of the 1st and 2d Battalions, elements of the 36th Infantry Brigade
- Reorganized 15 January 1968 to consist of the 1st, 2d, and 3d Battalions, elements of the 36th Infantry Brigade
- Reorganized 1 November 1973 to consist of the 1st, 2d, and 3d Battalions, elements of the 49th Armored Division.

Withdrawn 1 August 1987 from the Combat Arms Regimental System and reorganized under the United States Army Regimental System with headquarters at San Antonio

- (3d Battalion ordered into active Federal service 7 December 1990 at home stations; released from active Federal service 22 April 1991 and reverted to state control)
- Reorganized 1 September 1992 to consist of the 1st, 2d, and 3d Battalions, elements of the 49th Armored Division
- Reorganized 1 September 1994 to consist of the 1st and 3d Battalions, elements of the 49th Armored Division
- (1st Battalion ordered into active Federal service 6 October 2001 at home stations)
- Reorganized 1 May 2004 to consist of the 1st and 3d Battalions, elements of the 36th Infantry Division
- (3d Battalion ordered into active Federal service 7 March 2005; released from active Federal service 2 September 2006 and reverted to state control)
- (1st Battalion ordered into active Federal service 18 August 2005; released from active Federal service 13 February 2007 and reverted to state control)

=== Annex 1 ===
Former Companies B, D, and K, 1st Infantry Regiment, reorganized 1 January 1908 in the Texas National Guard from existing elements as a separate infantry battalion

- Reorganized and redesignated 9 November 1911 as Separate Companies B, D, and K
- Expanded and reorganized in June 1917 to form the 1st Infantry Regiment
- Drafted into Federal service 5 August 1917

== Distinctive unit insignia ==
=== Description ===
A silver color metal and enamel device 1 3/16 inches (3.02 cm) in height overall consisting of a shield blazoned: per pale argent and gules, a fleur-de-lis Azure and the badge of the 3d Brigade, 1st Division, 4th Army Corps, during the Spanish–American War, Proper fimbriated of the first on a chief dancetté of the third a mullet of the fifth. Attached above the shield on a wreath Argent and Gules, a mullet Argent encircled by a garland of live oak and olive Proper. Attached below and to the sides of the shield a Blue scroll inscribed "REMEMBER THE ALAMO" in silver letters.

=== Symbolism ===
The colors of the shield are white, red and blue and, with the mullet, allude to the flag of the Texas Republic, under which Company A, the oldest unit, was first organized. The badge on the sinister side of the shield represents the Cuban Occupation service of the 141st Infantry, Texas National Guard. The fleur-de-lis represents World War I service. The crest is that of the Texas Army National Guard.

The distinctive unit insignia was approved on 3 March 1931. It was amended to correct the wording in the blazon of the shield on 11 March 1931 and to add the crest of the Texas Army National Guard on 22 January 1969.

== Coat of arms ==
=== Blazon ===
- Shield: Per pale argent and gules, a fleur-de-lis azure and the badge of the 3d Brigade, 1st Division, 4th Army Corps, during the Spanish–American War, proper fimbriated of the first; on a chief dancetté of the third a mullet of the fifth.
- Crest: for the regiments and separate battalions of the Texas Army National Guard, on a wreath of the colors Argent and gules, a mullet Argent encircled by a garland of live oak and olive proper.
- Motto: REMEMBER THE ALAMO.

=== Symbolism ===
- Shield: colors of shield white, red and blue and, with the mullet, allude to the flag of the Texas Republic under which Company A, the oldest unit, was first organized. The badge on the sinister side of the shield represents the Cuban Occupation service of the 141st Infantry, Texas National Guard. The fleur-de-lis represents World War I service.
- Crest: that of the Texas Army National Guard.

=== Background ===
The coat of arms was approved on 5 March 1931 and was amended to correct the blazon of the shield on 11 March 1931.

== Campaign streamers ==
Texas Revolution

- Republic of Texas
- San Jacinto
- The Alamo

Mexican War

- Streamer without inscription

Civil War (Confederate Service)

- Shiloh
- Peninsula
- Second Manassas
- Sharpsburg
- Fredericksburg
- Gettysburg
- Vicksburg
- Chickamauga
- Chattanooga
- Wilderness
- Spotsylvania
- Cold Harbor
- Petersburg
- Appomattox
- Texas 1861
- Virginia 1861
- Mississippi 1862
- New Mexico 1862
- Texas 1862
- Virginia 1862
- Mississippi 1863
- Tennessee 1863
- Texas 1863
- Louisiana 1864
- Texas 1864
- Texas 1865

World War I

- Meuse-Argonne

World War II

- Naples-Foggia (with arrowhead)
- Anzio
- Rome-Arno
- Southern France (with arrowhead)
- Rhineland
- Ardennes-Alsace
- Central Europe

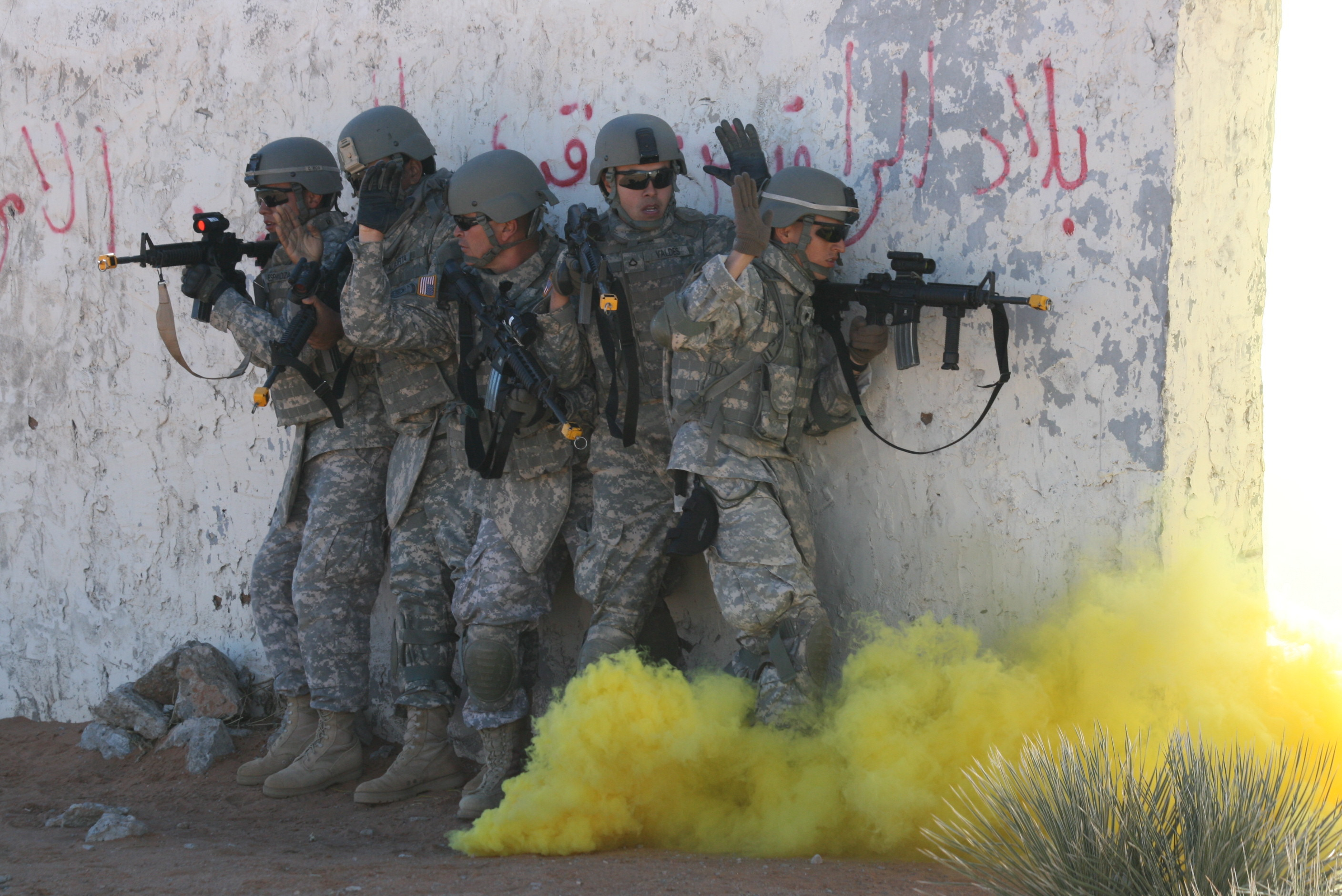
Guardsmen from the 3rd Battalion, 141st Infantry Regiment, 72nd Infantry Brigade Combat Team, during urban operations training at McGregor Range, New Mexico. 2009

War on Terrorism

- Campaigns to be determined

Company B (San Marcos), 1st Battalion, additionally entitled to:

- World War II
- India-Burm
- Central Burma

Headquarters Company (Weslaco), 3d Battalion, additionally entitled to:

- World War II
- New Guinea
- Bismarck Archipelago (with arrowhead)
- Leyte
- Luzon
- India-Burma
- Central Burma

== Decorations ==
- French Croix de Guerre with Palm, World War II, Streamer embroidered VOSGES

Headquarters Company (San Antonio), 1st Battalion, additionally entitled to:

- Meritorious Unit Commendation (Army), Streamer embroidered EUROPEAN THEATER

Company A (San Antonio), 1st Battalion, additionally entitled to:

- Presidential Unit Citation (Army), Streamer embroidered RIVIERA
