= 36th Infantry Division (United States) =

US Army National Guard formation

36th Division 36th Infantry Division
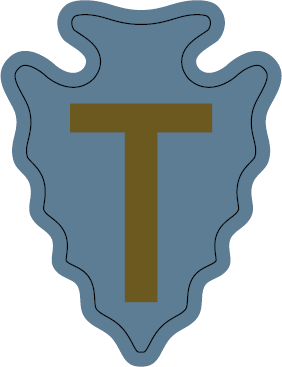
- 36th Infantry Division Shoulder Sleeve Insignia
- Active: 1917 – 1919; 1923 – 1945; 1946 – 1968; 2004 – present
- Country: United States
- Branch: United States Army National Guard
- Type: Infantry
- Size: Division
- Part of: Texas Army National Guard
- Garrison/HQ: Camp Mabry
- Nickname: "Arrowhead"
- Engagements: World War I; Meuse-Argonne; World War II; Dutch East Indies; Naples-Foggia; Rome-Arno; Southern France; Rhineland; Central Europe; War on Terror; Afghanistan War; Iraq War; Operation Inherent Resolve
- Decorations: French Croix de guerre with Palm

Commanders
- Current commander: MG John B. Bowlin
- Notable commanders: William Smith, Fred Walker, John Dahlquist, James K. "Red" Brown

Insignia
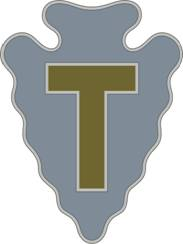
- Distinctive unit insignia

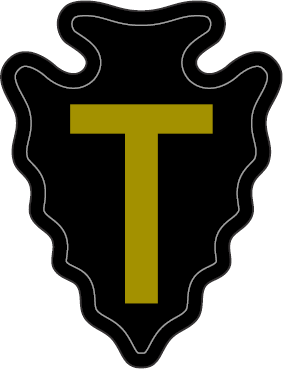
- Shoulder Sleeve Insignia—subdued version

- Combat Service Identification Badge

- Flag

The 36th Infantry Division ("Arrowhead") also known as the "Panther Division", the "Lone Star Division", "The Texas Army", and the "T-patchers", is an infantry division of the U.S. Army and part of the Texas Army National Guard. The 36th Infantry Division was first organized during World War I (1914–1918) from units of the Texas and Oklahoma National Guards. After the war, the division was reformed as an all-Texas unit, and was called to service for World War II (1937–1945) on 25 November 1940, was deployed to the European Theater of Operations in April 1943, and returned to the Texas National Guard in December 1945.

In late 1941, a unit of the 36th Infantry, the 2nd Battalion, 131st Field Artillery, was detached and deployed to the Pacific Theatre of Operations (PTO) against the Japanese forces. In the course of the fighting, the Japanese Imperial Army captured some soldiers from the 2/131 FA and enslaved them to perform forced labor. Their fate as a unit was unknown for most of World War II, which resulted in the 2/131 FA Bn. being nicknamed the "Lost Battalion" of the PTO.

After World War II, the division was reactivated in 1946, and continued in service until 1968 when it was reorganized as a brigade. In 2004, the 36th Infantry Division was reconstituted as part of the inactivation of the 49th Armored Division.

== History ==
=== World War I ===
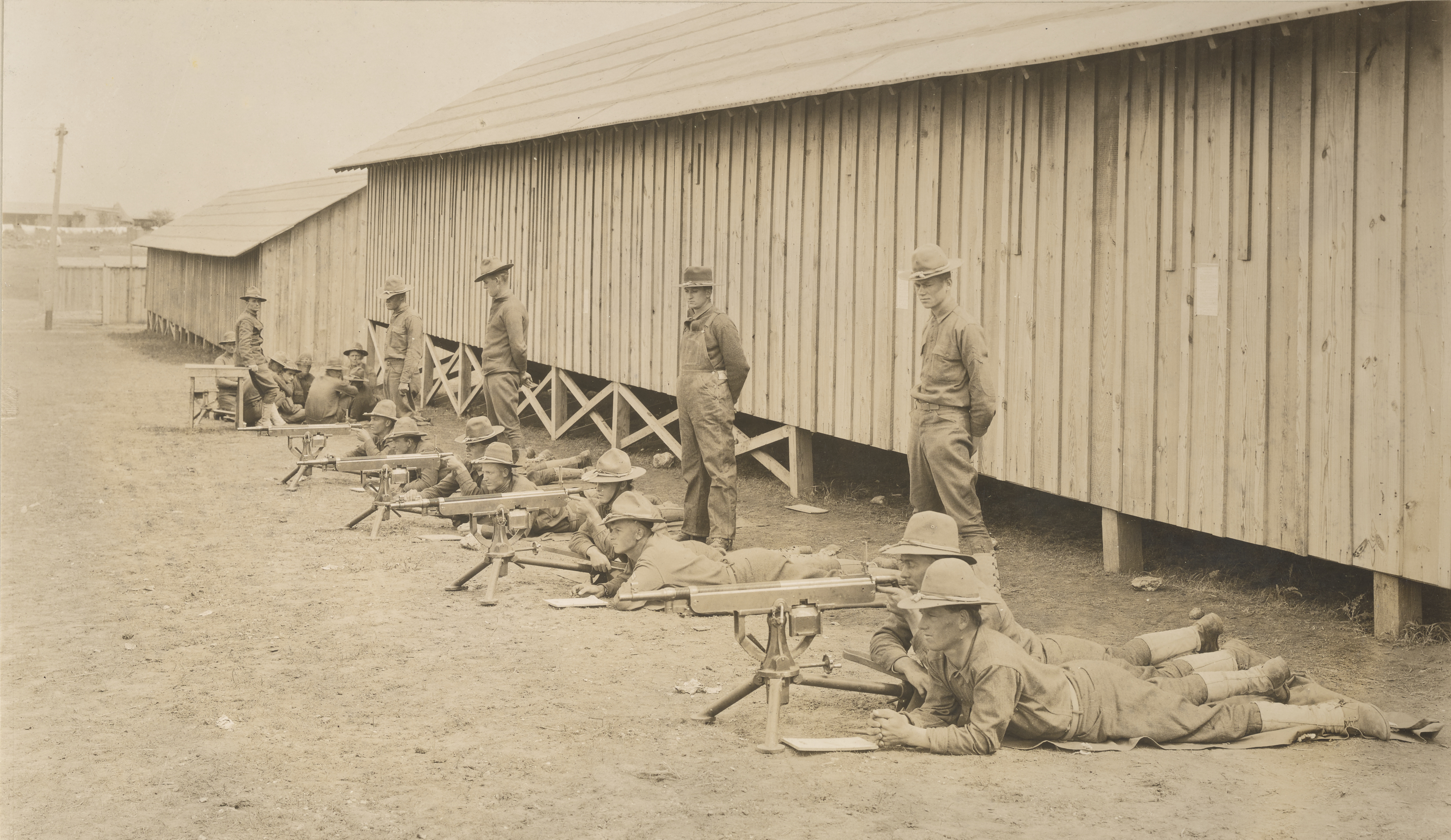
Doughboys of the 131st Machine Gun Battalion, 36th Division, during target practice at Camp Bowie, Fort Worth, Texas, 1918.

The 36th Division was originally constituted by the Militia Bureau in early 1917 as the 15th Division, made up of troops from Texas and Oklahoma. In July 1917, three months after the American entry into World War I, the designation was changed to the 36th Division when the War Department directed the organization of the unit at Camp Bowie, Texas, near Fort Worth, (related only in name to the later World War II-era camp near Brownwood, Texas) under the command of Major General Edwin St. John Greble.

After conducting training for the next few months, the 36th was sent to the Western Front in July 1918 and conducted major operations in the Meuse–Argonne offensive. On 9–10 October, the unit participated in heavy combat near the village of St. Etienne. Following this victory, which included the capture of several hundred men and officers of the German Army, as well as artillery, the unit launched an assault near an area known as "Forest Farm." The eventual victory brought World War I to an end. In the relatively brief period of time the 36th Division spent in action during the war, the division suffered 2,584 casualties, 466 of them killed in action and an additional 2,118 wounded or missing.

==== Order of battle ====
- Headquarters, 36th Division
- 71st Infantry Brigade
  - 141st Infantry Regiment (2nd Texas Infantry, and 1st Texas Infantry less Machine Gun Company and Band)
  - 142nd Infantry Regiment (7th Texas Infantry, and 1st Oklahoma Infantry less Machine Gun Company and Band)
  - 132nd Machine Gun Battalion (Machine Gun Company, 1st Texas Infantry)
- 72nd Infantry Brigade
  - 143rd Infantry Regiment (5th Texas Infantry, and 3rd Texas Infantry less Company D, Machine Gun Company, and Band)
  - 144th Infantry Regiment (6th Texas Infantry less Company G, and 4th Texas Infantry less Machine Gun Company and Band)
  - 133rd Machine Gun Battalion (Machine Gun Troop, 1st Texas Cavalry, Company D, 3rd Texas Infantry, and Company G, 6th Texas Infantry)
- 61st Field Artillery Brigade
  - 131st Field Artillery Regiment (75 mm) (2nd Texas Field Artillery)
  - 132nd Field Artillery Regiment (75 mm) (1st Texas Cavalry less Troops E and K, Machine Gun Troop, and Headquarters Troop)
  - 133rd Field Artillery Regiment (155 mm) (1st Texas Field Artillery)
  - 111th Trench Mortar Battery (Troop K and detachment of Troop E, 1st Texas Cavalry)
- 131st Machine Gun Battalion (Machine Gun Companies, 3rd and 4th Texas Infantry, and Machine Gun Company, 1st Oklahoma Infantry)
- 111th Engineer Regiment (1st Battalion, Texas Engineers, and 1st Battalion, Oklahoma Engineers)
- 111th Field Signal Battalion (1st Battalion, Texas Signal Corps)
- Headquarters Troop, 36th Division (Texas Division Headquarters Troop and Headquarters Troop, 1st Texas Cavalry)
- 111th Train Headquarters and Military Police (Texas Division Headquarters and Military Police)
  - 111th Ammunition Train (1st Separate Squadron, Oklahoma Cavalry, and individual transfers)
  - 111th Supply Train (Individual transfers)
  - 111th Engineer Train (Transfers from 111th Engineer Regiment)
  - 111th Sanitary Train (1st and 2nd Texas Ambulance Companies, 1st and 2nd Texas Field Hospitals, 1st Oklahoma Field Hospital)
    - 141st-144th Ambulance Companies and Field Hospitals

=== Interwar period ===
The 36th Division headquarters arrived at the port of New York aboard the USS Patricia on 4 June 1919 after 11 months of overseas service and was demobilized on 18 June 1919 at Camp Bowie. In accordance with the National Defense Act of 1920, the division was allotted to the state of Texas and assigned to the VIII Corps in 1921. In the reorganization of the division, the 71st Infantry Brigade was assigned to western Texas and the 72nd Infantry Brigade to eastern Texas; the 141st Infantry was organized in southwest Texas, the 142nd Infantry in northwest Texas, the 143rd Infantry in southeast Texas, and the 144th Infantry in northeast Texas.

The designated mobilization training center for the "Texas Division" was Camp Hulen on Matagorda Bay near Palacios, Texas, where much of the division's training activities occurred between the wars. The division headquarters was reorganized and federally recognized on 2 May 1923 at Houston, Texas. The division headquarters was relocated on 20 September 1930 to Fort Worth, and on 22 September 1936 to San Antonio, Texas. The division, less the 61st Field Artillery Brigade, conducted its summer camp at Camp Mabry, in Austin, Texas, from 1922 to 1923, Fort Crockett, Texas, on Galveston Bay, in 1924, back to Camp Mabry in 1925, and at Camp Hulen from 1926 to 1939. The 61st Field Artillery Brigade conducted its training every other year at Camp Bullis, near San Antonio, so that its subordinate batteries could conduct live-fire training at the artillery ranges located there. For at least three years (1931–33) the division's subordinate units trained over 170 company-grade Organized Reserve officers of the 90th Division at Camp Hulen and Camp Bullis.

Like the 26th, 27th, 28th, 33rd, 37th, and 38th Divisions, the 36th Division was located all in one state, and therefore could maximize opportunities to train as a complete unit. From 1922 to 1935, the 36th Division gradually increased its level of proficiency as its units became more skilled. The training was conducted at individual level initially, and up to regimental level for the later camps. In 1936, the division and brigade staffs participated in the Third Army command post exercise (CPX) at Camp Bullis. The CPX was designed to prepare the staffs for the large-scale maneuvers to be held in 1938. The division participated in the Eighth Corps Area concentration of the Third Army maneuvers at Camp Bullis in August 1938. During that maneuver, the 36th Division operated as part of the provisional Blue Corps against the 2nd and 45th Divisions of the Brown Corps. In January 1940, the 36th Division's commanding general and his staff participated in the 2nd Division's maneuver near Christine, Texas. For the final phase of the exercise, the division commander and staff assumed control of the simulated combat actions of the 2nd Division. In August 1940, the "Texas Division" again participated in the Third Army maneuvers, this time near the Kisatchie National Forest in Louisiana as part of the provisional VIII Corps.

=== World War II ===
==== WWII division organization ====
===== Square division =====
On 25 November 1940, the 36th Division, commanded by Major General Claude V. Birkhead, was inducted into federal service at home stations. On 14 December 1940, the division departed for its mobilization station Camp Bowie. At the time the division still retained its World War I square organization and consisted of the following units.

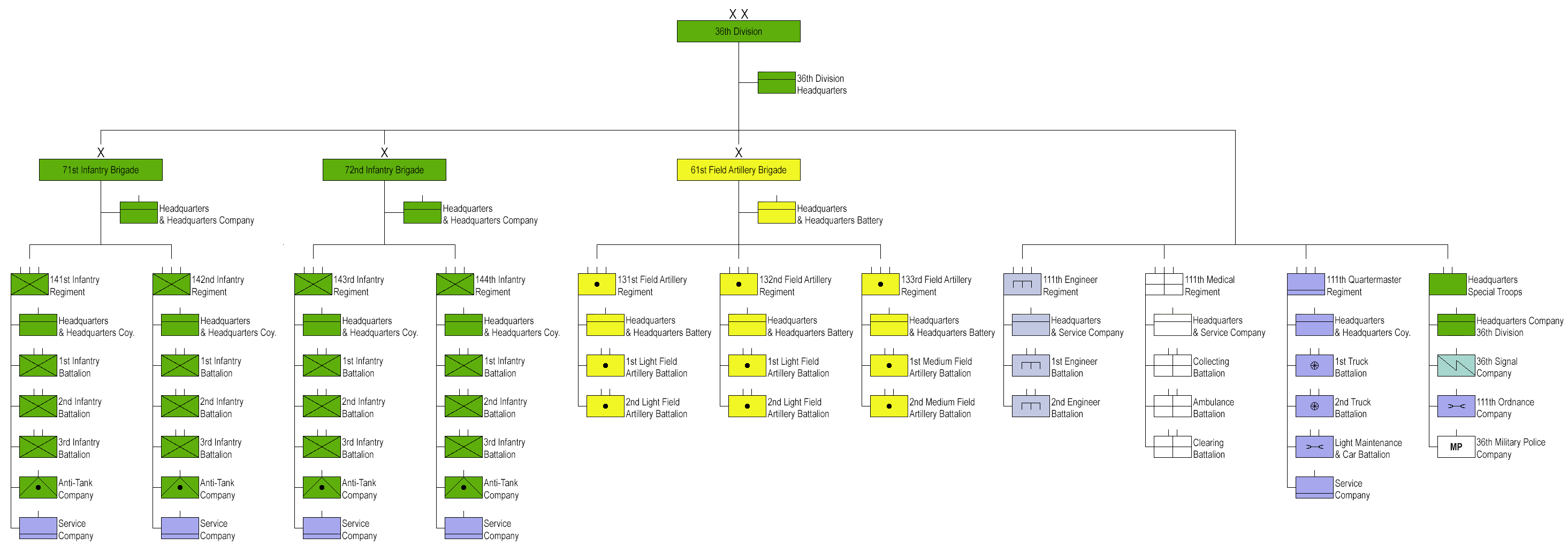
36th Division square organization (click to enlarge)

- 36th Division
  - 36th Division Headquarters
  - 71st Infantry Brigade
    - Headquarters and Headquarters Company
    - 141st Infantry Regiment
      - Headquarters and Headquarters Company
      - 3× Infantry battalions
        - each battalion consists of: 1× Headquarters and Headquarters Detachment, 3× Rifle companies, 1× Weapons Company
      - Anti-Tank Company (M3 37mm Anti-Tank guns)
      - Service Company
    - 142nd Infantry Regiment
      - same organization as 141st Infantry Regiment
  - 72nd Infantry Brigade
    - Headquarters and Headquarters Company
    - 143rd Infantry Regiment
      - same organization as 141st Infantry Regiment
    - 144th Infantry Regiment
      - same organization as 141st Infantry Regiment
  - 61st Field Artillery Brigade
    - Headquarters and Headquarters Battery
    - 131st Field Artillery Regiment
      - Headquarters and Headquarters Battery
      - 2× Light Field Artillery battalions
        - Headquarters and Headquarters Battery
        - 3× Howitzer batteries (M1897 75mm field guns), replaced by M2 105mm towed howitzers in 1941)
        - Service Battery
    - 132nd Field Artillery Regiment
      - same organization as 131st Field Artillery Regiment
    - 133rd Field Artillery Regiment
      - Headquarters and Headquarters Battery
      - 2× Medium Field Artillery battalions
        - Headquarters and Headquarters Battery
        - 3× Howitzer batteries (M1918 155mm towed howitzers, replaced by M1 155mm towed howitzers in 1941)
        - Anti-Tank Battery (M1897 75mm anti-tank guns)
        - Service Battery
  - 111th Engineer Regiment
    - Headquarters and Headquarters and Service Company
    - 2× Engineer battalions
      - each battalion consists of: 1× Headquarters, 3× Engineer companies
  - 111th Medical Regiment
    - Headquarters and Headquarters and Service Company
    - Collecting Battalion
      - battalion consists of: 1× Headquarters, 3× Collecting companies
    - Ambulance Battalion
      - battalion consists of: 1× Headquarters, 3× Ambulance companies
    - Clearing Battalion
      - battalion consists of: 1× Headquarters, 3× Clearing companies
  - 111th Quartermaster Regiment
    - Headquarters and Headquarters Company
    - 2× Truck battalions
      - each battalion consists of: 1× Headquarters, 2× Truck companies
    - Light Maintenance and Car Battalion
      - battalion consists of: 1× Headquarters, 1× Light Maintenance Company, 1× Car Company
    - Service Company
  - Headquarters, Special Troops
    - Headquarters Company, 36th Division
    - 36th Signal Company
    - 111th Ordnance Company
    - 36th Military Police Company

===== Triangular division =====
On 1 June 1941, the division moved to Brownwood in Texas, where it participated in the VIII Corps Brownwood Maneuvers until 13 June 1941. The division then moved to Mansfield in Louisiana, and took part in both the August and September 1941 Louisiana Maneuvers. The division, now commanded by Brigadier General Fred L. Walker, a Regular Army officer from Ohio and a distinguished veteran of World War I, then returned to Camp Bowie on 2 October 1941.

On 1 February 1942, as a part of an Army-wide reorganization of National Guard divisions, the 36th Division was reorganized as a triangular division. The division's two brigade headquarters were disbanded in favor of a structure containing three separate regimental commands reporting directly to the division headquarters, as well as four field artillery battalions under a division artillery headquarters, with the engineer, medical, and quartermaster regiments also reduced to battalions. The 144th Infantry Regiment was detached for non-divisional service in the continental United States and moved to San Francisco, California, on 20 April 1942, and to Santa Rosa, California, on 7 May 1942 under the Western Defense Command. With the reorganization the division was renamed 36th Infantry Division. Afterwards the 36th Infantry Division was composed of the following units:

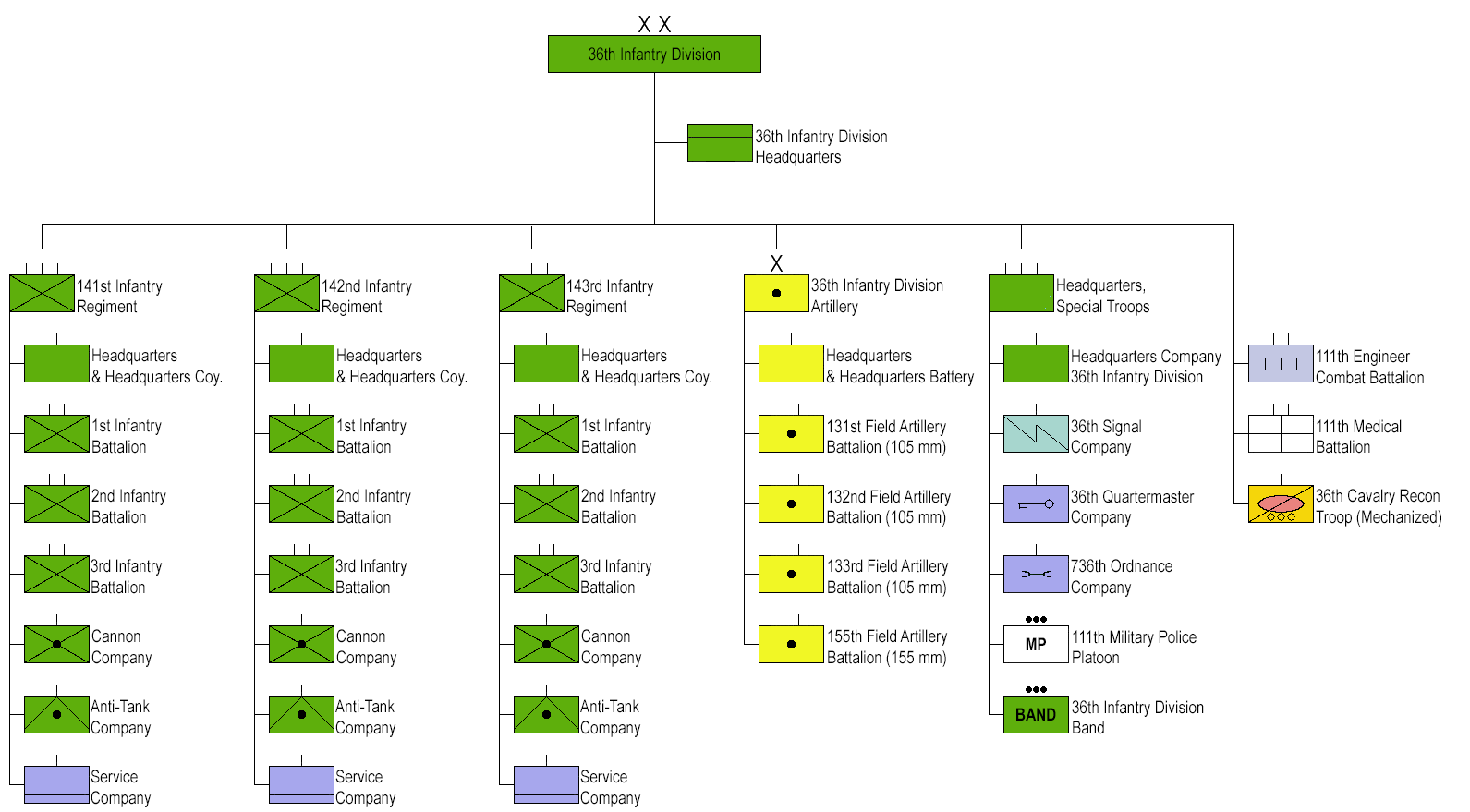
36th Infantry Division triangular organization (click to enlarge)

- 36th Infantry Division
  - 36th Infantry Division Headquarters
  - 36th Cavalry Reconnaissance Troop (Mechanized) (M3 scout cars and then M8 Greyhound armored cars)
  - 141st Infantry Regiment
    - Headquarters and Headquarters Company
    - 3× Infantry battalions
      - each battalion consists of: 1× Headquarters and Headquarters Company, 3× Rifle companies, 1× Heavy Weapons Company
    - Cannon Company (T12 Gun Motor Carriages and T19 Howitzer Motor Carriages, later replaced by either M3 105mm towed howitzers or M7 Priest self propelled howitzers)
    - Anti-Tank Company (M3 37mm anti-tank guns, which were replaced by 1944 with M1 57mm anti-tank guns)
    - Service Company
  - 142nd Infantry Regiment
    - same organization as 141st Infantry Regiment
  - 143rd Infantry Regiment
    - same organization as 141st Infantry Regiment
  - 36th Infantry Division Artillery
    - Headquarters and Headquarters Battery
    - 131st Field Artillery Battalion
      - Headquarters and Headquarters Battery
      - 3× Batteries (M2 105mm towed howitzers)
      - Service Battery
    - 132nd Field Artillery Battalion
      - same organization as 131st Field Artillery Battalion
    - 133rd Field Artillery Battalion
      - same organization as 131st Field Artillery Battalion
    - 155th Field Artillery Battalion
      - Headquarters and Headquarters Battery
      - 3× Batteries (M1 155mm towed howitzers)
      - Service Battery
  - Headquarters Special Troops
    - Headquarters Company, 36th Infantry Division
    - 36th Signal Company
    - 36th Quartermaster Company
    - 736th Ordnance Light Maintenance Company
    - 111th Military Police Platoon
    - 36th Infantry Division Band (attached)
  - 36th Quartermaster Battalion (Between September and November 1942 Quartermaster battalions were disbanded and their platoons used to form a Quartermaster Company and an Ordnance Company, which were both assigned to Headquarters Special Troops)
    - Headquarters and Headquarters Company (includes a service platoon and a maintenance platoon)
    - Truck Company
  - 111th Engineer Combat Battalion
    - Headquarters and Headquarters and Service Company
    - 3× Engineer combat companies
  - 111th Medical Battalion
    - Headquarters and Headquarters Detachment
    - 3× Collecting companies
    - Clearing Company

The division then moved to Camp Blanding, Florida, on 19 February 1942, and participated in the Carolina Maneuvers between 9 July 1942, and 15 August 1942. The division then was staged at Camp Edwards, Massachusetts, on 17 August 1942, for its port call to the European Theater Of Operations (ETO). During its time at Camp Edwards, the division conducted mock assaults of Martha's Vineyard Island in preparation for future amphibious operations. The division departed the New York Port of Embarkation (NYPOE) on 2 April 1943, for service in the Mediterranean Theater of Operations (MTO). At the time, approximately eighty percent of the personnel in the division were from Texas.

==== Combat chronicle ====
===== North Africa and Italy 1943−1944 =====
The 36th Division landed in French North Africa on 13 April 1943, and trained at Arzew and Rabat. However, the training was hampered by the need to supply guards for some 25,000 Axis prisoners of war (POWs) who had surrendered at the conclusion of the Tunisian campaign in May. It was assigned to Major General Ernest J. Dawley's VI Corps, part of the Fifth Army, but attached to the Services of Supply, North African Theater of Operations, United States Army (NATOUSA), for supply. The 36th Division was originally intended to take part in the Allied invasion of Sicily, codenamed Operation Husky, but Lieutenant General George S. Patton the Seventh Army commander, preferred to use experienced troops instead and the 36th Division remained in North Africa. The Fifth Army was commanded by Lieutenant General Mark W. Clark, who knew the 36th Division well from his time as chief of staff to Lieutenant General Lesley J. McNair, commander of Army Ground Forces, and specifically chose the 36th Division, rather than the more experienced 34th Infantry Division, together with the British 46th and 56th Infantry Divisions, to spearhead the Allied assault landings at Salerno, Italy, which was given the codename of Operation Avalanche.

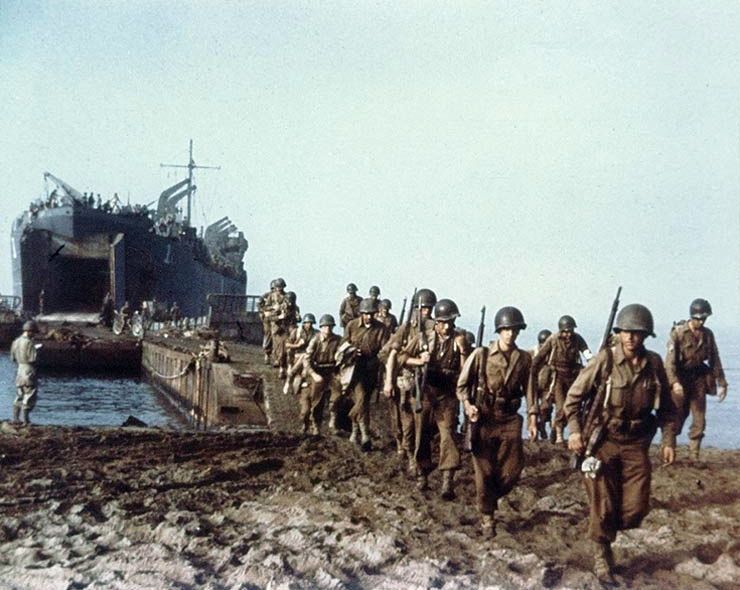
A U.S. Navy Landing Ship, Tank (LST-1) landing American Army troops possibly from the 36th Division on an Italian beach, via a causeway

Having missed out on the fighting in Sicily, the division first saw action in the Italian campaign, landing at Salerno on 9 September 1943. It was the first U.S. combat unit to fight on the European continent when it landed by sea at Paestum and fought in the Battle of Salerno against intense German opposition. The Germans launched numerous fierce counterattacks on 12–14 September, but the 36th, which at one stage during the battle was holding a 35-mile sector of the front (six times more than a full-strength infantry division was able to hold), repulsed them with the aid of air support and naval gunfire, and, with the help of paratroopers of the 504th Parachute Infantry Regiment (part of the 82nd Airborne Division), advanced slowly, securing the area from Agropoli to Altavilla. After sustaining over 4,000 casualties in its first major action, the division spent the next few weeks behind the lines, where it remained in the Fifth Army reserve, absorbing replacements and training for future combat operations. Despite the heavy losses, the 36th Division was considered to have fought well, and four men were awarded the Medal of Honor.

The 36th Division returned to combat in mid-November, after six weeks of rest, now under Major General Geoffrey Keyes' II Corps command. It captured Mount Maggiore, Mount Lungo, and the village of San Pietro despite strong enemy positions and severe winter weather. This grueling campaign against the Bernhardt Line was marked by futile attempts to establish a secure bridgehead across the Gari River, erroneously identified as the Rapido on 1 January 1944, to 8 February. The division attacked across the Gari River on 20 January but was harshly repulsed by the 15th Panzergrenadier Division. The 141st and 143rd Infantry Regiments were virtually destroyed, and the attack was stopped on 22 January. In 48 hours, the 36th Division had sustained 1,681 casualties, 143 of them killed, 663 wounded, and 875 missing, out of almost 6,000 men who took part. Many of the casualties consisted of newly arrived replacements who were poorly integrated into their units. German losses were minimal, with only 64 killed and a further 179 wounded. A company commander in the 143rd Infantry said, "I had 184 men. Forty-eight hours later, I had 17. If that's not mass murder, I don't know what is." 36th Division losses until the end of January 1944 were 2,255 battle casualties and 2,009 non-battle casualties, with the combat effectiveness of the 141st and 143rd Infantry Regiments severely diminished.

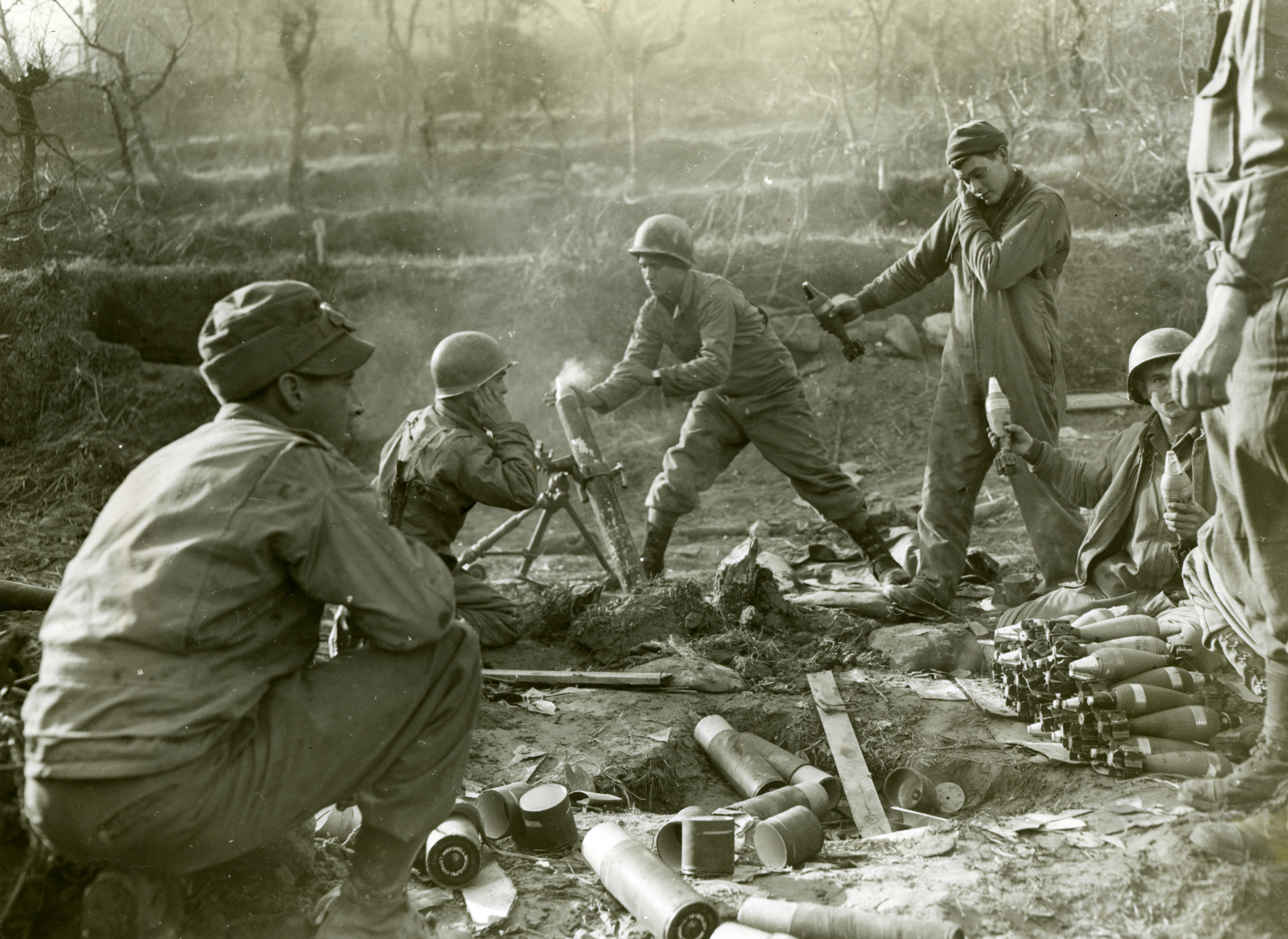
G.I.'s of the 141st Infantry, 36th Infantry Division, firing an 81-mm. mortar in support of the Rapido river crossing, January 1944.

Strong controversy flared among the officers of the division. Lieutenant General Clark, the Fifth Army commander, was severely criticized for having ordered a difficult frontal attack, and was accused of having caused the disaster. After the war Congress, urged on by veterans of the division, conducted an investigation into the causes and responsibility for the defeat on the Gari River. Clark was absolved of blame and he personally believed the attack to be necessary, in order to attract German reserves from northern Italy to prevent their use at Anzio, where an amphibious assault, codenamed Operation Shingle, was being launched by Anglo-American forces in an attempt to outflank the Winter Line, capture the Italian capital of Rome, and potentially force a German withdrawal away from their formidable Winter Line defenses. However, the German reserves identified in northern Italy had already been drawn forward onto the front of the British X Corps during the First Battle of Monte Cassino a few days before, thus making the 36th Division's assault unnecessary, although this was unknown to Clark at the time.

After assisting the 34th Infantry Division in the attack on Cassino and fighting defensively along the Gari River, the severely depleted 36th withdrew from the line on 12 March, for rest and recreation. The division arrived by sea at the Anzio beachhead on 22 May, under the command of Major General Lucian Truscott's VI Corps, to take part in Operation Diadem, with the breakout from the beachhead commencing the following day. It drove north to capture Velletri on 1 June, and entered Rome on 5 June 1944, the day before the Normandy landings. Pushing up from Rome, the 36th encountered sharp resistance at Magliano, but reached Piombino on 26 June, before moving back to Paestum for rest and recreation. In July Major General Walker, who had commanded the 36th Division since September 1941, was replaced by Major General John E. Dahlquist.

===== Western Europe 1944−1945 =====
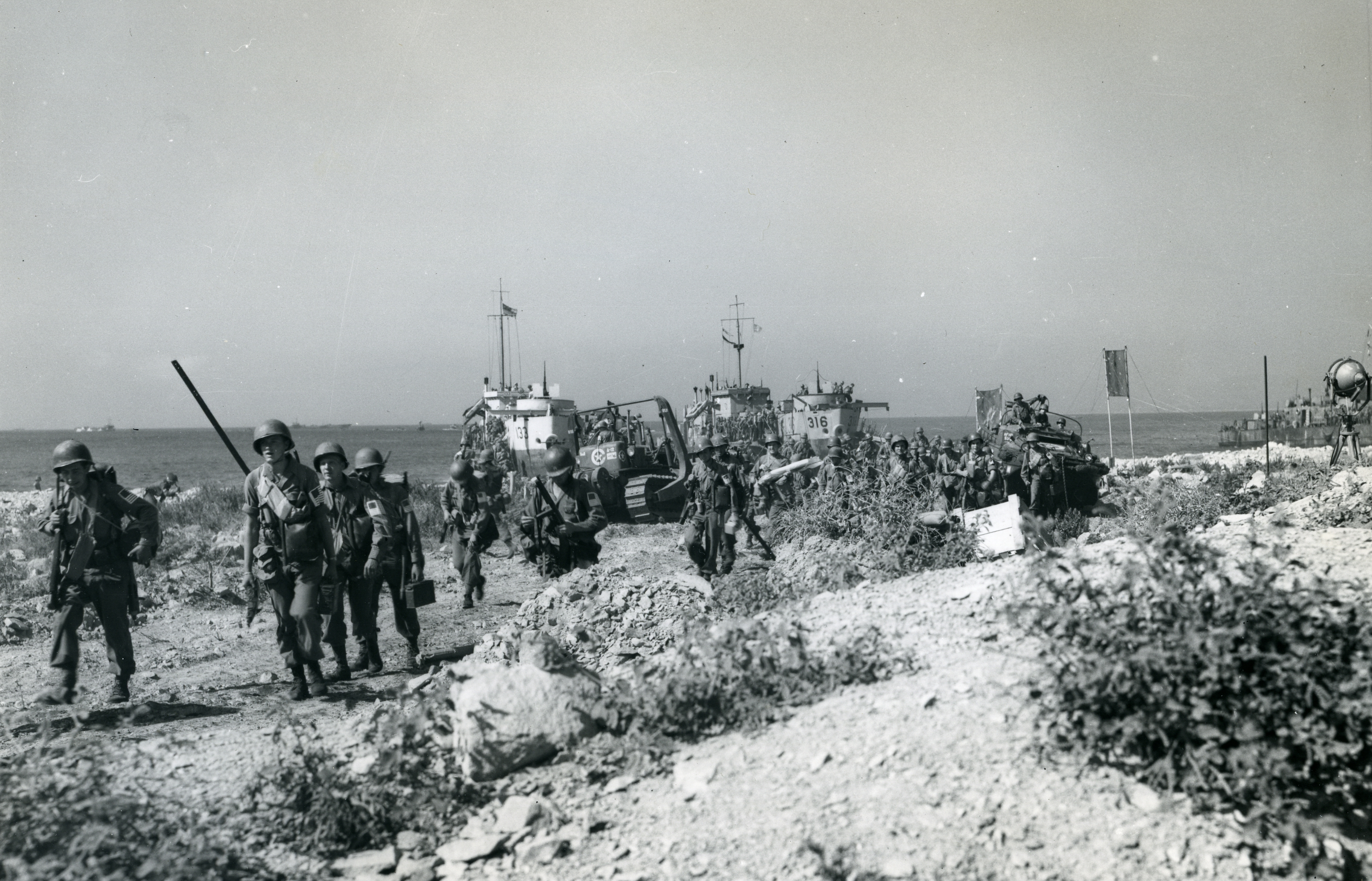
Elements of the 36th Division come ashore on D-Day, during the invasion of southern France, 15 August 1944.

On 15 August 1944, as part of the U.S. 6th Army Group, the division made another amphibious assault landing, against light opposition in the Saint-Raphaël-Fréjus area of southern France as part of Operation Dragoon, the Allied invasion of Southern France. A rapid advance opened the Rhone River Valley. Montelimar fell, 28 August, and large German units were trapped. The division reached Lyon on 3 September and Bourg-en-Bresse the 4th.On 15 September, the division was attached to the French First Army. The 36th advanced to the Moselle River at Remiremont and the foothills of the Vosges. On 30 September, the 442nd Regimental Combat Team (442nd RCT, a Japanese-American unit) was assigned to the 36th to help shore up the division. The 442nd was subsequently used to spearhead the capture towns of Bruyères and Biffontaine where they faced stiff opposition. On 24 October the 143rd Infantry relieved the 100th and 3rd Battalion who were sent to Belmont, another small town to the north, for some short-lived rest. On 23 October the 1st Battalion, 141st Infantry were cut off just beyond the town or Biffontaine. On 27 October the 442nd RCT was called back in to save this Lost Battalion. On the afternoon of 30 October 3rd Battalion broke through and reached 1st Battalion, 141st, rescuing 211 T-Patchers at the cost of 800 men in five days. However, the fighting continued for the 442nd as they moved past the 141st Infantry. The drive continued until they reached Saint-Die on 17 November when they were finally pulled back. The 100th fielded 1,432 men shortly before, but was now down to 239 infantrymen and 21 officers. The 2nd Battalion was down to 316 riflemen and 17 officers, while not a single company in the 3rd Battalion had over 100 riflemen; the entire 100th/442nd Regimental Combat Team was down to less than 800 soldiers. On 13 October 1944, when attached to the 36th Infantry Division, the unit was at 2,943 rifleman and officers, but in only three weeks 140 were killed and 1,800 were wounded, while 43 were missing. For this action, the 442nd RCT would earn 3 of its 7 Presidential Unit Citations.

In a grinding offensive, the division crossed the Meurthe River, breached the Ste. Marie Pass and burst into the Alsatian Plains. The enemy counterattacked, 13 December 1944, but the 36th held the perimeter of the Colmar Pocket. Two days later, the division was released from attachment to the French First Army, and returned to the control of VI Corps, now under Major General Edward H. Brooks, under the Seventh Army, commanded by Lieutenant General Alexander Patch. The German counterattacks out of the Colmar Pocket were so fierce, that at times, the field artillery was forced to fire over open sights at point blank range to stop them. On 20 December 1944, the division resumed the attack, advancing northward along the Rhine River to Mannheim meeting heavy resistance at Haguenau, Oberhöfen, and Wissembourg. In this action Company "G" of the 143rd Infantry received a Presidential Unit Citation. On 27 December 1944, the division was reassigned to Major General Frank W. Milburn's XXI Corps of the Seventh Army, and was pinched out and returned to Seventh Army reserve on 30 December 1944. During these battles in France the division had the highest rate of desertion out of any division in the American Army.

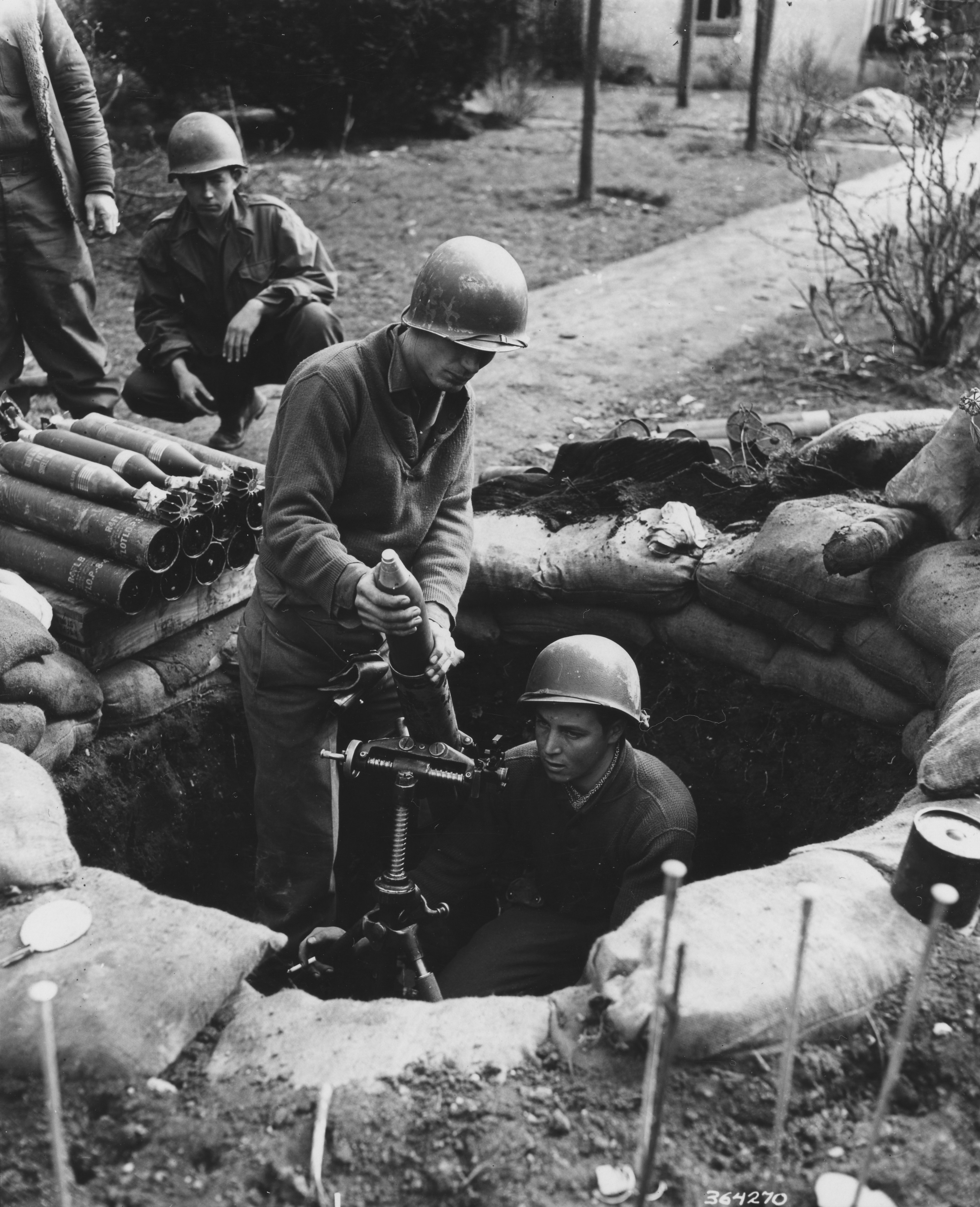
Men of "D" Company, 141st Infantry, 36th Division, firing an 81mm mortar while in Haguenau Area, France, March 1945.

The division was taken out of the line for the first time since it had landed in the south of France. On 3 January 1945, the division was reassigned to Major General Wade H. Haislip's XV Corps. In January 1945, the division was reassigned to VI Corps. It returned to the line early March. The 36th was reassigned to the Seventh Army on 29 March 1945, and moved to the Danube River on 22 April 1945. The 36th Division has been recognized as a liberating unit for its work securing the subcamps of the Dachau concentration camp system.

The 36th Division was reassigned to the XXI Corps on 27 April 1945, and attacked the Künzelsau area on the 30th. Members of the 36th Division's 142nd Infantry arriving as reinforcements on 5 May tipped the Battle for Castle Itter in favor of a combined U.S. Army/Wehrmacht defense against a Waffen SS attack, the only time German and American forces fought side by side in World War II.

The 36th Division was responsible for the capture of Reichsmarschall Hermann Göring, Former Commander in Chief of Luftwaffe who handed himself to the Division on 6 May 1945.

By 8 May 1945, otherwise known as Victory in Europe Day (VE-Day), the 36th Division was based in Kitzbühel, Austria where it captured Generalfeldmarschall- Gerd von Rundstedt, the commander of all German Armed Forces on the Western Front, and its final station was at Kufstein, Austria on 14 August 1945.

After 400 days of combat, the 36th Infantry Division returned to the United States in December 1945. It was returned to the Texas Army National Guard on 15 December 1945.

===== The Lost Battalions =====
The 36th ID suffered significant losses during World War II, twice earning the distinction of having "lost" a battalion during the war.

The "Lost Battalion" refers to the 1st Battalion, 141st Infantry, which was surrounded by German forces in the Vosges Mountains on 24 October 1944.

They would be rescued by the 442nd Regimental Combat Team, a segregated unit composed of second-generation Japanese Americans. In five days of battle, over 800 men of the 442nd gave their lives in order to break through German defenses and rescue 211 survivors of the 141st.

Texas Governor John Connally would make the members of the 442nd honorary Texans in appreciation of their rescue of the 141st Infantry in 1962.

Earmarked as part of the reinforcements to U.S. Army troops in the Philippines, the 2nd Battalion, 131st Field Artillery, was detached from the 36th Infantry and departed Hawaii in November 1941 for the Philippines as part of the Pensacola Convoy. After the Japanese attacks on 7–8 December 1941, the battalion eventually fought in the Battle of Java, fiercely at Porong with several other Allied units until it was captured by the Japanese in March 1942. Information on the unit's fate was unknown and considered "lost" as details following the Dutch surrender in Java failed to reach the U.S. government.

As prisoners, the men were forced to work in Burma and Thailand on the Burma Railway of The Bridge on the River Kwai fame, as well as coal mines, docks and shipyards in Japan and other southeast Asian countries. Conditions were poor, treatment harsh, and mortality exceptionally high. It was only through debriefing of survivors from Japanese POW convoys who had been sunk and rescued by U.S. submarines in September 1944 that the U.S. government would learn of the unit's fate.

Repatriated after the end of the war in August 1945, the surviving POWs of the lost battalion were scattered throughout Southeast Asia in Java, Singapore, Burma, Thailand, French Indo China, Japan, China and Manchuria.

==== Attached units in ETO ====
- 191st Tank Battalion (26 August 1944 – 31 August 1944)
- 753rd Tank Battalion (15 August 1944 – 26 December 1944); (4 March 1945 – 29 March 1945); (29 April 1945 – 13 June 1945)
- 636th Tank Destroyer Battalion (15 August 1944 – 29 March 1945; 29 April 1945 – 13 June 1945)
- 822nd Tank Destroyer Battalion (29 April 1945 – 1 May 1945)
- 443rd Anti Aircraft Artillery Battalion (AW)(31 October 1943 – 1 July 1945)
- 442nd Regimental Combat Team (11 September 1944 – 13 October 1944)

==== Unit awards ====
- Presidential Unit Citation: 12.

==== Personal awards ====
- Medal of Honor: 14
- Distinguished Service Crosses: 80
- Distinguished Service Medals: 2
- Silver Stars: 2,354
- Legion of Merit Medals: 49
- Soldier's Medals: 77
- Bronze Star Medals: 5,407
- Air Medals: 88

==== Casualties ====
- Total battle casualties: 19,466
- Killed in action: 3,131
- Wounded in action: 13,191
- Missing in action: 494
- Prisoner of war: 2,650

=== Cold War ===
The 36th Infantry Division headquarters was reorganized and federally recognized on 10 December 1946 at Austin, Texas. As part of Secretary McNamara's reduction of National Guard combat divisions in the 1960s, the 36th Infantry Division was inactivated on 15 January 1968 and reorganized as Headquarters, 71st Airborne Brigade.

The 71st Airborne Brigade was active from 15 December 1967 until 1 November 1973.

The 71st Airborne Brigade consisted of three airborne infantry battalions and an airborne field artillery unit.

- 1st Battalion (Airborne), 143d Infantry
- 2nd Battalion (Airborne), 143d Infantry
- 3rd Battalion (Airborne), 143d Infantry
- 1st Battalion (Airborne), 133d Field Artillery (Port Arthur, Texas)

Both the 71st and its successor, the 36th Airborne Brigade, were intended to reinforce the 82nd Airborne Division as its fourth brigade. All 3,300 troopers of the 71st Brigade were authorized to be jump-qualified. On 1 November 1973, the brigade was inactivated and a reduced number of its personnel and amount of equipment were used to activate the 36th Airborne Brigade, a TDA headquarters. The brigade only had two battalions: 1-143d and 2-143d. On 1 April 1980 the brigade was inactivated and the two battalions were reorganized and redesignated, no longer being infantry.

The personnel of the headquarters company, 36th Airborne Brigade, were used to form part of the 386th Engineer Battalion. On 1 June 1988, the brigade was reconstituted and redesignated as the 36th Brigade, 50th Armored Division, with the headquarters company of the 386th forming the headquarters company of the brigade. On 1 September 1992, the brigade was reassigned to the entirely Texas-based 49th Armored Division.

=== Twenty-first Century ===
On 1 May 2004, the 49th Armored Division was inactivated and redesignated as the 36th Infantry Division.

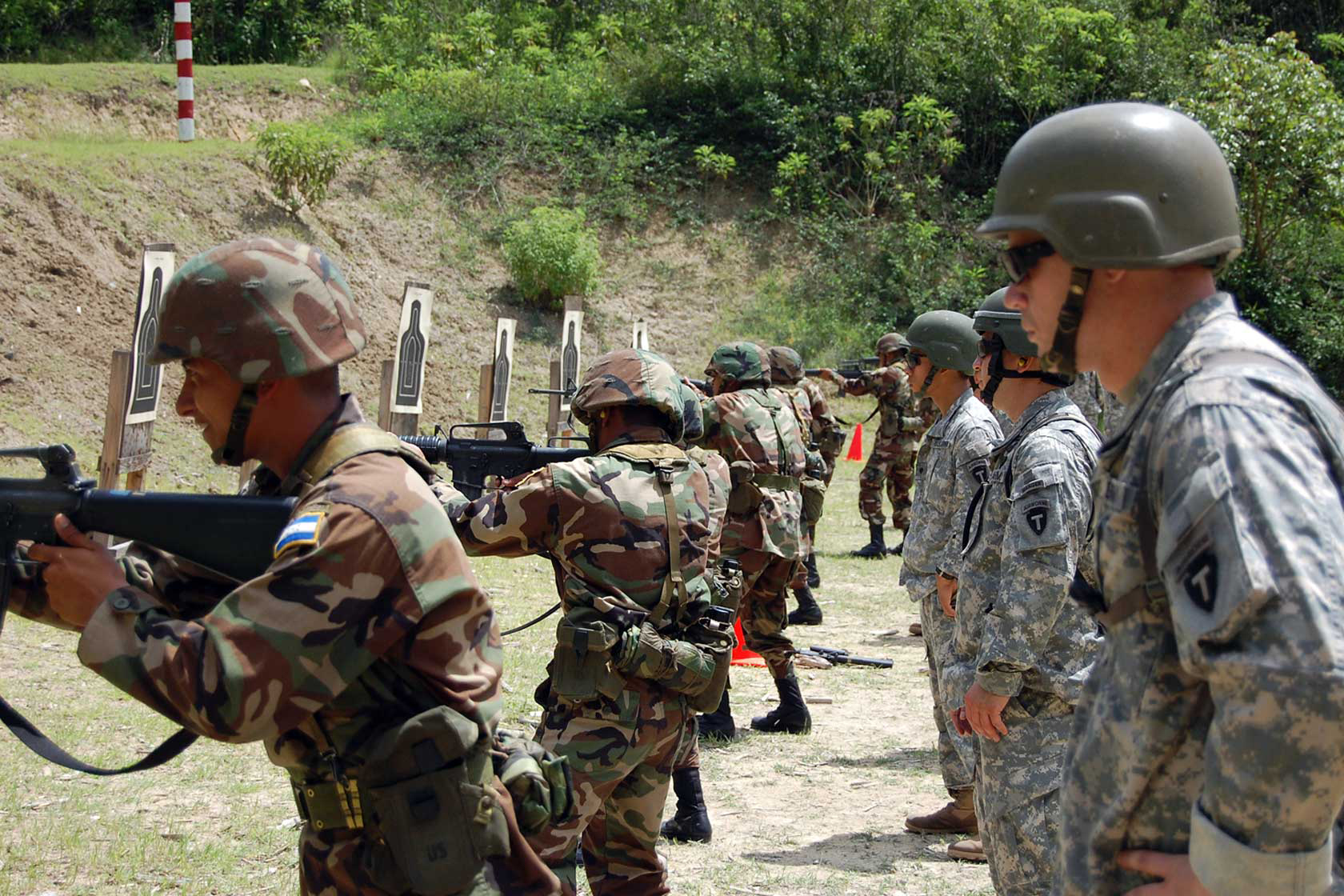
36th Infantry Division soldiers instruct Honduran soldiers.

In January 2004, 74 soldiers from Alpha Battery, 2nd Battalion, 131st Field Artillery were activated for federal service to fight in the Iraq War. Alpha Battery, commanded by Captain Alvaro Gomez, entered federal service at Fort Sill, Oklahoma. Under the supervision of 1st Sergeant Alfredo Barrera, the soldiers trained and deployed to Iraq. While readying their equipment in Kuwait, Alpha Battery was given her mission and the five radar sections were split up. One AN-TPQ37 radar section (under Staff Sergeant Gonzales) was attached to the 1st Marine Division at Al-Taqaddum Air Base, while another (CW4 Earnest Metcalf) was assigned to the 1st Infantry Division at LSA Anaconda and the three AN-TPQ36 radar sections (CW2 Davidson, CW2 Bien, and SSG Johnson) were assigned to the 2nd Infantry Division in Mosul.

The headquarters and support platoon (1LT Christopher Galvan) operated out of Forward Operating Base Freedom in northern Mosul. In addition to the target acquisition mission, the support platoon supplemented patrols conducted by the 25th Infantry Division Fires Brigade FIST Team and provided security for the FOB's perimeter by manning the entrance gates and watch towers. At the conclusion of the battery's deployment, its members were awarded 3 Bronze Star Medals, 1 Purple Heart Medal, 47 Army Commendation Medals, 74 Combat Action Badges, several memorandums of appreciation from command staff, and authorized to wear the unit shoulder sleeve insignia for wartime service from the 2nd Infantry Division, the 25th Infantry Division, the 36th Infantry Division, or the 1st Infantry Division.

In 2005 approximately 100 soldiers of the 36th Infantry Division deployed to Bosnia for Enduring Mission 3 which was a continuation from previous IFOR and SFOR missions. When Task Force Strike left Eagle Base in Tuzla late 2006, it marked the end of an American military maneuver presence in Bosnia which had existed for almost a decade after the Dayton Accords.

In 2005, over three thousand troops from the 56th BCT, 36th ID deployed to Iraq. The 3rd Battalion, 133rd Field Artillery Regiment and 2nd Battalion, 142nd Infantry Regiment were both awarded Meritorious Unit Citations for their service in Iraq.

In 2005–06, 800 soldiers of 3d Battalion, 141st Infantry Regiment, 72d Brigade, 36th Infantry Division deployed to Afghanistan. The battalion was attached to the 504th Infantry Regiment of the 82d Airborne Division and earned a Joint Meritorious Unit Citation.

In 2006, the 1st Squadron, 124th Cavalry Regiment, 36th Infantry Division became the first cavalry unit to serve as peacekeepers in the Sinai Desert for the Multinational Force and Observers. The force was made up of soldiers from several units of the 36th Infantry Division including 1–112th AR, 2–112th AR, 3–112th AR, 3rd Mech, and C Btry 2-131 FA (MLRS).

In late 2006, Company B of the 3d Battalion, 144th Infantry Regiment deployed to Iraq after pre-deployment training at Ft. Dix, NJ and were actively engaged in combat operations. They returned in late 2007. 5 Army Commendation Medals with Valor Devices were awarded to soldiers of 1st Platoon, Second Squad in recognition of the defeat of an ambush on a State Department convoy in central Baghdad.

In late 2005 to late 2006, the 36th Infantry Division was the major leading force for KFOR7, the peacekeeping mission on Kosovo.

The Combat Aviation Brigade, 36th Infantry Division shipped to Iraq in September 2006 for a planned one-year deployment.

On 7 May 2007 3d Battalion, 144th Infantry Regiment mobilized as "Task Force Panther" in support of Operation Iraqi Freedom. "Task Force Panther" trained at Camp Shelby, MS, and, after validation, deployed to Kuwait, and then into Iraq.

On 28 August 2008, more than 3000 soldiers of the 56th IBCT again deployed to Iraq. On 15 August 2009, the 3000 soldiers of the 56th IBCT returned to Texas after 10 months in Iraq. Two soldiers from Bravo Troop 3-124 Cav, and one from C Btry 4-133 were wounded during the tour.

On 10 April 2009, 136th Military Police Battalion deployed more than 150 soldiers to Afghanistan to command and run the Bagram Theatre Internment Facility. Task Force Lonestar transferred the detainees from the BTIF to the new detention facility in Parwan. 136th Military Police Battalion returned in May 2010.

On 1 October 2009, the 72nd IBCT mobilized for deployment to Iraq. Upon arrival in theater, the brigade headquarters assumed authority as the Joint Area Support Group-Conditional for the International Zone, with the brigade's subordinate elements distributed throughout the country conducting detainee operations. The brigade returned from Iraq in July and August 2010, with A Battery, 1-133 FA being the last element to return home.

In November and December 2010, the 36th Infantry Division Headquarters deployed to Basrah, Iraq, replacing the US 1st Infantry Division, where they provided command and control of US active Army, Reserve, and National Guard units. The 36th ID command covered 15,000 deployed military and contractor forces at 17 bases in the 9 provinces in southern Iraq. As part of the drawdown of US forces in Iraq, the division headquarters redeployed to the US starting in late August 2011, the main body following in September 2011 to Fort Hood, TX. No 36th ID soldiers were lost to combat operations during the deployment.

On 26 November 2011, the newly formed 1st Battalion (Airborne), 143rd Infantry Regiment mobilized as Task Force Walker for deployment to Afghanistan. The battalion, comprising companies from Texas, Rhode Island, and Alaska, was deployed across the country in support of provincial reconstruction teams. The headquarters element was located in Kabul serving under the 648th Maneuver Enhancement Brigade (Task Force Hydra) in the Kabul base cluster.

In the summer of 2012, both the 136th Maneuver Enhancement Brigade (MEB) and Task Force Arrowhead mobilized for service in Afghanistan. The 136th MEB took control of several bases in the Kabul area, while TF Arrowhead, composed of 31 security force assistance teams (SFATs), performed advisory duties with various Afghan National Security Forces (ANSF) elements in Regional Command-South.

Also in the summer of 2012 the 3rd Battalion, C & D Company 144th Infantry regiment from the 56th BCT deployed to Afghanistan (RC West) as Task Force Bowie. TF Bowie provided Battalion Command Base Security, including but not limited to presences/combat patrols, assessment missions, checkpoint control and flight line security for Shindand Airbase and surrounding areas. Shindand Air Base is located in the western part of Afghanistan in the Herat province, 7 miles northeast of the city of Sabzwar. Other areas of operations included Herat city, as well as RC North. In the fall of 2012 a small detachment was sent to RC North to assist in base security operations in coordination with small regiment from the 3rd ID.

In the spring of 2013 B co 3-144th IN deployed in support of TF 3–10 to Afghanistan and served in Konduz, Kabul, Mazar-e-Sharif Camp Bashton, and BAF

In Afghanistan, the division has deployed agricultural development teams helping build farming infrastructure, as well as security forces advising teams training Afghan national security forces to promote long-term success of the Afghan government.

The 36th Infantry Division is the first National Guard Division to command an active duty brigade as part of the Army's total force policy. This allows the active and reserve units to train together as they are preparing to fight together.

Currently, the 36th is in charge of an Afghanistan theatre; They will be in charge for 18 months (Two 9-month rotations). This is the first time a National Guard division has been in charge of an Afghanistan theatre this long.

After the September 11 terrorist attacks in 2001, the 36th ID fought in numerous military operations including Operation New Dawn, Enduring Freedom, Freedom's Sentinel, and Jump Start.

In February 2018, Army Times reported the 36th was deployed to Iraq to assist Iraqi forces against Islamic State.

== 2020–Present ==
=== COVID-19 Pandemic ===
The 36th Infantry Division assisted alongside other Texas National Guard units were activated to assist with the COVID-19 pandemic. The 36th Infantry Division assisted with delivering over 7,000 pallets of protective equipment to testing facilities, decontaminating nursing homes, and distributing over 5,900,000 COVID-19 tests.

=== Civil Disturbance ===
More Servicemembers within the 36th Infantry Division assisted in preparation for civil disturbances (rioting and looting) triggered by the George Floyd protests. The Servicemembers were trained in crowd control tactics, including non-lethal responses and assisting civilian law enforcement agencies.

=== Unit Deployment on Behalf of Operation Spartan Shield ===
Throughout the other events of 2020, over 700 servicemembers of the 36th Infantry Division were Federally Activated and deployed to the United States Central Command for Task Force Spartan, Operation Spartan Shield in September 2020. Activated Soldiers serve in Kuwait, Saudi Arabia, and Jordan. The deployment coincided with Kuwait's 30th Liberation Day, tasking the 36th Infantry Division with maintaining and continuing the United States' partnership and allied strength with Kuwait, culminating in a self-described complex live-fire exercise.

== Insignia & Song ==
An insignia consisting of an olive drab "T" on a light blue flint arrowhead was adopted by the 36th Division in 1918. Light blue is the infantry branch color. The flint arrowhead represents the State of Oklahoma (once the Indian Territory) and the "T", Texas and commonly called the "T-Patch."

The song of the 36th Infantry Division is "The Eyes of World are on you 36th." Partial lyrics are as follow:

Here's to the troops of the 36th
Theirs is the spirit that's never licked
Victory for they who fight the fight for right
They're the troops of the 36th Division

The eyes of the world are on you 36th
The 36th, the 36th Division
When the road is rough and when the fight is tough
There'll always be the 36th Division

Our hopes and our prayers go with you
Freedom depends upon you
So fight right on until the dawn and keep your weapons fixed
The eyes of the world are on you 36th

== Division organization in 2026 ==
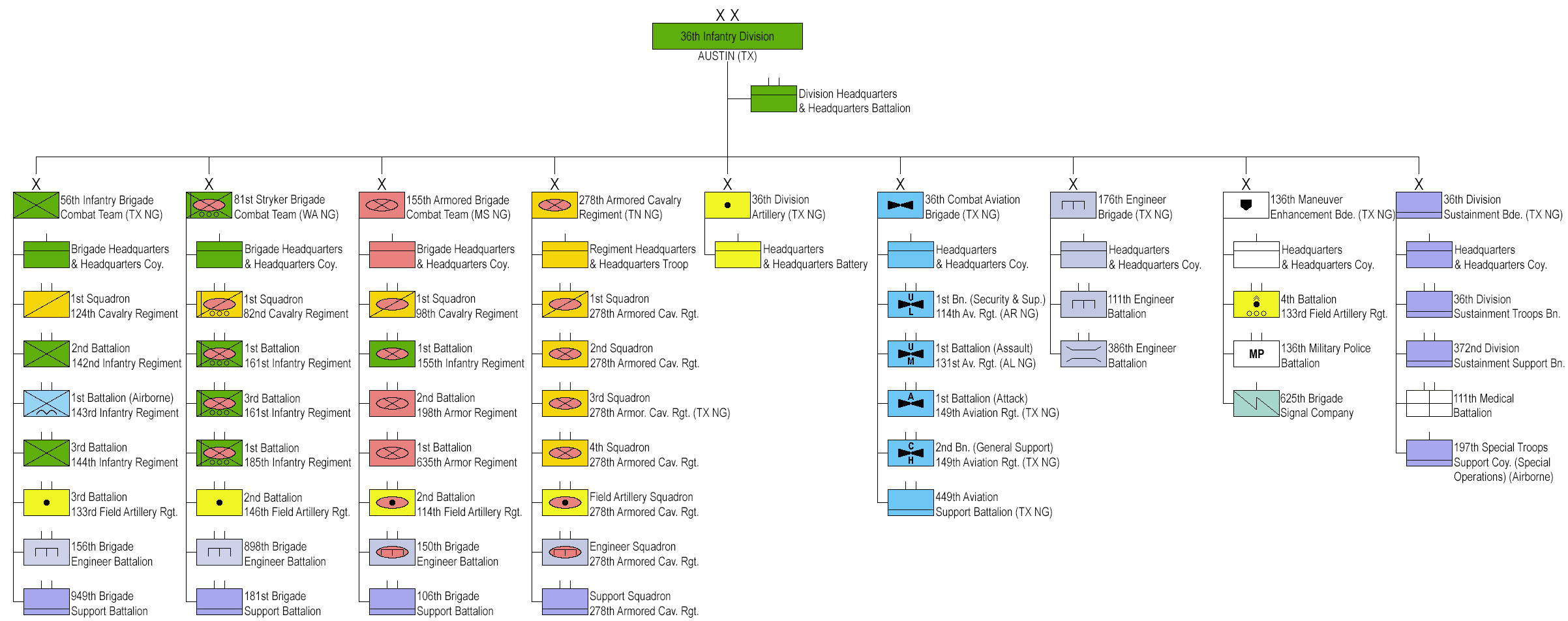
36th Infantry Division organization October 2026 (click to enlarge)

As of May 2023 the 36th Infantry Division exercises training and readiness oversight of a division headquarters and headquarters battalion, and eleven brigade-size formations from the states of Texas, New Mexico, Mississippi, Washington, and Tennessee. These Formations include Two Texas Army National Guard Infantry Brigade Combat Teams (the 56th and 72nd Infantry Brigade Combat Teams), a Washington Army National Guard Stryker Brigade Combat Team (the 81st Stryker Brigade Combat Team), a Mississippi Army National Guard Armored Brigade Combat Team (the 155th Armored Brigade Combat Team), a Tennessee Army National Guard Cavalry Regiment (the 278th Cavalry Regiment), The 36th Division Artillery, The 36th Combat Aviation Brigade, The 36th Sustainment Brigade, a Maneuver Enhancement Brigade, an Engineer Brigade, and an additional Sustainment Brigade. In addition, the 36th infantry division formally contained The 256th infantry brigade combat team from the Louisiana Army National Guard.

- 36th Infantry Division (TX NG)
  - Division Headquarters and Headquarters Battalion
  - 56th Infantry Brigade Combat Team (TX NG)
    - Headquarters and Headquarters Company
    - 1st Squadron, 124th Cavalry Regiment
    - 2nd Battalion, 142rd Infantry Regiment
    - 1st Battalion (Airborne), 143rd Infantry Regiment
    - 3rd Battalion, 144th Infantry Regiment
    - 156th Brigade Engineer Battalion
  - 81st Mobile Brigade Combat Team (WA NG)
    - Headquarters and Headquarters Company
    - 1st Battalion, 161st Infantry Regiment
    - 3rd Battalion, 161st Infantry Regiment
    - 1st Battalion, 204th Infantry Regiment (UT NG)
  - 155th Armored Brigade Combat Team (MS NG)
    - Headquarters and Headquarters Company
    - 1st Squadron, 98th Cavalry Regiment
    - 1st Battalion, 155th Infantry Regiment
    - 2nd Battalion, 198th Armor Regiment
    - 1st Battalion, 635th Armor Regiment (KS NG)
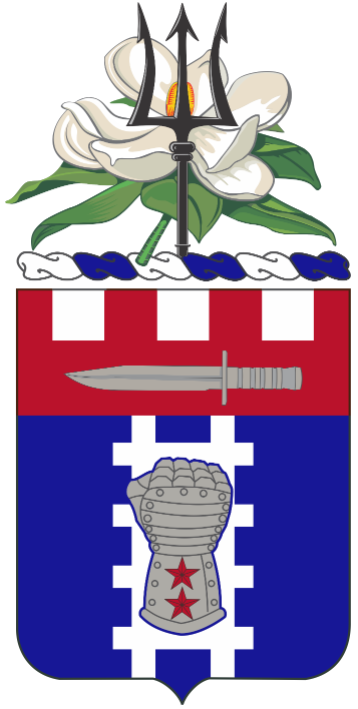
    - 150th Brigade Engineer Battalion
  - 278th Cavalry Regiment (MBCT) (TN NG)
    - Headquarters and Headquarters Troop
    - 1st Infantry Battalion, 278th Cavalry Regiment (MBCT)
    - 2nd Infantry Battalion, 278th Cavalry Regiment (MBCT)
    - 3rd Infantry Battalion, 278th Cavalry Regiment (MBCT) (TX NG)
  - 36th Division Artillery
    - Headquarters and Headquarters Battery
    - 2nd Battalion, 114th Field Artillery Regiment (MS NG; supports 155th Armored Brigade Combat Team)
    - 1st Battalion, 115th Field Artillery Regiment (TN NG; supports 278th Cavalry Regiment (MBCT))
    - 3rd Battalion, 133rd Field Artillery Regiment (TX NG; supports 56th Infantry Brigade Combat Team )
    - 2nd Battalion, 146th Field Artillery Regiment (WA NG; supports 81st Mobile Brigade Combat Team)
  - 36th Combat Aviation Brigade (TX NG)
    - Headquarters and Headquarters Company
    - 1st Battalion, 114th Aviation Regiment (Security and Support) (AR NG)
    - 1st Battalion, 131st Aviation Regiment (Assault) (AL NG)
    - 1st Battalion, 149th Aviation Regiment (Attack/Recon) (TX NG)
    - 2nd Battalion, 149th Aviation Regiment (General Support) (TX NG)
    - 449th Aviation Support Battalion (TX NG)
  - 36th Division Sustainment Brigade
    - Headquarters and Headquarters Company
    - 36th Division Sustainment Troops Battalion
    - 106th Brigade Support Battalion (MS NG; supports 155th Armored Brigade Combat Team)
    - 111th Medical Battalion (attached)
    - 181st Light Support Battalion (WA NG; supports 81st Mobile Brigade Combat Team)
    - 372nd Division Sustainment Support Battalion
    - 473rd Light Support Battalion (TN NG; supports 278th Cavalry Regiment (MBCT))
    - 949th Brigade Support Battalion (TX NG; supports 56th Infantry Brigade Combat Team)
    - 197th Special Troops Support Company (Special Operations) (Airborne) (attached unit of the 19th Special Forces Group)
  - 136th Maneuver Enhancement Brigade — will convert to a Protection Brigade
    - Headquarters and Headquarters Company
    - 4th Battalion, 133rd Field Artillery Regiment (attached M142 HIMARS battalion, operationally assigned to 45th Field Artillery Brigade)
    - 136th Military Police Battalion
    - 625th Brigade Signal Company
  - 176th Engineer Brigade
    - Headquarters and Headquarters Company
    - 111th Engineer Battalion
    - 386th Engineer Battalion
  - 111th Sustainment Brigade (NM NG, Divisional Alignment Program associated unit)
    - Headquarters and Headquarters Company
    - 111th Special Troops Battalion
    - 515th Combat Sustainment Support Battalion
    - 615th Transportation Battalion.

Former Units

- 256th Infantry Brigade Combat Team (LA NG)
  - Headquarters and Headquarters Company
  - 2nd Squadron, 108th Cavalry Regiment
  - 2nd Battalion, 156th Infantry Regiment
  - 3rd Battalion, 156th Infantry Regiment
  - 1st Battalion, 173rd Infantry Regiment
  - 1st Battalion, 141st Field Artillery Regiment
  - 769th Brigade Engineer Battalion
  - 199th Brigade Support Battalion

== Division commanders ==
36th Infantry Division
Start date	End date	Commander
25 August 1917	18 September 1917	MG Edwin St. John Greble
18 September 1917	6 December 1917	BG George Blakely
6 December 1917	8 July 1918	MG Edwin St. John Greble
8 July 1918	13 July 1918	BG John A. Hulen
13 July 1918		MG William R. Smith
	18 June 1919	Division returned activated to state control
	2 May 1923	MG William R. Smith
2 May 1923	9 September 1935	MG John A. Hulen
9 September 1935	12 October 1936	MG George R. Rains
12 October 1936		MG Claude V. Birkhead
25 November 1940		Division called up to federal service
	12 September 1941	MG Claude V. Birkhead
12 September 1941	7 July 1944	MG Fred L. Walker
7 July 1944	1 November 1945	MG John E. Dahlquist
1 November 1944	15 December 1945	BG Robert I. Stack
	15 December 1945	Division returned inactive to state control
29 April 1946		Unit reactivated in state control
29 April 1946	7 July 1948	MG Preston A. Weatherred
7 July 1948	1 March 1953	MG H. Miller Ainsworth
1 March 1953	21 September 1961	MG Carl L. Phinney
21 September 1961	15 January 1968	MG Everett S. Simpson
	18 June 1969	Division inactivated in state control
1 May 2004		Division reactivated in state control
1 May 2004	1 April 2006	MG Michael Taylor
1 April 2006	1 October 2007	MG John T. Furlow
1 October 2007	17 April 2009	MG Jose S. Mayorga
18 April 2009	20 January 2012	MG Eddy M. Spurgin
21 January 2012	31 May 2014	MG James K. "Red" Brown
1 June 2014	30 April 2017	MG Lester Simpson
1 May 2017	3 Sept 2018	MG S. Lee Henry
4 Sept 2018	30 October 2021	MG Patrick M. Hamilton
30 October 2021	17 March 2022	MG Charles K. Aris
17 March 2022	31 May 2024	MG Ronald W. Burkett II
31 May 2024	Present	MG John B. Bowlin

Gallery at the Texas Military Forces Museum

MG Claude V. Birkhead

MG John E. Dahlquist

BG John A. Hulen

== See also ==
- 549th Engineer Light Ponton Company

== Notable people ==
- Raymond S. McLain
