= Marmaduke Military Academy =

Military school in Missouri, United States

Marmaduke Military Academy was a boys' military school that operated in Sweet Springs, Missouri, from 1891 to 1896.

In 1891, Charles T. Farrar and Frank R. Tate purchased a defunct resort hotel in Sweet Springs and established Marmaduke Military Academy to "develop soldier-like qualities and to make capable men." The salt and sulphur springs in Saline County, Missouri, attracted cadets and vacationers to the small town. In fact, the owners leased out the academy in the summers to use as a resort once again. Each night, a St. Louis orchestra would play in the ballroom/gymnasium, and lawn croquet was a favorite game.

An 1892 article in Outing magazine, "Military Schools of the United States" (pp 330,388,473), identifies Marmaduke as the state-chartered military school for Missouri, suggesting that it received some state funding.

One of the instructors at Marmaduke was Harris L. Moore, son of John Courtney Moore, who had been a second in a duel fought by General John S. Marmaduke, a Confederate officer who would later serve as governor of Missouri from 1885 to 1887. Harris graduated from the University of Missouri in 1892 and taught at Marmaduke for three years starting in 1893. He would go on to have a distinguished legal career and was at the time of his early death, a Circuit Court Judge.

In 1896, the barracks/resort burned to the ground. The owners sold their assets to Wentworth Military Academy in Lexington, Missouri. Among the Marmaduke faculty who moved on to Wentworth was bandmaster E. J. Stark, later to become a noted ragtime composer.

Robert James, son of former outlaw Frank James, won a subscription contest sponsored by the Dallas Morning News. The prize was a scholarship to Marmaduke Military Academy; Robert later went on to serve in the United States military during the Spanish-American War.
