= John Augustus Hulen =

United States Army general

John A. Hulen
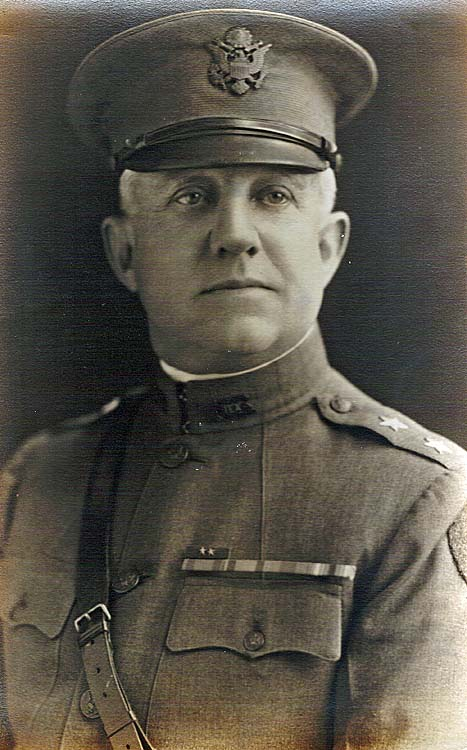
- Born: September 9, 1871; Centralia, Missouri, US
- Died: September 13, 1957 (aged 86); Palacios, Texas, US
- Spouse: Frankie L. Race
- Military career
- Allegiance: United States
- Branch: United States Army
- Service years: 1898–1935
- Rank: Major General (Army); Lieutenant General (Retired list)
- Service number: 0-204374
- Unit: Texas National Guard
- Commands: 36th Infantry Division
- Conflicts: Spanish–American War; Philippine Insurrection; Mexican Punitive Expedition; World War I

John Augustus Hulen (September 9, 1871 – September 13, 1957) was an officer of the Texas National Guard from 1898 to 1935 and Adjutant General of Texas. Hulen served during the Spanish–American War, Philippine Insurrection, Mexican Punitive Expedition, and World War I. At his retirement in 1935, Hulen received a state promotion to lieutenant general to recognize the distinguished service he rendered throughout his long career.

== Early life ==
John Augustus Hulen was born to Harvey Hulen and Fanny Morter Hulen in Centralia, Missouri. Hulen graduated Marmaduke Military Academy in 1891. Hulen worked with his father in real estate and insurance in Gainesville, Texas. Hulen held many positions for local railroads in Texas. Hulen was president of the Railway Managers Association of Texas. He also served as director of the Fort Worth National Bank and Second National Bank of Houston.

== Military career ==
John Augustus Hulen was the commander of Troop D of the First Texas Volunteer Cavalry until the Spanish–American War. In 1898, Hulen was sent to the Philippines as lieutenant colonel. Hulen fought in northern Luzon for two years as captain for the 33rd United States Volunteer infantry. Hulen was promoted to brigadier general by Governor Samuel Willis Tucker Lanham.

Hulen retired in 1907, but was recalled into service in 1916. From 1916 to 1917, Hulen patrolled the Texas-Mexico Border as commander of the Sixth Separate Brigade. At Austin, Hulen assisted in the reorganization of the state militia into the 36th Infantry Brigade.

During World War I, Hulen commanded the 72nd Brigade of the 36th Division and winning the Distinguished Service Medal and the Croix de Guerre. From 1922 to 1935, Hulen was appointed major general of the Texas National Guard and commander of the 36th Infantry division. In 1935, Governor James Allred promoted Hulen to the militia's highest rank of lieutenant general.

== Later life ==
Toward the end of his military career, Hulen became the director of Texas Tech University from 1931 to 1937. Hulen was a delegate to the Democratic National Convention in 1932. In 1941, Franklin D. Roosevelt appointed Hulen to regional salvage manager of the War Production Board. Hulen was also traffic manager of Fort Worth and the Wichita Valley Hulen Railroad Company. Hulen retired in 1941 and lived in Palacios, Texas until his death on September 13, 1957.

== Relations ==
Hulen married Frankie L. Race and had no children.

== Honors and awards ==
=== Distinguished Service Medal ===
==== Citation ====
The President of the United States of America, authorized by Act of Congress, July 9, 1918, takes pleasure in presenting the Army Distinguished Service Medal to Brigadier General John A. Hulen, United States Army, for exceptionally meritorious and distinguished services to the Government of the United States, in a duty of great responsibility during World War I, while Commanding the 72d Infantry Brigade of the 36th Division in the Meuse-Argonne offensive from 8 to 28 October 1918.
