= Clayton P. Kerr =

American general (1900–1977)

Clayton P. Kerr OCI
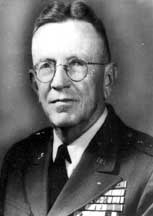
- Kerr as a major general, circa 1958.
- Born: August 16, 1900; Denver, Colorado, US
- Died: August 13, 1977 (aged 76); Dallas, Texas, US
- Burial place: Sparkman-Hillcrest Memorial Park Cemetery
- Military career
- Allegiance: United States
- Branch: United States Army
- Service years: 1918–1962
- Rank: Major General (Army); Lieutenant General (Texas National Guard)
- Units: Texas Army National Guard; Army National Guard
- Commands: 2nd Battalion, 144th Infantry Regiment; Combat Command B, 49th Armored Division; 49th Armored Division Artillery; 49th Armored Division; Army National Guard
- Conflicts: World War I World War II
- Awards: Distinguished Service Medal (U.S. Army); Legion of Merit; Bronze Star Medal; Hall of Honor
- Other work: Owner, home building and construction company

Clayton P. Kerr (August 16, 1900 – August 13, 1977) was a major general in the United States Army. A longtime member of the Texas Army National Guard, he was prominent for his service as deputy commander of the Allied Military Mission to the Italian Army during World War II, and his post-war assignments as commander of the 49th Armored Division and Director of the Army National Guard.

Born in Denver, Colorado and raised and Dallas, Texas, in 1918 joined the Texas National Guard. He quickly advanced through the noncommissioned officer ranks to become sergeant major of the 72nd Infantry Brigade. In 1922, he received his commission as a second lieutenant in the 56th Cavalry Brigade, and he advanced through the ranks in command and staff positions, primarily as a member of the Texas National Guard's 36th Infantry Division.

During World War II, Kerr served in Europe as the 36th Division's inspector general and chief of staff, and later as U.S. Representative to and Deputy Commander of the Allied Military Mission to the Italian Army. After the war he was an original organizer of the 49th Armored Division. In 1958, he became the division commander as a major general, and in 1959 Kerr was selected to serve as Chief of the Army Division (now Director of the Army National Guard) at the National Guard Bureau. He served in this position until his 1962 retirement. In 1964, received a state promotion to lieutenant general as recognition of his accomplishments and years of service.

Kerr died in Dallas in 1977, and was buried at Sparkman-Hillcrest Memorial Park Cemetery.

== Early life ==
Clayton Price Kerr was born in Denver, Colorado on August 16, 1900, the son of Harry Basil Kerr, a veteran of the Spanish–American War, and Rosa Mae (Taylor) Kerr. He was raised and educated in Dallas, Texas, and graduated from Bryan High School in 1919. In September 1918, he joined the National Guard as a member of Headquarters Troop, 6th Texas Cavalry, and he took part in patrols of the Texas-Mexico border during the closing months of World War I. In March 1919, he was scheduled to take the entrance examination for the United States Military Academy, but opted instead to continue his National Guard career. He quickly advanced through the noncommissioned officer ranks, and became sergeant major of the 72nd Infantry Brigade.

In 1921 he received his commission as a second lieutenant in the 56th Cavalry Brigade. He advanced through the ranks in command and staff positions, primarily with the 36th Infantry Division. His commands included Company E, 144th Infantry Regiment and 2nd Battalion, 144th Infantry. In 1940, Kerr authored a military handbook, Pointers for Infantry Troop Leaders, which went through several editions, and was used during both World War II and the Korean War.

In his civilian career Kerr became the owner and operator of a home construction and contracting business.

== World War II ==
In November 1940, Kerr entered active duty as inspector general of the 36th Division, and he later served as executive officer of the 72nd Infantry Brigade before becoming the division's chief of staff in 1942. He served in this position until 1944, and took part in the North African and Italian campaigns. In February 1944, he was assigned as deputy commander of the Allied Military Mission to the Italian Army. In this role, he worked to integrate Italian forces into the Allied war effort following the overthrow of Benito Mussolini's dictatorship, including participation in the 1945 offensive which brought about the surrender of Nazi forces in Italy. After the war, Kerr negotiated with the Italian government for land on which to place a monument to commemorate the 36th Division's 1943 landing at Salerno. Kerr was a frequent contributor of articles to professional journals and other publications, including 1944's "Joint Maintenance in Theater Operations". In addition, he authored a 1945 article on the operations of U.S. forces in the Pacific Ocean and South West Pacific theaters, "The Organization of the Pacific Ocean Areas and of the Southwest Pacific Area".

== Post World War II ==
Kerr was one of the original officers who formed the Texas Army National Guard’s 49th Armored Division. Among his assignments with the division was commander of Combat Command B, and commander of the Division Artillery. He was promoted to brigadier general in 1947.

By the time Kerr became a general officer, income from part-ownership in a chemical plant, real estate holdings, and investments enabled him to work full time for the Texas National Guard in an unpaid status. In 1958 Kerr was appointed commander of the 49th Armored Division and promoted to major general. Kerr continued to author articles on military topics, including 1959's "Training an Army National Guard Armored Division".

== National Guard Bureau ==
In October, 1959 Kerr was named Chief of the Army Division (now Director of the Army National Guard) at the National Guard Bureau. He served in this position until his 1962 retirement. As the head of the Army National Guard, Kerr oversaw its efforts to modify unit organizations as part of the Reorganization of Army Divisions (ROAD) program. In addition, he led efforts to modernize equipment and vehicles, and to enhance individual and unit training, which led to improved overall readiness levels.

== Military education ==
Kerr completed the Army officer courses for Infantry, Field Artillery, Air Defense Artillery, and Armor. In addition, he was a graduate of the United States Army Command and General Staff College.

== Awards and decorations ==
Kerr's awards include: the Distinguished Service Medal; two awards of the Legion of Merit; and the Bronze Star Medal.

His foreign decorations included: Officer of the Order of the British Empire; Grand Commander, Order of Saints Maurice and Lazarus (Italy); War Cross for Military Valor (Italy); Grand Officer of the Order of the Crown of Italy; War Merit Cross (Italy); and Knight Commander of the Sovereign Military Order of Malta (Italy).

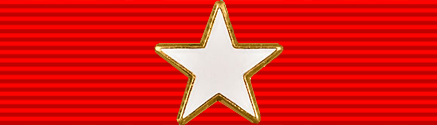
Distinguished Service Medal
Legion of Merit (2)
Bronze Star Medal
Officer of the Order of the British Empire
Grand Commander of the Order of Saints Maurice and Lazarus (Italy)
War Cross for Military Valor (Italy)
War Merit Cross (Italy)
Grand Officer of the Order of the Crown of Italy
Knight Commander of the Sovereign Military Order of Malta (Italy)
Lone Star Distinguished Service Medal

In 1964 Governor John Connally recognized Kerr's accomplishments and long years of dedicated service with a state promotion to lieutenant general.

Kerr was inducted into the Texas Military Hall of Honor in 1981.

== Death and burial ==
Kerr died in Dallas on August 13, 1977. He was buried at Sparkman-Hillcrest Memorial Park Cemetery in Dallas.

== Family ==
Kerr was married to Clara Elizabeth Corbin (1900–1999). They had no children.
