= 49th Armored Division =

- 49th Armored Division shoulder sleeve insignia
- Active: 2 July 1946–15 January 1968; 15 January 1968–1 November 1973 (reflagged as 72nd Inf. Bge.); 1 November 1973–18 July 2004
- Country: United States of America
- Branch: United States Army
- Type: Armor
- Role: Armored warfare
- Size: Division
- Garrison/HQ: Camp Mabry
- Nickname: "Lone Star"

Commanders
- Notable commanders: Clayton P. Kerr

Insignia
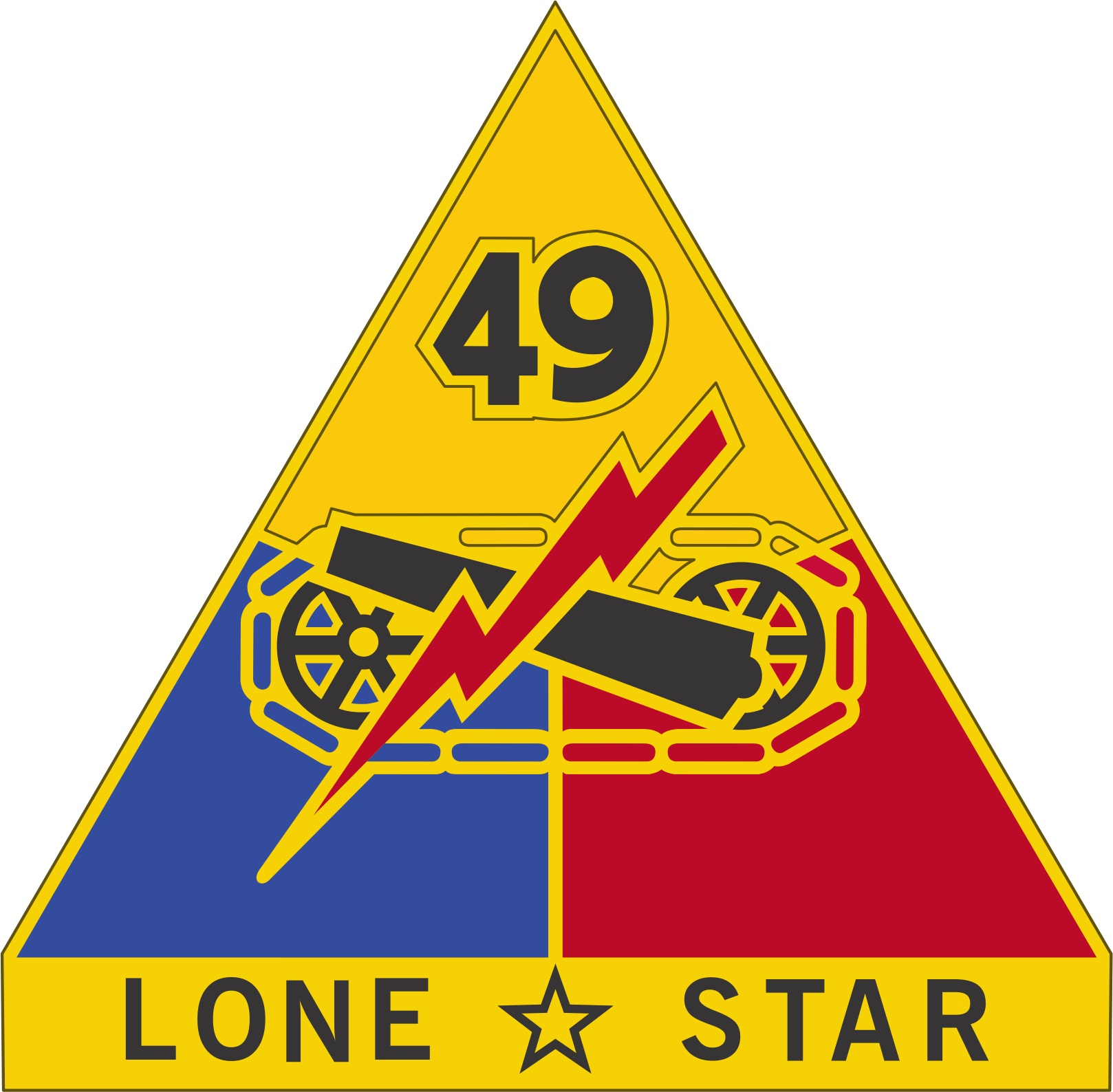
- Distinctive unit insignia

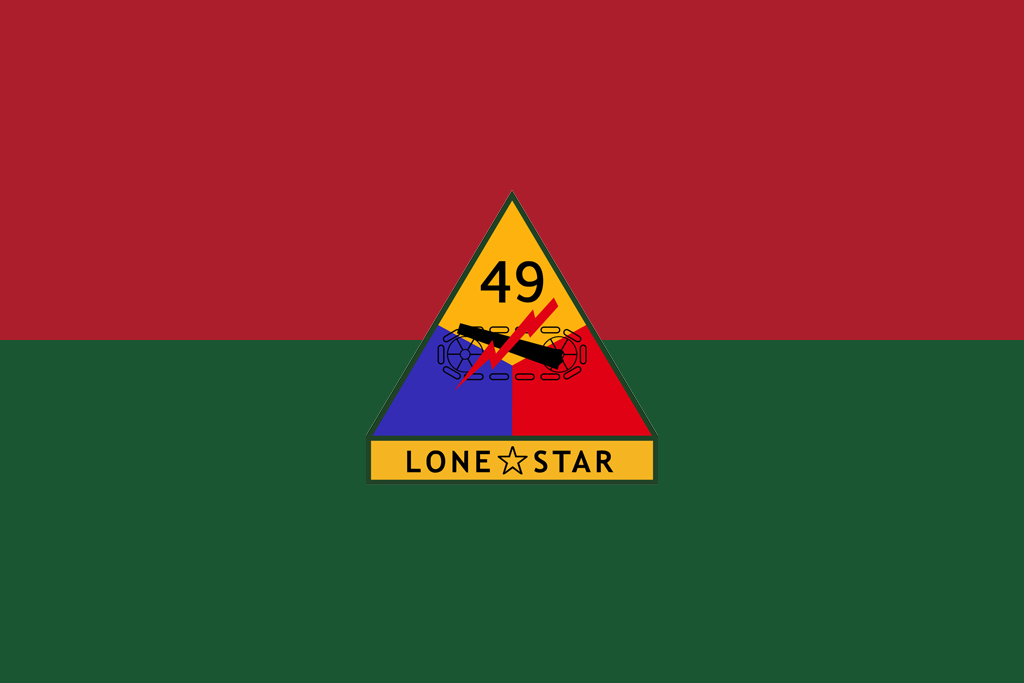
- Flag of the United States Army 49th Armored Division

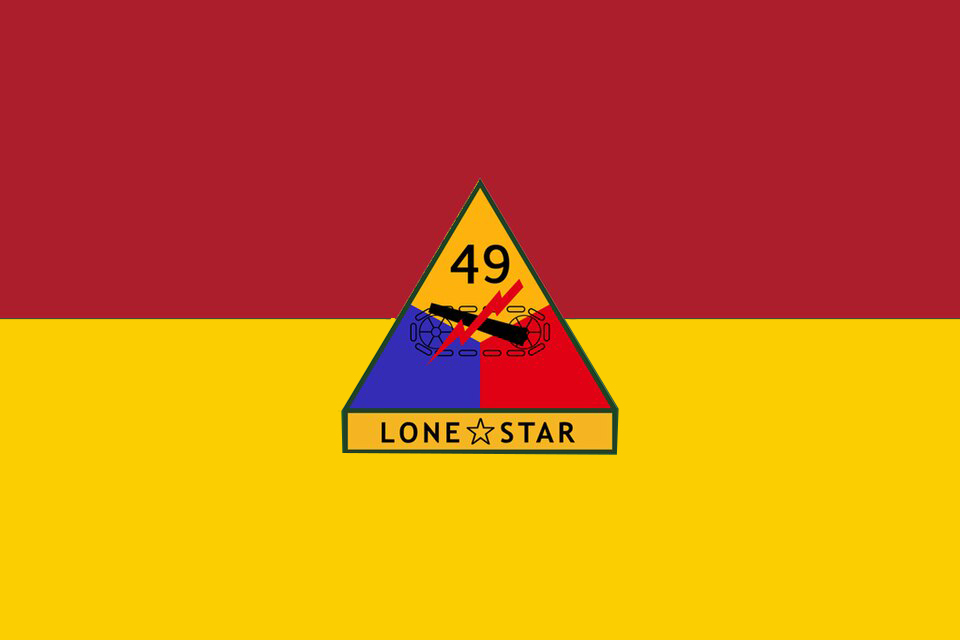
- Flag of the United States Army 49th Armored Division 2nd Version
NATO Map Symbol
49

The 49th Armored Division —nicknamed the "Lone Star"— was an armored division of the Texas Army National Guard during the Cold War.

Active from 1947, the division formed part of the Texas Army National Guard together with the 36th Infantry Division. It was called up for active duty between 1961 and 1962 during the Berlin Crisis. In 1968 both Texas divisions were inactivated and used to form separate units. The 49th Armored was reformed in 1973 as the sole Texas division. When reflagged as the 36th Infantry Division in 2004, it was the last armored division remaining in the Army National Guard.

== History ==
After the end of World War II, the National Guard of the United States was divided into two reorganised components, the Army National Guard and Air National Guard. The initial War Department Army National Guard troop basis submitted to the states for review in early February 1946 gave the 49th Armored Division to Texas and New Mexico. New Mexico was receive one combat command headquarters and its subordinate units as well as field artillery and engineer battalions. But the governor of New Mexico desired to continue his state's prewar antiaircraft units. Therefore the 49th Armored Division was made all-Texas and New Mexico received the 111th Antiaircraft Artillery Brigade.

The division, whose units were accepted by the Texas adjutant general on 2 July 1946, included two combat commands and a reserve command with the 145th, 146th, and 147th Tank Battalions and the 145th, 146th, and 147th Armored Infantry Battalions. The division artillery included the 105 mm howitzer-equipped 645th, 646th, and 647th Armored Field Artillery Battalions. Division troops included the 49th Mechanized Cavalry Reconnaissance Squadron and the 386th Armored Engineer Battalion as well as other support units. It and the New Jersey 50th Armored Division were the only armored divisions in the National Guard at the time. A number of the original divisional units received federal recognition from the National Guard Bureau on 27 February 1947, a date used thereafter as the formation's "birthday", including the division headquarters at Camp Mabry in Austin. In 1947, all four battalions of the 144th Infantry Regiment were placed into the Division as mechanized infantry units. The division headquarters location changed to Fort Worth on 4 August 1949 and to Dallas on 31 August 1950. Beginning in the northern and northeastern areas of the State, there were 111 units in 56 Texas cities by 1952.

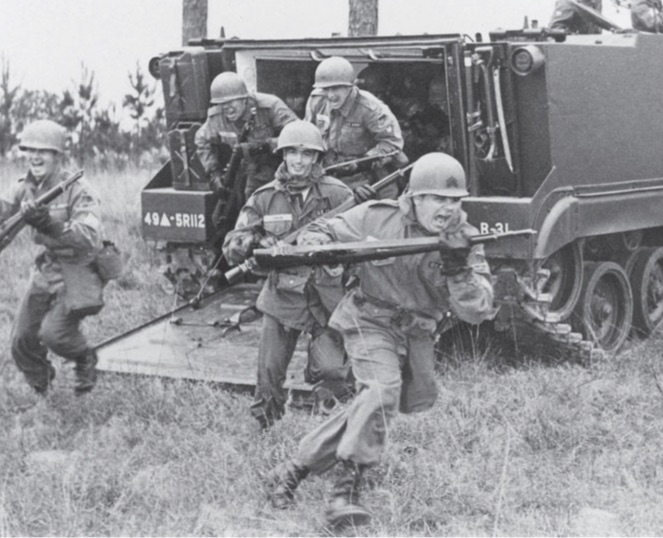
Soldiers of the division dismount from an M113 armored personnel carrier of the 5th Battalion, 112th Armor during an exercise at Fort Polk, 1961

In September 1961, an executive order alerted the division for mobilization at Dallas due to the 1961 Berlin Crisis. The 49th Armored and the Wisconsin 32nd Infantry Division were mobilized in order to replace active divisions scheduled to be deployed from the strategic reserve. On 15 October the division entered federal service and soon afterwards concentrated at Fort Hood. It subsequently deployed to Fort Polk, Louisiana, where it remained for ten months. In May 1962, the division staged the large-scale Exercise Iron Dragoon, still remembered among National Guard armor exercises. Also while at Fort Polk the division's missile unit became the first Army National Guard unit to fire the Honest John nuclear-tipped surface-to-surface missile. The 49th Armored Division reverted to Texas State control in August 1962 after the newly reformed active duty 1st Armored and 5th Infantry Divisions were ready to take the place of it and the 32nd Infantry Division in the strategic reserve.

The 49th Armored reorganized under the Reorganization Objective Army Division (ROAD) structure in March 1963. Under the ROAD structure, the division included four mechanized infantry battalions and five armor battalions.

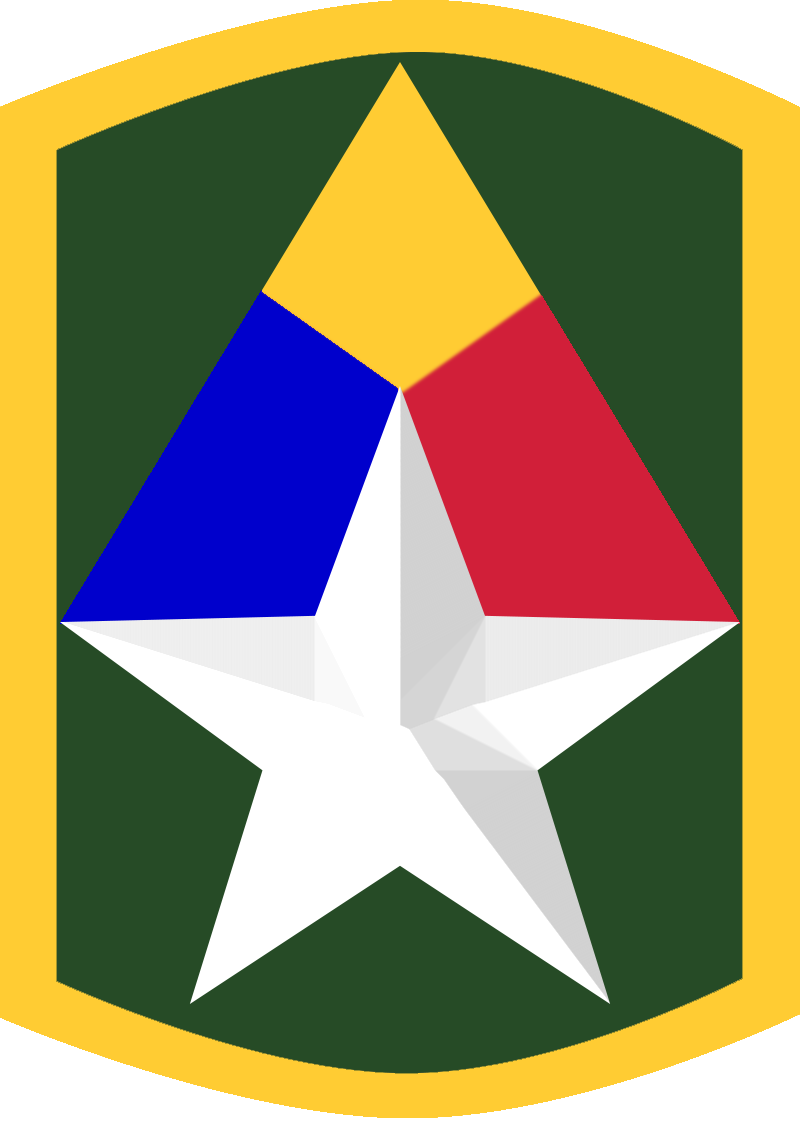
49th Armored Brigade SSI

The 49th Armored was inactivated in 1968. Their units were used to form the 71st Airborne Brigade, the 72nd Infantry Brigade (Mechanized), and the 49th Armor Group. The 49th Armor Group became the 49th Armored Brigade on 1 September 1971. A Department of Defense directive to the army to convert six National Guard brigades from infantry to armor in order to act as reinforcements for troops in Europe in event of war resulted in the reactivation of the division, headquartered at Camp Mabry, on 1 November 1973. The reorganized 49th Armored consisted of five mechanized and six armor battalions; it and the 50th Armored were once again the only National Guard armored divisions. For the rest of its existence, the 49th, as the only Texas Army National Guard division, formed the bulk of the force. The division accounted for 14,854 personnel out of the 17,643 authorized for the Texas Army National Guard in 1976. The 1st Battalion, 200th Air Defense Artillery of the New Mexico Army National Guard was added as the divisional anti-aircraft gun battalion on 1 September 1975.

The division was reorganized as a heavy division in 1985 under the Army of Excellence structure together with the 50th Armored and the 35th and 40th Infantry Divisions. Thus, the division included four mechanized and six armor battalions by 1989. Due to equipment security concerns, the Army Reserve 549th Military Intelligence Battalion fulfilled the electronic warfare and intelligence role for the division, as in all but one of the National Guard divisions.

=== Structure 1988/89 ===
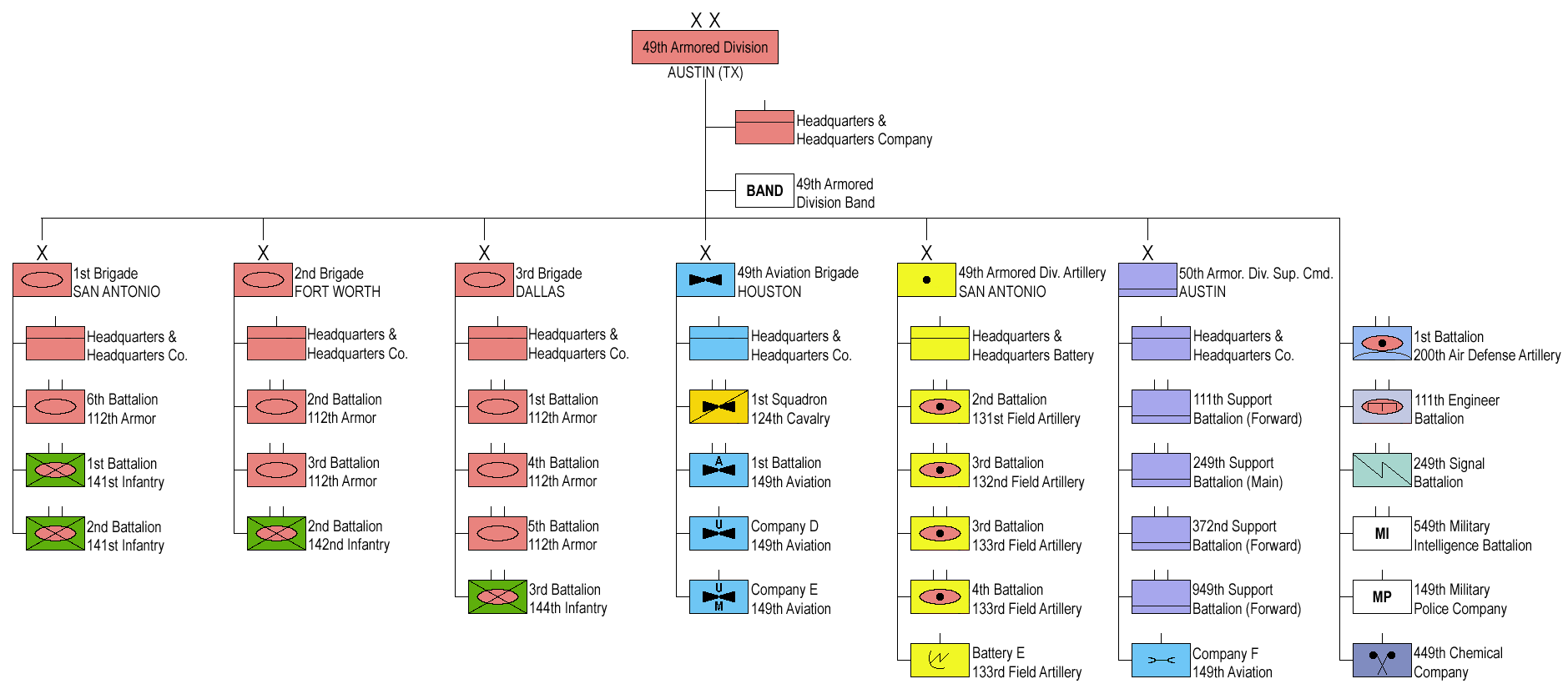
49th Armored Division 1989 (click to enlarge)

On 1 June 1988 the division ceded some of its units, including the 1st Battalion, 133rd Field Artillery to the 36th Brigade, 50th Armored Division, which had been activated on that day. 3rd Battalion, 132nd Field Artillery was reactivated at El Paso to replace the 1st Battalion, 133rd Field Artillery.

- 49th Armored Division, Austin
  - Headquarters & Headquarters Company
  - 1st Brigade, San Antonio
    - Headquarters & Headquarters Company
    - 6th Battalion, 112th Armor, El Campo
    - 1st Battalion, 141st Infantry, San Antonio
    - 2nd Battalion, 141st Infantry, Corpus Christi
  - 2nd Brigade, Fort Worth
    - Headquarters & Headquarters Company
    - 2nd Battalion, 112th Armor, Fort Worth
    - 3rd Battalion, 112th Armor, Brownwood
    - 2nd Battalion, 142nd Infantry, Amarillo
  - 3rd Brigade, Dallas
    - Headquarters & Headquarters Company
    - 1st Battalion, 112th Armor, Dallas
    - 4th Battalion, 112th Armor, Dallas
    - 5th Battalion, 112th Armor, Marshall
    - 3rd Battalion, 144th Infantry, Terrell
  - 49th Aviation Brigade, Houston
    - Headquarters & Headquarters Company
    - 1st Squadron, 124th Cavalry (Reconnaissance), Waco
    - 1st Battalion, 149th Aviation (Attack), Houston
    - Company D, 149th Aviation (Command Support), San Antonio
    - Company E, 149th Aviation (Assault), Dallas (UH-1H Iroquois)
  - 49th Armored Division Artillery (DIVARTY), San Antonio
    - Headquarters & Headquarters Battery
    - 2nd Battalion, 131st Field Artillery, Wichita Falls (12 × M110A2 203 mm self-propelled howitzers)
    - 3rd Battalion, 132nd Field Artillery, San Angelo (18 × M109A3 155 mm self-propelled howitzers)
    - 3rd Battalion, 133rd Field Artillery, El Paso (18 × M109A3 155 mm self-propelled howitzers)
    - 4th Battalion, 133rd Field Artillery, New Braunfels (18 × M109A3 155 mm self-propelled howitzers)
    - Battery E, 133rd Field Artillery (Target Acquisition), San Antonio
  - 49th Armored Division Support Command (DISCOM), Austin
    - Headquarters & Headquarters Company
    - 111th Support Battalion (Forward), San Antonio
    - 249th Support Battalion (Main), Austin
    - 372nd Support Battalion (Forward), Dallas
    - 949th Support Battalion (Forward), Fort Worth
    - Company F, 149th Aviation (Aviation Intermediate Maintenance), San Antonio
  - 111th Engineer Battalion, Abilene
  - 1st Battalion, 200th Air Defense Artillery, Roswell (New Mexico Army National Guard) (MIM-72 Chaparral, M163 Vulcan & FIM-92 Stinger)
  - 249th Signal Battalion, Dallas
  - 549th Military Intelligence Battalion, Austin (Army Reserve)
  - 149th Military Police Company, San Antonio
  - 449th Chemical Company, Laredo

The brigade's armor battalions were equipped with M60A3 TTS main battle tanks. M48A5 Patton tanks had been replaced by M60A3 TTS tanks by May 1987 and by the end of 1989 the National Guard fielded 3,072 M60A3 TTS. The 410 M1 Abrams tanks of the National Guard were issued to round-out units of army divisions. The division's infantry battalions were equipped with M113 armored personnel carriers, of which the National Guard had 6,870 at the end of Fiscal Year 1987, with a further 1,411 due to be taken in service in 1988. The standard helicopters of National Guard units were the AH-1S Cobra, of which the National Guard had approximately 350 by 1989, the OH-58C Kiowa and the UH-1H Iroquois helicopters. Cavalry Reconnaissance units fielded 19 × M60A3 TTS, 8 × AH-1S Cobra, 12 × OH-58C Kiowa and 1 × UH-1H Iroquois helicopters; attack battalions fielded 21 × AH-1S Cobra, 13 × OH-58C Kiowa and 3 × UH-1H Iroquois helicopters, while the assault aviation company fielded 15 × UH-1H Iroquois helicopters and the command support aviation company UH-1 helicopters in various configurations.

=== Locations 1989 ===
49th Armored Division key locations 1989 (without DISCOM):
Division/brigade headquarters Infantry Armor
Aviation Artillery Engineers Other units

=== Recent History ===
In 2000 elements of the division were deployed to take over the command and control of Multi-National Division (North) (MND-N) of the Stabilization Force in Bosnia (SFOR) as well as fulfill support missions for the MND-N troops. The division headquarters, aviation brigade headquarters, 249th Signal Battalion headquarters, the headquarters and Companies A and C of the 111th Engineer Battalion, the 649th Military Intelligence Battalion, the 149th Military Police Company, 1149th CID Detachment, 149th Personnel Services Battalion, 1104th Movement Control Team, and Company H, 149th Aviation (Air Traffic Support) were deployed.

In January 2004, Alpha Company of 1st Squadron, 124th Cavalry Regiment (United States), 180 Soldiers, were mobilized to serve in Operation Iraqi Freedom. They came from Waco, Texas, leaving on 23 January 2004. Their pre-deployment training took place at Fort Dix, and then they deployed to the Sunni Triangle. They saw action in and around Baghdad, and served as security for the 89th Military Police Brigade. For their actions while deployed, they would be awarded the Texas Cavalry Medal, several Texas Purple Heart Medals, as well as an Army Meritorious Unit Commendation. They would remain in Iraq until May of 2005, after they had been re-flagged to the 36th Infantry Division. For the time before the de-activation of the 49th Armored Division, these soldiers were the first and only soldiers to see action in the Division's history.

On 18 July 2004 the division was re-flagged and again designated as the 36th Infantry Division. Prior to its redesignation, the 49th was cap-stoned to the U.S. Army III Corps and stood as the only fully functional, reserve component, armored division in the United States Army. (The 50th Armored Division in the north eastern states had been eliminated by consolidation with the 42nd Infantry Division in the early 1990s.)

The Newly designated Troops came home after a year of deployment, with only a few wounded, and fortunately, no dead. They were the first Texas National Guardsmen to deploy since WWII. They are the last soldiers that were allowed to wear the 49th Armored patch as a battle patch. They would also be awarded the coveted Texas Cavalry Service Medal, as well as the wounded receiving the Texas Purple Heart Medal, the 3rd highest decoration awarded by the State of Texas.

== Commanders ==
Start date	End date	Commander
1946-07-02	1947-06-05	MG Richard B. Dunbar
1947-06-06	1958-10-31	MG Albert S. Johnson
1958-11-01	1959-10-13	MG Clayton P. Kerr
1959-10-14	1961-06-30	MG John L. Thompson Jr.
1961-07-01	1964-03-31	MG Harley B. West
1964-04-01	1967-05-31	MG Luther E. Orrick
1967-06-01	1968-01-14	MG James D. Scott
1973-11-01	1976-10-31	MG James L. Moreland
1976-11-01	1979-11-02	MG Delmer L. Nichols
1979-11-03	1982-10-31	MG John B. Garrett
1982-11-01	1984-11-01	MG Elmer L. Stephens
1984-11-02	1985-02-20	MG James T. Dennis
1985-02-21	1987-11-12	MG James B. McGoodwin
1987-11-13	1989-05-22	MG Charles H. Kone
1989-05-23	1992-08-23	MG Don O. Daniel
1992-08-24	1995-09-25	MG Wm. Edgar Murphy
1995-09-26	1998-09-30	MG Federico Lopez III
1998-09-30	2002-03-23	MG Robert L. Halverson
2002-03-23	2004-05-01	MG Michael Taylor

- division deactivated and replaced by the 36th Inf. Div.

=== Command Sergeants Major ===
- CSM David L Moore
- CSM Wilfred Martin
- CSM Jim Merritt
- CSM Mikeal Graham
- CSM Don Steelhammer
- CSM Donnie Strickland
- CSM Bobby Adams
- CSM Rodger W Brownlee - Last CSM 49AD - First CSM 36ID
- CSM Robert G. Shamy
