= 144th Infantry Regiment (United States) =

- Coat of arms
- Active: 1880–1919, 1921–1945, 1947–1968, 1973–present
- Country: United States
- Branch: Texas Army National Guard
- Type: Infantry
- Nicknames: Fourth Texas, Bayonet Battalion
- Motto: Par Oneri (Equal to the Task)
- Engagements: Border War (1910–19); World War I World War II; Iraq War

Commanders
- Current commander: LTC John Melendez
- Notable commanders: LTC Stan W. Poe; LTC Monie Ulis; LTC Greg M. Barrow; LTC Michael Houston; COL Irving J. Phillipson

Insignia
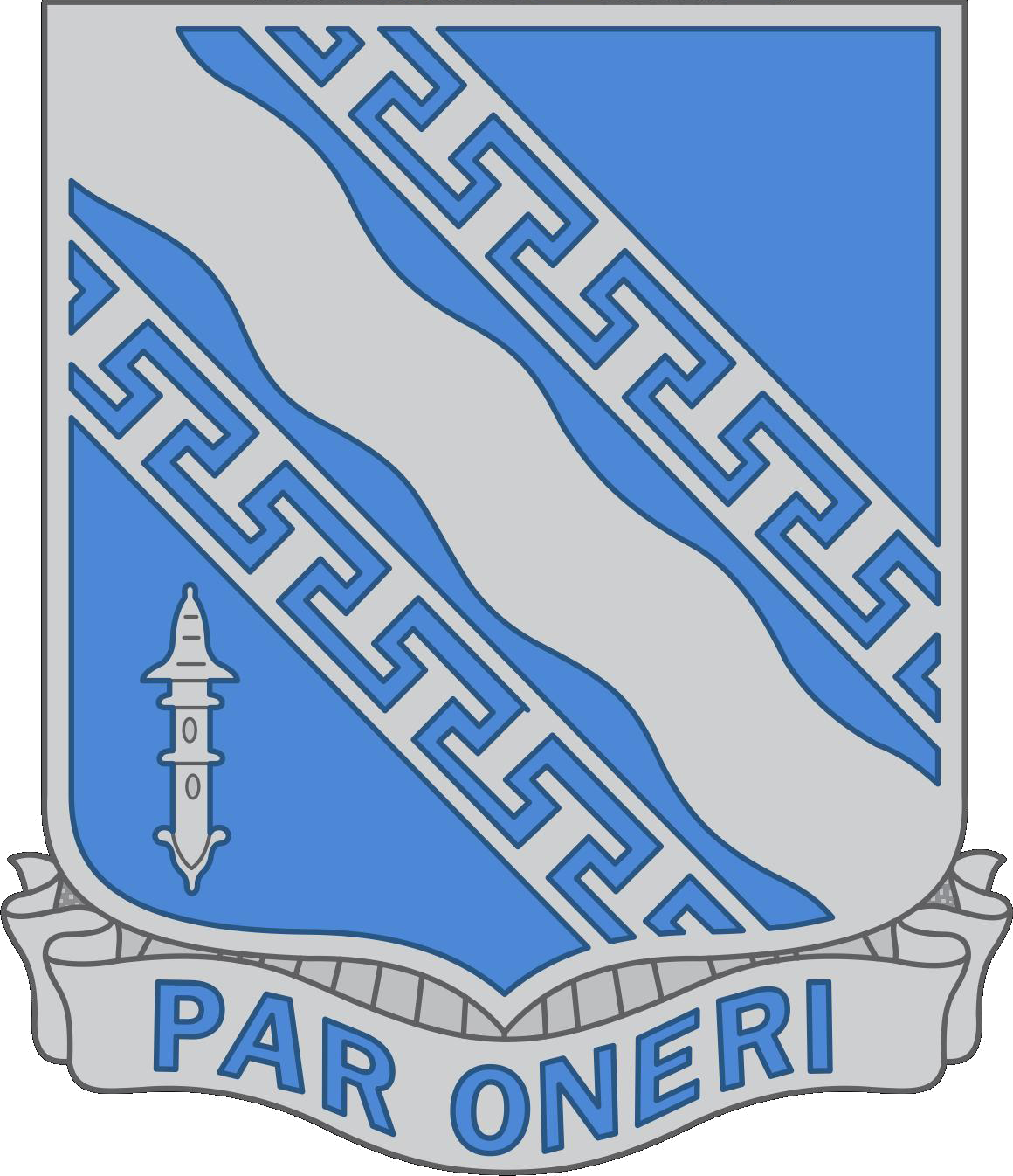
- Distinctive unit insignia

The 144th Infantry Regiment (4th Texas) is an infantry regiment of the United States Army, Texas Army National Guard. It was formed in 1880 and served in several American wars including the present war on terror. Currently, only the 3rd Battalion remains, and it is a part of the 56th Infantry Brigade Combat Team of the 36th Infantry Division.

== History ==
The 144th Infantry Regiment was created in April 1880, when six volunteer militia companies of the Texas State Guard consolidated into the 4th Texas Infantry. The six companies were the Lamar Rifles from Dallas, the Fannin Light Guards from Bonham, the Frontier Rifles from Henrietta, the Gate City Guard from Denison, the Johnson County Guard from Cleburne, and the Queen City Guards from Dallas. In 1898, the 4th Texas Volunteers were mustered for federal service in the Spanish–American War, and they were redesignated as the Second Infantry, Texas Volunteers, but they never deployed or saw combat. In 1903, the regiment regained its 4th Texas moniker after a state military force reorganization.

=== Border War ===
In 1916, the 4th Texas mobilized for service along the Mexico–United States border during the Border War, and they were responsible for the Big Bend region of Texas.

=== World War I ===
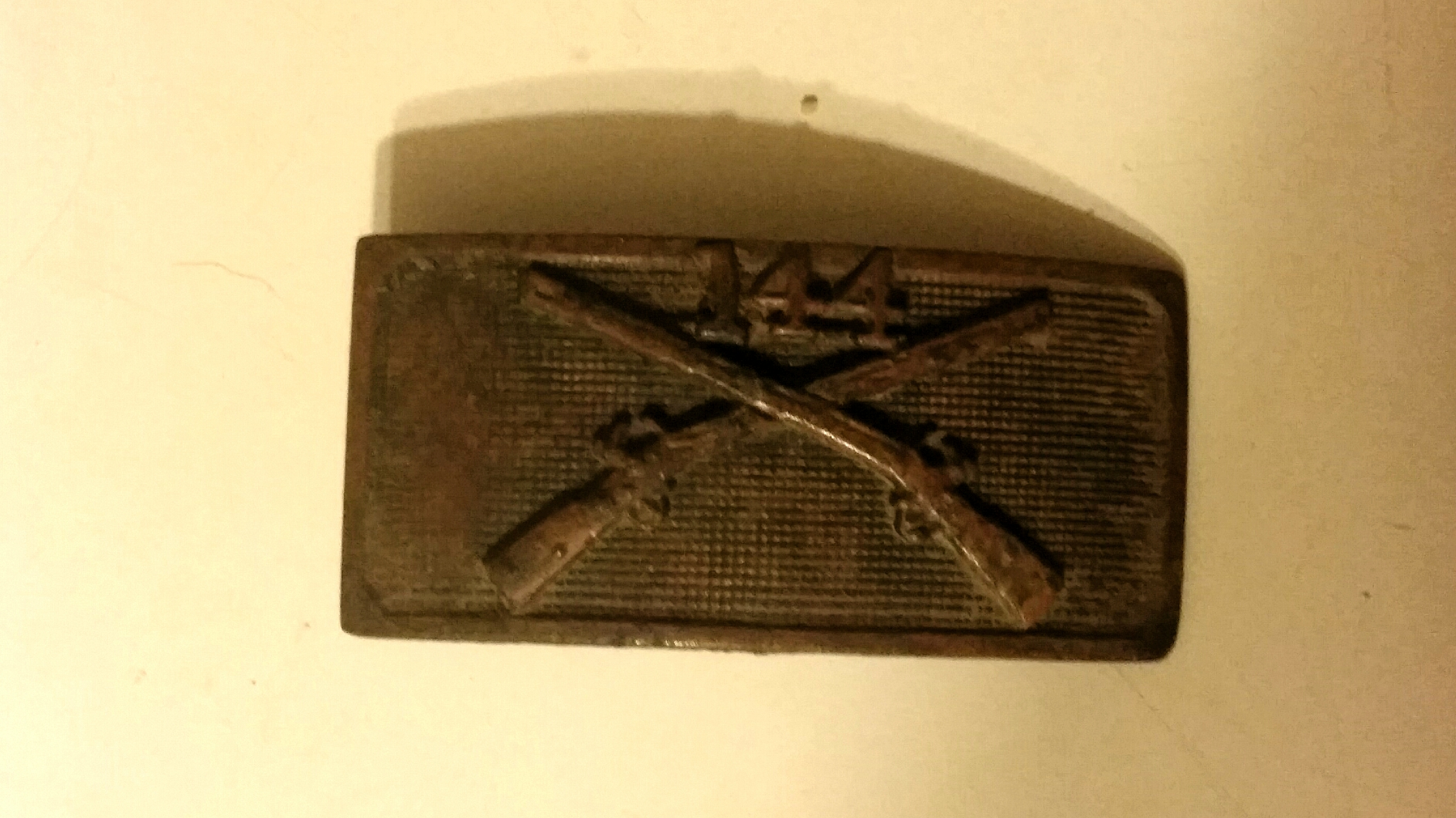
Belt Buckle from the 144th. Likely used during World War I. Buckle was discovered by a metal detectorist in Fort Worth, TX at the site of Camp Bowie

The regiment was recalled to federal service soon after, in March 1917, and was combined with elements of the 6th Texas Infantry at Camp Bowie to form the new 144th Infantry Regiment. They were going to fight in World War I. They were assigned to the 72nd Brigade of the 36th Infantry Division, alongside the 143rd Infantry Regiment. Arriving in France in July 1918, it trained in Bar-sur-Aube until September where they served as a reserve for the French Army.

On 9 October 1918, the 144th relieved elements of the 2nd Infantry Division during the Meuse-Argonne Offensive. By the time the Texans had reached the front, the Germans were engaging in a fighting retreat all along the front line. Enemy artillery, gas, and machine-gun, small arms fire hit the men of the regiment during their continuous advance, but they closed in on the Aisne River by 12 October. The next day, they swept south to clear out any stalwart defenders, and were moved off the line. They spent the rest of the war acting as a divisional reserve. They had lost 369 men in the Great War, the second largest toll of the infantry regiments in the division.

=== Interwar period ===
The 144th Infantry arrived at the port of New York on 5 June 1919 on the troopship USS Pretoria and was demobilized on 3 July 1919 at Camp Travis, near San Antonio, Texas. Per the National Defense Act of 1920, the 144th Infantry was reconstituted in the National Guard on 3 December 1920, assigned to the 36th Division, and allotted to Texas. It was reorganized and federally recognized on 19 May 1922 with the regimental headquarters at Fort Worth. The regimental headquarters was relocated on 16 March 1937 to Dallas. The regiment, or elements thereof, was called up to perform the following state duties: elements for riot control at Dallas, 21–24 May 1925; 1st Battalion and Company L for crowd control during the race riot at Sherman, Texas, 9–24 May 1930; elements for tornado relief duties at Oak Cliff, Texas, 30–31 July 1933; elements for the New London School explosion in March 1937; elements for firefighting and crowd control during oil field fires at Kilgore, Texas, in January 1938; elements for riot control during a workers’ strike on the Missouri–Kansas–Texas Railroad at Texarkana, Texas, in June 1939. Company E was awarded the national William Randolph Hearst Trophy for marksmanship in 1936. The 144th conducted annual summer training most years at Camp Mabry, Austin, Texas, 1922–25, and Camp Hulen, Palacios, Texas, 1926–39. The 144th Infantry was inducted into federal service at home stations on 25 November 1940 and moved to Camp Bowie, where it arrived on 7 January 1941.

=== World War II ===
The day after the attack on Pearl Harbor, 8 December 1941, the regiment moved to Fort Lewis, Washington to guard the West Coast against possible Japanese attack under the Western Defense Command. Because of the restructuring of the US Army, the 144th was removed from the 36th Infantry Division command on 1 February 1942 and assigned to GHQ as a separate regiment. The regiment moved to San Francisco, California, on 20 April 1942, and to Santa Rosa, California, on 7 May 1942 under the Western Defense Command. The regiment moved to Atlantic Beach, Florida 21 January 1943 for coastal patrol duty with the Eastern Defense Command, and then was assigned to Camp Van Dorn. Mississippi on 23 March 1944. The 144th was reassigned to the XXI Corps on 18 April 1944. From March 1944, the regiment provided an accelerated six-week course of infantry training (four weeks of familiarization, qualification, and transition firing, and two weeks of tactical training) to men who were formerly members of disbanded anti-aircraft and tank destroyer units or who had volunteered for transfer to the infantry from other branches of the Army, and men from the 144th served as replacements in 48 different Army divisions. The 144th moved to Camp Swift, Texas, on 5 January 1945, and then to Camp Rucker, Alabama, on 4 April 1945 under the Replacement and School Command, where it was deactivated on 19 September 1945.

=== After 1945 ===
When the 49th Armored Division was being created, the 144th Infantry was reactivated by battalion from April to November 1947. The 1st-4th Battalions were redesignated as Mechanized infantry in 1959. The 144th was later mobilized in response to the Berlin Crisis of 1961 and deployed to Fort Polk, Louisiana before returning home in May 1962. It was returned to state service in June. The regiment was briefly deactivated from 1968–1973, where it remained a component of the Texas National Guard.

=== Global war on terror ===
In 2006, as part of the 56th Infantry Brigade Combat Team, Company B of the 3d Battalion, 144th Infantry Regiment deployed to Iraq after pre-deployment training at Fort Dix, New Jersey and were actively engaged in combat operations. They returned in late 2007. Five Army Commendation Medals with Valor Devices were awarded to soldiers of 1st Platoon, Second Squad in recognition of the defeat of an ambush on a State Department convoy in central Baghdad. On 7 May 2007, 3rd Battalion, 144th Infantry Regiment mobilized as Task Force Panther in support of Operation Iraqi Freedom. Task Force Panther trained at Camp Shelby, Mississippi, and, after validation, deployed to Kuwait, and then into combat operations in Iraq. The 3rd Battalion, 144th Infantry deployed to Afghanistan in support of Operation Enduring Freedom in 2012 as Task Force Bowie.

In October 2017, the battalion deployed under Task Force Bayonet in support of Operation Enduring Freedom – Horn of Africa, with headquarters out of Camp Lemonnier, Djibouti. The Task Force’s organizational structure was 8 companies, to include one active duty company from the 10th Mountain Division, totaling nearly 1000 Soldiers. 3-144 Infantry redeployed to the United States in July 2018.

In 2016, the headquarters and headquarters company of the battalion were at Fort Worth, Company A at Greenville, Company B at Kilgore, Company C at Seagoville, and Company D at Palestine. By 2018 the battalion Headquarters and Headquarters Company had relocated to Wylie.
