= Luther Hotel =

Hotel in Palacios, Texas, US

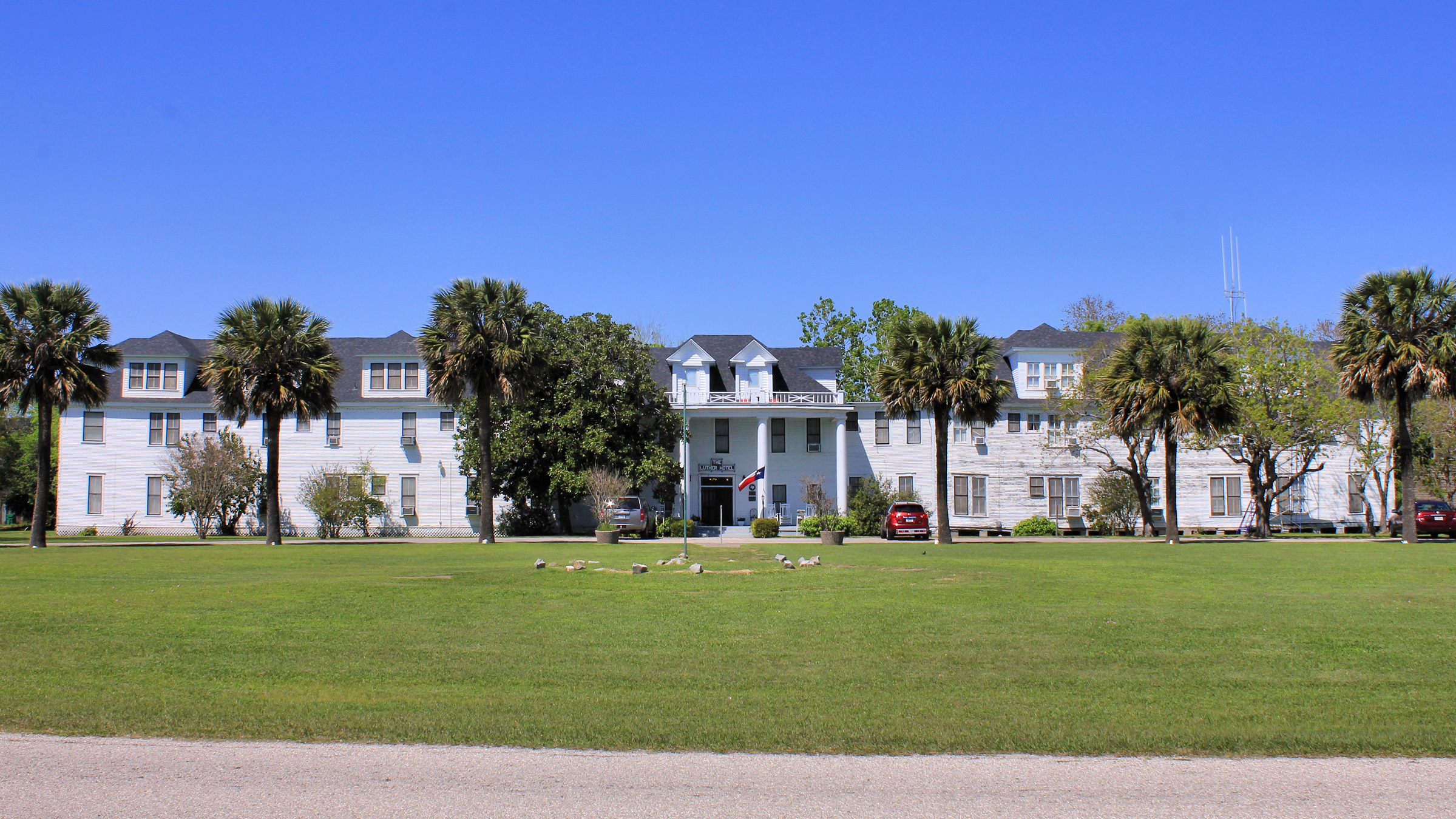
- Former names: The Bay View Hotel; The Hotel Palacios

General information
- Location: Palacios, Texas, United States
- Completed: 1903

The Luther Hotel is a hotel in Palacios, Texas. It was built in 1903.

== History ==
The hotel, originally named the Bay View Hotel, was built in 1903 by the Texas Rice Development Company to cater to rice farmers and ranchers.

In 1904, the hotel was moved "around the corner" to its present location. In the move, the original chimneys and porch were removed, and the east and west wings were added to the original central structure. A new 300-ft porch was also added to the building, dubbed the "longest front porch in Texas". The hotel was renamed the Hotel Palacios.

During World War I, the hotel hosted Red Cross volunteers several times a week, who would use the time and space to sew garments for American soldiers.

In 1936, a new owner, Charles Luther, bought the hotel and enclosed the porch to add more rooms.

The hotel was busiest during World War II. Notable visitors to the hotel during that time included Rita Hayworth and Shirley Temple. These celebrities, as well as visiting bands, would entertain troops at the nearby Camp Hulen. In 1944, the building's top two floors were damaged by a fire.

In 1961, the building was again damaged, this time by Hurricane Carla. The hotel was designated as a Recorded Texas Historic Landmark in 1965.

It was added to the National Register of Historic Places on May 10, 2010.

In the early 2020s, the hotel's owner died without a will, placing the hotel's status into limbo. A preservation group based in Palacios gathered 2,000 signatures from across the state and country in favor of preserving the building.
