= Palacios Municipal Airport =

Palacios Municipal Airport (former Palacios Army Airfield)
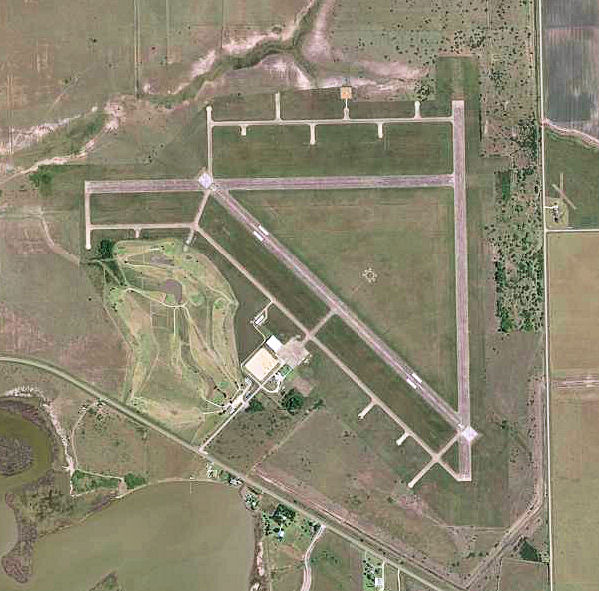
- USGS 2006 orthophoto
- IATA: PSX; ICAO: KPSX; FAA LID: PSX

Summary
- Airport type: Public
- Owner: City of Palacios
- Serves: Palacios, Texas
- Elevation AMSL: 14 ft / 4 m
- Coordinates: 28°43′39″N 096°15′03″W

Map
- Location of airport in Texas

Runways
Direction	Length		Surface
Direction	ft	m	Surface
8/26	5,001	1,524	Concrete
13/31	5,001	1,524	Concrete
17/35	5,001	1,524	Concrete

Statistics (2011)
- Aircraft operations: 2,960
- Based aircraft: 12
- Source: Federal Aviation Administration

Palacios Municipal Airport (IATA: PSX, ICAO: KPSX, FAA LID: PSX) is a city-owned, public-use airport located three nautical miles (6 km) northwest of the central business district of Palacios, a city in Matagorda County, Texas, United States. It is included in the National Plan of Integrated Airport Systems for 2011–2015, which categorized it as a general aviation facility.

== History ==
Camp Palacios was originally established as a summer training camp for the 36th Infantry Division of the TX National Guard after the Palacios Campsite Association donated the land to the state in 1926. As a result of World War II, Palacios Army Airfield was constructed in 1943 and opened in August by the United States Army Air Forces as a maintenance depot and supply facility for Air Technical Service Command. At the end of the war the airfield was determined to be excess by the military and turned over to the local government for civil use.

== Facilities and aircraft ==
Palacios Municipal Airport covers an area of 1,538 acres (622 ha) at an elevation of 14 feet (4 m) above mean sea level. It has three runways with concrete surfaces: 8/26 is 5,001 by 150 feet (1,524 x 46 m); 13/31 is 5,001 by 150 feet (1,524 x 46 m); 17/35 is 5,001 by 75 feet (1,524 x 23 m).

For the 12 months ending May 21, 2011, the airport had 2,960 aircraft operations, an average of 246 per month: 51% general aviation and 49% military. At that time there were 12 aircraft based at this airport: 75% single-engine and 25% helicopter.

== See also ==
- List of airports in Texas
- Texas World War II Army Airfields
