= Texas Cavalry Service Medal =

- Type: Military award
- Awarded for: Service
- Description: The ribbon drape is of yellow, green and white stripes. The medal consists of crossed swords over a white star within a gold circle. Upon the gold circle are the words "Texas Cavalry".
- Presented by: Texas Military Department
- Eligibility: Texas Army National Guard Cavalry personnel
- Campaigns: Texas Military Conflicts
- Status: Retired
- Established: June 17, 2005
- Service ribbon

Precedence
- Next (higher): Texas Combat Service Ribbon
- Next (lower): Texas Cold War Medal

The Texas Cavalry Service Medal is a campaign/service award of the Texas Military Department that was issued to service members of the 112th Cavalry or 124th Cavalry. There are no provisions for subsequent awards.

== Eligibility ==
The Texas Cavalry Service Medal is awarded to any service member of the 112th Cavalry 124th Cavalry who:

- Deployed overseas for a period of not less than 30 days of deployments
- Served in a hostile fire zone
- In support of Operation Iraqi Freedom or Operation Enduring Freedom
- From 11 September 2001 through 1 August 2009

Historical Note: The first 182 cavalry troopers eligible for the award completed their tour of duty in Iraq on February 11, 2005. Carrying the same unit heraldry as the 1st Squadron, 124th Cavalry Regiment, members of the Texas National Guard's Brigade Reconnaissance Troops mobilized for Operation Iraqi Freedom III were also eligible for this award.

== Authority ==
=== Issuing ===
No longer issued.

=== Legal ===
The Texas Cavalry Service Medal was established by the State Legislature on June 17, 2005. It was awarded to those who served in the 124th Cavalry Regiment on or after September 11, 2001 in a hostile fire zone as designated by the Secretary of Defense.

== See also ==
- Awards and decorations of the Texas Military
- Awards and decorations of the Texas government
- Texas Military Forces
- Texas Military Department
- List of conflicts involving the Texas Military
