= Nicholas Moran =

American military officer and historian

- Nickname: "The Chieftain"
- Born: 1975 (age 50–51); California, United States
- Branch: United States Army
- Service years: 2000–present
- Rank: Lieutenant colonel
- Commands: 1st Armored Division; Main Command Post: Operational Detachment; 1st Squadron 124th Cavalry Regiment current
- Awards: Bronze Star Medal; Meritorious Service Medal; Valorous Unit Award; Meritorious Unit Commendation
- Alma mater: University College Dublin

Nicholas Theodore Moran (born 1975) is an Irish American author, amateur historian, video game consultant, YouTuber and US Army National Guard officer.

== Early life and education ==
Moran's ancestry is Irish on his father's side and Greek on his mother's. He was born in California and attended University College Dublin from 1992 to 1996.

== Career ==
Moran joined the Irish Army Reserve in September 1997 and the US Army National Guard in November 2000. He was deployed to Iraq in 2004 and 2005 as a tank platoon leader (during which his unit received a Valorous Unit Award), and Afghanistan in 2009 and 2010 (during which his unit received a Meritorious Unit Commendation). He has been awarded both the Bronze Star with oak leaf cluster and Meritorious Service Medal for his service.

Since August 2011, Moran has been the Director of Militaria Relations for Wargaming America, described by him as a "liaison between the company and the wonderful world of the military."

Since September 2011, Moran has run the YouTube channel The Chieftain, which focuses on "long-form, in-depth videos, with a priority on getting inside vehicles to gain the 'human factors' evaluation of things from the end user's perspective as well as other materials sourced from archives."

Moran has advocated for the support of Ukraine in the Russo-Ukrainian War since February 2022.

Moran has previously been detachment commander of the 1st Armored Division Main Command Post – Operational Detachment.

In early 2025 he became commander of 1-124 Cavalry.

== Personal life ==
Moran holds US citizenship. He was previously a dual citizen of Ireland and the US, but renounced foreign citizenship in 2002 when he was commissioned as a United States Army officer.

== Works ==
- Moran, Nicholas (19 December 2017). Can Openers. Echo Point Books and Media. ISBN 9781635618594.
