= 56th Infantry Brigade Combat Team =

- Shoulder sleeve insignia
- Active: 2004-Present
- Country: United States
- Branch: United States Army National Guard
- Type: Infantry Brigade Combat Team
- Size: Brigade
- Garrison/HQ: Fort Worth

Insignia
- Distinctive Unit Insignia: 56th Infantry Brigade

Shoulder sleeve insignia of 36th Infantry Division, worn by soldiers of 56th Infantry Brigade Combat Team.

The 56th Infantry Brigade Combat Team is a brigade combat team unit of the Texas Army National Guard, part of the 36th Infantry Division.

== Early history ==
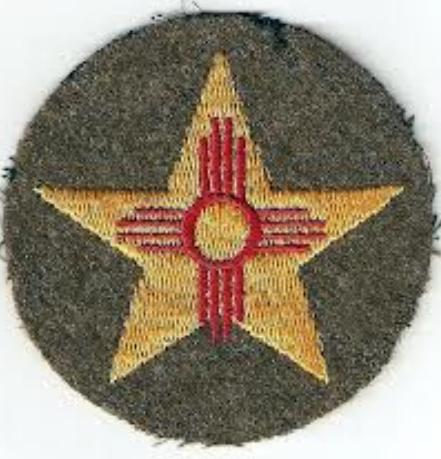
56th Cavalry Brigade shoulder sleeve insignia. Brigade included Texas units (lone star) and New Mexico units (red Zia sun).

At the start of World War I the War Department organized two National Guard Cavalry brigades as part of the Army's wartime expansion, and assigned them to relieve Regular Army Cavalry brigades patrolling the Mexico–United States border after the Pancho Villa Expedition. The unit allocated to Texas was fielded as 1st Texas Cavalry Brigade, and commanded by Brigadier General Jacob F. Wolters. The War Department planned to mobilize the brigade for overseas service, but the war ended before training was complete, and soldiers were demobilized in late 1918 and early 1919. The brigade was reorganized as 1st Cavalry Brigade on 23 August 1919, and General Wolters remained in command. The task organization for the brigade also included the 111th Cavalry Regiment in New Mexico.

== Post-World War I ==
In 1921, the 1st Cavalry Brigade was renamed the 56th Cavalry Brigade and assigned to the 23rd Cavalry Division as part of the Army's post-World War I reorganization of the National Guard.

Soldiers of the 56th Cavalry were called out several times to quell civil disturbances, including: the Longview Race Riot of 1919; the Galveston Longshoreman's Strike of 1920; the Mexia and Borger Oil Field Booms of 1922 and 1929; the booms in the East Texas oil fields in 1931 and 1932; and the response following a hurricane in 1932. Wolters commanded troops on state active duty so often that he published a manual on use of the National Guard in reestablishing law and order following riots and natural disasters.

In 1929, the 111th Cavalry Regiment was made a separate organization, and the newly organized 124th Cavalry Regiment was added to the 56th Cavalry Brigade, making it a completely Texas National Guard organization.

== World War II ==
In 1940, the 56th Cavalry Brigade headquarters was federalized for World War II. The 56th was the last cavalry brigade in the United States to have horses, and in 1944 the headquarters was reorganized as the 56th Cavalry Reconnaissance Troop (Mechanized). The new unit was demobilized in November, 1945, following the end of World War II. The brigade headquarters and re-organized reconnaissance troop did not deploy overseas or see combat, but the 112th and 124th Cavalry, the regiments previously assigned to the 56th Cavalry Brigade, did serve overseas.

== Post-World War II ==
The post-World War II reorganization of the National Guard included the creation of several armored divisions, among them the 49th Armored Division in Texas. The 56th Cavalry Reconnaissance Troop was reorganized as Headquarters, and Headquarters Company, Combat Command A, 49th Armored Division and stationed in Fort Worth.

In October 1961, the unit was federalized for during the Berlin crisis and trained at Fort Polk and other locations before being demobilized.

The headquarters of Combat Command A was reorganized in 1963 and the new unit was designated Headquarters and Headquarters Company, 2nd Brigade, 49th Armored Division.

In 1968, the 2nd Brigade's headquarters was re-designated as Headquarters, 49th Armor Group when the 49th Armored Division was broken up. The group controlled the 2nd and 3rd Battalions of the 112th Armor. In 1971 another reorganization resulted in the renaming of the 49th Armor Group's headquarters as Headquarters, 49th Armored Brigade.

When the 49th Armored Division was reformed in a 1973 reorganization, the brigade headquarters became that of the 2nd Brigade, 49th Armored Division.

== Recent history ==
Following the terrorist attacks of September 11, 2001, 56th IBCT soldiers and units performed extended active duty for Operations Noble Eagle, Enduring Freedom, Iraqi Freedom and New Dawn.

The 49th Armored Division was inactivated in 2004, effectively renamed the 36th Infantry Division. 2nd Brigade, 49th Armored Division was reorganized and renamed 56th Infantry Brigade, 36th Infantry Division.

The 56th Infantry Brigade Combat Team deployed to Iraq in 2005 and performed convoy command and control and convoy security duty as part of Multi-National Corps – Iraq.

In 2008 and 2009, the 56th IBCT returned to Iraq and performed convoy and base security force duties.

3rd Battalion, 144th Infantry deployed to Afghanistan in 2012. The battalion was deployed to Camp Lemonnier for Operation Enduring Freedom – Horn of Africa in 2017.

== Organization 2025 ==
- 56th Infantry Brigade Combat Team, in Fort Worth
  - Headquarters and Headquarters Company, 56th Infantry Brigade Combat Team, in Fort Worth
  - 1st Squadron, 124th Cavalry Regiment, in Waco
    - Headquarters and Headquarters Troop, 1st Squadron, 124th Cavalry Regiment, in Waco
    - Troop A, 1st Squadron, 124th Cavalry Regiment, in Waco
    - Troop B, 1st Squadron, 124th Cavalry Regiment, in Waco
    - Troop C (Dismounted), 1st Squadron, 124th Cavalry Regiment, in Grand Prairie
  - 2nd Battalion, 142nd Infantry Regiment, in Lubbock
    - Headquarters and Headquarters Company, 2nd Battalion, 142nd Infantry Regiment, in Lubbock
    - Company A, 2nd Battalion, 142nd Infantry Regiment, in Amarillo
    - Company B, 2nd Battalion, 142nd Infantry Regiment, in Denison
    - Company C, 2nd Battalion, 142nd Infantry Regiment, at Midland Airport
    - Company D (Weapons), 2nd Battalion, 142nd Infantry Regiment, in Wichita Falls
  - 1st Battalion, 143rd Infantry Regiment (Airborne), in White Settlement
    - Headquarters and Headquarters Company, 1st Battalion, 143rd Infantry Regiment (Airborne), in White Settlement
    - Company A, 1st Battalion, 143rd Infantry Regiment (Airborne), in Huntsville
    - Company B, 1st Battalion, 143rd Infantry Regiment (Airborne), in Seagoville
    - Company C, 1st Battalion, 143rd Infantry Regiment (Airborne), in East Greenwich (RI) — (Rhode Island Army National Guard)
    - Company D (Weapons), 1st Battalion, 143rd Infantry Regiment (Airborne), in Seagoville
    - 143rd Forward Support Company, in White Settlement
  - 3rd Battalion, 144th Infantry Regiment, in Wylie
    - Headquarters and Headquarters Company, 3rd Battalion, 144th Infantry Regiment, in Wylie
    - Company A, 3rd Battalion, 144th Infantry Regiment, in Greenville
    - Company B, 3rd Battalion, 144th Infantry Regiment, at Kilgore
    - Company C, 3rd Battalion, 144th Infantry Regiment, in Seagoville
    - Company D (Weapons), 3rd Battalion, 144th Infantry Regiment, in Palestine
  - 3rd Battalion, 133rd Field Artillery Regiment, at Fort Bliss
    - Headquarters and Headquarters Battery, 3rd Battalion, 133rd Field Artillery Regiment, at Fort Bliss
    - Battery A, 3rd Battalion, 133rd Field Artillery Regiment, at Fort Bliss
    - Battery B, 3rd Battalion, 133rd Field Artillery Regiment, at Fort Bliss
    - Battery C, 3rd Battalion, 133rd Field Artillery Regiment, at Fort Bliss
  - 156th Brigade Engineer Battalion, in Grand Prairie
    - Headquarters and Headquarters Company, 156th Brigade Engineer Battalion, in Grand Prairie
    - Company A (Combat Engineer), 156th Brigade Engineer Battalion, in Lewisville
    - Company B (Combat Engineer), 156th Brigade Engineer Battalion, in Decatur
    - Company C (Signal), 156th Brigade Engineer Battalion, in Grand Prairie
    - Company D (Military Intelligence), 156th Brigade Engineer Battalion, in Grand Prairie
      - Detachment 1, Company D (Military Intelligence), 156th Brigade Engineer Battalion, at Fort Hood (RQ-28A UAV)
  - 949th Brigade Support Battalion, in Fort Worth
    - Headquarters and Headquarters Company, 949th Brigade Support Battalion, in Fort Worth
    - Company A (Distribution), 949th Brigade Support Battalion, in Fort Worth
    - Company B (Maintenance), 949th Brigade Support Battalion, at Fort Worth
    - Company C (Medical), 949th Brigade Support Battalion, in Grand Prairie
    - Company D (Forward Support), 949th Brigade Support Battalion, in Waco — attached to 1st Squadron, 124th Cavalry Regiment
    - Company E (Forward Support), 949th Brigade Support Battalion, in Denton — attached to 156th Brigade Engineer Battalion
    - Company F (Forward Support), 949th Brigade Support Battalion, at Fort Bliss — attached to 3rd Battalion, 133rd Field Artillery Regiment
    - Company G (Forward Support), 949th Brigade Support Battalion, in Lubbock — attached to 2nd Battalion, 142nd Infantry Regiment
    - Company H (Forward Support), 949th Brigade Support Battalion, in Wylie — attached to 3rd Battalion, 144th Infantry Regiment
