= 124th Cavalry Regiment =

- Coat of Arms of the 124th Cavalry
- Active: 1929–present
- Country: United States
- Branch: United States Army
- Type: Reconnaissance (Parent Regiment under United States Army Regimental System)
- Part of: 56th Infantry Brigade Combat Team (1st Squadron)
- Garrison/HQ: Waco, Texas (1st Squadron)
- Nickname: "Mars Men" (Special Designation)
- Motto: "Golpeo Rapidamente" (I Strike Quickly)
- Engagements: World War II; Burma campaign (1944); Iraq War; Second Battle of Fallujah; Operation Enduring Freedom - Horn of Africa; Sinai insurgency

Commanders
- Notable commanders: Nicholas Moran ( Current 1st Squadron Commander )

Insignia
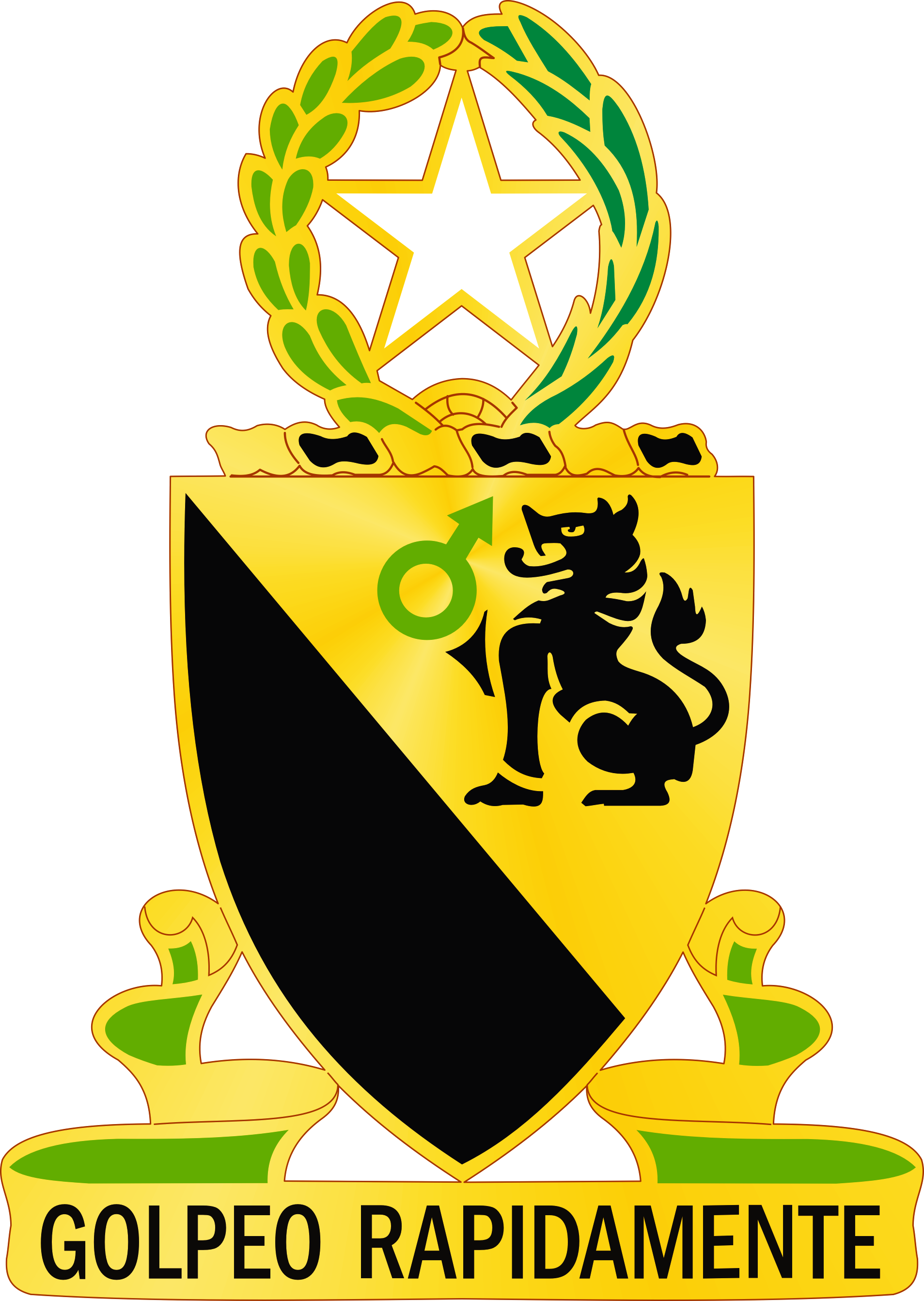
- Distinctive Unit Insignia

The 124th Cavalry Regiment (nicknamed "Mars Men") is a United States Army cavalry regiment, represented in the Texas Army National Guard by 1st Squadron, 124th Cavalry, part of the 56th Infantry Brigade Combat Team at Waco.

The 124th was originally constituted and organized in 1929 in the Texas National Guard. It was Federalized in 1940 but remained stateside, patrolling the Mexico–United States border, after the Attack on Pearl Harbor resulted in the United States entry into World War II. In 1944 it moved to Fort Riley, the last horse cavalry regiment in the army. The regiment was sent to India, where it arrived in August. After being redesignated as the 124th Cavalry, Special, it joined the Mars Task Force. Operating alongside Chinese troops, the 124th Cavalry and the task force recaptured the Burma Road from the Japanese in early 1945. The regiment was then sent to China to train Chinese troops, and was inactivated there in mid-1945.

The regiment was broken up in 1946 but became the 124th Armor in 1959. In 1963 it was redesignated the 124th Cavalry again.

== Interwar period ==
The 124th was constituted on 13 February 1929 in the Texas National Guard and organized on 15 March 1929 from new and existing units. It initially consisted of two cavalry squadrons, each with two troops, and headquarters and support units. Its headquarters was organized at San Antonio. The regimental band was redesignated from the Band Section of the 112th Cavalry's Service Troop at Mineral Wells. Its Machine Gun Troop was redesignated from Troop B, 56th Machine Gun Squadron, Cavalry at San Antonio. The Medical Department Detachment was redesignated at Houston from the Medical Department Detachment of the 56th Machine Gun Squadron.

Headquarters and Troops A and B of 1st Squadron were organized at Fort Worth. Troops A and B were redesignated from Troops E and G of the 112th Cavalry, respectively. 2nd Squadron headquarters was organized at Houston, while Troops E and F were organized at Brenham and Mineral Wells, respectively. Troop E was redesignated from Troop A of the 56th Machine Gun Squadron, while Troop F was redesignated from the 112th Cavalry's Service Troop. On 20 March, the regiment's Headquarters Troop was organized at Austin, completing the initial organization of the 124th.

The regiment was part of the 23rd Cavalry Division's 56th Cavalry Brigade, and was commanded by Colonel Louis S. Davidson, the former executive officer of the 56th Brigade. Each summer from 1929 to 1939, the 124th conducted training at Camp Wolters. The regiment's designated mobilization training station was Fort Bliss. Between September and October 1929, the regiment was called up for state duty to enforce martial law during the breaking up of the organized crime organization in Borger. In May 1930, it was called up to restore order after the Sherman race riot. Between September 1931 and December 1932, the regiment was called up to enforce order and prevent illegal oil production in the East Texas Oil Field. On 29 November 1934, regimental executive officer Colonel Calvin B. Garwood took command of the regiment after Davidson was promoted to command the 56th Brigade. Between 1935 and 1939, the 124th was awarded the National Guard Association's Pershing Trophy for cavalry marksmanship.

The 56th Brigade became an independent unit after leaving the 23rd Division on 1 April 1939. On 30 June, Troops I and K of the new 3rd Squadron were organized at Corpus Christi and Seguin, respectively. 3rd Squadron's headquarters was organized at Houston almost a month later, on 23 July. Between 3 and 23 August, the regiment participated in the Third Army maneuvers in the Kisatchie National Forest in Louisiana, involving 70,000 troops. On 1 October 1940, 3rd Squadron headquarters was inactivated and Troops I and K became Troops C and G of the 1st and 2nd Squadrons, respectively.

The 124th was called up for Federal service on 18 November at San Antonio. It was transferred to Fort Bliss, where it arrived on 28 November. The 56th Brigade became part of the Third Army upon Federalization. Headquarters and 1st Squadron transferred to Fort Brown on 5 February 1941, while 2nd Squadron simultaneously transferred to Fort Ringgold. The regiment relieved the 12th Cavalry of the Fort Brown Command sector of the Mexican Border Patrol. The 124th conducted border patrol duty along the Mexico–United States border from Brownsville to Laredo. On 29 May, the regiment returned to Fort Bliss. Between 12 August and 2 October, it participated in the massive Second Army–Third Army maneuver in the Louisiana Maneuver Area, which involved 342,000 troops. On 4 October, after the maneuvers ended, the regiment returned to Fort Brown.

== World War II ==
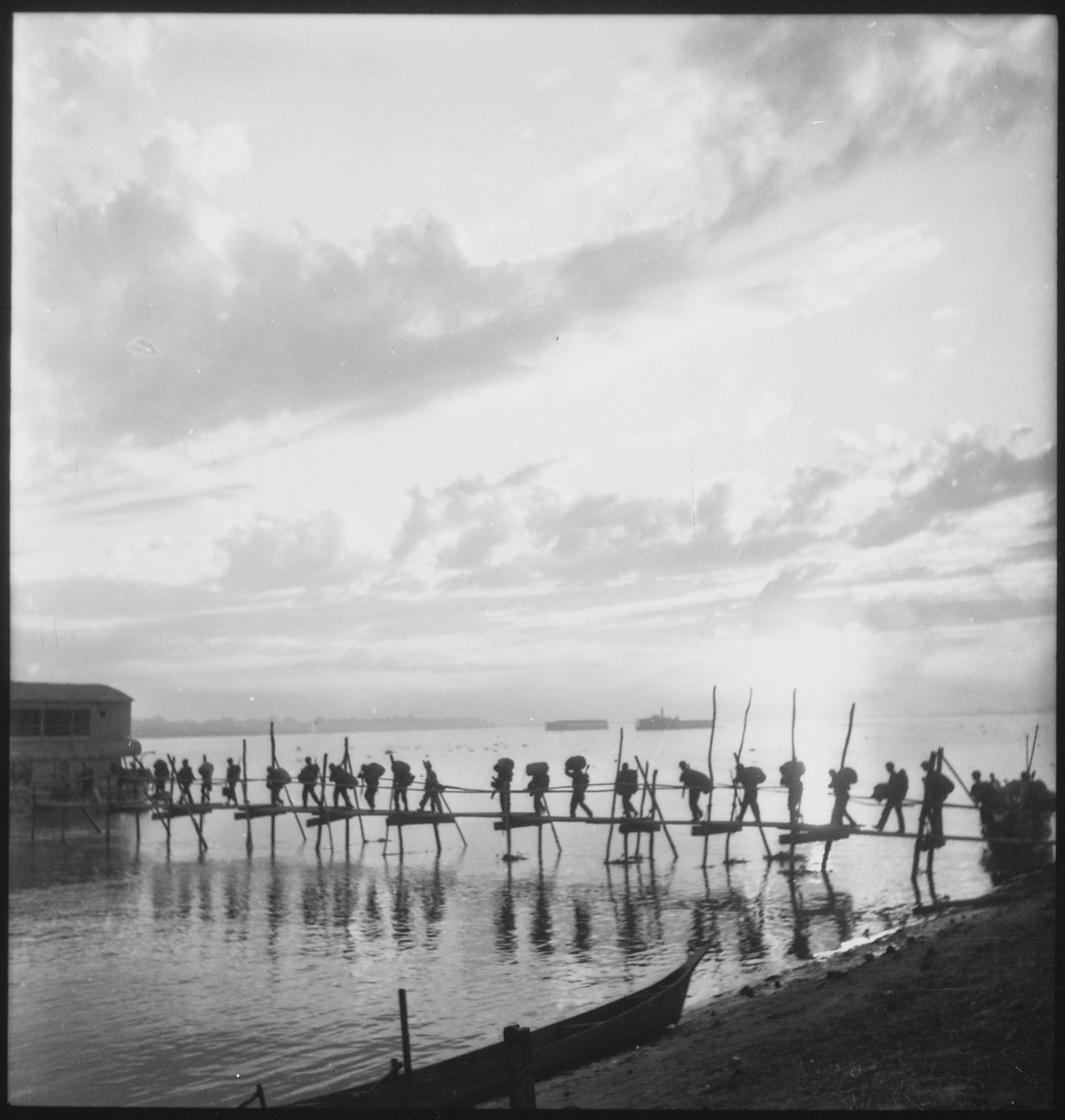
124th Cavalry troops moving from Ramgarh to Myitkyina, 25 October 1944

On 5 June 1942, Colonel John H. Irving became regimental commander. Between 4 November and 22 December 1943, the regiment was stationed at Fort D. A. Russell. At the beginning of May 1944, Irving was replaced for health reasons by Colonel Milo H. Matteson. The 124th Cavalry remained on the Mexican border with the 56th Brigade until 12 May 1944, when they were moved to Fort Riley, the last horse cavalry regiment in the army. At Fort Riley, the regiment became part of Fourth Army. After turning in its horses, the regiment left Fort Riley on 10 July, staging through Camp Anza to the Los Angeles Port of Embarkation, from which it departed aboard the transport USS General Henry W. Butner for Bombay, India on 25 July. After arriving in India with 78 officers and 1,522 enlisted men on 26 August, the regiment was transported by rail to Ramgarh Training Center, where it conducted infantry, jungle, patrol, and long range penetration training. It was reorganized as the 124th Cavalry, Special on 20 September after being officially dismounted. Five days later, the 3rd Squadron was activated in India from other regimental personnel after being reconstituted on 20 September. The regiment became part of the newly activated 5332nd Brigade (Provisional), which became the Mars Task Force. As well as the 124th, the task force also included the 475th Infantry Regiment, the survivors of Merrill's Marauders, brought up to strength by replacements from the United States, and the elite American-trained and equipped 1st Chinese Regiment (Separate).

In October, the regiment was flown to Myitkyina, entering combat with the task force. The regiment moved into the mountains of northern Burma on 15 December, and in subsequent months fought in numerous pitched battles with Japanese troops in and around the Burma Road. The 124th conducted long range operations deep behind Japanese lines, and used pack mules and aerial resupply. The 124th built roadblocks along the Burma Road during the campaign to wrest the road from Japanese control below Nankam. To block the road at Nampakka, it moved over 300 miles in Japanese-held territory, relying only on aerial resupply. On 15 January 1945, the regiment met in battle with Japanese forces. Troop F commander 1st Lieutenant Jack L. Knight was posthumously awarded the Medal of Honor for his actions on 2 February 1945 near Loi Kang, in which he singlehandedly knocked out two Japanese pill boxes and continued the attack despite having been blinded by a Japanese grenade. Knight was the only Army Ground Forces recipient of the Medal of Honor in the China-Burma-India Theatre of the war. The regiment subsequently moved south along the Burma Road, reaching Lashio by 23 March. Between 26 April and 14 May, the regiment was flown over The Hump to Kunming in China. There, its troops trained Chinese troops in the Chinese Combat Command. On 1 July 1945, the regiment was inactivated at Kunming.

== Cold War ==
The 124th was broken up on 2 July 1946, with its headquarters and headquarters troop becoming the headquarters and headquarters company of the 49th Armored Division's Reserve Command. The 1st, 2nd, and 3rd Squadrons became the 124th Mechanized Cavalry Reconnaissance Squadron, the 147th Tank Battalion, and the 49th Mechanized Cavalry Reconnaissance Squadron, respectively. The 49th Squadron was organized at Fort Worth on 1 March 1946 and was redesignated as the 49th Reconnaissance Battalion on 1 March 1949. The 124th Squadron was organized at Pecos on 14 March 1947 and was redesignated as the 112th Armored Cavalry's 2nd Battalion on 15 September 1949. Both squadrons were part of the 49th Armored Division.

On 16 March 1959, the 2nd Battalion of the 112th, the 49th Reconnaissance Battalion, and the 136th Tank Battalion (the former 636th Tank Destroyer Battalion) were consolidated as the 124th Armor, a Combat Arms Regimental System (CARS) parent regiment. The new parent unit consisted of the 1st Reconnaissance Squadron and the 2nd Medium Tank Battalion, both part of the 36th Infantry Division. On 15 March 1963, the 124th Armor was reorganized and redesignated as the 124th Cavalry, also a CARS parent regiment. The unit included the 1st Squadron, part of the 36th Division, and the 2nd Squadron, part of the 49th Armored Division. On 15 January 1968, the 124th was reorganized to consist of Troop A, part of the 71st Airborne Brigade; Troop E, part of the 36th Infantry Brigade; and Troop F, part of the 72nd Infantry Brigade. On 1 November 1973, the regiment was reorganized to consist of the 1st Squadron, part of the 49th Armored Division. It was withdrawn from CARS on 4 March 1987 and reorganized under the United States Army Regimental System with headquarters at Waco.

== War on Terror ==
On 1 September 2001, three Brigade Reconnaissance Troops — Troops G, H and I (BRT) — were activated under the 124th Cavalry Regiment in Houston, Dallas and Fort Worth. Each BRT was respectively assigned to the three brigades comprising the 49th Armored Division.

The 1st Squadron was mobilized in early 2004 to deploy to Iraq to participate in Operation Iraqi Freedom, and received two months military police training at Fort Dix before deploying. It deployed in March, attached to the 89th Military Police Brigade in Diyala Province near the Iranian border northeast of Baghdad. In Iraq, the squadron was responsible for providing convoy and area security and force protection operations. On 1 May, the 49th Armored was reflagged as the 36th Infantry Division. In November, a team of soldiers operating the Recon Optical RAVEN R-400 RWS system were sent to support US forces during the Second Battle of Fallujah, as well as other teams providing transport for fireteams and supply support, encountering combat on a daily basis. The 124th also provided security for the early 2005 Iraqi elections. The squadron returned from the deployment by February 2005, without suffering casualties.

15 August 2008 the 1st Squadron was activated to provide stability and support operations in Baghdad, with the Alpha Troop assigned to base security to the victory base complex, Bravo Troop assigned to security in the "green zone" and Charlie Troop assigned to the Joint visitors bureau. SGT Christopher Loza was the squadron's only casualty during this deployment.

On 1 April 2011, Task Force Raptor was established by reinforcing the 3rd Squadron with the 702nd and 712th Military Police Companies. It conducted pre-deployment training at Camp Swift and Camp Atterbury. In February 2012, the 3rd Squadron, as part of Task Force Raptor, took over the Combined Joint Task Force – Horn of Africa security role at Camp Lemonnier, Djibouti, from the 1st Battalion, 161st Field Artillery.

As of 2017, Headquarters and Troops A and B are based in Waco, and Troop C in Grand Prairie. On 8 July 2017, 3rd Squadron was inactivated at Wylie as part of National Guard restructuring. It was part of the 71st Expeditionary Military Intelligence Brigade (formerly the 71st Battlefield Surveillance Brigade).

In late August and early September 2017, 1st Squadron participated in Hurricane Harvey relief efforts along with other Texas National Guard units.

In January 2018, 1-124 Cavalry deployed to the Sinai Peninsula in Egypt as multinational force and observers (MFO), tasked with ensuring peace between Israel and Egypt in accordance with the 1979 treaty between the two nations. The squadron redeployed to the United States in October 2018 after a nine-month tour.
