= Palacios, Texas =

- City
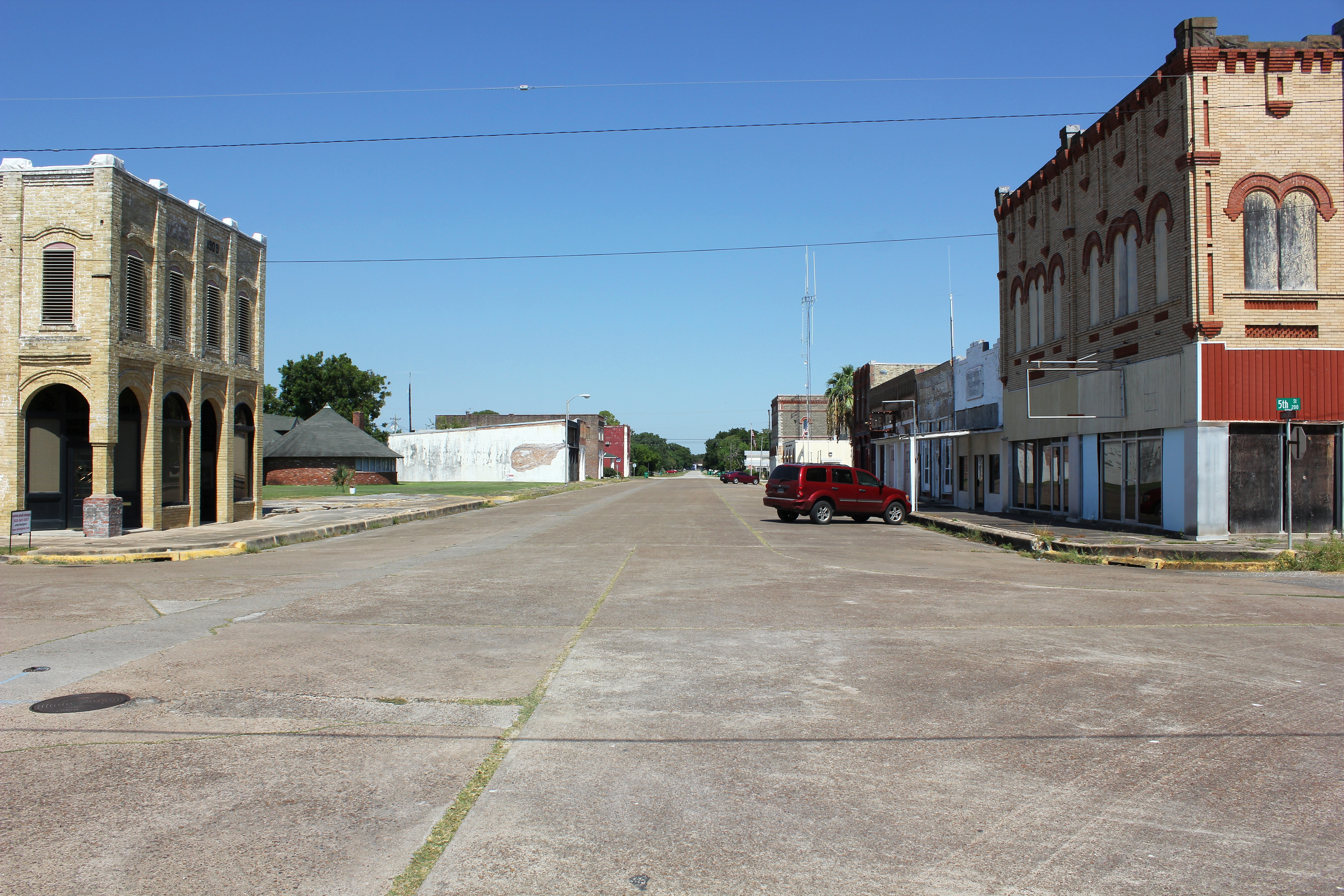
- Downtown Palacios
- Nickname: City by the Sea
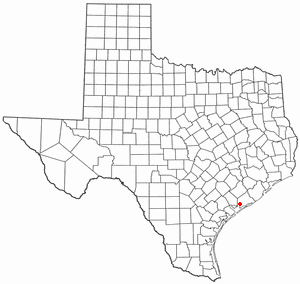
- Location of Palacios, Texas

- Coordinates: 28°42′33″N 96°14′03″W
- Country: United States
- State: Texas
- County: Matagorda

Area
  - Total: 5.20 sq mi (13.48 km^{2})
  - Land: 4.94 sq mi (12.79 km^{2})
  - Water: 0.27 sq mi (0.69 km^{2})
- Elevation: 7 ft (2.1 m)

Population (2020)
  - Total: 4,395
  - Density: 918.0/sq mi (354.45/km^{2})
- Time zone: UTC-6 (Central (CST))
  - Summer (DST): UTC-5 (CDT)
- ZIP code: 77465
- Area code: 361
- FIPS code: 48-54684
- GNIS feature ID: 2411354
- Website: www.cityofpalacios.org//

Palacios (/pəˈlæʃəs/ pə-LASH-əs) is a city in Matagorda County, Texas, United States. The population was 4,395 at the 2020 census.

== History ==
The native inhabitants of the region were the Karankawa people, whose initial contact with Europeans came in the 16th century when Spanish expeditions first traversed their territory.

In 1685, the area was explored by René-Robert Cavelier, Sieur de La Salle, the leader of an ill-fated French settlement attempt whose flagship La Belle was wrecked in the bay the following year. In the 1820s, English-speaking settlers arrived and came into frequent conflict with the Karankawa, who were eventually driven out of the area.

Popular local legend states that the area was named Tres Palacios ("Three Palaces") several centuries ago by shipwrecked Spanish sailors who claimed they saw a vision of three palaces on the bay. Historians believe it was more likely named for José Félix Trespalacios, an early Mexican governor of Texas. The town was originally called Trespalacios, but shortened its name due to a nearby post office already using the longer version.

The future site of Palacios was ranch land until 1901, when it was put up for sale by the estate of the former owner, Abel "Shanghai" Pierce. The land was purchased by a development company, surveyed into lots, and with the arrival of the Southern Pacific Railroad and the establishment of the Texas Baptist Encampment, it rapidly grew into a seaside resort town. It was first settled as a community in 1903. City government was established in 1909, and by 1915, Palacios was home to more than 100 businesses, with a post office, library, weekly newspaper, numerous hotels, including the imposing 1903 Luther Hotel along the waterfront, and churches, as well as a large entertainment pavilion built on a pier in the bay.

In 1926, Camp Hulen (originally "Camp Palacios") was opened as a training center for the 36th Infantry of the Texas National Guard. The camp was leased by the War Department during World War II, when it was developed into a major antiaircraft training facility with a peak troop capacity of 14,560, and also served as a detention center for German prisoners of war. The population of Palacios boomed during this period, and the city hosted visiting stars such as Rita Hayworth and Glenn Miller.

After the war, Camp Hulen was closed and the local population declined. The town was hit by Hurricane Carla in 1961, causing major damage. Since then, the population has grown again, with the settlement of Vietnamese immigrants and other newcomers from all over the United States. In 1973, acknowledging the rash of UFO sightings in the area and the state, then Mayor W.C. "Bill" Jackson declared October 24 Palacios' "First Annual UFO Fly-In Day" and called on President Richard Nixon to declare the community the "Interplanetary Capital of the Universe." In 1991, a pavilion was rebuilt on the waterfront, and in 1995 the French shipwreck La Belle was discovered at the bottom of the bay, becoming the focus of a major archeological excavation which was staged out of Palacios in 1996-1997. In 2009, the city marked its centennial with celebrations and other events.

== Geography ==
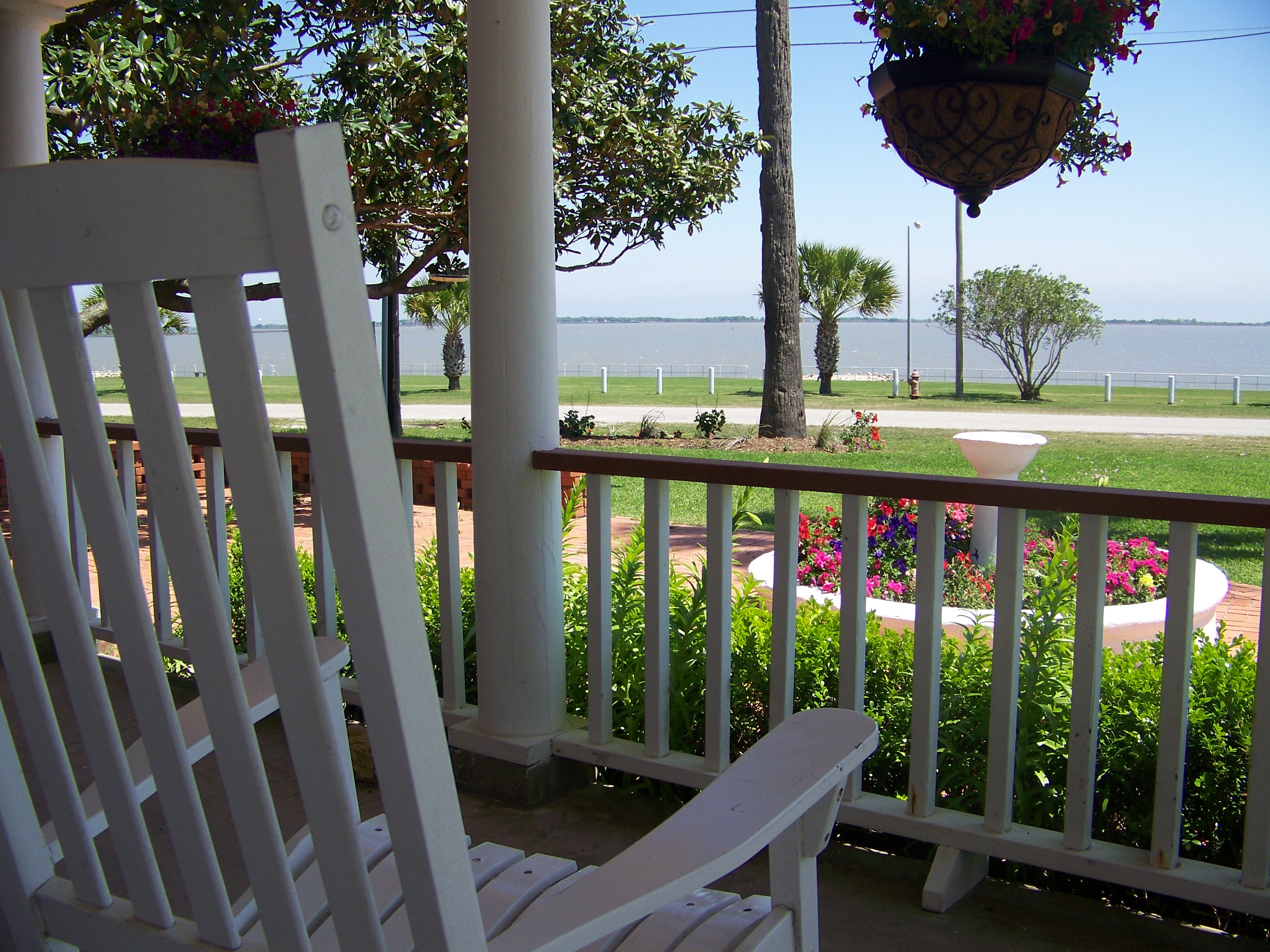
Tres Palacios Bay

Palacios is located on the Gulf Coast about halfway between Houston and Corpus Christi. It is connected to both cities by State Highway 35.

According to the United States Census Bureau, the city has a total area of 5.3 square miles (14 km^{2}), of which 5.0 square miles (13 km^{2}) is land and 0.2 square miles (0.52 km^{2}) (4.36%) is covered by water. It is located on the shores of Tres Palacios Bay, an arm of Matagorda Bay.

The Palacios area is known among birders for its wide diversity of bird life. Since 1997, as part of the 15-mile-diameter Matagorda County-Mad Island Marsh count circle of the National Audubon Society Christmas Bird Count, it has consistently reported more bird species than anywhere else in the United States. On December 19, 2005, a record 250 species were observed.

=== Climate ===
Palacios experiences a humid subtropical climate. Average daytime high temperatures range from 62 °F (17 °C) in January to 90 °F (32 °C) in August. Average nighttime lows range from 44 °F (7 °C) in winter to 77 °F (25 °C) in summer.

Climate data for Palacios Municipal Airport, Texas (1991–2020 normals, extremes 1943–present)
Month	Jan	Feb	Mar	Apr	May	Jun	Jul	Aug	Sep	Oct	Nov	Dec	Year
Record high °F (°C)	82 (28)	88 (31)	89 (32)	96 (36)	98 (37)	104 (40)	101 (38)	102 (39)	107 (42)	95 (35)	92 (33)	84 (29)	107 (42)
Mean maximum °F (°C)	76.9 (24.9)	78.8 (26.0)	82.3 (27.9)	86.8 (30.4)	89.8 (32.1)	93.9 (34.4)	94.6 (34.8)	96.6 (35.9)	94.9 (34.9)	90.4 (32.4)	83.7 (28.7)	79.2 (26.2)	98.0 (36.7)
Mean daily maximum °F (°C)	65.2 (18.4)	68.3 (20.2)	73.4 (23.0)	79.5 (26.4)	84.9 (29.4)	90.1 (32.3)	91.7 (33.2)	92.8 (33.8)	90.0 (32.2)	83.7 (28.7)	74.4 (23.6)	67.8 (19.9)	80.1 (26.7)
Daily mean °F (°C)	55.6 (13.1)	59.3 (15.2)	65.0 (18.3)	71.4 (21.9)	78.1 (25.6)	83.6 (28.7)	85.4 (29.7)	85.6 (29.8)	81.5 (27.5)	73.9 (23.3)	64.6 (18.1)	58.0 (14.4)	71.8 (22.1)
Mean daily minimum °F (°C)	46.0 (7.8)	50.2 (10.1)	56.7 (13.7)	63.3 (17.4)	71.3 (21.8)	77.2 (25.1)	79.1 (26.2)	78.5 (25.8)	73.0 (22.8)	64.1 (17.8)	54.8 (12.7)	48.2 (9.0)	63.5 (17.5)
Mean minimum °F (°C)	29.8 (−1.2)	33.6 (0.9)	36.2 (2.3)	45.0 (7.2)	56.6 (13.7)	68.0 (20.0)	72.0 (22.2)	71.3 (21.8)	59.7 (15.4)	45.6 (7.6)	35.8 (2.1)	31.2 (−0.4)	27.2 (−2.7)
Record low °F (°C)	13 (−11)	13 (−11)	22 (−6)	32 (0)	44 (7)	56 (13)	63 (17)	60 (16)	49 (9)	30 (−1)	25 (−4)	9 (−13)	9 (−13)
Average precipitation inches (mm)	3.25 (83)	1.89 (48)	2.71 (69)	2.67 (68)	3.86 (98)	4.55 (116)	3.67 (93)	3.91 (99)	5.88 (149)	4.33 (110)	3.39 (86)	2.98 (76)	43.09 (1,094)
Average precipitation days (≥ 0.01 in)	8.9	7.7	6.6	6.0	6.4	8.2	7.1	8.1	10.4	7.2	7.2	8.9	92.7
Source: NOAA

== Demographics ==
Historical population
Census	Pop.	Note	%±
1870	35		—
1910	1,389		—
1920	1,335		−3.9%
1930	1,318		−1.3%
1940	2,288		73.6%
1950	2,799		22.3%
1960	3,676		31.3%
1970	3,642		−0.9%
1980	4,667		28.1%
1990	4,418		−5.3%
2000	5,153		16.6%
2010	4,718		−8.4%
2020	4,395		−6.8%
U.S. Decennial Census

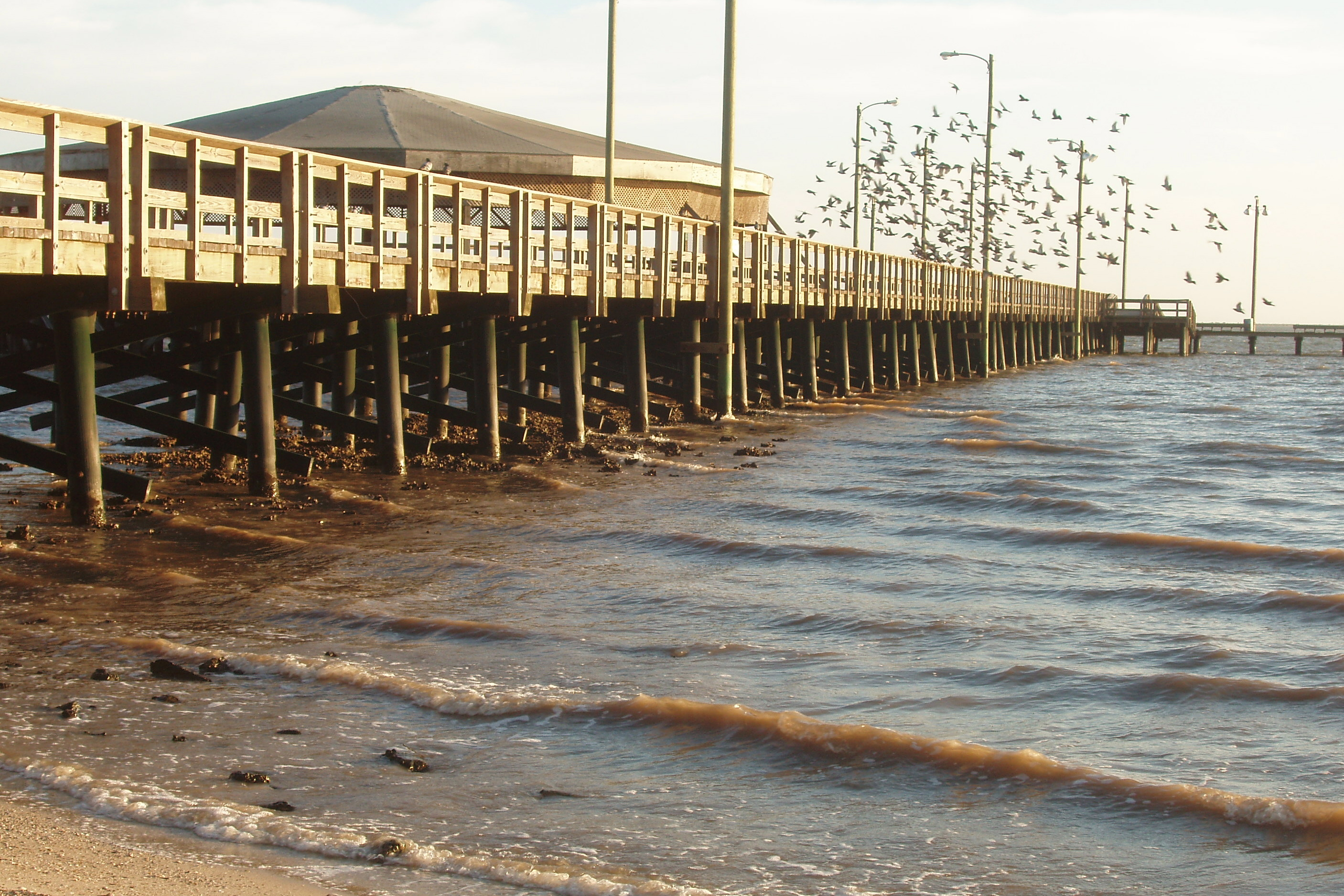
Pier on Palacios waterfront

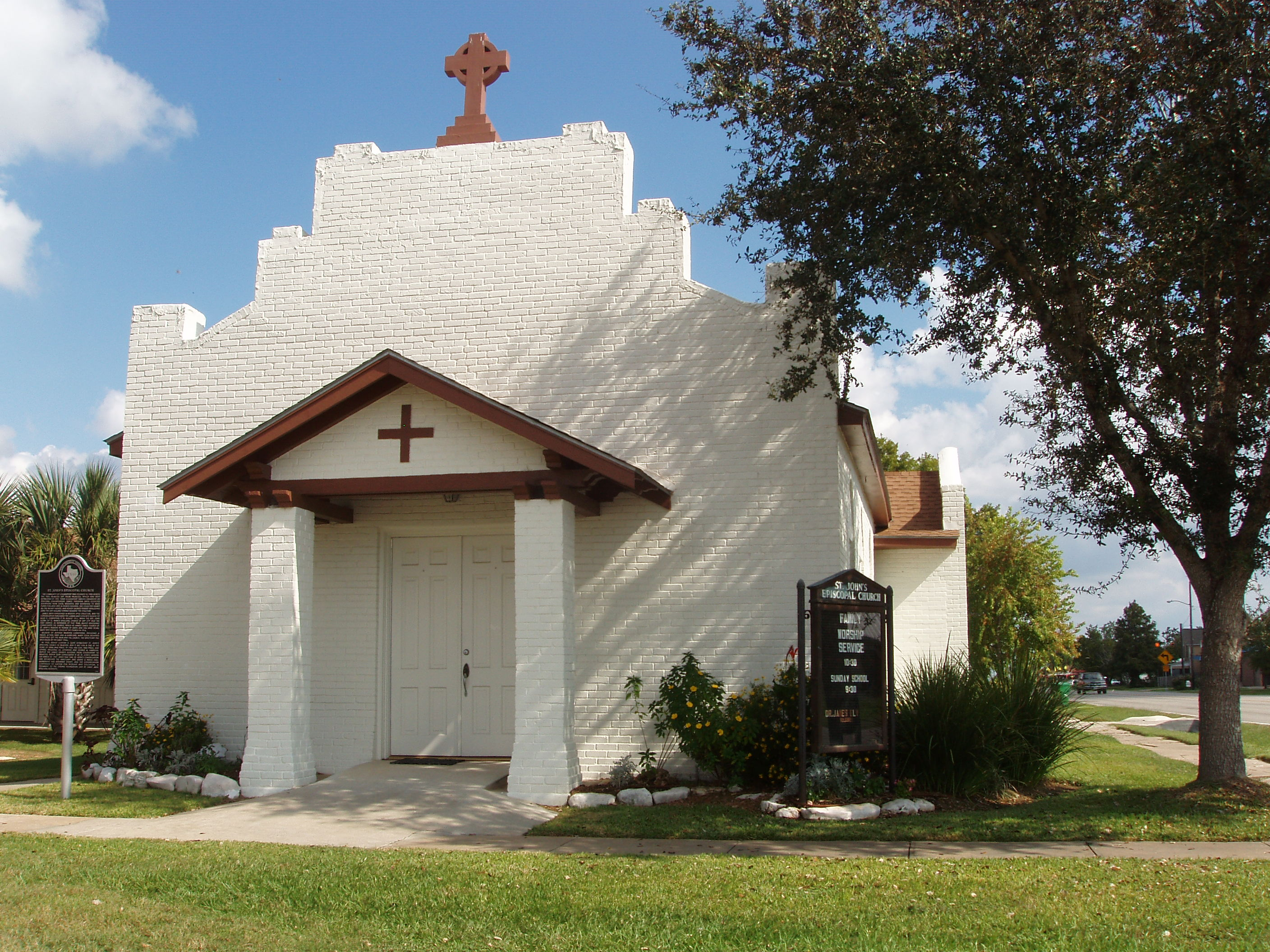
One of many small churches in Palacios

=== 2020 census ===
As of the 2020 census, Palacios had a population of 4,395, 1,594 households, and 1,038 families residing in the city.

The median age was 37.1 years; 26.6% of residents were under the age of 18 and 16.7% were 65 years of age or older. For every 100 females there were 96.9 males, and for every 100 females age 18 and over there were 98.4 males age 18 and over.

0.0% of residents lived in urban areas, while 100.0% lived in rural areas.

There were 1,594 households in Palacios, of which 36.8% had children under the age of 18 living in them. Of all households, 48.4% were married-couple households, 18.6% were households with a male householder and no spouse or partner present, and 28.0% were households with a female householder and no spouse or partner present. About 24.5% of all households were made up of individuals and 12.8% had someone living alone who was 65 years of age or older.

There were 1,938 housing units, of which 17.8% were vacant. The homeowner vacancy rate was 4.9% and the rental vacancy rate was 13.1%.

Racial composition as of the 2020 census
Race	Number	Percent
White	1,842	41.9%
Black or African American	135	3.1%
American Indian and Alaska Native	28	0.6%
Asian	430	9.8%
Native Hawaiian and Other Pacific Islander	2	0.0%
Some other race	792	18.0%
Two or more races	1,166	26.5%
Hispanic or Latino (of any race)	2,750	62.6%

=== 2000 census ===
As of the 2000 census, 5,153 people, 1,661 households, and 1,244 families resided in the city. The population density was 1,021.4 inhabitants per square mile (394.4/km^{2}). There were 1,976 housing units at an average density of 391.7 per square mile (151.2/km^{2}). The racial makeup of the city was 57% White, 5% African American, 1% Native American, 12% Asian, 22% from other races, and 33% from two or more races. Hispanics or Latinos of any race were 51% of the population.

Palacios has a high percentage of Asian-Americans, as it is home to a large community of Vietnamese immigrants and their families.

Of the 1,661 households, 44.7% had children under the age of 18 living with them, 55.4% were married couples living together, 13.4% had a female householder with no husband present, and 25.1% were not families. About 22.0% of all households were made up of individuals, and 10.2% had someone living alone who was 65 years of age or older. The average household size was 3.08 and the average family size was 3.64.

In the city, the population was distributed as 35.4% under the age of 18, 9.1% from 18 to 24, 25.8% from 25 to 44, 18.6% from 45 to 64, and 11.1% who were 65 years of age or older. The median age was 30 years. For every 100 females, there were 100.9 males. For every 100 females age 18 and over, there were 95.7 males.

The median income for a household in the city was $27,623, and for a family was $35,518. Males had a median income of $27,483 versus $21,875 for females. The per capita income for the city was $13,107. About 19.8% of families and 24.2% of the population were below the poverty line, including 28.9% of those under age 18 and 14.3% of those age 65 or over.

== Economy ==
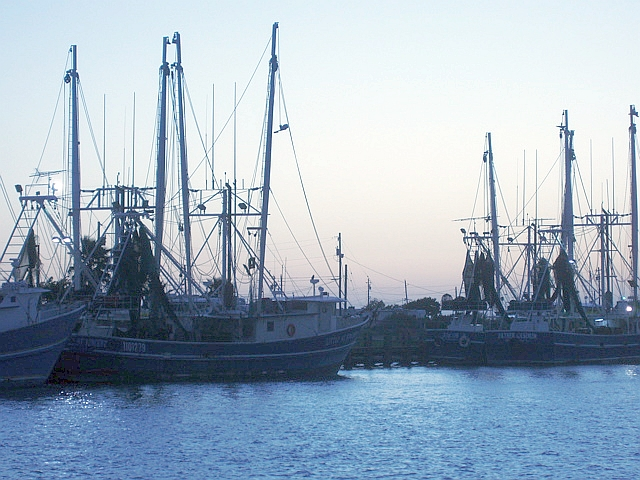
Shrimping boats in the harbor at Palacios

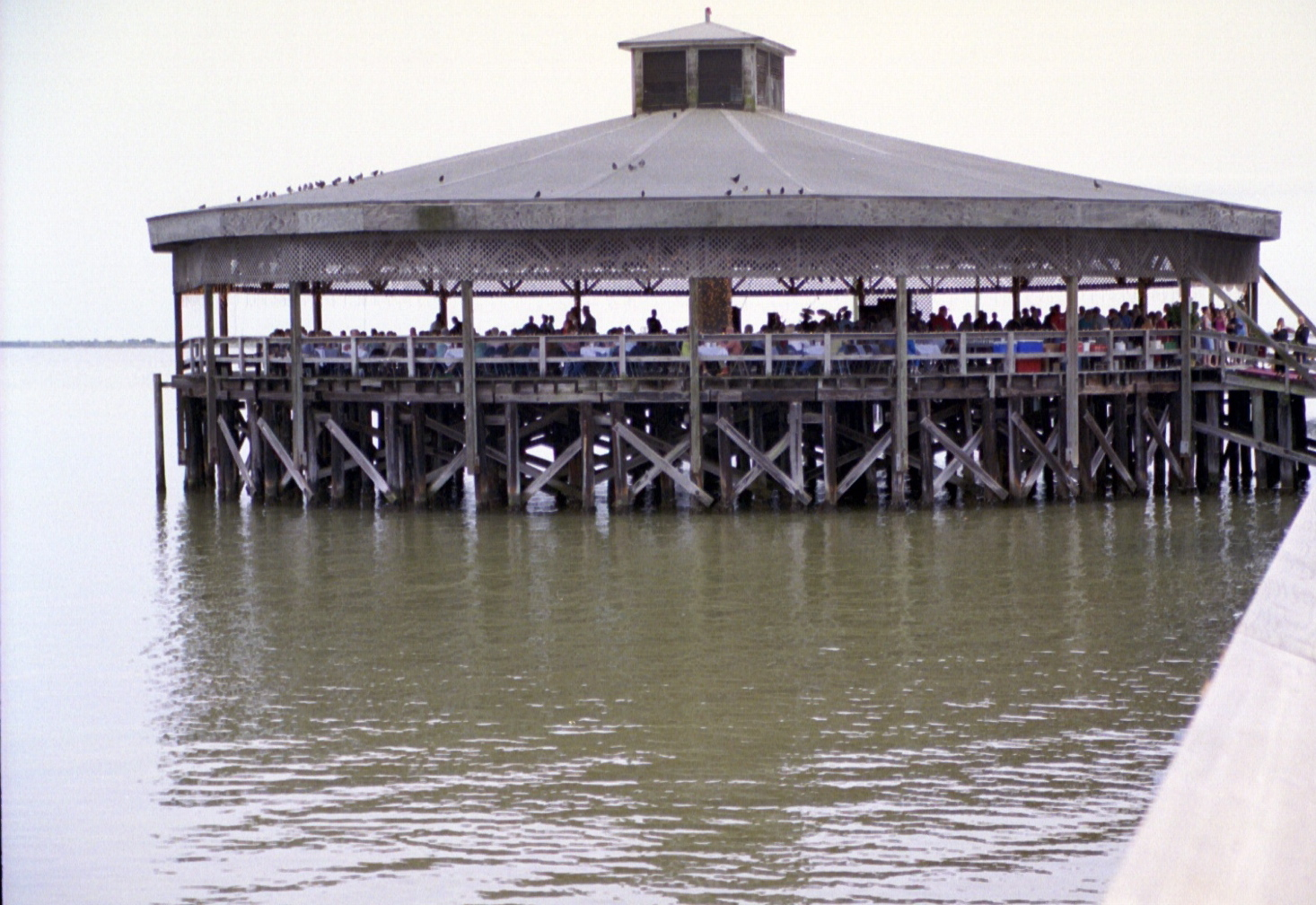
A wedding at Palacios pavilion before a hurricane damaged the roof

Home to about 400 vessels, Palacios is the third-largest shrimping port on the Texas Gulf Coast, and has proclaimed itself to be the "Shrimp Capital of Texas". The most common industries are educational services, agriculture/fishing, and construction. The area has also long been a major center for energy production, and the county is positioning itself as an "energy cluster" for both conventional and alternative "green" power generation, with over $3 billion in new construction undergoing permitting as of 2011. The local tourism industry is based on fishing, boating, birding and eco-tourism opportunities.

== Government ==
The City of Palacios has a council-manager government. As of November, 2022, the mayor is Jim Gardner. The former mayor was Linh Chau, the first Vietnamese mayor in Texas. As of 2025, the mayor is Rick Cink.

== Education ==
Palacios and neighboring areas are served by the Palacios Independent School District. The school district includes Central Elementary, East Side Elementary, Palacios Junior High School, and Palacios High School (the junior high school and high school reside on the same campus grounds).

The designated community college for Palacios ISD is Wharton County Junior College.

The City by the Sea Museum offers educational programming.

== Media ==
Palacios is home to the Palacios Beacon, a weekly newspaper established in 1907.

== Infrastructure ==
=== Transportation ===
The city is accessed by Texas State Highway 35 and served by the Palacios Municipal Airport. The Palacios Channel connects the Port of Palacios to the Gulf Intracoastal Waterway. Greyhound Lines offers direct bus service from Palacios to Houston, Corpus Christi, and the Rio Grande Valley.

== Notable people ==
- Daniel E. Flores, Bishop of Brownsville, youngest Catholic bishop in the U.S. at the time of his episcopal appointment
- William L. Jungers, anthropologist, best known for his work on the biomechanics of bipedal locomotion in hominids such as the 3.4 million-year-old Lucy
- Priscilla Owen, judge on the U.S. Court of Appeals for the Fifth Circuit
- Monty Stratton, Major League Baseball pitcher from the 1930s

== See also ==
- René-Robert Cavelier, Sieur de La Salle
- French colonization of Texas
- Karankawa people
- La Belle (ship)
