= 56th Cavalry Brigade =

Former brigade of the Texas Army National Guard

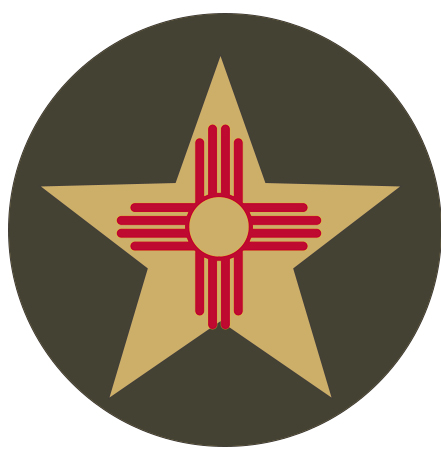
- Active: 1921-1944
- Country: United States
- Branch: Army National Guard
- Type: Cavalry Brigade

Commanders
- Notable commanders: Brigadier General Jacob F. Wolters (Texas) - 1 June 1921–20 November 1934 Brigadier General Louis S. Davidson (Texas) - 23 November 1934–20 August 1938 Brigadier General Walter B. Pyron (Texas) - 20 August 1938–13 September 1941 Brigadier General Charles H. Gerhardt (Regular Army) - 13 September 1941–6 January 1942

The 56th Cavalry Brigade was a brigade of the Texas Army National Guard. Its legacy is carried by the modern-day 56th Infantry Brigade Combat Team.

== History ==
The 56th Cavalry Brigade was constituted in the National Guard in 1921, assigned to the 23rd Cavalry Division, and allotted to the state of Texas. The brigade headquarters was organized on 20 July 1921 by redesignation of the Headquarters, 1st Texas Cavalry Brigade (organized on 23 August 1918 and federally recognized at Houston, Texas) as Headquarters, 56th Cavalry Brigade, and concurrently federally recognized at Houston. The headquarters troop was organized on 30 July 1921 by redesignation of Headquarters Troop, 3rd Texas Cavalry, at Brenham, Texas. The headquarters troop was redesignated Troop A, 56th Machine Gun Squadron, on 19 April 1924 at Brenham; concurrently, a new headquarters troop was organized at San Antonio, Texas, by redesignation of Troop A, 56th Machine Gun Squadron. The brigade headquarters was relocated to Dallas, Texas, on 30 November 1934, and to San Antonio on 1 March 1935.

The brigade initially consisted of the 111th Cavalry Regiment from New Mexico and Colorado and the 112th Cavalry Regiment from Texas. In 1929, the 111th Cavalry was relieved from the brigade and replaced with the newly-constituted 124th Cavalry Regiment from Texas.

The brigade, or elements thereof, was called up to perform the following state duties: Headquarters and Headquarters Troop to perform martial law in connection with lawless conditions in Mexia, Texas, 12 January–1 March 1922; Headquarters Troop to perform escort duty in Houston, 11–12 May 1925; Headquarters and Headquarters Troop and six subordinate troops to perform martial law in connection with lawless conditions in Borger, Texas, 28 September–18 October 1929; entire brigade to perform martial law in four counties in east Texas in connection with preventing “hot oil” production in the East Texas Oil Field near Kilgore, Texas, 17 August 1931, with some elements remaining on active duty until 17 December 1932.

The brigade conducted summer training at Camp Mabry, Texas, 1921–23; Camp Stanley, Texas; 1924–26; and Camp Wolters, Texas, 1927–39. For at least two years, in 1932 and 1933, the brigade’s subordinate regiments also trained some 26 company-grade Organized Reserve cavalry officers of the 63rd Cavalry Division's 156th Cavalry Brigade at Camp Wolters. The brigade's designated mobilization training station was Fort Brown, Texas, 1921–33, and Fort Bliss, Texas, 1933–40. In about October 1938, during the efforts to organize the headquarters of the remaining three inactive National Guard cavalry divisions (the 24th Cavalry Division had been organized in 1936), the 56th Cavalry Brigade was relieved from assignment to the 23rd Cavalry Division and assigned to the Third Army as a separate brigade in the protective mobilization plan. The 56th Cavalry Brigade was inducted into active federal service at home stations on 18 November 1940, and was transferred to Fort Bliss, arriving there 27 November 1940 and being attached to the 1st Cavalry Division. The Headquarters and Headquarters Troop was transferred to Fort McIntosh, Texas, on 30 January 1941. Concurrently, the remainder of the brigade relieved the 1st Cavalry Division's 1st Cavalry Brigade of responsibility for the Rio Grande River border posts and the Mexican Border Patrol. Headquarters and Headquarters Troop assumed command and control of the Eastern Sector, Southern Land Frontier of the Southern Defense Command. Returned to Fort Bliss on 26 May 1941 for preliminary maneuver training with the 1st Cavalry Division in June–July 1941. After the Louisiana Maneuvers in September–October 1941, the brigade returned to Fort McIntosh.

The brigade moved to Fort D. A. Russell, near Marfa, Texas, on 2 November 1943, but returned to Fort McIntosh on 23 December 1943, where it was assigned to the Fourth Army on 21 January 1944. On 12 May 1944, the Army Ground Forces eliminated the 56th Cavalry Brigade when no use for it developed overseas. The Headquarters and Headquarters Troop, 56th Cavalry Brigade was reorganized and redesignated the 56th Cavalry Reconnaissance Troop, Mechanized. It did not see combat, but the former brigade's subordinate cavalry regiments went on to fight in the Pacific and China-Burma-India theaters.

== Commanding officers ==
- Brigadier General Jacob F. Wolters (Texas) - 1 June 1921–20 November 1934
- Brigadier General Louis S. Davidson (Texas) - 23 November 1934–20 August 1938
- Brigadier General Walter B. Pyron (Texas) - 20 August 1938–13 September 1941
- Brigadier General Charles H. Gerhardt (Regular Army) - 13 September 1941–6 January 1942
