= Camp Hulen =

US military training camp near Palacios, Texas

Coordinates: 28°42′24″N 96°14′36″W

Camp Hulen was a military training camp near Palacios, Texas, United States that operated from 1925 until 1946 and, at one time, supported the largest concentration of troops for field training in the United States military.

Camp Palacios was established in 1925 as a summer training camp for the 36th Infantry of the Texas National Guard. The camp was renamed for Major John A. Hulen (1871–1957) in 1930. In 1940, the War Department leased Camp Hulen for anti-aircraft training of National Guard units from around the country.

At its peak, the camp had facilities for 12,000 military personnel and continued as a training facility until early 1944. German prisoners of war were housed at Camp Hulen from 1943 to 1945. In 1946, the War Department returned Camp Hulen to the National Guard, which found it had become too small; the camp was subsequently closed and dismantled.

The airfield located on the base became the Palacios Municipal Airport in 1965. In 2005, a housing development company bought the remainder of the land that formerly composed Camp Hulen.

== See also ==
- List of World War II prisoner-of-war camps in the United States
