= Reece J. Lutz =

US Army brigadier general

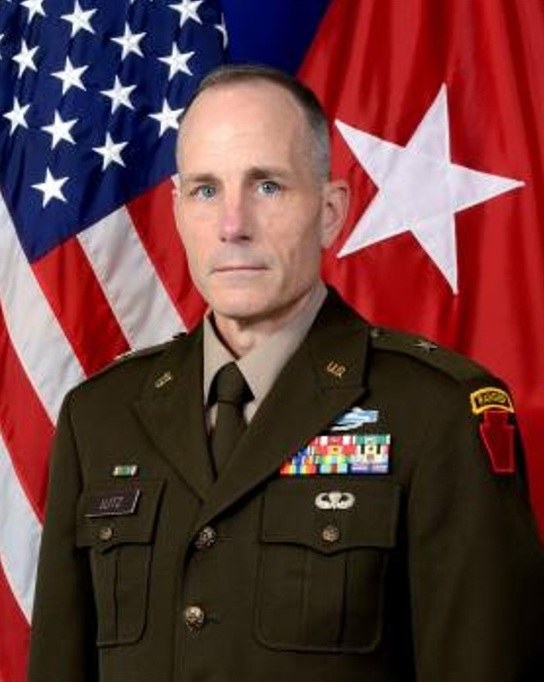
- Lutz in 2024
- Born: 1970 (age 55–56)
- Alma mater: Pennsylvania State University; United States Army Command and General Staff College; United States Army War College
- Spouse(s): Alison Helene Archer (m. 1999–2010) Dusty
- Military career
- Service: United States Army; Pennsylvania Army National Guard
- Service years: 1988–present
- Rank: Brigadier General
- Unit: US Army Infantry Branch
- Commands: Company A, 1st Battalion, 110th Infantry Regiment; 2nd Battalion, 112th Infantry Regiment; 2nd Brigade, 28th Infantry Division; 28th Infantry Division
- Conflicts: Iraq War; Operation Enduring Freedom; Operation Spartan Shield
- Awards: Bronze Star Medal; Meritorious Service Medal (4); Army Commendation Medal (6); Army Achievement Medal (2)

Reece James Lutz (born 1970) is a career officer in the United States Army. A longtime member of the Pennsylvania Army National Guard, his command assignments include: Company A, 1st Battalion, 110th Infantry Regiment; 2nd Battalion, 112th Infantry Regiment; and 2nd Brigade, 28th Infantry Division He was promoted to brigadier general in 2024, and in 2025 he was assigned to command of the 28th Infantry Division. Lutz is a veteran of the Iraq War, Operation Enduring Freedom, and Operation Spartan Shield, and his awards include the Bronze Star Medal, four awards of the Meritorious Service Medal, six awards of the Army Commendation Medal, and two awards of the Army Achievement Medal.

== Early life ==
Reece J. Lutz was born in 1970, the son of James J. Lutz and Barbara J. (McIntosh) Lutz. He was raised and educated in Lilly, Pennsylvania and is a 1988 graduate of Portage, Pennsylvania's Portage Area High School. After high school, Lutz enlisted in the United States Army; he was trained as a utilities equipment mechanic and served at posts including Camp Kyle, South Korea.

Lutz attended Pennsylvania State University from 1993 to 1997 and graduated with a Bachelor of Science degree in biology. He participated in the Reserve Officers' Training Corps program while attending college and at graduation he received his commission as a second lieutenant of Infantry. As a sophomore, Lutz received the J. Andrew March Award, which is presented annually to the second year Penn State ROTC cadet who best exemplifies leadership and academic excellence.

== Start of career ==
After receiving his commission, Lutz entered active duty as an Infantry platoon leader with Company C, 1st Battalion, 41st Infantry Regiment at Fort Riley, Kansas. In November 1998, he received promotion to first lieutenant. In June 1999, he was assigned as the battalion's support platoon leader. From May 2000 to May 2001, Lutz was assigned as assistant intelligence officer (Assistant S2), on the staff of 3rd Brigade, 1st Armored Division at Fort Riley. He was promoted to captain in December 2000.

=== Military education ===
- Infantry Officer Basic Course
- United States Army Airborne School
- Ranger School
- Infantry Officer Advanced Course
- United States Army Command and General Staff College
- United States Army War College (Master of Strategic Studies, 2020)

== Continued career ==
After completing his active army service, Lutz taught school in the Pittsburgh area and joined the Pennsylvania Army National Guard, where he was assigned as assistant S2 for 2nd Infantry Brigade Combat Team, 28th Infantry Division in Washington, Pennsylvania. From August 2004 to September 2006, he was assigned as commander of Company A, 1st Battalion, 110th Infantry in Indiana, Pennsylvania, which included overseas deployment for the Iraq War. From September 2006 to April 2008, he served as plans officer (assistant S3) on the 2nd Brigade's staff. From April to November 2008, Lutz was assigned as (S2) on the 2nd Brigade staff, and he was promoted to major in January 2008.

Lutz served as operations officer (S3) for 1st Battalion, 110th Infantry Regiment in Mount Pleasant, Pennsylvania. From January 2011 to December 2011, he was assigned as executive officer for 1-110th Infantry. He was assigned as S3 for the 2nd Infantry Brigade Combat Team from December 2011 to September 2012. From September 2012 to March 2015, he was assigned as the 28th Infantry Division's assistant chief of staff for Intelligence (G2) in Harrisburg, Pennsylvania. In September 2013, Lutz was promoted to lieutenant colonel.

== Later career ==
From March 2015 to March 2018, Lutz commanded 2nd Battalion, 112th Infantry Regiment in Lewistown, Pennsylvania. From March 2018 to July 2020, he was assigned as executive officer for the 56th Stryker Brigade Combat Team in Horsham, Pennsylvania. In July 2020, he was promoted to colonel and assigned to command the 2nd Infantry Brigade Combat Team. From June 2022 to September 2023, Lutz served as the 28th Infantry Division's chief of staff, including deployment to Kuwait for Operation Enduring Freedom and Operation Spartan Shield.

From September 2023 to March 2024, Lutz was assigned as chief of the joint staff at the Pennsylvania National Guard's Joint Force Headquarters at Fort Indiantown Gap. In April 2024, he was promoted to brigadier general and assigned as the 28th Infantry Division's assistant division commander for maneuver. As a general officer, Lutz resided in New Bloomfield, Pennsylvania and was employed by the National Guard as a Title 32 dual-status federal technician. In October 2025, Lutz was assigned to succeed Michael E. Wegscheider as commander of the 28th Infantry Division.

== Awards ==
Lutz's awards and decorations include:

- Bronze Star Medal
- Meritorious Service Medal with 3 bronze oak leaf clusters
- Army Commendation Medal with 1 silver oak leaf cluster
- Army Achievement Medal with 1 bronze oak leaf cluster
- Navy Unit Commendation with 1 bronze star
- National Defense Service Medal with 1 bronze service star
- Iraq Campaign Medal with 1 bronze service star
- Global War on Terrorism Service Medal
- Armed Forces Service Medal
- Armed Forces Reserve Medal with silver hourglass, M device and numeral 2
- Army Service Ribbon
- Overseas Service Ribbon with numeral 3
- Army Reserve Components Overseas Training Ribbon with numeral 3
- Master Combat Infantryman Badge
- Combat Infantryman Badge
- Expert Infantryman Badge
- Parachutist Badge
- Ranger Tab

== Effective dates of promotion ==
The dates of Lutz's promotion are:

- Second Lieutenant, 16 May 1997
- First Lieutenant, 16 November 1998
- Captain, 1 December 2000
- Major, 15 January 2008
- Lieutenant Colonel, 20 September 2013
- Colonel, 1 July 2020
- Brigadier General, 11 April 2024
