= 28th Infantry Division (United States) =

US Army National Guard formation

- Shoulder sleeve insignia of the 28th Infantry Division (1918–current)
- Active: 12 March 1879–17 May 1919; 22 December 1921–present
- Country: United States
- Branch: United States Army National Guard
- Type: Light infantry Stryker infantry
- Size: Division
- Garrison/HQ: Harrisburg Military Post
- Nicknames: "Keystone" (special designation); "Iron Division"
- Mottos: "Fire and Movement", "Roll On"
- Engagements: World War I; Champagne-Marne; Aisne-Marne; Oise-Aisne; Meuse-Argonne; Champagne 1918; Lorraine 1918; World War II; Normandy; Northern France; Rhineland; Ardennes-Alsace; Central Europe; Gulf War; Operation Desert Storm; Kosovo Force; War on terror; Afghanistan; Iraq; Operation Inherent Resolve

Commanders
- Current commander: BG Reece J. Lutz
- Notable commanders: MG John F. Hartranft; MG Omar N. Bradley; MG Norman Cota

Insignia
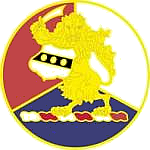
- Distinctive unit insignia

- Flag

- Combat service identification badge

The 28th Infantry Division ("Keystone") is a unit of the United States Army National Guard, and is the oldest division-sized unit in the Army. Some of the units of the division can trace their lineage to Benjamin Franklin's battalion, The Pennsylvania Associators (1747–1777). The division was officially established in 1879 and federalized in 1914 for service with the US Army when the First World War started, and was redesignated as the 28th Division in 1917, after the entry of America into that war. Today, the division contains units from Pennsylvania, Maryland, Ohio, and New Jersey.

It was originally nicknamed the "Keystone Division," as it was formed from units of the Pennsylvania Army National Guard, Pennsylvania being known as the "Keystone State." It was federalized during World War II, during which it was given the nickname the "Bloody Bucket" division by German forces due to the shape and color of its red keystone insignia. Today the 28th Infantry Division goes by the name given to it by General Pershing during World War I: "Iron Division." The 28th is the first Army National Guard division to field the Stryker infantry fighting vehicle, as part of the Army's reorganization in the first decade of the 2000s.

The 28th is also one of the most decorated infantry divisions in the United States Army.

== Creation ==
On 12 March 1879, Governor Henry Hoyt signed General Order Number One appointing Maj. Gen. John F. Hartranft as the first Division commander of the National Guard of Pennsylvania. Pennsylvania was the first state to structure its National Guard units at such a high tactical level in peacetime. From 11 to 18 August 1894, Camp Samuel W. Crawford was the "Division Encampment at Gettysburg".

The division was mustered into federal service for the Spanish–American War in 1898. Pennsylvania initially levied 10,800 men, in ten infantry regiments and four artillery batteries. The entire division was mustered into federal service between 6 May and 22 July, and while 8,900 men had assembled at Mount Gretna for the muster parade on 28 April 1898, there was no difficulty in raising 12,000 men for service in two and a half months. However, only the 4th, 10th, and 16th Regiments, three artillery batteries, and three cavalry troops were deployed, to Puerto Rico. The 10th Regiment was then sent to the Philippines, being ordered home on 30 June 1899.

The division was called up to respond to labor disturbances in 1877 and 1900.

In 1914 the division was designated the 7th Division as part of a broad reorganization of the National Guard. On 29 June 1916, the 7th Division was mustered into federal service at Mount Gretna and deployed to El Paso, Texas, to serve along the Mexican border as the Regular Punitive Expedition entered Mexico. Major General Charles M. Clement commanded, directing the First Brigade comprising the 1st, 2nd, and 3rd Regiments, the Second Brigade the 10th, 16th, and 18th Regiments, and the Third Brigade the 4th, 6th, and 8th Regiments. There was also a regiment of cavalry and one of artillery, plus two companies of signals troops and medical units. The camp outside El Paso gained the title 'Camp Stewart' after the Adjutant General, Thomas J. Stewart. On 19 September, one brigade was sent home. On 14 November, the 1st Artillery left for home; the 18th Infantry left for Pennsylvania on 18 December, and the remainder of the division between 2–19 January 1917. It appears that most of the division was mustered out of federal service on 23 February 1917 at Philadelphia.

The remnant left on the border included the 8th and 13th Regiments, the newly formed 3rd Artillery and Company C of the Engineers. They were released from active service in March 1917. However, the call-up process for World War I was underway as these units left the border. The 13th Regiment began its return home from Texas on 21 March 1917, but en route were told that their mustering-out orders had been rescinded.

== History ==
=== World War I ===
==== Federalization ====
The division moved to Camp Hancock, Georgia, in April 1917, the same month of the American entry into World War I, and was there when the entire division was drafted into federal service on 5 August 1917. From May to 11 October 1917, the division was reorganized into the two-brigade, four-regiment scheme, also known as a square division, and thus became the 28th Division.

The Turner Publishing account says that:

The situation for the division at Camp Hancock was dismal. The men arrived there in summer uniforms, which were not replaced by winter ones until the winter was well along. Adequate blankets were not available until January. Training equipment was woeful. There was but one bayonet for each three men; machine guns made of wood; and there was but one 37-mm gun for the whole division.

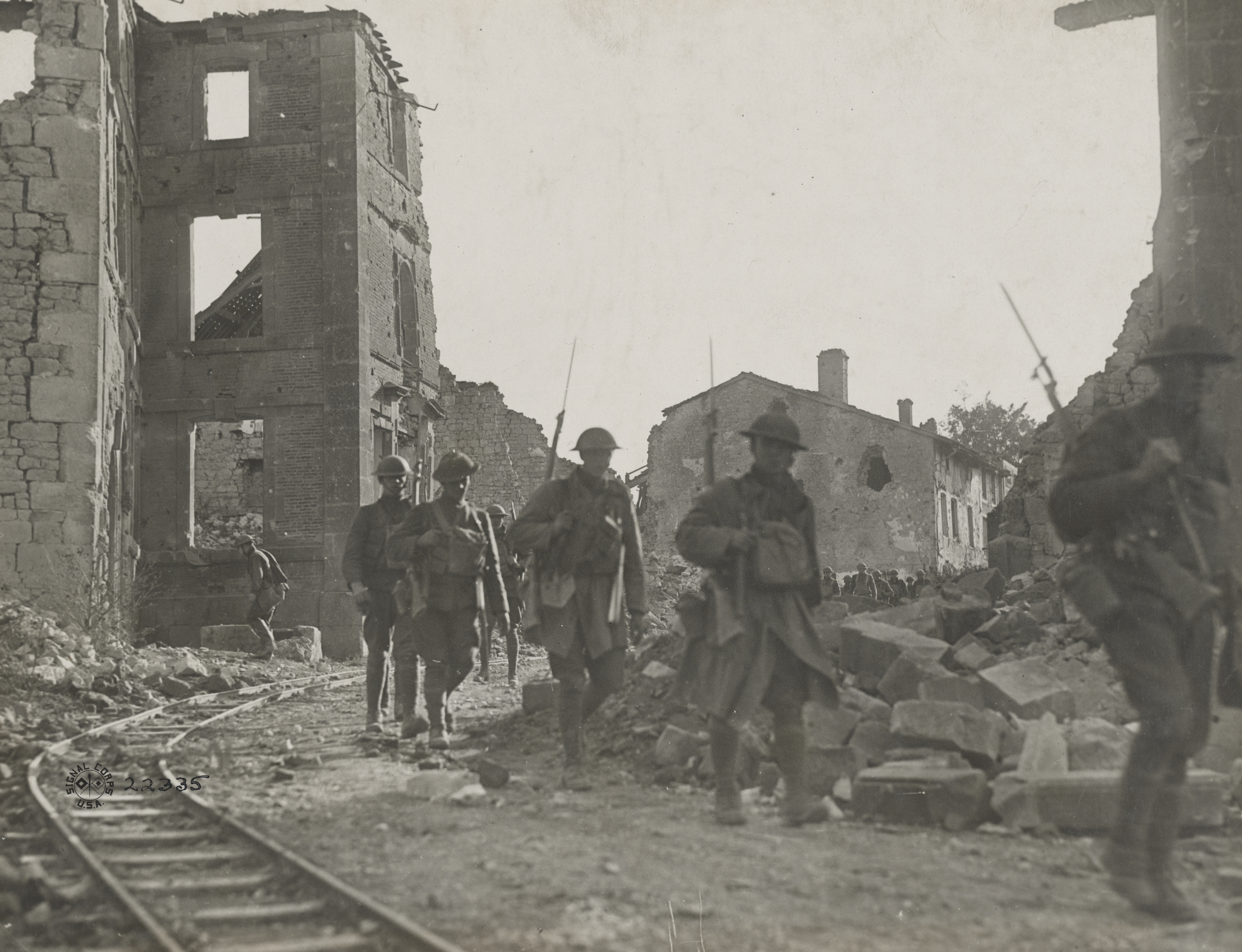
Doughboys of Company K, 110th Infantry Regiment, 28th Division, passing through a town captured by their comrades, Varennes-en-Argonne, Meuse, France, September 26, 1918.

In March 1918, several thousand National Army men sent from Camp Lee, Virginia, Camp George G. Meade, Maryland, and Camp Travis, Texas, were assigned to replace losses and complete the division.

==== Overseas service ====
By May 1918, after several months of training, the division had arrived in Europe, and began training with the British. On 14 July, ahead of an expected German offensive, the division was moving forward, with most of it committed to the second line of defense south of the Marne River and east of Château-Thierry. As the division took up defensive positions, the Germans commenced their attack, which became the Battle of Chateau-Thierry, with a fierce artillery bombardment. When the German assault collided with the main force of the 28th, the fighting became bitter hand-to-hand combat. The 28th repelled the German forces and decisively defeated their enemy. However, four isolated companies of the 109th and 110th Infantry stationed on the first defensive line suffered heavy losses. After the battle, General John Pershing, commander of the American Expeditionary Force, visited the battlefield and declared that the 28th soldiers were "Men of Iron" and named the 28th ID as his "Iron Division." The 28th developed a red keystone-shaped shoulder patch, officially adopted on 27 October 1918.

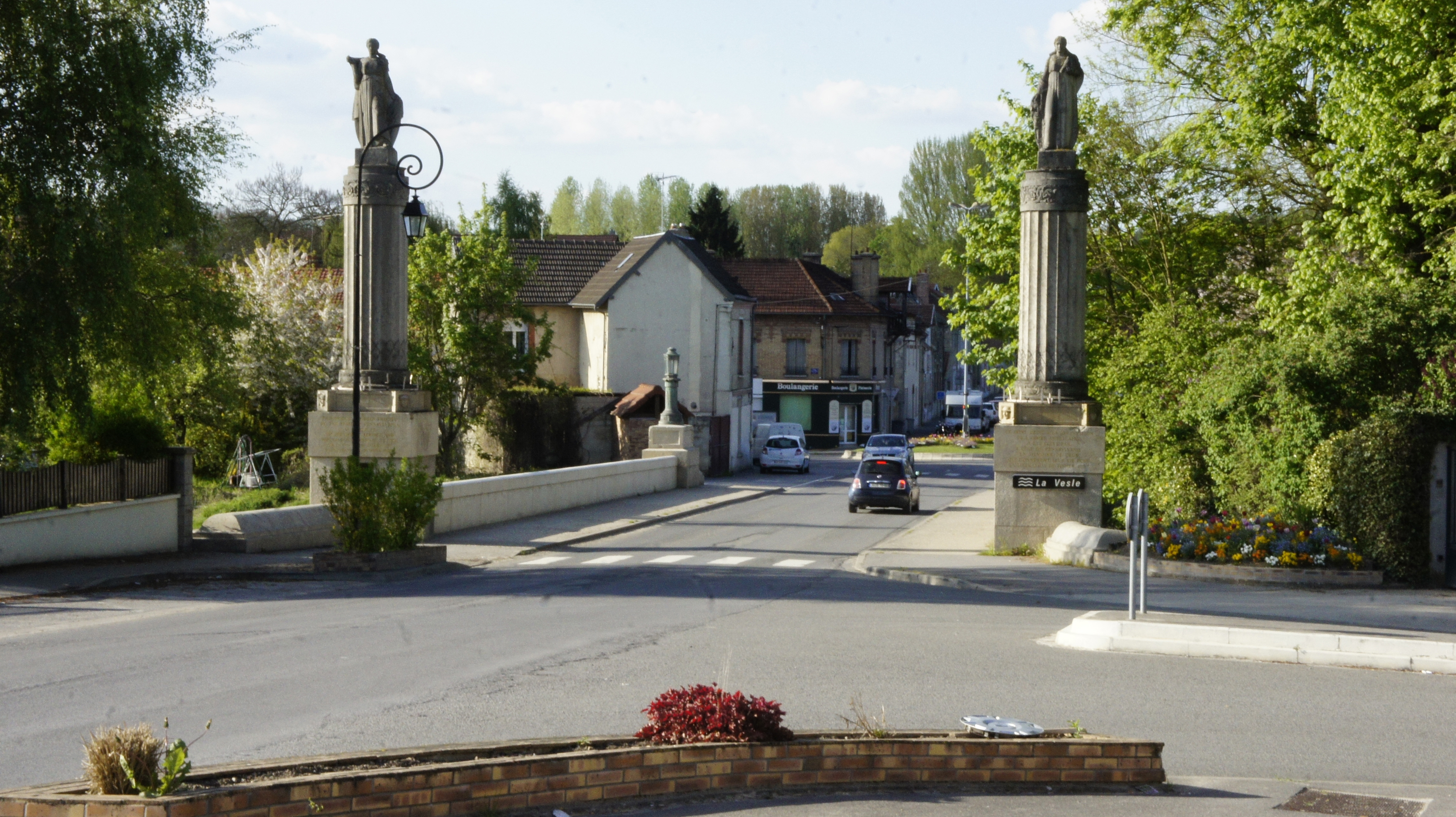
A bridge in Fismes, raised in homage to the 28th Division's operations in Champagne.

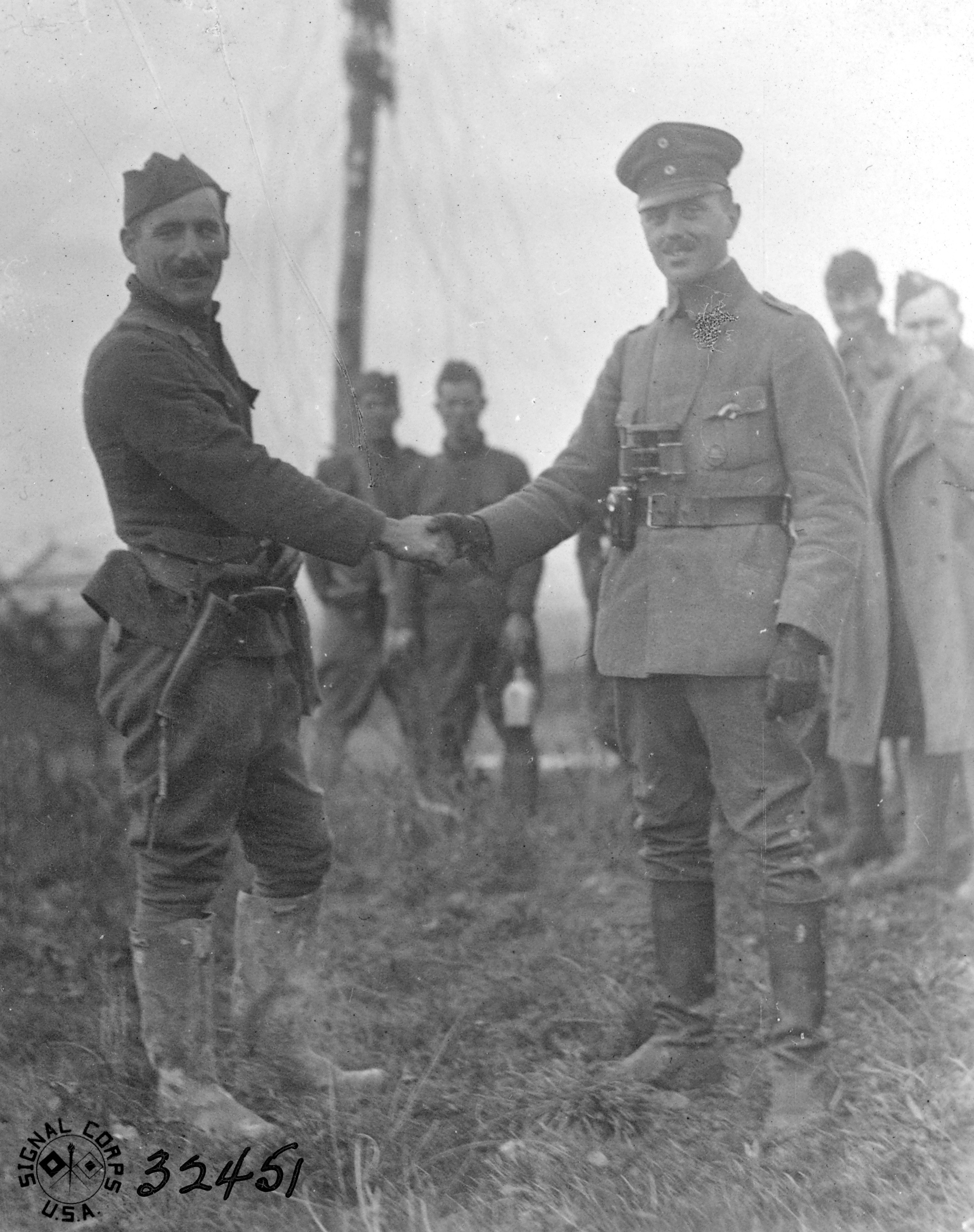
Corporal Bubel, of the 103rd Field Signal Battalion, 28th Division, shaking hands with a German officer on line near Dampvitoux, France, November 12, 1918.

During World War I, the division was involved in the Meuse-Argonne, Champagne-Marne, Aisne-Marne including the Battle of Fismes and Fismette, Oise-Aisne, and Ypres-Lys (FA) operations. During the war, it took a total of 14,139 casualties (2,165 killed and 11,974 wounded). Two individuals received the Medal of Honor: Sergeant James I. Mestrovitch, Company C, 111th Infantry; and Major Joseph H. Thompson, Headquarters, 110th Infantry. Edwin Martin wrote about the history of the division during World War I can be found in his book The Twenty-Eighth Division: Pennsylvania's Guard in the World War.

==== Order of battle ====
- Headquarters, 28th Division
- 55th Infantry Brigade
  - 109th Infantry Regiment (1st Pennsylvania Infantry and 1,779 men from 13th Pennsylvania Infantry, less band)
  - 110th Infantry Regiment (3rd Pennsylvania Infantry, less band, and 10th Pennsylvania Infantry)
  - 108th Machine Gun Battalion (Machine Gun Troop, 1st Pennsylvania Cavalry, 142 men from Company B and parts of Headquarters Company less band, and Supply Company, 4th Pennsylvania Infantry)
- 56th Infantry Brigade
  - 111th Infantry Regiment (56 officers and 1,864 men from 18th Pennsylvania Infantry and 1,852 officers and men from 6th Pennsylvania Infantry, less band)
  - 112th Infantry Regiment (54 officers and 1,860 men from 16th Pennsylvania Infantry, and 1,980 officers and men from 8th Pennsylvania Infantry, less band)
  - 109th Machine Gun Battalion (Machine Gun Company, Companies C and D, and parts of Sanitary Detachment and Supply Company, 4th Pennsylvania Infantry)
- 53rd Field Artillery Brigade
  - 107th Field Artillery Regiment (75 mm) (1st Pennsylvania Field Artillery and 161 men from Troops F and H, 1st Pennsylvania Cavalry)
  - 108th Field Artillery Regiment (155 mm) (2nd Pennsylvania Field Artillery and 441 men from Troops A, C, D and G, I, K, L, and M, 1st Pennsylvania Cavalry)
  - 109th Field Artillery Regiment (75 mm) (3rd Pennsylvania Field Artillery and 159 men from Troops I, K, and L, 1st Pennsylvania Cavalry)
  - 103rd Trench Mortar Battery (detachments of Troops B and M, 1st Pennsylvania Cavalry)
- 107th Machine Gun Battalion (2nd Battalion and parts of Headquarters and Supply Companies, 4th Pennsylvania Infantry)
- 103rd Engineer Regiment (1st Pennsylvania Engineers less 1 officer and 16 men, detachments of Headquarters Troop less band, Supply Troop, and Troops B, E, F, I, and M, 1st Pennsylvania Cavalry)
- 103rd Field Signal Battalion (1st Battalion, Pennsylvania Signal Corps)
- Headquarters Troop, 28th Division (Pennsylvania Division Headquarters Troop and Troop I, 1st Pennsylvania Cavalry)
- 103rd Train Headquarters and Military Police (Pennsylvania division headquarters and military police)
  - 103rd Ammunition Train (Pennsylvania ammunition train)
  - 103rd Engineer Train (1 officer and 16 enlisted men from 1st Pennsylvania Engineers)
  - 103rd Supply Train (Pennsylvania supply train)
  - 103rd Sanitary Train (Pennsylvania sanitary train)
    - 109th, 110th, 111th, and 112th Ambulance Companies and Field Hospitals

=== Interwar period ===
The 28th Division headquarters arrived at the Port of Philadelphia, Pennsylvania, aboard the USS Kroonland on 30 April 1919 after twelve months of overseas service and was demobilized on 17 May 1919 at Camp Dix, New Jersey. In accordance with the National Defense Act of 1920, the division was allotted to the state of Pennsylvania and assigned to the III Corps in 1921. The division headquarters was reorganized and federally recognized on 22 December 1921 at Philadelphia. The headquarters was relocated on 12 March 1933 to Harrisburg, Pennsylvania. The designated mobilization training center for the "Keystone" Division was Camp Bullis, Texas. An honor battalion of Pennsylvania National Guardsmen of the "Iron Division" dedicated the Pennsylvania World War Memorial in Varennes-en-Argonne, France, in 1928. The division, less the 53rd Field Artillery Brigade, conducted summer camp most years at Mount Gretna, Pennsylvania, 1922–34, and at Indiantown Gap Military Reservation, Pennsylvania, 1935–39. The 53rd Field Artillery Brigade conducted its training most years at Tobyhanna, Pennsylvania, so that its subordinate batteries could conduct live-fire training at the ranges located there. Generally, the division staff conducted command post exercises (CPXs) and staff training concurrent with the camps. The division staff also participated in the Third Corps Area CPX 6–19 July 1930 at Camp George G. Meade, Maryland; in the First Army CPXs in July 1931 and 1934 held at Camp Dix; and the army-level CPX at Fort Devens, Massachusetts, in August 1936. For the 1935 camp, the division participated in the Third Corps Area phase of the First Army maneuvers at Indiantown Gap. During that maneuver, the 28th Division operated as part of the provisional III Corps. The "Keystone" Division also participated in the First Army maneuvers in 1939 and 1940 held at Plattsburg and Canton, New York, respectively. In both maneuvers, the 28th Division again operated as part of the provisional III Corps. In addition to the summer training, the entire division was called up for flood relief duty in March and April 1936 when Pennsylvania rivers overflowed in one of the worst floods in state history. The division was relieved from the III Corps on 30 December 1940 and assigned to the II Corps.

==== Commanders ====
- Major General William G. Price Jr. (22 December 1921 – 23 March 1933)
- Major General Edward C. Shannon (23 March 1933 – 24 June 1939)
- Major General Edward Martin (26 June 1939 – 27 January 1942)

=== World War II ===
==== WWII division organization ====
===== Square division =====
On 17 February 1941, the 28th Division, commanded by Major General Edward Martin, was inducted into federal service at home stations and then assembled at Fort Indiantown Gap in Pennsylvania. At the time the division still retained its World War I square organization and consisted of the following units.

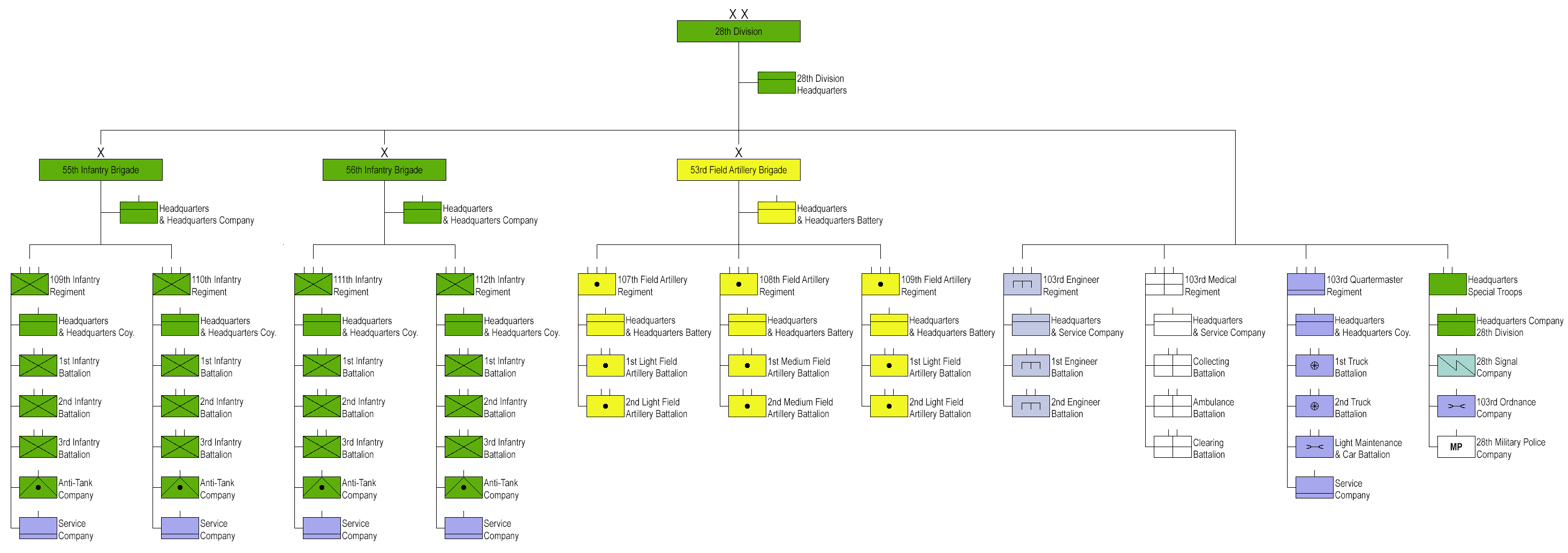
28th Division square organization (click to enlarge)

- 28th Division
  - 28th Division Headquarters
  - 55th Infantry Brigade
    - Headquarters and Headquarters Company
    - 109th Infantry Regiment
      - Headquarters and Headquarters Company
      - 3× Infantry battalions
        - each battalion consists of: 1× Headquarters and Headquarters Detachment, 3× Rifle companies, 1× Weapons Company
      - Anti-Tank Company (M3 37mm Anti-Tank guns)
      - Service Company
    - 110th Infantry Regiment
      - same organization as 109th Infantry Regiment
  - 56th Infantry Brigade
    - Headquarters and Headquarters Company
    - 111th Infantry Regiment
      - same organization as 109th Infantry Regiment
    - 112th Infantry Regiment
      - same organization as 109th Infantry Regiment
  - 53rd Field Artillery Brigade
    - Headquarters and Headquarters Battery
    - 107th Field Artillery Regiment
      - Headquarters and Headquarters Battery
      - 2× Light Field Artillery battalions
        - Headquarters and Headquarters Battery
        - 3× Howitzer batteries (M1897 75mm field guns), replaced by M2 105mm towed howitzers in 1941)
        - Service Battery
    - 108th Field Artillery Regiment
      - Headquarters and Headquarters Battery
      - 2× Medium Field Artillery battalions
        - Headquarters and Headquarters Battery
        - 3× Howitzer batteries (M1918 155mm towed howitzers, replaced by M1 155mm towed howitzers in 1941)
        - Anti-Tank Battery (M1897 75mm anti-tank guns)
        - Service Battery
    - 109th Field Artillery Regiment
      - same organization as 107th Field Artillery Regiment
  - 103rd Engineer Regiment
    - Headquarters and Headquarters and Service Company
    - 2× Engineer battalions
      - each battalion consists of: 1× Headquarters, 3× Engineer companies
  - 103rd Medical Regiment
    - Headquarters and Headquarters and Service Company
    - Collecting Battalion
      - battalion consists of: 1× Headquarters, 3× Collecting companies
    - Ambulance Battalion
      - battalion consists of: 1× Headquarters, 3× Ambulance companies
    - Clearing Battalion
      - battalion consists of: 1× Headquarters, 3× Clearing companies
  - 103rd Quartermaster Regiment
    - Headquarters and Headquarters Company
    - 2× Truck battalions
      - each battalion consists of: 1× Headquarters, 2× Truck companies
    - Light Maintenance and Car Battalion
      - battalion consists of: 1× Headquarters, 1× Light Maintenance Company, 1× Car Company
    - Service Company
  - Headquarters, Special Troops
    - Headquarters Company, 28th Division
    - 28th Signal Company
    - 103rd Ordnance Company
    - 28th Military Police Company

===== Triangular division =====
On 17 February 1942, as a part of an Army-wide reorganization of National Guard divisions, the 28th Division, now commanded by Major General James Ord, was reorganized as a triangular division. The division's two brigade headquarters were disbanded in favor of a structure containing three separate regimental commands reporting directly to the division headquarters, as well as four field artillery battalions under a division artillery headquarters, with the engineer, medical, and quartermaster regiments also reduced to battalions. The 111th Infantry Regiment was reorganized as a separate regimental combat team, used to guard important Eastern Seaboard industrial facilities under the Eastern Defense Command. With the reorganization the division was renamed 28th Infantry Division. Afterwards the 28th Infantry Division was composed of the following units:

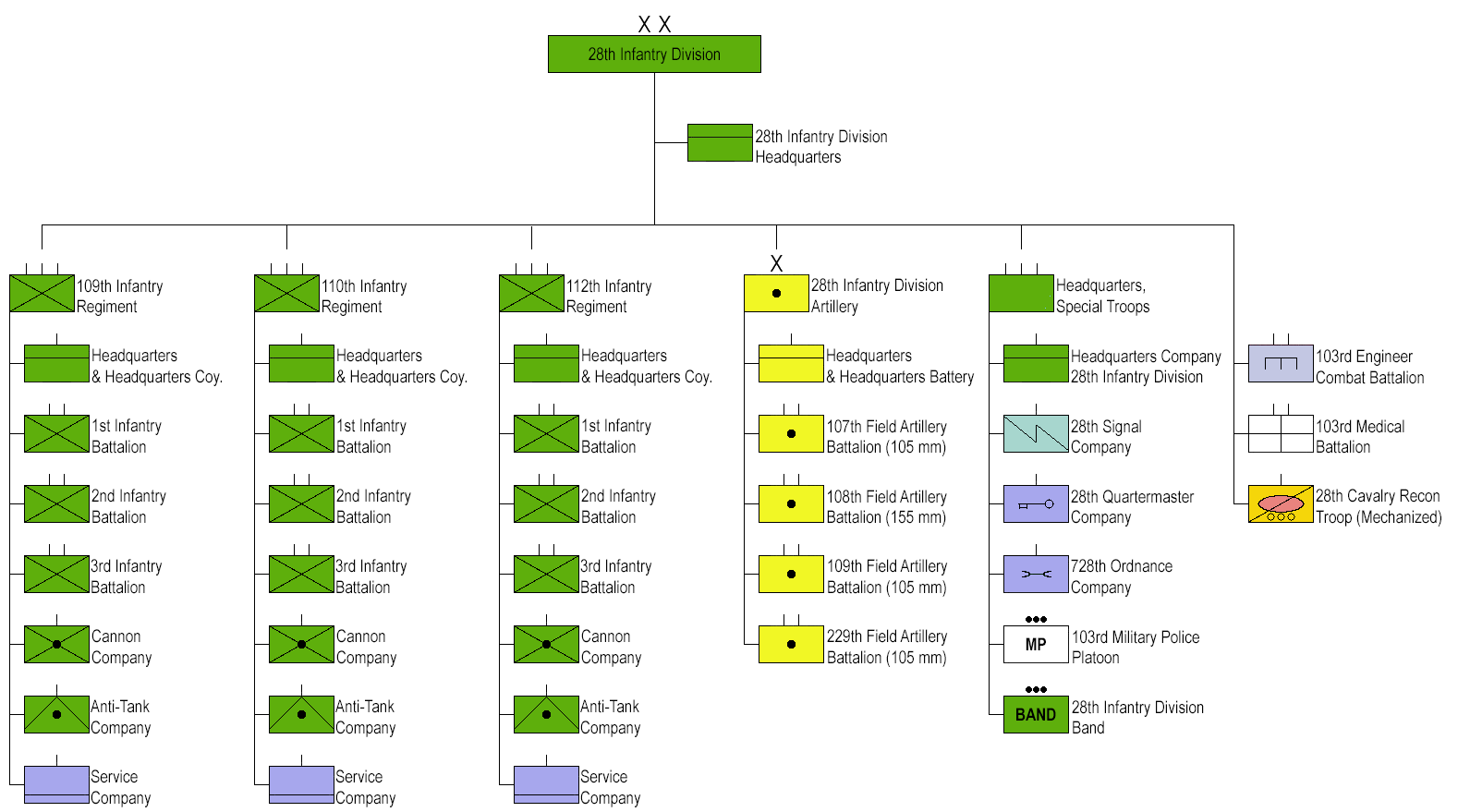
28th Infantry Division triangular organization (click to enlarge)

- 28th Infantry Division
  - 28th Infantry Division Headquarters
  - 28th Cavalry Reconnaissance Troop (Mechanized) (M3 scout cars and then M8 Greyhound armored cars)
  - 109th Infantry Regiment
    - Headquarters and Headquarters Company
    - 3× Infantry battalions
      - each battalion consists of: 1× Headquarters and Headquarters Company, 3× Rifle companies, 1× Heavy Weapons Company
    - Cannon Company (T12 Gun Motor Carriages and T19 Howitzer Motor Carriages, later replaced by either M3 105mm towed howitzers or M7 Priest self propelled howitzers)
    - Anti-Tank Company (M3 37mm anti-tank guns, which were replaced by 1944 with M1 57mm anti-tank guns)
    - Service Company
  - 110th Infantry Regiment
    - same organization as 109th Infantry Regiment
  - 112th Infantry Regiment
    - same organization as 109th Infantry Regiment
  - 28th Infantry Division Artillery
    - Headquarters and Headquarters Battery
    - 107th Field Artillery Battalion
      - Headquarters and Headquarters Battery
      - 3× Batteries (M2 105mm towed howitzers)
      - Service Battery
    - 108th Field Artillery Battalion
      - Headquarters and Headquarters Battery
      - 3× Batteries (M1 155mm towed howitzers)
      - Service Battery
    - 109th Field Artillery Battalion
      - same organization as 107th Field Artillery Battalion
    - 229th Field Artillery Battalion
      - same organization as 107th Field Artillery Battalion
  - Headquarters Special Troops
    - Headquarters Company, 28th Infantry Division
    - 39th Signal Company
    - 28th Quartermaster Company
    - 728th Ordnance Light Maintenance Company
    - 103rd Military Police Platoon
    - 28th Infantry Division Band (attached)
  - 28th Quartermaster Battalion (Between September and November 1942 Quartermaster battalions were disbanded and their platoons used to form a Quartermaster Company and an Ordnance Company, which were both assigned to Headquarters Special Troops)
    - Headquarters and Headquarters Company (includes a service platoon and a maintenance platoon)
    - Truck Company
  - 103rd Engineer Combat Battalion
    - Headquarters and Headquarters and Service Company
    - 3× Engineer combat companies
  - 103rd Medical Battalion
    - Headquarters and Headquarters Detachment
    - 3× Collecting companies
    - Clearing Company

The division trained in the Carolinas, Virginia, Louisiana, Texas, and Florida, under the command of Major General Omar Nelson Bradley.

==== Overseas ====
The division, now under Major General Lloyd Brown, left the United States and went overseas on 8 October 1943, arriving in South Wales soon afterwards, where it began training for the invasion of Northern France. On 22 July 1944, the division landed in Normandy, seven weeks after the initial D-Day landings and was almost immediately involved in Operation Cobra.

The 28th Infantry Division pushed east towards the French capital of Paris through the Bocage, its roads littered with abandoned tanks and bloated, stinking corpses of men and animals. In little more than a month after landing at the Normandy beachhead, as part of the Allied invasion of Normandy, the men of the 28th entered Paris and were given the honor of marching down the Champs-Elysées on 29 August 1944 in the hastily arranged Liberation of Paris.

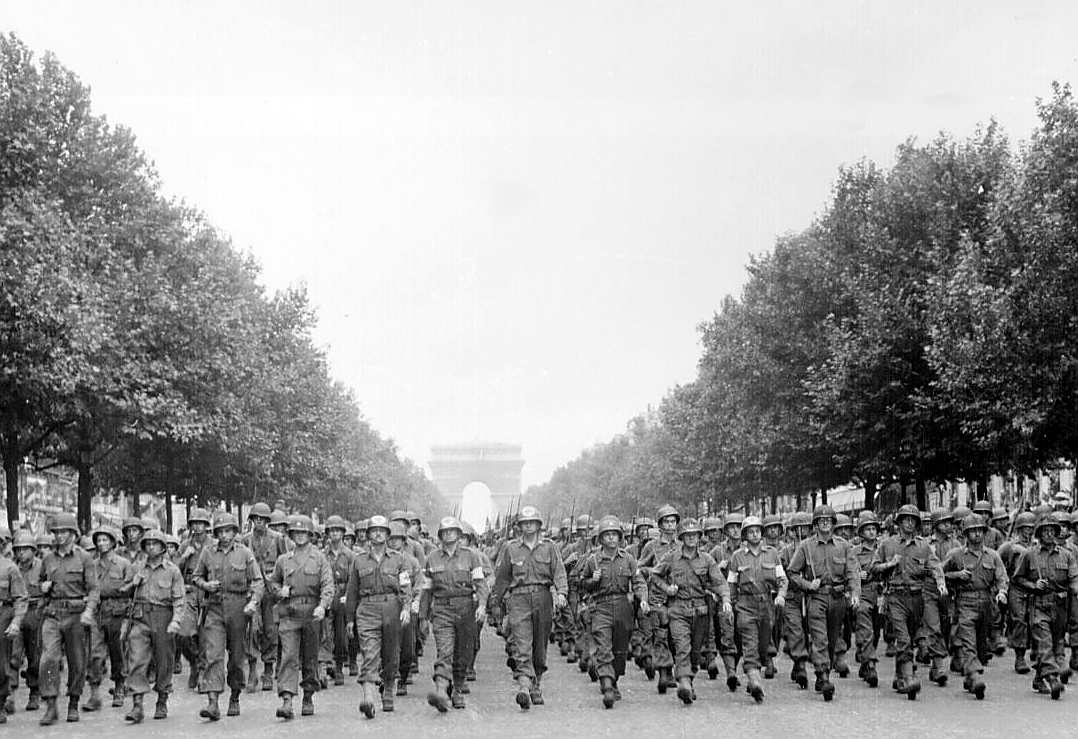
Men of the 28th Infantry Division march down the Champs Élysées in Paris, 29 August 1944.

After enjoying a brief respite, absorbing replacements of men and equipment, the division, now commanded by Brigadier General Norman Cota, formerly the Assistant Division Commander (ADC) of the 29th Infantry Division, headed to the German defensive Westwall.

A small night patrol of the 109th Infantry began the division's protracted struggle on the Siegfried Line on the dragon's teeth infested Westwall. The patrol crossed the Our River by bridge from Weiswampach, Luxembourg into Sevenig (Our), Germany, making it the first of the Allied armies to reach German soil. The 28th suffered extremely heavy casualties that autumn in the costly and ill-conceived Battle of Hürtgen Forest (19 September to 16 December 1944); the divisional history conceded "the division accomplished little" in the battle. The campaign was the longest continuous battle the U.S. Army fought in World War II. Finally, a tenuous line along the Our River and Sauer River was held at the end of November, only to be abruptly broken by two panzer divisions, three infantry divisions and one parachute division (including the 352nd Infantry Division and the 5th Parachute Division) in an infantry-tank attack on the "Ridge Road" just west of the Our River on 16 December.

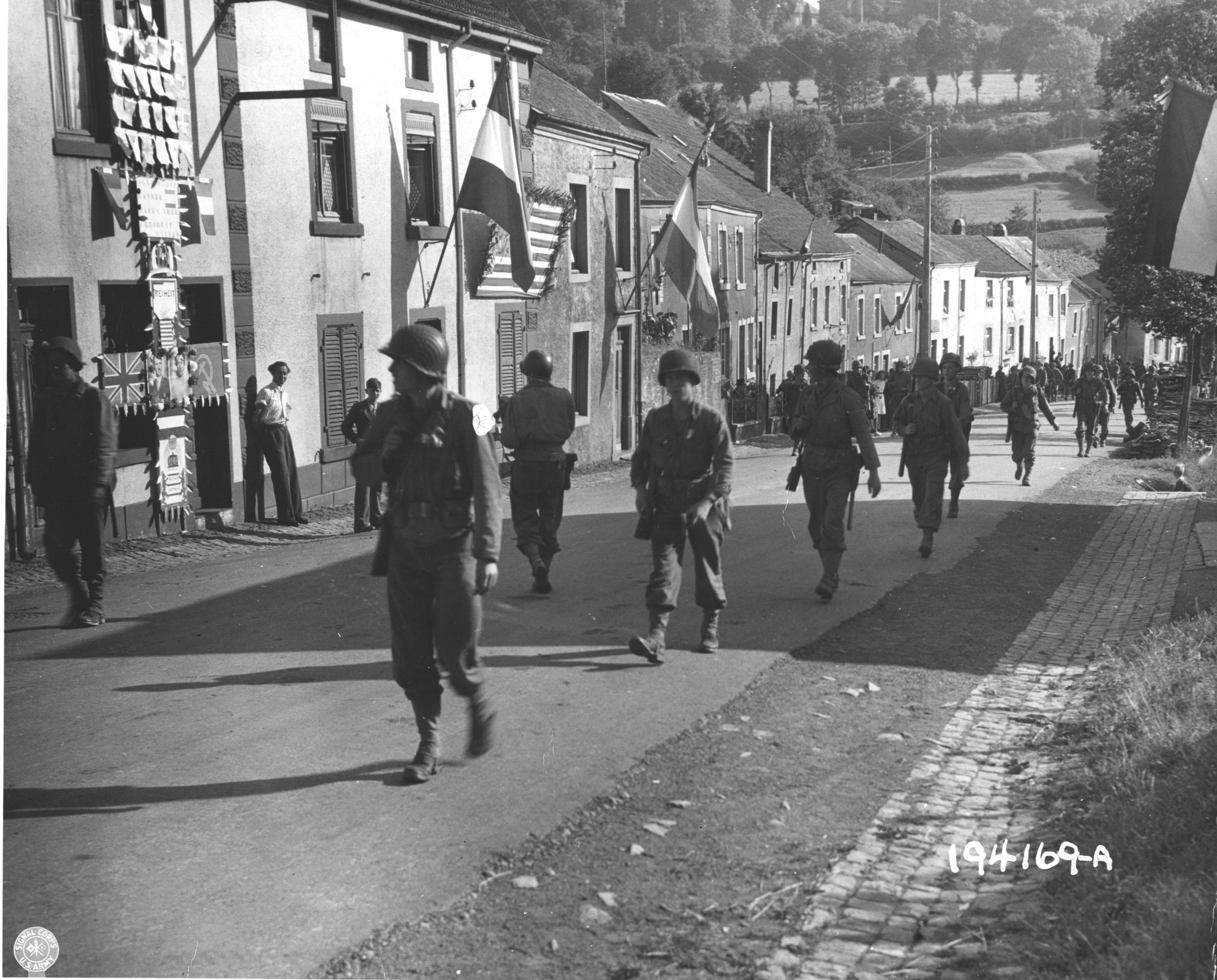
In pursuit of the rapidly retreating Germans, infantrymen of the 2nd Infantry Battalion, 109th Regiment, 28th Division, pass through Witte, Luxemburg, 9/10/44.

The Ardennes Offensive was launched along the entire divisional front by the 5th Panzer Army led by General der Panzertruppe Hasso von Manteuffel. The 28th, which had sustained heavy casualties in the First Army drive to the Roer, fought doggedly in place using all available personnel and threw off the enemy timetable before withdrawing to Neufchâteau on 22 December for reorganization, as its units had been badly mauled.

At the end of November 1944 a German "pocket" of resistance formed in the French Alsace region centered in the city of Colmar. The Colmar Pocket consisted of a strength of eight German divisions and a brigade of Panzer tanks. Combined forces of French and American armies were initially unsuccessful in closing this pocket.

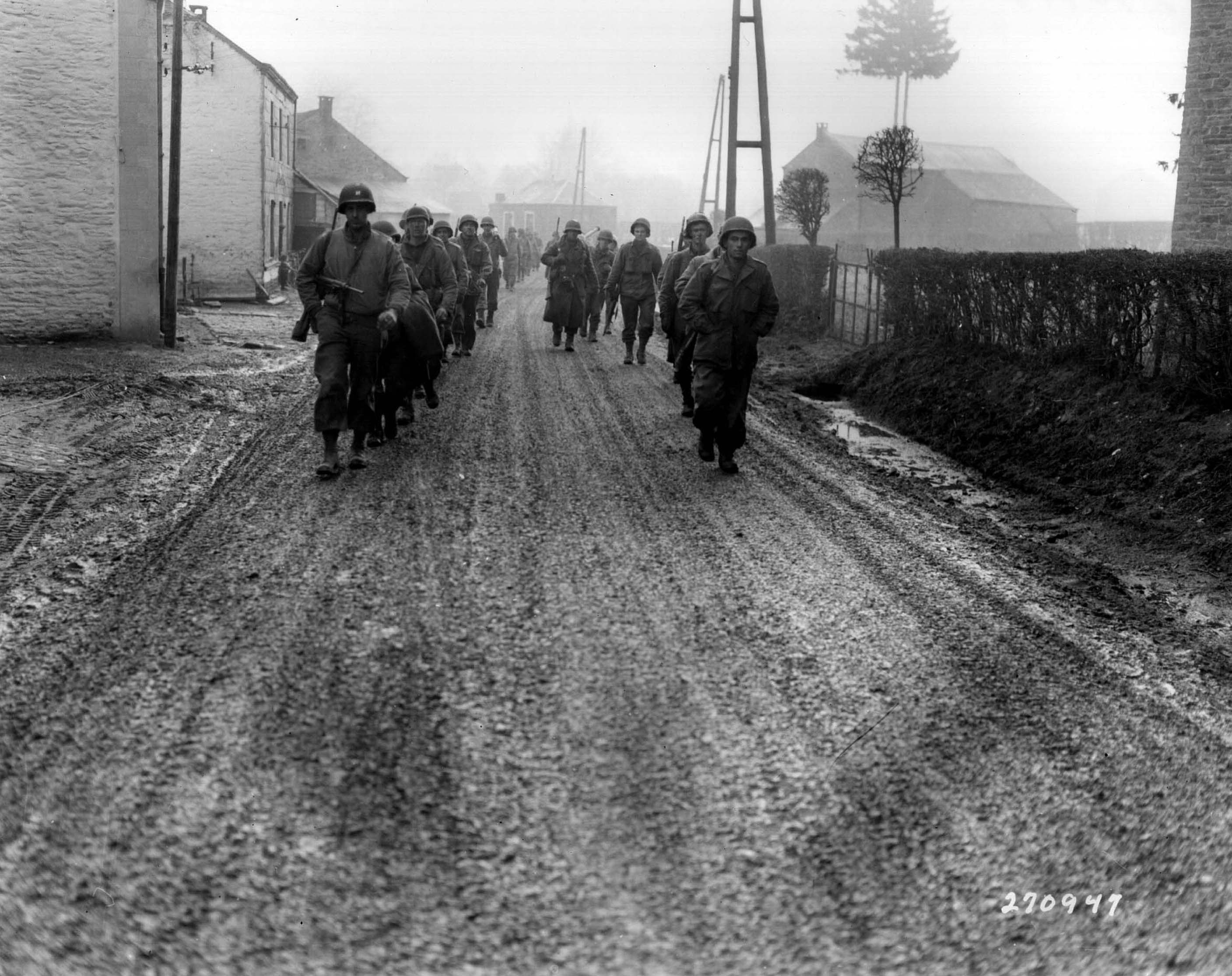
Men of the 28th Infantry Division march down a street in Bastogne, Belgium, December 1944. Some of these men lost their weapons during the German advance in this area.

General Dwight D. "Ike" Eisenhower, the Supreme Allied Commander on the Western Front, called the Colmar Pocket "a sore" on the 6th Army Group's front. The 6th Army Group was commanded by Lieutenant General Jacob Devers. The French First Army commander, Jean de Lattre de Tassigny, and Devers met on 11 January 1945 and agreed it was long since time to drive the Germans back out of France. Two days later, de Lattre and Devers made a request to Eisenhower for reinforcements so their armies could make an offensive on the Colmar Pocket. Eisenhower's aide, Major General Walter Bedell Smith, subsequently told Devers that the 10th Armored Division and the 28th were being placed under his command. Smith also warned Devers that, after three months of intense fighting on the Siegfried Line as well as fighting off the initial thrust of the offensive, the 28th—put back into action in a defensive position along the Meuse River from Givet to Verdun on 2 January 1945—was "capable of only limited offensive action."

Battle plans were soon made and, on 19 January, the 28th went into action on the northwestern section of the pocket in the Kaysersberg Valley supporting the beleaguered 3rd Infantry Division, which had been holding there since late November 1944. Despite the bitterly cold conditions, the Allies prevailed. German intelligence knew nothing about the 10th and 28th presence in their sector until they attacked. The 28th advanced westward and pressed steadily toward the city of Colmar. In less than 10 days they reduced the pocket by half and Adolf Hitler gave the order in the early morning of 29 January for a partial retreat of his troops in the northern sector of the pocket. By 2 February, the 28th had cleared Colmar's surrounding areas and the French 5th Armored Division led the way into the town. On 9 February, the final organized German troops in Alsace were pushed back across the Rhine.

The 109th Infantry Regiment received the French Croix de guerre from Charles de Gaulle.

The division was on the front line for 196 days of combat. Francis J. Clark was awarded the Medal of Honor; and 29 Distinguished Service Crosses; 1 DSM; 435 Silver Stars; 27 Legion of Merit; SM - 21; Bronze Star Medal 2,312; AM - 100 were awarded. The division returned to the United States on 2 August 1945 and was inactivated there on 13 December 1945.

==== Casualties ====
- Total battle casualties: 16,762
- Killed in action: 2,316
- Wounded in action: 9,609
- Missing in action: 884
- Prisoner of war: 3,953

==== Assignments in ETO ====
- 22 October 1943: V Corps, First Army.
- 14 April 1944: XX Corps, Third Army
- 24 April 1944: Third Army, but attached to First Army
- 26 July 1944: XIX Corps
- 30 July 1944: XIX Corps, First Army
- 1 August 1944: XIX Corps, First Army, 12th Army Group
- 28 August 1944: V Corps
- 19 November 1944: VIII Corps
- 20 December 1944: VIII Corps, Third Army, 12th Army Group.
- 5 January 1945: VIII Corps, Third Army, 12th Army Group, but attached to Oise Section, Communications Zone, for supply.
- 6 January 1945: VIII Corps, Third Army, 12th Army Group.
- 8 January 1945: Third Army, 12th Army Group.
- 9 January 1945: Fifteenth Army, 12th Army Group.
- 16 January 1945: Fifteenth Army, 12th Army Group, but attached to Seventh Army, 6th Army Group.
- 20 January 1945: French II Corps.
- 28 January 1945: XXI Corps.
- 14 February 1945: Fifteenth Army, 12th Army Group, but attached to Seventh Army, 6th Army Group.
- 19 February 1945: 12th Army Group.
- 21 February 1945: V Corps, First Army, 12th Army Group.
- 16 March 1945: VIII Corps, Third Army, 12th Army Group.
- 22 March 1945: V Corps, First Army, 12th Army Group.
- 28 March 1945: III Corps.
- 7 April 1945: First Army, 12th Army Group.
- 10 April 1945: Fifteenth Army, 12th Army Group.
- 13 April 1945: XXII Corps.
- 26 April 1945: XXIII Corps.

==== Medal of Honor ====
Technical Sergeant Francis J. Clark, U.S. Army, Company K, 109th Infantry Regiment received the Medal of Honor for gallantry during the Siegfried Line Campaign on 12 September 1944.

==== Desertion ====
Edward Donald Slovik (18 February 1920 – 31 January 1945) was a private in the 109th Infantry Regiment during World War II and the only American soldier to be executed for cowardice since the American Civil War. Although over 21,000 soldiers were given varying sentences for desertion during World War II, including 49 death sentences, Slovik's was the only death sentence carried out.

=== Post World War II service ===
After being inactivated as part of the Army on 13 December 1945 at Camp Shelby, Mississippi, the 28th Infantry Division was reorganized on 20 November 1946 and returned to the Pennsylvania Army National Guard at Harrisburg.

The 28th was ordered into active federal service on 5 September 1950 at Harrisburg following the outbreak of the Korean War. The division re-opened the mothballed Camp Atterbury, Indiana and remained there from 13 September 1950 to 23 November 1951. It was sent to Germany to augment NATO forces there. During the Korean War, the 28th was mobilized and deployed to Europe as a part of the NATO command defending Western Europe from the threat of Soviet attack and remained in federal service until 22 May 1954.

On 1 June 1959, the division was reorganized under the Pentomic structures. It consisted from that point of 1st Reconnaissance Squadron, 103rd Armor, 28th Signal Battalion, 28th Aviation Battalion, 1 BG-109 Inf, 1 BG-110 Inf, 1 BG-111 Inf, 2 BG-111 Inf, 1 BG-112 Inf, 1st Battalion, 107th Field Artillery Regiment (1-107 FA), 1-108 FA (Honest John), 1-109 FA, 2-109 FA, 1-166 FA, 1-229 FA, other combat and combat support units, and combat service support units, for strength of 10,408, according to Divisional Strength reports of 5 June 1959.

The division was not mobilized during the Vietnam War, although in 1965 it was selected as one of three divisions in the Army Selective Reserve Force. Nor was it mobilized in force for Operation Desert Storm in 1991; however, the 121st Transportation Company, one of its constituent units, served in Saudi Arabia and volunteers from the division were deployed overseas, some in the Middle East.

In 1996, after the signing of the Dayton Agreement, some units of the divisional artillery were called up to serve as peacekeeping forces in Bosnia; elements of the 28th served in Bosnia as peacekeepers for several years following this. In 2002, the 28th Division took command of the Northern Brigade Task Force (Task Force Eagle), as part of the NATO peacekeeping mission in Bosnia as part of SFOR 12. The leading combat arms units under the 28th while in Bosnia were the 109th Infantry and the 104th Cavalry. The division was the third reserve component division headquarters to take on this role in Bosnia (previously the Army National Guard's 49th and 29th Divisions had commanded Task Force Eagle).

== 21st century ==
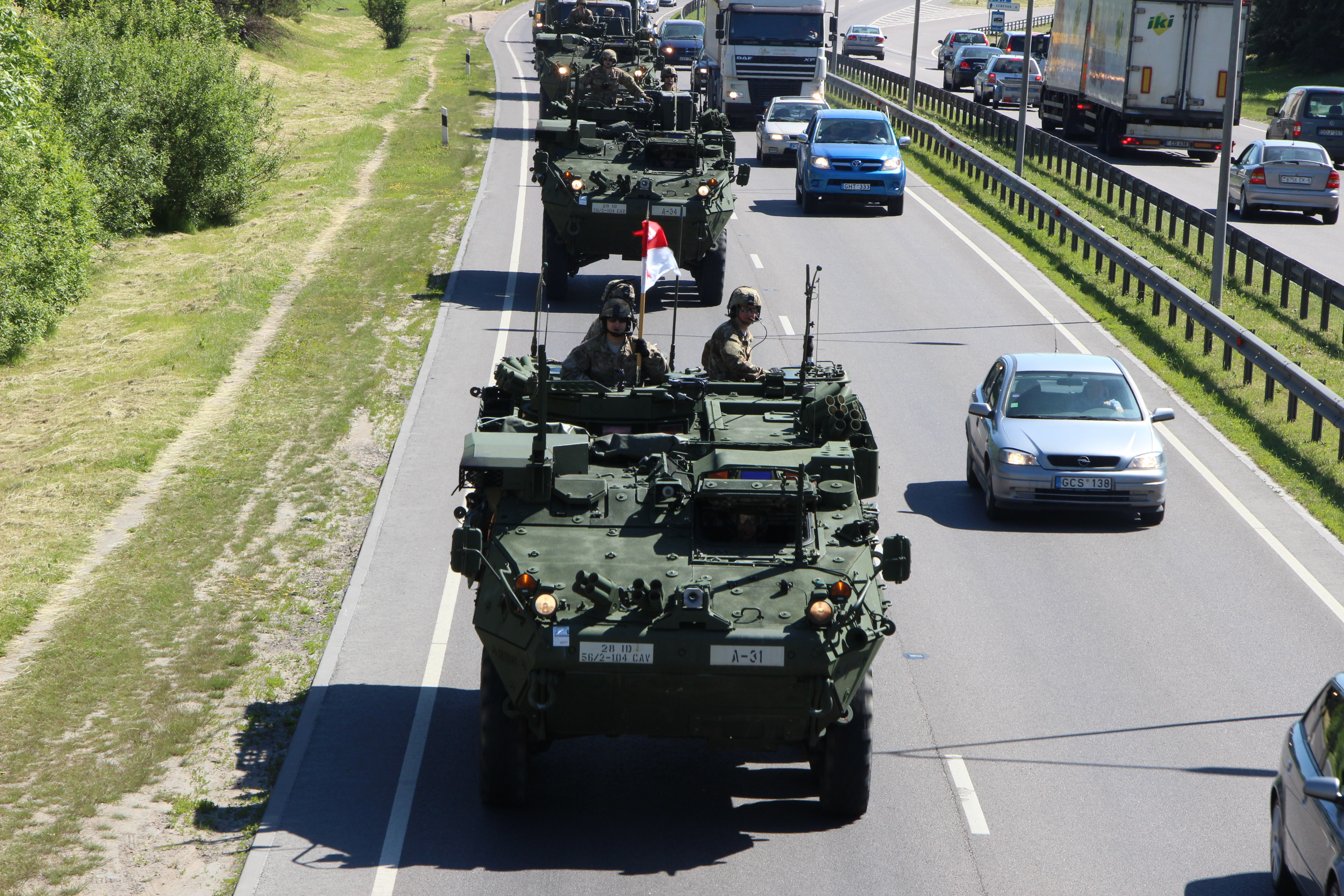
Strykers from the 56th SBCT, 28th ID arrive in Lithuania 8 June 2015 to take part in Operation Saber Strike 2015.

In 2003, the 28th Division again led KFOR, the NATO peacekeeping mission in Kosovo, as part of KFOR 5A for a 9-month rotation. The 28th was the first reserve component division headquarters to take on this role in Kosovo. Later in 2005, elements of the 28th Division would again return to Kosovo as part of KFOR's KFOR 6B rotation, the first year-long rotation by U.S. troops to the region.

Following the September 11th, 2001 attacks on New York and Washington DC, the Keystone Division sent troops to fight in the War in Afghanistan (2001-2021), carried out homeland security duties during Operation Noble Eagle and sent several thousand troops to the Iraq War (US phase, 2003–2010).

D Troop 2/104th CAV, Reconnaissance, Surveillance, and Target Acquisition (RSTA) was activated in January 2003 for two years. The platoon-sized element deployed to Iraq in September 2003 as a UAV platoon with elements from the Maryland National Guard. These were the first National Guard Units to fly the Shadow UAV.

Company A, 28th Signal Battalion deployed to Iraq in February 2004. Elements of the 103rd Armor Regiment and 1st Battalion, 107th Field Artillery were activated for Iraq in January 2004. Elements of 2nd Battalion, 103rd Armor, served as military police. The division's 2nd Brigade Combat Team deployed to Iraq for a year-long rotation in July 2005. Elements of the division would again return in 2006 and revolving deployments to Iraq seem likely in the future. The 56th Stryker Brigade Combat Team (SBCT) was deployed in 2008 to Iraq. The Combat Aviation Brigade, 28th Infantry Division deployed to Iraq in May 2009.

Operation Enduring Freedom, Sept 2009-Nov 2010 Company C, 1/110th Inf attached to TF 2nd BCT 101st (Rakkasans) served as a platoon size force protection for PRTs in Paktika, Gardez, and Khost (FOB Chapman) with support elements in FOB Salerno. On 28 Aug 2010, the platoon under 1LT Dickey repelled a Haqanni-coordinated attack at FOB Chapman.

== Operation Iraqi Freedom ==
=== 1st Battalion, 107th Cavalry Regiment ===
In September 2001, the 1st Battalion 107th Cavalry Regiment, was transferred from the 37th Brigade, 38th Infantry Division ("Cyclone") (Indiana Army National Guard) to the 2nd Brigade, 28th Infantry Division with its headquarters remaining in Stow, Ohio. In October 2003, B and C Companies, and elements of Headquarters and Headquarters Company (HHC) and Company A, of the 1st Battalion, 107th Cavalry were activated at their home stations and traveled to Fort Bragg, North Carolina, and Fort Stewart, Georgia, for five months of mobilization training. There they were then attached to the 1st Battalion, 150th Armor (West Virginia Army National Guard), the 1st Battalion, 252nd Armor (North Carolina Army National Guard), and Troop E, 196th Cavalry (North Carolina Army National Guard) respectively, for deployment to Operation Iraqi Freedom II with North Carolina's 30th Brigade Combat Team under the 1st Infantry Division. These elements of the 1st Battalion operated in Iraq from February to December 2004, serving in Kirkush, Tuz Khurmatu, Jalawla, and Baghdad. They participated in the Transition of Iraq and Iraqi Governance campaigns and returned home in late December 2004.

The battalion commander LTC Richard T. Curry and CSM Albert Whatmough along with the remaining companies continued their regular training cycle until October 2004, when the remaining companies of the 1–107th Cavalry were activated for service in Operation Iraqi Freedom III. One element of HHC 1–107th CAV was then deployed to Fort Dix, New Jersey for mobilization training and left for Kuwait in January 2005. The companies operated in Baghdad, Iraq and performed detainee operations at Camps Cropper and Victory with a high-profile mission of guarding the deposed Iraqi President Saddam Hussein while he stood trial. The headquarters moved to Fort McCoy, Wisconsin and arrived in Kuwait in December 2004 and deployed to Mosul, Iraq in late December. This element included LTC Curry and CSM Whatmough who both deployed with the battalion in 2004–2005 to establish Forward Operating Base (FOB) Endurance which later became known as FOB Q-West Base Complex around 19 miles (30 Kilometers) south of Mosul, Iraq. The mission of LTC Curry and his staff was to provide command & control of the base, establish the base defense operations center, provide life support functions, establish base defense security, conduct combat patrols and build the FOB from the ground up into the largest logistical hub operating in northern Iraq by the end of 2005, a mission that was accomplished prior to their departure.

The FOB Endurance/Q-West Base Complex HQ elements of the 1–107th CAV were attached to the 11th Armored Cavalry Regiment and received the Army Meritorious Unit Commendation (MUC) for their accomplishments. The HHC/A Convoy Security Company conducted operations throughout Iraq logging in thousands of miles with no fatalities and provided security for convoy elements. Elements of the 1st Battalion, 107th Cavalry served within the 1st Cavalry Division, 4th Infantry Division, and 3rd Infantry Division areas of operations as units of the 18th and 42nd MP Brigades. The final elements returned home from Iraq in January 2006 reuniting the battalion. Both HHC/A detachments received the U.S. Army Meritorious Unit Commendation for their service. In September 2007 the 1–107th Cavalry Regiment was transitioned, reorganized and reformed becoming the 1st Battalion, 145th Armor and transferred as a separate heavy battalion assigned to the 37th Infantry Brigade Combat Team, Ohio National Guard. Its sister unit the 2–107th Cavalry Regiment took its place in the 28th Infantry Division in 2008.

=== 2nd Squadron, 107th Cavalry ===
Assigned to the 28th Infantry Division in September 2008, the 2nd Squadron, 107th Cavalry (Reconnaissance, Surveillance, Target Acquisition) during the years 2006–2010 deployed at different times Troops A, B, & C in support of Operation Iraqi Freedom conducting various SECFOR and convoy escort missions.

=== 1st Battalion, 109th Field Artillery ===
In December 2003 the 1st Battalion, 109th Field Artillery Regiment was activated and received Military Police training at Fort Dix, New Jersey. Following a month of training, the soldiers of the 109th were deployed to Iraq for Operation Iraqi Freedom. The different batteries were dispersed throughout Iraq serving as MPs. The members of the 109th returned home in February 2005. C Battery saw action in Fallujah during Operation Valiant Resolve in the spring campaign. Members of B Battery also saw combat in the area surrounding Camp Anaconda and Abu Ghraib, a military prison. Another contingent provided security for Ambassador Paul Bremer and other high-ranking State Department officials at Coalition HQ.

=== 2nd Battalion, 103rd Armor ===
In January 2004, B and C Companies of the 2nd Battalion, 103rd Armor Regiment were activated and, with attachments from several other Pennsylvania Army National Guard units, reconfigured as military police companies and trained at Ft. Dix for deployment to Iraq. They were designated as companies of the 89th MP Brigade and left for Iraq in March 2004 within days of each other. Once in Iraq, they were assigned to some of the most sensitive missions of OIF II. Three platoons of Bravo Company (1st, 3rd and Headquarters) were attached to the Iraq Survey Group; while the 2nd and 4th Platoons served in military police operations, including area patrols and traffic control points supporting 1st Marine Division out of Camp Fallujah and eventually relocated to the Green Zone/International Zone as security escorts attached to the U.S.Navy for high-ranking Interim Iraqi government officials. Charlie Company was assigned to the HVD facility at Camp Cropper, with an entire platoon assigned solely to former Iraqi dictator Saddam Hussein. The units both redeployed in March 2005.

=== 1st Battalion, 103rd Armor ===
In June 2004, the 1st Battalion, 103rd Armor was activated at Fort Bliss, Texas and deployed to Iraq in November in support of Operation Iraqi Freedom. The Task Force was composed of units from the K Troop 104th Cavalry, A Co. 1-111 Infantry, 1-112 Infantry, 1-103rd Armor, 1-109th Infantry, 103rd Engineers, and several Soldiers from the 116th CAV (Idaho NG). This marked the first deployment of a 28th ID combat battalion to a war zone since World War II. The battalion, now designated as a Task Force (Task Force DRAGOON), was stationed at Forward Operating Base Summerall, near Bayji. Attached initially to the 2nd Brigade, 1st Infantry Division, and then the 1st Brigade, 3rd Infantry Division, the 800-man TF 1–103rd Armor, commanded by LTC Philip J. Logan, engaged in combat operations for 12 months before redeploying to the United States in November 2005. Thirteen soldiers from TF Dragoon were killed in action during combat operations in Salah Ad Din Province, a heavily Sunni Muslim area in the north part of the "Sunni Triangle." For its outstanding performance during combat operations, TF 1-103rd Armor was awarded the Army Meritorious Unit Citation.

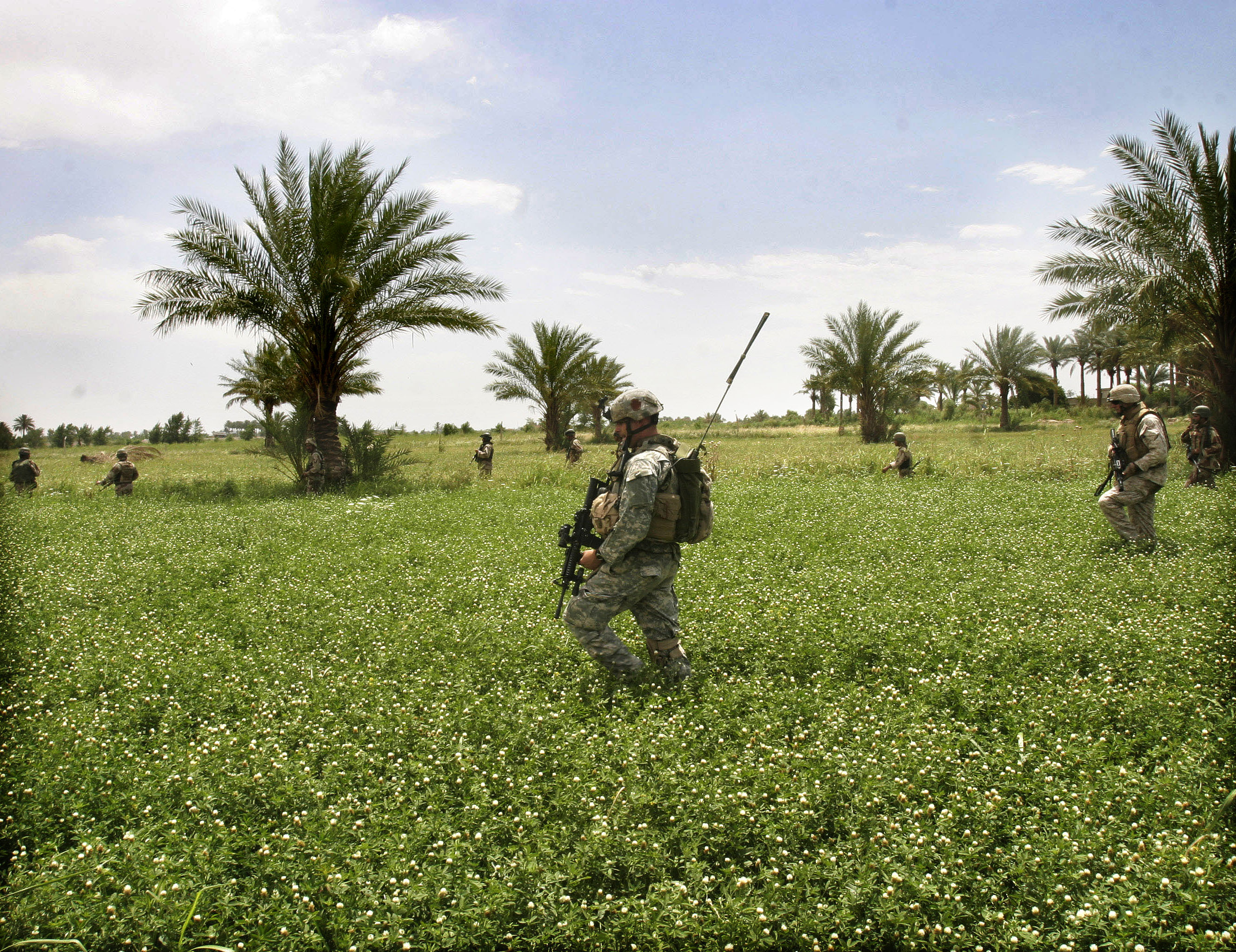
Iraqi and U.S. Soldiers from the 28th Infantry Division (attached to I Marine Expeditionary Force) search for Iraqi Resistance members and weapons caches in the Jazeera area of Ramadi, 2 June 2006.

=== 2nd Brigade Combat Team ===
The division's 2nd Infantry Brigade Combat Team (2/28 BCT) was mobilized in January 2005. 2/28 BCT consisted of approximately 4,000 National Guardsmen from over 30 states and was commanded by COL John L. Gronski. Over 2,000 of the soldiers were from the Pennsylvania Army National Guard. Other states that contributed large units included Vermont, Utah, Michigan, Kentucky, New Jersey and Nebraska. 2/28 BCT conducted its post-mobilization training at Camp Shelby, MS. The soldiers were trained in full spectrum operations and received additional equipment.

In May 2005, 2nd Brigade (2/28 BCT) soldiers trained at the National Training Center at Fort Irwin, CA to prepare for their upcoming mission in Iraq due to start in July 2005. In late June and early July 2005, 2nd Brigade soldiers began deploying to the Al Anbar Governorate and were under the command of the 2nd Marine Division through February 2006 and then were under command of I Marine Expeditionary Force Forward through June 2006.

The 2nd Brigade received a 'transfer of authority' for its area of operations (AO) in central Al Anbar Province in July 2005. The area of operations was very large, but 2/28 BCT focused operations along the Euphrates River Valley from Ramadi to Al Habbaniyah, about 22 miles (35 kilometers) to the east. Ramadi was the brigade main effort for the following reasons: 1) The capital of Al Anbar province and home to the provincial governor and government center; 2) large urban area with a population of approximately 400,000 Iraqi citizens; 3) Al-Qaeda in Iraq focused on the area. The Ramadi area was known as one of the most violent and dangerous areas in Iraq.

The brigade's mission was to neutralize the insurgency and develop the Iraqi Armed Forces; Iraqi Police; and other security forces to create stable and secure conditions and allow for self-governance. It conducted counterinsurgency operations to kill or detain insurgents, to locate weapons caches, to detect improvised explosive devices (IEDs), to engage in ongoing dialogue with community and government leaders, to recruit, train and integrate Iraqi Army and Iraqi Police, and to conduct civil affairs projects to improve sewer, water, energy, medical and school facilities.

The brigade 1) completed millions of dollars of humanitarian assistance projects; 2) assessed that over 3,000 insurgents and terrorists were detained or killed; 3) ensured, within its boundaries, a successful referendum in October 2005 and a successful general election in December 2005; 4) trained and integrated approximately 5,000 Iraqi soldiers into all operations, including transitioning area of operations to Iraqi brigades and battalions; 5) seized hundreds of tons of explosives, ammunition, and weapons from insurgent caches; 6) ensured that over 1,000 young men of Ramadi were recruited into the Iraqi Police; 7) established outposts and controlled areas that had formerly been insurgent strongholds, working with other coalition forces and the Iraqi Army; 8) discovered over 1,100 roadside bombs before they could be used against civilians, Iraqi government officials, or coalition forces and Iraqi soldiers.

2/28 BCT was awarded the Navy Unit Commendation as part of the I Marine Expeditionary Force (Forward) for the period of 28 February 2006 until the transition of authority to 1st Armored Division.

2nd Brigade – OIF Composition

- Headquarters Company, 2nd Brigade, 28th Infantry Division
  - 109th Infantry Regiment (PA NG)[detached to MAW, Al Asad]
  - 110th Infantry Regiment (PA NG)
  - 1st Battalion, 172nd Armor (VT NG)
  - A Company, 3rd Battalion, 172nd Infantry (MTN) (VT NG)
  - C Company, 1/103rd Armor (PA NG)
  - A Company, 3/103rd Armor (PA NG)
  - B Troop, 1-104th Cavalry Regiment (PA NG)
  - A Troop, 167th Cavalry Regiment (NE NG)
  - 222nd Field Artillery Regiment (UT NG)
  - 876th Engineer Battalion (PA NG)
  - 228th Forward Support Battalion (PA NG)
  - B Company, 1/125 Infantry [MI NG]
  - A Company, 138th Signal Battalion (IN NG)
  - D Company, 1/149 Infantry (KY NG)
  - 231st Military Intelligence Company (KY NG)
  - 1st Platoon, 28th Military Police Company (PA NG)
  - 2–69th Armor (3rd Infantry Division, Fort Benning, GA), 2005–2006
  - 1st Battalion, 506th Infantry (101st Airborne Division (Air Assault), Ft Campbell, KY), 2006
  - 118th ASOS (NC ANG)
- 1/5 Marines, 2005
- 3/7 Marines, 2005–2006
- 3/8 Marines, 2006

=== 56th Stryker Brigade Combat Team ===
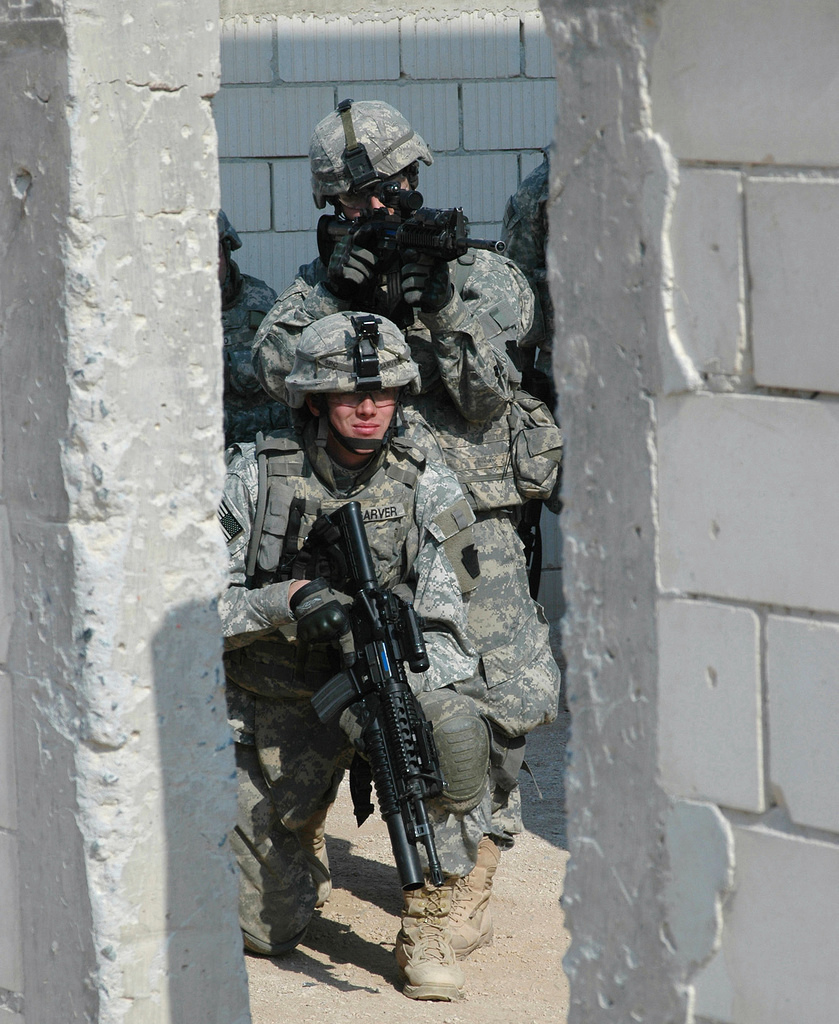
56th Stryker Brigade soldiers train in Iraq.

The brigade trained at Camp Shelby, Mississippi from 19 September 2008 until November 2008 when it moved to the Joint Readiness Training Center (JRTC) in Fort Polk, Louisiana until December 2008. The brigade continued training at Joint Base McGuire-Dix-Lakehurst in December 2008 and moved to Camp Buehring, Kuwait in the United States Central Command area of operations in January 2009 awaiting movement into Iraq. The 56th SBCT, based out of Camp Taji, Iraq, conducted operations in the northern Baghdad Governorate from January to September 2009, before redeploying to Kuwait and returning home at Joint Base McGuire-Dix-Lakehurst.

56th Stryker Brigade – OIF Composition

- Headquarters and Headquarters Company, 56th Brigade Combat Team (Stryker)
  - 1st Battalion, 111th Infantry Regiment
  - 1st Battalion, 112th Infantry Regiment
  - 2nd Battalion, 112th Infantry Regiment
  - 1st Battalion, 108th Field Artillery Regiment
  - Battery B, 1st Battalion, 109th Filed Artillery Regiment
  - 328th Brigade Support Battalion
  - 2d Squadron (RSTA), 104th Cavalry Regiment
  - 856th Engineer Company
  - 656th Signal Company
  - 556th Military Intelligence Company
  - Company D (Anti Tank), 112th Infantry Regiment

=== Combat Aviation Brigade ===
Soldiers of the Combat Aviation Brigade, 28th Infantry Division began mobilization on 29 January 2009 for Operation Iraqi Freedom from 2009 to 2011. Over 2,000 soldiers from multiple states completed validation training at Fort Sill, Oklahoma before moving to Camp Buehring, Kuwait. Throughout the opening days of May 2009, soldiers flew into multiple Forward Operating Bases across Iraq and Iran with the majority of the brigade based out of Tallil, Al Kut, and Basrah.

== Division organization in 2026 ==
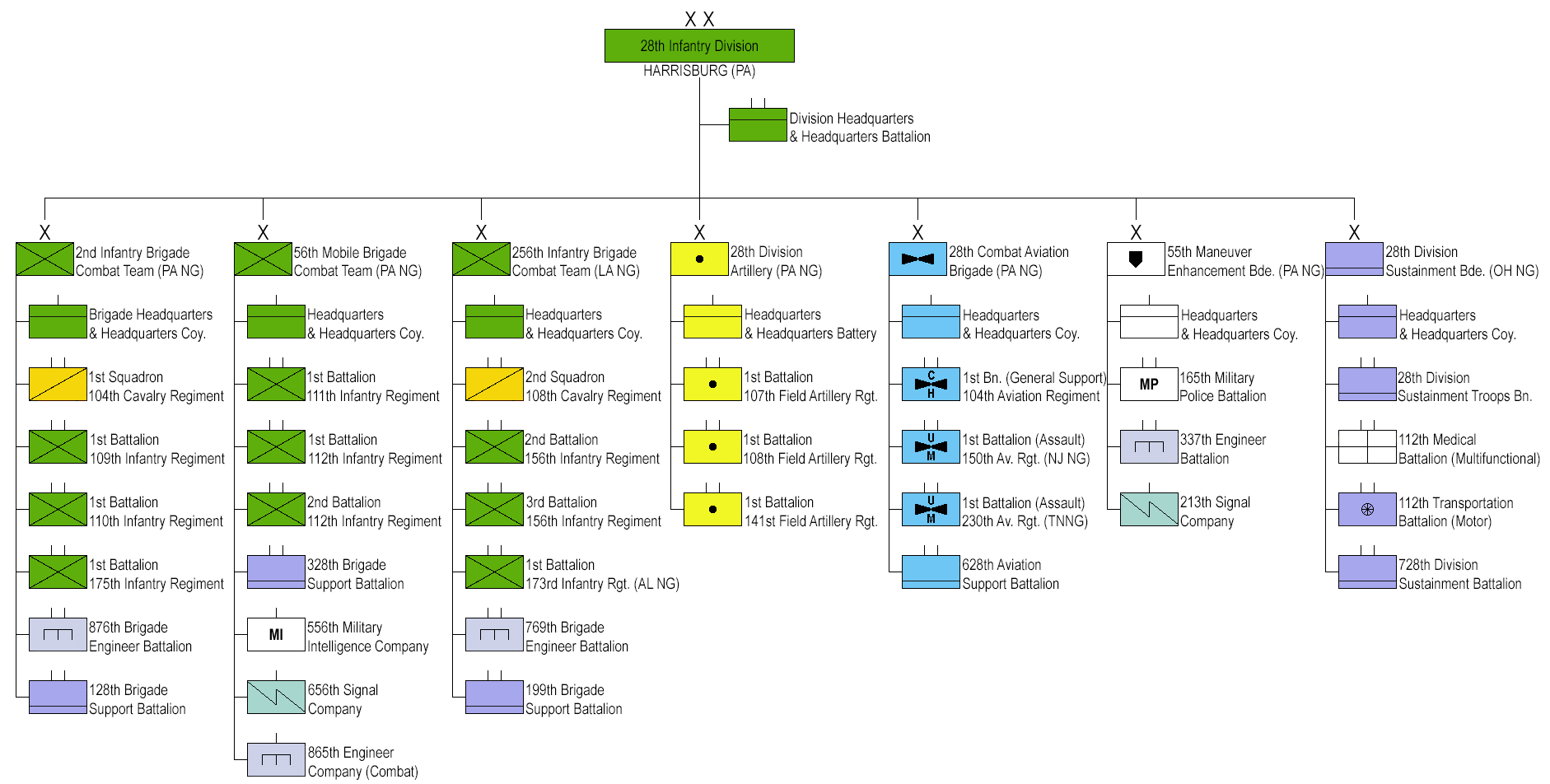
28th Infantry Division organization as of November 2026 (click to enlarge)

As a modular division, the 28th Infantry Division consists of a headquarters battalion, one infantry brigade combat team, one Stryker brigade combat team, the Division Artillery, one combat aviation brigade, a sustainment brigade, a regional support group and an attached maneuver enhancement brigade. The division headquarters exercises training and readiness oversight of the following elements:

- 28th Infantry Division, at Harrisburg Military Post (PA)
  - Headquarters and Headquarters Battalion, in Harrisburg Military Post (PA)
  - 628th Intelligence and Electronic Warfare Battalion (Maryland Army National Guard)
  - 2nd Infantry Brigade Combat Team, in Washington (PA) — will convert to a Mobile Brigade Combat Team
    - Headquarters and Headquarters Company, 2nd Infantry Brigade Combat Team, in Washington (PA)
    - 1st Squadron, 104th Cavalry Regiment, in Philadelphia (PA)
    - 1st Battalion, 109th Infantry Regiment, in Scranton (PA)
    - 1st Battalion, 110th Infantry Regiment, in Mount Pleasant (PA)
    - 1st Battalion, 175th Infantry Regiment, in Dundalk (MD) — (Maryland Army National Guard)
    - 876th Brigade Engineer Battalion, at Johnstown–Cambria County Airport (PA)
  - 56th Mobile Brigade Combat Team, at Horsham Air Guard Station (PA)
    - Headquarters and Headquarters Company, 56th Mobile Brigade Combat Team, at Horsham Air Guard Station (PA)
    - 1st Battalion, 111th Infantry Regiment, in Plymouth Meeting (PA)
    - 1st Battalion, 112th Infantry Regiment, in Cambridge Springs (PA)
    - 2nd Battalion, 112th Infantry Regiment, in Lewistown (PA)
    - M Company, 56th Mobile Brigade Combat Team (Multi-Functional Reconnaissance Company)
      - Detachment 1, Company M, 56th Mobile Brigade Combat Team, at Muir Army Heliport (PA) (RQ-28A UAV)
    - 556th Military Intelligence Company, at Horsham Air Guard Station (PA)
    - 656th Signal Company, in Torrance (PA)
      - Detachment 1, 656th Signal Company, in Philadelphia (PA)
    - 856th Combat Engineer Company – Infantry, in Spring City (PA)
      - Detachment 1, 856th Combat Engineer Company – Infantry, at Fort Mifflin in Philadelphia (PA)
  - 256th Infantry Brigade Combat Team, in Lafayette (LA) — (LA NG) — will convert to a Mobile Brigade Combat Team
    - 2nd Squadron, 108th Cavalry Regiment, in Shreveport (LA)
    - 2nd Battalion, 156th Infantry Regiment, in Abbeville (LA)
    - 3rd Battalion, 156th Infantry Regiment, in Lake Charles (LA)
    - 1st Battalion, 173rd Infantry Regiment, in Enterprise (AL) — (Alabama Army National Guard)
    - 769th Brigade Engineer Battalion, in Baton Rouge (LA)
  - 28th Division Artillery, in Wilkes-Barre
    - Headquarters and Headquarters Battery, 28th Division Artillery, in Wilkes-Barre
    - 1st Battalion, 107th Field Artillery Regiment, in New Castle (PA) — supports 2nd Infantry Brigade Combat Team
    - 1st Battalion, 108th Field Artillery Regiment, in Carlisle (PA) — supports 56th Mobile Brigade Combat Team
    - 1st Battalion, 141st Field Artillery Regiment, in New Orleans (LA) — supports 256th Infantry Brigade Combat Team
  - 28th Combat Aviation Brigade, at Muir Army Heliport (PA)
    - Headquarters and Headquarters Company, at Muir Army Heliport (PA)
    - 2nd Battalion (General Support), 104th Aviation Regiment, at Muir Army Heliport (PA)
    - 1st Battalion (Assault), 150th Aviation Regiment, at Joint Base McGuire–Dix–Lakehurst (NJ) — (New Jersey Army National Guard)
    - 1st Battalion (Assault), 230th Aviation Regiment, in Louisville (TN) — (Tennessee Army National Guard)
    - 628th Aviation Support Battalion, at Muir Army Heliport (PA)
  - 55th Maneuver Enhancement Brigade, in Scranton (PA) — will convert to a Protection Brigade
    - Headquarters Support Company, 55th Maneuver Enhancement Brigade, in Scranton
    - 213th Signal Company, in Tobyhanna
    - 165th Military Police Battalion, at Fort Indiantown Gap (PA)
    - 337th Engineer Battalion, in Danville (PA)
  - 28th Division Sustainment Brigade, in Springfield (OH) — (Ohio Army National Guard)
    - Headquarters and Headquarters Company, 28th Division Sustainment Brigade, in Springfield (OH)
    - 28th Division Sustainment Troops Battalion, in Springfield (OH)
    - 128th Brigade Support Battalion, in Pittsburgh (PA) — supports 2nd Infantry Brigade Combat Team
    - 199th Brigade Support Battalion, in Alexandria (LA) — supports 256th Infantry Brigade Combat Team
    - 328th Light Support Battalion, in Elizabethtown (PA) — supports 56th Mobile Brigade Combat Team
    - 728th Division Sustainment Battalion, in Spring City (PA)
    - 112th Medical Battalion (Multifunctional), in Columbus (OH) (attached)
    - 112th Transportation Battalion, in North Canton (OH) (attached)

== Division commanders ==
Commanders of the 28th Infantry Division include:

- Major General John F. Hartranft 1879–1889
- Major General George R. Snowden 1889–1900
- Major General Charles Miller 1900–1906
- Major General John P. S. Gobin 1906-1907
- Major General John A. Wiley 1907–1909
- Major General Wendell P. Bowman 1909–1910
- Major General Charles B. Dougherty 1910–1915
- Major General Charles M. Clement 1915–1917
- Major General Charles H. Muir 1917–1918
- Major General William H. Hay 1918–1919
- Major General Charles H. Muir 1919–1920
- Major General William G. Price Jr. 1920–1933
- Major General Edward C. Shannon 1933–1939
- Major General Edward Martin 1939–1942
- Major General James Garesche Ord 1942–1942
- Major General Omar N. Bradley 1942–1943
- Major General Lloyd D. Brown 1943–1944
- Brigadier General James E. Wharton † 13 August 1944
- Major General Norman D. Cota 1944–1945
- Major General Edward J. Stackpole 1946–1947
- Major General Daniel B. Strickler 1947–1952
- Major General Cortlandt V. R. Schuyler 1952–1953
- Major General Donald Prentice Booth 1953–1954
- Major General Charles C. Curtis (NGUS) 1953
- Major General Henry K. Fluck 1953–1967
- Major General Nicholas P. Kafkalas 1967–1977
- Major General Fletcher C. Booker Jr. 1977–1980
- Major General Harold J. Lavell 1980–1985
- Major General Vernon E. James 1985–1989
- Major General Daniel J. O'Neill 1989–1994
- Major General Joseph F. Perugino 1994–1996
- Major General Walter L. Stewart Jr. 1996–1998
- Major General Walter F. Pudlowski Jr. 1998–2003
- Major General Wesley E. Craig 2003–2006
- Brigadier General Jerry G. Beck Jr. 2006–2009
- Major General Randall R. Marchi, 2009–2012
- Major General John L. Gronski 2012–2016
- Major General Andrew P. Schafer Jr. 2016–2020
- Major General Mark D. McCormack 2020–2024
- Major General Michael E. Wegscheider 2024–2025
- Brigadier General Reece J. Lutz 2025–present

== Legacy ==
=== Shrine ===
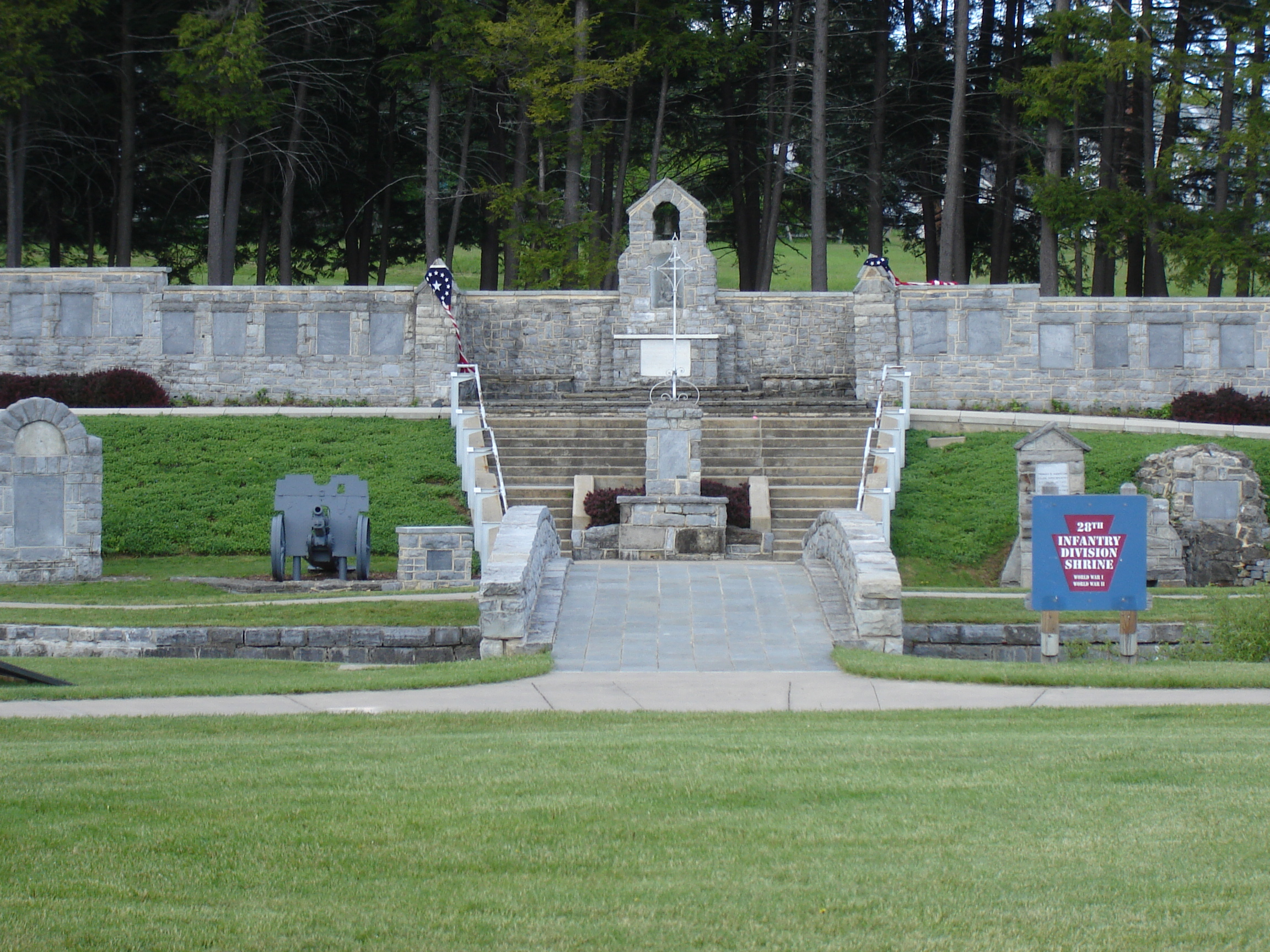
The 28th Division Shrine at the Pennsylvania Military Museum.

A shrine dedicated to the 28th Infantry Division is located on the grounds of the Pennsylvania Military Museum in Boalsburg, Pennsylvania. This site was formerly the estate of Colonel Theodore Davis Boal. In 1916, Boal formed the Boal Troop, a State College-based, horse-mounted machine gun unit of the 1st Pennsylvania Cavalry, which was accepted as a provisional unit of the Pennsylvania Army National Guard. In April 1917, the Boal Troop was reconfigured as an infantry unit, Company A of the 107th Machine Gun Battalion, and deployed to France for service in World War I.

In 1919, soldiers of the Boal Troop returning from the war erected a monument on the Boal Estate dedicated to their fallen comrades. In the 1920s, other units of the 28th began erecting their own memorials, and began to refer to the area as a "shrine." In 1931, the Commonwealth of Pennsylvania purchased the site, and in 1969 the Pennsylvania Military Museum was opened. By 1971, memorials to most of the units of the 28th that served in World War I had been erected, and in 1997 a World War II memorial was dedicated at this site.

Members of the 28th Infantry Division have gathered for a memorial service at the shrine every third Sunday in May since 1919. U.S. Route 322, on which the shrine is located, is named the Pennsylvania 28th Division Highway.

== Honors ==
=== Campaign participation credit ===
Conflict	Streamer	Year(s)
American Civil War.	Peninsula	1862
American Civil War	Antietam	1862
American Civil War	Fredericksburg	1862
American Civil War	Chancellorsville	1863
American Civil War	Gettysburg	1863
American Civil War	Virginia	1863
American Civil War	Wilderness	1864
American Civil War	Spotsylvania	1864
American Civil War	Cold Harbor	1864
American Civil War	Petersburg	1864
War With Spain	Manila	1898
Philippine–American War	Manila	1899
Philippine–American War	Malolos	1899
World War I	Champagne-Marne	1918
World War I	Aisne-Marne	1918
World War I	Oise-Aisne	1918
World War I	Meuse-Argonne	1918
World War I	Champagne	1918
World War I	Lorraine	1918
World War II	Central Pacific	1943
World War II	Eastern Mandates	1944
World War II	Normandy	1944
World War II	Western Pacific	1944
World War II	Northern France	1944
World War II	Rhineland	1944
World War II	Ardennes-Alsace	1944
World War II	Central Europe	1945
Iraq	Iraqi Governance	2004–05
Iraq	National Resolution	2005
Iraq	Iraqi Sovereignty	2009

=== Unit decorations ===
Ribbon	Award	Year	Notes
	Presidential Unit Citation (Army), World War II	1944	Battle of the Bulge
A red ribbon with four vertical dark green stripes in the center.	French Croix de guerre, World War II (with Palm)	1944	Streamer with Palm, embroidered COLMAR.
	Meritorious Unit Commendation (Army), World War II	1944–45	Streamer embroidered EUROPEAN THEATER
	Meritorious Unit Commendation (Army)	2018	Streamer embroidered SOUTHWEST ASIA 2018
	Army Superior Unit Award	2022–23	
	Luxembourg Croix de Guerre, World War II	1944–45	Streamer embroidered LUXEMBOURG

== Heraldic items ==
=== Shoulder sleeve insignia ===
- Description: A red Keystone.
- Symbolism: The keystone, symbol of the state of Pennsylvania, alludes to the nickname of the division.
- Background: The shoulder sleeve insignia was approved on 19 October 1918.
- TIOH Drawing. No. A-1-231

=== Distinctive unit insignia ===
- Description: On a gold disk divided per pairle reversed Gules, Argent and Azure, the crest from the National Guard of the State of Pennsylvania.
- Symbolism:
1. Purportedly, the device was designed by Benjamin Franklin, who aroused the people of Philadelphia.
2. The shield on the device is that of William Penn, while the colors of the wreath, red and white, denote the predominantly English origin of the early settlements.
- Background:
1. The distinctive unit insignia was originally authorized for the 28th Infantry Division Headquarters; Headquarters Detachment, 28th Division; Headquarters Company, 28th Division; Headquarters Special Troops, 28th Division and Headquarters Detachment Special Troops, 28th Division on 6 February 1929.
2. It was redesignated for the non-color bearing units of the 28th Infantry Division on 10 July 1968.

28th Infantry Division Song: "Roll On!"
By SGT Emil Raab (circa 1944)

We're the 28th men and we're out to fight again for the good old U.S.A.
We're the guys who know where to strike the blow and you'll know just why after we say:
Roll On, 28th, Roll On, set the pace, Hold the banners high and raise the cry, We're off to victory!
Let the Keystone shine right down the line for all the world to see.
When we meet the foe we'll let them know we're Iron Infantry,
So Roll On, 28th, Roll On!

== In popular culture ==
The 28th Infantry Division was portrayed in the 1998 HBO film When Trumpets Fade, a movie about the Battle of Hürtgen Forest.

The 1919 silent film J'accuse, a romantic drama set against the horrors of World War I, includes references to the 28th Division's role in the war.

In the 1968 film The Subject Was Roses the character Timmy, played by Martin Sheen wears his 28th Division uniform throughout the picture.

In the 1974 TV movie The Execution of Private Slovik starring Martin Sheen as Slovik, the 28th Division patch is seen on many characters, including on Sheen's character.

In the opening scenes of the 1978 film Dawn of the Dead, Soldiers are seen wearing red keystones on their uniforms. The Soldier in the movie The Happening is wearing keystone patches on his uniform.

The 28th Infantry Division is mentioned in the miniseries Band of Brothers in episode 5, "Crossroads" at approximately 43 minutes in the movie theater scene.

References to the 28th Infantry Division's World War II experiences appear in the book Company Commander by Charles Brown MacDonald. They appear in Chapter 2 of the print version or at 43:17 of the audio version.

== Notable personnel ==
- Hervey Allen served with the 28th Division in World War I
- Art Carney served with the 28th Division, World War II

== See also ==
- Fort Indiantown Gap
- Pennsylvania National Guard

== Bibliography ==
- American Battle Monuments Commission (1938–1992). American Armies and Battlefields in Europe. Washington, D.C.: Government Printing Office. OCLC 25316157.
- American Battle Monuments Commission (1944). 28th Division Summary of Operations in the World War. Washington, D.C.: Government Printing Office. OCLC 1022279.
- Blumenson, Martin (1961). Breakout and Pursuit. United States Army in World War II. Washington, D.C.: United States Army Center of Military History/Government Printing Office. OCLC 78605078.
- Clyma, Carleton B., ed. (1945). Connecticut Men, 28th—Bloody Bucket—Division, September 1945. Hartford, Connecticut.
- Colbaugh, Jack, ed. (1973). The Bloody Patch: A True Story of the Daring 28th Infantry Division. New York, New York: Vantage Press. ISBN 0-533-00851-4. OCLC 1092266.
- Cole, Hugh M. (1965). The Ardennes: Battle of the Bulge. United States Army in World War II. Washington, D.C.: United States Army Center of Military History/Government Printing Office. OCLC 78624377.
- Curry, Cecil B. (1984). Follow Me and Die. The Destruction of an American Division in World War II. New York, New York: Stein & Day Publishing. ISBN 0-8128-2892-5. OCLC 9895460.
- Ent, Uzal W. (1979). The First Century of the 28th Infantry Division. Harrisburg, Pennsylvania: Stackpole Books. ISBN 0-8117-0620-6. OCLC 5563914.
- Gabel, Christopher R (1991). The U.S. Army GHQ Maneuvers of 1941. United States Army Center of Military History/Government Printing Office. OCLC 23651527.
- Gilbert, Eugene (1919). The 28th Division in France. Nancy, France: Berger-Levrault. OCLC 3147481.
- Historical and Pictorial Review of the 28th Infantry Division in World War II ... Normandy; Northern France, Rhineland, Ardennes, Central Europe. Atlanta, Georgia: Albert Love Enterprises. 1946. OCLC 1823326.
- Historical and Pictorial Review of the 28th Infantry Division in World War II ... Normandy; Northern France, Rhineland, Ardennes, Central Europe (Reprint ed.). Nashville, Tennessee: Battery Press. 1980. ISBN 0-89839-035-4. OCLC 7169903.
- Order of Battle of the United States Land Forces in World War; American Expeditionary Forces; Divisions. Washington, D.C.: Historical Section, Army War College / Government Printing Office. 1931–1988. OCLC 16582087.
- Order of Battle of the United States Land Forces in World War; American Expeditionary Forces; Divisions. Washington, D.C.: United States Army Center of Military History/Government Printing Office. 1988.
- McLemore, H; Kahn, E.J. Jr. (1945). Fighting Divisions. Washington, D.C.: Infantry Journal Press. OCLC 1520083.
- McLemore, H; Kahn, E.J. Jr. (1980). Fighting Divisions. Washington, D.C.: Zenger Publishing Company.
- The 'Keystone Division.' A Condensed History of the 28th Infantry Division. National Guardsman. June 1948. pp. 13–14.
- Keystone News, Organization Day, 1953 (1953). Keystone Division's 36th Anniversary. Goppingen, Germany.
- MacDonald, Charles B, Charles B. (1973). The Last Offensive. United States Army in World War II. Washington, District of Columbia: United States Army Center of Military History/Government Printing Office. OCLC 614914511.
- MacDonald, Charles B. (1963). The Siegfried Line Campaign. United States Army in World War II. Washington, D.C.: United States Army Center of Military History/Government Printing Office. OCLC 1351714.
- MacDonald, Charles B. & Mathews, Sydney T (1952). Three Battles: Arnaville, Altuzzo, and Schmidt. United States Army in World War II. Washington, D.C.: United States Army Center of Military History/Government Printing Office. OCLC 1350067.
- Martin, Edward, ed. (1924). The Twenty-Eighth Division, Pennsylvania Guard in the World War. Norwood, Mass: Washington Press. OCLC 2886171.
- Nevitt, Thomas R (October 1948). A Guard Division Trains for M—Day. Washington, D.C.: Army Information Digest. p. 35.
- Ohe, John K (Summer 1978). The Keystone Division in the Great War. Washington, D.C.: Prologue, The Journal of the National Archives. pp. 82–89.
- Peterman, I.H. (28 September 1946). "They Took the Nazis' Sunday Punch". Saturday Evening Post. pp. 2 Otf.
- Pennsylvania in the World War. An Illustrated History of the Twenty-Eighth Division. 2 vols. Pittsburgh, Pennsylvania: States Publications Society. 1921. OCLC 3878635.
- Proctor, Henry George (1919). The Iron Division, National Guard of Pennsylvania in the World War; the Authentic and Comprehensive Narrative of the 28th Division in the World's Greatest War. Philadelphia, Pennsylvania: John C. Winston Co. OCLC 587848.
- A short history and illustrated roster of the 109th Field Artillery, Third Penna. Field Artillery, 53rd Artillery Brigade, 28th Division, armies of the United States. Colonel Asher Miner, commanding officer. Headquarters, Home Station, Wilkes-Barre, Penna. 1879-1917. Edward Stern Co. c. 1919. OCLC 5621531.
- Smith, Herbert E. (1 January 1934). A. E. F. Divisional Insignia- The Twenty-Eighth Division. Washington, D.C.: Recruiting News. p. 3.
- National Guardsman. SRF. November 1965. pp. 8–16. OCLC 1713900.
- The States Pass in Review: Pennsylvania, 28th Infantry (Keystone Division). Washington, D.C.: National Guard. January 1991. p. 125.
- Taylor, Benjamin G. (August 1954). Operation Schmidt. Washington, D.C.: Military Review. pp. 30–39. OCLC 173329860.
- 28th Infantry Division—Germany, 1953. n.p. 1953.
- 28th Infantry Division, Pennsylvania National Guard Summer Encampment, 1956. n.p. 1956. OCLC 23466167.
- Twenty-Eighth Infantry Division, United States Army, Camp Atterbury, Indiana, "Roll on 28th," Pictorial Review, 1950–1951. Atlanta, Georgia: Albert Love Enterprises. 1951.
- Twenty-Eighth Infantry Division, United States Army, Europe, Pictorial Review, 1951–1952. Atlanta, Georgia: Albert Love Enterprises. 1952.
- 28th Roll On: The Story of the 28th Infantry Division. Paris, France: G.I. Stories. 1945.
- Warner, Frank A. (1919). Journal of Operations, Twenty-Eighth Division A.E.F., August 5, 1917 [to] November 2, 1918. n.p. OCLC 4139192.
- Weaver, Michael E. (2010). Guard Wars: The 28th Infantry Division in World War II. Indiana University Press. ISBN 978-0-253-35521-8.
