= 28th Signal Battalion (United States) =

National Guard unit of the US Army

- 28th Signal Battalion coat of arms
- Active: 1908–1919; 1921–1945; 1950(?)-present(?)
- Country: United States
- Branch: U.S. Army
- Part of: 28th Infantry Division (United States)
- Battle honours: World War I: Champagne-Marne; Aisne-Marne; Oise-Aisne; Meuse-Argonne; Champagne 1918; Lorraine 1918; World War II: Normandy; Northern France; Rhineland; Ardennes-Alsace; Central Europe

28th Signal Battalion is a battalion of the US Army formed on 12 September 1908 in Pennsylvania as a National Guard unit at Pittsburgh as Company A, Signal Corps. It served alongside the regular army under Federal control several times, most notably during World War I, World War II, and the Cold War from 1950. Its home area is Southwestern Pennsylvania.

As a National Guard unit, its main purpose is to assist the State Government in response to events which require more manpower or specialist skill that traditional first responders cannot provide, such as in large scale riots, and natural disasters. However, when in Federal service alongside the regular army its main purpose is to provide communications support to the units it is attached to.

== Lineage of the 28th Signal Battalion ==
It was organized 12 September 1908 in the Pennsylvania National Guard at Pittsburgh as Company A, Signal Corps. It was redesignated 1 October 1912 as Field Company A, Signal Corps and redesignated again on 14 February 1916 as the Wire Company, Field Battalion, Signal Troops. It was mustered into federal service 29 June 1916 at Mount Gretna; mustered out of federal service 18 January 1917 as Company B, Field Battalion, Signal Troops. Again Mustered into federal service on 23 July 1917 at Pittsburgh as Company B, Field Battalion, Signal Corps; drafted into federal service 5 August 1917. It was Reorganized and redesignated 11 October 1917 as Company B, 103d Field Signal Battalion, an element of the 28th Division and demobilized 20 May 1919 at Camp Dix, New Jersey.

It was reorganized by LTC Sidney A. Haderling and Major Walter A. Hardie and federally recognized 16 December 1921 in the Pennsylvania National Guard at Pittsburgh as the 28th Signal Company and assigned to the 28th Division (later redesignated as the 28th Infantry Division (United States)); inducted into federal service 17 February 1941 at Pittsburgh. and inactivated 27 October 1945 at Camp Shelby, Mississippi. Reorganized and federally recognized 10 October at Pittsburgh, and ordered into active federal service 5 September 1950 at Pittsburgh.

The 28th Signal Company (NGUS) organized and federally recognized 18 August 1953 at Pittsburgh. It was released 15 June 1954 from active federal service and reverted to state control; federal recognition concurrently withdrawn from the 28th Signal Company (NGUS). It was then expanded, reorganized, and redesignated 1 June 1959 as the 28th Signal Battalion with headquarters in Pittsburgh. Location of headquarters changed 1 August 1961 to Coraopolis, Pennsylvania.

In 1968, the battalion was called upon for the riots in Pittsburgh which followed the assassination of Martin Luther King Jr. In 1974, the battalion patrolled the streets of Pennsylvania and provided a communications net during the violent independent truckers strike. It has been called out for winter storms, floods and tornadoes on several occasions.

In November 1993 the battalion was issued new equipment. Mobile Subscriber Equipment (MSE) is the Army standard equipment for corps and below. The fielding took place during a three-week annual training period at Fort Indiantown Gap, PA. This was a massive undertaking which required approximately two years of planning and two years of fielding and training. The Army contracted GTE to assist with all phases of the total package fielding.

== Campaign participation credit ==
World War I:

- Champagne-Marne
- Aisne-Marne
- Oise-Aisne
- Meuse-Argonne
- Champagne 1918
- Lorraine 1918

World War II:

- Normandy
- Northern France
- Rhineland
- Ardennes-Alsace
- Central Europe

Company B (Beaver Falls) additionally entitled to:

- War with Spain (Manila)
- Philippine Insurrection (Manila, and Malolos)

== Decorations ==
- Meritorious Unit Commendation (Awarded 18 April 1945)
- Luxembourg Croix de Guerre (Awarded 1950)
