= Andrew P. Schafer Jr. =

US Army major general

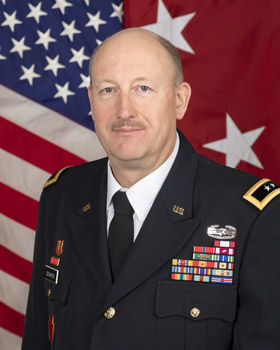
- Born: June 27, 1961 (age 65); Queens, New York City, New York, US
- Education: Nassau Community College; State University of New York at Old Westbury; United States Army Command and General Staff College; United States Army War College
- Spouse: Paula E. Myers (m. 1985)
- Children: 3
- Military career
- Service: United States Army
- Service years: 1981–2020
- Rank: Major General
- Units: United States Army Reserve; New Jersey Army National Guard; Pennsylvania Army National Guard
- Commands: Company C, 5th Battalion, 102nd Armor Regiment; Headquarters and Headquarters Company, 2nd Battalion, 102nd Armor Regiment; Company A, 2nd Battalion, 103rd Armor Regiment; 3rd Battalion, 103rd Armor Regiment; 56th Stryker Brigade Combat Team; 28th Infantry Division
- Conflicts: Iraq War; Operation Spartan Shield
- Awards: Army Distinguished Service Medal; Bronze Star Medal; Meritorious Service Medal (6); Complete list
- Other work: Computer engineer Deputy Director, Armament Software Engineering Center, Picatinny Arsenal

Andrew P. Schafer (born 27 June 1961) is a retired United States Army officer. He served in the New Jersey Army National Guard and Pennsylvania Army National Guard from 1983 to 2020 and attained the rank of major general. A veteran of the Iraq War and Operation Spartan Shield, his awards included the Army Distinguished Service Medal, Bronze Star Medal, and multiple awards of the Meritorious Service Medal. As a colonel, Schafer commanded the 56th Stryker Brigade Combat Team from 2009 to 2012. As a major general, he commanded the 28th Infantry Division from 2016 to 2020.

== Early career ==
Schafer was born in Queens, New York on 27 June 1961. He completed an associate of science in information processing at Nassau Community College and a bachelor of science degree in business management at the State University of New York at Old Westbury. In his civilian career, he was a computer engineer at Picatinny Arsenal, where he worked on projects including the trainer for the M109 howitzer and the conduct of fire simulator for the M1 Abrams tank. After entering the management ranks, he became deputy director of Picatinny's Armament Software Engineering Center.

While attending SUNY Old Westbury, Schafer served in the United States Army Reserve and enrolled in the Reserve Officers' Training Corps at Hofstra University. In 1983, he received his commission as a second lieutenant of Armor and joined the New Jersey Army National Guard's Company C, 5th Battalion, 102nd Armor Regiment as a platoon leader. His subsequent assignments included executive officer of Company C, and 5th Battalion's scout platoon leader. He commanded Company C from February 1987 to May 1991, and the Headquarters and Headquarters Company of 2nd Battalion, 102nd Armor from May 1991 to January 1994.

=== Military education ===
Professional education Schafer completed during his military career includes:

- Armor Officer Basic Course
- Armor Officer Advanced Course
- Combined Arms and Services Staff School
- M1 Tank Transition Training
- Tank Commander Course
- United States Army Command and General Staff College
- Advanced Systems, Planning, Research, Development and Engineering Course
- United States Army War College (master of strategic studies degree)
- Stryker Vehicle Commander's Training Course
- Dual Status Commanders Course
- General Officer Legal Orientation Course (RC-GOLO)
- Army Senior Leader Development Program-Basic (ASLDP-B)
- Joint Flag Officer Warfighting Course (JFOWC)

== Continued career ==
In January 1994, Schafer transferred his military membership to the Pennsylvania Army National Guard and was assigned as liaison officer on the staff of the 55th Infantry Brigade. From October 1994 to February 1996, he commanded Company A, 2nd Battalion, 103rd Armor Regiment, and from February 1996 to January 1997, he served as Operations, Training and Intelligence Staff Officer (S2/3) at Headquarters, Pennsylvania State Area Command. From February 1997 to August 1998 he was assigned as Plans, Operations, and Training Officer (S3) for 3rd Battalion, 103rd Armor, after which he was assigned as the battalion's executive officer.

From July 2001 to December 2004, Schafer was commander of 3rd Battalion, 103rd Armor Regiment. He then served as assistant chief of staff for logistics (G4) on the staff of the 28th Infantry Division. From February to October 2006, Schafer served as director of maintenance on the staff of Pennsylvania's Joint Force Headquarters (JFHQ). From October 2006 to March 2007, he was assigned as chief of staff at the JFHQ, and from march to June 2007, he was assigned as a JFHQ strategic planner.

== Later career ==
In June 2007, Schafer was appointed deputy commander of the 55th Brigade Combat Team, where he served until February 2008. He was then assigned as deputy commander of the 56th Brigade Combat Team. He remained in this position until October 2009, including deployment to Taji, Iraq during Operation Iraqi Freedom. Upon returning to the United States, Schafer was assigned to command of the 56th Brigade, and he remained in this position until May 2012.

In May 2012, Schafer was assigned as assistant division commander of the 28th Infantry Division, and he was promoted to brigadier general in December 2012. He continued to serve in this role until May 2016, when he was appointed to command of the division, and he was promoted to major general in June 2017. He commanded the 28th Division until retiring in September 2020, which included deployment to Kuwait for Operation Spartan Shield. At his retirement, Schafer received the Pennsylvania Distinguished Service Medal and promotion to lieutenant general on Pennsylvania's retired list.

== Awards ==
Schafer's federal awards included:

- Army Distinguished Service Medal
- Bronze Star Medal
- Meritorious Service Medal with 1 Silver oak leaf cluster
- Army Commendation Medal with 4 bronze oak leaf clusters
- Army Achievement Medal
- Army Meritorious Unit Commendation
- Army Reserve Components Achievement Medal with 1 silver oak leaf cluster and 2 bronze oak leaf clusters
- National Defense Service Medal with 1 bronze service star
- Iraq Campaign Medal with 1 campaign star
- Global War on Terrorism Expeditionary Medal
- Global War on Terrorism Service Medal
- Armed Forces Reserve Medal with gold hourglass, M device and numeral 3
- Army Service Ribbon
- Overseas Service Ribbon with numeral 2
- Army Reserve Components Overseas Training Ribbon with numeral 5
- Combat Action Badge

== Dates of rank ==
Schafer's dates of rank were:

- Lieutenant General (Retired list), 18 September 2020
- Major General (Retired), 18 September 2020
- Major General, 22 June 2017
- Brigadier General, 21 December 2012
- Colonel, 20 March 2006
- Lieutenant Colonel, 17 October 2001
- Major, 5 June 1996
- Captain, 3 June 1988
- First Lieutenant, 19 July 86
- Second Lieutenant, 20 July 1983
