= Francis J. Clark =

United States Army soldier

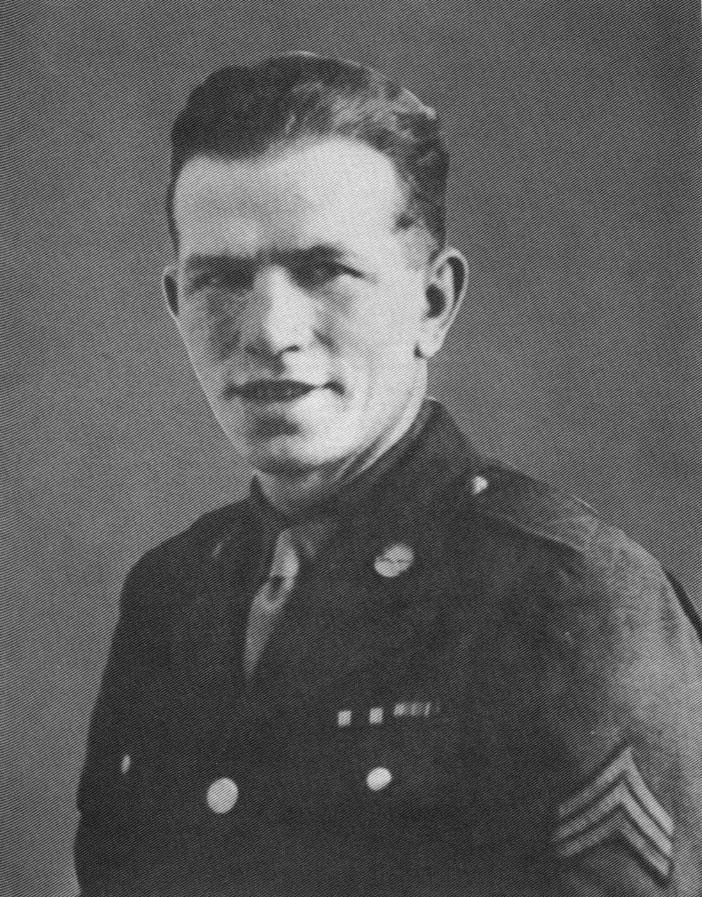
- 1945 photo by 109th Infantry Regiment
- Born: April 22, 1912; Whitehall, New York, U.S.
- Died: October 20, 1981 (aged 69); Salem, New York, U.S.
- Burial place: Evergreen Cemetery, Salem, New York
- Military career
- Allegiance: United States of America
- Branch: United States Army
- Service years: 1942-1945
- Rank: Technical Sergeant
- Units: 109th Infantry Regiment, 28th Infantry Division
- Conflicts: World War II
- Awards: Medal of Honor
- Other work: Farmer; Furniture factory worker Elected official

Francis J. Clark (April 22, 1912 – October 20, 1981) was a United States Army soldier and a recipient of the United States military's highest decoration—the Medal of Honor—for his actions in World War II.

== Biography ==
Clark was born in Whitehall, New York on April 22, 1912. He was raised in Salem, New York, where he attended the local schools, and he was a graduate of Granville High School. He was a farmer, and also worked at a furniture factory. Clark joined the Army in March 1942, and by September 12, 1944, was serving as a technical sergeant in Company K, 109th Infantry Regiment, 28th Infantry Division. On that day, near Kalborn, Luxembourg, he crawled through open terrain to reach a platoon which had been pinned down by heavy fire, led them to safety, and then returned to rescue a wounded man. Five days later, near Sevenig (Our), Germany, he single-handedly attacked a German machine gun position and then assumed command of two leaderless platoons. Although wounded, he refused medical evacuation, attacked two more German machine gun positions alone, and carried supplies through hostile fire to an isolated platoon. For these actions, he was awarded the Medal of Honor a year later, on September 10, 1945.

Clark left the Army while still a technical sergeant. He lived in Salem, where he resumed farming and working at the furniture factory in nearby Granville. He became active in politics as a Republican, and served in local offices including mayor of the village of Salem, town supervisor of the town of Salem, and chairman of the Washington County Board of Supervisors.

He died on October 20, 1981, at age 69 and was buried at Evergreen Cemetery in Salem.

The American Legion post in Salem is named for him.

== Medal of Honor citation ==
Technical Sergeant Clark's official Medal of Honor citation reads:

He fought gallantly in Luxembourg and Germany. On 12 September 1944, Company K began fording the Our River near Kalborn, Luxembourg, to take high ground on the opposite bank. Covered by early morning fog, the 3d Platoon, in which T/Sgt. Clark was squad leader, successfully negotiated the crossing; but when the 2d Platoon reached the shore, withering automatic and small-arms fire ripped into it, eliminating the platoon leader and platoon sergeant and pinning down the troops in the open. From his comparatively safe position, T/Sgt. Clark crawled alone across a field through a hail of bullets to the stricken troops. He led the platoon to safety and then unhesitatingly returned into the fire-swept area to rescue a wounded soldier, carrying him to the American line while hostile gunners tried to cut him down. Later, he led his squad and men of the 2d Platoon in dangerous sorties against strong enemy positions to weaken them by lightning-like jabs. He assaulted an enemy machinegun with hand grenades, killing 2 Germans. He roamed the front and flanks, dashing toward hostile weapons, killing and wounding an undetermined number of the enemy, scattering German patrols and, eventually, forcing the withdrawal of a full company of Germans heavily armed with automatic weapons. On 17 September, near Sevenig, Germany, he advanced alone against an enemy machinegun, killed the gunner and forced the assistant to flee. The Germans counterattacked, and heavy casualties were suffered by Company K. Seeing that 2 platoons lacked leadership, T/Sgt. Clark took over their command and moved among the men to give encouragement. Although wounded on the morning of 18 September, he refused to be evacuated and took up a position in a pillbox when night came. Emerging at daybreak, he killed a German soldier setting up a machinegun not more than 5 yards away. When he located another enemy gun, he moved up unobserved and killed 2 Germans with rifle fire. Later that day he voluntarily braved small-arms fire to take food and water to members of an isolated platoon. T/Sgt. Clark's actions in assuming command when leadership was desperately needed, in launching attacks and beating off counterattacks, in aiding his stranded comrades, and in fearlessly facing powerful enemy fire, were strikingly heroic examples and put fighting heart into the hard-pressed men of Company K.

== See also ==
- List of Medal of Honor recipients
- List of Medal of Honor recipients for World War II
