= 107th Field Artillery Regiment (United States) =

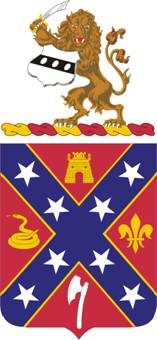
- Regimental Coat of Arms
- Active: 1861 – Present
- Country: (United States)
- Branch: United States Army
- Type: Field artillery
- Role: USARS parent regiment
- Size: Regiment
- Part of: 2nd Infantry Brigade Combat Team, 28th Infantry Division
- Home station: New Castle, Pennsylvania
- Patron: Saint Barbara
- Motto: "Gettysburg to the Marne"
- Anniversaries: 8 October 1861
- Equipment: M119A3 & M777A2
- Engagements: American Civil War; War with Spain; World War I World War II
- Decorations: Presidential Unit Citation; Army Superior Unit Award

Commanders
- Current commander: LTC Matthew Emmerson
- Command Sergeant Major: CSM Christopher Harwick
- Notable commanders: Robert B. Hampton; Alfred E. Hunt; COL William S. McKee

Insignia
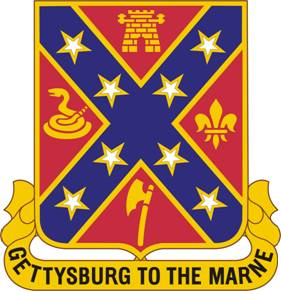
- Distinctive unit insignia

The 107th Field Artillery Regiment is a Field Artillery Branch regiment of the United States Army. It has been affiliated with the Pennsylvania National Guard since its formation. It appears that the regiment last formally came into existence in June 1959, when the 107th Field Artillery Battalion was reorganized as the new Regiment's 1st Battalion in line with the Pentomic (ROCID) reorganization going on at that time.

== History ==
The regiment traces its lineage to that of Independent Battery F of the American Civil War. During the Battle of Gettysburg a member of the unit, Casper R. Carlisle, earned the Medal of Honor. It was from various sources, including units of the Pennsylvania National Guard which had fought in the Spanish–American War, and served in the Mexican Expedition, that the regiment was formed.

The 1st Field Artillery Regiment of the Pennsylvania National Guard was reorganized and redesignated 11 October 1917 as the 107th Field Artillery and assigned to the 28th Division. Demobilized 21 May 1919 at Camp Dix, New Jersey. Reorganized 16 October 1919 in the Pennsylvania National Guard at Pittsburgh as the 1st Field Artillery. Redesignated 1 April 1921 as the 107th Field Artillery and assigned to the 28th Division; Headquarters federally recognized 22 June 1921 at Pittsburgh. Inducted into federal service 17 February 1941 at home stations. Regiment broken up 17 February 1942 and its elements reorganized and redesignated as follows: Headquarters and Headquarters Battery disbanded; 2d Battalion as the 229th Field Artillery Battalion, an element of the 28th Infantry Division (1st Battalion as the 107th Field Artillery Battalion and relieved from assignment to the 28th Division—hereafter separate lineage). 229th Field Artillery Battalion inactivated 22 October 1945 at Camp Shelby, Mississippi. Consolidated 22 October 1946 with Headquarters and Headquarters Battery, 107th Field Artillery (reconstituted 25 August 1945 in the Pennsylvania National Guard), and consolidated unit reorganized and federally recognized at Pittsburgh as the 107th Field Artillery Battalion, an element of the 28th Infantry Division. Ordered into active federal service 5 September 1950 at Pittsburgh. (107th Field Artillery Battalion [NGUS] organized and federally recognized 25 August 1953 at Pittsburgh.) Released 15 June 1954 from active federal service and reverted to state control; federal recognition concurrently withdrawn from the 107th Field Artillery Battalion (NGUS).

Reorganized and redesignated 1 June 1959 as the 107th Artillery, a parent regiment under the Combat Arms Regimental System, to consist of the 1st Howitzer Battalion, an element of the 28th Infantry Division. Reorganized 1 April 1963 to consist of the 1st Battalion, an element of the 28th Infantry Division. Reorganized 17 February 1968 to consist of the 1st Battalion, an element of the 42d Infantry Division. Redesignated 1 May 1972 as the 107th Field Artillery. Reorganized 1 April 1975 to consist of the 1st Battalion, an element of the 28th Infantry Division. Withdrawn 5 April 1988 from the Combat Arms Regimental System and reorganized under the United States Army Regimental System.

=== Operation Iraqi Freedom 2003–2005 ===
In December 2003 the 1st Battalion, 107th Field Artillery Regiment, was activated and received Military Police training at Fort Dix, New Jersey. Following a month of training, the soldiers of the 107th were deployed to Iraq for Operation Iraqi Freedom. The different batteries were dispersed throughout Iraq serving as MPs. The members of the 107th returned home in February 2005. B Battery combined with soldiers of C Battery saw action in Camp Ashraf with Iranian defectors and were also tasked with providing security for about a hundred bunkers. In late March 2004 C Battery was notified of a move to Camp Fallujah during Operation Valiant Resolve in the spring campaign during which C Battery lost 2 of its Members Sgt Carl Curran (Union City, PA) and SPC Mark Kasecky (McKees Rocks, PA) IED attack which also injured Sgt Robert Emerick (Pittsburgh, PA) Members of C Battery also saw combat in the area surrounding Camp Anaconda and Abu Ghraib, a military prison. C Battery carried on another important mission with Navy Seal teams 1 and 2 west coast providing PSD (Personal Security Detail) on the Iraqi President. Another contingent provided security for Ambassador Paul Bremer and other high-ranking State Department officials at Coalition HQ. Awards for NCO of the year went to Sgt Ellison George (Franklin, PA) and Enlisted award went to Spc Wilcox (Pittsburgh, PA).

Members of A Battery with attachments from Headquarters Battery were provisionally renamed Alpha Company 107th Military Police and deployed to Mosul, Iraq. Alpha Company was assigned to I Corps (Task Force Olympia) from Ft. Lewis, WA. 1st Platoon, located on Logistics Support Area Diamondback (Mosul Air Base), finished construction of the military detention facility and continued to run it until re-deployment. 2nd Platoon provided external base security for the detention facility, a quick reaction force for the company and an additional security detachment for top military officials in Iraq including the Task Force Olympia's Commanding General, Deputy Commander, Provost Marshal and various VIPs at Camp Freedom. 3rd Platoon conducted Military Police combat operations with the 3rd SBCT, 2nd Infantry Division, as well as security missions for the Iraqi National Guard, Iraqi police forces, and other coalition provisional governmental organizations in Mosul. Alpha Company also provided logistic support and additional convoy and unit security for separate units with no local higher headquarters including the 330th MP Company (L&O), CID detachment and soldiers from the 3rd platoon of the 293d MP Company which was briefly attached. The Company served from February 2004 to February 2005.

== Lineage and honors ==
=== Lineage ===
- Constituted 14 December 1870 in the Pennsylvania National Guard as the 14th Infantry Regiment.
- Organized 3 January 1871 from existing companies at Pittsburgh.
- Mustered into Federal service 12 May 1898 at Mount Gretna as the 14th Pennsylvania Volunteer Infantry; mustered out of Federal service 28 February 1899 and resumed state status as the 14th Infantry Regiment.
- Converted and redesignated 1 March 1916 as the 1st Field Artillery Regiment.
- Mustered into Federal service 5 July 1916 at Mount Gretna; mustered out of Federal service 28 November – 4 December 1916 at Pittsburgh.
- Mustered into Federal service 15–25 July 1917; drafted into Federal service 5 August 1917.
- Reorganized and redesignated 11 October 1917 as the 107th Field Artillery and assigned to the 28th Division.
- Demobilized 21 May 1919 at Camp Dix, New Jersey.
- Reorganized 16 October 1919 in the Pennsylvania National Guard at Pittsburgh as the 1st Field Artillery.
- Redesignated 1 April 1921 as the 107th Field Artillery and assigned to the 28th Division; Headquarters Federally recognized

22 June 1921 at Pittsburgh.

- Inducted into Federal service 17 February 1941 at home stations.
- Regiment broken up 17 February 1942 and its elements reorganized and redesignated as follows:
  - Headquarters and Headquarters Battery disbanded.
  - 2d Battalion as the 229th Field Artillery Battalion, an element of the 28th Infantry Division

(1st Battalion as the 107th Field Artillery Battalion and relieved from assignment to the 28th Division—hereafter separate lineage).

  - 229th Field Artillery Battalion inactivated 22 October 1945 at Camp Shelby, Mississippi.
- Consolidated 22 October 1946 with Headquarters and Headquarters Battery, 107th Field Artillery (reconstituted 25 August 1945 in the Pennsylvania National Guard), and consolidated unit reorganized and Federally recognized at Pittsburgh as the 107th Field Artillery Battalion, an element of the 28th Infantry Division.
- Ordered into active Federal service 5 September 1950 at Pittsburgh.

(107th Field Artillery Battalion [NGUS] organized and federally recognized 25 August 1953 at Pittsburgh.)

- Released 15 June 1954 from active Federal service and reverted to state control; Federal recognition concurrently withdrawn from the 107th Field Artillery Battalion (NGUS).
- Reorganized and redesignated 1 June 1959 as the 107th Artillery, a parent regiment under the Combat Arms Regimental System, to consist of the 1st Howitzer Battalion, an element of the 28th Infantry Division.
- Reorganized 1 April 1963 to consist of the 1st Battalion, an element of the 28th Infantry Division.
- Reorganized 17 February 1968 to consist of the 1st Battalion, an element of the 42d Infantry Division.
- Redesignated 1 May 1972 as the 107th Field Artillery. Reorganized 1 April 1975 to consist of the 1st Battalion, an element of the 28th Infantry Division.
- Withdrawn 5 April 1988 from the Combat Arms Regimental System and reorganized under the United States Army Regimental System.

=== Campaign participation credit ===
- World War I: Oise-Aisne; Ypres-Lys; Meuse-Argonne; Champagne 1918; Lorraine 1918
- World War II: Normandy; Northern France; Rhineland; Ardennes-Alsace; Central Europe

Battery B (Hampton Battery – Pittsburgh), 1st Battalion, additionally entitled to:
- Civil War: Valley; Manassas; Antietam; Chancellorsville; Gettysburg; Virginia 1862; Virginia 1863; Virginia 1864
- War with Spain: Puerto Rico

=== Decorations ===
- Presidential Unit Citation (Army), Streamer embroidered ARDENNES (229th Field Artillery Battalion cited; DAGO 63, 1947)
- Luxembourg Croix de Guerre, Streamer embroidered LUXEMBOURG (229th Field Artillery Battalion cited; DA GO 43, 1950)
- Cited in the Order of the Day of the Belgian Army for action in the Ardennes (229th Field Artillery Battalion cited: DA GO 43, 1950)
- Army Superior Unit Award, for meritorious service in connection with difficult and challenging missions during peacetime: (GO 2013–17)"Army Superior Unit Award" (PDF).

== Heraldry ==
The Red Shield for Artillery, Blue Saltire represents Civil War Service with the Federal Forces and the white stars for the engagements of that war, The Castle taken from the Puerto Rican Occupation, indicates service in the Spanish–American War (1898), The Coiled Rattle Snake for Border Mexican Duty (1916), the Fleur-De-Lis for Service during World War I, and the Norman Battle Axe for Service during World War II.

== Coat of arms ==
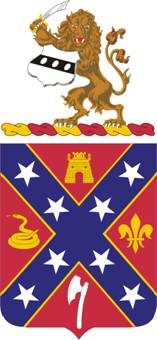

The coat of arms was originally approved for the 107th Field Artillery Regiment, Pennsylvania National Guard on 17 June 1929. It was amended to correct the wording in the description on 13 June 1930. It was redesignated for the 107th Field Artillery Battalion, Pennsylvania National Guard on 3 December 1942. The insignia was amended by addition of a charge (battle-axe) to represent World War II service on 20 May 1953. It was redesignated for the 107th Artillery, Pennsylvania National Guard on 14 September 1961. The insignia was redesignated for the 107th Field Artillery Regiment, Pennsylvania Army National Guard on 11 July 1972.

=== Distinctive unit insignia ===
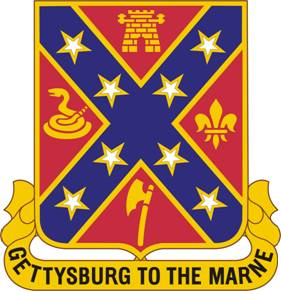
