= 2nd Infantry Brigade Combat Team, 28th Infantry Division =

Pennsylvania Army National Guard formation

Shoulder sleeve insignia of the 28th "Keystone" Infantry Division. Worn by soldiers of 2nd Brigade, 28th Infantry Division.

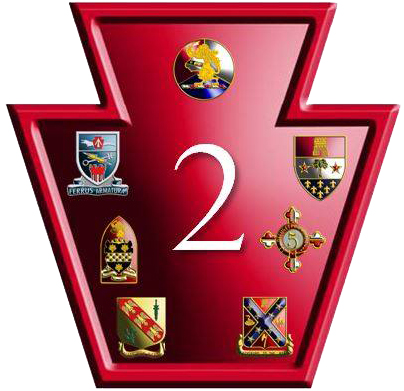
Distinctive brigade badge

The 2nd Infantry Brigade Combat Team is a unit of the Pennsylvania Army National Guard’s 28th Infantry Division. 2nd Brigade's headquarters is in Washington, Pennsylvania, and the brigade also contains units from Ohio and Maryland.

== History ==
Headquarters, 2nd Infantry Brigade Combat Team was organized in July 1872 as a company called the Washington Guards. In November 1873, the company was formally incorporated into the Pennsylvania National Guard as Company H, 10th Pennsylvania Infantry Regiment.

Company H was mobilized for the Spanish–American War from 1898 to 1899 and served in the Philippines. In 1916, the company was federalized for service on the Mexico–United States border during the Pancho Villa Expedition.

In 1917, Company H merged with Company H, 3rd Infantry Regiment, and the new unit was designated Company H, 110th Infantry Regiment. From August, 1917 to June, 1920 the 110th Infantry was mobilized for service in France during World War I.

Company H, 110th Infantry was inducted into federal service for World War II in February 1942. It served with the 28th Infantry Division in the European Theater, and was demobilized in October, 1945.

In September 1950, Company H was activated for service during the Korean War, and remained mobilized in West Germany until June, 1954.

Company H was re-designated Company C, 1st Battle Group, 110th Infantry as part of a 1959 reorganization.

In 1963, Company C was combined with Headquarters, 1st Battle Group, and the new unit was designated Headquarters and Headquarters Company, 2nd Brigade, 28th Infantry Division.

In 1968, the 2nd Brigade Headquarters was reorganized as the 689th Military Police Company. In the early 1970s, another reorganization led to the creation of the 408th General Supply Company.

The 408th General Supply Company was again designated Headquarters and Headquarters Company, 2nd Brigade, 28th Infantry Division as the result of a 1975 reorganization.

== Campaign participation credit ==
=== War with Spain ===
- Manila

=== Philippine–American War ===
- Manila
- Malolos

=== World War I ===
- Champagne-Marne
- Aisne-Marne
- Oise-Aisne
- Meuse-Argonne
- Champagne 1918
- Lorraine 1918

=== World War II ===
- Normandy
- Northern France
- Rhineland
- Ardennes-Alsace
- Central Europe

=== War in Iraq ===
- Al Anbar campaign

== Decorations ==
=== World War II ===
- Luxembourg Croix de Guerre, streamer embroidered LUXEMBOURG. (110th Infantry cited; Department of the Army General Order 43, 1950)

=== War in Iraq ===
- Navy Unit Commendation (as part of I Marine Expeditionary Force (Forward))

== Recent events ==
Following the September 11, 2001 terrorist attacks, members of 2nd Brigade mobilized as units and individuals for both homeland security and missions in Iraq and Afghanistan.

In 2005 and 2006 2nd Brigade served in Iraq under the command of Colonel John L. Gronski, who led a temporary task organization that included units from Vermont, Kentucky, Nebraska, Utah, Indiana and Michigan, as well as regular Army units from the 3rd Infantry Division and 101st Airborne Division. This task organization also included battalions of the United States Marine Corps. In succession these were 1st Battalion 5th Marines (2005); 3rd Battalion 7th Marines (2005-2006); and 3rd Battalion 8th Marines (2006).

2nd Brigade operated in al Anbar Province and received credit for aiding in the organization and training of Iraqi Security Forces, capturing terrorists, destroying insurgent groups, and destroying or disarming more than 1,100 improvised explosive devices.

January 2016 the Brigade Headquarter Mobilized for Duty in Kosovo. The Brigade assumed the command for Mult-National Battle Group East in March for KFOR-21 Rotation. Redeployed in November 2016.

In June 2016, 1st Battalion-110th Infantry Regiment deployed to Jordan, UAE, and Kuwait to train their forces.

== Organization 2025 ==
- 2nd Infantry Brigade Combat Team, in Washington
  - Headquarters and Headquarters Company, 2nd Infantry Brigade Combat Team, in Washington
  - 1st Squadron, 104th Cavalry Regiment, in Philadelphia
    - Headquarters and Headquarters Troop, 1st Squadron, 104th Cavalry Regiment, in Philadelphia
    - Troop A, 1st Squadron, 104th Cavalry Regiment, in Philadelphia
    - Troop B, 1st Squadron, 104th Cavalry Regiment, in Philadelphia
    - Troop C (Dismounted), 1st Squadron, 104th Cavalry Regiment, at Fort Indiantown Gap
  - 1st Battalion, 109th Infantry Regiment, in Scranton
    - Headquarters and Headquarters Company, 1st Battalion, 109th Infantry Regiment, in Scranton
    - Company A, 1st Battalion, 109th Infantry Regiment, in Honesdale
    - Company B, 1st Battalion, 109th Infantry Regiment, in Williamsport
    - Company C, 1st Battalion, 109th Infantry Regiment, in Easton
      - Detachment 1, Company C, 1st Battalion, 109th Infantry Regiment, in Tamaqua
    - Company D (Weapons), 1st Battalion, 109th Infantry Regiment, in Wellsboro
  - 1st Battalion, 110th Infantry Regiment, in Mount Pleasant
    - Headquarters and Headquarters Company, 1st Battalion, 110th Infantry Regiment, in Mount Pleasant
    - Company A, 1st Battalion, 110th Infantry Regiment, in Indiana
    - Company B, 1st Battalion, 110th Infantry Regiment, in Waynesburg
    - Company C, 1st Battalion, 110th Infantry Regiment, in Connellsville
    - Company D (Weapons), 1st Battalion, 110th Infantry Regiment, in Greensburg
  - 1st Battalion, 175th Infantry Regiment, in Dundalk (MD) — (Maryland Army National Guard)
    - Headquarters and Headquarters Company, 1st Battalion, 175th Infantry Regiment, in Dundalk
    - Company A, 1st Battalion, 175th Infantry Regiment, in Frederick
    - Company B, 1st Battalion, 175th Infantry Regiment, in Silver Spring
    - Company C, 1st Battalion, 175th Infantry Regiment, in Glen Burnie
    - Company D (Weapons), 1st Battalion, 175th Infantry Regiment, in Elkton
      - Detachment 1, Company D (Weapons), 1st Battalion, 175th Infantry Regiment, in Easton
  - 1st Battalion, 107th Field Artillery Regiment, in New Castle
    - Headquarters and Headquarters Battery, 1st Battalion, 107th Field Artillery Regiment, in New Castle
    - Battery A, 1st Battalion, 107th Field Artillery Regiment, in Hermitage
    - Battery B, 1st Battalion, 107th Field Artillery Regiment, in Beaver Falls
    - Battery C, 1st Battalion, 107th Field Artillery Regiment, in Grove City
  - 876th Brigade Engineer Battalion, at Johnstown–Cambria County Airport
    - Headquarters and Headquarters Company, 876th Brigade Engineer Battalion, at Johnstown–Cambria County Airport
    - Company A (Combat Engineer), 876th Brigade Engineer Battalion, in Hiller
    - Company B (Combat Engineer), 876th Brigade Engineer Battalion, in Spring City
    - Company C (Signal), 876th Brigade Engineer Battalion, in Washington
    - Company D (Military Intelligence), 876th Brigade Engineer Battalion, in Washington
      - Detachment 1, Company D (Military Intelligence), 876th Brigade Engineer Battalion, at Muir Army Heliport (RQ-28A UAV)
  - 128th Brigade Support Battalion, in Pittsburgh
    - Headquarters and Headquarters Company, 128th Brigade Support Battalion, in Pittsburgh
    - Company A (Distribution), 128th Brigade Support Battalion, in Clearfield
    - Company B (Maintenance), 128th Brigade Support Battalion, in Pittsburgh
    - Company C (Medical), 128th Brigade Support Battalion, in Pittsburgh
    - Company D (Forward Support), 128th Brigade Support Battalion, in Hershey — attached to 1st Squadron, 104th Cavalry Regiment
    - Company E (Forward Support), 128th Brigade Support Battalion, at Johnstown–Cambria County Airport — attached to 876th Brigade Engineer Battalion
    - Company F (Forward Support), 128th Brigade Support Battalion, in Ford City — attached to 1st Battalion, 107th Field Artillery Regiment
    - Company G (Forward Support), 128th Brigade Support Battalion, in Beaver Falls — attached to 1st Battalion, 110th Infantry Regiment
    - Company H (Forward Support), 128th Brigade Support Battalion, in Dundalk (MD) — attached to 1st Battalion, 175th Infantry Regiment (Maryland Army National Guard)
    - Company I (Forward Support), 128th Brigade Support Battalion, in Carbondale — attached to 1st Battalion, 109th Infantry Regiment
