= Jerry G. Beck Jr. =

US Army major general (born 1954)

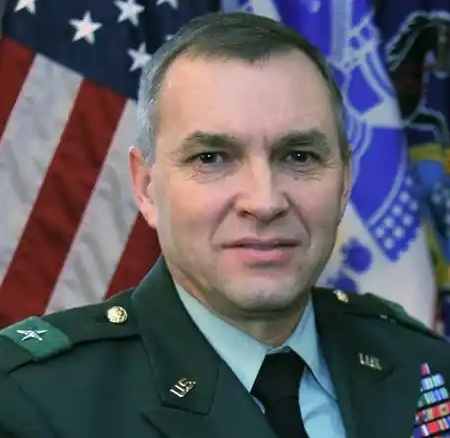
- Beck as a brigadier general in 2008
- Born: December 18, 1954 (age 71); Canonsburg, Pennsylvania, US
- Alma mater: Millersville University of Pennsylvania; West Chester State College; Pennsylvania State University; Capella University; United States Army Command and General Staff College; United States Army War College
- Spouse(s): Christine Marie Zinzel (m. 1975–2001) Gina Stewart
- Children: 1
- Military career
- Service: United States Army
- Service years: 1977–2011
- Rank: Brigadier General
- Unit: Pennsylvania Army National Guard
- Commands: 28th Infantry Division; Task Force Falcon, Kosovo Force; 1st Battalion, 111th Infantry Regiment; Company A, 1st Battalion, 111th Infantry
- Conflicts: Operation Joint Forge; Kosovo Force
- Awards: Army Distinguished Service Medal; Legion of Merit (3); Meritorious Service Medal (7); Joint Service Commendation Medal; Complete List
- Other work: Deputy garrison commander, Fort Indiantown Gap; Pennsylvania Deputy Adjutant General for Veterans Affairs

Jerry G. Beck Jr. (born 18 December 1954) is a retired United States Army officer. A career member of the Pennsylvania Army National Guard, he served from 1977 to 2011 and attained the rank of brigadier general as assistant division commander of the 28th Infantry Division from 2003 to 2006, division commander from 2006 to 2009, and Pennsylvania's assistant adjutant general for army from 2009 to 2011. A veteran of Operation Joint Forge in Bosnia and Herzegovina and the Kosovo Force, his awards included the Army Distinguished Service Medal, Legion of Merit with 2 bronze oak leaf clusters, the Meritorious Service Medal with one silver oak leaf cluster and one bronze oak leaf cluster, the Joint Service Commendation Medal and the Army Commendation Medal.

Beck was born in Canonsburg, Pennsylvania and graduated from Monongahela's Monongahela High School in 1972. In 1975, he graduated from Millersville State College (now Millersville University of Pennsylvania) with a bachelor's degree in German and in 1977 he received his certification as a Spanish language teacher from West Chester State College (now West Chester University). He worked in retail management for three years and as a high school teacher for four before beginning his full-time military career.

Beck enlisted in the Pennsylvania Army National Guard in 1977 and was trained as a personnel management specialist. He graduated from officer candidate school in 1979 and was a traditional part-time member of the National Guard until 1984; during this period, his assignments included: platoon leader, company commander, and assistant plans operations and training officer (S-3) with 1st Battalion, 111th Infantry Regiment. As a full-time military member, he served in staff and command positions of increasing rank and responsibility, including commander of 1st Battalion, 111th Infantry and chief of staff at Pennsylvania's State Area Command. In 1995, he completed a master of science degree in instructional systems design at Pennsylvania State University.

In 2003, Beck was promoted to brigadier general and he served successively as assistant division commander of the 28th Infantry Division, commander of the 28th Division, and assistant adjutant general for army. Beck's career as a general officer also included deputy commander of the Operation Joint Forge task force in Bosnia and Hercegovina from 2002 to 2003 and commander of the Kosovo Force's Task Force Falcon in 2003 and 2004. Beck completed a PhD at Capella University in 2011. After retiring from the military, he served as the civilian deputy commander of the Fort Indiantown Gap garrison from 2011 to 2013. In 2013, he was appointed Pennsylvania's civilian deputy adjutant general for veterans affairs, and he served until retiring again in November 2016.

== Early life ==
Jerry Gene Beck Jr. was born in Canonsburg, Pennsylvania on 18 December 1954, a son of Jerry G. Beck and Gladys L. Davidson Beck. His parents later divorced, and his mother married Donald A. Stewart Sr. Beck was raised and educated in western Pennsylvania locales including Library, and he graduated from Monongahela's Monongahela High School in 1972. After high school, Beck attended Millersville State College, from which he graduated in 1975 with a BS degree in German. In 1977, he received his Spanish language teaching certification from West Chester State College.

Beck worked in retail management for JCPenney from 1977 to 1980. From 1980 to 1984, he was a high school Spanish and German teacher. In July 1977, Beck joined the Pennsylvania Army National Guard. Trained initially as a personnel management specialist, he served as an enlisted soldier until completing the officer candidate school program of instruction in 1979. After graduation, Beck received his commission as a second lieutenant of Infantry.

=== Military education ===
Beck's professional military education included:

- Infantry Officer Basic Course
- Infantry Officer Advanced Course
- Combined Arms and Services Staff School
- United States Army Command and General Staff College
- United States Army War College
- Air University Senior Information Warfare Applications Course

== Early career ==
After receiving his commission, Beck was assigned as a platoon leader with the Pennsylvania Army National Guard's headquarters detachment, where he served from May 1979 to December 1980. From December 1980 to May 1982, he was a rifle platoon leader with Company B, 1st Battalion, 111th Infantry Regiment. He served as Company B's weapons platoon leader from May to September 1982. He was then assigned to command of 1st Battalion's Company A, where he remained until May 1984.

Beck served as assistant plans, operations, and training officer (S3) for 1-111th Infantry from June to August 1984, then as the battalion's logistics staff officer (S4) from August 1984 to August 1985. From August 1985 to April 1988 he was assistant S4 on the staff of the 56th Infantry Brigade. He served as the 56th Brigade's S3 from May 1988 to May 1992, and as the brigade's personnel staff officer (S1) from May to March 1993. From March 1993 to February 1994, Beck was assigned as the 56th Brigade's intelligence staff officer (S2).

Beck served as assistant chief of staff for plans, operations and training (G3) on the staff of the 28th Infantry Division from February 1994 to September 1995. He received a master of science degree in instructional systems design from Pennsylvania State University in 1995. From September 1995 to October 1998, he was commander of 1st Battalion, 111th Infantry Regiment. He was director of operations (G3) on the staff of Pennsylvania's State Area Command (STARC) from November 1998 to November 2000. Beck belonged to several professional associations, including the Veterans of Foreign Wars, National Guard Association of the United States, Military Officers Association of America, Association of the United States Army, Reserve Officers Association and the American Legion.

== Continued career ==
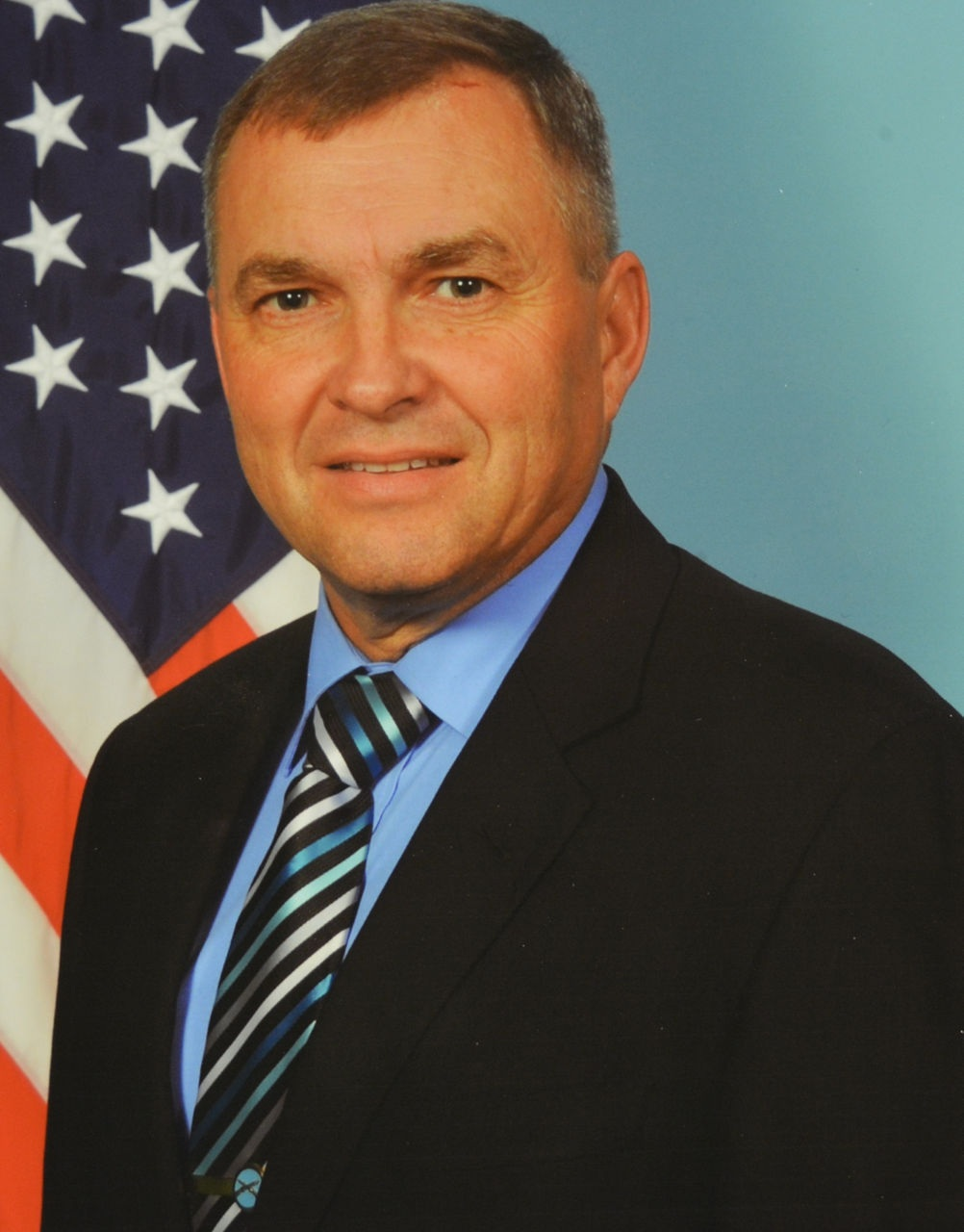
Beck at the time of his 2017 induction into the Pennsylvania DMVA Hall of Fame

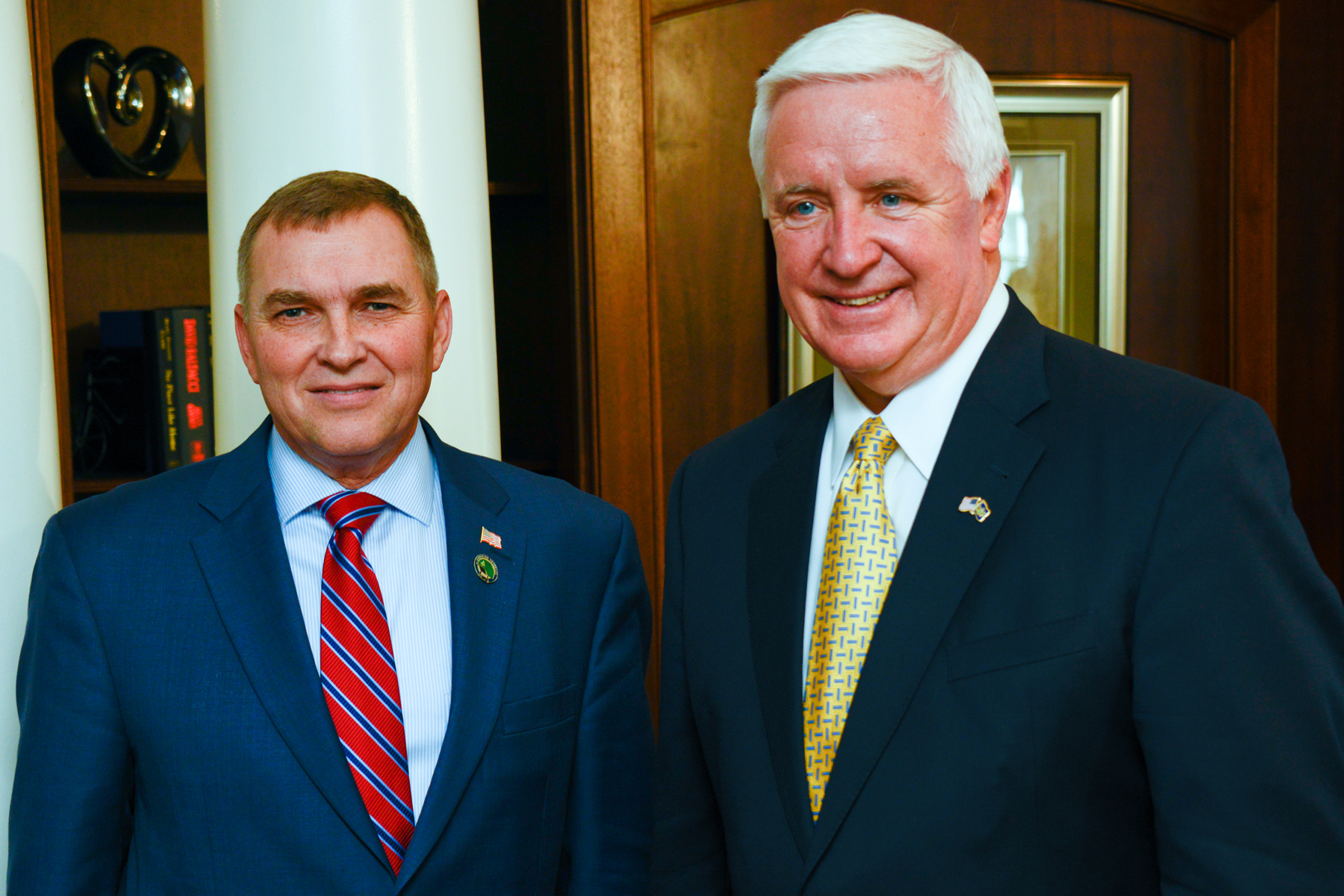
Beck with Governor Tom Corbett at a 2014 bill signing

In November 2000, he was assigned as STARC's chief of staff, and he remained in this position until July 2002. From July 2002 to February 2003, Beck served as deputy commander of Pennsylvania's Operation Joint Forge task force, which performed duty in Bosnia and Herzegovina.

From February to March 2003, Beck was assigned as assistant division commander of the 28th Infantry Division, and he was promoted to brigadier general in March 2003. From March 2003 to April 2004, Beck commanded Task Force Falcon, the Pennsylvania task force that took part in the Kosovo Force mission. In April 2004, he resumed his duties as assistant division commander of the 28th Infantry Division, and he served in this assignment until October 2006.

In October 2006, Beck was assigned as commanding general of the 28th Infantry Division and he served in this position until June 2009. He was Pennsylvania's assistant adjutant general for army from June 2009 until retiring from the military in August 2011. After retiring from the military, Beck was the civilian deputy commander of the garrison at Fort Indiantown Gap from 2011 to 2013. In 2011, he completed a PhD in organization and management with a concentration in leadership at Capella University. He served as Pennsylvania's civilian deputy adjutant general for veterans affairs from 2013 until retiring again in November 2016. Beck was a resident of Denver early in his military career, and later resided in Hummelstown and Shermans Dale.

== Awards ==
=== Federal ===
Beck's federal awards included:

- Army Distinguished Service Medal
- Legion of Merit with 2 bronze oak leaf clusters
- Meritorious Service Medal with 1 silver oak leaf cluster and 1 bronze oak leaf cluster
- Joint Service Commendation Medal
- Army Commendation Medal
- Army Achievement Medal
- Army Reserve Component Achievement Medal with 1 silver oak leaf cluster and 1 bronze oak leaf cluster
- National Defense Service Medal with 1 bronze star
- Armed Forces Expeditionary Medal
- Kosovo Campaign Medal
- Global War on Terrorism Service Medal
- Armed Forces Reserve Medal with gold hourglass and M device with numeral 2
- Army Service Ribbon
- Army Reserve Components Overseas Training Ribbon with numeral 2
- North Atlantic Treaty Organization Medal with 1 bronze star
- Army Meritorious Unit Commendation

=== State ===
Among Beck's state awards were:

- Pennsylvania Distinguished Service Medal
- Pennsylvania Commendation Medal
- Pennsylvania Service Ribbon with numeral 3
- Pennsylvania Twenty Year Service Medal with 2 silver stars
- Major General Thomas R. White Jr. Medal
- General Thomas J. Stewart Medal
- Governor's Unit Citation
- The Adjutant General's Staff Identification Badge

=== Other ===
Beck was a 2006 recipient of the National Infantry Association's Order of Saint Maurice (Primicerius). In 2017, Beck was inducted into the Pennsylvania Department of Military and Veterans Affairs Hall of Fame.

== Dates of rank ==
Beck's effective dates of rank were:

- Brigadier General (Retired), 31 August 2011
- Brigadier General, 1 March 2003
- Colonel, 5 March 1999
- Lieutenant Colonel, 23 March 1994
- Major, 16 October 1988
- Captain, 11 October 1983
- First Lieutenant, 26 May 1982
- Second Lieutenant, 27 May 1979
