= Bearskin Neck =

Cape in Essex County, Massachusetts, United States

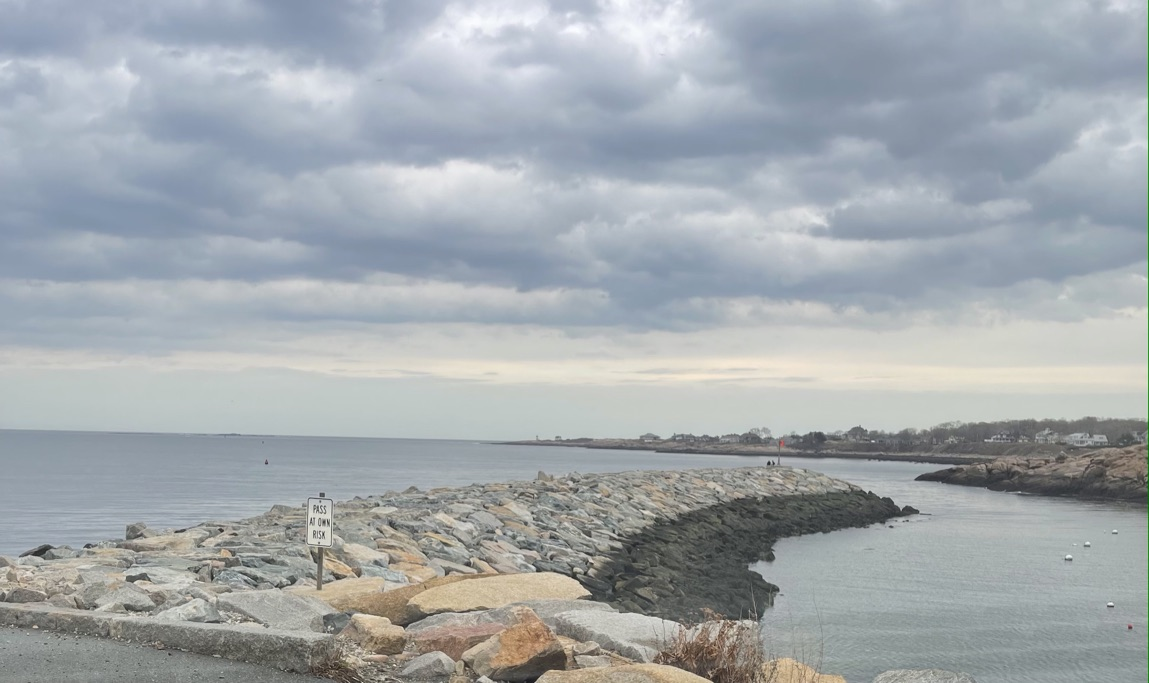
View of the Bearskin Neck peninsula.

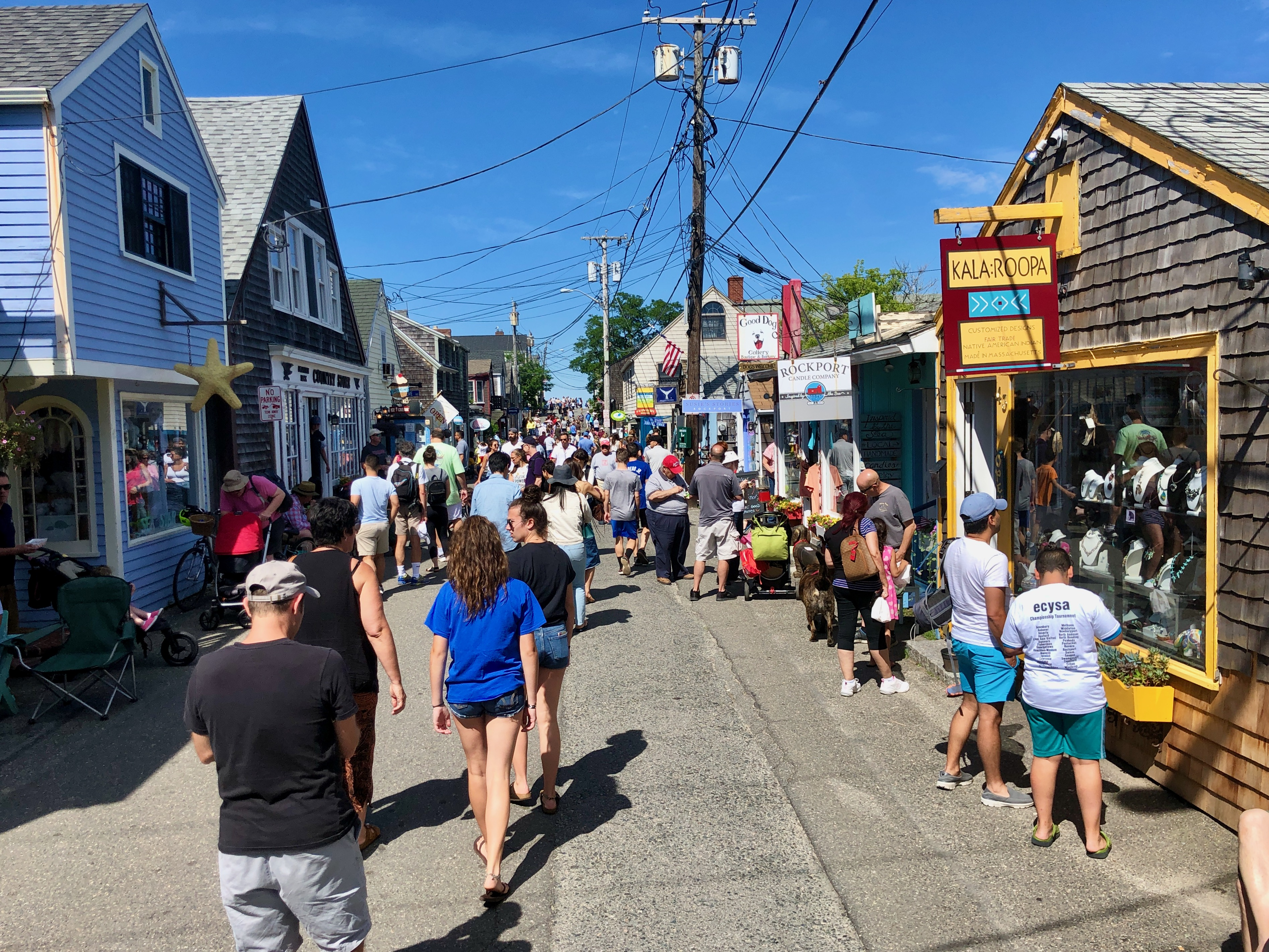
Bearskin Neck Shops in Rockport, MA

Bearskin Neck is a peninsula located on the coastline of Cape Ann in Rockport, Massachusetts. The location played a vital role during the War of 1812. Today it is a tourist destination known for its shops and art galleries. The stores and restaurants are known for jewelry, local artwork, and fresh seafood.

== History ==
In the early 1600s, Rockport was established based on fishing and its granite quarries. Their rocks were exported globally and gave the area its name. With its geographical shape and convenience, Bearskin Neck was a commercial harbor for many industries, a factor in the economic growth of the city.

=== Name origin ===
According to local legend, Ebenezer Babson was attacked by a bear. With nothing but a knife, he backed the bear down to the shoreline into the oncoming tide. He fought the bear with his knife, and he eventually won. Babson then skinned the bear and laid the bearskin out on the rocks for all to witness. The fisherman passing by then gave the land the name Bearskin Neck.

=== War of 1812 ===
Due to its prime location, Bearskin Neck served as lookout barracks during the War of 1812. The barracks housed sixty men and were known as the Sea Fencibles. The battle at Bearskin Neck played a vital role on September 8, 1814. The British silently sent a fleet of men coming from the British ship, Nymph, onto the shores of Rockport, landing on Bearskin Neck. The British managed to capture fourteen soldiers. When the locals realized what was happening, alarms rang from the bells of the Congregational Church. The British attempted to silence the makeshift siren. The British fired a cannonball. It remains lodged in the bell tower today. Using the advantages of Bearskin Neck surrounding Sandy Bay, the local militia drove the British out of the Bay and retreat into the Atlantic. Today, the barracks, known as the Old Stone Fort of the Sea Fencibles, still stand at the point of Bearskin Neck.

=== Motif Number 1 ===
Motif Number 1 is a building that stands in the heart of Bearskin Neck and Rockport Harbor. Built-in the mid-1800s to house fishing gear, the red building has become the symbol of Rockport. The character of the building has created an artistic attraction; it is "the most often-painted building in America." The original structure was blown into Rockport Harbor and destroyed during the Northeastern United States blizzard of 1978. The town built a replica of the building. The building has become so iconic that it has previously been transported to different locations, incorporated in parades. The float was entered and won first prize at the Chicago World's Fair in 1933.

=== Granite shipping ===
Rockport received its name from its natural port for exporting granite. Ships would dock and load granite in Bearskin Neck. There are multiple quarries in Rockport that produce granite, including Steele Derrick and Johnson's Quarry. Steele Derrick is no longer in use, as the mining company hit a natural spring at the bottom of the pit, causing over two miles worth of depth to be filled with water. It is now a privately owned swimming area for residents. Johnson's Quarry is still in use today. Although, the quarry is also now full of water. The current owners, which remained in the Johnson family, are still mining granite the old-fashioned way. They drive stakes into the granite to split them into pieces.

=== Appearance in films ===
Bearskin Neck has been used as the backdrop for several films over the years, including the 2009 film The Proposal, which starred Sandra Bullock, Ryan Reynolds, and Betty White.

== See also ==
- Thacher Island
