= Fencibles (United States) =

Type of military unit

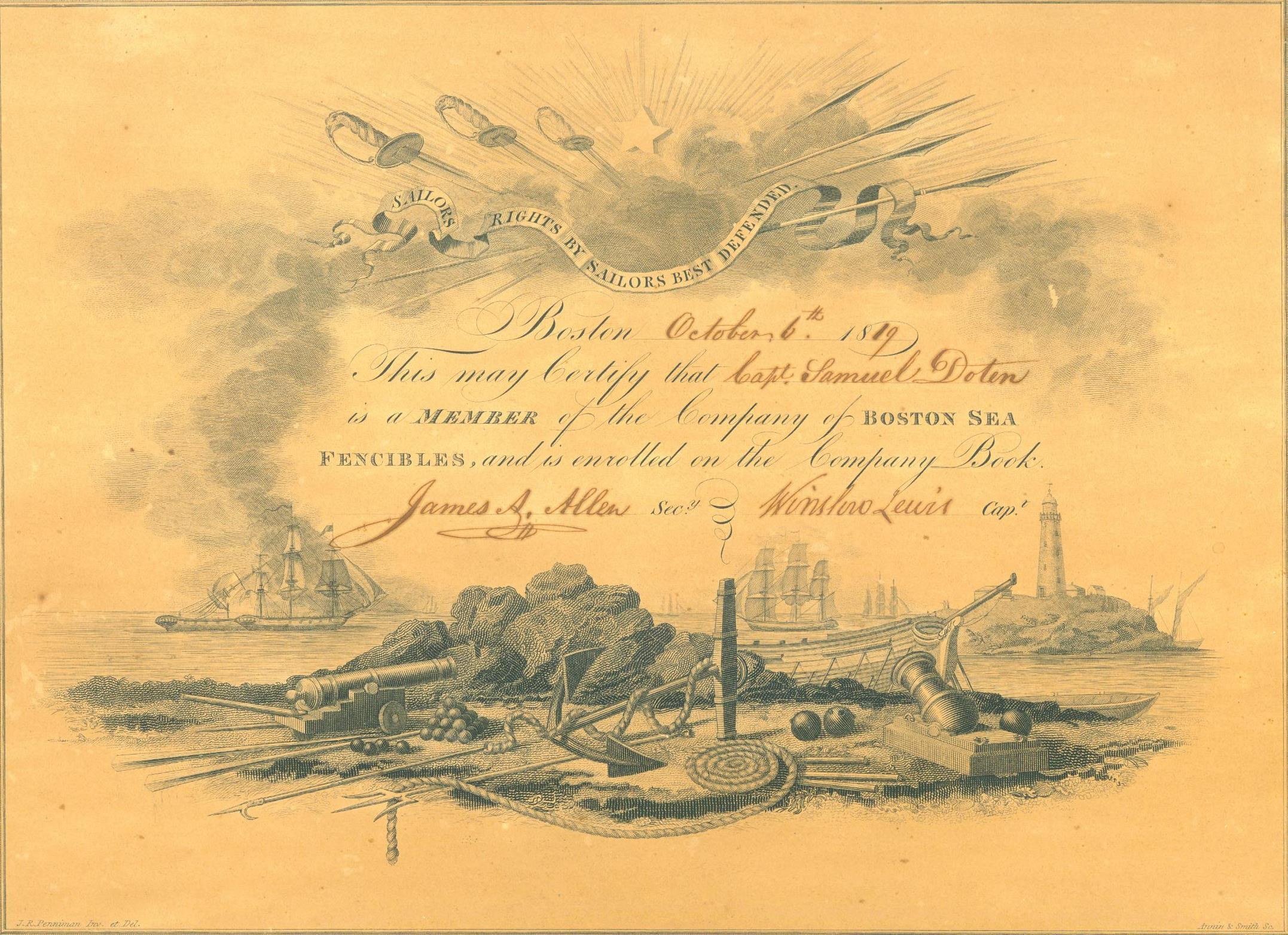
Certificate of membership of Boston Sea Fencibles dated 1819. Preserved in the United States Marine Corps Archive.

A number of units used fencibles in their title before and during the American Civil War. Example include the Texas Fencibles and the Bellefonte Fencibles (one of the ancestor units of the 112th Regiment). A Texas unit called the Panther City Fencibles existed from 1883 to 1898, and a modern Texas State Guard unit has used the name since 1993. The Old Guard State Fencibles existed in Philadelphia from 1812 through 1981.

In Britain where the term originated, "fencibles" (a shortening of defencible) designated a special type of regiment raised for home defense (usually garrison duty), therefore freeing better trained Line Regiments of that task and enabling them to be deployed overseas.

== See also ==
- Sea Fencibles (American)
