= Michael E. Wegscheider =

US Army major general

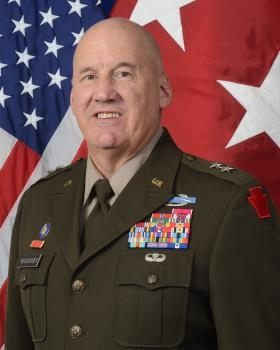
- Wegscheider in 2025
- Born: 1968 (age 57–58); Doylestown, Pennsylvania, US
- Alma mater: Villanova University; United States Army Command and General Staff College; United States Army War College
- Spouse: Dawn Fronheiser
- Children: 2
- Military career
- Service: United States Army
- Service years: 1986–Present
- Rank: Major General
- Unit: Pennsylvania Army National Guard
- Commands: 28th Infantry Division; 56th Stryker Brigade Combat Team; 1st Battalion, 111th Infantry Regiment; Company B, 1st Battalion, 111th Infantry Regiment
- Conflicts: Kosovo Force; Iraq War
- Awards: Legion of Merit; Bronze Star Medal; Meritorious Service Medal (3); Army Commendation Medal (3); Army Achievement Medal (3)
- Other work: Law enforcement officer, Pennsylvania State Police

Michael E. Wegscheider (born 1968) is a career officer in the United States Army. A longtime member of the Pennsylvania Army National Guard, in 2024 he was promoted to major general and assigned to command the 28th Infantry Division. A veteran of the Kosovo Force mission and the Iraq War, his awards include the Legion of Merit, Bronze Star Medal, three awards of the Meritorious Service Medal, three awards of the Army Commendation Medal, and three awards of the Army Achievement Medal.

A native of Doylestown, Pennsylvania, Wegscheider graduated from Villanova University in 1992. An enlisted veteran of the Pennsylvania Army National Guard, in 1990 he received his commission as a second lieutenant of Infantry. He advanced through command and staff positions of increasing rank and responsibility while pursuing a civilian career with the Pennsylvania State Police, and is a graduate of the United States Army Command and General Staff College and the United States Army War College.

Among Wegscheider's command assignments were: Company B, 1st Battalion, 111th Infantry Regiment; 1st Battalion, 111th Infantry Regiment; and 56th Stryker Brigade Combat Team. In 2024, he was promoted to major general and assigned to command of the 28th Infantry Division. In 2025, he was appointed as Pennsylvania's deputy adjutant general for army.

== Early life ==
Michael Eric Wegscheider was born in Doylestown, Pennsylvania in 1968, the son of Larry Richard Wegscheider and Ann Elizabeth (Cooper) Wegscheider. He graduated from Villanova University in 1992 with a Bachelor of Science degree in economics. Wegscheider subsequently became a resident of Boyertown and joined the Pennsylvania State Police, where he attained the rank of sergeant and carried out assignments including firearms instructor and supervisor of the Risk and Vulnerability Assessment Team (RVAT). Wegscheider retired from the state police in 2022.

== Start of military career ==
Wegscheider completed the Army Reserve Officers' Training Corps program and served in the Pennsylvania Army National Guard while attending Villanova University, and he advanced to the noncommissioned officer ranks. He received his commission as a second lieutenant of Infantry in 1990. After a brief period assigned to the United States Army Reserve's Control Group, in July 1990 he joined the Pennsylvania Army National Guard and was assigned as a platoon leader with Company A, 2nd Battalion, 111th Infantry Regiment in West Chester. In 1992, he graduated from the Infantry Officer Basic Course.

In May 1993, Wegscheider was promoted to first lieutenant, and in June he was appointed support platoon leader of 2nd Battalion, 111th Infantry Regiment in Spring City. From June 1994 to September 1995, Wegscheider served as a platoon leader with Company A, 1st Battalion, 111th Infantry in West Chester. From September 1995 to January 1997, he was a platoon leader with Company B, 1st Battalion, 111th Infantry. From January to June 1997, he was Company B's executive officer, and from June 1997 to December 2000 he commanded the company. He was promoted to captain in June 1999.

== Continued military career ==
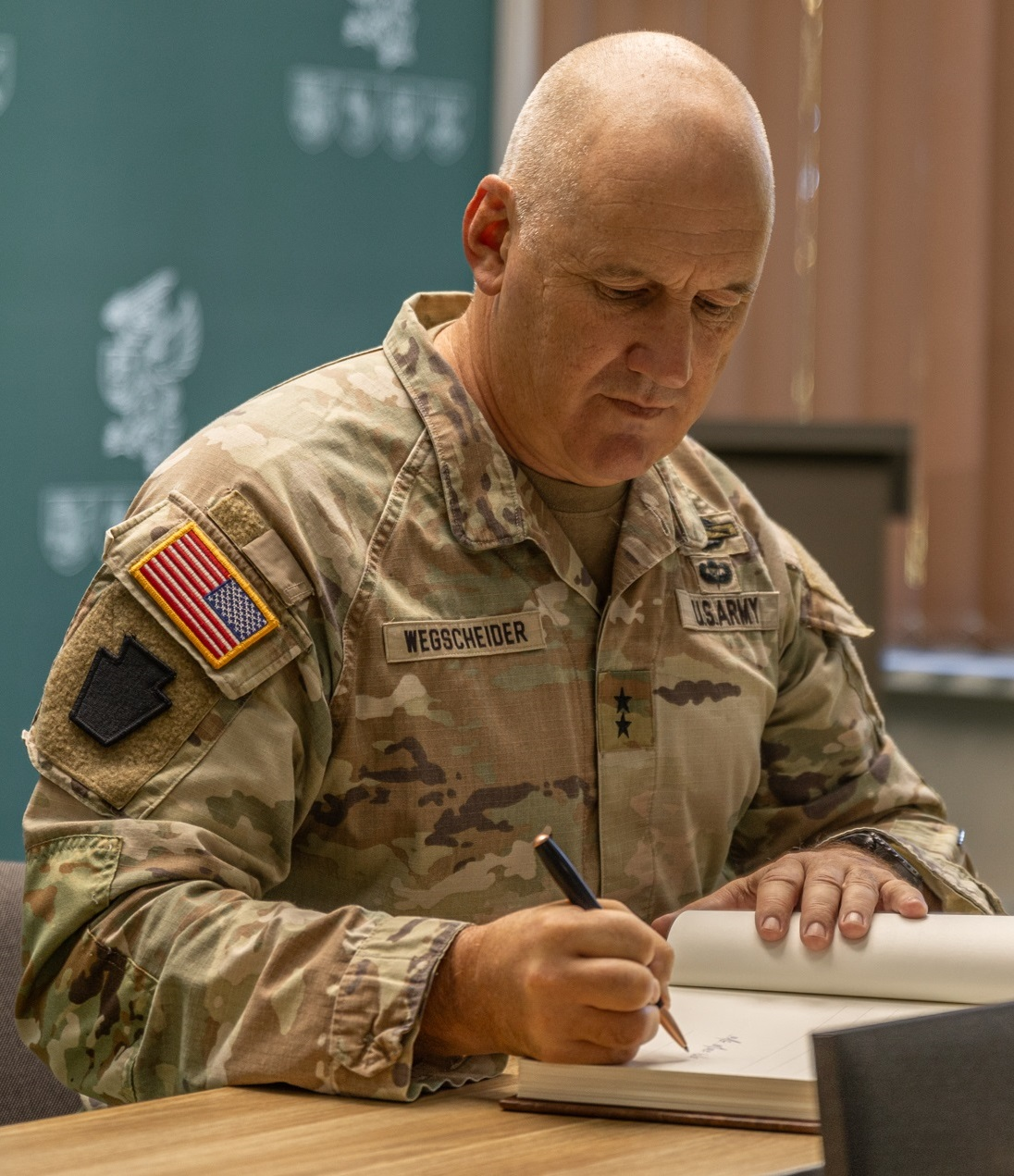
Wegscheider seated at desk during visit to Lithuania in 2024

From December 2000 to December 2001, Wegscheider served as communications-electronics officer on the staff of 1st Battalion, 111th Infantry in Plymouth Meeting. He served as the battalion's maintenance officer from December 2001 to June 2002. From June 2002 to September 2003, he was assigned as the battalion's logistics staff officer (S-4), including deployment to Camp Monteith, Kosovo as part of the Kosovo Force mission. From September 2003 to April 2004, he served at Camp Monteith as 1st Battalion, 111th Infantry's plans officer (Assistant S-3). After returning to the United States, he served as 1st Battalion's Assistant S-3 until September 2005. He graduated from the Infantry Captains Career Course in 2004.

Wegscheider served as plans, operations, and training officer (S-3) for 1st Battalion, 111th Infantry from September 2005 to December 2006, and he was promoted to major in December 2005. From December 2006 to January 2010, he was assigned the battalion's executive officer, including deployment to Camp Taji during the Iraq War. In 2008, he completed the Combined Arms Exercise Course, and in 2009 he graduated from the United States Army Command and General Staff College. From January 2010 to October 2013, he commanded 1st Battalion, and he was promoted to lieutenant colonel in August 2010.

From October 2013 to November 2014, Wegscheider was posted to the 28th Infantry Division headquarters in Harrisburg as the current operations chief. In 2014, he completed the United States Army War College program and received his Master of Strategic Studies degree. From November 2014 to December 2016, he was executive officer of the 55th Infantry Brigade Combat Team in Scranton. From December 2015 to December 2016, he served at Camp Bondsteel, Kosovo as deputy commander of the 28th Division's 2nd Infantry Brigade Combat Team.

== Later career ==
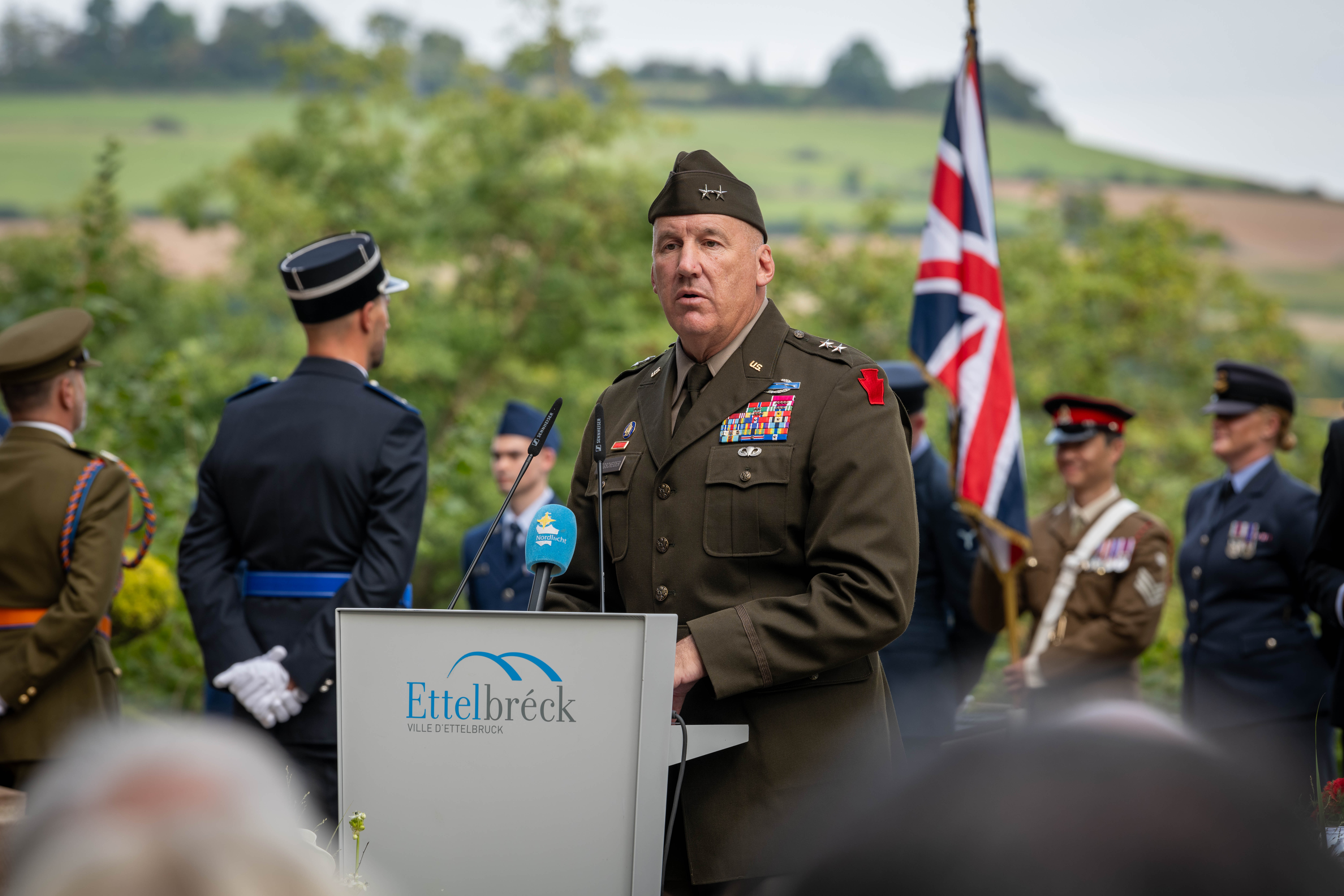
Wegschider at Ettelbruck, Luxembourg's 80th anniversary of WWII liberation

From November 2016 to April 2017, Wegscheider served as deputy commander of the 55th Maneuver Enhancement Brigade, and he was promoted to colonel in April 2017. In 2017, Wegscheider also completed the Maneuver Commanders Pre-Command Course. From April 2017 to May 2020, he commanded the 56th Stryker Brigade Combat Team in Horsham. In 2018, he graduated from the Joint Task Force Commander Training Course.

In May 2020, Wegscheider was promoted to brigadier general and assigned as the 28th Infantry Division's assistant division commander for support (ADC-S). In June 2021, he was appointed the division's assistant division commander for maneuver (ADC-M). In March 2024, Wegscheider was promoted to major general and assigned as commander of the 28th Infantry Division. In October 2025, he was appointed as the Pennsylvania National Guard's deputy adjutant general for army. He was succeeded as division commander by Brigadier General Reece J. Lutz.

== Awards ==
Wegscheider's awards and decorations include:

- Legion of Merit
- Bronze Star Medal
- Meritorious Service Medal with 2 bronze oak leaf clusters
- Army Commendation Medal with 2 bronze oak leaf clusters
- Army Achievement Medal with 2 bronze oak leaf clusters
- Army Meritorious Unit Commendation
- Army Good Conduct Medal
- Army Reserve Components Achievement Medal with 1 silver oak leaf cluster and 3 bronze oak leaf clusters
- National Defense Service Medal with 1 bronze service star
- Armed Forces Expeditionary Medal
- Kosovo Campaign Medal with 1 bronze service star
- Iraq Campaign Medal with 1 bronze service star
- Global War on Terrorism Service Medal
- Humanitarian Service Medal
- Armed Forces Reserve Medal with 1 silver hourglass, M device and numeral 2
- Non-Commissioned Officer Professional Development Ribbon
- Army Service Ribbon
- Overseas Service Ribbon
- Army Reserve Components Overseas Training Ribbon with numeral 5
- North Atlantic Treaty Organization Medal with 1 bronze service star
- Combat Infantryman Badge
- Parachutist Badge

== Effective dates of promotion ==
The effective dates of Wegscheider's promotions are:

- Major General, March 9, 2024
- Brigadier General, May 14, 2020
- Colonel, April 1, 2017
- Lieutenant Colonel, August 9, 2010
- Major, December 21, 2005
- Captain, June 4, 1999
- First Lieutenant, May 30, 1993
- Second Lieutenant, May 11, 1990
