= 112th Infantry Regiment (United States) =

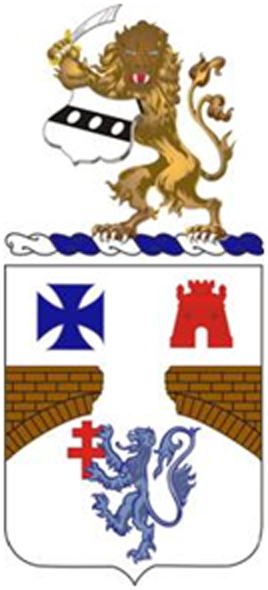
- Coat of arms
- Active: 1878
- Allegiance: United States of America
- Branch: United States Army
- Type: Infantry
- Role: Stryker
- Garrison/HQ: 1st Battalion: Cambridge Springs, PA; 2nd Battalion: Lewistown, PA
- Nickname: Sixteenth Pennsylvania (special designation)
- Mottos: Strive, Obey, Endure
- Engagements: American Civil War; War with Spain; World War I World War II; Operation Iraqi Freedom
- Decorations: Distinguished Unit Citation with oak leaf Meritorious Unit Commendation Governor's Unit Citation

Commanders
- Current commander: 1st Battalion: LTC Gerald Mothes; 2nd Battalion: LTC Max Furman Jr.
- Notable commanders: John A. Wiley; George C. Rickards; James A. Shannon; Henry I. Hodes; Gustin M. Nelson; Philip W. Merrill

Insignia
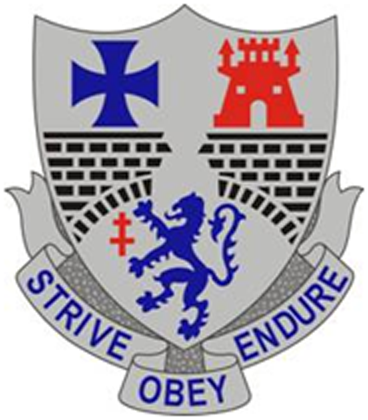
- Distinctive unit insignia

The 112th Infantry Regiment, also known as the Sixteenth Pennsylvania, is a unit in the Pennsylvania National Guard which can trace its lineage back to before the American Civil War.

== Heraldic items ==
=== Coat of arms ===
==== Blazon ====
- Shield: argent, issuant in fess a bridge of one arch proper masoned sable, the center portion shot away, in chief a cross patée azure and a Spanish castle gules; in base a lion rampant of the third grasping a cross of Lorraine of the fourth.
- Crest: that for the regiments and separate battalions of the Pennsylvania Army National Guard: From a wreath argent and azure, a lion rampant guardant proper holding in dexter paw a naked scimitar of the first, hilted or and in sinister an escutcheon of the first on a fess sable three plates.
- Motto: Strive, Obey, Endure.

==== Symbolism ====
- Shield:
1. In 1951, a rampant lion as found on the arms of Belgium and the Grand Duchy of Luxembourg grasping a red cross of the province of Lorraine in France were added to the old coat of arms of the 112th Infantry Regiment.
2. The lion is in the infantry color and both symbols represent the locale of the regiment's combat in World War II.
3. The shield is white, the old infantry color.
4. Service in the Civil War is shown by the cross patée, the badge of the 5th Corps, 3rd Division, in which the organization served in that war.
5. The Spanish castle indicates service in Puerto Rico during the Spanish–American War, while the bridge, which is a representation of the bridge over the Vesle River at Fismes, France where the regiment saw its hardest fighting, symbolizes service in World War I.
- Crest: The crest is that of the Pennsylvania Army National Guard.
- Background:
1. The coat of arms was approved on 2 January 1930.
2. It was amended to show additional war service on 29 August 1951.
3. The insignia was amended to correct the blazon on 16 May 2008.

=== Distinctive unit insignia ===
==== Description ====
- A Silver color metal and enamel device 1 5/32 inches (2.9 cm) in height overall consisting of shield blazoned: argent (silver gray), issuant in fess a bridge of one arch sable masoned of the first, the center portion shot away, in chief a cross patée azure and a Spanish castle gules; in base a lion rampant of the third grasping a cross of Lorraine of the fourth. Attached below and to the sides of the shield a Silver scroll inscribed "STRIVE OBEY ENDURE" in blue letters.

==== Symbolism and background ====
The symbolism of the distinctive unit insignia is the same as that of the coat of arms. The dates of its approval and amendment are also the same.

== History ==
The 1st Battalion, 112th Infantry Regiment draws its origins from Civil War era units, including the 13th, 15th, and 17th Pennsylvania Regiments and still maintains the right to possess the silver bands and battle streamers awarded for battle service in the Peninsula and Virginia 1861–1863 campaigns and for participation in the battles of Manassas, Antietam, Fredericksburg, Gettysburg, the Wilderness, and Spottsylvania. On 22 November 1878, the battalion was organized as the 16th Regiment, Pennsylvania National Guard. The regiment consisted of companies from Erie, McKean, Venango, Elk, Warren, and Crawford counties. The units were located in Erie (Co A), Bradford (Co C), Oil City (Co D), Cooperstown (Co E), Franklin (Co F), Ridgeway, Pennsylvania (Co H), Warren (Co I), and Titusville (Co K).

The 2nd Battalion, 112th Infantry Regiment's heritage can be traced back to the Logan Guards (Lewistown) and the Bellefonte Fencibles, both organized in 1858. These units were mustered into federal service during the American Civil War. The Logan Guards were mustered as Company E, 25th Pennsylvania Volunteers and then as Company A, 46th Pennsylvania Volunteers. The Bellefonte Fencibles were mustered as Company H, 2nd Pennsylvania Volunteers. These units combined have 17 campaign streamers from the American Civil War: Po Valley, Manassas, Antietam, Chancellorsville, Gettysburg, Atlanta, Fredericksburg, Vicksburg, the Wilderness, Spottsylvania, Cold Harbor, Petersburg, Battle of Appomattox, Virginia 1861, South Carolina 1862, Mississippi 1863, Tennessee 1863.

In July 1865, these units were mustered out of federal service.

=== Spanish–American War (1st Battalion) ===
Designated as the 16th Regiment, Pennsylvania Volunteer Infantry, the unit was mobilized on 28 April 1898 and activated into federal service for the Spanish–American War on 10 May 1898 at their mobilization site, Mount Gretna, Pennsylvania. They sailed to Puerto Rico on 5 July 1898 and served with the 1st Brigade, 1st Division, 1st Army Corps throughout the campaign. The unit was noted for actions in the Battle of Coamo, where the regiment sustained six wounded and one killed in action during a blocking action. The unit was awarded the battle streamer marked Puerto Rico for their service. They were mustered out of federal service in December 1898.

=== World War I ===
George C. Rickards, a career Pennsylvania National Guard officer, was promoted to colonel as commander of the 16th Pennsylvania in 1907. On 3 July 1916, the regiment was called to service for Mexican border duty, with Rickards still in command. The unit was transported to and garrisoned at El Paso, Texas for training, but was never utilized because hostilities ended.

The unit was mustered into federal service on 16 July 1917 for service in World War I, and Rickards remained its commander. On 11 October 1917 the 16th Pennsylvania Regiment was redesignated as the 112th Infantry Regiment and became part of the 28th Infantry Division. The 112th was the first war-strength National Guard regiment in the United States. The regiment reached France in May 1918 as part of the American Expeditionary Force. It went onto the line on 4 July 1918, in the Second Battle of the Marne. From that day on, the names Fismes, Fismette, Fond de Mezieres, and Forest of Argonne Argonne would never be forgotten. The second battalion's Companies G and H lost a combined total of 200 men out of 230 when they were cut off at Fismette and fended off a frontal attack on their position by a thousand German soldiers. The 112th Infantry Regiment returned home in April 1919 and was mustered out of federal service on 6 May 1919 at Camp Dix, New Jersey. The regiment was awarded battle streamers marked Champagne 1918, Champagne-Marne, Aisne-Marne, Oise-Marne, Lorraine 1918, and Meuse-Argonne for its service in France.

Rickards was promoted to brigadier general in 1919, and in 1921 he was promoted to major general and appointed Chief of the Militia Bureau, the first National Guard officer to hold the position.

=== Interwar period ===
The 112th Infantry arrived at the port of Newport News on 4 May 1919 on the troopship USS Mercury and was demobilized 6 May 1919 at Fort Dix Camp Dix, New Jersey. Per the terms of the National Defense Act of 1920, the regiment was reconstituted in the National Guard in 1921, assigned to the 28th Division, and allotted to the state of Pennsylvania. It was reorganized on 1 April 1921 by redesignation of the 16th Infantry, Pennsylvania National Guard (organized on 16 October 1919; headquarters organized on 30 July 1920 and federally recognized at Grove City, Pennsylvania) as the 112th Infantry. It participated in the 150th anniversary of Siege of Yorktown Cornwallis’ surrender at Yorktown, Virginia, in October 1931. The 2nd Battalion was called up for strike duty in the coal fields around Brownsville, Pennsylvania, in June 1933. The entire regiment called up to perform relief duties in connection with the flooding of the Schuylkill River Schuylkill and Susquehanna Rivers in April 1936. The regimental headquarters was relocated 1 August 1937 to Kane, Pennsylvania. The regiment conducted annual summer training most years at Mount Gretna, Pennsylvania, 1921–34 and Indiantown Gap, Pennsylvania, 1935–38. The regiment was inducted into federal service on 17 February 1941 and moved to Indiantown Gap, where it arrived on 27 February 1941.

=== World War II ===
The regiment was again called to active federal service on 17 February 1941, 10 months prior to the attack on Pearl Harbor. After years of training, the unit first entered the continent of Europe on the Normandy beaches following the D-Day landing. It became the 112th Infantry Regimental Combat Team which consisted of the 112th Infantry Regiment, the 229th Field Artillery Battalion, the 103rd Engineer Battalion, Company C, 447th Antiaircraft Artillery Battalion, and Company C, 630th Tank Destroyer Battalion. 28th Division commander James E. Wharton was in his first day of command when a German sniper shot him while he was at the 112th Infantry's command post. The regiment plowed through France and Germany, participating in the capture of Paris and the bitter fighting in the Huertgen Forest. At one point, after the fight for Kommerscheidt, the regiment was reduced to 300 men. During December 1944, the 112th Infantry Regimental Combat Team was holding a 6-1/2-mile long sector which the Germans attacked with nine divisions. The unit inflicted 1600 casualties and destroyed eighteen tanks during nine days of continuous action, that was later known as the Battle of the Bulge. The regiment was awarded battle streamers marked Normandy, Northern France, Ardennes-Alsace, Rhineland, and Central Europe for its service in World War II. The unit was also awarded the Distinguished Unit Citation for its actions during the Battle of the Bulge, from 16 to 24 December 1944. The unit was mustered out of federal service on 6 December 1945 at Camp Gordon, Georgia.

The 112th remained an organic unit of the 28th Infantry Division throughout World War II.

=== Operation Iraqi Freedom ===
In 2004–2005, A Company, 1st Battalion, was deployed with Task Force Dragoon to Tikrit Iraq.

Both the 1st and 2d Battalions deployed with the rest of the 56th Stryker Brigade Combat Team on 19 September 2008. They conducted full spectrum operations in and around Baghdad, Iraq. The main body of the 1st Battalion was stationed at Camp Taji while the main body of the 2d was stationed at Camp Liberty on the Victory Base Complex. The 2d Battalion's Civilian Military Operations unit (S-9) oversaw the distribution of roughly $20 million to the Iraqi people in efforts to stabilize the Iraqi economy and build public works projects including police stations, schools, hospitals, fire departments, youth centers, and water pumping stations. The 56th redeployed to America toward the end of 2009.

=== Timeline (2nd Battalion) ===
- On 25 April 1861, Company G, The Monongahela Artillery (Everett) was mustered into federal service for the American Civil War as part of the 12th Pennsylvania Volunteers. It was mustered out of federal service in August 1861 and mustered back into federal service in September 1861 as Company D of the 79th Pennsylvania Volunteers. It was again mustered out of federal service in July 1865. In July 1869 it was reorganized as Hazzards Zouaves.
- On 5 April 1877, Company C, 5th Pennsylvania Infantry (Altoona) was organized.
- On 15 July 1871, Sheridan Troop (Tyrone) was organized.
- In 1873, Company G, Monongahela Artillery (Everett) was renamed the Light Guards and then redesignated as Company A, 10th Pennsylvania Infantry. It was disbanded on 16 July 1883 and reorganized as Company A, 10th Pennsylvania Infantry on 3 July 1884.
- In June 1875, the Logan Guards (Lewistown) were reorganized as Company G (Logan Guards), 5th Pennsylvania Infantry Regiment.
- In June 1880, Company A, 45th Pennsylvania Volunteers were reorganized as Company B, 5th Pennsylvania Infantry (Bellefonte Fencibles).
- On 11 May 1898, these units were mustered into federal service for the Spanish–American War. Company C, 5th Pennsylvania Infantry was redesignated Company C 5th Pennsylvania Volunteer Infantry. Sheridan Troop was redesignated Sheridan Troop, Pennsylvania Volunteer Cavalry. Company A, 5th Pennsylvania Infantry Regiment (Huntingdon) was organized, stood up and mustered into federal service for the war with Spain. The Lewistown, Tyrone, Everett, and Huntingdon units all served in Puerto Rico during the war. The Altoona and Bellefonte units served in Georgia and Kentucky during the war. They were mustered out of federal service between November 1898 and August 1899.
- In January 1910, the Logan Guards (Lewistown) were redesignated as Company M, 8th Pennsylvania Infantry Regiment and Company A, 5th Pennsylvania Infantry (Huntingdon) was redesignated as Company F, 8th Pennsylvania Infantry, Company C, 5th Infantry (Altoona) was redesignated as Company G, 10th Infantry, and Company B, 5th Infantry (Bellefonte) was redesignated Company L, 12th Pennsylvania Infantry. In May of the same year the Sheridan Troop was assigned to Squadron B which was redesignated as 2d Squadron in 1911. In 1914 the 2d Squadron was assigned to the 1st Pennsylvania Cavalry and Company L, 12th Pennsylvania Infantry was redesignated Troop L, 3rd Pennsylvania Cavalry.
- The units from Lewistown, Tyrone, Huntingdon, Everett, and Altoona were all mustered into federal service for duty on the Mexican border in July 1916.
- In July 1917, the Lewistown, Tyrone, Huntingdon, Everett, Altoona, and Bellefonte units were mustered into federal service for World War I. Collectively they were given credit for participating in Champagne-Marne, Ausne-Marne, Oise-Aisne, Meuse-Argonne, Ypres-Lys, Champagne 1918, and Lorraine 1918. They were all mustered out of federal service in May 1919.
- In October 1919, the battalion's units were Company M, 112th Infantry (Lewistown), 103rd Trench Mortar Battery, 103rd Engineer Battalion (Tyrone), Company F, 112th Infantry (Huntingdon), Company A, 10th Pennsylvania Infantry (Everett), Company G, 10th Pennsylvania Infantry (Altoona), and elements of the 108th and 109th Field Artillery (Bellefonte). However, these unit designations were short-lived. In 1920, the Tyrone unit was redesignated Troop B, 1st Pennsylvania Cavalry and the Bellefonte unit was redesignated Troop L, 1st Pennsylvania Cavalry. The year 1921 saw many changes in unit designation: Bellefonte was redesignated Troop B, 52nd Machine Gun Squadron, the Altoona unit was redesignated as Company G, 110th Infantry Regiment, The Everett unit was redesignated as Company A, 110th Infantry. The Huntingdon unit was redesignated Company F, 8th Pennsylvania Infantry. The Tyrone unit was redesignated Troop B, 104th Cavalry Regiment and the Lewistown unit was redesignated Troop C, 52nd Machine Gun Squadron.
- During 1921, Company D, 1st Pennsylvania Engineers was organized. This company was also in Altoona. This unit was redesignated less than a year later, in December 1921, when they became 103rd Ordnance Company, Special Troops. This new Altoona unit converted back to an engineer company unit they were redesignated Troop C, 104th Cavalry in 1929.

The Bellefonte unit was redesignated Troop L, 103d Cavalry. The Bellefonte unit was mustered into federal service in January 1941 as Battery B, 190th Field Artillery.

The Lewistown unit was redesignated as Machine Gun Troop, 104th Cavalry, 22nd Cavalry Division. This unit was redesignated as Service Battery, 166th Field Artillery, then Headquarters Battery, 3rd Battalion 166th Field Artillery, then Headquarters Battery, 2nd Battalion 166th Field Artillery and was mustered into federal service for World War II in February 1941.

The Tyrone unit was mustered into federal service for World War II as Troop B, 104th Mechanized Cavalry Reconnaissance Squadron.

The Huntingdon unit went through several redesignations including a quartermaster company and finally Headquarters and Headquarters Detachment of the 154th Transportation Truck Battalion.

Company A, 110th Infantry (Everett) and Company G, 110th Infantry (Altoona) unit were both mustered into federal service for World War II in February 1941. The other Altoona unit was mustered into federal service for home station duty during World War II as Battery B, 200th Field Artillery.

- Collectively, these units received credit for the following World War II campaigns: Normandy (with the Bellefonte unit participating in the assault landing), Northern France, Rhineland, Ardennes-Alsace, and Central Europe. All of these units were released from federal service in 1945.
- In 1947, the Lewistown unit was redesignated Headquarters and Service Battery, 176th Field Artillery Battalion. In August 1950 the Lewistown unit was mustered into federal service for the Korean War. It was released from active duty in 1953 and was redesignated Headquarters and Headquarters Company, 3rd Battalion 104th Cavalry.
- In 1949, the Bellefonte unit was redesignated Battery B, 688th Field Artillery.

=== Post-war (2nd Battalion) ===
- 1959 is when this organization began to resemble the current organizational structure. The Lewistown company was consolidated with another company and became Headquarters and Headquarter Troop, 3rd Reconnaissance Squadron, 104th Armored Cavalry Regiment. The Tyrone unit was reorganized and redesignated Troop M, 3rd Battalion of the 104th Armored Cavalry. The Huntingdon unit became Troop K, 3rd Battalion of the 104th Armored Cavalry and one of the Altoona companies became Howitzer Battery, 3rd Battalion 104th Cavalry. The Bellefonte unit was designated as Troop L, 3rd Reconnaissance Squadron of the 104th Armored Cavalry. The Everett unit remained with the 110th Infantry and the remaining Altoona unit became Company C in the 103rd Armor Regiment.
- In 1968, all of the units, except for the units in Huntingdon and Everett became the 2nd Battalion, 104th Cavalry; Lewistown was Headquarters and Headquarters Troop (less detached troops), Tyrone was Troop H, Altoona unit became Troop G and Howitzer Battery, and the Bellefonte unit became a Detachment of Headquarters and Headquarters Troop. The Huntingdon unit was the Howitzer Battery 1st Battalion of the 104th Armored Cavalry and the unit in Everett was a Detachment of Company B, 167th Quartermaster Battalion and then was converted to Company C, 1st Battalion 110th Infantry.
- In 1975, all except for the Everett unit were reorganized and redesignated as the 2nd Battalion 112th Infantry. Lewistown was Headquarters and Headquarters Company, Tyrone was Company B (less detached troops), Huntingdon was Company A. Troop G was converted to Company C, the Howitzer Battery was converted to the Combat Support Company, and the Bellefonte unit was redesignated as Detachment 1, Company B.
- In 1995 the battalion became a mechanized infantry battalion. The battalion became an M113 armored personnel carrier mounted battalion and was reorganized into its current configuration with the addition of the Everett unit. Headquarters and Headquarters Company remained in Lewistown, Company A in Huntingdon, Company B in Everett, Company C in Altoona, The Combat Support Company was redesignated Company D and remained in Altoona, and the Bellefonte unit became Company E (Anti-Armor).

=== Current ===
- In 2003 the battalion deployed 350 soldiers to Kosovo. The battalion, less some units, mobilized in February 2003, and conducted post-mobilization training at Fort Stewart, Georgia and Fort Polk, Louisiana. The battalion spent six months in Kosovo (rotation KFOR 5A) assigned to the Multi-National Brigade East performing peacekeeping missions. The battalion demobilized at Fort Dix, NJ in March 2004.
- In October 2003, the battalion re-organized as a Stryker Brigade Combat Team (SBCT) infantry battalion, with the Headquarters and Headquarters Company and Detachment 1, Company C in Lewistown; Company A (less detachment) in Huntingdon; Detachment 1, Company A in Everett; Companies B (less detachment) and C (less detachment) in Altoona; and Detachment 1, Company B in Tyrone. Company E in Bellefonte was reorganized as a separate company (D Company, 112th Infantry), an Anti-tank Company and a 56th SBCT asset, and was relocated to Hamburg in 2006. The transformation to an SBCT organization will be complete by 2008.
- In September, 2005, the battalion deployed to New Orleans, Louisiana to assist with hurricane Katrina relief efforts. The deployment lasted approximately 30 days and involved a wide spectrum of operations, including commodity distribution operations, area reconnaissance, security, and community assistance.
- In 2006, the battalion reorganized again with Headquarters and Headquarters Company in Lewistown, Company A (less detachment) in Huntingdon; Detachment 1, Company A in Everett; Company B in Altoona, and Company C (led detachment) in Bellefonte with Detachment 1, Company C in Tyrone.
- The battalion is assigned to the 56th Stryker Brigade Combat Team, 28th Infantry Division, Pennsylvania Army National Guard.
- The battalion was activated for federal service in Iraq 19 September 2008, and redeployed back to the States in late August 2009. Company C earned the Combat Infantry Streamer.
- In September 2015 the Battalion was activated and deployed to Philadelphia, PA serving as force protection for the Papal visit of Pope Francis.
- In June of 2020 the Battalion was activated, along with other elements of the 56th SBCT, and 28th ID, and deployed to Philadelphia to support state and local authorities during the civil unrest in the wake of the murder of George Floyd.
- In January 2024, 2-112th was Activated and Deployed to CLDJ and Somalia in support of TFHOA.

== Commanders ==
2nd Battalion

- 2021–present LTC Eric B. Ponzek
- 2019-2021 LTC Max W. Furman Jr.
- 2018-2019 LTC George W. Moebius
- 2015–2018 LTC Reece J. Lutz
- 2012–2015 LTC Matthew G. Cooper
- 2009–2012 LTC Eric E. Zimmerman
- 2006–2009 LTC Samuel E. Hayes III
- 2004–2006 LTC James F. Chisholm IV
- 2000–2004 LTC Louis Fazekas
- 1995–2000 LTC Philip R. Carlin
- 1991–1995 LTC Robert A. Stranko
- 1988–1991 LTC James D. Phillips
- 1984–1988 LTC Landry K. Appleby
- 1980–1984 LTC Don B. Hersey
- 1977–1980 LTC Hebert C.F. Werner
- 1971–1977 LTC Vernon E. James
- 1965–1971 LTC Milton K. Brandt
- 1959–1965 LTC Merril Goss

1st Battalion

- 2024-Present LTC Gerald Mothes
- 2020–2024 LTC Richard Yurocko
- 2015–2020 LTC Shawn Wray
- 2013–2015 LTC Robert Jorgensen Jr
- 2010–2013 LTC Gary Polsinelli
- 2007–2010 LTC Frank Flanagan
- 2004–2007 LTC Jerome Miller
- 2000–2004 BG Michael Madigan
- 1996–2000 COL Harry Coulter Jr
- 1991–1996 BG Merrell Yocum
- 1988–1991 COL Ronald Gilbert
- 1984–1988 BG Donald McIntosh
- 1980–1984 LTC Ray Kennel
- 1975–1980 COL Thomas Knobloch
- 1974–1975 LTC Archie Woodin
- 1970–1974 COL Frank Olsen
- 1969–1970 LTC Dale Prentice
- 1963–1969 BG Spencer Wurst

== Command Sergeants Major ==
- CSM Eric Steele
- CSM Jason Barclay
- CSM Evan Melendez
- CSM Travis Sterner
- CSM Joshua Porter
- SGM Charles Heuy
- SGM James Shumann
- CSM Raymond Henry
- CSM Richard Brinker
- CSM Cary Filipkowski
- CSM James Fonce
- CSM Thomas Hasson
- CSM Randall Pritts
- CSM Harry Buchanan III
- CSM Charles Deal
- CSM Jeremy Strathmeyer
- CSM Thomas Ridgway

== Campaign participation ==
=== 1st Battalion ===
Civil War silver bands:

Peninsula – Manassas – Antietam – Fredericksburg – Gettysburg – Wilderness – Spottsylvania – Virginia 1861–1863

Battle streamers:

Spanish–American War: Puerto Rico
World War I: Champagne – Champagne-Marne – Aisne-Marne – Oise-Marne – Lorraine – Meuse-Argonne
World War II: Normandy – Northern France – Ardennes-Alsace – Rhineland – Central Europe

Operation Iraqi Freedom

Unit decoration: Presidential Unit Citation, 16–23 Dec 1944 112th Infantry

=== 2nd Battalion ===
Civil War silver bands: Po Valley-Manassas-Antietam-Chancellorsville-Gettysburg-Atlanta-Fredericksburg-Vicksburg-Wilderness-Spotsylvania-Cold Harbor-Petersburg-Appomattox-Virginia 1861-South Carolina 1862-Mississippi 1863-Tennessee 1863

Battle streamers:

Spanish–American War: Puerto Rico
World War I: Champagne-Marne – Aisne-Marne – Oise-Aisne – Meuse-Argonne – Champagne 1918 – Lorraine 1918
World War II: Normandy – Northern France – Rhineland – Ardennes-Alsace – Central Europe
Kosovo
Operation Iraqi Freedom
