= George C. Rickards =

United States Army general

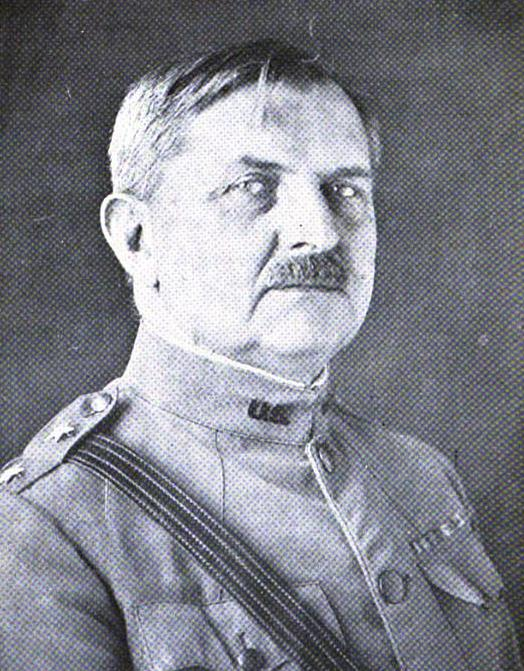
- General Rickards as National Guard Bureau Chief
- Born: August 25, 1860; Philadelphia, Pennsylvania, U.S.
- Died: January 15, 1933 (aged 72); Oil City, Pennsylvania, U.S.
- Burial place: Grove Hill Cemetery, Oil City, Pennsylvania
- Military career
- Allegiance: United States
- Branch: United States Army
- Service years: 1877–1925
- Rank: Major General
- Units: Pennsylvania Army National Guard; National Guard Bureau
- Commands: 112th Infantry Regiment; 56th Brigade; Chief of the National Guard Bureau
- Conflicts: Spanish–American War; Pancho Villa Expedition; World War I
- Awards: Distinguished Service Medal (U.S. Army)
- Other work: Venango County Register and Recorder.

George C. Rickards (August 25, 1860 – January 15, 1933) was a United States Army major general who served as Chief of the Militia Bureau, the first National Guard officer to hold this position.

== Early life ==
George Collins Rickards was born in Philadelphia, Pennsylvania on August 25, 1860. He was the son of Colonel William Rickards, who commanded the 29th Pennsylvania Infantry Regiment in the American Civil War. Rickards was raised and educated in Franklin, Pennsylvania. In 1877 he enlisted in the Pennsylvania National Guard, and in 1881 he settled in Oil City, Pennsylvania, where he became active in the hardware business. After obtaining his commission Rickards served primarily in the 16th Pennsylvania Infantry, including commander of Company F from 1883 to 1888, and Company D from 1888 to 1891. He was promoted to captain in 1883, major in 1891, and lieutenant colonel in 1892.

== Spanish–American War ==
The 16th Pennsylvania was mobilized for the Spanish–American War and served in Puerto Rico. Rickards served as a battalion commander, and was mustered out with the regiment in December, 1898.

== Pancho Villa Expedition ==
Rickards was promoted to colonel as commander of the 16th Pennsylvania in 1907. In 1916 he commanded the regiment in Texas during the Pancho Villa Expedition.

== World War I ==
The 16th Pennsylvania was federalized for World War I as the 112th Infantry Regiment, a unit of the 56th Brigade, 28th Infantry Division. He commanded the regiment throughout the war, and also acted as commander of the 56th Brigade on several occasions. He received the Distinguished Service Medal at the end of the war.

== Post World War I ==
Rickards was promoted to brigadier general in 1919, and commanded the 56th Brigade. He subsequently volunteered for active duty on the Army General Staff, and took part in development and passage of the National Defense Act of 1920, which included a provision that the Chief of the Militia Bureau be a National Guard officer. In 1921 Rickards was appointed Chief of the Militia Bureau, and he served until his 1925 retirement. During his term he worked to implement provisions of the 1920 National Defense Act, including reorganizing National Guard units to standardize them with units of the regular Army, building new armories and training sites, and taking steps to standardize training and education requirements between the National Guard and the regular Army.

== Post military career ==
After retiring from the National Guard Rickards ran unsuccessfully for Congress as a Republican in 1926.

From 1928 until his death Rickards served as Venango County Register and Recorder. He died in Oil City on January 15, 1933, and was buried at Oil City's Grove Hill Cemetery.

Military offices
Preceded by Jesse McI. Carter	Chief of the National Guard Bureau; 1921–1925	Succeeded by Creed C. Hammond
