= Vernon E. James =

US Army major general

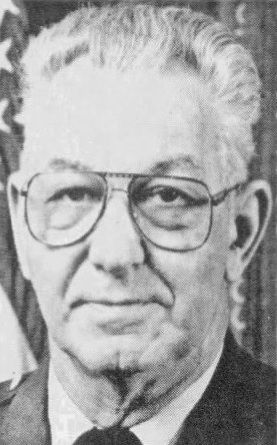
- James as commander of the 28th Infantry Division, c. 1985
- Born: November 15, 1929; Tyrone, Pennsylvania, US
- Died: April 22, 2010 (aged 80); Tyrone, Pennsylvania, US
- Burial place: Blair Memorial Park, Bellwood, Pennsylvania
- Alma mater: Cumberland University; United States Army Command and General Staff College; United States Army War College
- Spouse: Anna Belle Lucas (m. 1950–2010)
- Children: 3
- Military career
- Service: United States Army; Pennsylvania Army National Guard
- Service years: 1947–1989
- Rank: Major General (National Guard); Lieutenant General (Pennsylvania retired list)
- Units: U.S. Army Armor Branch; U.S. Army Infantry Branch
- Commands: Troop M, 3rd Squadron, 104th Armored Cavalry Regiment; 2nd Squadron, 104th Armored Cavalry Regiment; 2nd Battalion, 112th Infantry Regiment; 56th Infantry Brigade; 28th Infantry Division
- Awards: Army Distinguished Service Medal
- Other work: Employee Involvement Coordinator, Westvaco

Vernon E. James (15 November 1929 – 22 April 2010) was a career officer in the United States Army. A longtime member of the Pennsylvania Army National Guard, he served from 1946 to 1989 and attained the rank of major general. James commanded a cavalry troop and squadron, and an infantry battalion and brigade. His career culminated with command of the 28th Infantry Division from 1985 to 1989, and his awards included the Army Distinguished Service Medal.

A native of Tyrone, Pennsylvania, where he was raised and educated, James graduated from Tyrone High School in 1948. He began his civilian career with the Pennsylvania Railroad before becoming an employee of the Westvaco paper mill in Tyrone, where he held several technician and management positions before becoming the plant's employee involvement coordinator, the post he held at the time of his 1991 retirement. In 1989, James completed a bachelor's degree in social sciences at Tennessee's Cumberland University.

James had begun his military before his high school graduation by joining the Pennsylvania Army National Guard as a private in March 1947. As a member of Service Company, 104th Armored Cavalry Regiment, he was promoted to sergeant and served until November 1952, when he received a direct commission as a second lieutenant. James advanced through the ranks in command and staff assignments of increasing rank and responsibility, and his command assignments included: Troop M, 3rd Squadron, 104th Armored Cavalry Regiment; 2nd Squadron, 104th Armored Cavalry Regiment; 2nd Battalion, 112th Infantry Regiment; and 56th Infantry Brigade. In 1985, he was assigned to command the 28th Infantry Division, which he led until retiring in 1989.

In retirement, James continued to reside in Tyrone. He died in Tyrone on 22 April 2010. James was buried at Blair Memorial Park in Bellwood, Pennsylvania.

== Early life ==
Vernon Elwood James was born in Tyrone, Pennsylvania on 15 November 1929, the Boyd H. James and Edith (Swartz) James. He was raised and educated in Tyrone, and graduated from Tyrone High School in 1948. James worked for the Pennsylvania Railroad until 1952, when he joined Westvaco as an employee at the company's Tyrone paper plant. He eventually joined the company's management ranks, and at the time of his retirement from Westvaco in 1991, he was the Tyrone plant's employee involvement coordinator.

=== Family ===
In August 1950, James married to Anna Belle Lucas. They were the parents of three children, Deborah, Joy, and Stephen.

== Start of career ==
In March 1947, James joined Service Company, 104th Armored Cavalry Regiment as a private. He was promoted to private first class later in 1947. In February 1950, he was promoted to corporal. He was promoted to sergeant in December 1950.

In November 1952, James received a direct commission as a second lieutenant of Armor and was assigned to the 104th Armored Cavalry as the regimental maintenance officer. James advanced steadily through staff and command positions of increased rank and responsibility. His command assignments included: Troop M, 3rd Squadron, 104th Armored Cavalry Regiment beginning in March 1960; 2nd Squadron, 104th Armored Cavalry beginning in January 1971; 2nd Battalion, 112th Infantry Regiment beginning in April 1975; and the 56th Infantry Brigade beginning in June 1977.

=== Military education ===
- Associate Armor Officer Career Course (1962)
- United States Army Command and General Staff College (1974)
- Infantry Field Grade Officer Refresher Course (1974, 1975)
- Senior Reserve Component Officer Course, United States Army War College

== Continued career ==
In August 1980, James was appointed assistant division commander of the 28th Infantry Division and he received promotion to brigadier general. In May 1985, he assumed command of the 28th Infantry Division, with promotion to major general. In January 1989, James completed his Bachelor of Arts degree in social sciences at Cumberland University in Tennessee. He retired from the military on 30 November 1989.

In retirement, James continued to reside in Tyrone. He was a member of the Blair County Veterans Association, Association of the United States Army, Military Officers Association of America, 28th Division Heritage Association, National Guard Association of Pennsylvania, and U.S. Army Armor Association. James died in Tyrone on 22 April 2010. He was buried at Blair Memorial Park in Bellwood, Pennsylvania.

=== Awards ===
James's awards and decorations included the Army Distinguished Service Medal, Meritorious Service Medal with two oak leaf clusters, Pennsylvania Distinguished Service Medal, and Pennsylvania Meritorious Service Medal. He was a recipient of the Armor Association's Honorable Order of St. George. At his retirement, James was promoted to lieutenant general on Pennsylvania's retired list.

== Dates of rank ==
- Major General (retired), 30 November 1989
- Major General, 1 May 1985
- Brigadier General, 18 August 1980
- Colonel, August 1977
- Lieutenant Colonel, 2 May 1971
- Major, 23 March 1966
- Captain, 11 December 1961
- First Lieutenant, 24 November 1955
- Second Lieutenant, 25 November 1952
- Enlisted service, 1 March 1947 to 24 November 1952
