= Capella University =

American online university

Coordinates: 44°58′35″N 93°16′07″W

- Motto: Petere Sapientiam
- Motto in English: Ask for Wisdom
- Type: Private for-profit, online university
- Established: 1993; 33 years ago
- President: Constance St. Germain
- Students: 43,915 (fall 2023)
- Undergraduates: 16,177 (fall 2023)
- Postgraduates: 27,738 (fall 2023)
- Location: Capella Tower, Minneapolis, Minnesota, United States
- Campus: Online
- Colors: Red and black
- Website: www.capella.edu

Capella University is a private for-profit, online university headquartered in Minneapolis, Minnesota. It is owned by the publicly traded Strategic Education, Inc. and accredited by the Higher Learning Commission. Nearly 44,000 students were enrolled in 2023.

== History ==
Capella University was established as The Graduate School of America by Dr. Harold Abel and Stephen Shank in 1993. Shank was the former CEO of Tonka. Abel, formerly the president of Castleton State College, Central Michigan University, and Walden University, became the first president of the institution.

In 1997, Capella University received regional accreditation. Two years later the parent company and university were renamed Capella Education Company and Capella University, respectively. In 2000, Capella began to offer bachelor's degree programs.

In 2005, Capella Education Company announced its intention to go public with an initial public offering. In 2006, they became a publicly traded company (NASDAQ: CPLA), raising $80 million with the offering.

In 2007, Capella was named one of 86 higher education institutions in the United States to have received the National Centers of Academic Excellence in Information Assurance Education (CAE/IAE) designation by the National Security Agency (NSA). The designation was valid for the academic years 2007 through 2012.

In March 2008, Capella Education Company, longtime occupant of the 225 South Sixth skyscraper in downtown Minneapolis, signed a new lease that expanded its office and renamed the building Capella Tower. The building houses all of the company's 1,150 downtown Minneapolis administrative staff.

In 2009, The Project Management Institute (PMI) Global Accreditation Center for Project Management (GAC) accredited two Capella University online degree programs: the MS in Information Technology with a specialization in Project Management; and the BS in Information Technology with a specialization in Project Management. It also launched its School of Public Service Leadership.

In 2010, Capella, along with three other schools, was awarded the CHEA Award for Outstanding Institutional Practice in Student Learning Outcomes by The Council for Higher Education Accreditation.

In August 2018, Capella University's parent company Capella Education merged with Strayer Education Inc. to form Strategic Education, Inc.

In 2019, Capella added learning sites in Atlanta, Georgia and Orlando, Florida.

Capella began a partnership with Optum in August 2023 to launch an educational program for nursing. In September 2023, Constance St. Germain was appointed president of the university.

== Academics ==
Academic rankings

National
- Washington Monthly: 441 of 1421

According to College Navigator, Capella's faculty comprised 207 full-time instructors and 1,321 part-time instructors in 2018.

Undergraduate applicants who do not have any credits eligible for transfer must complete a university-approved examination to be considered for admission.

Capella's enrollment is composed mainly of graduate students, including 45 percent MS/MBA students and 18 percent PhD/PsyD doctoral students. The undergraduate population of Capella makes up 35 percent of the student body. Less than one percent are working on certificate programs. The average age of a Capella student is 37. Ninety-five percent of students are enrolled part-time, 86 percent are female, and 53 percent are ethnic minorities.

Capella allows a limited number of credits to be earned through a prior learning assessment program which can provide college credit for past experiences.

=== Accreditation ===
Capella University is accredited by the Higher Learning Commission. Baccalaureate and graduate level teacher education programs are accredited by the National Council for Accreditation of Teacher Education. The graduate level counseling program is accredited by The Council for Accreditation of Counseling and Related Educational Programs (CACREP). Baccalaureate and graduate level nursing programs are accredited by the Commission on Collegiate Nursing Education. Baccalaureate and graduate level business programs have been accredited by the Accreditation Council for Business Schools and Programs since 2014. Baccalaureate level information technology programs have been accredited by the Accreditation Board for Engineering and Technology, Inc (ABET). In 2024, the American Psychological Association (APA) accredited Capella's online MS Clinical Psychology program.

== Controversies ==
=== U.S. Department of Education compliance audit ===
In 2006, the United States Department of Education, Office of the Inspector General (OIG) began a compliance audit of Capella. OIG focused on the university's policies and procedures concerning the return of Title IV funds as required by Federal Law for students who failed to give official notice that they were withdrawing from the school. The OIG found that Capella made accounting mistakes in how it calculated student eligibility for government-subsidized loans, including failing to return all funds disbursed on behalf of students who dropped out before their first day of class. Capella, in a response to the audit, says it recognizes some past shortcomings in its accounting practices and has made changes to ensure that such errors are not repeated.

=== Criticism of marketing expenses and executive compensation ===
In 2012, Capella received criticism for its expenditures on marketing, profit, and CEO pay rather than instruction, and its use of aggressive recruiting practices. According to a report issued by former U.S. Senator Tom Harkin for the Senate Education Committee, approximately 79% of the institution's cash flow comes from US government Title IV payments, including Pell grants. The report concluded that Capella's recruiting and student services were better managed than most other for-profit competitors, especially among graduate degree students. The high withdrawal rate among Bachelor's student hopefuls, the over-reliance on part-time instructors, and the high relative marketing budget were cited as potential causes for concern.

=== Class-action lawsuit ===
In 2018, a lawsuit was filed against Capella in the U.S. District Court for the District of Minnesota alleging that the school "violated doctoral students' rights by creating a process intended to ensure that it would be difficult, if not impossible, for students to timely complete, or complete at all, their doctoral programs." The school rejected the lawsuit's claims, stating that the court had thrown out the majority of the legal claims. In 2022, the class action was resolved through private mediation with terms not disclosed.

=== Alleged fraud regarding student loans ===
Capella University was one of 153 institutions in student loan cancellation due to alleged fraud. The class action was brought by a group of more than 200,000 student borrowers, assisted by the Project on Predatory Student Lending, part of the Legal Services Center of Harvard Law School. A settlement was approved in August 2022, stating that the schools on the list included "substantial misconduct by the listed schools, whether credibly alleged or in some instances proven." In April 2023, the Supreme Court rejected a challenge to the settlement and allowed to proceed $6 billion in debt cancellation due to alleged fraud.

== Notable alumni ==
- Jerry G. Beck Jr., PhD, US Army brigadier general
- Rafael C. Castillo, PhD, first editor of ViAztlan: A Journal of Chicano Arts and Letters
- Tammy Duckworth, PhD, United States Senator from Illinois
- Rocky Dwyer, PhD, professor
- Christopher Erhardt, PhD, video game designer and professor
- Daniel Farcas, Chilean deputy
- Debretsion Gebremichael, PhD, president of Tigray Region from 2018 to 2023
- Josh Haeder, BS, 33rd treasurer of South Dakota
- David W. May, PhD, adjutant general of the Wisconsin National Guard
- Irene Muloni, MBA, Minister for Energy and Minerals of Uganda
- Arthur Seale, PhD, convicted kidnapper and murderer
- Linda L. Singh, PhD, adjutant general of the Maryland National Guard
- Brandt Smith, PhD, member of the Arkansas House of Representatives from Jonesboro, Arkansas
- Jennifer Welter, PhD, football player and the first woman to coach in a men's professional football league
- Xavier Woods, PhD, professional wrestler
