= John A. Wiley =

United States Army general

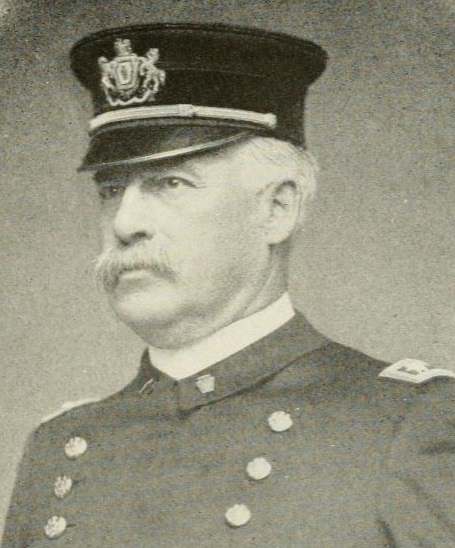
- Born: September 3, 1843; Pittsburgh, Pennsylvania
- Died: December 28, 1909 (aged 66); Franklin, Pennsylvania
- Military career
- Allegiance: United States
- Branch: Union Army; Pennsylvania Army National Guard
- Service years: 1861–1865; 1871–1909
- Rank: Major general
- Commands: Oil City Grays; 16th Pennsylvania Infantry Regiment; 2nd Brigade, Pennsylvania National Guard Division; 2nd Division, First Corps; Pennsylvania National Guard Division
- Conflicts: American Civil War; Spanish–American War
- Other work: Business executive

John A. Wiley (September 3, 1843 – December 28, 1909) was a Pennsylvania business executive, Civil War veteran, and National Guard officer who attained the rank of major general as commander of the organization now known as the 28th Infantry Division.

== Biography ==
John Alexander Wiley was born in Pittsburgh, Pennsylvania on September 3, 1843. He was educated in Pittsburgh, and in 1861 joined the Union Army for the American Civil War, enlisting as a private in Company C, 8th Pennsylvania Reserve Regiment. This organization was mustered into federal service as the 37th Pennsylvania Volunteer Infantry Regiment, and Wiley attained the rank of corporal while taking part in numerous battles, including Antietam, before receiving his discharge in 1864.

After his discharge, Wiley was assigned to Camp Reynolds, near Pittsburgh, where he served as chief quartermaster clerk until the end of the war in 1865.

After the war, Wiley moved to Venango County to begin a career in the oil industry, and he was employed at different times as a pipeline manager and operator of refineries and other oil-related facilities.

Wiley returned to military service in 1871, when he enlisted as a private in the Oil City Grays, a Venango County unit of the Pennsylvania National Guard. He soon received promotion to First Sergeant, and in 1873 he received his commission as a captain and became commander of the Oil City Grays. He became regimental commander of the Venango Grays as a colonel in 1876, and this organization was subsequently designated the 16th Pennsylvania Infantry Regiment.

In 1886 Wiley was promoted to brigadier general and assigned to command the Pennsylvania National Guard's 2nd Brigade.

Wiley was active in local politics and government, and served as Mayor of Franklin in 1894 and 1895. He also served as principal of the high school in Franklin and as Franklin's school superintendent.

In 1898 Wiley volunteered for the Spanish–American War, and he commanded 2nd Division, First Corps.

Wiley was promoted to major general in 1907 and assigned as commander of the Pennsylvania Division, the organization now known as the 28th Infantry Division. He served until retiring from the military in 1909. He was succeeded by Wendell P. Bowman.

He died in Franklin on December 28, 1909, and was buried at Franklin Cemetery.
