= 56th Mobile Brigade Combat Team =

- 28th Infantry Division SSI, worn by the 56th MBCT
- Active: 1 May 1800–24 August 1864; 17 September 1867–30 September 1868; 7 April 1870–22 October 1898; 1 February 1899–18 October 1916; 28 March 1917–24 May 1919; 2 August 1920–22 November 1945; 27 February 1947–present
- Country: United States
- Branch: United States Army
- Type: Infantry Brigade
- Role: Infantry
- Size: 4,000
- Part of: 28th Infantry Division
- Garrison/HQ: Biddle Air National Guard Base; Willow Grove, Pennsylvania
- Nickname: "Independence Brigade"
- Motto: "Strength Through Honor" "Ride the Lightning"
- Engagements: American Civil War; Peninsula; Antietam; Fredericksburg; Chancellorsville; Gettysburg; Wilderness; Spotsylvania; Cold Harbor; Petersburg; Virginia 1865; World War I; Champagne-Marne; Aisne-Marne; Oise-Aisne; Meuse-Argonne; Champagne 1918; Lorraine 1918; World War II; Central Pacific; Eastern Mandates; Western Pacific; Operation Iraqi Freedom

Commanders
- Notable commanders: George C. Rickards; Vernon E. James

Insignia
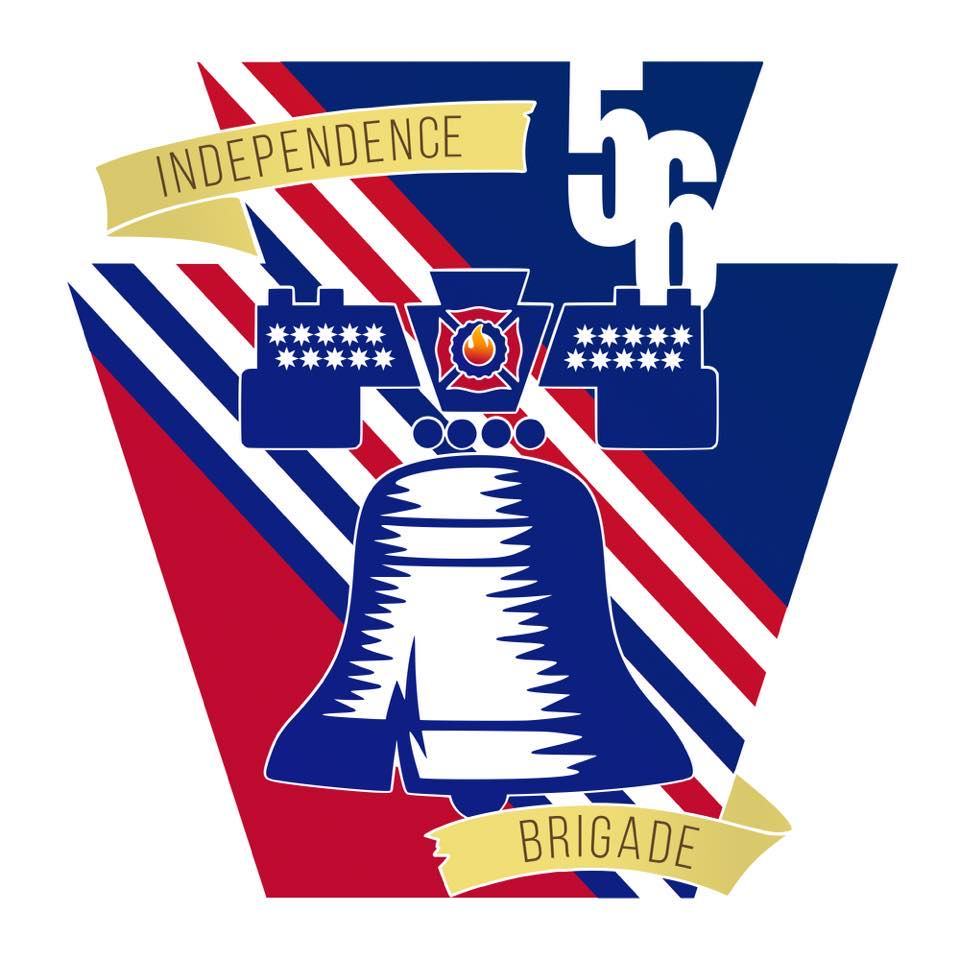
- Team insignia

The 56th Mobile Brigade Combat Team (MBCT), also known as the Independence Brigade, is a brigade combat team of the Pennsylvania Army National Guard and has its headquarters located at Horsham Air Guard Station in Willow Grove, Pennsylvania. The brigade is one of five brigades of the 28th Infantry Division.

Until 31 March 2026, the brigade was one of nine Stryker Brigade Combat Teams in the United States Army and for many years, until the conversion of 81st SBCT, it was the only reserve component Stryker unit in the Army. Since 31 March 2026, the brigade is a mobile brigade combat team and equipped with the M1301 infantry squad vehicle. The brigade provides light infantry land assets for both federal and state active duty missions. The federal mission is to deploy on short notice as part of the 28th Infantry Division and destroy, capture, or repel enemy forces using maneuver and shock effect. The state mission of the brigade is to serve the Governor and the citizens of the Commonwealth as needed in times of natural disaster or civil unrest.

== History ==
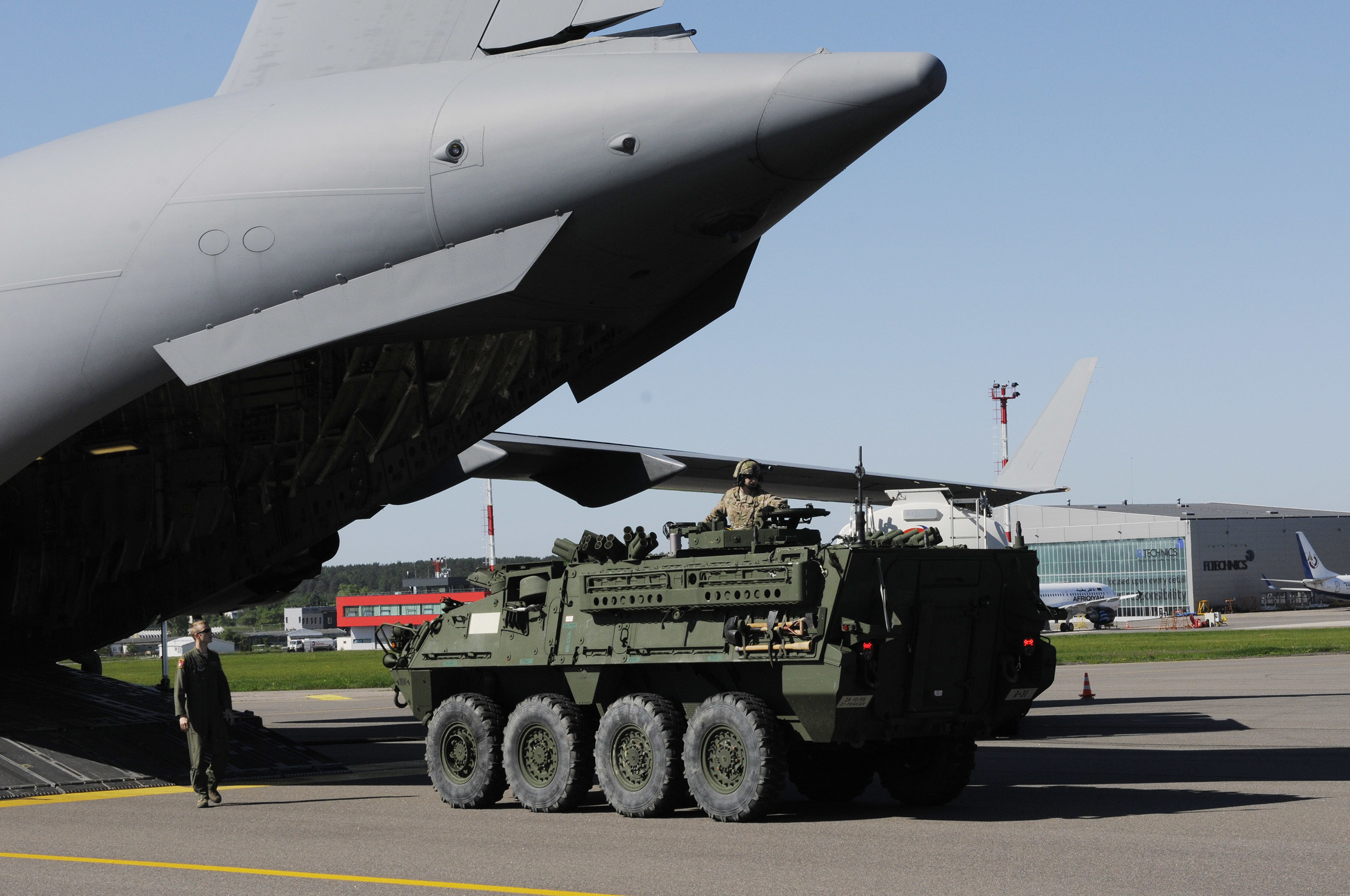
Strykers from the 56th SBCT arrive in Lithuania 6 June 2015 to take part in Saber Strike 2015.

The 56th SBCT is composed of some of the oldest units in the United States Army. The Centre for Military History recognizes the Weccacoe Fire Company as the heraldic antecedent unit, formed in May 1800. The current brigade derives its numerical designation, although not its lineage, from the 56th Infantry Brigade. The 56th Infantry Brigade was formed in September 1917 as part of the 28th Division. The brigade, commanded in late 1918 by Arthur L. Conger, initially included the 111th and 112th Infantry Regiments. During World War I it was involved in the Meuse-Argonne, Champagne-Marne, Aisne-Marne, Oise-Aisne, and Ypres-Lys (field artillery only) operations. During the war, the 28th Infantry Division took a total of 14,139 casualties (KIA-2,165; WIA-11,974). The brigade was again part of the 28th Division from 1921 to 1941.

The current brigade traces its origins to the Pentomic and Reorganization Objective Army Division reorganizations of the 28th Infantry Division from regiments to battle groups and finally to brigades, culminating in 1963. In 1963, the brigade was formed as the 1st Brigade, 28th Infantry Division. In 1968, as part of the McNamara-inspired reorganization of the Army National Guard, it was reassigned to the 42nd Infantry Division as the 56th Brigade, 42nd Infantry Division. From 1975 it has again been assigned to the 28th Infantry Division.

The brigade was called to active duty during the Blizzard of 1996, when flood emergencies were declared by the Governors of Pennsylvania and West Virginia. During the blizzard in Philadelphia, the 56th Brigade won credit in saving over 70 lives by providing emergency medical transportation during the duration of the Governor's proclamation.

In December 2000, the United States Army proposed a new reorganization. The following year, the 56th Brigade was selected as the only reserve component Stryker Brigade out of seven in the entire United States Army. The brigade was reflagged the 56th Stryker Brigade Combat Team on 24 October 2004 at Fort Indiantown Gap's Muir Field.

On 1 September 2005 the entire Brigade Combat Team was mobilized to deploy to Louisiana after Hurricane Katrina, the sixth strongest hurricane ever recorded in the Atlantic Ocean, slammed into the Gulf Coast. The 56th SBCT was stationed in and around New Orleans to support the relief effort for nearly a month and a half. This included a subsequent deployment to the areas damaged by Hurricane Rita, which made land fall near the Louisiana-Texas border.

== Iraq deployment ==
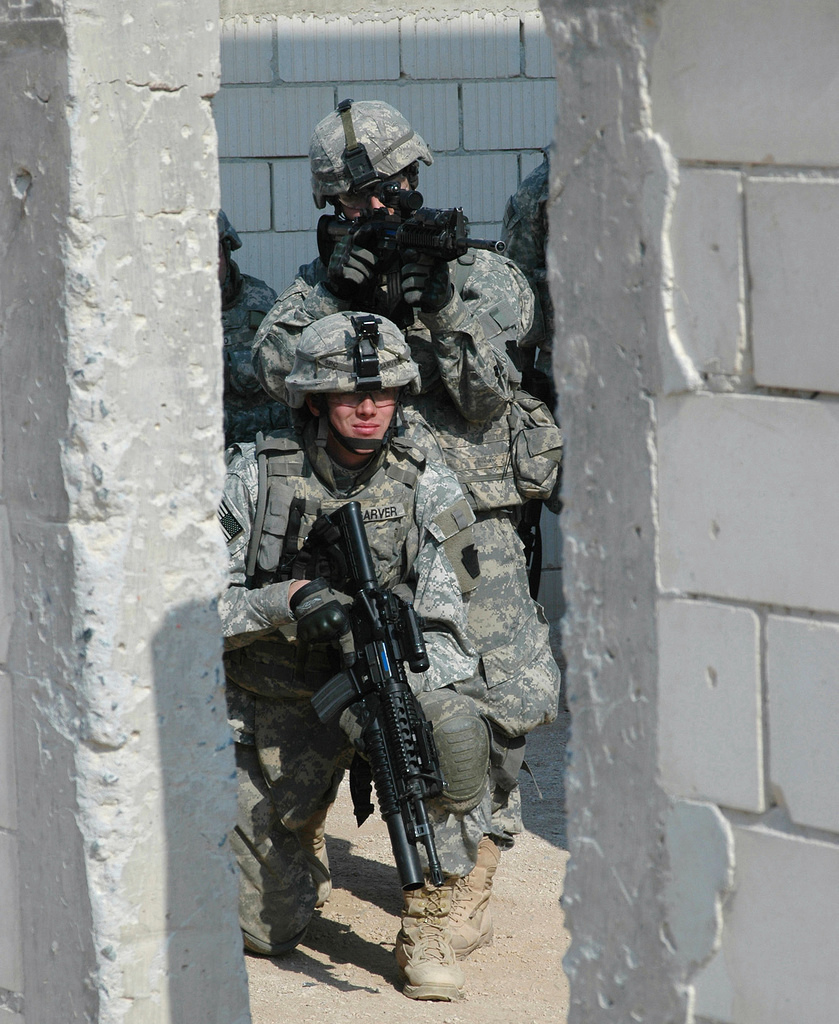
56th Stryker Brigade soldiers in training before going to Iraq.

Under the command of Colonel Marc Ferraro, the brigade trained at Camp Shelby, Mississippi from 19 September 2008 until November 2008 when it moved to the Joint Readiness Training Center (JRTC) in Fort Polk, Louisiana until December 2008. The brigade continued training at Joint Base McGuire-Dix-Lakehurst in December 2008 and moved to Camp Buehring, Kuwait, in January 2009 awaiting movement into Iraq. The 56th SBCT, based at Camp Taji, Iraq, conducted operations in the northern Baghdad Governorate, as part of Multi-National Division – Baghdad, from January to September 2009, before redeploying to Kuwait and returning home at Joint Base McGuire-Dix-Lakehurst.

56th Stryker Brigade – OIF composition

- Headquarters and Headquarters Company (HHC) (Stryker)
  - 1st Battalion, 111th Infantry Regiment
  - 1st Battalion, 112th Infantry Regiment
  - 2nd Battalion, 112th Infantry Regiment
  - 1st Battalion, 108th Field Artillery Regiment (FAR)
  - Battery B, 1st Battalion, 109th FAR
  - 328th Brigade Support Battalion (BSB)
  - 2nd Squadron, 104th Cavalry Regiment–Reconnaissance Surveillance and Target Acquisition (RSTA)
  - 856th Engineer Company
  - 656th Signal Company
  - 556th Military Intelligence Company (MIC)
  - Company D (Anti Tank), 112th Infantry Regiment

== Organization 2026 ==
- 56th Mobile Brigade Combat Team, at Horsham Air Guard Station
  - Headquarters and Headquarters Company, 56th Mobile Brigade Combat Team, at Horsham Air Guard Station
  - 1st Battalion, 111th Infantry Regiment, in Plymouth Meeting
    - Headquarters and Headquarters Company, 1st Battalion, 111th Infantry Regiment, in Plymouth Meeting
    - Company A, 1st Battalion, 111th Infantry Regiment, in Philadelphia
    - Company B, 1st Battalion, 111th Infantry Regiment, in Coatesville
    - Company C, 1st Battalion, 111th Infantry Regiment, in Kutztown
    - Company D (Multi-purpose Company), 1st Battalion, 111th Infantry Regiment
  - 1st Battalion, 112th Infantry Regiment, in Cambridge Springs
    - Headquarters and Headquarters Company, 1st Battalion, 112th Infantry Regiment, in Cambridge Springs
    - Company A, 1st Battalion, 112th Infantry Regiment, in Butler
    - Company B, 1st Battalion, 112th Infantry Regiment, in Cambridge Springs
    - Company C, 1st Battalion, 112th Infantry Regiment, in Lewis Run
      - Detachment 1, Company C, 1st Battalion, 112th Infantry Regiment, in Butler
    - Company D (Multi-purpose Company), 1st Battalion, 112th Infantry Regiment
  - 2nd Battalion, 112th Infantry Regiment, in Lewistown
    - Headquarters and Headquarters Company, 2nd Battalion, 112th Infantry Regiment, in Lewistown
    - Company A, 2nd Battalion, 112th Infantry Regiment, in Huntingdon
    - Company B, 2nd Battalion, 112th Infantry Regiment, in Duncansville
    - Company C, 2nd Battalion, 112th Infantry Regiment, in Lewisburg
    - Company D (Multi-purpose Company), 2nd Battalion, 112th Infantry Regiment
  - M Company, 56th Stryker Brigade Combat Team (Multi-Functional Reconnaissance Company)
    - Detachment 1, Company M, 56th Mobile Brigade Combat Team, at Muir Army Heliport (RQ-28A UAV)
  - 856th Combat Engineer Company — Infantry, in Punxsutawney
  - 656th Signal Company, in Torrance
    - Detachment 1, 656th Signal Company, in Philadelphia
  - 556th Military Intelligence Company, at Horsham Air Guard Station

=== Aligned units ===
28th Infantry Division units aligned with the 56th Mobile Brigade Combat Team:

- 28th Division Artillery
  - 1st Battalion, 108th Field Artillery Regiment, in Carlisle
    - Headquarters and Headquarters Battery, 1st Battalion, 108th Field Artillery Regiment, in Carlisle
    - Battery A, 1st Battalion, 108th Field Artillery Regiment, in Plymouth
    - Battery B, 1st Battalion, 108th Field Artillery Regiment, in Fayetteville
    - Battery C, 1st Battalion, 108th Field Artillery Regiment, in Philadelphia
    - Service Battery, 1st Battalion, 108th Field Artillery Regiment, in Gettysburg
- 28th Division Sustainment Brigade
  - 328th Light Support Battalion, in Elizabethtown
    - Headquarters and Distribution Company, 328th Light Support Battalion, in Elizabethtown
    - Company A (Maintenance and Supply), 328th Light Support Battalion, in Elizabethtown
    - Company B (Medical), 328th Light Support Battalion, in Elizabethtown
    - Company C (Combat Logistic), 328th Light Support Battalion, in Plymouth Meeting — aligned with the 1st Battalion, 111th Infantry Regiment
    - Company D (Combat Logistic), 328th Light Support Battalion, in Cambridge Springs — aligned with the 1st Battalion, 112th Infantry Regiment
    - Company E (Combat Logistic), 328th Light Support Battalion, in State College — aligned with the 2nd Battalion, 112th Infantry Regiment

== Lineage ==
- Organized 1800-05-01 at Philadelphia as the Weccacoe Fire Company of the Philadelphia City Volunteer Fire Department.
- Reorganized as Company B, 72nd Pennsylvania Volunteer Infantry Regiment (Fire Zouave Regiment), and mustered into federal service 1861-08-10 at Philadelphia;
- Mustered out 1864-08-24 at Philadelphia.
- Reorganized 1867-09-17 in the Pennsylvania Militia at Philadelphia as Company A, Weccacoe Legion.
- Re-designated 1868-03-06 as Company A, Keystone Guards.
- Disbanded 1868-09-30 at Philadelphia (Weccacoe Fire Company remained in service as a separate organization).
- Pennsylvania Militia re-designated 1870-04-07 as the Pennsylvania National Guard.
- Weccacoe Legion reorganized 1870-04-29 in the Pennsylvania National Guard at Philadelphia as a company.
- Expanded 1878-10-22 – 1878-10-26 as a battalion.
- Former Company A, Keystone Guards, reorganized 1878-10-30 as Company A, Weccacoe Legion.
- Re-designated 1879-07-31 as Company E, 3rd Infantry Regiment.
- Re-designated 1880-10-31 as Company A, 3rd Infantry Regiment.
- Mustered into federal service 1898-05-11 at Mount Gretna, as Company A, 3rd Pennsylvania Volunteer Infantry;
- Mustered out 1898-10-22 at Philadelphia.
- Reorganized 1899-02-01 at Philadelphia as Company A, 3rd Infantry Regiment.
- Mustered into federal service 1916-07-01 at Philadelphia;
- Mustered out 1916-10-18.
- Mustered into federal service 1917-03-28 at Philadelphia;
- Drafted into federal service 1917-08-05.
- Consolidated 1917-10-11 with Company A, 10th Infantry Regiment (organized in 1869), and consolidated unit reorganized and re-designated as Company A, 110th Infantry, an element of the 28th Division.
- Demobilized 1919-05-24 at Camp Dix, New Jersey.
- Former Company A, 3rd Infantry Regiment, reorganized 1920-08-02 in the Pennsylvania National Guard at Philadelphia as Company A, 3rd Infantry;
- Federally recognized 1920-08-07.
- Reorganized and re-designated 1921-04-01 as the Howitzer Company, 111th Infantry, an element of the 28th Division.
- Consolidated 1939-10-01 with Headquarters Company, 111th Infantry (see Headquarters Company, 6th Infantry Below), and consolidated unit designated as Headquarters Company, 111th Infantry.
- Inducted into federal service 1941-02-17 at Philadelphia.
- 111th Infantry relieved 1942-02-17 from assignment to the 28th Division.
- Inactivated 1945-11-22 at Camp Anza, California.
- Reorganized and federally recognized 1947-02-27 at Philadelphia.
- Consolidated 1959-06-01 with the Medical Company, 111th Infantry (see Medical Company, 111th Infantry Below), and consolidated unit reorganized and re-designated as Headquarters Company, 1st Battle Group, 111th Infantry, an element of the 28th Infantry Division.
- Reorganized and re-designated 1963-04-01 as HHC, 1st Brigade, 28th Infantry Division.
- Re-designated 1968-02-17 as HHC, 56th Brigade, 42d Infantry Division.
- Re-designated 1975-04-01 as HHC, 56th Brigade, 28th Infantry Division.
- Re-designated 2004-10-04 as HHC, 56th Stryker Brigade Combat Team, 28th Infantry Division.

== Honors ==
=== Unit decorations ===
Ribbon	Award	Year	Notes
	Meritorious Unit Commendation	2009	for service in Operation Iraqi Freedom

=== Campaign streamers ===
- American Civil War.
1. Peninsula
2. Antietam
3. Fredericksburg
4. Chancellorsville
5. Gettysburg
6. Wilderness
7. Spotsylvania
8. Cold Harbor
9. Petersburg
10. Virginia 1863
- World War I
1. Meuse-Argonne
2. Champagne-Marne
3. Aisne-Marne
4. Oise-Aisne
5. Ypres-Lys
- World War II
1. Central Pacific
2. Eastern Mandates
3. Western Pacific
- Operation Iraqi Freedom
1. Iraq
