= 111th Infantry Regiment (United States) =

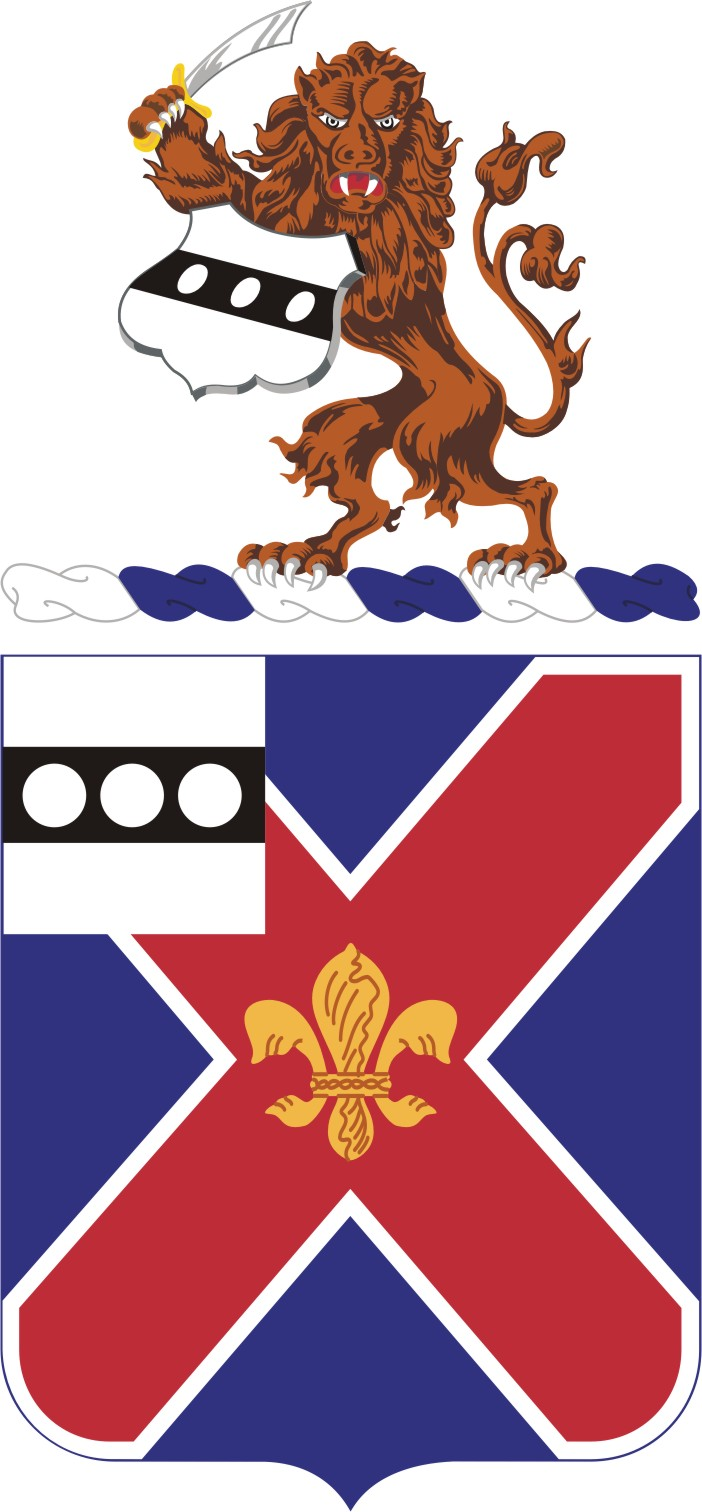
- Coat of arms
- Active: 1747
- Allegiance: Commonwealth of Pennsylvania
- Branch: Army National Guard
- Type: Infantry
- Role: Stryker
- Garrison/HQ: 1st Battalion - Plymouth Meeting, Pennsylvania, U.S.
- Nickname: The Associators (Special Designation)
- Motto: "Nulla Vestigia Retrorsum" (No Step Backward)
- Engagements: Revolutionary War; War of 1812; American Civil War; Spanish–American War; World War I; World War II; Operation Noble Eagle(Kosovo Force); Operation Iraqi Freedom

Commanders
- Current commander: LTC Michael P. Tier
- Notable commanders: John Cadwalder; Edward C. Shannon

Insignia
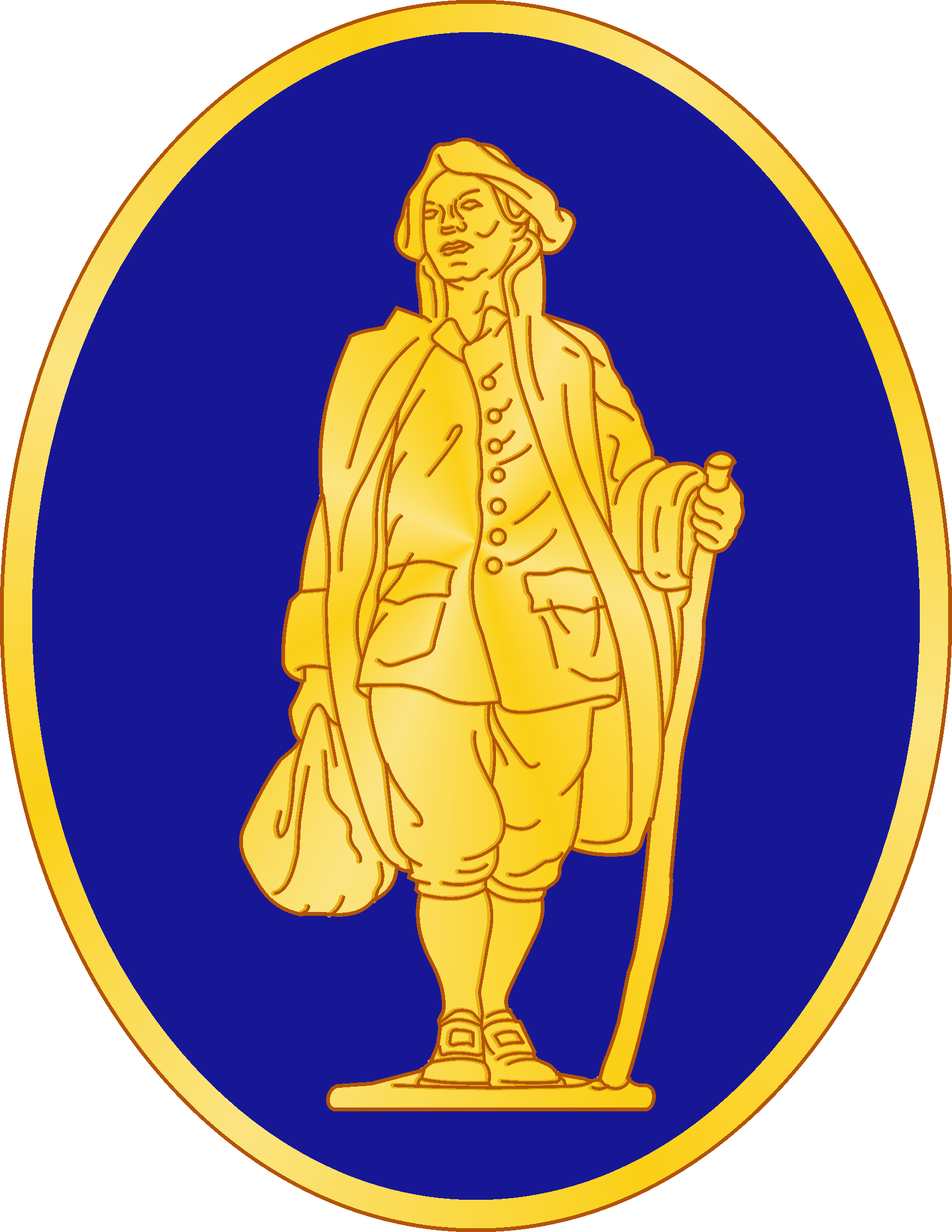
- Distinctive unit insignia

The 111th Infantry Regiment, originally the Pennsylvania Militia or "Associators", were a Pennsylvania militia unit that fought in the American Revolution, composed of civilian males from the citizenry of Pennsylvania. It is one of several National Guard units with colonial roots and campaign credit for the War of 1812. The Pennsylvania Militia often fought in conjunction with General Washington and the Continental Army along the Delaware River.

The Pennsylvania Militia is currently represented in the U.S. Army by 1st Battalion, 111th Infantry assigned to the Pennsylvania Army National Guard's 56th Stryker Brigade Combat Team, 28th Infantry Division. The regiment, founded as the Associators by Benjamin Franklin in Philadelphia, Pennsylvania on 21 November 1747, is the oldest regiment in Pennsylvania.

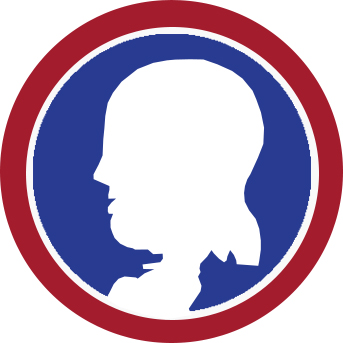
111th Regimental Combat Team SSI 1947-1959

In February 1942, the 111th Regiment was detached from the 28th Infantry Division and re-formed as a regimental combat team in the Army Ground Forces Reserve, attached to the Eastern Defense Command at Camp Pendleton, Virginia to guard militarily important facilities in the Chesapeake Bay area. From this assignment, it was transferred to the Pacific Theater in late 1943. Throughout the rest of the war, the companies of the 111th would be used as replacement or additional units in combat conditions. The Third Battalion of the 111th was used for mopping up operations on Makin Atoll in the Gilbert Islands in December 1943.

The 111th B Company was assigned to the Seventh Cavalry Reconnaissance Troop of the Seventh Division for the assault on Kwajalein Island in February 1944. In other actions, I Company of the 111th was involved in assaulting and capturing Ujeland Atoll in the Marshall Islands in April 1944. And in September 1944, both the D and H Companies were assigned to the 81st Division for an attack on Peleliu and Auguar Islands in the Palaus chain. Later, in February 1945, the entire 111th returned to Peleliu Island for mopping-up operations. When the war ended in September 1945, the 111th had added three battle streamers, Central Pacific, Eastern Mandate and Western Pacific, for a total of 38 on its flag.

The 1st Battalion, 111th Infantry Regiment was awarded the Meritorious Unit Commendation - Operation Iraqi Freedom.

== Lineage ==
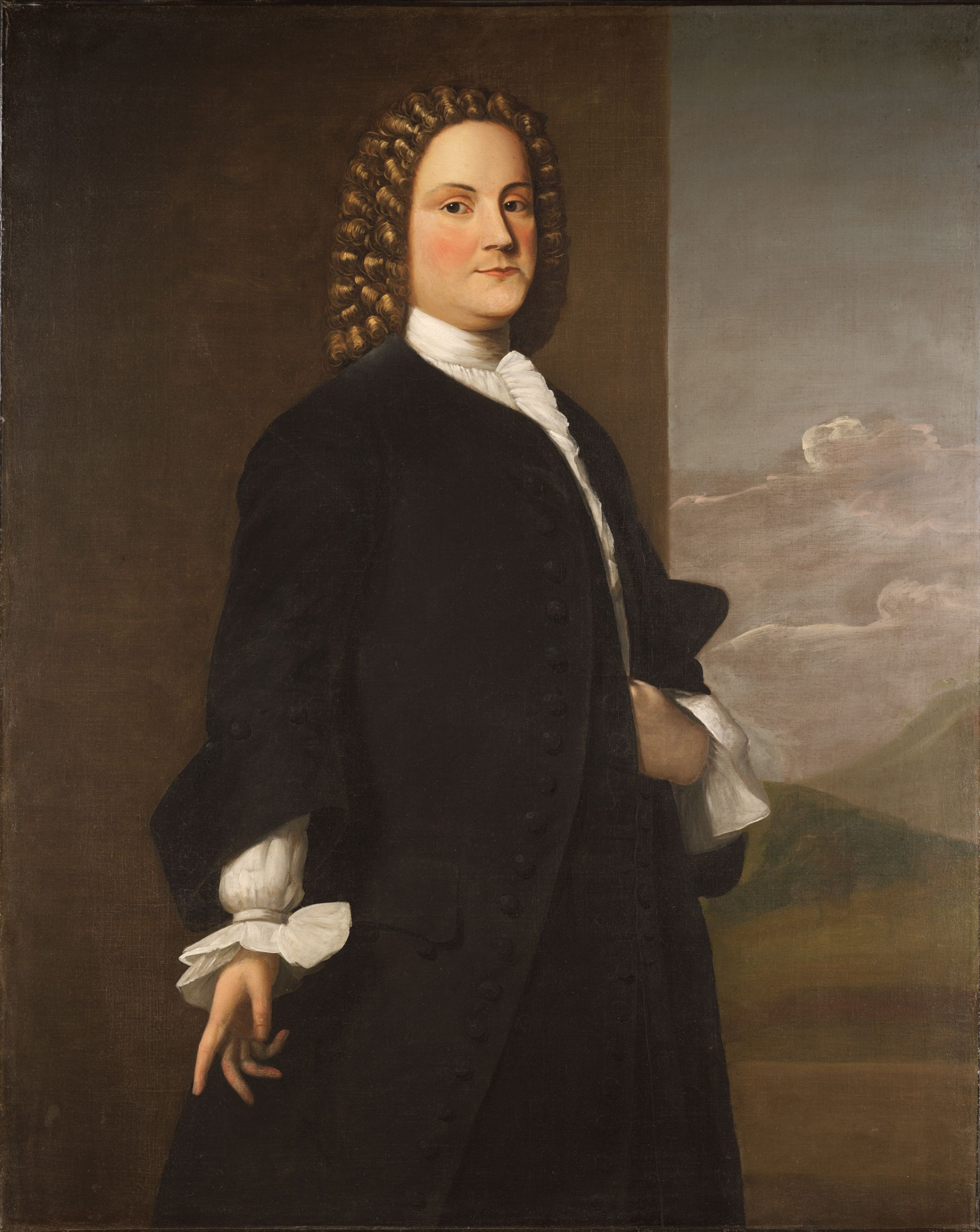
Benjamin Franklin

- 1747 Constituted 7 December 1747 by official recognition of the Associators, founded 21 November 1747 in Philadelphia by Benjamin Franklin
- 1747 Organized 29 December 1747 as Associated Regiment of Foot of Philadelphia
- 1775 Reorganized as Associates of the City and Liberties of Philadelphia, with five Battalions
- 1777 Reorganized as the Philadelphia Brigade of Militia, commanded by Brigadier General John Cadwalader
- 1793 Reorganized 11 April 1793 as Volunteer Infantry Elements of 1st Brigade, 1st Division Pennsylvania Militia
- 1814 Volunteer Infantry Companies of 1st Brigade reorganized as 1st Regiment, Pennsylvania Volunteer Infantry, commanded by Colonel Clement C. Biddle; entered federal service 24 August 1814 and relieved 4 January 1815
- 1816 Reorganized 19 March 1816 as Volunteer Infantry Elements of 1st Division
- 1846 Federal service 15 December 1846 to 27 July 1847 in War with Mexico
- 1858 Reorganized as 1st Infantry Regiment, 1st Division
- 1861 Regiment consisted of the following companies: State Fencibles Infantry Corps; Washington Blues; Minute Men of '76; National Grays; Garde Lafayette; Zouaves. Mustered into federal service 24 April 1861 as 18th Pennsylvania Volunteer Infantry Regiment, mustered out 7 August 1861 at Philadelphia
- 1870 Pennsylvania Militia redesignated Pennsylvania National Guard by Act of Legislature 1870
- 1866 Perpetuated 1866-1878 by Weccacoe Legion and State Fencibles Infantry Corps. Weccacoe Legion originated in August 1861 in Weccacoe Volunteer Fire Company and Baxter's Fire Zouaves which formed the nucleus of the 72nd Pennsylvania Infantry Regiment, in federal service 10 August 1861 – 24 August 1864 this regiment also contained veterans of the 18th Pennsylvania Volunteer Infantry Regiment, alongside the 69th Pennsylvania Infantry Regiment in federal service 19 August 1861 - 1 July 1865.
- 1879 Weccacoe Legion expanded and redesignated 31 July 1879 as 3rd Regiment Infantry, Pennsylvania National Guard
- 1898 Mustered into federal service 9 May 1898 as 3rd Pennsylvania Volunteer Infantry Regiment. Mustered out 22 October 1898 at Philadelphia
- 1916 3rd Infantry Regiment mustered into federal service 1 July 1916 for Mexican Border service. Mustered out 18 October 1916
- 1917 Called into federal service 25 March 1917 and mustered on 28 March 1917 at Philadelphia
- 1917 Consolidated 11 October 1917 with 10th Infantry Regiment, Pennsylvania National Guard to form 110th Infantry Regiment, 28th Infantry Division. Demobilized 28 May 1919 at Camp Dix, New Jersey
- 1919 Reorganized as 3rd Infantry, Pennsylvania National Guard, 16 October 1919 in Philadelphia
- 1921 3rd Infantry Regiment and 6th Infantry Regiment consolidated and redesignated 1 April 1921 as 111th Infantry
- 1941 Inducted into federal service 17 February 1941 at Philadelphia
- 1945 Inactivated 22 November 1946 at Camp Anza, California
- 1947 Reorganized with headquarters federally recognized 27 February 1947 at Philadelphia, as elements of 111th Regimental Combat Team
- 1959 Reorganized and redesignated 1 June 1959 as 111th Infantry, a parent regiment under the Combat Arms Regimental System, to consist of 1st and 2nd Battle Groups, elements of the 28th Infantry Division
- 1963 Reorganized 1 April 1963 to consist of 1st and 2nd Battalions
- 1968 Reorganized 17 February 1968 with 1st Brigade 28th Infantry Division redesignated 56th Brigade, 42 Infantry Division, with 2nd Battalion, 111th Infantry attached.
- 1976 Reorganized 15 April 1975 and redesignated 56th Brigade, 28th Infantry Division, with 1st and 2nd Battalions 111th Infantry attached

== Campaign participation ==
=== American Revolutionary War ===
- Battle of Trenton
- Battle of Princeton
- Battle of Brandywine
- Battle of Germantown

=== War of 1812 ===
- Streamer without inscription (War of 1812 Streamer)

=== American Civil War ===
- Peninsula
- Manassas
- Antietam
- Fredericksburg
- Chancellorsville
- Gettysburg
- Wilderness
- Spotsyvania
- Cold Harbor
- Petersburg
- Virginia 1863
- Bull Run (Additional streamer awarded to Norris City Rifles (Norristown))
- Vickburg (Additional streamer awarded to Norris City Rifles (Norristown))
- Appomattox (Additional streamer awarded to Norris City Rifles (Norristown))
- Virginia 1861 (Additional streamer awarded to Norris City Rifles (Norristown))
- North Carolina 1862 (Additional streamer awarded to Norris City Rifles (Norristown))
- Kentucky 1863 (Additional streamer awarded to Norris City Rifles (Norristown))
- Mississippi 1863 (Additional streamer awarded to Norris City Rifles(Norristown))
- Tennessee 1863 (Additional streamer awarded to Norris City Rifles (Norristown))

=== Spanish-American War ===
- Puerto Rico (Additional streamer awarded to Company C (Kutztown))

=== World War I ===
- Aisne-Marne (Third Battle of the Aisne)
- Champagne-Marne (Second Battle of the Marne)
- Oise-Marne
- Meuse-Argonne Offensive
- Champagne 1918
- Lorraine 1918

=== World War II ===
- Central Pacific
- Eastern Mandates
- Western Pacific
- Northern France (Additional streamer awarded to Norris City Rifles (Norristown))
- Southern France (Additional Streamer awarded to Company C (Kutztown))
- Rhineland (Additional Streamer awarded to Company C (Kutztown))
- Central Europe (Additional Streamer awarded to Company C (Kutztown))

=== Kosovo ===
- Kosovo Ground Campaign

=== Iraq War ===
- Operation Iraqi Freedom

== Lineage of precursor units ==
=== Provisional Headquarters Company, 6th Infantry Regiment (PAARNG) ===
- Organized 31 December 1914 in the Pennsylvania National Guard at Philadelphia as the provisional Headquarters Company, 6th Infantry Regiment
- Mustered into federal service 7 July 1916 at Philadelphia
- Reorganized 7 September 1916 as Headquarters Company, 6th Infantry Regiment
- Mustered out of federal service 28 February 1917
- Drafted into federal service 5 August 1917
- Consolidated 11 October 1917 with Headquarters Company, 18th Infantry Regiment (organized in 1914), and consolidated unit reorganized and redesignated as Headquarters Company, 111th Infantry, an element of the 28th Division
- Demobilized 13 May 1919 at Camp Dix, New Jersey
- Former Headquarters Company, 6th Infantry Regiment, reorganized 1 November 1919 in the Pennsylvania National Guard at Philadelphia as Headquarters Company, 6th Infantry
- Redesignated 1 April 1921 as Headquarters Company, 111th Infantry, an element of the 28th Division
- Federally recognized 5 August 1921

=== Hospital Corps, 6th Infantry Regiment (PAARNG) ===
- Organized 1 May 1903 in the Pennsylvania National Guard at Philadelphia as the Hospital Corps, 6th Infantry Regiment
- Redesignated 20 December 1915 as the Sanitary Detachment, 6th Infantry Regiment
- Mustered into federal service 7 July 1916 at Philadelphia
- Mustered out 28 February 1917
- Drafted into federal service 5 August 1917
- Consolidated 11 October 1917 with the Sanitary Detachment, 18th Infantry Regiment (organized in 1903), and consolidated unit reorganized and redesignated as the Sanitary Detachment, 111th Infantry, an element of the 28th Division
- Demobilized 13 May 1919 at Camp Dix, New Jersey
- Former Sanitary Detachment, 6th Infantry Regiment, reorganized 7 August 1920 in the Pennsylvania National Guard at Philadelphia as the Sanitary Detachment, 6th infantry
- Redesignated 1 April 1921 as the Medical Department Detachment, 111th Infantry, an element of the 28th Division
- Federally recognized 29 July 1921
- Redesignated 1 May 1940 as the Medical Detachment, 111th Infantry
- Inducted into federal service 17 February 1941 at Philadelphia
- 111th Infantry relieved 17 February 1942 from assignment to the 28th Division, and reorganized as a Separate Regiment
- Assigned to the Eastern Defense Command on 30 April 1942
- Attached to the Chesapeake Bay Sector on 8 February 1943
- Relocated to Camp Pendleton, Virginia on 15 October 1943
- Staged at Camp Stoneman, California on 3 November 1943
- Departed San Francisco Port of Embarkation on 9 November 1943
- Arrived Hawaii on 12 November 1943, and assigned to the Central Pacific Base Command
- 1/111th Infantry Regiment Assaulted Kwajalein Atoll on 31 January 1944, and remained there as the Garrison Force
- Company I Assaulted Ujelang Atoll near Eniwetok on 22 April 1944
- The regiment reassembled, and moved to Peleliu on 1 February 1945, where they were attached to the Western Base Command on 15 May 1945
- The 111th Infantry Regiment returned to the Los Angeles Port of Embarkation on 21 November 1945, where they moved to Camp Anza to prepare for Inactivation
- Inactivated 22 November 1945 Camp Anza, California
- Reorganized and federally recognized 29 March 1948 at Philadelphia
- Reorganized and redesignated 1 December 1948 as the Medical Company, 111th Infantry
- Home Station: Philadelphia

== Commanders of 1st Battalion ==
- LTC Albert Yeo 1963–64
- LTC George B. Flanagan 1964–70
- LTC William P. Sandy 1970–71
- LTC Edward M. Huber 1971–75
- LTC Charles G. Huch 1975–77
- LTC George W. Lynch 1977–80
- LTC Richard A. Daddona JR. 1980–84
- LTC George W. Schuler 1984–84
- LTC Joseph T. Flatley 1985–86
- LTC Herman R. Agler 1986–88
- LTC George P. Bennett Jr. 1988–91
- LTC Wille E. Jones Jr. 1991–95
- LTC Jerry G. Beck Jr. 1995–98
- LTC Joel Wierenga 1998–2001
- LTC Allen Ponsini 2001–04
- LTC Marc Ferraro 2004–07
- LTC Mark O'Hanlon 2007–10
- LTC Michael E. Wegscheider 2010–14
- LTC Pershing W. Markle Jr. 2014–17
- LTC Andrew P. O'Connor 2017–19
- LTC Samuel Cartee 2019–22
- LTC David W. Fittipoldi 2022-25
- LTC Michael P. Tier 2025-Present

== Distinctive unit insignia ==
- Description

A Gold color metal and enamel device 1 1/4 inches (3.2 cm) in height overall consisting of an oval Azure a reproduction of the statue of Benjamin Franklin, by R. Tait McKenzie, affronté Or

- Symbolism

The field is blue for Infantry. Benjamin Franklin was the organizer of the "Associators", to which organization the 111th Infantry traces its history

- Background

The distinctive unit insignia was approved on 27 June 1929

- Banner

The 111th Infantry Regiment is the only regiment in the United States Armed Forces, in any branch, that continues to employ the Franklin Flag of John Paul Jones.

== Coat of arms ==
=== Blazon ===
- Shield

Azure, on a saltire Argent voided Gules a fleur-de-lis Or; on a canton of the second a fess Sable charged with three plates

- Crest

That for the regiments and separate battalions of the Pennsylvania Army National Guard: On a wreath of the colors Argent and Azure, a lion rampant guardant Proper holding in dexter paw a naked scimitar Argent, hilted Or, and in sinister an escutcheon Argent on a fess Sable three plates Motto NULLA VESTIGIA RETRORSUM (No Steps Backward)

=== Symbolism ===
- Shield

The shield is blue for Infantry. The saltire is for the American Civil War service and the fleur-de-lis for World War I service. The canton represents the shield that appeared on the "Associators'" flag, indicating the Revolutionary War service of the organization. The silver saltire has been voided with red in similitude to the colors of the uniforms of the Pennsylvania troops as prescribed by General George Washington in 1779. The motto was used by the 3d Infantry, Pennsylvania National Guard, for a number of years

- Crest

The crest is that of the Pennsylvania Army National Guard.

=== Background ===
The coat of arms was approved on 13 June 1929
