= Panther City Fencibles =

The Panther City Fencibles is the name of two separate units of the Texas Military Forces, the latter being the notional — but not literal — continuation of the former.

== Early organization ==
The Panther City Fencibles were established as a militia company of the Texas Volunteer Guard in 1883 with the amalgamation of the Lloyd Rifles and the Fort Worth Fencibles. In 1886 it was designated Company K of the 4th Texas Regiment. During the 1893 inauguration of Grover Cleveland as President of the United States, a 55-man contingent of the unit represented Texas during the inaugural parade. At the time of the Spanish–American War, it was integrated into the 2nd Texas Volunteer Infantry and was awaiting embarkation in Key West, Florida for overseas service at the time of the war's end.

== Later organization ==
4th Regiment
- Country: United States
- Allegiance: Texas
- Role: Civil affairs
- Nickname(s): Panther City Fencibles
- Motto(s): Sempre Caveo

Commanders
- Current commander: COL Robert Hastings

Insignia
- Identification symbol

The 27th Battalion of the Texas Defense Guard — later called the Texas State Guard — was activated in 1941, deactivated in 1947, reactivated and redesignated the 5th Regiment the following year, went through several other name changes, and was ultimately designated the 4th Regiment on 1 July 1993. At the time of its final designation it was also given the special designation Panther City Fencibles in homage to the former unit.

As of the 2000s, the unit was headquartered at the Shoreview Armory in Fort Worth, Texas, colloquially known as "Panther City". Its area of operations encompasses northwest and north central Texas and its battalions are posted in Weatherford, Decatur, and Arlington. The regiment is a civil affairs unit.

== See also ==
- Texas Air National Guard
- Texas National Guard
