= East Hanover Township =

East Hanover Township may refer to the following townships in the United States:

- East Hanover Township, New Jersey, in Morris County
- East Hanover Township, Dauphin County, Pennsylvania
- East Hanover Township, Lebanon County, Pennsylvania
