= Henry K. Fluck =

US Army major general (1912–1989)

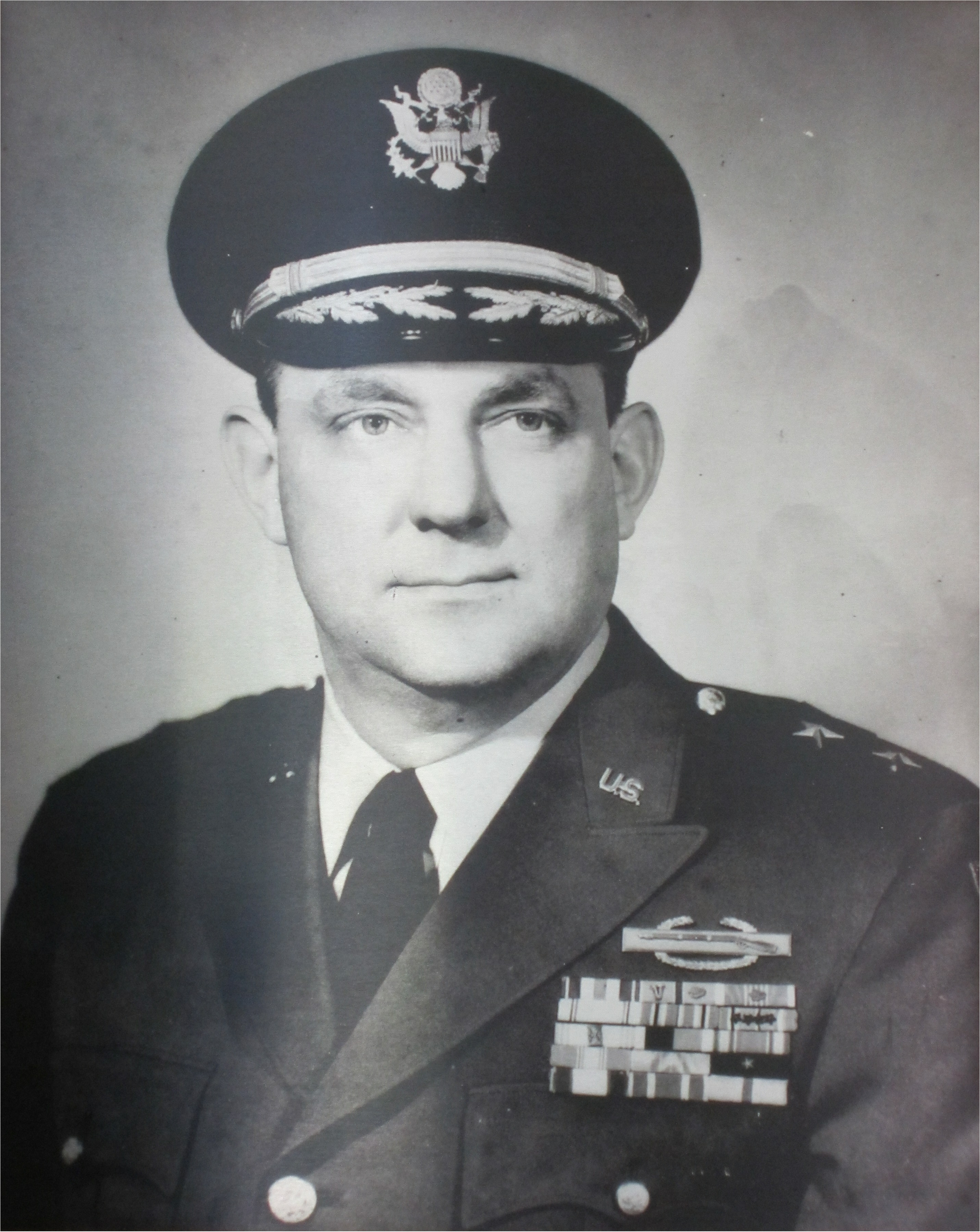
- Fluck as commander of the 28th Infantry Division, c. 1953
- Born: September 2, 1912; Ralphton, Pennsylvania, US
- Died: September 18, 1989 (aged 77); Somerset, Pennsylvania, US
- Burial place: Somerset County Memorial Park, Somerset, Pennsylvania, US
- Education: United States Army Command and General Staff College
- Spouse: Mabel Ann Dunlap (m. 1937–1989)
- Children: 2
- Military career
- Service: United States Army; Pennsylvania National Guard; United States Army Reserve
- Service years: 1928–1972
- Rank: Major General (Army); Lieutenant General (Retired list)
- Service number: 0415805
- Unit: U.S. Army Infantry Branch
- Commands: Company C, 110th Infantry Regiment; Company L, 329th Infantry Regiment; Headquarters and Headquarters Company, 75th Infantry Division; 1st Battalion, 289th Infantry Regiment; 110th Infantry Regiment; Nuremberg Military District; 28th Infantry Division; 79th Army Reserve Command
- Wars: World War II; Korean War
- Awards: Army Distinguished Service Medal; Silver Star; Legion of Merit
- Other work: Chief Engineer, Latrobe Construction Company; Director of Construction, Pennsylvania General State Authority

Henry K. Fluck (2 September 1912 – 18 September 1989) was an American construction engineer and military officer from Pennsylvania. He served in the United States Army, Pennsylvania National Guard, and United States Army Reserve for over 40 years and attained the rank of major general. A veteran of World War II and the Korean War, he commanded the 28th Infantry Division and the 79th Army Reserve Command, and his awards and decorations included the Army Distinguished Service Medal, Silver Star, and Legion of Merit.

A native of Ralphton, Pennsylvania, Fluck was raised and educated in Somerset and was a 1930 graduate of Somerset Area High School. He enlisted in the National Guard's 28th Infantry Division at age 15 in 1928, and continued to serve after high school while pursuing a civilian career as a construction engineer.

With the army expanding for World War II, Fluck received his commission as a second lieutenant February 1941. He served in the European theater as the commander of several companies in succession, followed by command of 1st Battalion, 289th Infantry Regiment. He was promoted through the ranks to lieutenant colonel, and his wartime decorations included the Silver Star.

After the war, Fluck commanded his original unit, the 110th Infantry Regiment with the rank of colonel. During the Korean War, the 28th Division was activated and assigned to service in West Germany; Fluck commanded the 110th Infantry and was later assigned to command the Nuremberg Military District.

In 1953, Fluck was assigned as assistant division commander of the 28th Infantry Division with the rank of brigadier general. In 1955, he was promoted to major general as commander of the division. He remained in command until 1967, when he was assigned to United States Army Reserve active duty as assistant deputy commander for mobilization at Headquarters, Continental Army Command. He was subsequently appointed to command the 79th Army Reserve Command, which he led until retiring from the military in 1972.

== Early life ==
Henry Kimmel Fluck was born in Ralphton, Pennsylvania on 2 September 1912, a son of Guy Brallier Fluck and Emily Julia (Kimmel) Fluck. He was raised and educated in Somerset, Pennsylvania, and was a 1930 graduate of Somerset Area High School. Fluck enlisted in the Pennsylvania National Guard at age 15 in February 1928, joining Company C, 110th Infantry Regiment as a private. He advanced through the enlisted ranks to become first sergeant of the company in June 1935, and he continued to serve until February 1941.

Fluck studied engineering at institutions including International Correspondence Schools of Scranton, Pennsylvania. While serving in the National Guard, Fluck pursued a civilian career as a construction engineer. This included working as chief engineer for the Latrobe Construction Company. He later worked for the state as director of construction for the Pennsylvania General State Authority.

In 1937, Fluck married Mabel Ann Dunlap. They were the parents of two children, Carole Ann and Henry K. Jr.

== Start of career ==
On 8 February 1941, Fluck was commissioned in Company C as a second lieutenant of Infantry. When the 110th Infantry was activated for World War II, he was a platoon leader, and he subsequently served as company executive officer, followed by assignment as commander of the company. He was promoted to first lieutenant in April 1942 and served with the 110th Infantry until June 1942. From June to December 1942, Fluck commanded Company L, 329th Infantry Regiment, a unit of the 83rd Infantry Division. He was promoted to captain in December 1942.

Fluck was assigned to the 75th Infantry Division on 9 January 1943 and appointed to command the division's Headquarters and Headquarters Company. He was then assigned first as executive officer, and later commander of the 75th Division's 1st Battalion, 289th Infantry Regiment. He commanded the battalion through the 1943 iteration of the Louisiana Maneuvers and sailed with it to the European theater, where he took part in the Battle of the Bulge, Western Allied invasion of Germany, and Rhineland campaign. He was promoted to major in June 1943 and lieutenant colonel on February 15, 1945. Fluck received several awards and decorations for his wartime service, including the Silver Star, Bronze Star Medal, and French Croix de Guerre with Palm.

=== Silver Star citation ===
According to a March 1945 newspaper article, Fluck's Silver Star citation read:

On December 26, 1944, in Belgium, while still a major, Fluck, with his battalion on the defensive and the enemy infiltrating and attacking through a gap in the right flank, arrived at the Company "C" position, where the company commander, executive officer and first sergeant were missing and where the company was on the verge of wavering under attack. Crawling from foxhole to foxhole under heavy enemy fire, he inspired and encouraged his men, enabling them to successfully repulse the attack by early morning. He further demonstrated his leadership and courage when artillery fell 20 feet from him, inflicting casualties. Twice knocked from his feet, he recovered quickly and set an example from his men, as he directed them and saw that first aid was administered promptly. The cool fearlessness, personal bravery and outstanding leadership displayed by Fluck, reflects great credit upon himself and is highly commendable.

Unit: Headquarters, 75th Infantry Division Order: General Orders No. 19 (1945)

== Continued career ==
After returning to the United States in May 1946, Fluck played a lead role in reorganizing the 110th Infantry Regiment, and he was appointed regimental executive officer. In 1947, Fluck was assigned as regimental commander, and he was promoted to colonel in August 1948. In September 1951, the 28th Division was called to active duty for the Korean War, and Fluck led the 110th Infantry during training at Camp Atterbury, Indiana. He remained in command when the division was assigned to West Germany. In October 1952, Fluck was assigned as deputy commander of the Nuremberg Military District, and he was subsequently assigned as district commander.

=== Military education ===
In 1941, Fluck completed the Light and Heavy Weapons Course at the Fort Benning Infantry School. He completed the New Division Officer Course in 1942. In 1943, he completed the Infantry Officer Advanced Course. Later that year, he graduated from the New Division Officer Refresher Course and the United States Army Command and General Staff College.

In 1951, Fluck completed the Orientation Course for Infantry Officers, and he graduated from the National Guard Division Officer Refresher Course every year from 1954 to 1957. In 1956, Fluck completed the Special Weapons and Guided Missile Orientation Course. In 1958, he graduated from the Senior Officer Nuclear Weapons Employment Course. From 1958 to 1964, Fluck completed annual iterations of the Combat Division Course. In 1960, Fluck graduated from the Chemical, Biological and Radiological Weapons Course. In 1962, he graduated from the Infantry Field Grade Officer Refresher Course.

== Later career ==
Fluck returned to Pennsylvania in April 1953, and was assigned as assistant division commander of the 28th Infantry Division with the rank of brigadier general. After aiding in the reorganization of the division following its return from West Germany, In October 1953 General Fluck assumed command of the division and was promoted to major general. He led the division until 1967, and was responsible for its individual and collective training during the Cold War.

In July 1967, Fluck was assigned to the United States Army Reserve as assistant deputy commander for mobilization at Headquarters, Continental Army Command. In January 1969, he was assigned as commander of the 79th Army Reserve Command in Colmar, Pennsylvania. During this command, Fluck led Army Reserve soldiers during the government's response to Hurricane Agnes in June 1972. Fluck left the military upon reaching the mandatory retirement age of 60 in September 1972.

== Retirement and death ==
In retirement, Fluck was a resident of Somerset. He served as state chairman of the American Cancer Society, vice president of the Somerset County Historical and Genealogical Society, and a member of the Sons of the American Revolution. In addition, he was a member of the American Legion and Veterans of Foreign Wars. He also served on the Pennsylvania National Guard Advisory Board and was a member of the Somerset Borough Planning Commission.

Fluck died in Somerset on 18 September 1989. He was buried at Somerset County Memorial Park in Somerset.

=== Legacy ===
In 1977, the newly constructed National Guard armory in Somerset was named for Fluck. Fluck Hall, an exhibit site that is part of the Somerset Historical Center, is named for Fluck. The Henry K. Fluck Ribbon is a state award of the Pennsylvania National Guard and is presented to recognize exceptional leadership, technical and tactical skills, and outstanding physical fitness. At his retirement, Fluck received a state promotion to lieutenant general in recognition of his more than 40 years of military service.

== Awards ==
Fluck's awards and decorations included:

=== Federal awards ===
- Army Distinguished Service Medal
- Silver Star
- Bronze Star Medal
- Army Commendation Medal with oak leaf cluster
- Army of Occupation Medal
- World War II Victory Medal
- European–African–Middle Eastern Campaign Medal
- American Campaign Medal
- American Defense Service Medal
- Armed Forces Reserve Medal with gold hourglass
- National Defense Service Medal
- Combat Infantryman Badge
- Expert Infantry Badge

=== International awards ===
- Croix de Guerre with palm (France)
- Arms of Colmar (France)

=== State awards ===
- Pennsylvania Distinguished Service Medal with laurel leaf
- Pennsylvania Meritorious Service Medal
- General Thomas J. Stewart Medal
- Pennsylvania 20 Year Medal

== Dates of rank ==
Fluck's dates of rank were:

- Private, 23 February 1928
- Sergeant, 4 January 1932
- Second Lieutenant, 8 February 1941
- First Lieutenant, 2 April 1942
- Captain, 1 December 1942
- Major, 25 June 1943
- Lieutenant Colonel, 15 February 1945
- Colonel, 7 August 1948
- Brigadier General, 9 October 1953
- Major General, 22 October 1955
- Major General (retired), 2 September 1972
- Lieutenant General (Pennsylvania retired list), 2 September 1972
