= 110th Infantry Regiment (United States) =

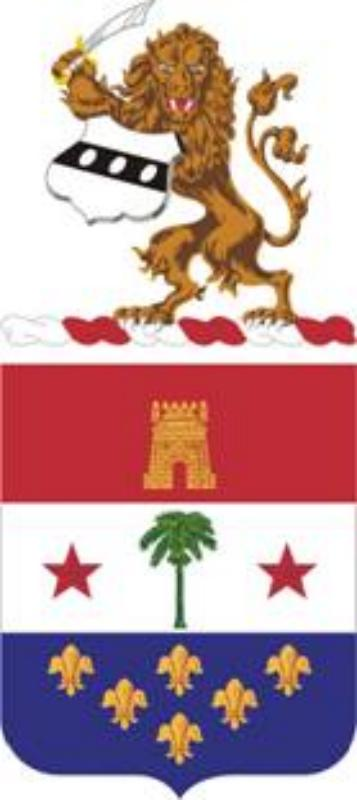
- Coat of arms
- Active: 28 November 1873–
- Country: United States
- Allegiance: US
- Branch: United States Army
- Type: Infantry
- Role: Light Infantry Infantry
- Size: Regiment (former); Battalion
- Garrison/HQ: Mount Pleasant, Pennsylvania
- Nickname: Fighting Tenth (special designation)
- Motto: "Cuiusque Devotio est Vis Regimenti" (The Devotion of Each Is The Strength Of The Regiment)
- Engagements: Spanish–American War; Philippine–American War; Mexican Expedition; World War I World War II; Korean War

Commanders
- Notable commanders: Frank Tompkins; John A. Black; Daniel Strickler; Walter E. Bare Jr.

Insignia
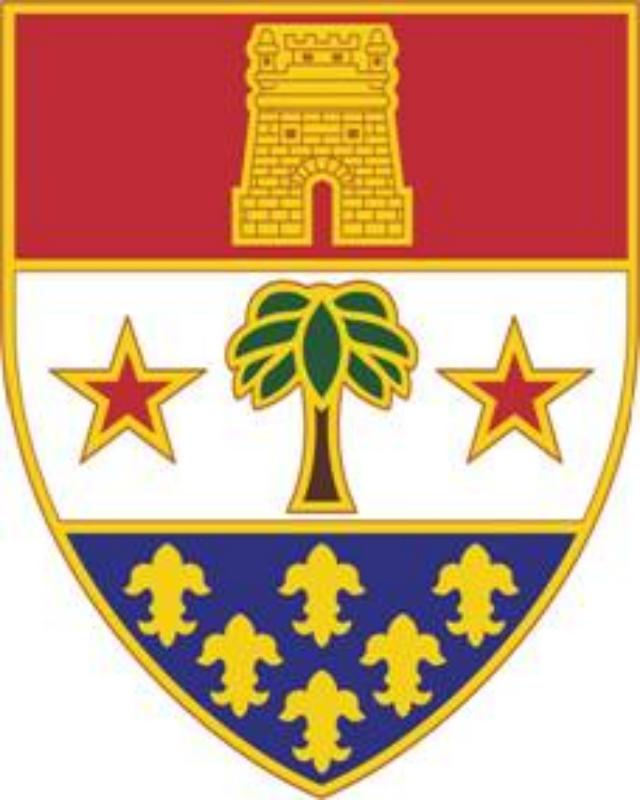
- Distinctive unit insignia

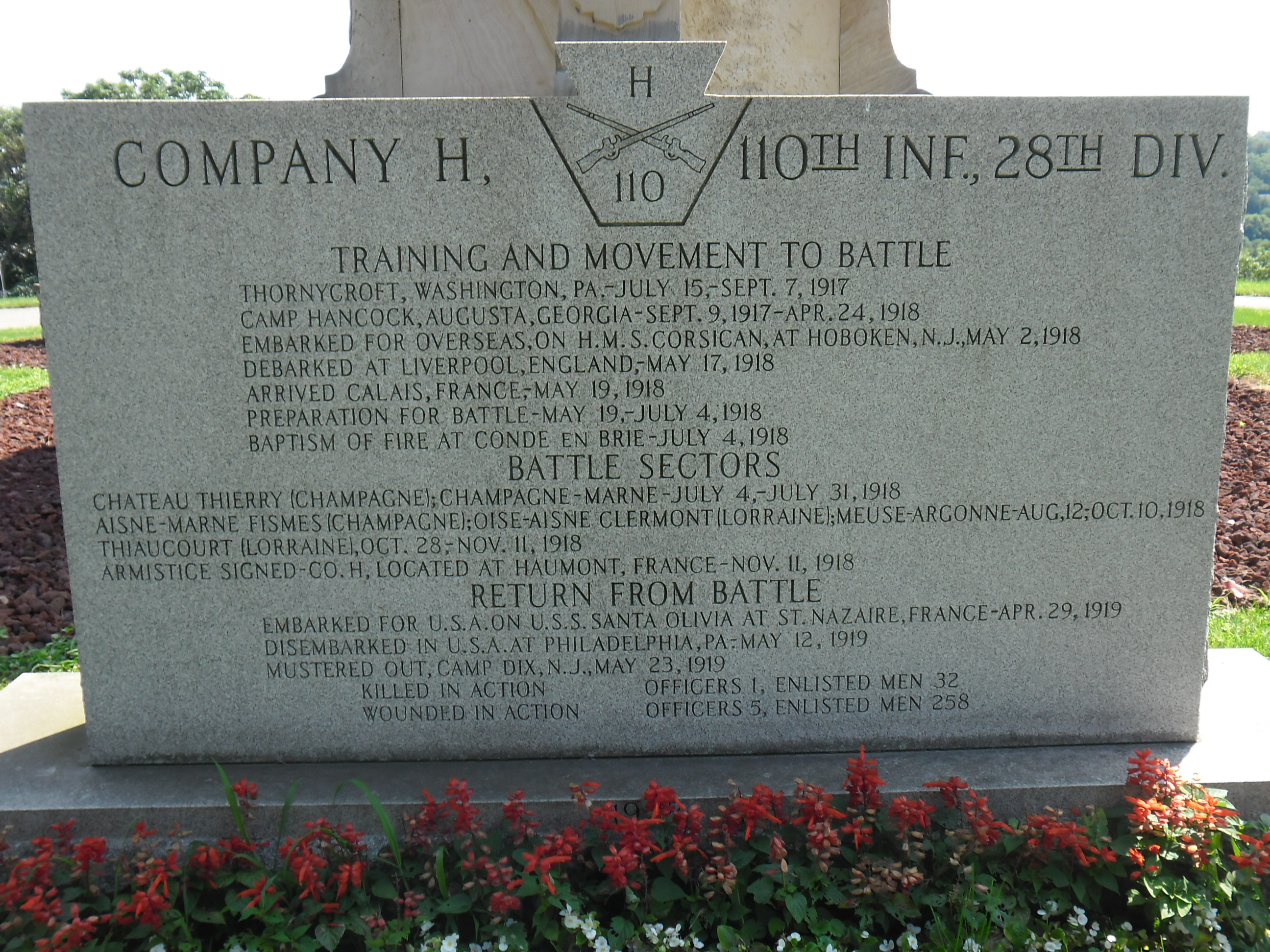
110th Infantry memorial at Washington (PA) cemetery

The 110th Infantry Regiment is a regiment of the United States Army. Its legacy unit, 1st Battalion, 110th Infantry, is a subordinate command of 2nd Brigade, 28th Infantry Division.

== History ==
=== Formation ===
The 110th Infantry Regiment was activated in the summer of 1873 as the 10th Regiment of the Pennsylvania National Guard. It was assigned a military district within the western part of the Commonwealth that comprised Westmoreland, Washington, Somerset, Blair, Fayette, Indiana, Beaver, and Greene Counties. Its first commanding of officer was Col. John A. Black who was later succeeded by Alexander L. Hawkins in November 1878.

The 10th Regiment participated in the annual State encampments of the National Guard and was activated in response to domestic labor disturbances in 1877, 1891, 1892, 1902, and 1916.

=== Spanish-American War and Philippine insurrection ===
On April 28, 1898, the Regiment was activated after the United States declared war on Spain and ordered into federal service on May 12 as part of the United States Volunteers where they mobilized out of Camp Merritt, California, near San Francisco, before embarking for the Philippines.

The 10th engaged in combat operations in the Philippines, arriving at the archipelago on July 17, 1898, under the command of Brig. Gen. Francis Vinton Greene, commander of the Philippine Expeditionary Force. While they were initially based out of Camp Dewey near Malate, Manila, the Regiment participated in numerous battles throughout the campaign to include: Malate, Manila, Filipino Outbreak, La Loma, Caloocan, San Francisco del Monte, Tuliahan River, Meycauayan, Marilao, Bocaue, Guiguinto, and Malolos. By the end of the war, the Regiment lost 21 soldiers due to combat or disease, 70 wounded, and one missing in action. On July 1, 1899, the Regiment departed for the United States on the steamship Senator and arrived at San Francisco on August 1. During their sea voyage, Col. Hawkins died on July 18. The Regiment was demobilized from the Presidio of San Francisco on August 22, 1899 and returned home.

=== Inter-war period ===
Upon return to Pennsylvania, the Regiment reorganized under Col. James E. Barnett where he served as regimental commander until replaced by Col. Richard Coulter Jr in 1907.

On June 22, 1916, the Regiment was mobilized again for active service to El Paso, Texas in support of the Pancho Villa Expedition. On July 12, the 3rd Battalion, commanded by Maj. Henry W. Coulter, was ordered to proceed to the Big Bend District. The Regiment’s mission was to guard the U.S.-Mexico border until October, when the Regiment returned home, demobilizing on October 27, 1916.

=== World War I ===
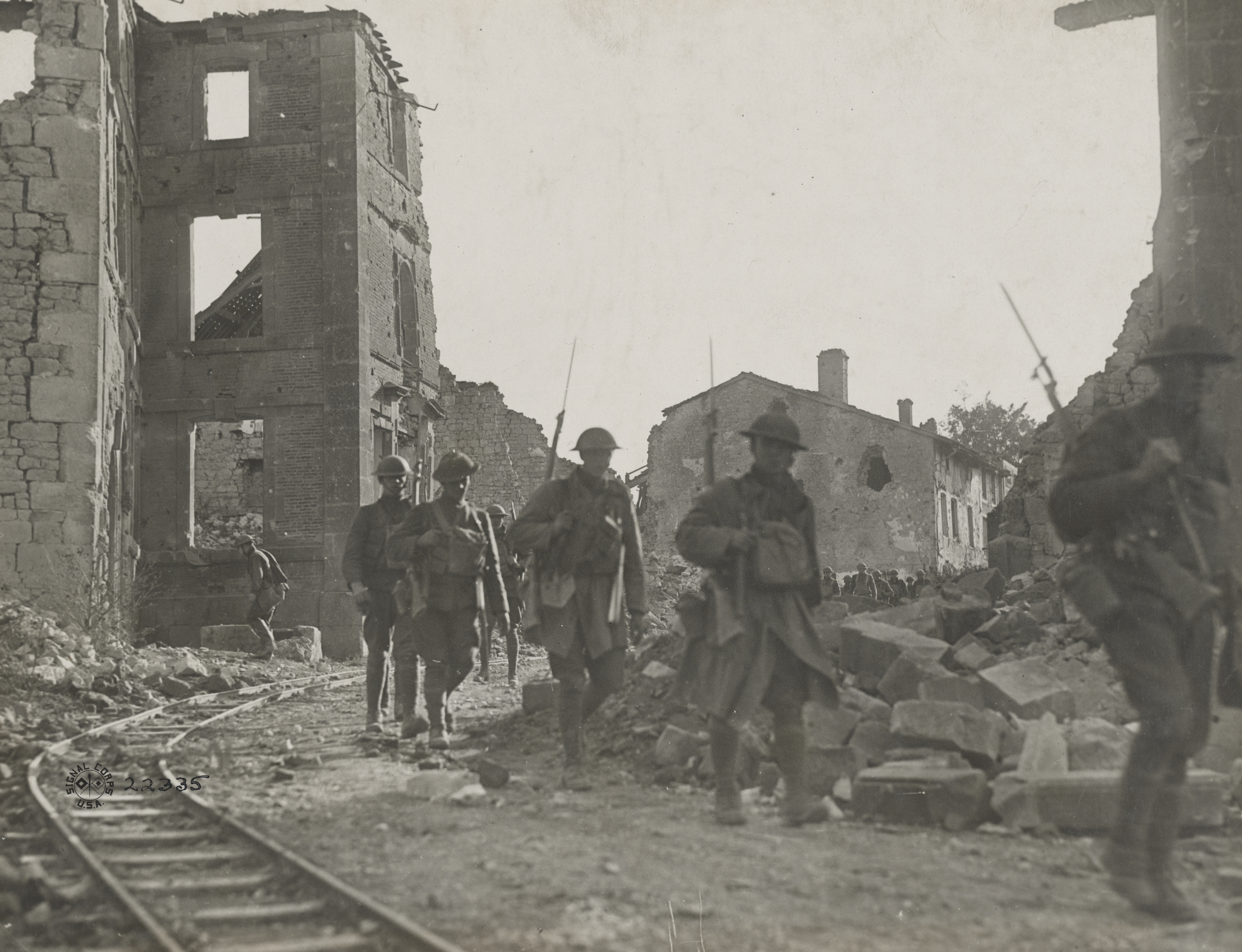
110th Infantry Regiment soldiers passing through Varennes-en-Argonne, France. 1918

During the First World War, the regiment was mobilized at home stations on July 15, 1917, and drafted in while into the Army of the United States on August 5. That month, the commander of the 10th, Col. Richard Coulter, was promoted to brigadier general and now Lt. Col. Henry W. Coulter assumed command of the regiment.

In early September, the regiment moved to Camp Hancock, Georgia, for pre-mobilization training. In October, the Army reorganized the Pennsylvania National Guard's 7th Division, designating it as the 28th Division and the regiment was redesignated from the 10th to the 110th. The strength of the infantry regiment under the new table of organization published by the War Department was 3,750 soldiers. The regiment served as part of the division's 55th Infantry Brigade, 28th Infantry Division from September 1917–May 1919

=== Interwar period ===
The 110th Infantry arrived at the port of Philadelphia on 11 May 1919 on the troopship USS Luckenbach and was demobilized 24 May 1919 at Camp Dix, New Jersey. Per the terms of the National Defense Act of 1920, it was reconstituted in the National Guard in 1921, assigned to the 28th Division, and allotted to the state of Pennsylvania. It was reorganized on 1 April 1921 by redesignation of the 10th Infantry, Pennsylvania National Guard (organized 16 October 1919; headquarters organized 20 July 1920 and federally recognized at Waynesburg, Pennsylvania) as the 110th Infantry. The regimental headquarters was relocated in 1923 to Washington, Pennsylvania. The entire regiment was called up to perform relief duties in connection with the flooding of the Schuylkill and Susquehanna Rivers in April 1936. The 110th Infantry conducted annual summer training most years at Mount Gretna, Pennsylvania, 1921–34, and Indiantown Gap, Pennsylvania, 1935–38. It was inducted into active federal service at Washington, Pennsylvania, on 17 February 1941 and moved to Indiantown Gap, where it arrived 28 February 1941.

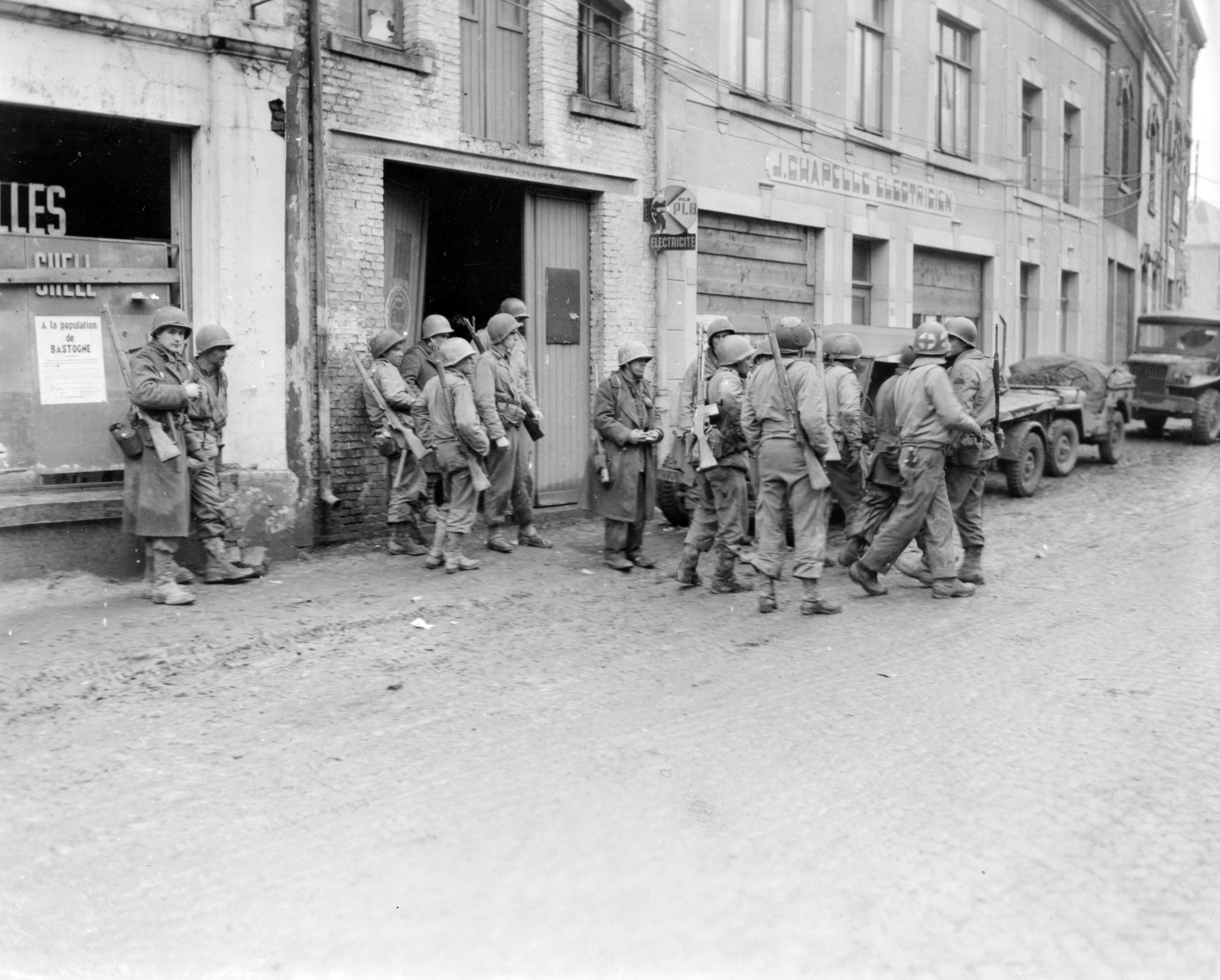
110th Infantry Regiment Soldiers in Bastogne. 19 December 1944

=== World War II ===
- Inducted into federal service February 17, 1941 at Washington.
- Based in Pembrokeshire, Wales from October 1943 to April 1944, preparing for D-Day; a memorial to those lost in the liberation of Europe was unveiled in 2019.
- Inactivated October 25, 1945 at Camp Shelby, Mississippi.
- Reorganized and federally recognized December 12, 1946 at Washington as Headquarters Company, 110th Infantry.

=== Cold-War era ===
- Ordered into active federal service September 5, 1950 at Washington.
- Headquarters Company, 110th Infantry [NGUS], organized and federally recognized July 16, 1953 at Washington.
- Released from active federal service June 15, 1954 and reverted to state control; federal recognition concurrently withdrawn from Headquarters Company, 110th Infantry (NGUS).
- Reorganized and redesignated June 1, 1959 as Headquarters Company, 1st Battle Group, 110th Infantry.

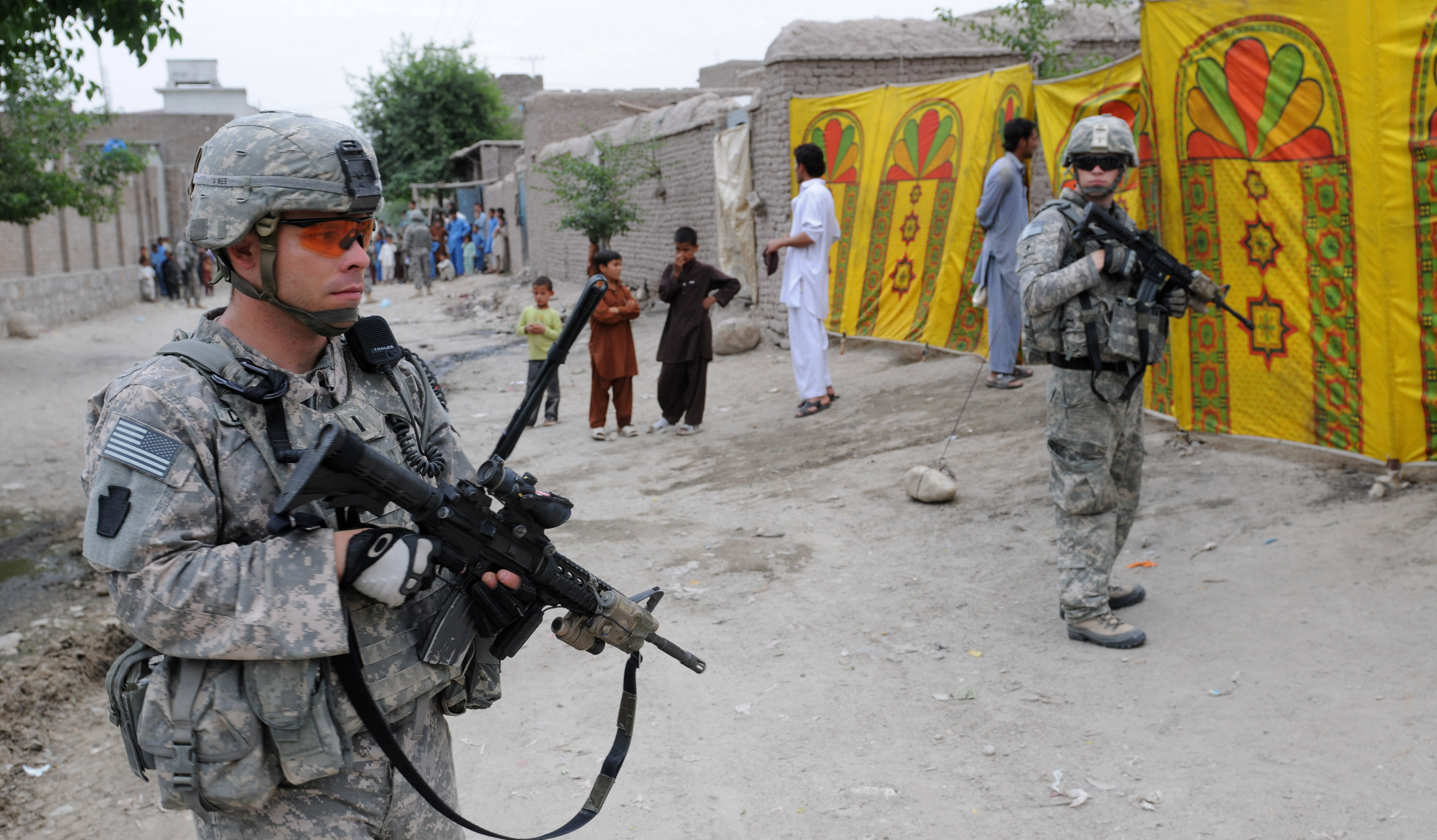
Soldiers with Company D, 1st Battalion, 110th Infantry Regiment in Jalalabad, Afghanistan. April 26, 2010

=== Global war on terror ===
1-110th Infantry Battalion task organization as of March 2014:

- Home Station: Mount Pleasant, Pennsylvania
- Company A – Indiana, Pennsylvania
- Company B – Waynesburg, Pennsylvania
- Company C – Connellsville, Pennsylvania
- Company D – Greensburg, Pennsylvania

In June 2016, 1st-110th Infantry Bn. deployed to Jordan, the United Arab Emirates, and Kuwait to train their forces.

== Notable members ==
- Thomas S. Crago (1866–1925), member of the U.S. House of Representatives
- Henry K. Fluck (1912–1989), commander of the 110th Infantry Regiment and 28th Infantry Division
- Joseph H. Thompson (1871–1928), Medal of Honor recipient, Pennsylvania State Senator, and member of the College Football Hall of Fame
