= Indiantown Gap National Cemetery =

Veterans cemetery in Lebanon County, Pennsylvania

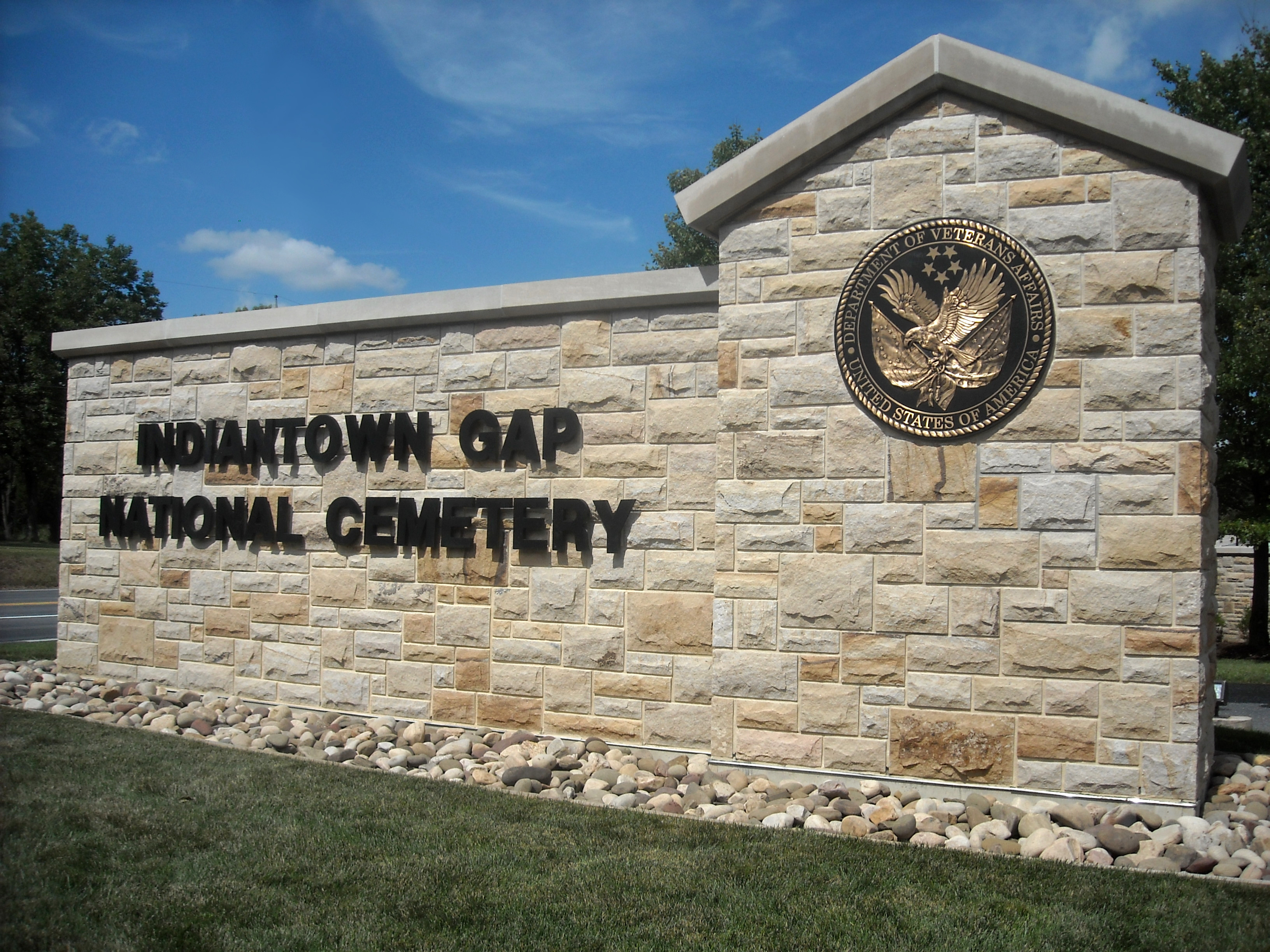
- West entrance
- Interactive map of Indiantown Gap National Cemetery

Details
- Location: East Hanover Township, Pennsylvania
- Country: United States
- Coordinates: 40°25′23″N 76°33′20″W
- Type: U.S. National Cemetery
- Size: 677 acres (274 ha)
- No. of graves: 60,000 +
- Website: Official
- Find a Grave: Indiantown Gap National Cemetery

Indiantown Gap National Cemetery is a United States National Cemetery located in East Hanover Township, in Lebanon County, Pennsylvania. Administered by the United States Department of Veterans Affairs, it occupies approximately 677 acres (2.74 km^{2}), and has over 60,000 interments, as of 2021.

== History ==
Indiantown Gap derives its name from the various Native American communities that populated the region. Starting in the 1930s, it became a training area for the United States Army and control of the facility was turned over to the Pennsylvania National Guard in 1998.

In 1976, a section of Fort Indiantown Gap Military Reservation was selected as the national cemetery for the states of Delaware, Maryland, New Jersey, Virginia and West Virginia. The Commonwealth of Pennsylvania donated land for the site to the US Veterans Administration (now known as the United States Department of Veterans Affairs), specifically the branch of the VA known as the National Cemetery Administration (NCA).

Since 1976, the Indiantown Gap National Cemetery has been administered by the NCA and is separate entity from the section of Fort Indiantown Gap assigned to the Commonwealth of Pennsylvania.

== Notable interments ==
Notable interments include:

- Robert F. Kent (1911–1982), Pennsylvania state representative and Pennsylvania Treasurer from 1957 to 1961
- Harold J. Lavell (1925–2000), US Army major general
- Bob Montgomery (1919–1998), Lightweight Boxing Champion of the World and International Boxing Hall of Fame inductee
- Rear Admiral Harley D. Nygren (1924–2019), first director of the National Oceanic and Atmospheric Administration Commissioned Officer Corps (1970–1981)
- John Shumaker (1929–1999), Pennsylvania State Senator
- Paul Vathis (1925–2002), Pulitzer Prize winning photographer

== See also ==
- List of Pennsylvania cemeteries
