= 289th Regiment =

289th Regiment may refer to:

- 289th Infantry Regiment, United States
- 289th Parachute Light Regiment, Royal Artillery
