= Fort Indiantown Gap =

National Guard training facility in Pennsylvania, US

- Lebanon County, Pennsylvania, U.S.
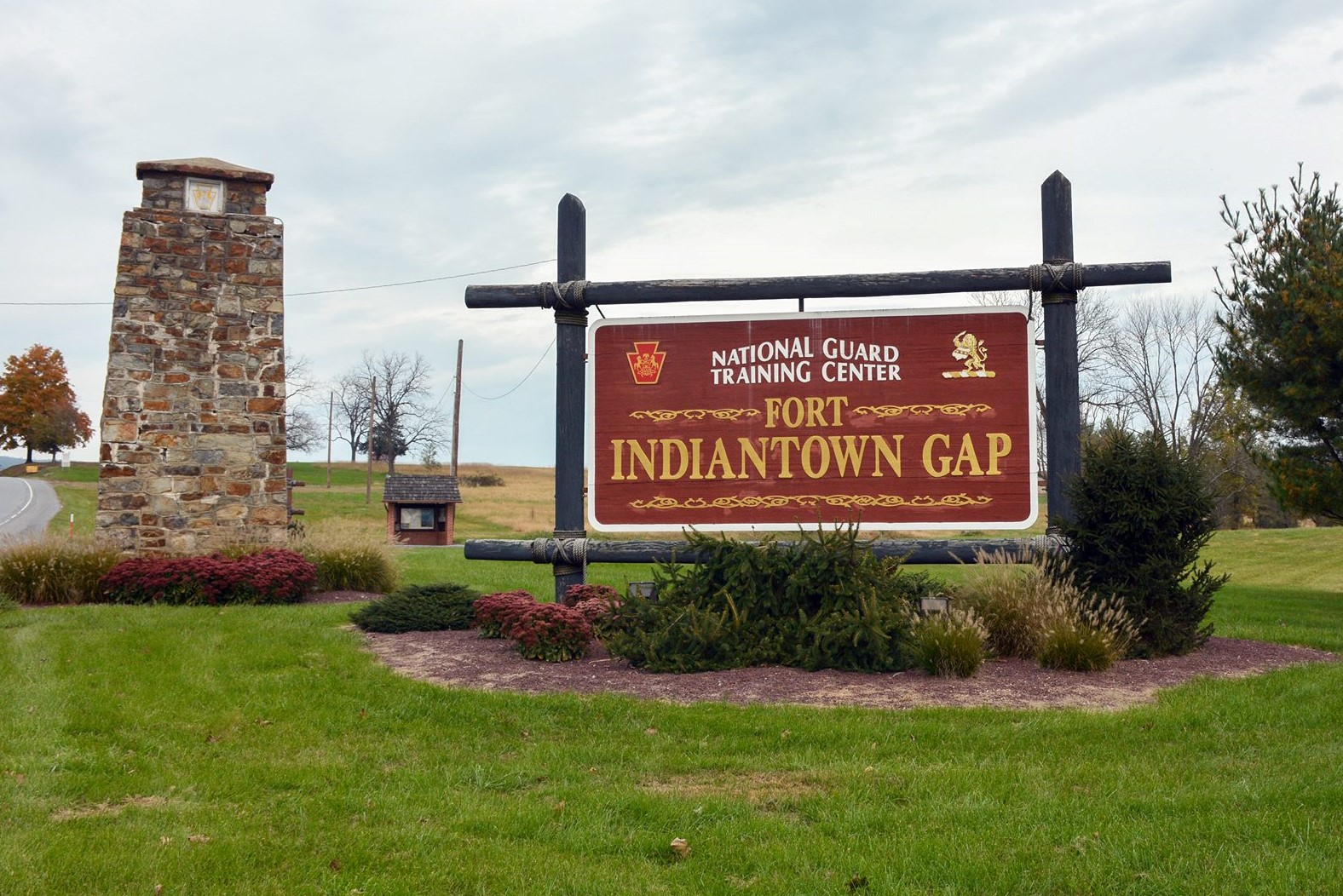

Site information
- Type: National Guard Training Site
- Controlled by: Pennsylvania
- Website: https://www.ftig.ng.mil/

Location
- Coordinates: 40°26′13″N 76°34′34″W

Site history
- Built: 1931
- In use: 1931–present

Garrison information
- Current commander: Lt. Col. Kevin Potts
- Garrison: 28th Infantry Division and 213th Area Support Group

Fort Indiantown Gap, also referred to as "The Gap" or "FIG", is a census-designated place and National Guard Training Center primarily located in East Hanover and Union townships in Lebanon County, Pennsylvania, United States. (A portion of the installation is located in eastern Dauphin County.) It is located adjacent to Interstate 81, 23 miles (37 km) northeast of Harrisburg, just north of the northern terminus of Pennsylvania Route 934 at I-81's Exit 85.

The installation is an active National Guard Training Center and serves as headquarters for the Pennsylvania Department of Military and Veterans Affairs and the Pennsylvania National Guard. The post includes about 18,000 acres (73 km^{2}) of land, with numerous ranges and training areas for the Pennsylvania National Guard and other active-duty and reserve-component military units as well as law-enforcement agencies. The reservation is protected by the Fort Indiantown Gap Police Department, a full-time department which also enforces traffic and other state laws. The force is an agency of the Department of Military and Veterans Affairs.

The installation surrounds Memorial Lake State Park and Indiantown Gap National Cemetery. It is served by the Annville, Pennsylvania post office, ZIP Code 17003. As of the 2010 census the population was 143 residents. State House, the former official residence of the Lieutenant Governor of Pennsylvania, is located on the grounds.

== History ==
The history of Fort Indiantown Gap dates to 1755, when the colonial government established several forts as defenses for settlers against the Susquehannock. Tensions had risen as the colonists encroached on the communal lands of the Susquehannock, who had long hunted and cultivated there. The Native Americans became willing allies against the British colonists as the French and Indian War began. At the onset of the war, the Susquehannock attacked colonial frontier settlements, using the passes that existed in Blue Mountain through Manada Gap, Indiantown Gap, and Swatara Gap. Because of these attacks, fortifications were established near Swatara Gap in northern Lebanon County, just east of present-day Fort Indiantown Gap, and near Manada Gap in Dauphin County.

The name Indiantown Gap was fashioned from the Native American presence and geography. “Indiantown” is derived from the many Native American villages that existed in the vicinity of the installation, and “Gap” refers to the separation in the Blue Mountains through which the creek known as Indiantown Run flows.

The current post was originally developed by the Commonwealth of Pennsylvania, on the recommendation of General Edward Martin, as a National Guard training site in 1931 after the Pennsylvania National Guard outgrew its 120-acre training site at Mount Gretna, Pennsylvania.

Over the years, the installation has served as home to the Pennsylvania National Guard as well as active units of the United States Army. In 1941, the post was officially named Indiantown Gap Military Reservation (IGMR). Martin retired from military service and later served as governor of Pennsylvania and then as a U.S. senator for Pennsylvania. After his death, the Pennsylvania General Assembly renamed the installation the Edward Martin Military Reservation, a designation that Martin himself had rejected throughout his life. The new name was never fully accepted by the military personnel who served there.

In 1975, the Secretary of the Army renamed the post Fort Indiantown Gap, in order to more closely align it with other Active Duty stations throughout the United States. Pennsylvania also reinstated the Indiantown Gap designation, which it retains today.

=== World War II expansion ===
As World War II erupted and the United States prepared to enter the conflict, Pennsylvania agreed to lease its National Guard Post to the U.S. Army for a training post. On September 30, 1940, the Commonwealth of Pennsylvania leased the reservation to the federal government for $1. A massive construction project got underway, as 13,000 workmen quickly prepared for the arrival of troops and supplies, and the U.S. Army garrison at FTIG was born.

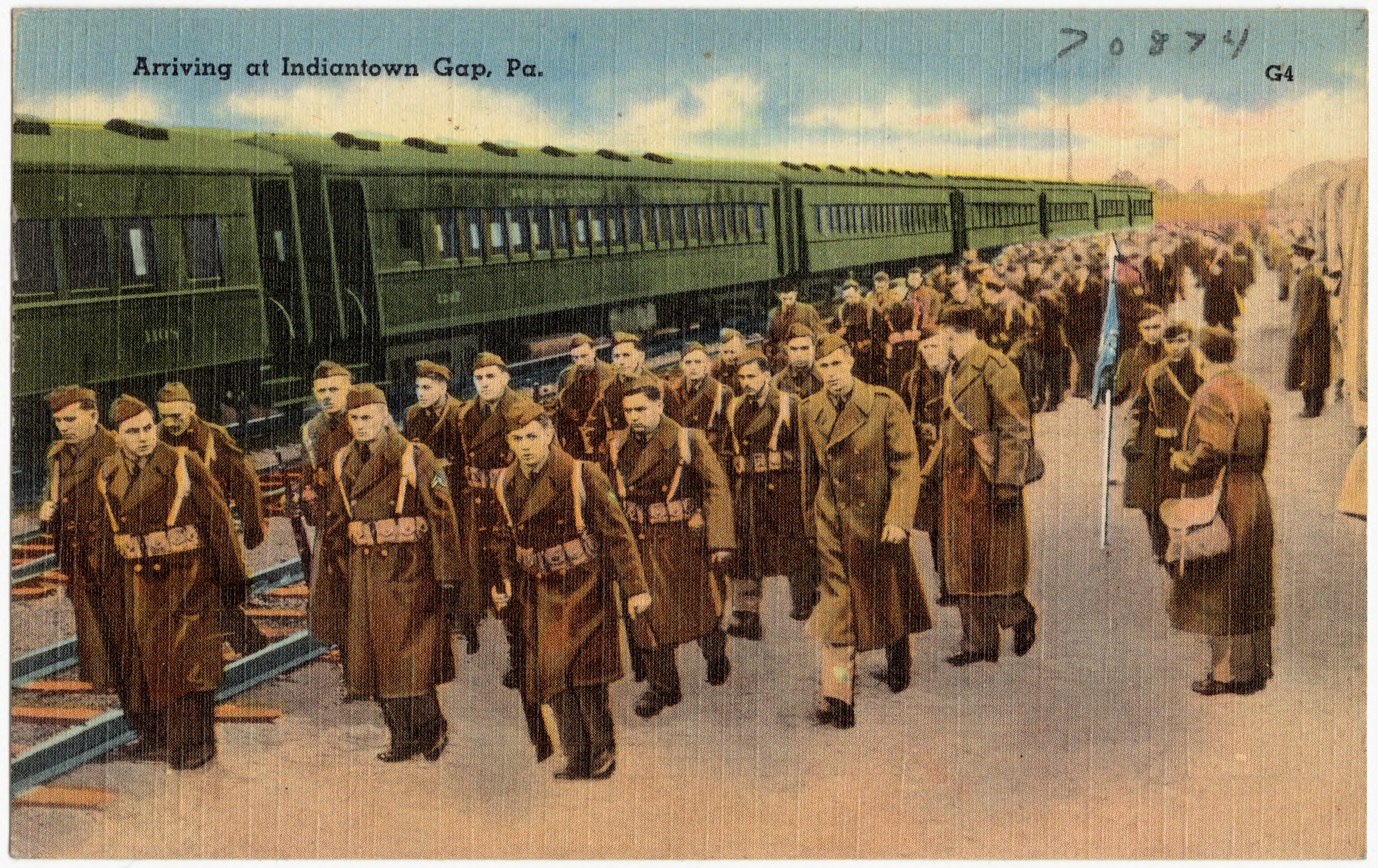
Arriving at Indiantown Gap

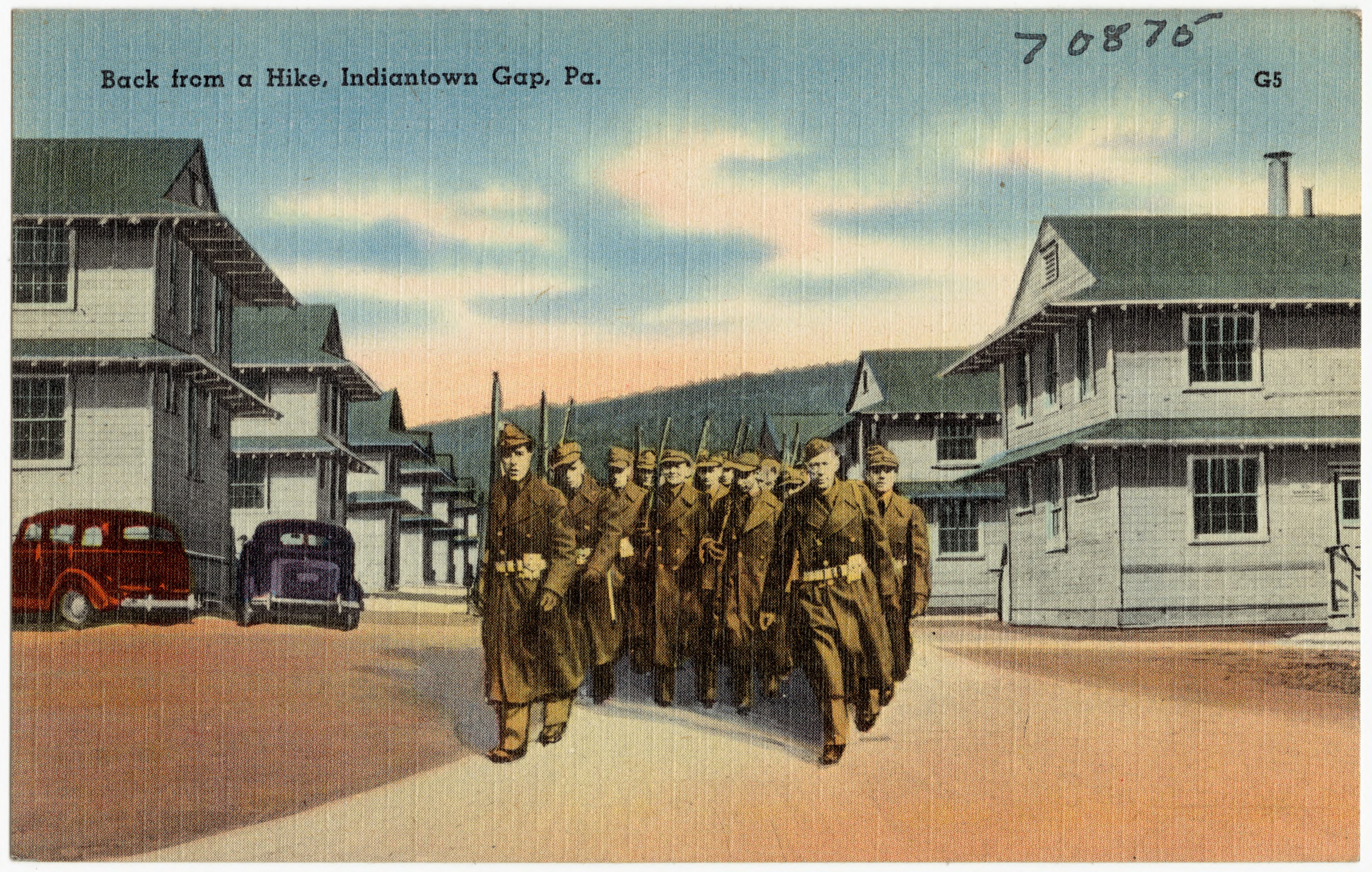
"Back from a hike" c. 1940

When the facility was completed, there were more than 1,400 buildings, including three fire stations, two guesthouses, a bus station, nine chapels, two service clubs, four huge theaters, a large sports arena and a 400-bed hospital. Nearly 800 temporary barracks buildings were located in complete regimental areas with mess halls, recreation buildings, and store rooms. Muir Army Airfield was also constructed at that time.

Indiantown Gap was dedicated March 3, 1941, and was officially named Indiantown Gap Military Reservation (IGMR). It was one of the nation's busiest Army training camps, serving as the staging area for the New York Port of Embarkation. More than 150,000 troops in eight divisions were given final training at IGMR, prior to being shipped overseas. In addition to Pennsylvania's own 28th Infantry Division, the 3rd and 5th Armored Divisions and the 1st, 5th, 37th, 77th and 95th Infantry Divisions also trained at IGMR. Once Allied Forces gained a foothold in Europe, IGMR also served as a German POW compound.

As World War II continued with ever increasing American involvement, a transportation corps training center was established for the purpose of educating soldiers who would later be used in port battalions. Three dry landships: S.S. Manada, S.S. Swatara, and the S.S. Indiantown were built at IGMR and used for Army stevedore training.

When the war ended, IGMR became a separation center for officers and enlisted men returning from overseas, mostly from Europe. More than 450,000 men were demobilized here and returned to civilian life. At its peak, the center processed more than 1,000 soldiers per day.

=== Postwar ===
From 1951 to 1953, during the Korean War, the Gap again had a strategic role as the home of the 5th Infantry Division, whose mission was to train 32,000 troops as replacements for assignment to Korea.

During the late 1960s and early 1970s, during the Vietnam War, Fort Indiantown Gap served as one of the largest Reserve Officers' Training Corps (ROTC) summer camps for the U.S. Army.

In 1975, after the US left Vietnam, the Gap served as a refugee camp for southeast Asian refugees. For eight months, more than 32,000 Vietnamese and Cambodian refugees were resettled through the installation.

In 1976, a section of Fort Indiantown Gap was selected as the new national cemetery for the states of Delaware, Maryland, New Jersey, Virginia, and West Virginia. The Commonwealth of Pennsylvania donated the land for the site to the Veterans Administration.

In 1980, the Gap again became a refugee camp when over 19,000 Cuban aliens were brought there for processing and sponsorship after the Mariel boatlift. The last Marielitos were not released from the Gap until late 1981.

In 1990, the Gap served as a mobilization and embarkation center for active, reserve, and guard units deploying to the first Persian Gulf War.

In the fall of 1991, the Gap served as the training center for the 84th and 85th PA State Police academy classes.

In July 1995, the Base Realignment and Closure Commission (BRAC) recommended closing Fort Indiantown Gap, except for minimum essential ranges, facilities, and training areas used by reserve components. Units, including the 1079th Garrison Support Unit, relocated to Fort Dix, New Jersey. The Commonwealth of Pennsylvania assumed control of the land from the federal government in 1998 and converted it back to a training site for Army National Guard and U.S. Army Reserve units.

=== Post 9/11 ===
Today, Fort Indiantown Gap is one of the busiest National Guard training centers in the country, with more than 100,000 personnel training there annually, including reserve-component and active-duty service members and law-enforcement officers. In Fiscal Year (FY) 2021, Fort Indiantown Gap was the busiest National Guard training center for the second year in a row and fifth time in the last seven years. During FY 2021, the installation hosted 113,075 personnel for a total of 727,878 “man-days” of training. Man-days are a computation of the number of personnel multiplied by the number of days they trained on post. FTIG was also the busiest training center in 2015, 2016, 2018 and 2020.

Muir Army Airfield, which is home to the 28th Expeditionary Combat Aviation Brigade and the Eastern Army National Guard Training Site, is one of the busiest airfields in the U.S. Army. In 2021, EAATS was selected to be the first unit in the Army—active-duty, National Guard or Reserve—to receive a new variant of the UH-60 Black Hawk helicopter, the UH-60V.

FTIG is home to the headquarters of the Pennsylvania Department of Military and Veterans Affairs and the Pennsylvania National Guard as well as numerous other tenant organizations. In October 2019, it was announced that Fort Indiantown Gap would be home to the Keystone State ChalleNGe Academy, a residential educational program for at-risk youth that is part of the National Guard's Youth ChalleNGe Program. The academy welcomed its first class of cadets in July 2022.

For years an "open post," Fort Indiantown Gap began construction on the first of two access-control points, or gates, in December 2021. The first gate was opened in November 2023. With this, Fort Indiantown Gap is now a "controlled access" installation.

== Tenant organizations ==
- Pennsylvania Department of Military and Veterans Affairs
- Pennsylvania National Guard
- 28th Expeditionary Combat Aviation Brigade
- Eastern Army National Guard Aviation Training Site
- 166th Regiment Regional Training Institute
- Northeast Counterdrug Training Center
- Regional Training Site - Maintenance, U.S. Army Reserve
- 211th Engineering & Installation Squadron
- Lightning Force Academy
- Air National Guard Band of the Northeast (553rd Air Force Band)
- Pennsylvania National Guard Military Museum

== Demographics ==
As of the census of 2000, there were 85 people, 33 households, and 26 families residing at the fort. The population density was 4.5 people per square mile (1.7/km^{2}). There were 37 housing units at an average density of 2.0/sq mi (0.8/km^{2}). The racial makeup of the fort was 97% White, 1% African American, and 1% from two or more races.

There were 33 households, out of which 27% had children under the age of 18 living with them, 79% were married couples living together, 3% had a female householder with no husband present, and 18% were non-families. 15% of all households were made up of individuals, and 6% had someone living alone who was 65 years of age or older. The average household size was 2.58 and the average family size was 2.81.

In the fort the population was spread out, with 17% under the age of 18, 8% from 18 to 24, 29% from 25 to 44, 34% from 45 to 64, and 12% who were 65 years of age or older. The median age was 43 years. For every 100 females, there were 84.8 males. For every 100 females age 18 and over, there were 86.8 males.

The median income for a household in the fort was $65,893, and the median income for a family was $66,607. Males had a median income of $42,250 versus $31,071 for females. The per capita income for the fort was $27,757. None of the population and none of the families were below the poverty line.

== Geography ==
The Fort Indiantown Gap census-designated place is entirely in Lebanon County, occupying the northeast part of East Hanover Township, the western part of Union Township, and a small strip of land along the southern edge of Cold Spring Township, up to the ridgecrest of Second Mountain. According to the United States Census Bureau, the CDP has a total area of 19.4 square miles (50.2 km^{2}), of which 19.2 square miles (49.8 km^{2}) are land and 0.2 square miles (0.4 km^{2}), or 0.86%, are water. The area is drained by Indiantown Run, which flows south through Indiantown Gap and into Swatara Creek, a tributary of the Susquehanna River, just south of the CDP.

== Folklore ==
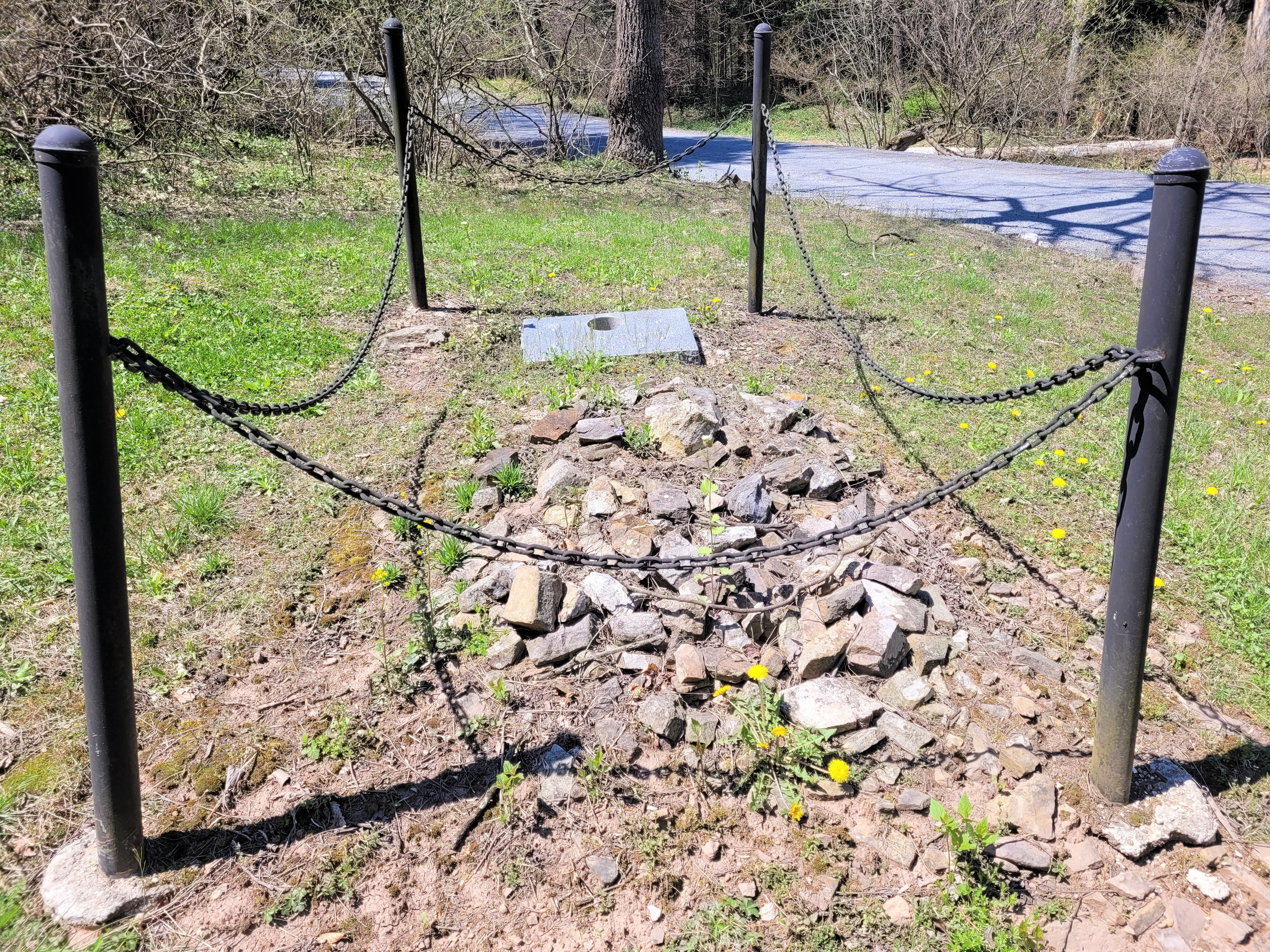
Franklin Stichler's grave along McLean Road at Fort Indiantown Gap, Pa.

An infamous 19th-century murder took place at what is now Fort Indiantown Gap and resulted in a trial of six defendants who, coincidentally, all had blue eyes and became known as the Blue Eyed Six. Four members of the group had taken out an insurance policy on Joseph Raber, an elderly man who lived in the area, and promised to take care of him until his death. As part of the conspiracy, the two other members drowned Raber in Indiantown Run in 1878.

Their murder trial, held in the county courthouse in Lebanon, received worldwide publicity after a newspaper reporter noticed they all had blue eyes and gave them the moniker Blue Eyed Six. The trial inspired Arthur Conan Doyle while he was writing "The Red-Headed League". On April 24, 1879, a jury found all six guilty of murder. On appeal, one of the six, George Zechman, was awarded a new trial and was acquitted. The other five defendants were hanged at the county jail.

One of the defendants, Franklin Stichler, was buried in a grave on his family's farm. The grave still exists along McLean Road. Another defendant, Israel Brandt, a Civil War veteran, ran a rather seedy hotel along Hotel Road. The murder site in Indiantown Run, Stichler's family farm, and the hotel site were all later encompassed by the Fort Indiantown Gap installation.

== See also ==
- Indiantown Gap National Cemetery
- Memorial Lake State Park
- List of United States Army installations
