= 1079th Garrison Support Unit =

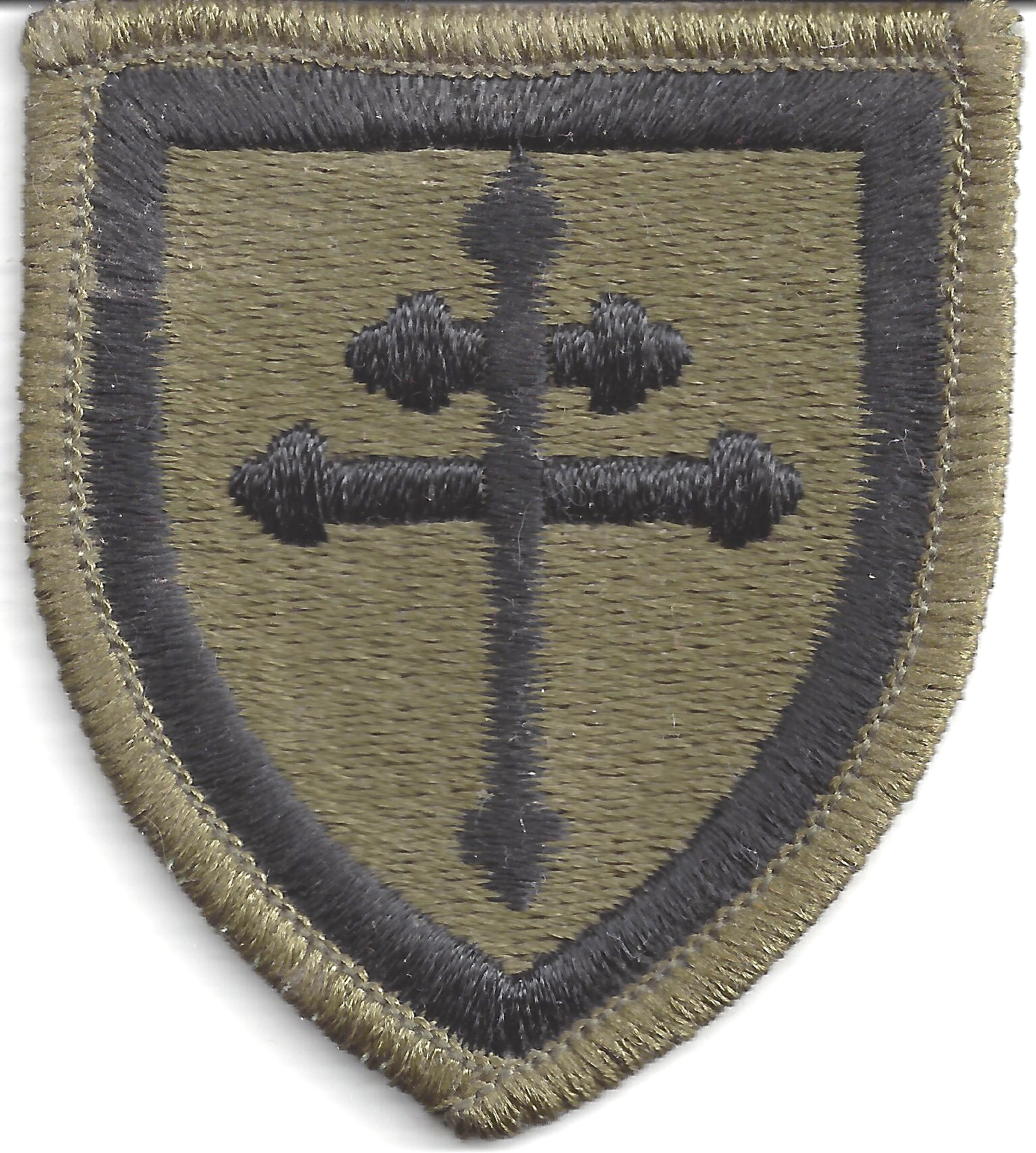
Shoulder Sleeve Insignia (subdued) of the then 79th Army Reserve Command worn by Soldiers of the 1079th USAR Garrison

The 79th Army Reserve Command, the United States Army Reserve unit was based in Colmar, Pennsylvania in the late 1960s and early 1970s, and was commanded by Henry K. Fluck. As The 1079th Garrison Support Unit (GSU), the unit was at Fort Indiantown Gap, Pennsylvania, the 1079th initially formed in 1986 under the command of Colonel Phillip Petter. The mission of the unit was to process military pay and personnel records and prepare the units for mobilizing to combat zones oversees. March 1996 the 1079th moved to Joint Base McGuire-Dix-Lakehurst, which is commonly known as Fort Dix. There the unit served as an Installation Support Battalion and mobilization readiness unit. During 1999 the 1079th supported Fort Dix in handling two major military operations. Soldiers from the unit helped process troops from hurricane-ravaged Central America in Joint Horizons I and II. They also supported post in Operation Provide Refuge. The 1079th also received many citations for their contributions and efforts in support of Kosovo refugees. In August 2008 the unit reunited at Fort Indiantown Gap to hold a discontinuation ceremony. It officially disbanded in September 2008.

== Activation for Global War on Terrorism (GWOT) ==
After the 9/11 attacks, Army Guard and Reserve units would mobilize on Activity Duty Reserve orders in support of Operation Noble Eagle. On October 25, 2001, the 1079th received provisional orders in lieu of the attacks. The 1079th's mission was to process soldiers deployed to Fort Dix. Under the command of Colonel Emil H. Philibosian, the unit along with civilian staff ensured the processing of heavy volumes of Army Reserve and National Guard units to deploy overseas in support of Operation Enduring Freedom and Iraqi Freedom.
