= Paul Vathis =

American photojournalist (1925–2002)

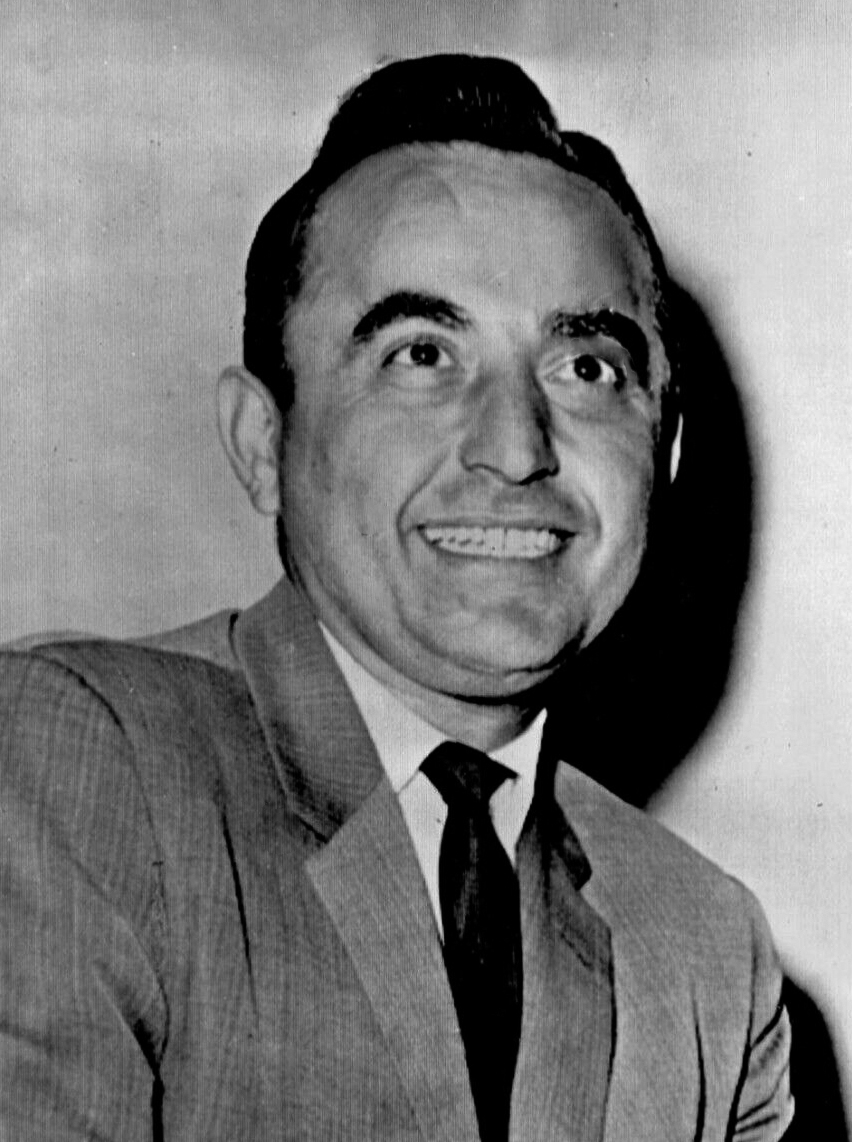
- Vathis in 1962
- Born: October 18, 1925; Jim Thorpe, Pennsylvania, U.S.
- Died: December 10, 2002 (aged 77); Mechanicsburg, Pennsylvania, U.S.
- Resting place: Indiantown Gap National Cemetery, Annville, Pennsylvania
- Occupation: Photojournalist

Paul Vathis (October 18, 1925 – December 10, 2002) was an American photojournalist. He was a photographer for the Associated Press for 56 years.

== Life ==
Vathis was one of eight children of Greek immigrant parents in Mauch Chunk, Pennsylvania in present-day Jim Thorpe, Pennsylvania. He got his start in World War II. He was a World War II Marine combat veteran, where he shot bomb damage pictures of South Pacific island caves. Before the war he had never even held a camera before. He was married to Barbara Vathis and had three children Victoria, Randy, and Stephanie. In 2002, Vathis died at age 77 in his home in Mechanicsburg, Pennsylvania. He was buried at Indiantown Gap National Cemetery in Annville, Pennsylvania.

== Career ==
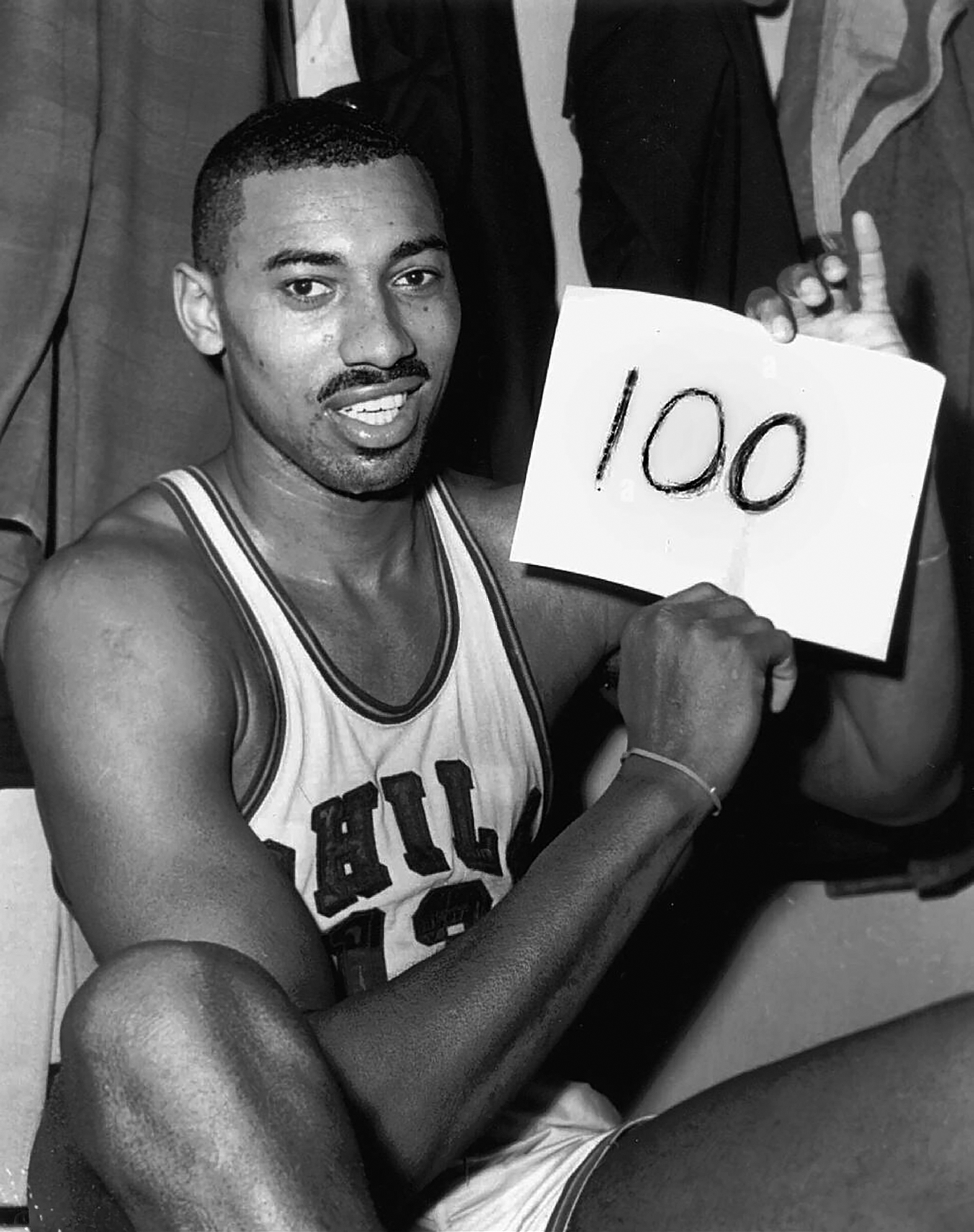
Vathis's photograph of Wilt Chamberlain displaying a sign reading "100" after his famed record 100-point game

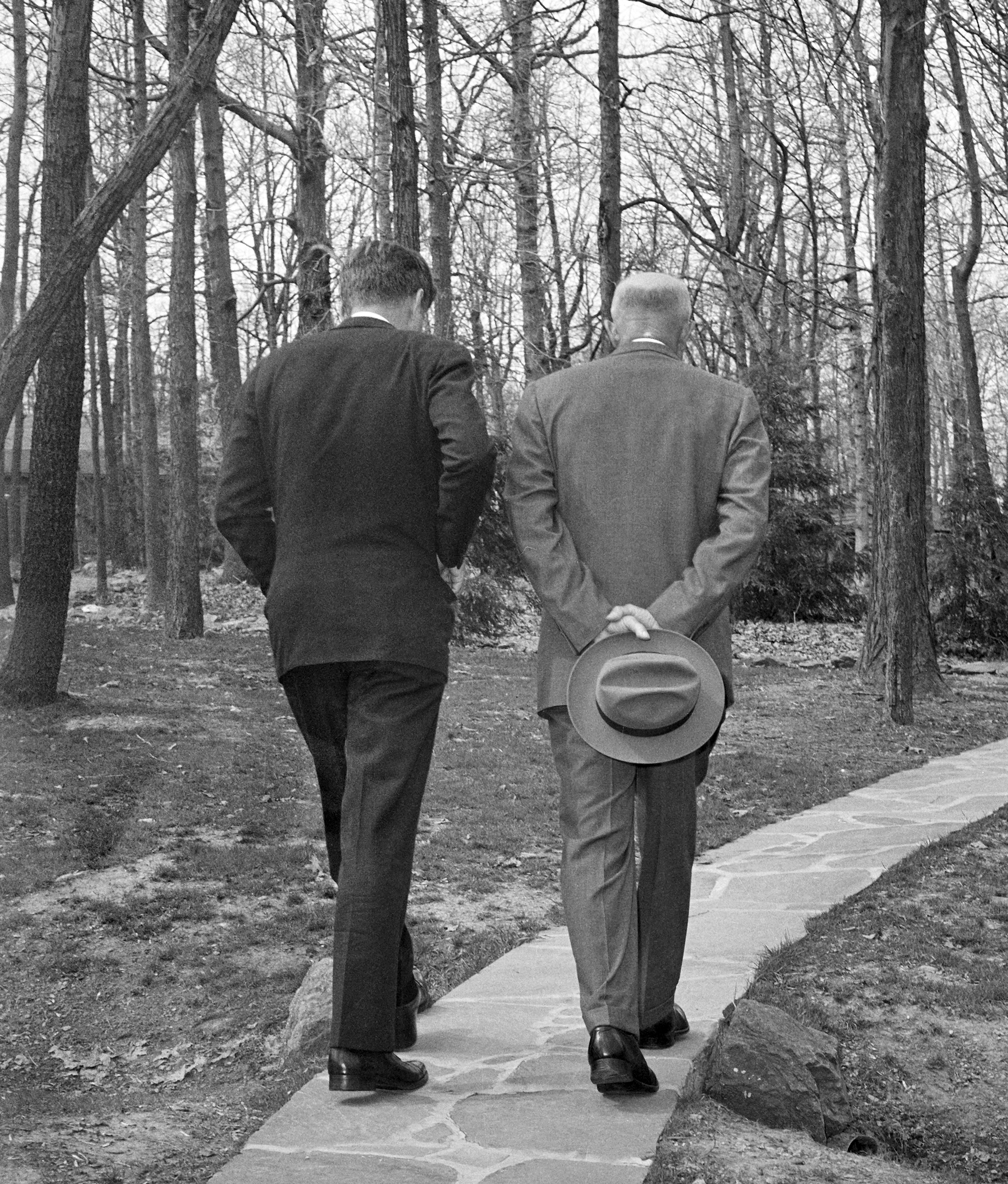
"Serious Steps", Vathis's Pulitzer Prize-winning photograph

He joined the AP in Philadelphia, in 1946; he spent most of his career at the Harrisburg, Pennsylvania bureau of the AP, starting in 1952.

In 1962, Vathis took a picture of President John F. Kennedy and former President Dwight D. Eisenhower walking together at Camp David. He attended Wilt Chamberlain's 100-point basketball game in 1962, which he had been attending with his son Randy, and captured a photograph of Chamberlain displaying a sign with number "100" written on it, which would later become a famous photograph in NBA history and one of the few known documentations of the game. In 1979, he helped cover the nation's worst nuclear power accident at Three Mile Island.

On January 22, 1987, Vathis covered then-Treasurer of Pennsylvania R. Budd Dwyer's expected resignation speech at the Finance Building at the Pennsylvania State Capitol Complex the day before Dwyer was to be sentenced for accepting a bribe after he was convicted of such a month prior Finance Building at the Pennsylvania State Capitol Complex Dwyer maintained his innocence of the crime and claimed he was a victim of political persecution. After a 30-minute speech, Dwyer handed out envelopes to his staffers before grabbing an envelope and producing a .357 Magnum revolver and shooting himself through his mouth, killing him instantly, in front of his staffers and the gathered press, including Vathis. Vathis captured a series of four photos of Dwyer, for which he was a finalist for the Pulitzer Prize for Breaking News Photography in 1988, and won third prize for in Spot News at the World Press Photo 1988 Photo Contest, which showed Dwyer holding the gun, Dwyer with the gun in his mouth, Dwyer falling after shooting himself, and Dwyer dead on the floor while his press secretary Duke Horshock attempts to calm the frightened crowd.

== Awards ==
- 1962 Pulitzer Prize for Photography
