= Memorial Lake State Park =

State park in Pennsylvania, United States

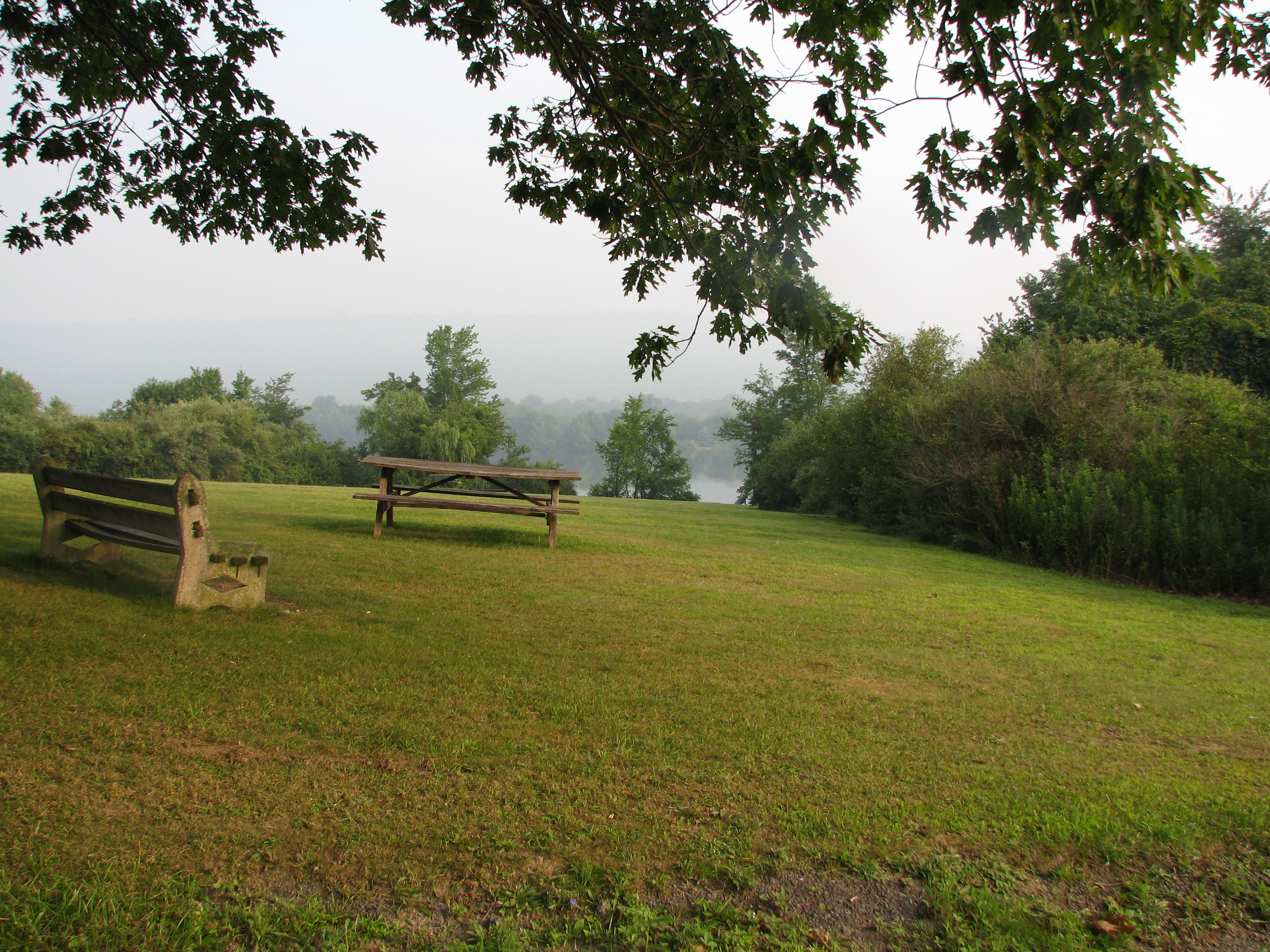

- Location within Pennsylvania Location within the United States
- Interactive map of Memorial Lake State Park
- Location: East Hanover Township, Lebanon County, Pennsylvania, United States
- Coordinates: 40°25′25″N 76°35′54″W
- Area: 230 acres (93 ha)
- Elevation: 433 feet (132 m)
- Established: 1945
- Administrator: Pennsylvania Department of Conservation and Natural Resources
- Website: Official website
- Pennsylvania State Parks

Memorial Lake State Park is a Pennsylvania state park on 230 acres (93 ha) in East Hanover Township, Lebanon County, Pennsylvania in the United States. The park is surrounded by Fort Indiantown Gap Military Reservation, headquarters of the Pennsylvania National Guard. It includes Memorial Lake, which is 85 acres (34 ha), and is a 30-minute drive from Harrisburg just off Exit 85 of Interstate 81.

Memorial Lake State Park was established in 1945 in memory and honor of Pennsylvania National Guard soldiers who served in World War I and World War II. Hiking, picnicking, cross-country skiing, and ice skating are some of the recreational activities available at the park.

Fishing and ice fishing are popular recreational activities at the park. The common game fish are largemouth bass, muskellunge, northern pike, yellow perch, white crappie, black crappie, bullhead, channel catfish, carp, sucker, trout, and various species of panfish. Memorial Lake is a warm water fishery. All rules and regulations of the Pennsylvania Fish and Boat Commission apply. There are two boat launches as well as boat rentals available.
