= Harold J. Lavell =

US Army major general (1925–2000)

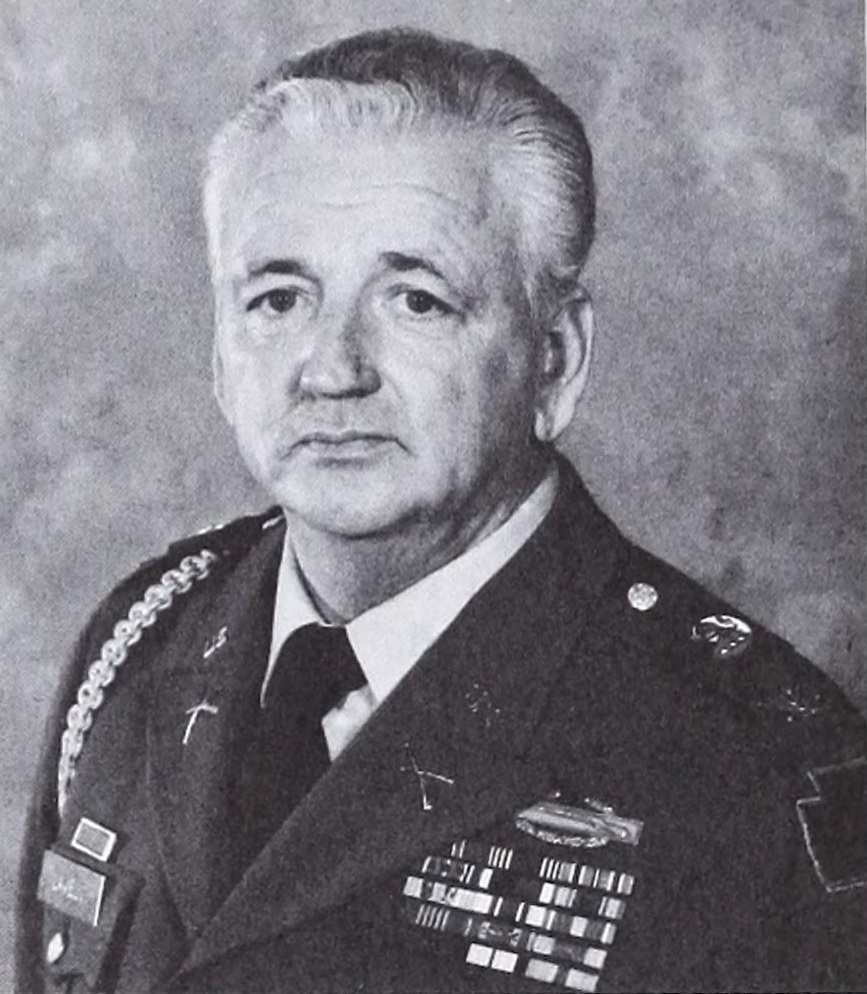
- Lavell as a major general in 1978
- Born: April 2, 1925; Rochester, New York, US
- Died: January 3, 2000 (aged 74); Annville, Pennsylvania, US
- Burial place: Indiantown Gap National Cemetery, Annville, Pennsylvania, US
- Education: United States Army War College; United States Army War College
- Spouse: Dolores Ridgway (m. 1949–2000)
- Children: 3
- Military career
- Service: United States Army; Pennsylvania National Guard
- Service years: 1943–1946 (Army); 1946–1985 (National Guard)
- Rank: Staff Sergeant (Army); Major General (National Guard); Lieutenant General (Retired list)
- Service number: 0959185
- Unit: Pennsylvania Army National Guard
- Commands: Company K, 3rd Battalion, 111th Infantry Regiment; 56th Brigade, 28th Infantry Division; 28th Infantry Division
- Wars: World War II; Allied-occupied Germany
- Awards: Army Distinguished Service Medal; Bronze Star Medal; Combat Infantryman Badge; Complete list

Harold Joseph Lavell (2 April 1925 – 3 January 2000) was a career officer in the United States Army. A veteran of World War II and the Korean War, he attained the rank of major general as commander of the 28th Infantry Division from 1980 to 1985. Lavell's awards and decorations included the Army Distinguished Service Medal, Bronze Star Medal, and Combat Infantryman Badge.

A native of Rochester, New York, Lavell was raised and educated in Media, Pennsylvania. He enlisted for service in World War II when he joined the U.S. Army in 1943. Assigned to the 69th Infantry Division, he served in combat in Europe and the post-war occupation of Germany. He was discharged in April 1946 with the rank of staff sergeant.

After brief service in the Enlisted Reserve Corps, in 1947 he joined the Pennsylvania Army National Guard. He was first sergeant of Company M, 3rd Battalion, 111th Infantry Regiment when he was commissioned as a second lieutenant in 1948. He subsequently commanded the regiment's Company K, and he later carried out staff assignments at the battalion and brigade level, typically as personnel officer (S-1) or operations officer (S-3), or as executive officer and second-in-command.

In 1974, Lavell was assigned to command the 56th Brigade, which he led until 1977, when he was promoted to brigadier general and assigned as assistant division commander of the 28th Infantry Division. In 1980, he was appointed to command of the division and promoted to major general. He remained in command until reaching the mandatory retirement age of 60 in 1985, after which he resided in Annville. He died in Annville on 3 January 2000 and was buried at Indiantown Gap National Cemetery.

== Early life ==
Harold Joseph Lavell (Note: According to the New York State Birth Index and the 1930 U.S. Census, Lavell's given name was Joseph Harold Lavell. By the time of the 1940 census, his names had been reversed.) was born in Rochester, New York on 2 April 1925, a son of Edward F. Lavell and Maude Patrick (Cavanaugh) Lavell. He was raised in Media, Pennsylvania, and was a 1943 graduate of Media High School.

In May 1943, Lavell entered the United States Army for World War II. He was assigned to first the 880th Field Artillery Battalion and later the 272nd Infantry Regiment, both units of the 69th Infantry Division. He served in combat in the European Theater of Operations and the post-war occupation of Germany. Lavell advanced from private to staff sergeant during the war and was discharged from active duty on 20 April 1946.

== Early career ==
After the Second World War, Lavell served in the Enlisted Reserve Corps. On 7 May 1947 he enlisted in Company M, 3rd Battalion, 111th Infantry Regiment, a unit of the Pennsylvania Army National Guard. He was assigned first as mortar platoon sergeant and later as the company first sergeant. Lavell served as a noncommissioned officer until receiving his commission as a second lieutenant of Infantry on 1 July 1948.

In the civilian sector, Lavell was employed as grocery store meat cutter and department manager in Brookhaven, Pennsylvania. In the early 1950s, he became a fulltime employee of the Pennsylvania National Guard, and he resided in Devon and Annville.

After becoming an officer, Lavell served as machine gun platoon leader, mortar platoon leader and reconnaissance platoon leader with Company M until he was transferred to command of the regiment's Company K on 15 December 1951. In April 1956, he was transferred to the staff of 3rd Battalion, 111th Infantry, where he served first as human resources staff officer (S-1) and later as executive officer.

== Continued career ==
On 1 January 1959, 3rd Battalion was organized 1st Battle Group, 111th Infantry; Lavell served on the group staff as assistant operations officer (S-3), liaison officer, and S-1. On 1 April 1963, his unit was redesignated Headquarters, 1st Brigade, 28th Infantry Division and he was assigned as S-1. In 1964, he graduated from the Infantry Officer Advanced Course. He was assigned as brigade executive officer in February 1966, and he continued to serve when the organization was redesignated 56th Brigade, 42nd Infantry Division in 1968 and 56th Brigade, 28th Infantry Division in 1975.

Lavell completed the United States Army Command and General Staff College course in 1966. In 1968, he graduated from the Military Police School’s Civil Disturbance Response Course. In 1970, Lavell completed the Recruiting and Retention School course at Fort Benjamin Harrison, Indiana. In January 1974, Lavell was appointed to command of the 56th Brigade, and he continued to serve until 1977. Lavell completed the U.S. Army Judge Advocate General School's Reserve Officer Legal Orientation Course in 1975. In 1977, he graduated from the United States Army War College.

Lavell graduated from the Combat Operations Course at the U.S. Air Force Air Ground Operations School in 1977. In June 1977, he was promoted to brigadier general and appointed assistant division commander of the 28th Infantry Division. In 1978, he completed the Senior Commanders Course for general officers. He continued to serve until 1980, when he was assigned as division commander and promoted to major general. Lavell commanded the division until 1985, when he reached the mandatory retirement age of 60 and was succeeded by Vernon E. James.

== Retirement ==
Lavell was a board of directors member for the Philadelphia area Society for Crippled Children and Adults and the Keystone State Games. He also served on the executive committee of the Pennsylvania National Guard Association. In addition, he was a member of the Military Order of the World Wars and the American Legion. He also served on the board of directors of the Paoli Memorial Hospital Association and was a member of the National Guard Association of the United States. Lavell was active in the Catholic church, the Catholic War Veterans, and the Knights of Columbus. He was also president of his local Rotary club and a Paul Harris fellow.

Lavell died in Anville on 3 January 2000. He was buried at Indiantown Gap National Cemetery in Annville.

== Awards ==
=== Federal awards ===
Lavell's federal awards included:

- Army Distinguished Service Medal
- Bronze Star Medal
- Army Good Conduct Medal
- Armed Forces Reserve Medal
- American Campaign Medal
- European-African-Middle Eastern Campaign Medal
- World War II Victory Medal
- Army of Occupation of Germany Medal
- Combat Infantryman Badge

=== State awards ===
Among his state awards were:

- Pennsylvania Distinguished Service Medal
- Pennsylvania Meritorious Service Medal
- Pennsylvania Commendation Ribbon
- General Thomas J. Stewart Medal
- Pennsylvania 20 Year Medal
- New York State Military Commendation Medal

=== Additional ===
Lavell was a recipient of the Medal of Freedom from the Chapel of the Four Chaplains.

== Dates of rank ==
Lavell's dates of rank were:

- Private to First Sergeant, 10 May 1943 to 30 June 1948
- Second Lieutenant, 1 July 1948
- First Lieutenant, 8 August 1950
- Captain, 31 May 1960
- Major, 21 December 1962
- Lieutenant Colonel, 7 April 1966
- Colonel, 28 August 1974
- Brigadier General, 2 February 1978
- Major General, 1 August 1980
- Major General (Retired), 30 April 1980
- Lieutenant General (Retired list), 30 April 1980
