= Ralphton, Pennsylvania =

Unincorporated community in Pennsylvania, US

Ralphton
- Unincorporated community
- Location within the state of Pennsylvania Ralphton (the United States)
- Coordinates: 40°6′49″N 79°1′13″W
- Country: United States
- State: Pennsylvania
- County: Somerset
- Elevation: 2,014 ft (614 m)
- Time zone: UTC-5 (Eastern (EST))
  - Summer (DST): UTC-4 (EDT)
- GNIS feature ID: 1184614

Ralphton is an unincorporated community and coal town in Somerset County, Pennsylvania, United States. Quemahoning Coal Company operated at least 10 mines in Ralphton in 1918.

== Notable people ==
- Henry K. Fluck, US Army major general, born in Ralphton
