= 1962 Pulitzer Prize =

Awards for journalism and related fields

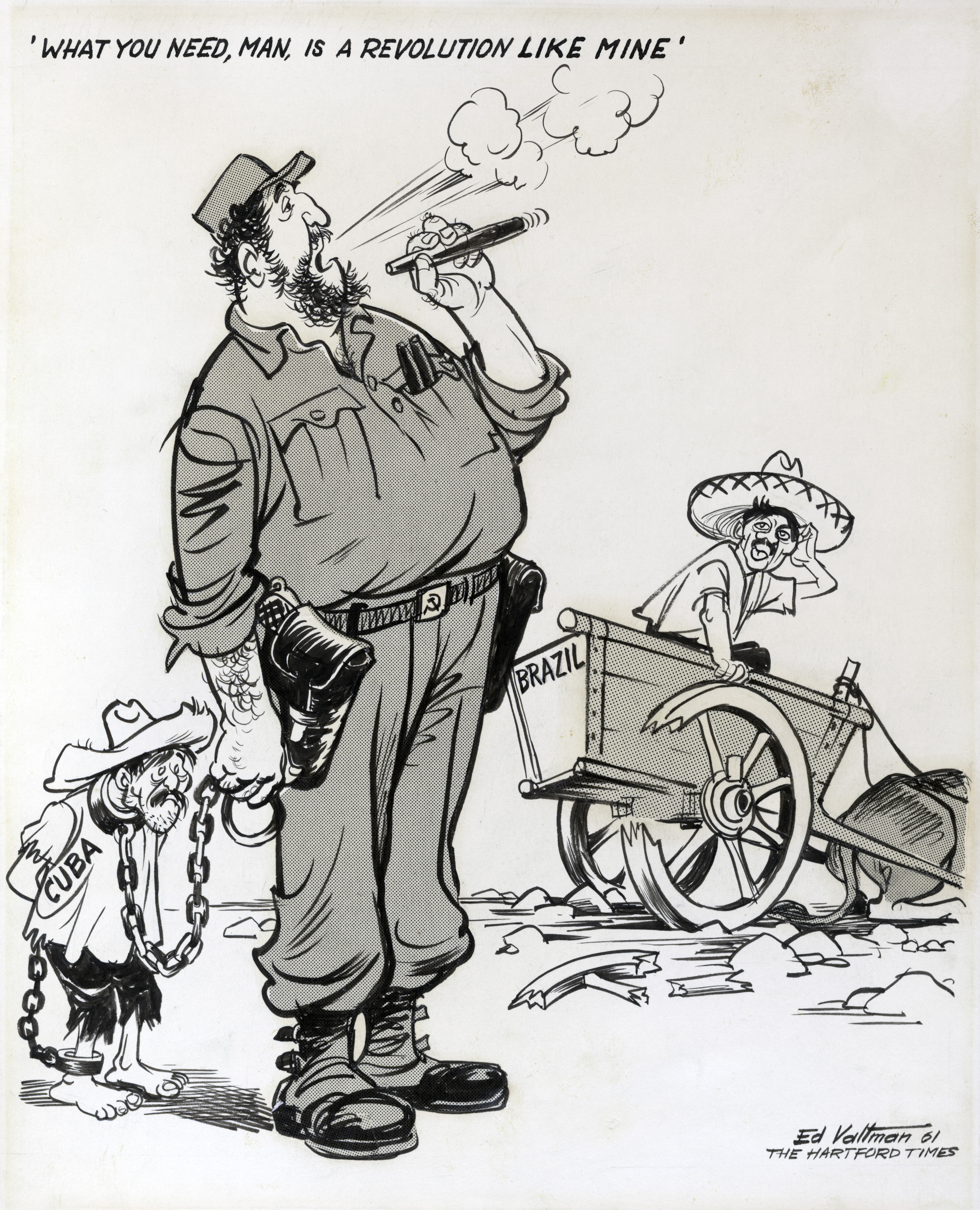
The prize-winning cartoon, "What You Need, Man, Is a Revolution Like Mine"

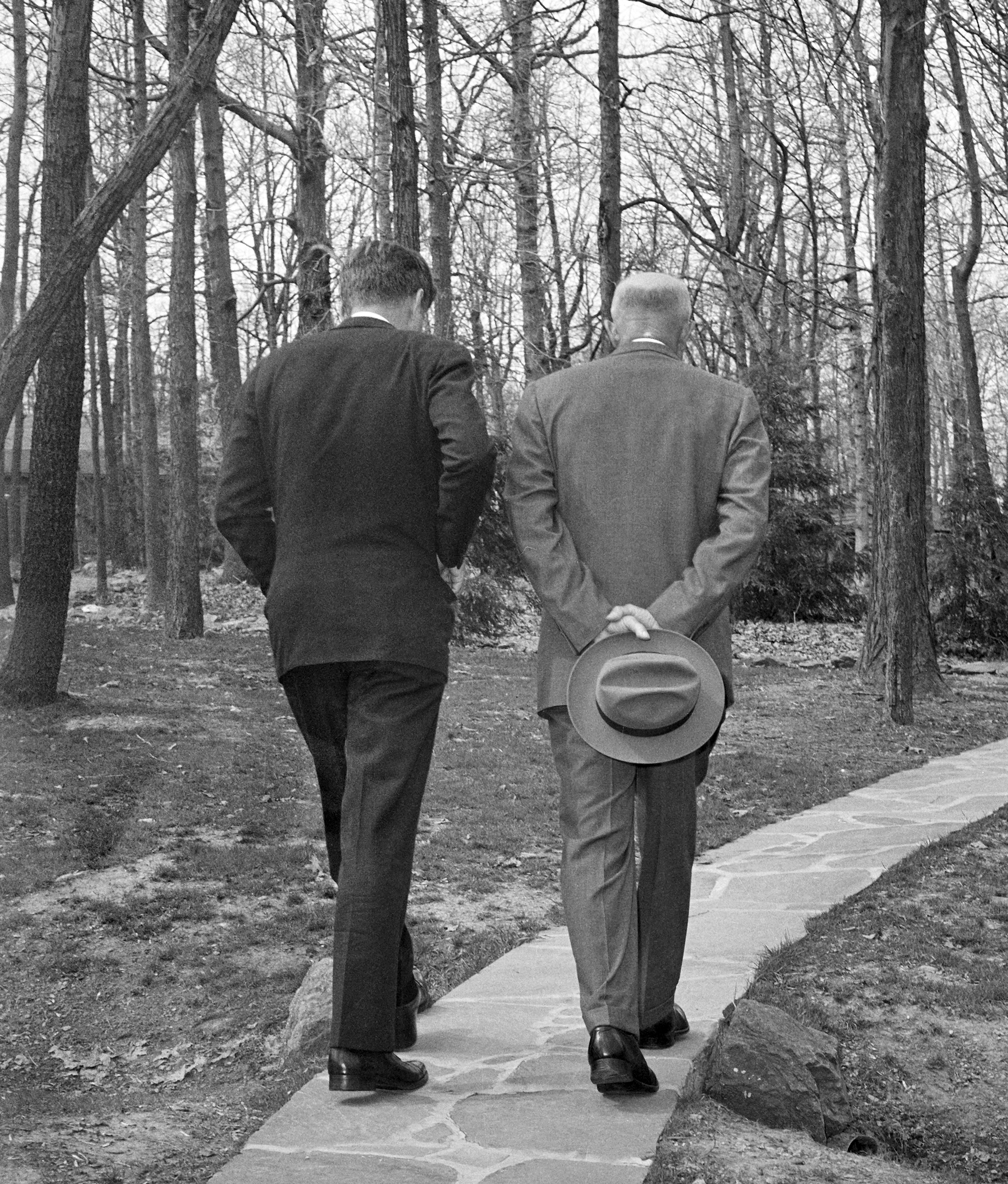
The prize-winning photograph, "Serious Steps"

The following are the Pulitzer Prizes for 1962.

== Journalism awards ==
- Public Service:
  - The Panama City News-Herald, for its three-year campaign against entrenched power and corruption, with resultant reforms in Panama City, Florida, and Bay County, Florida.
- Local Reporting, Edition Time:
  - Robert D. Mullins of the Deseret News (Salt Lake City) for his resourceful coverage of a murder and kidnapping at Dead Horse Point, Utah.
- Local Reporting, No Edition Time:
  - George Bliss of the Chicago Tribune, for his initiative in uncovering scandals in the Metropolitan Sanitary District of Greater Chicago, with resultant remedial action.
- National Reporting:
  - Nathan G. Caldwell and Gene S. Graham of the Nashville Tennessean, for their exclusive disclosure and six years of detailed reporting, under great difficulties, of the undercover cooperation between management interests in the coal industry and the United Mine Workers.
- International Reporting:
  - Walter Lippmann of the New York Herald Tribune Syndicate, for his 1961 interview with Soviet Premier Khrushchev, as illustrative of Lippmann's long and distinguished contribution to American journalism.
- Editorial Writing:
  - Thomas M. Storke of the Santa Barbara News-Press, for his forceful editorials calling public attention to the activities of a semi-secret organization known as the John Birch Society.
- Editorial Cartooning:
  - Edmund S. Valtman of the Hartford Times, for "What You Need, Man, Is a Revolution Like Mine", published on August 31, 1961.
- Photography:
  - Paul Vathis of the Harrisburg, Pennsylvania, bureau of the Associated Press, for the photograph, "Serious Steps", published April 22, 1961.

== Letters, drama and music awards ==
- Fiction:
  - The Edge of Sadness by Edwin O'Connor (Little).
- Drama:
  - How to Succeed in Business Without Really Trying by Frank Loesser and Abe Burrows.
- History:
  - The Triumphant Empire: Thunder-Clouds Gather in the West 1763-1766 by Lawrence H. Gipson (Alfred A. Knopf).
- Biography or Autobiography:
  - No award given. The advisory board selected Citizen Hearst by W. A. Swanberg, but the trustees of Columbia University vetoed this selection.
- Poetry:
  - Poems by Alan Dugan (Yale Univ. Press).
- General Nonfiction:
  - The Making of the President 1960 by Theodore White (Atheneum).
- Music:
  - The Crucible, an opera in three acts by Robert Ward; libretto by Bernard Stambler, based on the play by Arthur Miller. First performed at New York City Center, on October 26, 1961, by the New York City Opera Company.
