= Ono, Pennsylvania =

Unincorporated community in Pennsylvania, U.S.

Coordinates: 40°24′10″N 76°32′05″W

Ono is an unincorporated community in East Hanover Township, Lebanon County, Pennsylvania, United States, on U.S. Route 22 and approximately two miles southwest of the junction of Interstate 78 and Interstate 81. The Swatara Creek to the south drains into the Susquehanna River. While Ono has its own post office, with the zip code of 17077, some residents are served by the Annville or Jonestown post office, with the zip codes of 17003 or 17038, respectively.

== Etymology ==
There are a few theories on the naming of the community. According to one tradition, the name Ono was selected after all other ideas were rejected by a town elder with "O! No." Another likely scenario is that the community was named after the biblical Plain of Ono, likely drawing inspiration from the many fields surrounding the community.
