= Blue Eyed Six =

Group of six blue-eyed men indicted on murder charges in 1879

The Blue Eyed Six were a group of six men, all of them coincidentally blue-eyed, who were arrested and indicted on first degree murder charges in Lebanon County, Pennsylvania, in 1879.

The Six were Charles Drews, Frank Stichler, Henry F. Wise, Josiah Hummel, Israel Brandt, and George Zechman. This group of friends and unsavory business associates conspired to murder their neighbor, Joseph Raber, for an insurance pay-off. Raber, age 65, lived in poverty with his housekeeper in a charcoal burner's hut in the Blue Mountain area of northern Lebanon County. Raber had no steady employment and depended mainly on the charity of his equally impoverished neighbors.

In early July 1878, four of the conspirators met at Brandt's hotel at St. Joseph Spring and agreed to insure Raber for a total of $8,000. The men told the insurance agent that they had agreed to take care of Raber for the rest of his life and wanted the policy to cover his eventual burial expenses. Several assessment-type life insurance policies were sold on Joseph Raber, with his cooperation, with the men named as the beneficiaries.

Later that year they enlisted two other men to drown Raber in Indiantown Creek. Without any evidence to the contrary, the coroner ruled the death accidental. Although the local citizenry suspected foul play, it wasn't until two months later, when Drews' son-in-law Joseph Peters reported to the constable that he was an eye-witness to the murder, that the six men were arrested and held over for trial.

== Trial ==
In a highly unusual move, the Six were tried together. This irregularity in addition to attention from local newspapers may have contributed to the trial's popularity. Reporters from throughout the east coast descended on the city of Lebanon, the county seat of Lebanon County, and the story was carried worldwide. The trial began on 18 April. The Commonwealth's main witness was Drews' son-in-law, but he was only one of thirty-six witnesses called by the prosecution.

The defense called twenty-two witnesses. The witnesses on both sides were mainly friends, neighbors, and family members who contradicted each other at every turn. It became evident that there were many people who knew of, or suspected, the plot before and after Raber's death, but who did not come forward for fear of mortal retaliation. At 3:30 p.m. on 24 April 1879, the fate of the Blue Eyed Six was left in the hands of the twelve men of the jury.

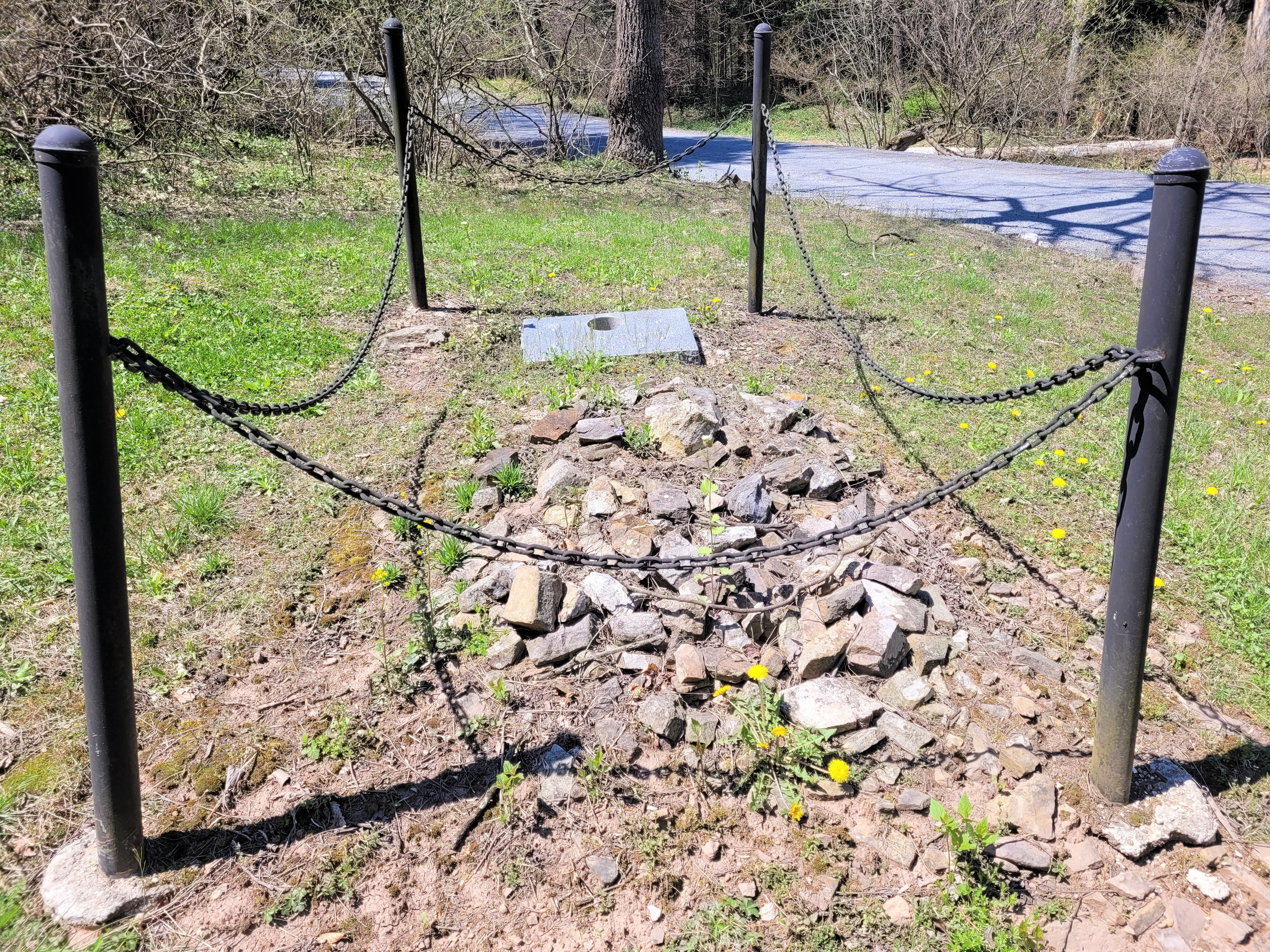
Franklin Stichler's grave along McLean Road at Fort Indiantown Gap, Pa.

The wait was not long. Five hours later the courthouse bell rang out, announcing that they had reached their verdicts. The jury returned verdicts of guilty of first degree murder for all six of the defendants. Defense requested that the jury be polled, and so the word "Guilty" was uttered seventy-two times, once for each defendant from each juror.

The local newspaper noted that it was the first time in the recorded history of common law of the United States and England that six people were convicted of murder on a single indictment. On appeal, the judge awarded Zechman a new trial, based on the lack of direct evidence presented by the Commonwealth against him personally. He was acquitted in his second trial on essentially the same evidence. The other five defendants were sentenced to death by hanging.

Drews and Stichler, who had committed the crime, were hanged first. After all other appeals were exhausted, the accomplices Wise, Hummel, and Brandt were hanged the following year. The acquitted Zechman died of natural causes within the decade. Apart from the actual murder trial, the whole proceeding turned out to be an indictment of the murky business of assessment life insurance, which led to major changes in insurance law, particularly with regard to the practice of insuring people in whom one had no legal interest.

== Misconceptions ==
The Blue Eyed Six are sometimes reported to have been hanged and to be buried in the cemetery at Moonshine United Zion Church (Moonshine is the name of the family who donated the land the church and cemetery occupy) near the village of Green Point at Indiantown Gap, near the site of the murder. In actuality, the hangings all took place at the county prison in Lebanon. Although Joseph Raber, the victim, is buried at Moonshine Church, the six conspirators were all buried separately by their families elsewhere in the county.

Brandt and Drews are buried side by side in the veteran's section of Mt. Lebanon Cemetery in Lebanon. Hummel and Zechman are buried at Sattazahn Lutheran Church cemetery in Union Township, Lebanon County. Wise is buried at Evangelical United Brethren Church cemetery in the village of Green Point, Union Township, Lebanon County. Stichler is buried in the family plot on McLean Road, now within the bounds of Ft. Indiantown Gap.

Hummel was hanged May 13, 1880, along with Wise and Brandt. Zechman was acquitted and therefore escaped hanging. He was released from prison and died in 1887.

== Blue Eyed Six in popular culture ==
- Sir Arthur Conan Doyle was inspired by the Blue Eyed Six moniker for his Sherlock Holmes short story, "The Red-Headed League" The story alludes to the matter through the criminals' use of a made-up millionaire from Lebanon, Pennsylvania.
- The story of the Blue Eyed Six is recounted in a stage play, which plays locally in Pennsylvania, and in a documentary film of the same name, by Bruce and Brian Kreider.
- Author/novelist Gary Ludwig speaks to groups about the infamous Lebanon County 19th century murder. Ludwig's four-part magazine series about the murder was published in 1979. The magazine articles were subsequently published in booklet form.
