= East Hanover Township, Lebanon County, Pennsylvania =

Township in Pennsylvania, US

Coordinates: 40°26′00″N 76°37′59″W

- Township
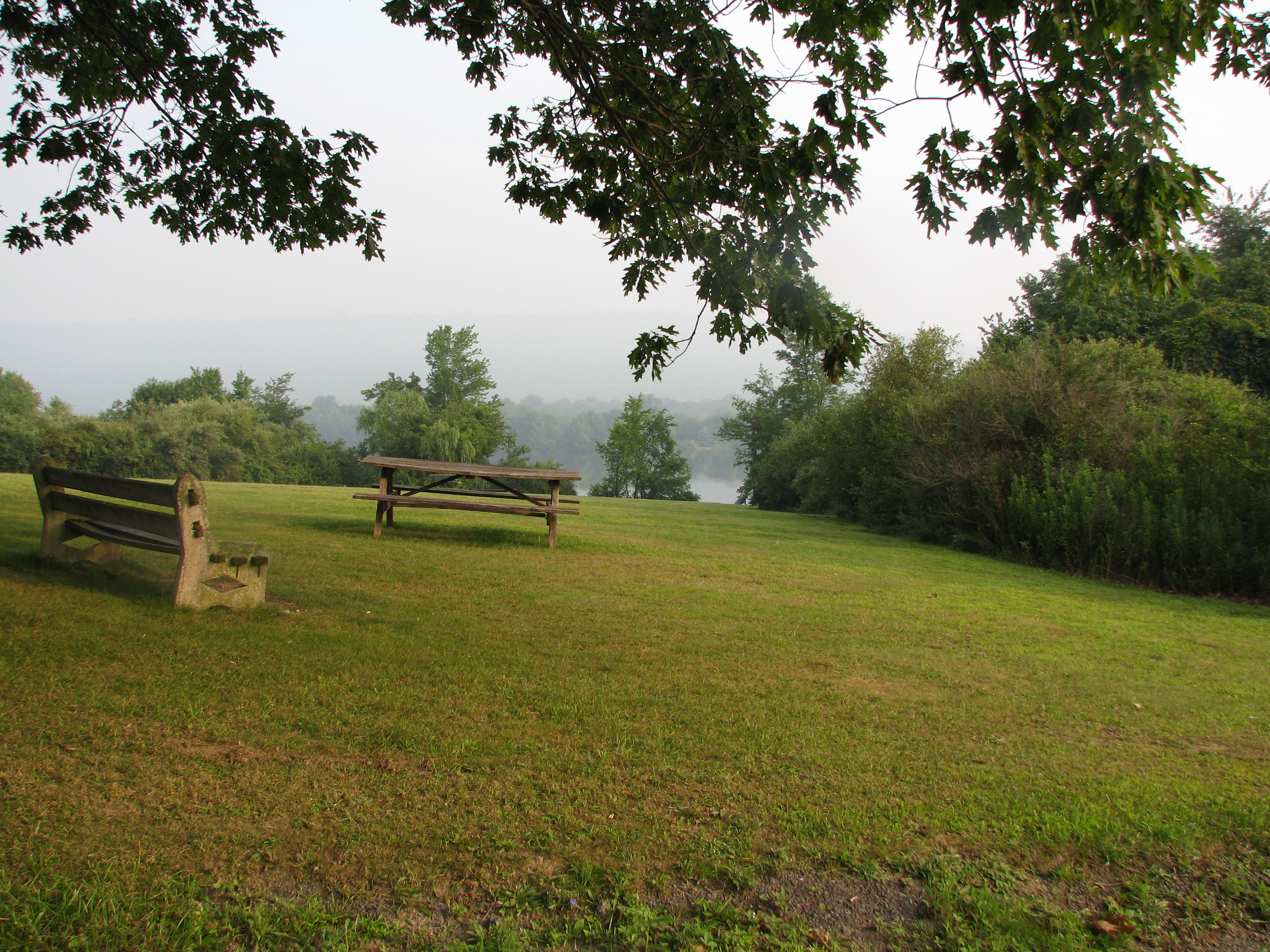
- Memorial Lake State Park is in East Hanover Township.

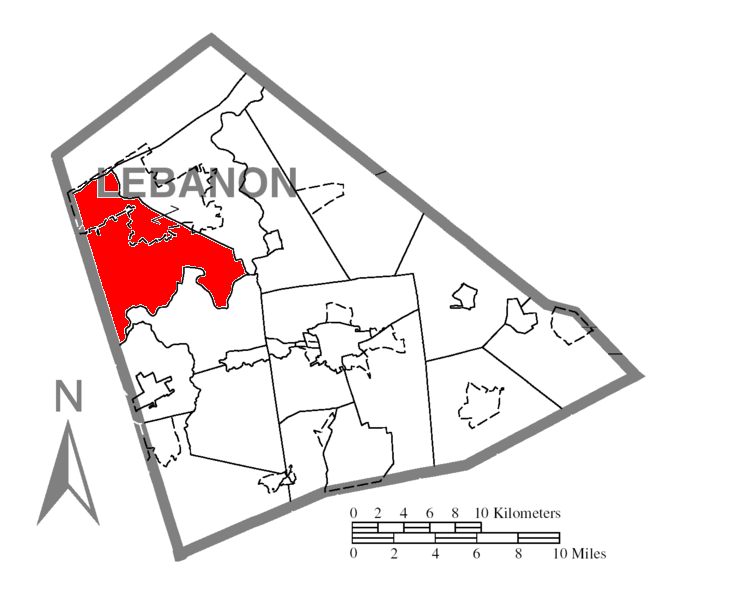
- Location in Lebanon County, Pennsylvania

- Location of Lebanon County in Pennsylvania
- Country: United States
- State: Pennsylvania
- County: Lebanon
- Incorporated: 1785

Area
  - Total: 32.63 sq mi (84.51 km^{2})
  - Land: 32.46 sq mi (84.07 km^{2})
  - Water: 0.17 sq mi (0.44 km^{2})

Population (2020)
  - Total: 2,658
  - Estimate (2021): 2,653
  - Density: 81.9/sq mi (31.62/km^{2})
- Time zone: UTC-5 (Eastern (EST))
  - Summer (DST): UTC-4 (EDT)
- Area code: 717
- FIPS code: 42-075-21224
- Website: easthanovertwp.com

Historical population
Census	Pop.	Note	%±
2000	2,858		—
2010	2,801		−2.0%
2020	2,658		−5.1%
2021 (est.)	2,653		−0.2%
U.S. Decennial Census

East Hanover Township is a township in Lebanon County, Pennsylvania, United States. The population was 2,658 at the 2020 census. It is part of the Lebanon, PA Metropolitan Statistical Area.

== History ==
When Lebanon County was formed in 1813, East Hanover Township of Dauphin County was partitioned to form East Hanover Township of Lebanon County.

== Geography ==
According to the United States Census Bureau, the township has a total area of 32.6 square miles (84 km^{2}), of which 32.5 square miles (84 km^{2}) is land and 0.17 square miles (0.44 km^{2}) (0.52%) is water. Half of Fort Indiantown Gap is in the northern part of the township. The unincorporated community of Harper Tavern is in the center of the township, and Ono is in the southeast.

== Demographics ==
As of the census of 2000, there were 2,858 people, 1,034 households, and 771 families residing in the township. The population density was 87.6 inhabitants per square mile (33.8/km^{2}). There were 1,091 housing units at an average density of 33.4 per square mile (12.9/km^{2}). The racial makeup of the township was 96.82% White, 0.63% African American, 0.24% Native American, 0.52% Asian, 0.03% Pacific Islander, 0.84% from other races, and 0.91% from two or more races. Hispanic or Latino of any race were 2.24% of the population.

There were 1,034 households, out of which 30.1% had children under the age of 18 living with them, 64.2% were married couples living together, 5.7% had a female householder with no husband present, and 25.4% were non-families. 20.2% of all households were made up of individuals, and 5.8% had someone living alone who was 65 years of age or older. The average household size was 2.63 and the average family size was 3.03.

In the township the population was spread out, with 22.2% under the age of 18, 10.8% from 18 to 24, 28.8% from 25 to 44, 26.5% from 45 to 64, and 11.7% who were 65 years of age or older. The median age was 38 years. For every 100 females, there were 103.1 males. For every 100 females age 18 and over, there were 103.9 males.

The median income for a household in the township was $50,579, and the median income for a family was $55,091. Males had a median income of $35,547 versus $24,327 for females. The per capita income for the township was $22,108. About 3.1% of families and 5.5% of the population were below the poverty line, including 7.2% of those under age 18 and 7.3% of those age 65 or over.
