= 289th Infantry Regiment =

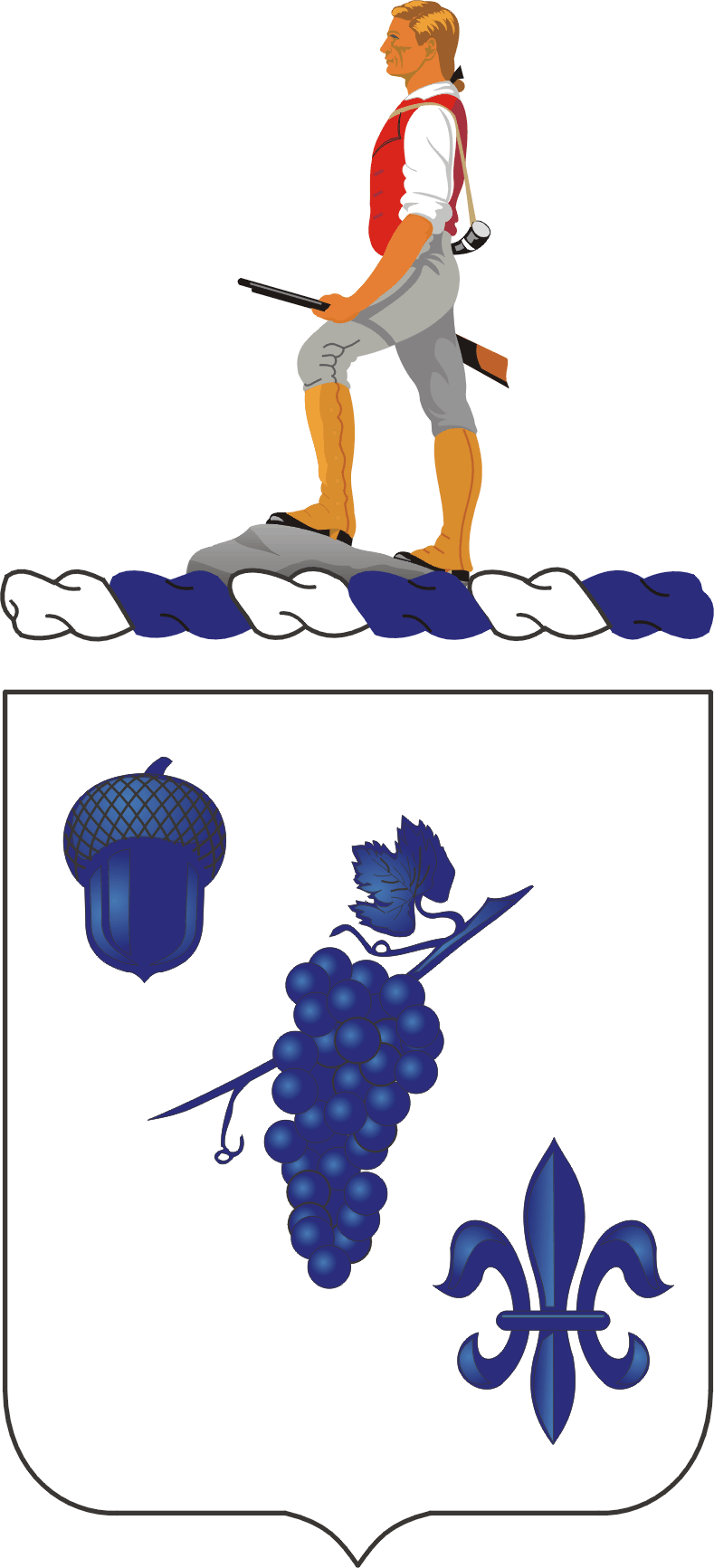
- Coat of arms
- Active: 1942-1945; 1952-1955; 1993-
- Country: United States
- Branch: United States Army Reserve
- Type: Infantry
- Size: Regiment
- Motto: "Vincere Aut Mori" (To Conquer or To Die)

Insignia
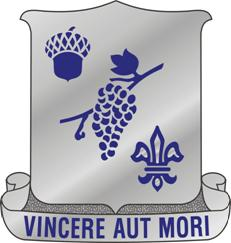
- Distinctive unit insignia

The 289th Infantry Regiment is an infantry regiment in the U.S. Army Reserve.

== History ==
The regiment was activated on 15 April 1943 at Fort Leonard Wood, Missouri.

The regiment was sent to the European in 1944 and participated in the Rhineland, Ardennes-Alsace and Central Europe campaigns.

It was inactivated on 23 November 1945 at Camp Patrick Henry, Virginia.

The regiment was allocated to the Organized Reserve Corps and re-activated on 1 March 1952 and its headquarters located at Beaumont, Texas. The Organized Reserve Corps was re-designated on 9 July 1952 as the Army Reserve.

The location of headquarters changed 25 May 1954 to College Station, Texas.

The regiment was inactivated on 31 January 1955 at College Station, Texas, and relieved from assignment to the 75th Infantry Division the same date.

== Lineage ==
Constituted 24 December 1942 in the Army of the United States as the 289th Infantry and assigned to the 75th Infantry Division (United States)

- Activated 15 April 1943 at Fort Leonard Wood, Missouri
- Inactivated 23 November 1945 at Camp Patrick Henry, Virginia
- Allotted 21 February 1952 to the Organized Reserve Corps
- Activated 1 March 1952 with headquarters at Beaumont, Texas
- (Organized Reserve Corps redesignated 9 July 1952 as the Army Reserve)
- (Location of headquarters changed 25 May 1954 to College Station, Texas).

Inactivated 31 January 1955 at College Station, Texas, and relieved from assignment to the 75th Infantry Division

- Redesignated 1 October 1993 as the 289th Regiment and reorganized to consist of the 1st, 2d, and 3d Battalions, elements of the 75th Division (Exercise)
- Reorganized 17 October 1999 to consist of the 1st, 2d, and 3d Battalions, elements of the 75th Division (Training Support); 2d Battalion concurrently allotted to the Regular Army
- Elements ordered into active military service in support of the War on Terrorism
- Relieved 1 May 2007 from assignment to the 75th Division (Training Support)

== Distinctive unit insignia ==
- Description

A Silver color metal and enamel device 1 1/8 inches (2.9 cm) in height overall, consisting of a shield blazoned: Argent, a bunch of grapes stalked and leaved between in bend an acorn and a fleur-de-lis Azure. Attached below the shield a Silver scroll inscribed "VINCERE AUT MORI" in Blue. The translation of the motto is "To Conquer or To Die."

- Symbolism

Blue and white are colors traditionally associated with Infantry. The grapes refer to service in the Rhineland; the acorn is for the forests of Ardennes; and the fleur-de-lis for Central Europe; all symbolic of the unit's service in World War II.

- Background

The distinctive unit insignia was originally approved for the 289th Infantry Regiment on 19 June 1952. It was redesignated for the 289th Regiment, with description and symbolism revised, on 28 October 1993.

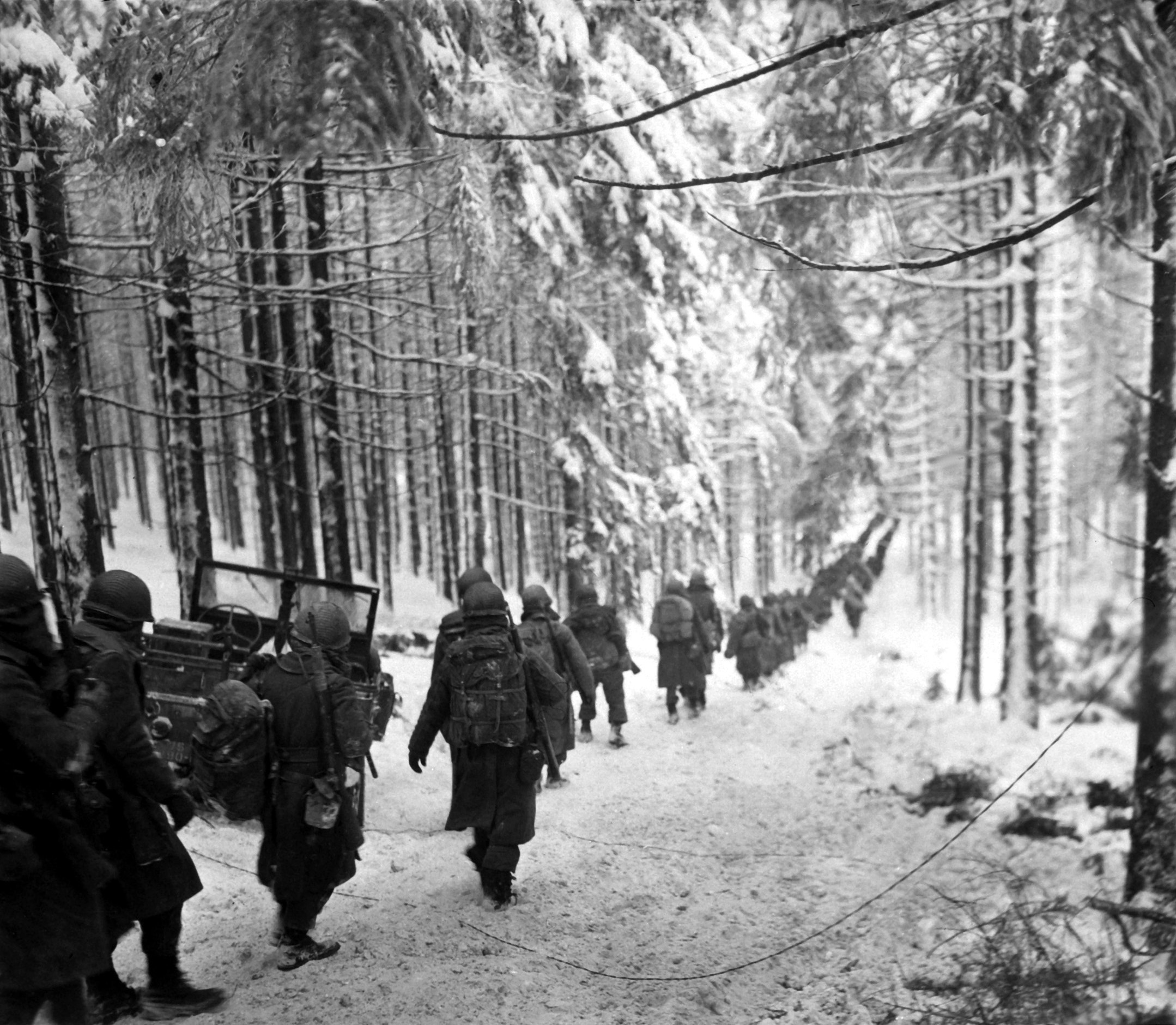
Soldiers of the 289th Infantry march along the snow-covered road on their way to cut off the Saint Vith-Houffalize road in Belgium on 24 January 1945

== Coat of arms ==
- Blazon
  - Shield: Argent, a bunch of grapes stalked and leaved between in bend an acorn and a fleur-de-lis Azure.
  - Crest: That for the regiments and separate battalions of the Army Reserve: From a wreath Argent and Azure, the Lexington Minute Man Proper. The statue of the Minute Man, Captain John Parker (H.H. Kitson, sculptor), stands on the Common in Lexington, Massachusetts.
  - Motto VINCERE AUT MORI (To Conquer or To Die).
- Symbolism
  - Shield: Blue and white are colors traditionally associated with Infantry. The grapes refer to service in the Rhineland; the acorn is for the forests of Ardennes; and the fleur-de-lis for Central Europe; all symbolic of the unit's service in World War II.
  - Crest: The crest is that of the U.S. Army Reserve.
- Background: The coat of arms was originally approved for the 289th Infantry Regiment on 19 June 1952. It was redesignated for the 289th Regiment, with blazon and symbolism revised, on 28 October 1993.

== Campaign streamers ==
World War II

- Rhineland
- Ardennes-Alsace
- Central Europe

== Decorations ==
2d Battalion entitled to:

- Army Superior Unit Award, Streamer embroidered 2001-2004

3d Battalion entitled to:

- Army Superior Unit Award, Streamer embroidered 2003
