= Randall R. Marchi =

US Army major general (born 1954)

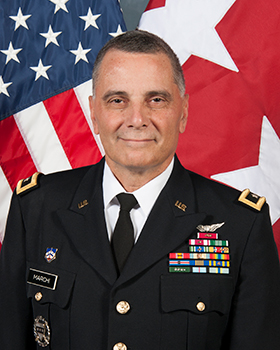
- March in 2012
- Born: April 1954 (age 72); Mechanicsburg, Pennsylvania
- Alma mater: Indiana University of Pennsylvania; United States Army Command and General Staff College; United States Army War College
- Spouse: Margaret Walker Stine (m. 1978)
- Children: 3
- Military career
- Service: United States Army
- Service years: 1973–2014
- Rank: Major General
- Unit: Pennsylvania Army National Guard
- Commands: Battery F, 109th Field Artillery Regiment; 1st Battalion, 108th Field Artillery Regiment; 28th Infantry Division Artillery; 28th Infantry Division
- Awards: Legion of Merit (3); Meritorious Service Medal (2); Army Commendation Medal
- Other work: Director, Bureau of State and Federal Audits, Pennsylvania Auditor General

Randall R. Marchi (born April 1954) is a retired United States Army officer. A career member of the Pennsylvania Army National Guard, Marchi served from 1973 until 2014 and attained the rank of major general. After attaining general officer rank in 2007, Marchi served as the Pennsylvania National Guard's assistant adjutant general for army, commander of the 28th Infantry Division, and Pennsylvania's deputy adjutant general. His awards included three awards of the Legion of Merit, two awards of the Meritorious Service Medal, and the Army Commendation Medal.

A native of Mechanicsburg, Pennsylvania, Marchi was a 1972 graduate of Cumberland Valley High School. He was a 1976 graduate of Harrisburg Area Community College, and in 1978 he received his Bachelor of Arts degree in criminology from Indiana University of Pennsylvania. Marchi was an employee of the Pennsylvania Auditor General and became director of the auditor general's Bureau of State and Federal Audits. His professional qualifications included certified public accountant, certified fraud examiner, and certified government financial manager.

Marchi enlisted in the Pennsylvania Army National Guard in 1973 and graduated from officer candidate school in 1980. A Field Artillery officer, Marchi advanced through the ranks in staff and command assignments, and his commands included: Battery F, 109th Field Artillery Regiment; 1st Battalion, 108th Field Artillery Regiment; and the 28th Infantry Division Artillery. In 2007, Marchi was promoted to brigadier general and appointed as Pennsylvania's assistant adjutant general for army. In 2009, he received promotion to major general and was assigned to command of the 28th Infantry Division. In 2012, he was named Pennsylvania's deputy adjutant general, and he served in this post until retiring in 2014.

== Early life ==
Randall Raymond Marchi was born in Mechanicsburg, Pennsylvania in April 1954, a son of Ranieri "Randy" Marchi and Constance (Palmieri) Marchi. He was raised and educated in Mechanicsburg and graduated from Cumberland Valley High School in 1972. He graduated from Harrisburg Area Community College in 1976, then attended Indiana University of Pennsylvania, from which he graduated in 1978 with a BA in criminology.

Marchi is a certified public accountant, certified fraud examiner, and certified government financial manager. He was employed by the Pennsylvania Auditor General served as director of the auditor general's Bureau of State and Federal Audits. Marchi is a member of the American Institute of Certified Public Accountants, Association of Government Accountants, and Association of Certified Fraud Examiners. Marchi is also active in Freemasonry and is a member of Eureka Masonic West Shore Lodge No. 302 and the National Sojourners.

== Start of career ==
Marchi enlisted in the Pennsylvania Army National Guard in 1973. He was promoted to specialist 4 in 1976, and graduated from officer candidate school in May 1980. After receiving his commission as a second lieutenant of Field Artillery, Marchi was assigned as an air observer with the 28th Infantry Division Artillery.

From November 1985 to March 1987, Marchi was survey platoon commander with the 28th Infantry Division Artillery. He was then assigned to command of Battery F, 109th Field Artillery Regiment, where he served until July 1991. Marchi was a target analyst on the staff of the 28th Infantry Division Artillery from July 1991 to January 1994. From January 1994 to February 1997, he served as fire support officer with the 28th Infantry Division Artillery.

=== Military education ===
Professional education Marchi completed during his career included:

- Field Artillery Officer Basic Course
- Field Artillery Officer Advanced Course
- United States Army Command and General Staff College
- United States Army War College (master of strategic studies degree, 2004)
- Reserve Component General Officer Legal Orientation Course
- Dual Status Command Course

== Continued career ==
Marchi was assistant fire support coordinator on the staff of the 28th Infantry Division Artillery from February to December 1997. He was then assigned as executive officer of 1st Battalion, 108th Field Artillery Regiment, where he served until December 1999. From September 1999 to July 2000, Marchi was a personnel staff officer at the Headquarters of Pennsylvania's State Area Command.

From July 2000 to August 2003, Marchi commanded 1st Battalion, 108th Field Artillery. From August to October 2003, he was assigned as the 28th Infantry Division Artillery's plans, operations, and training staff officer (S-3), and he was assigned as the organization's executive officer from October 2003 to June 2004. From June 2004 to April 2006, Marchi was commander of the 28th Infantry Division Artillery.

=== Professional association memberships ===
Among Marchi's professional memberships were:

- 28th Infantry Division Association
- Army War College Foundation
- National Guard Association of the United States
- Pennsylvania National Guard Association
- United States Field Artillery Association
- Association of the United States Army
- American Legion

== Later career ==
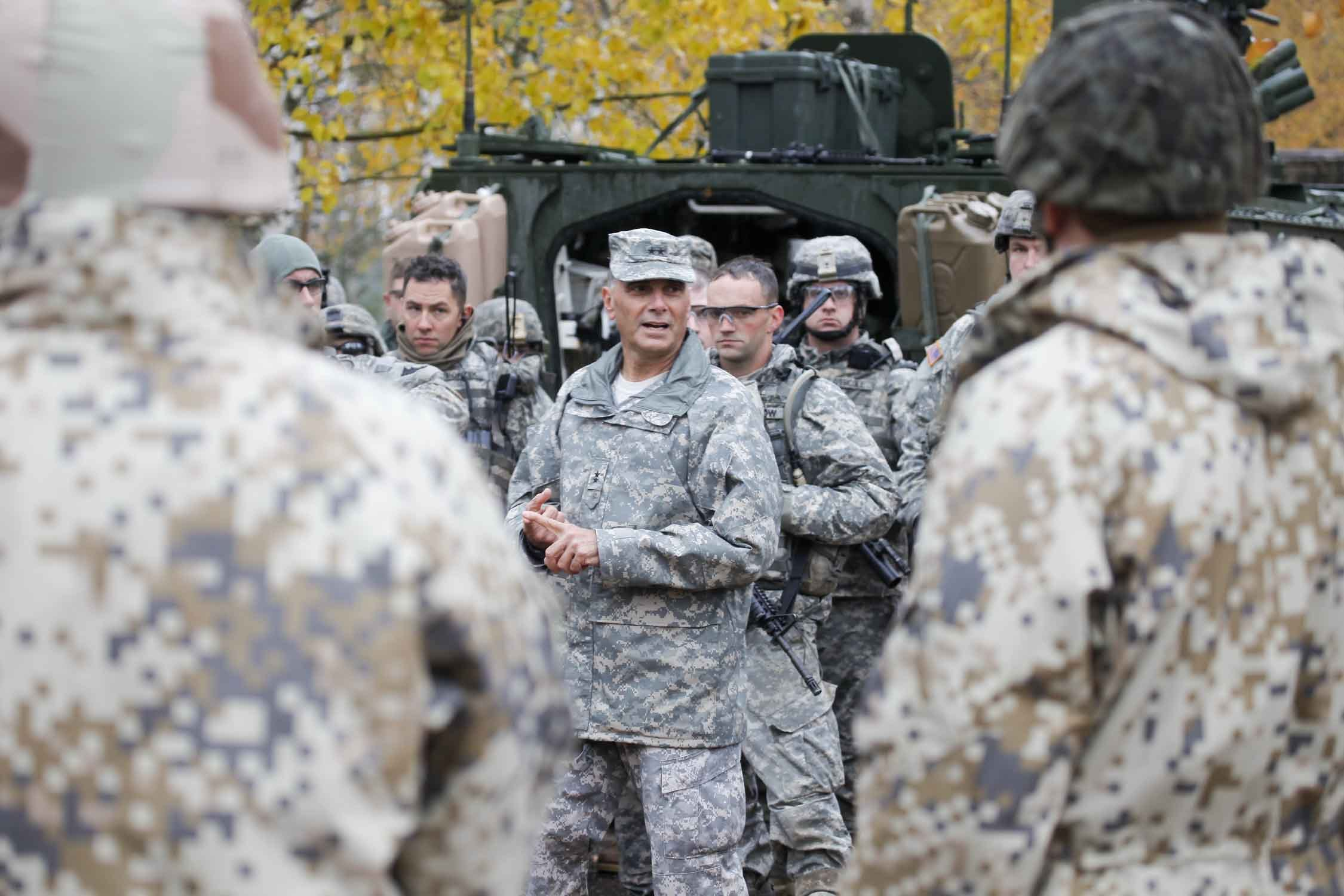
Marchi addresses Pennsylvania soldiers in Latvia during Saber Strike 11

From April 2006 to April 2007, Marchi was director of the joint staff at Pennsylvania's Joint Force Headquarters. In April 2007, Marchi was promoted to brigadier general. From April 2007 to June 2009, he was assigned as Pennsylvania's assistant adjutant general for army.

In June 2009, Marchi was assigned as commander of the 28th Infantry Division, and he was promoted to major general in July. He remained in command of the division until September 2012. From September 2012 until his May 2014 retirement, Marchi was against assigned as assistant adjutant general for army, and performed duty as Pennsylvania's deputy adjutant general. During his general officer assignments, Pennsylvania National Guard members deployed for peacekeeping missions including Kosovo Force and Task Force Sinai, as well as combat duty during the Iraq War and the War in Afghanistan, and Marchi took part in command visits to forward deployed forces in locations including Kosovo and Iraq.

== Awards ==
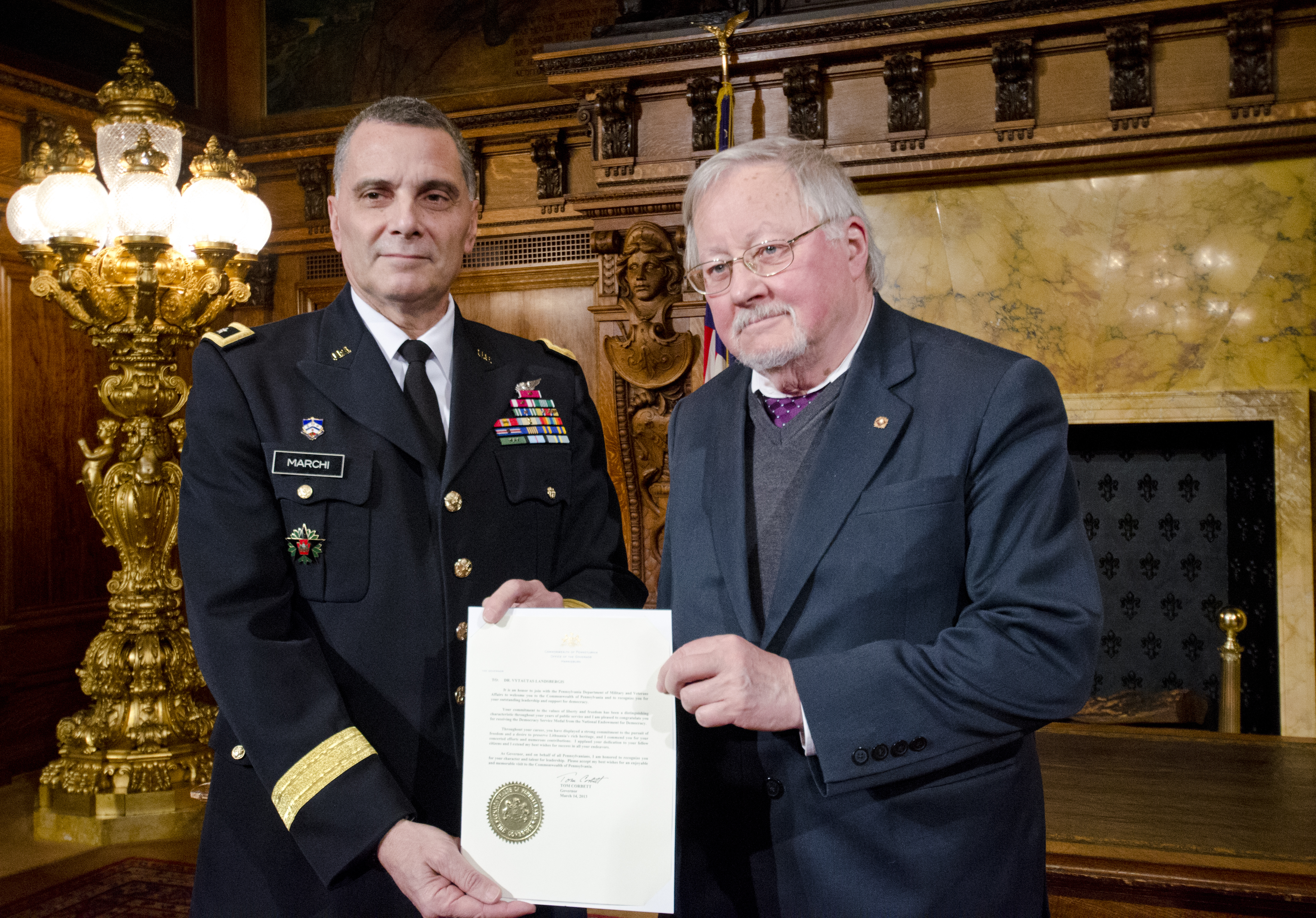
On behalf of Pennsylvania's governor, Marchi presents 2013 proclamation to European Parliament member Vytautas Landsbergis of Latvia

Marchi's federal awards included:

- Legion of Merit with 2 bronze oak leaf clusters
- Meritorious Service Medal with 1 bronze oak leaf cluster
- Army Commendation Medal
- Army Achievement Medal with 1 bronze oak leaf cluster
- Army Reserve Components Achievement Medal with 1 silver oak leaf cluster and 3 bronze oak leaf clusters
- National Defense Service Medal with 2 bronze service stars
- Armed Forces Reserve Medal with gold and bronze hourglasses
- Army Service Ribbon
- Army Reserve Components Overseas Training Ribbon with numeral 2
- Air Crew Badge

Marchi's state awards included:

- Pennsylvania Commendation Medal
- Pennsylvania Service Ribbon with numeral 4
- Pennsylvania Twenty Year Service Medal with 4 silver stars
- Major General Thomas R. White Jr. Medal
- General Thomas J. Stewart Medal
- The Adjutant General's Staff Identification Badge

== Dates of rank ==
Marchi's dates of rank were:

- Major General, 6 July 2009
- Brigadier General, 16 April 2007
- Colonel, 17 June 2004
- Lieutenant Colonel, 14 January 2000
- Major, 2 March 1994
- Captain, 8 January 1986
- First Lieutenant, 10 May 1983
- Second Lieutenant, 11 May 1980
- Enlisted service, 1973 to 10 May 1980
