= Asher Miner =

American businessman and military officer (1860–1924)

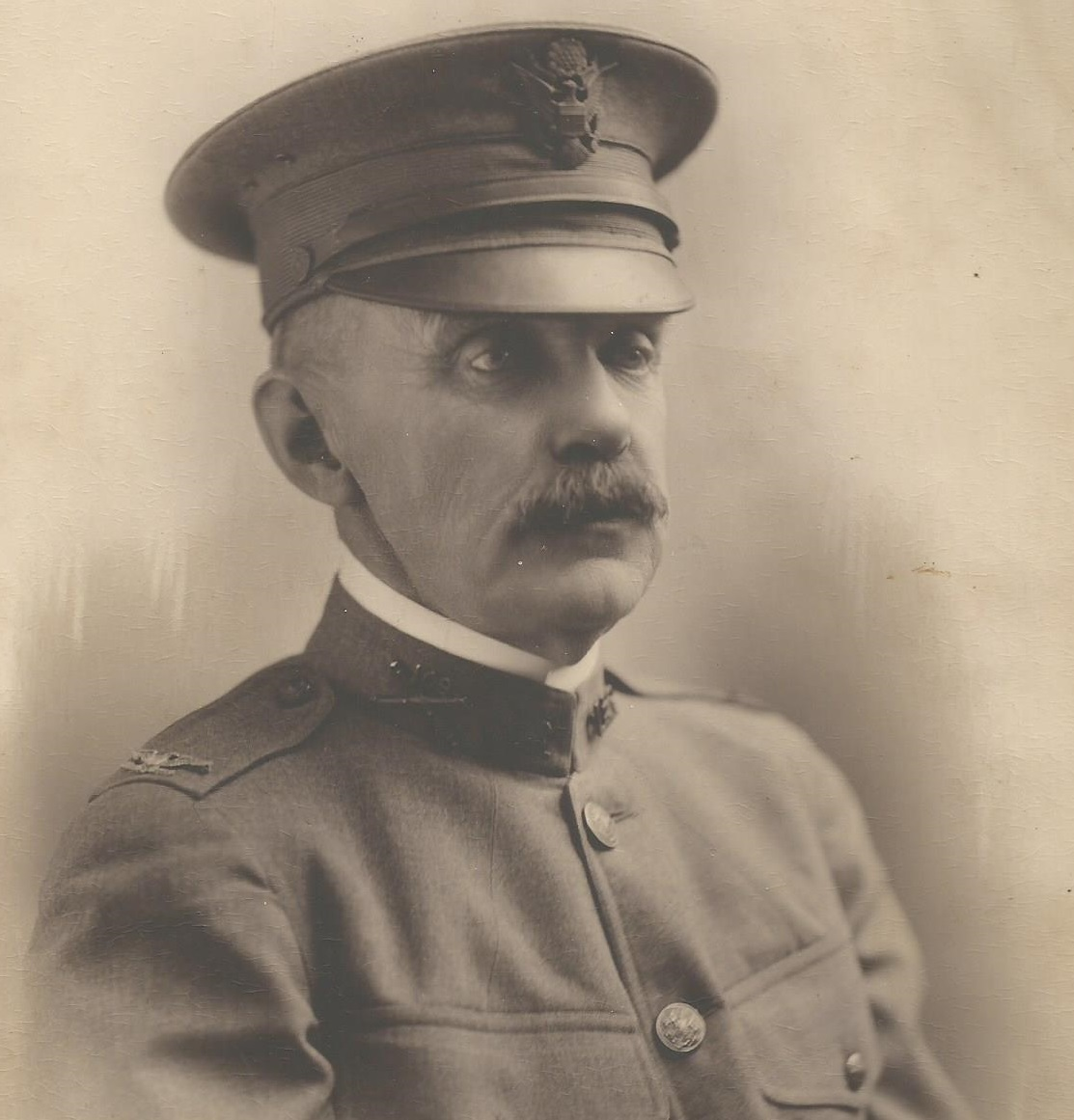
- Miner as a colonel commanding the 109th Field Artillery during World War I
- Born: November 14, 1860; Wilkes-Barre, Pennsylvania, U.S.
- Died: September 2, 1924 (aged 63); Wilkes-Barre, Pennsylvania
- Burial place: Hollenback Cemetery, Wilkes-Barre, Pennsylvania
- Spouse: Hetty McNair Lonsdale (m. 1889-1922, her death)
- Children: 5
- Military career
- Allegiance: United States; Pennsylvania
- Branch: United States Army
- Service years: 1884-1890; 1895-1912; 1916-1923
- Rank: Brigadier General (National Guard); Major General (Retired List)
- Unit: Pennsylvania Army National Guard
- Commands: 7th Pennsylvania Infantry Regiment; 9th Pennsylvania Infantry Regiment; 3rd Pennsylvania Field Artillery Regiment; 109th Field Artillery Regiment; 53rd Field Artillery Brigade
- Conflicts: Spanish–American War; Pancho Villa Expedition; World War I
- Awards: Distinguished Service Cross; Army Distinguished Service Medal
- Other work: Business executive Member, Pennsylvania House of Representatives

Asher Miner (November 14, 1860 – September 2, 1924) was an American businessman and military officer from Wilkes-Barre, Pennsylvania. He was most notable for his business career as president of the Miner-Hillard Milling Company, the largest grain milling and cereal making company in Pennsylvania, and his service in the Pennsylvania Army National Guard.

During World War I, Miner commanded the 109th Field Artillery Regiment and received the Distinguished Service Cross and Army Distinguished Service Medal for his heroism and service. After the war he commanded the 53rd Field Artillery Brigade and attained the rank of brigadier general. When he retired from the military in 1923, Miner was promoted to major general on the Pennsylvania National Guard's retired list.

== Early life ==
Asher Miner was born in Wilkes-Barre, Pennsylvania on November 14, 1860, the son of Charles Abbott Miner and Eliza Ross (Atherton) Miner. He attended the schools of Wilkes-Barre and Williston Seminary of Easthampton, Massachusetts. He completed his education at Harry Hillman Academy in Wilkes-Barre, then embarked on a business career.

== Businessman ==
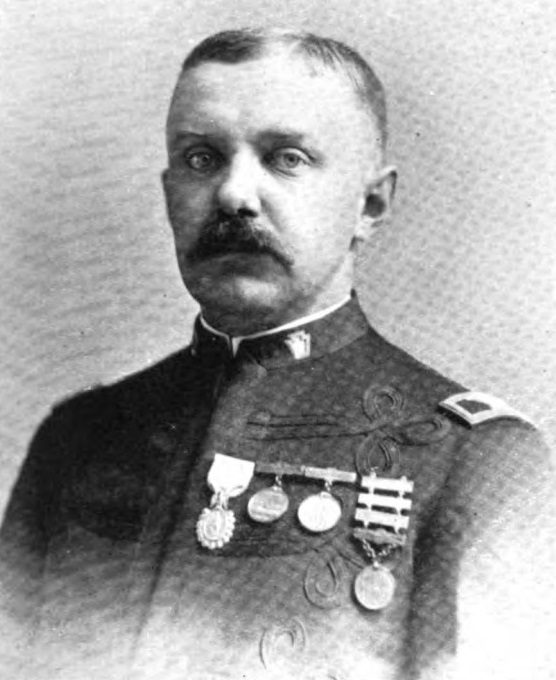
Miner as the Pennsylvania National Guard's inspector of rifle practice in 1896

In 1879, Miner followed his father into the grain milling business by joining the firm of Miner and Thomas. He became a partner in the firm in 1885 and oversaw its expansion, followed by consolidation with other milling firms. In 1894, Miner became president of the Miner-Hillard Milling Company, which operated six mills and became the largest milling and cereal producing company in Pennsylvania. As the head of a well-known milling enterprise, Miner's prominence led to a high-profile role with the Millers' National Federation, of which he served as a director and an officer.

Miner was active in several other business ventures, including serving on the board of directors of the Wyoming National Bank. In addition, he was a director of the Wilkes-Barre Hotel Company and Matheson Motor Car Company. Miner also served as president of the Millers' Mutual Fire Insurance Company. In addition, he served as president of the Wilkes-Barre Board of Trade and the Pennsylvania State Millers' Association. Active in local politics and government as a Republican, Miner served in the Pennsylvania House of Representatives from 1907 to 1909.

== Military career ==
=== Early career ===
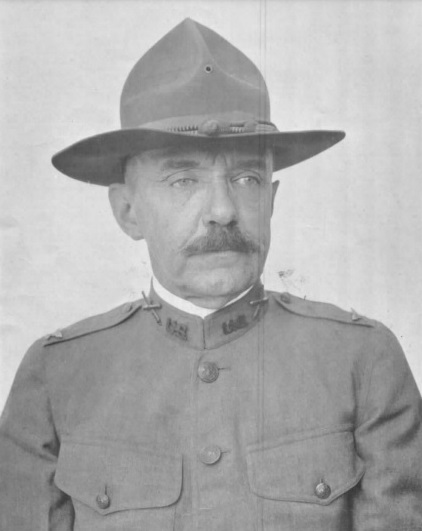
Miner as commander of the 3rd Pennsylvania Field Artillery, circa 1916

In April 1884, Miner joined the Pennsylvania Army National Guard as a private in Company D, 9th Pennsylvania Infantry Regiment. He was promoted to corporal in July 1884. In January 1885, he received his commission as a second lieutenant. He was promoted to first lieutenant in July 1887. He was promoted to captain in July 1888, and resigned in October 1890.

In May 1895, Miner returned to military service as the Pennsylvania National Guard's general inspector of rifle practice with the rank of colonel. During the Spanish–American War, Miner was called to active duty and assigned to provide training and evaluation in rifle marksmanship for Pennsylvania National Guard soldiers who had volunteered for service in Cuba. In August 1898, he was appointed to command the 7th Pennsylvania Infantry Regiment. In January 1907, he was assigned to command the 9th Pennsylvania Infantry Regiment. In October 1907, Miner commanded the regiment when it provided the escort for the governor during his review of the Pennsylvania Day exhibits at the Jamestown Exposition. Miner resigned from the National Guard in 1912.

In 1916, Miner returned to service as commander of the 9th Pennsylvania Infantry, which was reorganized as the 3rd Pennsylvania Field Artillery Regiment. Miner led his command during service on the U.S.-Mexico border as part of the Pancho Villa Expedition.

=== World War I ===
During World War I, the 3rd Field Artillery was federalized as the 109th Field Artillery Regiment. While leading his regiment during the Meuse–Argonne offensive, Miner was severely wounded in fighting near Apremont, Ardennes. During the battle, one of Miner's batteries was providing direct support to an advancing Infantry unit and was required to move to a new position after receiving German counterbattery fire. Miner personally went forward to direct the battery to a new firing position and was struck by shrapnel from an incoming shell. He received too many wounds to count, and the lower portion of his right leg was blown off. Despite his wounds, Miner continued to direct his troops until he lost consciousness, after which several soldiers carried him to the rear area for medical aid rather than waiting for an ambulance, an action that was later credited with saving his life by ensuring he received immediate treatment.

=== Post-World War I ===
After returning to the United States, Miner was promoted to brigadier general as commander of the Pennsylvania National Guard's 53rd Field Artillery Brigade. He remained in command of the brigade until retiring in July 1923. When he left the military, Miner was promoted to major general on the Pennsylvania National Guard's retired list.

== Awards ==
For his World War I service, Miner received both the Distinguished Service Cross and the Army Distinguished Service Medal.

His Distinguished Service Cross citation reads:

For extraordinary heroism in action while serving as Commanding Officer, 109th Field Artillery, 28th Division, A.E.F., at Apremont, France, 4 October 1918. One of the batteries of the regiment commanded by this officer, assigned to an advanced position in direct support of an infantry attack, was heavily shelled by the enemy while it was going into action. It being necessary, therefore, to take another position, Colonel Miner went forward under heavy shell fire and personally supervised the placing of the guns in the new position. Colonel Miner continued his efforts until he received a severe wound that later necessitated the amputation of his leg.

Service: Army Rank: Colonel Division: 28th Division, American Expeditionary Forces General Orders: War Department, General Orders No. 140 (1918)

Miner's Army Distinguished Service Medal citation reads:

For exceptionally meritorious and distinguished services to the Government of the United States, in a duty of great responsibility during World War I. Colonel Miner served with notable success as Commanding Officer of the 109th Field Artillery, 28th Division, giving proof of high qualities of leadership. Inspiring his men by his self-sacrificing devotion to duty he maintained a creditable standard of efficiency in his regiment and constantly furnished the most effective artillery support to the attacking Infantry.

Service: Army Rank: Colonel Division: 28th Division, American Expeditionary Forces General Orders: War Department, General Orders No. 89 (1919)

== Death and burial ==
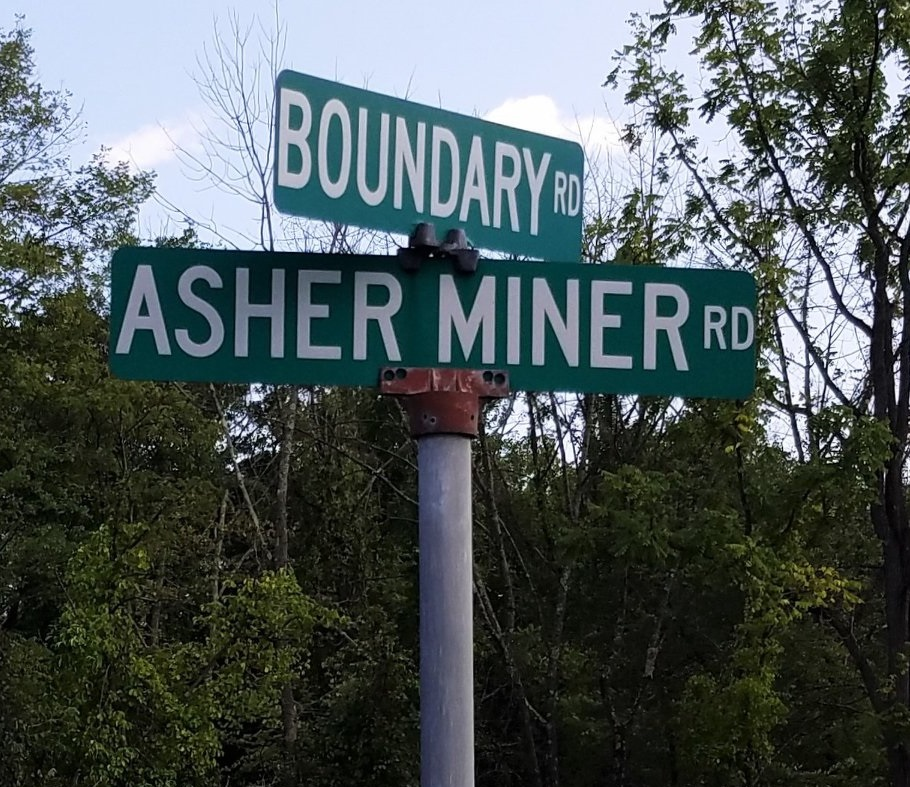
Road sign marking Asher Miner Road at Fort Indiantown Gap, Pennsylvania

Miner died in Wilkes-Barre on September 2, 1924. According to contemporary news accounts, Miner suffered from a ruptured appendix, which was operated on unsuccessfully. He was buried at Hollenback Cemetery in Wilkes-Barre.

== Family ==
In 1889, Miner married Hetty McNair Lonsdale (1865-1922). They were the parents of five children: Helen Lea, Elizabeth Ross, Robert Charles, Margaret Mercer, and Hetty Lonsdale.

== Legacy ==
Asher Miner Road at Fort Indiantown Gap is named for Miner. A Veterans of Foreign Wars post in Wilkes-Barre was also named for Miner. In addition, the Wilkes-Barre Post of the Society of the 28th Division was named in Miner's honor.

The General Asher Miner Memorial at the Pennsylvania Military Museum in Boalsburg, Pennsylvania was dedicated on September 9, 1924. Miner Park, a recreational facility in Wilkes-Barre, is also named for Miner.
