= Hill House (Boalsburg, Pennsylvania) =

Historic house in Pennsylvania, United States

- U.S. National Register of Historic Places
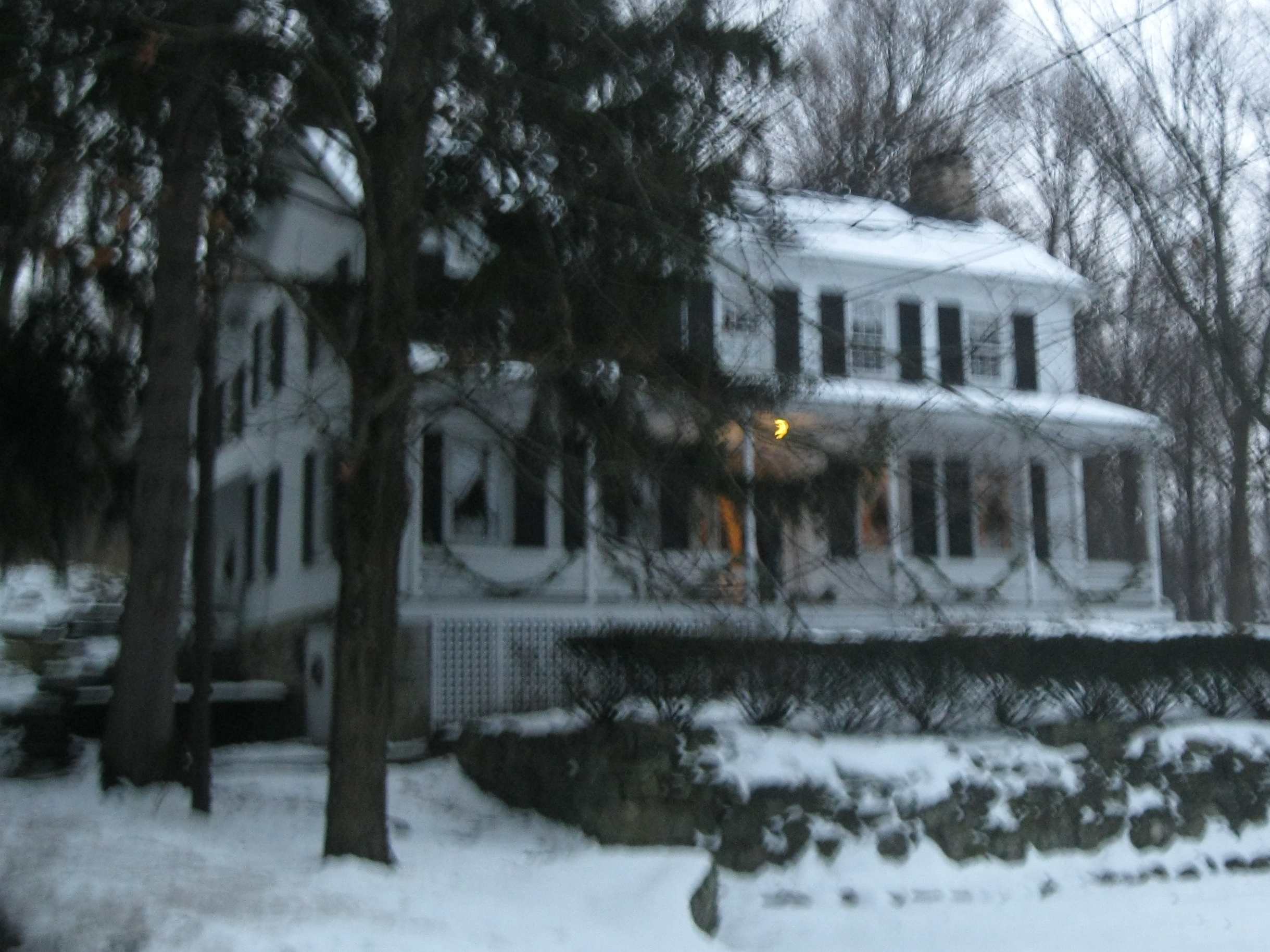
- The house in 2013

- Location within Pennsylvania Location within the United States
- Location: Tennis St., Boalsburg, Harris Township, Pennsylvania
- Coordinates: 40°46′22″N 77°47′43″W
- Area: less than one acre
- Built: c. 1830
- NRHP reference No.: 77001140
- Added to NRHP: March 28, 1977

Hill House, also known as the Col. James Johnston House, is an historic home which is located in Boalsburg, Harris Township, Centre County, Pennsylvania.

It was added to the National Register of Historic Places in 1977.

== History and architectural features ==
Built sometime around 1830, Hill House is a two-and-one-half-story, five-bay, stone dwelling with a gable roof, attic, and basement, which measures 46 by 24 feet (14.0 by 7.3 m). It has a stone and frame rear kitchen ell that measures 20 by 18 feet (6.1 by 5.5 m), and was built by Col. James Johnston, one of the principal figures in the growth of the town of Boalsburg.
