= Tussey Mountain (ski resort) =

Ski area in Pennsylvania, United States

Coordinates: 40.7682°N 77.7520°W

- Interactive map of Tussey Mountain
- Location: Boalsburg, Centre County, Pennsylvania, United States
- Nearest city: State College, Pennsylvania
- Vertical: 500 feet (150 m)
- Top elevation: 1,819 feet (554 m)
- Skiable area: 38 acres (150,000 m^{2})
- Trails: 14 total
- Longest run: 3,960 feet (1,210 m)
- Lift system: 5 total
- Website: www.tusseymountain.com

Tussey Mountain is a ski resort and all-seasons recreation area located in Boalsburg, Centre County, Pennsylvania, near State College and Penn State University and is the gateway to the Rothrock State Forest. Tussey Mountain includes the Tussey Mountain Amphitheater for concerts and festivals, a Lodge for weddings and parties, and a Fun Centre that offers go-karts, mini-golf, batting cages, a skate park, driving range and a par 3 golf course. Discounted rates are offered for students of Penn State University. In the winter season, Tussey Mountain has 14 trails, with the longest one being about 3/4 of a mile. The top elevation at Tussey Mountain is 1,819 feet (554 m), and there are 38 acres (150,000 m^{2}) skiable at the Tussey Mountain Ski Area. The ski area was originally called Skimont Resort and was inaugurated in December, 1962.

== Trails ==
There are 14 ski trails in total at Tussey Mountain. Little Bear is the beginner slope and is served by its own double chair lift. A larger quad chair lift services Deer Run, Grizzly, Utah, Lower Tuscarora, Doc White, Upper Tuscarora, Upper Shamokin, Lower Shamokin, Winter’s Way, Tower 3 Chute, Chicken Ridge, Grizzly Glades, and Lion’s Way. Winter's Way trail is typically used to set up the TMP Terrain Park. Chicken Ridge and Tower 3 Chute are short offshoots of other trails. Lion's Way, along with Upper Shamokin, Lower Shamokin, and the Grizzly Glades, are open only when enough natural snowfall exists - all other trails have snowmaking capabilities. The trails with snowmaking also have lights, allowing for night skiing. A T-bar lift also services the mountain on occasion.

There is also a snow tubing area with up to 5 tubing lanes and one lift.
