= Boalsburg Historic District =

Historic district in Pennsylvania, United States

- U.S. National Register of Historic Places
- U.S. Historic district
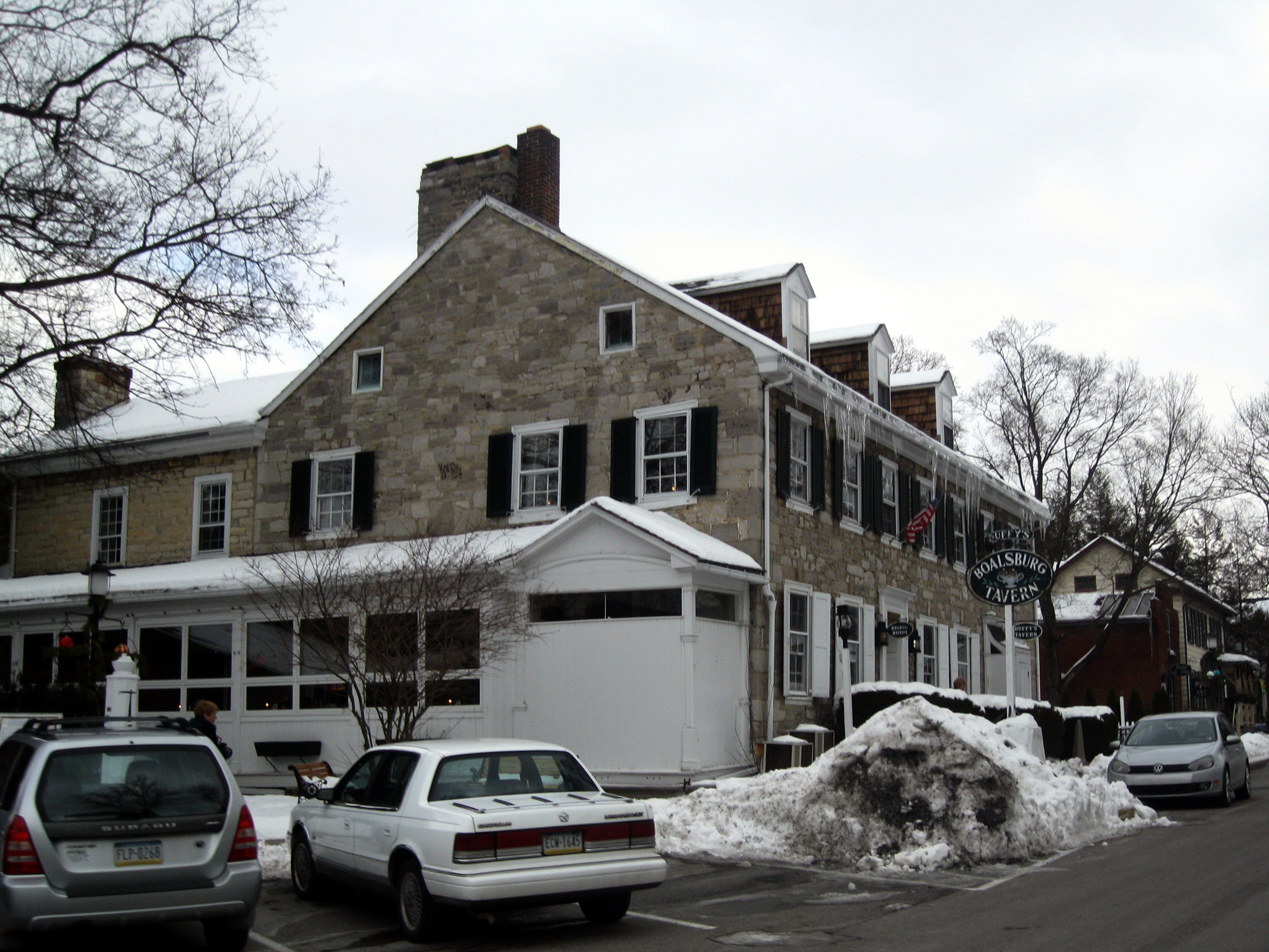
- The Boalburg Tavern in the historic district in 2013

- Location within Pennsylvania Location within the United States
- Location: U.S. 322, Boalsburg, Pennsylvania
- Coordinates: 40°46′34″N 77°47′38″W
- Area: 50 acres (20 ha)
- Built: 1809
- Architectural style: Late Victorian, Georgian
- NRHP reference No.: 77001139
- Added to NRHP: December 12, 1977

Boalsburg Historic District is a national historic district located in the village of Boalsburg in Harris Township Centre County, Pennsylvania, United States. The district includes 140 contributing buildings in the central business district and surrounding residential areas of Boalsburg. The district is characterized by a predominance of Georgian and Victorianized-Georgian buildings dated from 1803 to 1870. Notable non-residential buildings include the David Boal Tavern (1803), Wolf's Inn (1803-1832), and Boalsburg Tavern (1819). Located in the district is the separately listed Boal Mansion.

It was added to the National Register of Historic Places in 1977.
