= Pennsylvania Military Museum =

Museum in Pennsylvania, USA

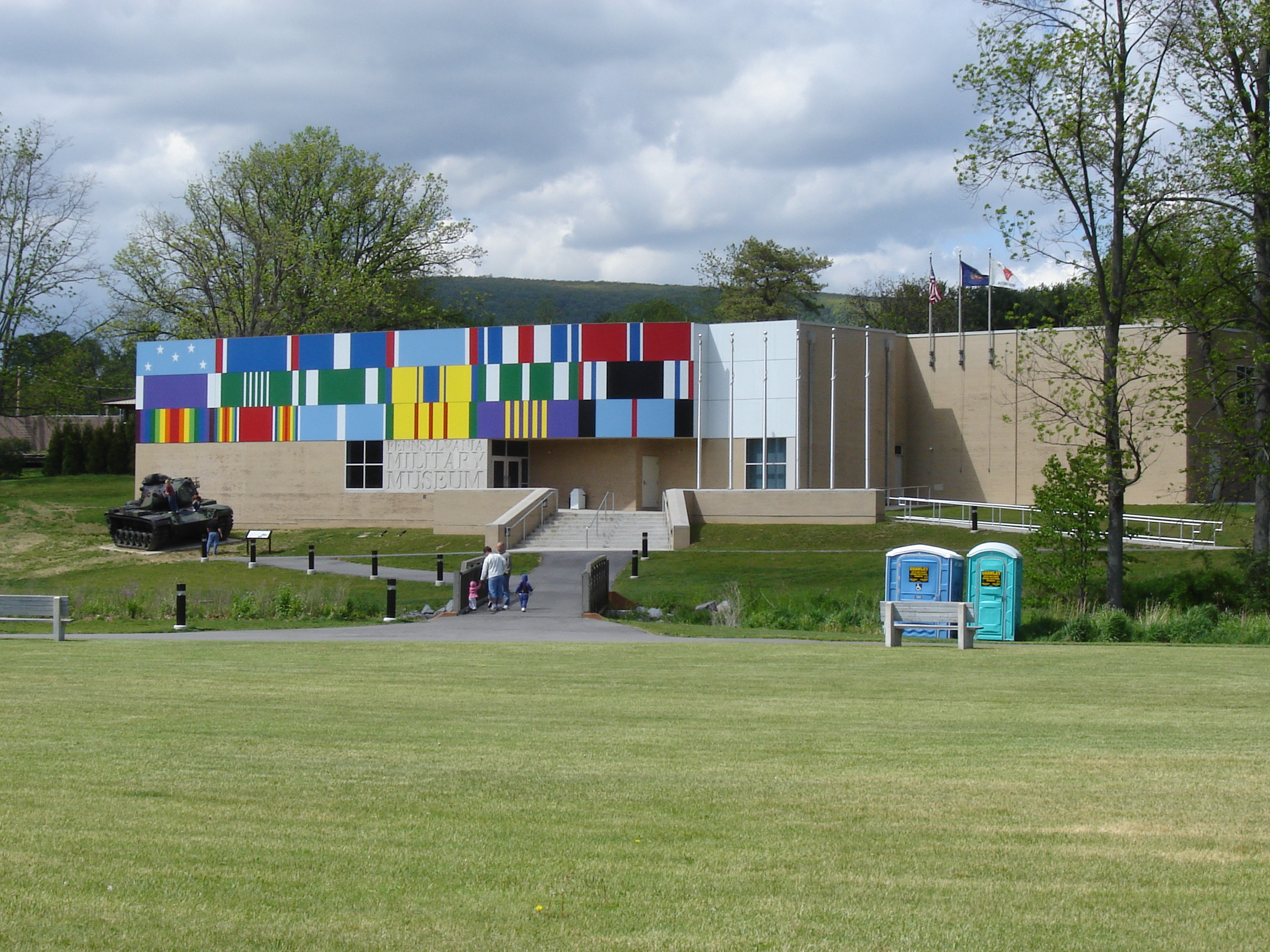
- Main museum building

- Location within Pennsylvania
- Established: 1968
- Location: Boalsburg, Pennsylvania
- Coordinates: 40.7819°N 77.7953°W
- Type: Military museum
- Website: www.pamilmuseum.org

The Pennsylvania Military Museum is a museum dedicated to the military history of Pennsylvania in Boalsburg, Pennsylvania, established in 1968. It is operated by the Pennsylvania Historical and Museum Commission.

== Monuments ==
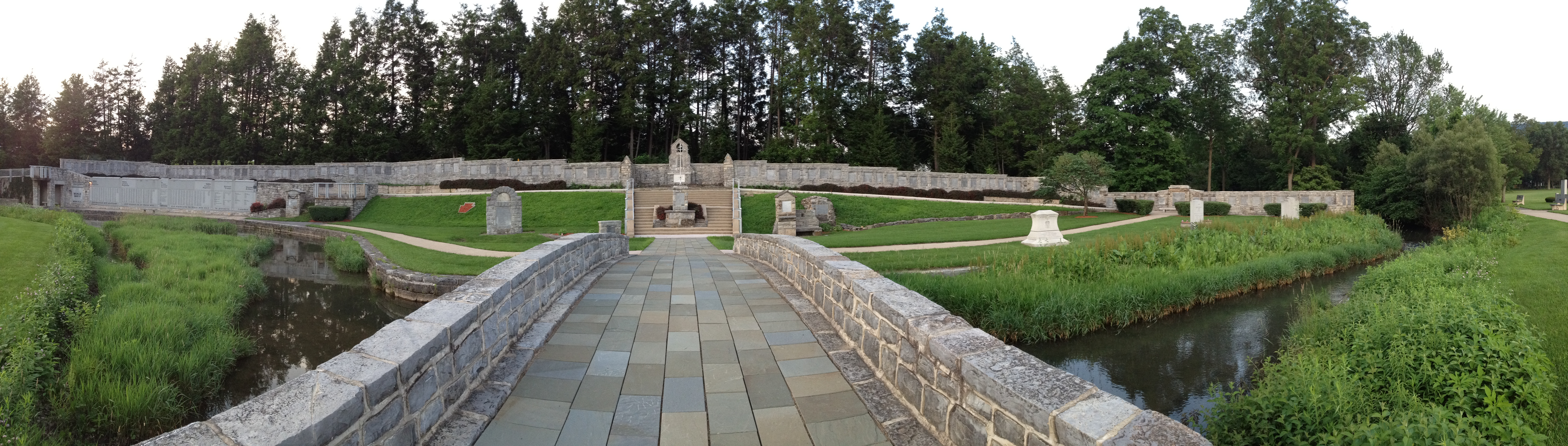
28th Division Shrine

The monuments and memorials at the Pennsylvania Military Museum currently include:

- 103rd Engineers Memorial Fountain
- 103rd Medical Battalion Memorial
- 107th Field Artillery Memorial
- 108th Field Artillery Memorial
- 108th Machine Gun Battalion Memorial
- 109th Field Artillery Train Wreck Memorial
- 109th Infantry Field Artillery Memorial
- 109th Infantry Memorial
- 109th Machine Gun Battalion
- 110th Infantry Memorial
- 111th Infantry Memorial
- 112th Infantry Memorial
- 112th Machine Gun Battalion Memorial
- 1st Lieutenant Henry Lami Memorial
- 28th Division Global War on Terror Monument
- 28th Division Memorial
- 28th Signal Battalion
- 2nd Brigade Combat Team
- Bazooka Boogie Monument
- Brigadier General Edward Sigerfoos Memorial
- General Asher Miner Memorial
- Headquarters Troop Memorial
- Korean Call Up Monument
- Lieutenant Colonel James A. Shannon Memorial
- Major Thomas B. Anderson Memorial
- Shrine To Colonel Theodore D. Boal
- Wallace W. Fetzer Memorial
- World War I Officers Memory Wall
- World War II Memory Wall

The museum also features two guns from the battleship USS Pennsylvania.

== Exterior displays ==
- M4A1(76)W Sherman Tank
- M60A3 Tank
- M42A1 Duster
- M59 APC
- M114A2 155mm Howitzer
- 4.5" Howitzer
