= 108th Field Artillery Regiment =

1st Battalion, 108th Field Artillery Regiment
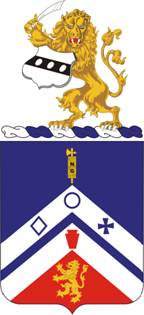
- 1st Battalion, 108th Field Artillery coat of arms
- Active: December 11, 1840 – present
- Country: United States
- Branch: U.S. Army National Guard
- Type: Field Artillery
- Role: Direct Support
- Part of: 56th Stryker Brigade Combat Team
- Garrison/HQ: Carlisle, Pennsylvania
- Mottos: Latin: Non sibi sed patriae Not Self—But Country
- Engagements: American Civil War; World War I World War II; Korean War; Operation Iraqi Freedom

Commanders
- Current commander: LTC Keith C. Conrad
- Notable commanders: MG Randall R. Marchi; BG Jeffrey Heasley

Insignia
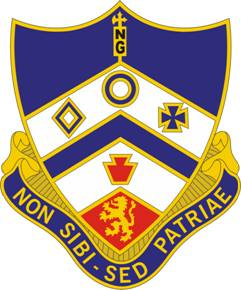
- Distinctive unit insignia

The 1st Battalion, 108th Field Artillery Regiment, 56th Stryker Brigade Combat Team, is the only direct support field artillery battalion in the only National Guard Stryker Brigade in the United States Army.

== Mission ==
The 1-108th Field Artillery's mission in support of the 56th SBCT is to provide accurate and responsive fires including close and counterfire to the maneuver units of the SBCT.

== History ==
The 108th Field Artillery was formed on December 11, 1840, at a time when many militia units were forming across the country. It was established as an infantry company in the 1st Volunteer Infantry Regiment by CPT Thomas Tustin and was called The National Guards after the Marquis de Lafayette's unit Les Guardes de Nationale, one of several in the state to use this name. It recruited for the Mexican War and volunteered for service but it was not needed since Pennsylvania had already supplied its required quota of troops. In 1856 the unit incorporated itself as the Infantry Corps of National Guards of the City of Philadelphia, Pennsylvania. The unit eventually expanded from a company to a battalion and by 1860 it expanded into a regiment, the 2d Infantry Regiment, and paraded as such on December 11, 1860. It was part of the Reserve Brigade Militia and was known as the First Blue Reserves. On February 22, 1861, the Regiment was in Harrisburg to receive President-elect Abraham Lincoln.

At the beginning of the Civil War, the regiment volunteered for three months' service and became the 19th Regiment Pennsylvania Volunteers. The regiment served the majority of its time garrisoning and occupying the City of Baltimore as it harbored a large number of Confederate sympathizers. It was instrumental in the apprehension of Marshal Kane, the Sheriff of Baltimore, who was a Confederate sympathizer suspected of planning revolt. At the end of the ninety days, a large portion opted to re-enlist thus forming a new unit called the 90th Regiment Pennsylvania Volunteers. The unit was equipped with modified Harper's Ferry .69 caliber smoothbore muskets. The 90th saw action at Second Manassas (where it suffered approximately 218 casualties), Antietam and Fredericksburg in 1862. In 1863, the regiment was lightly engaged during the battle of Chancellorsville but was in heavy fighting at Gettysburg. The 90th was part of the 2nd Brigade, 2nd Division, I Corps in the Army of the Potomac. It was heavily involved during the battle on July 1, 1863, and was positioned as the far right of the I Corps line. When the XI Corps was forced to retreat the regiments right flank was exposed and forced to fall back.

It was at this time, during the retreat through town that the Regimental Chaplain was killed after visiting with the wounded of the regiment who were in a church behind enemy lines. The 90th then spent the rest of the battle in reserve arriving on the scene of Picket's Charge just as it was being repulsed. During the battle, the regiment suffered 8 killed, 45 wounded and 40 missing/captured. The majority of the casualties occurred on the first day with most of the missing captured during the retreat through town. After Gettysburg, the unit took part in the fall campaign in Virginia. In 1864, the regiment took part in the battles of Wilderness, Spottsylvania and Cold Harbor suffering several hundred casualties. The regiment took place in the campaign leading up to Petersburg and the early stages of the Siege of Petersburg. It was engaged at Petersburg during the fateful mine explosion on June 30, 1864. During a skirmish at Weedon Station on July 17–18, 1864, the regiment was heavily engaged and Confederate troops had succeeded in penetrating the unit on the 90th's right flank and were in the rear of the 90th. The 90th began to receive fire from both the Confederates and the Union Artillery to its rear. The regiment received the order to withdraw but lost approximately 90 men captured including its commander LTC Leech and around 20 dead and wounded. The survivors were pulled from the line and those soldiers whose enlistments had not expired were merged with the 11th Pennsylvania Volunteer Infantry. The 90th Regiment fought in 12 campaigns during the Civil War and earned seven Medals of Honor. During the Civil War, the unit suffered well over eight hundred casualties including 103 combat deaths; it also suffered 127 non-battle deaths in its three years of service. After the heavy fighting during the Petersburg Campaign, the unit was mustered out of Federal Service on November 26, 1864.

After the Civil War, the unit was re-designated as the 2nd Infantry Regiment in 1867. It served in this capacity for the remainder of the nineteenth century and was activated by the Governor for the Great Railroad Strike of 1877. During the strike, violence erupted and shots were fired. Several Guardsmen were killed as well as some strikers. In 1898 the regiment was activated for the Spanish–American War but did not serve outside the United States. Instead, the unit spent the majority of their service guarding several areas vital to national security to include the Dupont Powder Works in Delaware.

In 1916 the regiment was again activated for service on the Mexican border as part of the Mexican Punitive Expedition after Pancho Villa's raid. The regiment served in Texas the entire period. On October 23, 1916, while still in Texas, the regiment was converted from an infantry unit to a field artillery and trained on 4.7 inch howitzers. The regiment was now called the 2nd Field Artillery Regiment, PNG. The regiment trained in its new role as artillerymen until the end of the crisis in February 1917.

The unit did not have long to practice their new skills when their country called them again. This time, for service in France during World War I. The unit was activated on July 24, 1917, and later was redesignated as the 108th Field Artillery Regiment. It was sent to Camp Hancock, GA in the late summer of 1917. It was part of the 53rd Field Artillery Brigade, which was part of the 28th Division. After training in Georgia for several months and receiving new recruits to bring it up to combat strength, the unit was transferred to Camp Utpton in April 1918. On May 18–19, the 108th with the rest of the 53rd FA Brigade set sail for England and arrived overseas on May 31, 1918, in Liverpool, and from there it went to Le Havre, France. After a brief stay in Le Havre, the regiment went to train on the French artillery pieces at Fort de Meucon. The 108th was equipped with, and trained heavily on, French 155 mm M1917 Schnieder howitzers. After extensive training with the French, the 108th and the rest of the 53rd FA Brigade rejoined the 28th Division on August 8, 1918, during fighting around Fismettes. Fismettes was taken and then lost, then retaken during late August, until the Germans retreated across the Aisne River in early September. On September 8, 1918, the whole 28th Division was relieved by the French 62nd Division and the 28th Division began to move toward Clermont-en-Argonne. During the night from September 19–20, 1918 the division re-entered the front line relieving the French 73rd and 120th Divisions in preparation for the Meuse-Argonne Offensive. On September 26, 1918, the division launched its attack as part of the Meuse-Argonne Offensive. The 55th Brigade captured the town of Varennes and soon after, the 108th had set up firing positions in the town and was firing in support of the divisions advance. The 108th fired missions in support of the 82nd Division after the 28th Division was withdrawn from the front. They were soon detached from the 28th Division and sent north to Belgium and fought with the 91st Division in the Ypres sector. They did not rejoin the 28th Division until the spring of 1919 in LeMans, France just prior to their departure. They earned five campaign streamers for actions in which they participated.

After it demobilized the unit began to reorganize over the period from 1919 to 1920 and became known as the 2nd Field Artillery, Pennsylvania National Guard. On April 21, 1921, it became known as the 108th Field Artillery, Corps Troops. In late 1926, after several years of discussion on its design, the regiment Coat of Arms and Distinctive Unit Insignia were approved as currently worn by members. Also, in 1926, the 108th had as a visitor during its Annual Training the III Corps Area Commander, MG Douglas MacArthur. During Annual Training 1932 the 3-108th FA teamed with the 103rd Observation Squadron and used an air observer in fire missions. In 1936 the 108th updated its Schneider howitzers by getting pneumatic tires. In 1938 the regiment was once again at the forefront of joint air-ground operations when it used an auto-gyro (a forerunner to the helicopter) for fire missions and to recon firing positions.

A little over twenty years after fighting in France the country once again called on the 108th FA, this time to fight Germany in World War II. In February 1941 the regiment was activated for one year under a call up for the national emergency as declared by President Roosevelt. On December 7, 1941, the war came and the 12-month activation became indefinite. In 1942, the regiment was split.

Headquarters and Headquarters Battery 108th FA became Headquarters and Headquarters Battery 193rd Field Artillery Group, 1st Battalion 108th FA became the 193rd Field Artillery Battalion and 2nd Battalion became the 108th FA Battalion.

The 108th FA Bn fought as part of the 28th Infantry Division in Europe with M1 155mm Howitzers from Normandy Beach to the Battle of the Bulge and into Germany. The 108th trained in the US and later Wales for amphibious operations. It was originally scheduled to make an amphibious landing on the Cherbourg Peninsula but it was canceled when the peninsula was over-run. The 108th took part in the liberation of Paris and marched through the city. By September 1944 it was located along the northern Luxembourg border and Germany was within range of the guns. It was involved in the heavy fighting in the Battle of the Huertgen Forest in November 1944 where the division suffered heavy casualties. After being pulled out of the Huertgen Forest the unit was assigned to a quiet sector along the Our River to rest and take in replacements. On 16 December the German Wehrmacht began their Ardennes Offensive also known as the Battle of The Bulge. The brunt of the offensive was directed against the 28th Division which was holding a front of over 20 miles. During the Battle of the Bulge the 108th was stationed in support of the 109th Infantry outside of the town of Diekirch alongside the 107th FA. Shortly after 1000 on December 16, 1944, elements of the German Army bypassed units of the 109th INF and were firing into A Battery of the 108th. The men had seen figures moving through the fog but thought they were American. Fierce action commenced as the gunners were forced to fight as infantry and other batteries provided support. As the 109th struggled to hold their line against the German attack the 108th was able to provide support from their 155mm howitzers pinning German shock troops on the bank of the Our River. The next day the Germans renewed their attack and once again A Battery 108th FA, along with A Battery 107th FA came under heavy German attack. Once again they fought as infantry while other batteries provided support. LTC James Rosborough (a former member of the 108th from World War I, who rose to command the battalion in 1942), commander of the 107th FA, gathered a force and rescued the two batteries. For his actions, LTC Rosborough was awarded the Distinguished Service Cross.

Although the batteries were saved, they could no longer remain in their firing positions and were forced to displace. The 109th's position had become untenable and it was forced to withdraw. The 108th and 107th provided covering fire while the infantry withdrew. The Battalion earned five campaign streamers and was awarded the Luxembourg Croix de Guerre for actions in that country.

After World War II the 108th FA Battalion was reorganized with elements of the 108th FA Battalion and HHB 193rd FA Group in November 1946. The 193rd FA Battalion (former 1st Battalion 108th FA) was redesignated as the 235th FA Observation Battalion. Once again however, peace was shattered when in early June 1950 when North Korea invaded South Korea. The 28th Infantry Division and the 108th were sent to Camp Atterbury, Indiana, and later, Germany. The 235th was activated and sent to Fort Sill OK prior to shipping to Korea. The 235th arrived in Korea during the winter of 1953 and was assigned to the Eighth Army. The 235th served with II Corps, Republic of Korea's army during the Battle of the Komsung Bulge. For its actions, Battery C earned a letter of commendation from the commander of II Corps ROK and the ROK Army Chief of Staff. They were also awarded a Meritorious Unit Commendation by General Taylor, Commander of UN Forces in Korea, and two campaign streamers.

After the Korean War, the 108th was merged with the 235th Field Artillery Battalion in December 1954. It was known as the 108th FA Bn and was armed with 155mm Howitzers. In 1959 the Combat Arms Regimental System was begun and the 108th was named as one of the parent regiments. At this time it consisted of the 1st Rocket Howitzer Battalion. It was armed with Honest John Rockets and 8-inch Howitzers. In the mid-sixties, the unit became all rocket with 2 Honest John Rocket Batteries.

The unit served through the 1960s and early 1970s in this capacity until 1975. At this time the 1-108th Field Artillery was deactivated and replaced with the 108th Combat Support Hospital who carried the original 108th Campaign Honors. Meanwhile, across the state, a new 1/108th FA was organized from elements of the 104th Cavalry. In 1997 the 108th Combat Support Hospital was deactivated and the 1/108th FA was given the Lineage and Honors of the 108th Field Artillery as a challenge and trust.

With the bestowing of these honors a new unit, Detachment 1 Headquarters and Headquarters Battery, was formed by members from Headquarters Battery and former members of the Hospital. The 1-108th FA was then equipped with the M-109A5 155mm self-propelled howitzer and organized with three batteries of six guns each. It supports the 56th Brigade of the 28th Infantry Division (Mechanized). In June 2001, the 1-108th was selected as part of the 56th Brigade to transform into the Stryker Brigade Combat Team. In June 2003 Detachment 1, HHB completed its transition to become C Battery and the Lineage and Honors officially transferred. In July 2003 the 108th completed a transition to the M198 155mm towed howitzer.

Current members of the 108th Field Artillery have contributed to the NATO peacekeeping mission in Bosnia and Kosovo, as well as homeland defense missions at the airports and nuclear power plants. In December 2003, two officers were transferred to other DIVARTY units to take part in Operation Iraqi Freedom returning in 2005. Five other soldiers deployed as members of Task Force Dragoon, 2nd Brigade Combat Team, and training the Afghanistan National Army.

In September 2005, the battalion was alerted and deployed to Louisiana in support of the relief effort in the wake of Hurricane Katrina as part of the 56th SBCT. The battalion assembled and deployed within 72 hours of alert and conducted a motor-march from their home armories to Alexandria, LA before proceeding to New Orleans. There the Battalion distributed food and conducted convoy operations transporting vital relief supplies. The unit was located at Riverdale HS renamed Forward Operating Base Red Saber for the 1-108th FA and the 2-104th Cav (RSTA). It was located here when Hurricane Rita hit and immediately after this that the Battalion re-located to Lafayette where is assisted South Central LA and established a Regional Supply Area. The unit remained there from late September until early October 2005 when it returned home. For their efforts, members of the Battalion were awarded the LA Emergency Service Medal and the Battalion as a whole was awarded the Governors Unit Citation.

The battalion was the first National Guard unit to be issued and fire the M777A2 howitzer in 2008 at Camp Shelby, Mississippi. Under the command of LTC Corey Lake and CSM Stephen Klunk, the battalion deployed in support of Operation Iraqi Freedom 09-11 to Camp Taji, Iraq. Battery B, 1st Battalion, 109th Field Artillery Regiment also deployed to support the 1-108th Battalion. They increased the indirect firing capabilities of the Battalion by establishing Firebase Arrowhead at JSS Istiqlal, Iraq. The battalion was also given ADCON of the 856 Engineer Company and supervision of a contracted security force used to augment base support security capabilities. The battalion had one of the most diverse mission sets in the brigade including: delivery of artillery fires from Camp Taji and JSS Istiqlal, route clearance, base security for Camp Taji, Iraqi Partnership Development, ISR security mission for the village of Taji, a platoon from Battery A supported conducted security operations while attached to 2-104th CAV, and the battalion members provided the security details for the Brigade Commander, and EOD response team, and the embedded provincial reconstruction team (ePRT). Due to the robust and diverse civilian skillsets of the battalion members, the battalion also supported the major effort of Iraqi prisoner release as the US mission in Iraq began to wind down and further control and responsibility was transferred back to the Iraqi Government and military. The battalion was recognized for their outstanding achievements by being awarded the Meritorious Unit Commendation at the end of their tour in Iraq.

In 2024, A Battery of the 1-108th was organized from the members of the other batteries in the battalion to deploy in a security mission at Camp Lemonnier in Djibouti. The unit deployed within the larger Task Force organized by the 1-111th infantry battalion of the Pennsylvania army national guard but included other units from various other states such as Illinois and Puerto Rico.

== Organization ==
The doctrinal organization of an Artillery Battalion in a Stryker Brigade Combat Team is 1 Headquarters & Headquarters Battery and 3 firing batteries. The firing batteries are in a 3 × 6 (3 batteries, 6 howitzers per battery) 155mm towed howitzer composition. The 1-108th FAR is organized of the following units:

- Headquarters & Headquarters Battery (HHB) (Carlisle, PA)
- Alpha Battery (Hanover, PA)
- Bravo Battery (Fayetteville, PA)
- Charlie Battery (Philadelphia, PA)
- Foxtrot Company, 328th Support Battalion (Gettysburg, PA)

== Commanders ==
- 2024-Present LTC Keith Conrad
- 2021-2024 LTC Jason Grentus
- 2019–2021 LTC Luis Mendoza
- 2016-2019 LTC Darryl Bertani
- 2012-2016 LTC Jeffrey Heasley
- 2010-2012 LTC Neil Salkowski
- 2008-2010 LTC Corey Lake
- 2005-2008 LTC Andrew Hutchinson
- 2003-2005 LTC Robert Hodgson
- 2000-2003 LTC Randall Marchi
- 1997-2000 LTC Martin Walker
- 1995-1997 LTC David Gerstenlauer
- 1992-1995 LTC George Hilliard
- 1988-1992 LTC George McClintock
- 1985-1988 LTC Heinrich Babb
- 1980-1985 LTC Clarence Bricker
- 1975-1980 LTC James Dunkelberger
- 1971-1975 LTC William Meehan
- 1963-1971 LTC Peter Platten
- 1962-1963 LTC G. N. DiMascio
- 1953-1962 LTC Theodore Weston II
- 1950-1953 LTC Joseph Minter
- 1949-1950 LTC J. J. Fahey
- 1946-1959 LTC John Fairchild
- 1945-1946 LTC Bernhard Major
- 1944-1945 LTC Henry Thorn
- 1942-1943 LTC James Rosborough
- 1941-1942 COL Edward Hubbs
- 1920-1941 COL William March
- 1919-1920 COL H. S. Williams
- 1918-1919 COL Franc Lecocq
- 1918 LTC Horace Fuller
- 1917-1918 COL E. St John Greble
- 1917 COL Hamilton Turner

== Command Sergeants Major ==
- 2024-Present CSM Allen Metzger
- 2021-2024 CSM Jarett Buchanan
- 2019-2021 CSM Marc Weiss
- 2016–2019 CSM Robert Poloka
- 2012-2016 CSM Kirk P.Dougherty
- 2007-2012 CSM Stephen Klunk
- 2005-2007 CSM Charles Blosser
- 2001-2005 CSM James Staub Jr.
- 1999-2001 CSM James Fonce
- 1997-1999 CSM Howard Buch
- 1990-1996 CSM David Nett
- 1984-1989 CSM Charles Stover Jr.
- 1975-1983 CSM Albert Bell

== Campaigns and state activation ==
- American Civil War
- Spanish–American War
- World War I
- World War II
- Blizzard of 1996 – State Activation
- September 2005 – Hurricane Katrina
- 2008–2009 – Operation Iraqi Freedom 09-11

== Honors ==
The official record of unit honors and awards is retained by the United States Army Center of Military History

Ribbon	Award	Year	Notes
	Luxembourg Croix de Guerre (World War II)		Streamer embroidered LUXEMBOURG
	Meritorious Unit Commendation (Army)		Battery B (Gettysburg), Streamer embroidered EUROPEAN THEATER
	Meritorious Unit Commendation (Army)	1953	Streamer embroidered KOREA 1953
	Pennsylvania Governor's Unit Citation	2005	for service in response to Hurricane Katrina
	Meritorious Unit Commendation (Army)	2009	Streamer embroidered IRAQ 2009

1st Battalion, 108th Field Artillery Regiment Campaign Streamers

Conflict	Streamer	Year(s)
American Civil War	Manassas	1862
American Civil War	Antietam	1862
American Civil War	Fredericksburg	1862
American Civil War	Chancellorsville	1863
American Civil War	Gettysburg	1863
American Civil War	Wilderness	1864
American Civil War	Spotsylvania	1864
American Civil War	Cold Harbor	1864
American Civil War	Petersburg	1864
American Civil War	Virginia	1863
World War I	Oise-Aisne	1918
World War I	Ypres-Lys	1918
World War I	Meuse-Argonne	1918
World War I	Champagne	1918
World War I	Lorraine	1918
World War II	Normandy	1944
World War II	Northern France	1944
World War II	Rhineland	1944
World War II	Ardennes-Alsace	1944
World War II	Central Europe	1945
Korean War	Third Korean Winter	1953
Korean War	Korea, Summer	1953
War on terrorism	Iraqi Sovereignty	2009

Additional Campaign Streamers for HQ Battery (Carlisle)

Conflict	Streamer	Year(s)
World War I	Champagne-Marne	1918
World War I	Aisne-Marne	1918

Additional Campaign Streamers for Alpha Battery (Hanover)

Conflict	Streamer	Year(s)
War with Spain	Puerto Rico	1898
World War I	Champagne-Marne	1918
World War I	Aisne-Marne	1918

Additional Campaign Streamers for C Battery (Chambersburg)

Conflict	Streamer	Year(s)
World War I	Champagne-Marne	1918
World War I	Aisne-Marne	1918
World War II	Naples-Foggia	
World War II	Rome-Arno	
World War II	North Apennines	

Additional Campaign Streamers for Service Battery (Carlisle)

Conflict	Streamer	Year(s)
War with Spain	Puerto Rico	
World War I	Champagne-Marne	1918
World War I	Aisne-Marne	1918
World War II	Algeria-French Morocco (With Arrowhead)	
World War II	Tunisia	
World War II	Naples-Foggia (With Arrowhead)	
World War II	Rome-Arno	
Southwest Asia	Defense of Saudi Arabia	
Southwest Asia	Liberation and Defense of Kuwait	
Southwest Asia	Cease-Fire	

== See also ==
28th Infantry Division
Stryker Brigade Combat Team
Stryker
Field Artillery
