= 109th Field Artillery Regiment =

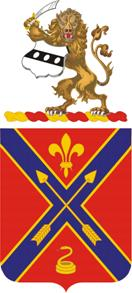
- Coat of arms
- Active: 17 October 1775 - 14 September 2025 (247 Years)
- Country: (United States)
- Branch: Army National Guard
- Type: Field artillery
- Role: USARS parent regiment
- Size: regiment

Insignia
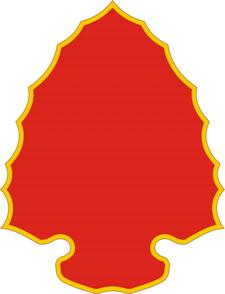
- Distinctive unit insignia

- Should Sleeve Insignia of the 28th Infantry Division, worn by the 109th FA

The 109th Field Artillery Regiment was an artillery regiment of the United States Army and the Pennsylvania Army National Guard.

The unit was organized on 17 October 1775 and was one of several National Guard units with colonial roots. The first unit commander was Colonel Zebulon Butler. The unit traces its origins to the 24th Regiment of the Connecticut Militia, as the Wyoming Valley was part of Connecticut at the time. After alternating between an infantry and artillery unit throughout the early years and campaigns, the battalion was designated as the 109th Field Artillery Regiment on 11 October 1917. The regiment served in combat during World War I and was commanded by Colonel Asher Miner and later by Colonel Charles M. Bundel.

During the 1950s and 1960s, under the Pentomic army structure, the 2nd Battalion, 109th Artillery, served with the 28th Division.

== 1st Battalion ==
1st Battalion, 109th FA, (the "Wyoming Valley Guards") was a battalion of the United States Army, maintained by the Pennsylvania Army National Guard. It was a subordinate formation of the 169th Field Artillery Brigade. Its headquarters was at the historic Kingston Armory located in Kingston, PA. The unit was organized on 17 October 1775, and divested in 2025. It was one of the oldest military units in the United States Army.

In 1984-85 the 1st Battalion was part of the divisional artillery of the 28th Infantry Division.

News articles in 2014 and 2015 claimed that the 55th BCT is under consideration for inactivation by late 2016 and as a result may inactivate the battalion. Today, the unit, part of the 55 Movement Enhancement Bridge, has divested and is no longer activated. Instead, the Pennsylvania Army National Guard implemented the 28th Division Artillery (28 DIVARTY), located at the Kingston Armory.

The task organization has changed multiple times throughout the decades as the force structure of the Army and National Guard changes. As of 2024, the task organization consists of Headquarters, Headquarters Battery, Alpha Battery, Bravo Battery, Charlie Battery, and 2803 Forward Support Company. The unit was deactivated on September 14, 2025 at a ceremony in Wilkes-Barre, Pennsylvania as part of a larger reorganization of the 28th Infantry Division.

== Campaign participation credit ==
=== Revolutionary War ===
- Brandywine
- Germantown
- New Jersey 1777
- Pennsylvania 1777
- Pennsylvania 1778
- Pennsylvania 1779

=== Mexican War ===
- Vera Cruz
- Cerro Gordo

=== Civil War ===
- Chancellorsville
- Gettysburg
- Wilderness
- Spotsylvania
- Cold Harbor
- Petersburg
- Virginia 1861
- Virginia 1863

=== World War I ===
- Oise-Aisne
- Ypres-Lys
- Meuse-Argonne
- Champagne 1918
- Lorraine 1918

=== World War II ===
- Normandy
- Northern France
- Rhineland
- Ardennes-Alsace
- Central Europe

=== War on Terrorism ===
Iraq 2004-2005 Iraq 2009

== Decorations ==
- Presidential Unit Citation (Army), Streamer embroidered ARDENNE
- Luxembourg Croix de Guerre, Streamer embroidered LUXEMBOURG

== Heraldry ==
=== Coat of arms ===
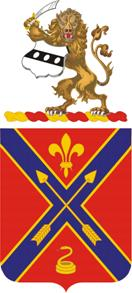

=== Distinctive unit insignia ===
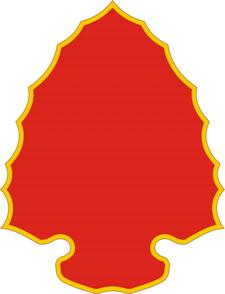
