= Boalsburg, Pennsylvania =

Unincorporated community in Pennsylvania, US

- Census-designated place
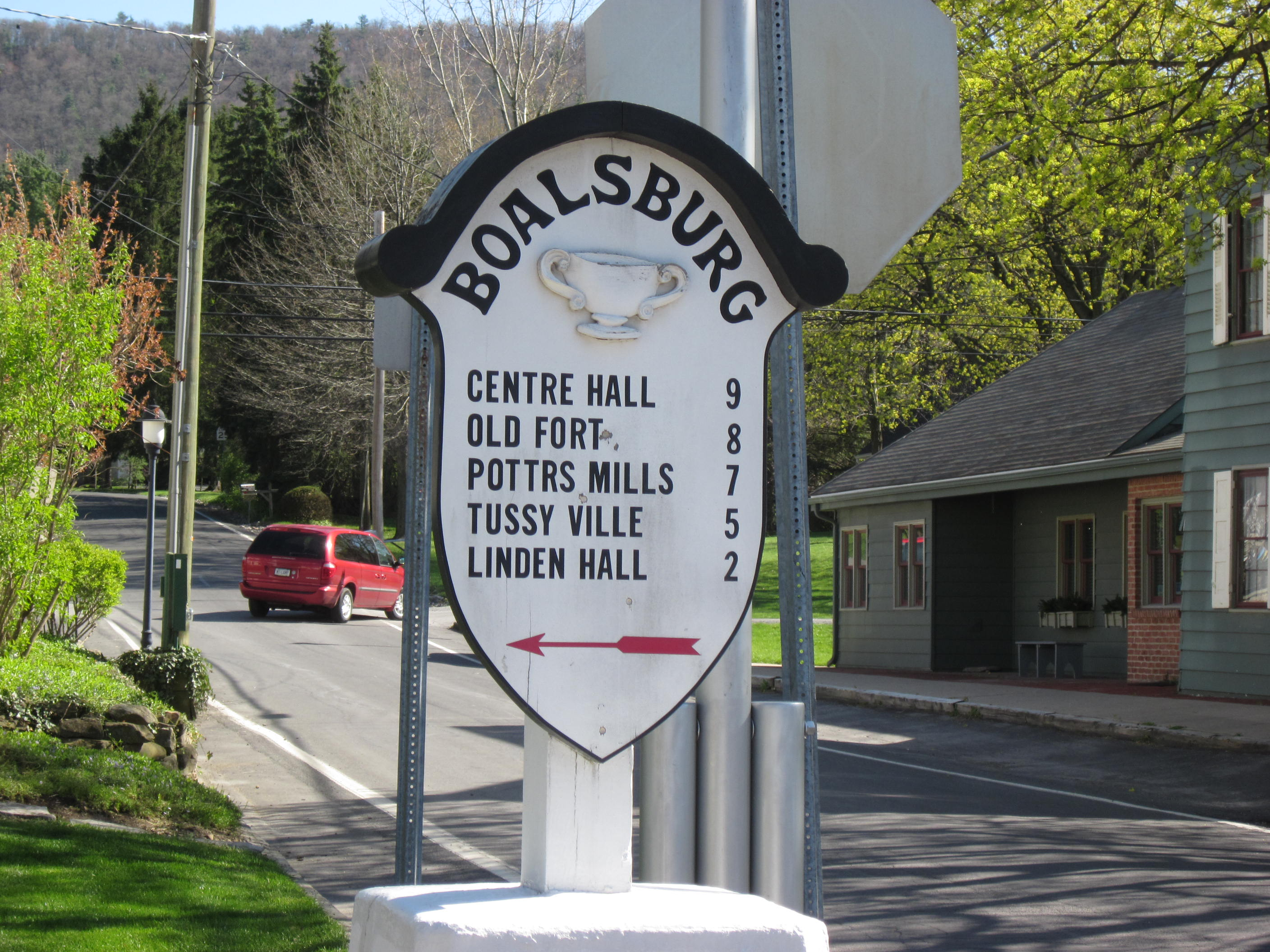
- Directional signage in downtown Boalsburg

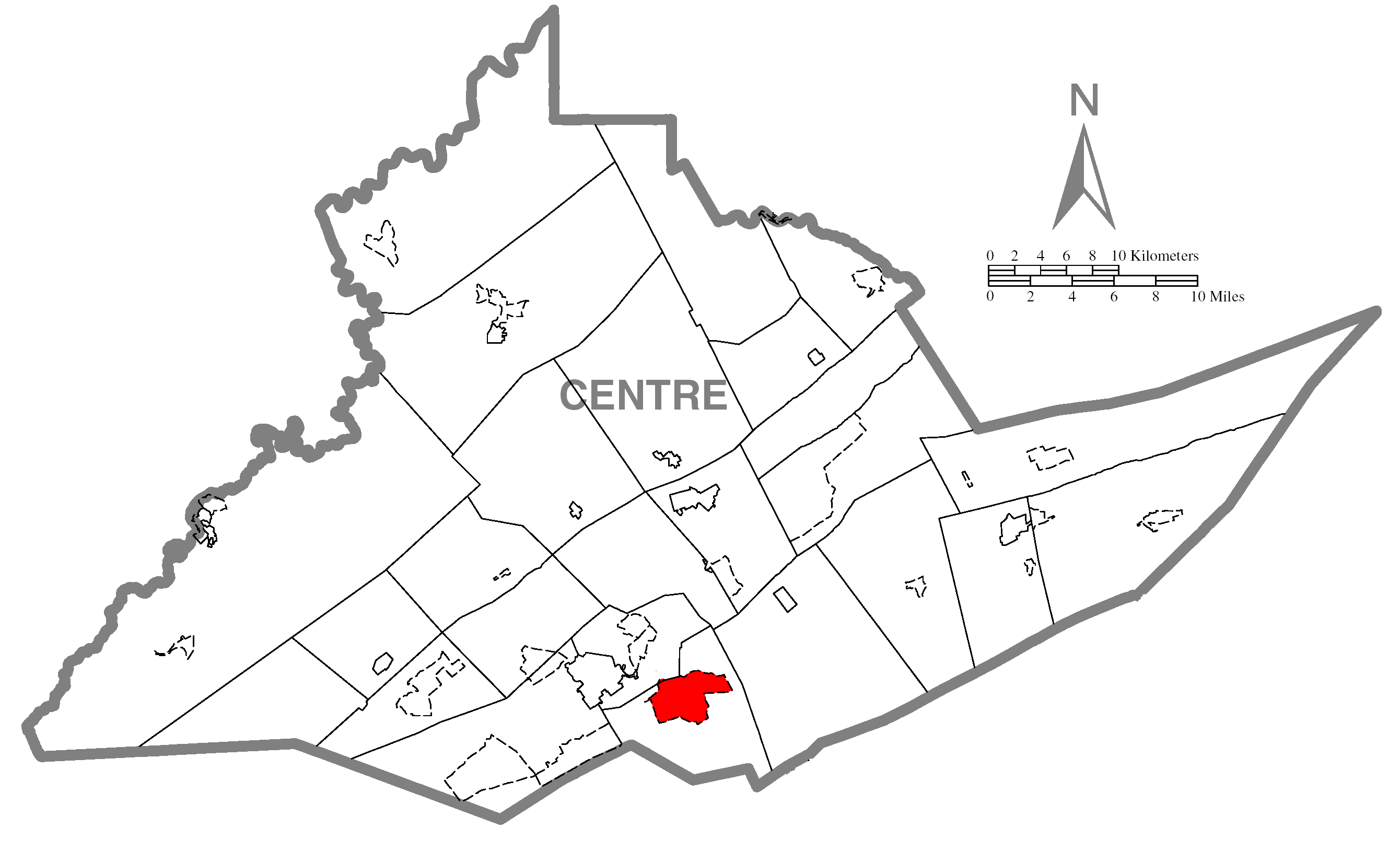
- Location within Centre County

- Location within the U.S. state of Pennsylvania Boalsburg (the United States)
- Coordinates: 40°46′58″N 77°47′13″W
- Country: United States
- State: Pennsylvania
- County: Centre
- Townships: Harris, College

Area
  - Total: 5.80 sq mi (15.03 km^{2})
  - Land: 5.80 sq mi (15.02 km^{2})
  - Water: 0.0039 sq mi (0.01 km^{2})
- Elevation: 1,105 ft (337 m)

Population (2020)
  - Total: 4,577
  - Density: 789.5/sq mi (304.82/km^{2})
- Time zone: UTC-5 (Eastern (EST))
  - Summer (DST): UTC-4 (EDT)
- ZIP code: 16827
- Area code: 814
- FIPS code: 42-07368

Boalsburg is an unincorporated community and census-designated place (CDP) in Harris Township, Centre County, Pennsylvania, United States, with a small portion of its northwest corner extending into College Township. It is part of the State College, Pennsylvania Metropolitan Statistical Area. The population was 3,722 at the 2010 census. The village claims to be the birthplace of Memorial Day. However, that claim was brought into question by Bellware and Gardiner in their book, The Genesis of the Memorial Day Holiday in America, in 2014. In their book, Bellware and Gardiner point out that the Boalsburg story was first published in 1904, forty years after the fact with no indication that General Logan drew inspiration from any activities in Boalsburg and no evidence that it started the holiday.

== History ==
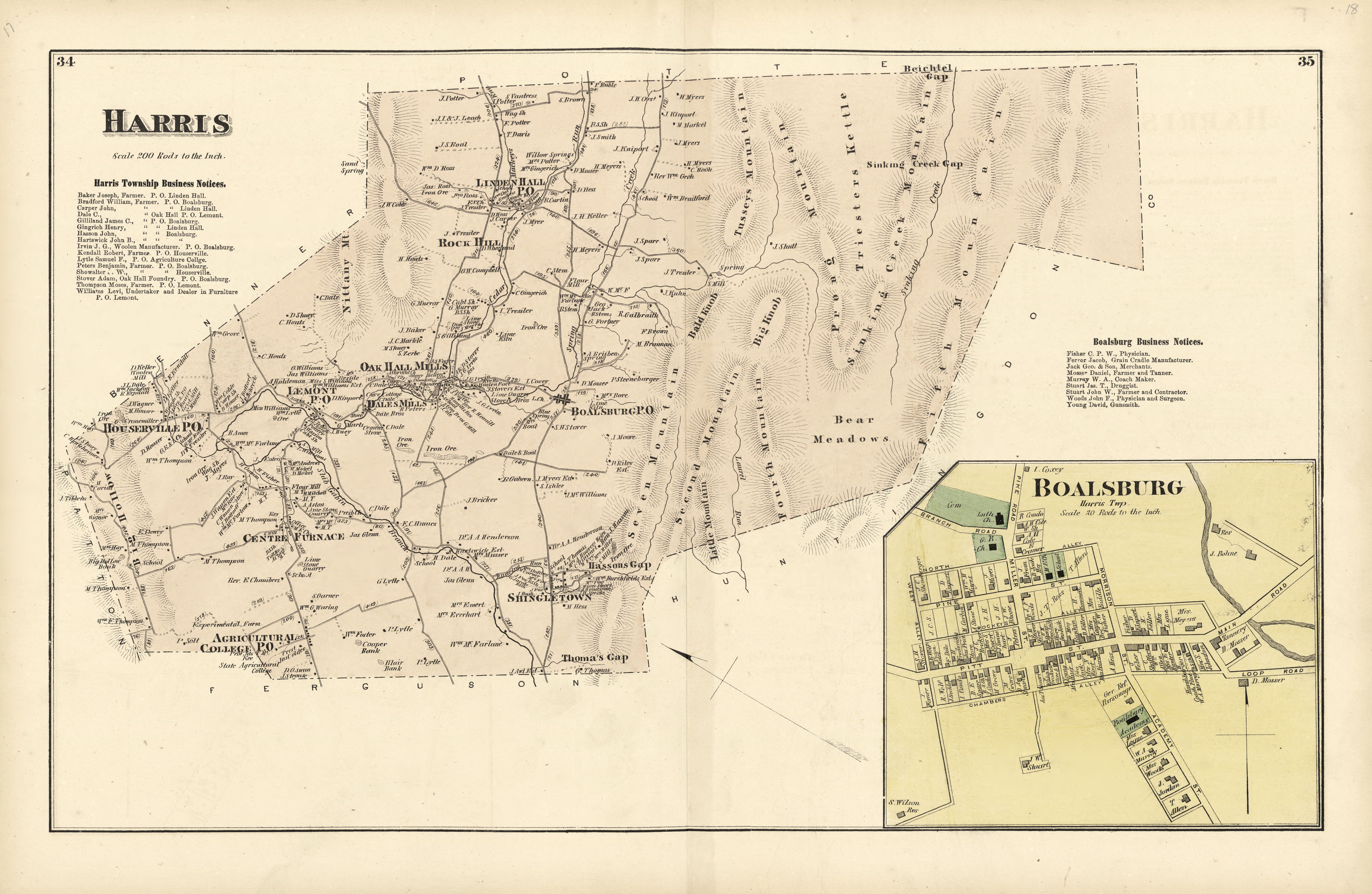
Atlas of Boalsburg, 1874

The name "Boalsburg" comes from the Boal family who settled the region after emigrating from County Londonderry, Ireland. The fourth generation of the Boal family, Col. Theodore Davis Boal, married Mathilde de Lagarde whose mother's sister Victoria married Diego Santiago Colón, a descendant of Christopher Columbus. Mathilde inherited a portion of her aunt Victoria's estate in 1908 and brought the Columbus Chapel to the Boal Mansion from Spain in 1919 This inheritance included an admiral's desk that family tradition says belonged to Columbus himself. The Columbus Chapel and Boal Mansion Museum are open to the public. Boalsburg originally was on the main road for travelers from Philadelphia to Pittsburgh, with the David Boal tavern that housed travelers still standing today. Boalsburg is home to the Pennsylvania Military Museum, as well as the headquarters of the Civil War reenacting unit, 3rd Pennsylvania Light Artillery Battery B.

The Boalsburg Historic District and Hill House were added to the National Register of Historic Places in 1977. The Boal Mansion was added the following year.

The town has a market square design known as 'the Diamond', a common design feature of towns in the northern province of Ulster in Ireland, the style of which was imported by emigrants from Ulster to Pennsylvania.

== Geography ==
Boalsburg is located in southern Centre County at 40°46′58″N 77°47′13″W (40.782670, -77.786899). It occupies the central and northern sections of Harris Township and extends northwest barely into College Township. It borders Rothrock State Forest.

According to the United States Census Bureau, the CDP has a total area of 5.8 square miles (15.0 km^{2}), all land. It is centered upon Pennsylvania Route 45 and Business U.S. Route 322. 322 begins as the Mount Nittany Expressway in the CDP and travels northwest from Boalsburg, bypassing State College to the east and north, while Business 322 begins as Boal Avenue and proceeds into the center of State College, 4 miles (6 km) northwest of Boalsburg, as Atherton Street. In the other direction US 322 leads east and then south 27 miles (43 km) to Lewistown.

Spring Creek flows northward through Boalsburg towards Bald Eagle Creek, a tributary of the West Branch Susquehanna River. The Tussey Mountain Ski Area is located on the eastern edge of Boalsburg.

== Demographics ==
Historical population
Census	Pop.	Note	%±
2020	4,577		—
U.S. Decennial Census

=== 2020 census ===
As of the 2020 census, Boalsburg had a population of 4,577.

The median age was 47.0 years. 19.3% of residents were under the age of 18 and 25.0% were 65 years of age or older. For every 100 females there were 95.2 males, and for every 100 females age 18 and over there were 92.7 males age 18 and over.

77.4% of residents lived in urban areas, while 22.6% lived in rural areas.

There were 1,974 households, of which 23.4% had children under the age of 18 living in them. Of all households, 57.6% were married-couple households, 13.3% were households with a male householder and no spouse or partner present, and 23.5% were households with a female householder and no spouse or partner present. About 25.0% of all households were made up of individuals and 12.0% had someone living alone who was 65 years of age or older.

There were 2,154 housing units, of which 8.4% were vacant. The homeowner vacancy rate was 0.3% and the rental vacancy rate was 5.3%.

Racial composition as of the 2020 census
Race	Number	Percent
White	3,955	86.4%
Black or African American	189	4.1%
American Indian and Alaska Native	12	0.3%
Asian	133	2.9%
Native Hawaiian and Other Pacific Islander	0	0.0%
Some other race	40	0.9%
Two or more races	248	5.4%
Hispanic or Latino (of any race)	123	2.7%

=== 2010 census ===
As of the census of 2010, there were 3,722 people, 1,523 households, and 1,076 families residing in the CDP. The population density was 602.5 inhabitants per square mile (232.6/km^{2}). There were 1,613 housing units at an average density of 260.2/sq mi (100.5/km^{2}). The racial makeup of the CDP was 93.5% White, 2.2% Black or African American, 0.1% Native American, 2.0% Asian, 0.4% from other races, and 1.7% from two or more races. Hispanic or Latino of any race were 1.6% of the population.

There were 1,523 households, out of which 31.7% had children under the age of 18 living with them, 57.8% were married couples living together, 3.5% had a male householder with no wife present, 9.4% had a female householder with no husband present, and 29.3% were non-families. 23.4% of all households were made up of individuals, and 8.0% had someone living alone who was 65 years of age or older. The average household size was 2.44 and the average family size was 2.89.

In the CDP, the population was spread out, with 23.3% under the age of 18, 7.4% from 18 to 24, 22.6% from 25 to 44, 32.4% from 45 to 64, and 14.3% who were 65 years of age or older. The median age was 43 years. For every 100 females, there were 91.9 males. For every 100 females age 18 and over, there were 89.1 males.

The median income for a household in the CDP was $62,289, and the median income for a family was $70,612. The per capita income for the CDP was $32,676. About 4.7% of families and 6.0% of the population were below the poverty line, including 11.6% of those under age 18 and 2.6% of those age 65 or over.

== Transportation ==
The Centre Area Transportation Authority provides on-demand routes for Boalsburg which connects to fixed routes in other parts of Happy Valley.

=== Roads ===
Highways include:

- U.S. Route 322 Business
- U.S. Route 322
- Pennsylvania Route 45
